= Drag Race México: Latina Royale =

2026 spin-off of the television series Drag Race México

- Genre: Reality competition
- Judges: Lolita Banana; Taiga Brava
- Country of origin: Mexico
- Original language: Spanish
- No. of seasons: 1
- No. of episodes: 10

Production
- Executive producers: Randy Barbato; Fenton Bailey; Tom Campbell; RuPaul Charles
- Camera setup: Multi-camera
- Running time: 55–90 minutes
- Production company: World of Wonder

Original release
- Network: WOW Presents Plus
- Release: 30 July 2026 – present

Related
- Drag Race Mexico; RuPaul's Drag Race: UK vs. the World; Canada's Drag Race: Canada vs. the World; RuPaul's Drag Race Global All Stars; Drag Race Down Under vs. the World; Drag Race Philippines: Slaysian Royale

Drag Race México: Latina Royale is a spin-off of the television series Drag Race México, that premiered on July 30, 2026. The show features Latino and Hispanic contestants from the Drag Race franchise.

The cast was confirmed in June 2026.

== Contestants ==
Ages, names, and cities stated are at time of filming.

Contestants of Drag Race México: Latina Royale season 1 and their backgrounds
Contestant	Age	Hometown	Original season(s)	Original placement(s)	Outcome
Elektra Vandergeld	28	Mexico City, Mexico	México season 2	5th place	Winner
Matraka	27	León, Mexico	México season 1	Runner-up (Note: Matraka was voted Fan Favourite on her original season.)	Runner-up
Eva Blunt	37	Mexico City, Mexico	México season 2	Runner-up	3rd place
Regina Voce	44	Mexico City, Mexico	México season 1	Runner-up	3rd place
Alexis Mateo	46	Las Vegas, United States	US season 3	3rd place	5th place
Alexis Mateo	46	Las Vegas, United States	All Stars 1	5th place	5th place
Alexis Mateo	46	Las Vegas, United States	All Stars 5	5th place	5th place
Alexis Mateo	46	Las Vegas, United States	Canada vs. the World season 2	Runner-up	5th place
Mariana Stars	30	Mérida, Venezuela	España season 4	5th place	6th place
Horacio Potasio (Note: Gonzalez is referred to as Horacio Potasio on the season and her original season.)	22	Mexico City, Mexico	México season 2	Runner-up	7th place
Xunami Muse	36	Colón, Panama	US season 16	9th place (Note: Xunami Muse was voted Miss Congeniality on her original season.)	8th place
Miss Abby OMG	31	Breda, Netherlands	Holland season 1	3rd place	9th place
DesiRée Beck	35	Irecê, Brazil	Brasil season 2	7th place	10th place (Note: DesiRée Beck was voted Miss Congeniality by fellow contestants.)
Barbie Q	28	Munich, Germany	Germany season 1	11th place	11th place

== Contestant progress ==
Legend:

Elektra Vandergeld won Drag Race México: Latina Royale season 1.
Matraka was the runner-up.
DesiRée Beck was voted Miss Congeniality (Miss C) by fellow contestants.
WIN indicates that the contestant won the challenge.
TOP2 indicates that the contestant won the challenge, but lost the Lip Sync for the Win.
SAFE indicates that the contestant was declared safe by the judges.
LOT (Lotería) indicates that the contestant was eliminated but saved by the judges using the Lotería Twist.
BTM (Bottom) indicates that the contestant was up for elimination.
ELIM (Eliminated) indicates that the contestant was eliminated.
Guest indicates that the contestant returned as a guest.

Contestants progress with placements in each episode
Contestant	Episode									
Contestant	1	2	3	4	5	6	7	8	9	10
Elektra Vandergeld	WIN	SAFE	SAFE	TOP2	TOP2	SAFE	SAFE	SAFE	BTM	Winner
Matraka	SAFE	SAFE	WIN	SAFE	WIN	SAFE	BTM	TOP2	SAFE	Runner-up
Eva Blunt	TOP2	SAFE	SAFE	BTM	SAFE	BTM	TOP2	BTM	WIN	Eliminated
Regina Voce	SAFE	WIN	SAFE	SAFE	SAFE	SAFE	SAFE	WIN	TOP2	Eliminated
Alexis Mateo	SAFE	SAFE	TOP2	SAFE	BTM	SAFE	SAFE	SAFE	ELIM	Guest
Mariana Stars	BTM	BTM	BTM	LOT	BTM	TOP2	WIN	ELIM	Guest	Guest
Horacio Potasio	SAFE	SAFE	SAFE	SAFE	BTM	WIN	ELIM		Guest	Guest
Xunami Muse	SAFE	SAFE	SAFE	WIN	SAFE	ELIM			Guest	Guest
Miss Abby OMG	SAFE	TOP2	SAFE	SAFE	ELIM				Guest	Guest
DesiRée Beck	BTM	SAFE	ELIM						Guest	Miss C
Barbie Q	SAFE	ELIM								Guest

== Lip syncs ==
Legend:

The contestant was eliminated after their first time in the bottom.
The contestant was eliminated after their second time in the bottom.
The contestant was eliminated after their sixth time in the bottom.
The contestant won the Lip Sync for the Crown and was declared the winner of the season.

Episode	Top Contestants (Elimination)			Song	Winner	Bottom	Eliminated
1	Elektra Vandergeld (DesiRée)	vs.	Eva Blunt (DesiRée)	"Te Aviso, Te Anuncio (Tango)" (Shakira)	Elektra Vandergeld	DesiRée, Mariana	None (Note: In Episode 1, hosts Lolita Banana and Taiga Brava announced that neither of the bottom two queens would be eliminated from the competition.)
2	Miss Abby OMG (Mariana)	vs.	Regina Voce (Barbie)	"Flash y Pose" (Emjay)	Regina Voce	Barbie, Mariana	Barbie Q
3	Alexis Mateo (DesiRée)	vs.	Matraka (DesiRée)	"Pobre Secretaria" (Daniela Romo)	Matraka	DesiRée, Mariana	DesiRée Beck
4	Elektra Vandergeld (Mariana)	vs.	Xunami Muse (Mariana)	"Cha Cha Bitch" (RuPaul ft. AB Soto)	Xunami Muse	Eva, Mariana	None (Note: Xunami Muse chose to eliminate Mariana Stars, however, the judges unanimously decided to use the power of the "Lotería" to save her from elimination.)
5	Elektra Vandergeld (Mariana)	vs.	Matraka (Miss Abby)	"Soy Yo" (Bomba Estéreo)	Matraka	Alexis, Horacio, Mariana, Miss Abby	Miss Abby OMG
6	Horacio Potasio (Xunami)	vs.	Mariana Stars (Xunami)	"Échalo Pa' Ca" (Sofía Reyes, Darell, Lalo Ebratt)	Horacio Potasio	Eva, Xunami	Xunami Muse
7	Eva Blunt (Matraka)	vs.	Mariana Stars (Horacio)	"De Maravisha" (Tokischa, Nathy Peluso)	Mariana Stars	Horacio, Matraka	Horacio Potasio
8	Matraka (Mariana)	vs.	Regina Voce (Mariana)	"20 De Enero" (La Oreja de Van Gogh)	Regina Voce	Eva, Mariana	Mariana Stars
9	Eva Blunt (Alexis)	vs.	Regina Voce (Alexis)	"Automático" (María Becerra)	Eva Blunt	Alexis, Elektra	Alexis Mateo
Episode	Final contestants			Song	Winner		
10	Elektra Vandergeld	vs.	Matraka	"Disciplina" (Lali)	Elektra Vandergeld		

== Guest judges ==
On July 22, the celebrity guest judges for this season were revealed.

- Envy Peru, winner of Drag Race Holland season 1 (episode 1)
- Grag Queen, winner of Queen of the Universe season 1 and host of Drag Race Brasil (episodes 2 and 3)
- Cristian Peralta, winner of Drag Race México season 1 (episodes 4 and 5)
- Renata Dragón Real, drag queen and influencer (episodes 6 and 7)
- Supremme de Luxe, host of Drag Race España and España All Stars (episode 8)
- Leexa Fox, winner of Drag Race México season 2 (episodes 9 and 10)

=== Special guests ===
Guests who appeared in episodes, but did not judge on the main stage.

Episode 3

- Moophs, Filipino musician, producer, songwriter and DJ

Episode 5

- Norvina, president of Anastasia Beverly Hills

Episode 10

- Nunoy, choreographer
- Paolo Ballesteros, host of Drag Race Philippines and Drag Race Philippines: Slaysian Royale
- Brigiding, winner of Drag Race Philippines: Slaysian Royale season 1 and contestant on Drag Race Philippines season 1

== Episodes ==
No.	Title	Original release date
1	"United By a Language, Separated By a Crown"	30 July 2026
Eleven queens from across the Drag Race franchise enter the competition. For the first mini challenge, the queens go head-to-head to try and snatch a wig off your opponent's head. Matraka wins the mini challenge. For the main challenge, the queens present three looks for The Carnival Ball: Instrumento de Carnaval (Carnival Instrument), Máscara de Carnaval (Carnival Mask) and Reina de Carnaval (Carnival Queen). On the runway, Elektra Vandergeld, Eva Blunt and Xunami Muse receive positive critiques, with Elektra Vandergeld and Eva Blunt being announced as the top two. Barbie Q, DesiRée Beck and Mariana Stars receive negative critiques, with DesiRée Beck and Mariana Stars being announced as the bottom two. Elektra Vandergeld and Eva Blunt lip-sync to "Te Aviso, Te Anuncio (Tango)" by Shakira. Elektra Vandergeld wins the lip-sync. After the lip-sync, Lolita Banana and Taiga Brava announce that no one will be going home.: Guest Judge: Envy Peru; Mini-Challenge: Go head-to-head to try and snatch a wig off your opponent's head; Mini-Challenge Winner: Matraka; Mini-Challenge Prize: A MX$ 18,000 cash tip; Main Challenge: The Carnival Ball; Runway Themes: Instrumento de Carnaval (Carnival Instrument), Máscara de Carnaval (Carnival Mask) and Reina de Carnaval (Carnival Queen); Challenge Winners: Elektra Vandergeld and Eva Blunt; Lip-Sync Song: "Te Aviso, Te Anuncio (Tango)" by Shakira; Lip-Sync for The World Winner: Elektra Vandergeld; Bottom Two: DesiRée Beck and Mariana Stars; Eliminated: None
2	"Latin America Has Talent"	6 August 2026
At the beginning of the episode, Elektra Vandergeld and Eva Blunt both reveal that they would have sent home DesiRée Beck from the competition, had there been an elimination. For this week mini-challenge, the queens make a profile video for the dating app Grindr. DesiRée Beck and Mariana Stars win the mini-challenge. For the main challenge, the queens will perform a talent show in front of the judges.: Alexis Mateo – Original song lip-sync; Barbie Q – Spoken word / Comedic lip-syncing; DesiRée Beck – Comedy routine; Elektra Vandergeld – Original song lip-sync; Eva Blunt – Dance routine; Horacio Potasio – Original song lip-sync / Dance routine; Mariana Stars – Original song lip-sync; Matraka – Dance routine; Miss Abby OMG – Original song lip-sync / DJ set; Regina Voce – Live singing; Xunami Muse – Original song lip-sync; On the runway, category is Mi Tierra (My Homeland). Before the critiques, Lolita Banana and Taiga Brava reveal the twist of the season: each week, the judges have the power to invoke the Lotería ("Lottery"), but only if they unanimously agree to use it; if activated, it can overturn the result of an elimination, giving the eliminated queen another chance to remain in the competition. Elektra Vandergeld, Miss Abby OMG and Regina Voce receive positive critiques, with Miss Abby OMG and Regina Voce being announced as the top two. Barbie Q, Eva Blunt and Mariana Stars receive negative critiques, with Barbie Q and Mariana Stars being announced as the bottom two. Miss Abby OMG and Regina Voce lip-sync to "Flash y Pose" by Emjay. Regina Voce wins the lip-sync and decides to eliminate Barbie Q from the competition.: Guest Judge: Grag Queen; Mini-Challenge: Make a profile video for the dating app Grindr; Mini-Challenge Winner: DesiRée Beck and Mariana Stars; Mini-Challenge Prize: A MX$ 9,000 cash tip each; Main Challenge: Perform a talent show in front of the judges; Runway Themes: Mi Tierra (My Homeland); Challenge Winners: Miss Abby OMG and Regina Voce; Lip-Sync Song: "Flash y Pose" by Emjay; Lip-Sync for The World Winner: Regina Voce; Bottom Two: Barbie Q and Mariana Stars; Eliminated: Barbie Q; Farewell Message: "La REINA de las Porkchops :)" ("The QUEEN of the Porkchops :)")
3	"Guerra de Grupas"	13 August 2026
At the beginning of the episode, Miss Abby OMG reveals that she would have sent home Mariana Stars from the competition, had she won the lip-sync. For this week's main challenge, the queens write, record, and perform verses to "Digna Rival" ("Worthy Rival").: Team Salvajes (Savage) - Alexis Mateo, DesiRée Beck, Eva Blunt, Mariana Stars and Xunami Muse; Team Latinas Rojo Sangre (Red Blood Latinas) - Elektra Vandergeld, Horacio Potasio, Matraka, Miss Abby OMG and Regina Voce; On the runway, category is Tributo a Mi Madre (Tribute to My Mother). Alexis Mateo, Horacio Potasio and Matraka receive positive critiques, with Alexis Mateo and Matraka being announced as the top two. DesiRèe Beck, Mariana Stars and Regina Voce receive negative critiques, with DesiRèe Beck and Mariana Stars being announced as the bottom two. Alexis Mateo and Matraka lip-sync to "Pobre Secretaria" by Daniela Romo. Matraka wins the lip-sync and decides to eliminate DesiRée Beck from the competition.: Guest Judge: Grag Queen; Main Challenge: Write, record, and perform verses to "Digna Rival" ("Worthy Rival"); Runway Themes: Tributo a Mi Madre (Tribute to My Mother); Challenge Winners: Alexis Mateo and Matraka; Lip-Sync Song: "Pobre Secretaria" by Daniela Romo; Lip-Sync for The World Winner: Matraka; Bottom Two: DesiRée Beck and Mariana Stars; Eliminated: DesiRée Beck; Farewell Message: "Yo hablo AMOR Quiero todos ustedes mucho bien. DB" ("I speak LOVE I wish you all the very best. DB")
4	"From the Table to the Catwalk"	20 August 2026
At the beginning of the episode, Alexis Mateo reveals that she would have sent home DesiRée Beck from the competition, had she won the lip-sync. For this week's mini-challenge, the queens read each other to filth. Eva Blunt wins the mini-challenge. For main challenge, the queens will create an outfit made from kitchen utensils and cooking material. On the runway, category is Modelos de FonDrag (FonDrag Model). Alexis Mateo, Elektra Vandergeld and Xunami Muse receive positive critiques, with Elektra Vandergeld and Xunami Muse being announced as the top two. Eva Blunt, Mariana Stars and Miss Abby OMG receive negative critiques, with Eva Blunt and Mariana Stars being announced as the bottom two. Elektra Vandergeld and Xunami Muse lip-sync to "Cha Cha Bitch" by RuPaul featuring AB Soto. Xunami Muse wins the lip-sync and decides to eliminate Mariana Stars from the competition; however, the judges unanimously decided to use the power of the "Lotería", and save Mariana from elimination.: Guest Judge: Cristian Peralta; Mini-Challenge: Reading is Fundamental; Mini-Challenge Winner: Eva Blunt; Mini-Challenge Prize: A MX$ 18,000 cash tip; Main Challenge: Create an outfit made out of kitchen utensils and cooking material; Runway Themes: Modelos de FonDrag (FonDrag Model); Challenge Winners: Elektra Vandergeld and Xunami Muse; Lip-Sync Song: "Cha Cha Bitch" by RuPaul featuring AB Soto; Lip-Sync for The World Winner: Xunami Muse; Bottom Two: Eva Blunt and Mariana Stars; Eliminated: None
5	"Laughing with the Dead"	27 August 2026
At the beginning of the episode, Elektra Vandergeld reveals that she would have sent home Mariana Stars from the competition, had she won the lip-sync. For this week's mini-challenge, the queens create a mannequin doll in pairs for "Mi Pequeña Latina" ("My Little Latina") pageant. Alexis Mateo, Horacio Potasio and Xunami Muse win the mini-challenge. For the main challenge, the queens play the Snatch Game de los Muertos. Taiga Brava and Cristian Peralta star as the celebrity contestants. The cast consisted of: Alexis Mateo – Burrita Burrona; Elektra Vandergeld – María Félix; Eva Blunt – Juan Gabriel; Horacio Potasio – Juana Inés de la Cruz; Mariana Stars – Hugo Chávez; Matraka – La Gilbertona; Miss Abby OMG – Cuca; Regina Voce – José José; Xunami Muse – Celia Cruz; On the runway, category is Bailando (Dancing). Elektra Vandergeld and Matraka receive positive critiques, and are announced as the top two. Alexis Mateo, Horacio Potasio, Mariana Stars and Miss Abby OMG receive negative critiques, and are announced as the bottom four. Alexis Mateo and Matraka lip-sync to "Soy Yo" by Bomba Estéreo. Matraka wins the lip-sync and decides to eliminate Miss Abby OMG from the competition.: Guest Judge: Cristian Peralta; Mini-Challenge: Create a mannequin doll in groups for "Mi Pequeña Latina" ("My Little Latina") pageant; Mini-Challenge Winner: Alexis Mateo, Horacio Potasio and Xunami Muse; Mini-Challenge Prize: A MX$ 26,000 cash tip, split between the winners; Main Challenge: Snatch Game de los Muertos; Runway Themes: Bailando (Dancing); Challenge Winners: Elektra Vandergeld and Matraka; Lip-Sync Song: "Soy Yo" by Bomba Estéreo; Lip-Sync for The World Winner: Matraka; Bottom Four: Alexis Mateo, Horacio Potasio, Mariana Stars and Miss Abby OMG; Eliminated: Miss Abby OMG; Farewell Message:
6	"Tiradera de Chavas"	3 September 2026
7	"Is the Recording Finished?"	10 September 2026
8	"And May the Best Drag Queen Make You Laugh"	17 September 2026
9	"All Will Be Mothers"	24 September 2026
10	"The Best Latina Royale"	1 October 2026

== See also ==
- List of Drag Race México episodes
