= La Más Draga season 3 =

La Más Draga
- Season 3
- Promotional poster for season three
- Hosted by: Karla Díaz
- Judges: Johnny Carmona; Bernardo "Letal" Vázquez; Yari Mejía
- No. of contestants: 13
- Winner: Aviesc Who?
- Runners-up: Madison; Raga Diamante; Rudy Reyes
- No. of episodes: 11

Release
- Original network: YouTube
- Original release: 22 September – 1 December 2020

Season chronology
- ← Previous; Season 2 Next → Season 4

The third season of La Más Draga premiered on 22 September and concluded on 1 December 2020. The competition was broadcast on YouTube, and was produced by La Gran Diabla Producciones. The series featured thirteen contestants, from all over Mexico, competing for the title of La Más Draga of Mexico and Latin America and a cash prize of $150,000 MXN Pesos. The winner of the third season of La Más Draga was Aviesc Who?, with Madison, Raga Diamante and Rudy Reyes as runners-up.

The judges panel of this season include Mexican singer and actress Karla Díaz, who was also the main host, TV and Internet personality Johnny Carmona, hair and makeup artist Yari Mejía, and drag performer Bernardo "Letal" Vázquez.

The season consisted of eleven one-hour episodes.

Unlike previous seasons, the castings were followed by Live Auditions held in Monterrey, Guadalajara, Mexico City and Ciudad Juárez, from which the first eight contestants were selected. The final five contestants, also known as "Secret Contestants", were invited to participate directly by the show's production.

== Contestants ==
Ages, names, and cities stated are at time of filming.

Contestants of La Más Draga season 3 and their backgrounds
Contestant	Age	Hometown	Outcome
Aviesc Who?	33	Guadalajara, Jalisco	Winner (Note: Aviesc Who? originally placed ninth before returning to the competition.)
Madison (Note: Madison Basrey is referred to as Madison on the show.)	29	Guadalajara, Jalisco	Runners-up
Raga Diamante (Note: Miss Raga Diamante is referred to as Raga Diamante on the show.)	32	Mérida, Yucatán	Runners-up
Rudy Reyes	27	Monterrey, Nuevo León	Runners-up
Memo Reyri	33	Mexico City	5th place
Mista Boo	44	Monterrey, Nuevo León	5th place
Regina Bronx	30	Aguascalientes, Aguascalientes	7th place
Iviza Lioza	27	Mexico City	8th place
Luna Lansman	32	Mexico City	9th place (Note: Luna Lansman was voted La Más Volada.)
Wynter (Note: The Wynter is referred to as Wynter on the show.)	25	Monterrey, Nuevo León	10th place (Note: Wynter was voted La Más Querida.)
Huntyy B	27	Ciudad Juárez, Chihuahua	11th place
StupiDrag (Note: StupiDrag Kween is referred to as StupiDrag on the show.)	29	Gómez Palacio, Durango	12th place
Yayoi Bowery	32	Mexico City	13th place

== Contestant progress ==
Legend:

Aviesc Who? won Las Más Draga season 3.
Madison, Raga Diamante and Rudy Reyes were the runners-up.
Wynter was voted was voted La Más Querida (LMQ).
Luna Lansman was voted La Más Volada (LMV).
WIN indicates the contestant received the highest score and won the challenge.
SAFE indicates that the contestant was declared safe by the judges.
BTM (Bottom) indicates that the contestant received one of the lowest scores and was up for elimination.
ELIM (Eliminated) indicates that the contestant received one of the lowest scores and was eliminated.
Guest indicates that the contestant returned as a guest.

Progress of contestants including rank/position in each episode
Contestant	Episode										
Contestant	1	2	3	4	5	6	7	8	9	10	11
Aviesc Who?	SAFE	BTM	WIN	SAFE	ELIM			SAFE	BTM	Guest	Winner
Madison	SAFE	SAFE	SAFE	SAFE	SAFE	WIN	SAFE	WIN	SAFE	Guest	Runner-up
Raga Diamante	SAFE	WIN	SAFE	WIN	SAFE	SAFE	WIN	SAFE	SAFE	Guest	Runner-up
Rudy Reyes	SAFE	SAFE	SAFE	SAFE	SAFE	BTM	SAFE	SAFE	WIN	Guest	Runner-up
Memo Reyri	SAFE	SAFE	SAFE	SAFE	WIN	SAFE	SAFE	BTM	ELIM	Guest	Guest
Mista Boo	WIN	SAFE	SAFE	SAFE	SAFE	SAFE	SAFE	SAFE	ELIM	Guest	Guest
Regina Bronx	SAFE	SAFE	SAFE	BTM	WIN	SAFE	BTM	ELIM		Guest	Guest
Iviza Lioza	SAFE	SAFE	SAFE	SAFE	SAFE	SAFE	ELIM			Guest	Guest
Luna Lansman	SAFE	SAFE	SAFE	SAFE	SAFE	ELIM				Guest	LMV
Wynter	SAFE	SAFE	SAFE	SAFE	ELIM					Guest	LMQ
Huntyy B	SAFE	SAFE	BTM	ELIM						Guest	Guest
StupiDrag	BTM	SAFE	ELIM							Guest	Guest
Yayoi Bowery	BTM	ELIM								Guest	Guest

=== Scores history ===
Summary of weekly voting and results
Contestant	Episode									Total
Contestant	1	2	3	4	5	6	7	8	9	Total
Aviesc Who?	14	5	20	11	6			18	10	84
Madison	8	15	18	15	18	19	19	19	16	147
Raga Diamante	12	19	16	23	17	14	20	15	19	155
Rudy Reyes	12	10	9	15	10	7	19	13	20	115
Memo Reyri	17	11	15	12	19	16	13	6	8	117
Mista Boo	19	13	13	14	14	15	18	16	6	128
Regina Bronx	7	11	14	8	19	18	10	8		95
Iviza Lioza	6	13	10	10	13	9	8			69
Luna Lansman	11	8	18	19	15	8				79
Wynter	7	12	12	17	8					56
Huntyy B	11	10	8	9						38
StupiDrag	5	16	5							26
Yayoi Bowery	5	6								11

== Lip syncs ==
Legend:

The contestant was eliminated after their first time in the bottom.
The contestant was eliminated after their second time in the bottom.
The contestant was eliminated after their third time in the bottom.

Episode	Contestants			Song	Eliminated
1	StupiDrag	vs.	Yayoi Bowery	"Tsunami" (Yari Mejía)	None
2	Aviesc Who?	vs.	Yayoi Bowery	"Bandido" (Ana Bárbara)	Yayoi Bowery
3	Huntyy B	vs.	StupiDrag	"Juana" (Thalía)	StupiDrag
4	Huntyy B	vs.	Regina Bronx	"Vive" (Kabah)	Huntyy B
5	Aviesc Who?	vs.	Wynter	"Chacalón" (Maribel Guardia)	Aviesc Who?
5	Aviesc Who?	vs.	Wynter	"Chacalón" (Maribel Guardia)	Wynter
6	Luna Lansman	vs.	Rudy Reyes	"Mi delirio" (Anahí)	Luna Lansman
7	Iviza Lioza	vs.	Regina Bronx	"De mi enamórate" (Daniela Romo)	Iviza Lioza
8	Memo Reyri	vs.	Regina Bronx	"Antes muerta que sencilla" (Los Horóscopos de Durango)	Regina Bronx
9	Aviesc Who? vs. Memo Reyri vs. Mista Boo			"Que ricas son las papas" (Maribel Guardia)	Memo Reyri
9	Aviesc Who? vs. Memo Reyri vs. Mista Boo			"Que ricas son las papas" (Maribel Guardia)	Mista Boo

== Judges ==
=== Main judges ===
- Bernardo "Letal" Vázquez, drag queen and professional makeup artist
- Johnny Carmona, TV and Internet personality
- Yari Mejía, designer, stylist, singer and model

=== Guest judges ===
Listed in chronological order.

- Regina Orozco, actress and singer
- Ana Bárbara, singer, actress, model and TV personality
- Alejandra Bogue, actress, comedian and TV host
- Apio Quijano, singer
- Maribel Guardia, actress, model and TV personality
- Bárbara de Regil, actress
- Aldo Rendón, stylist
- Albertano, actor and comedian
- Carmen Salinas, actress, impressionist, comedian and politician
- Andrea & Miguel, winners of La Más Draga online contest

=== Special guests ===
Guests who will appear in episodes, but not judge on the main stage.

Episode 1

- Gabilú Mireles, Foreo's representative

Episode 3

- Jorge Boyoli, TV host and choreographer
- Thalía, singer and actress

Episode 4 Mario Bustamente, Impulse CDMX's representative

Episode 5

- Ricky Lips, drag performer and celebrity impersonator

Episode 6

- Anahí, actress and singer
- Quecho Muñoz, actor, singer, and writer

Episode 7

- Alex Córdova, photographer
- Maribel Rubio, psychologist and Internet personality

Episode 9

- Neiko, DJ, singer and vocal coach

Episode 11

- Alexis 3XL, winner of season 2
- Eva Blunt, runner-up on season 1
- Gvajardo, runner-up on season 2
- Margaret Y Ya, runner-up on season 1
- Neiko, DJ, singer and vocal coach
- Paco Del Mazo, YouTuber and Internet personality
- UnTalFredp, content creator and entrepreneur

== Episodes ==
No. overall	No. in season	Title	Original release date
17	1	"La Más Suertuda"	22 September 2020
Thirteen Mexican drag queens enter the workroom. For the first mini-challenge, the queens will be quizzed about Mexican culture and La Más Draga. Memo Reyri wins the mini-challenge. For the main challenge, the queens will present a look inspired by the traditional Mexican Lotería and perform in a talent show. The talent show performances and Mexican Lotería card inspirations were as follows: Aviesc Who? - Painting; La Araña (The Spider); Huntyy B - Burlesque; La Estrella (The Star); Iviza Lioza - Monologue; El Sol (The Sun); Luna Lansman - Lip-syncing/magic show; El Camarón (The Shrimp), El Pescado (The Fish) and La Sirena (The Mermaid); Madison - Lip-syncing; El Gallo (The Rooster); Memo Reyri - Lip-syncing/fire show; El Diablito (The Little Devil); Mista Boo - Lip-syncing; El Diablito (The Little Devil); Raga Diamante - Singing; La Maceta (The Flowerpot); Regina Bronx - Rhythmic gymnastics; La Sirena (The Mermaid); Rudy Reyes - Dancing; El Gallo (The Rooster); StupiDrag - Lip-syncing/fire show; El Diablito (The Little Devil); Wynter - Lip-syncing; El Sol (The Sun); Yayoi Bowery - Singing; El Mundo (The World); On the runway, category is La Más Suertuda (The Luckiest). Aviesc Who?, Memo Reyri and Mista Boo receive positive critiques, with Mista Boo winning the challenge. Iviza Lioza, StupiDrag and Yayoi Bowery receive negative critiques, with Iviza Lioza being safe. StupiDrag and Yayoi Bowery lip-sync to "Tsunami" by Yari Mejía. Both queens win the lip-sync and no one goes home.: Guest Judge: Regina Orozco; Mini-Challenge: Quiz about Mexican culture and La Más Draga; Mini-Challenge Winner: Memo Reyri; Main Challenge: Present a look inspired by the traditional Mexican Lotería and perform in a talent show; Runway Theme: La Más Suertuda (The Luckiest); Challenge Winners: Mista Boo; Bottom Two: StupiDrag and Yayoi Bowery; Lip-Sync Song: "Tsunami" by Yari Mejía; Eliminated: None
18	2	"La Más Prehispánica"	29 September 2020
For this week's main challenge, the queens will present a look inspired by an ancient Pre-Columbian civilization. The queens' inspirations were as follows: Aviesc Who? - Aztec, Cōātlīcue; Huntyy B - Aztec, Tlāloc; Iviza Lioza - Aztec/Toltec, Itztlacoliuhqui; Luna Lansman - Maya, Chac Mool; Madison - Aztec, Ocēlōpilli; Memo Reyri - Aztec, Mictlāntēcutli; Mista Boo - Aztec/Toltec/Maya, Nagual; Raga Diamante - Maya, Ixchel; Regina Bronx - Aztec, Chalchiuhtlicue; Rudy Reyes - Aztec, Tlāloc; StupiDrag - Aztec, Xolotl; Wynter - Maya, Aluxe; Yayoi Bowery - Aztec, Coyolxāuhqui; On the runway, category is La Más Prehispánica (The Most Pre-Columbian). Madison, Raga Diamante and StupiDrag receive positive critiques, with Raga Diamante winning the challenge. Aviesc Who?, Luna Lansman and Yayoi Bowery receive negative critiques, with Luna Lansman being safe. Aviesc Who? and Yayoi Bowery lip-sync to "Bandido" by Ana Bárbara. Aviesc Who? wins the lip-sync and Yayoi Bowery is the first queen to sashay away.: Guest Judge: Ana Bárbara; Main Challenge: Present a look inspired by an ancient Pre-Columbian civilization; Runway Theme: La Más Prehispánica (The Most Pre-Columbian); Challenge Winner: Raga Diamante; Bottom Two: Aviesc Who? and Yayoi Bowery; Lip-Sync Song: "Bandido" by Ana Bárbara; Eliminated: Yayoi Bowery
19	3	"La Más Fichera"	6 October 2020
For this week's mini-challenge, the queens will have a dance off in teams. Madison and Rudy Reyes win the mini-challenge, and earn 3 extra stars added to their final challenge score this week. For the main challenge, the queens will present a look inspired by the "ficheras", women who entertained men at nightclubs during the 70's. On the runway, category is La Más Fichera (The Most Fichera). Aviesc Who?, Luna Lansman and Madison receive positive critiques, with Aviesc Who? winning the challenge. Huntyy B, Rudy Reyes and StupiDrag receive negative critiques, with Rudy Reyes being safe. Huntyy B and StupiDrag lip-sync to "Juana" by Thalía. Huntyy B wins the lip-sync and StupiDrag sashays away.: Guest Judge: Alejandra Bogue; Mini-Challenge: Dance off in teams; Mini-Challenge Winners: Madison and Rudy Reyes; Mini-Challenge Prize: 3 extra stars added to their final challenge score; Main Challenge: Present a look inspired by the "ficheras", women who entertained men at nightclubs during the 70's; Runway Theme: La Más Fichera (The Most Fichera); Challenge Winner: Aviesc Who?; Bottom Two: Huntyy B and StupiDrag; Lip-Sync Song: "Juana" by Thalía; Eliminated: StupiDrag
20	4	"La Más Chespirito"	13 October 2020
For this week's mini-challenge, the queens will divide into teams and write and act in short commercials about HIV awareness and prevention. Iviza Lioza, Raga Diamante and Regina Bronx win the mini-challenge, and earn 3 extra stars added to their final challenge score this week. For the main challenge, the queens will present a look inspired by one of the characters created by Chespirito (Roberto Gómez Bolaños), a Mexican actor and screenwriter. The runway inspirations were as follows: Aviesc Who? - El Chavo; Huntyy B - El Doctor Chapatín and El Chapulín Colorado; Iviza Lioza - La Bruja del 71; Luna Lansman - La Childinrina; Madison - El Doctor Chapatín and El Chapulín Colorado; Memo Reyri - El Chavo; Mista Boo - La Chimoltrufia; Raga Diamante - La Childinrina and El Chómpiras; Regina Bronx - El Chapulín Colorado; Rudy Reyes - El Chapulín Colorado; Wynter - El Chapulín Colorado; On the runway, category is La Más Piñata (The Most Piñata). Luna Lansman, Raga Diamante and Wynter receive positive critiques, with Raga Diamante winning the challenge. Huntyy B, Iviza Lioza and Regina Bronx receive negative critiques, with Iviza Lioza being safe. Huntyy B and Regina Bronx lip-sync to "Vive" by Kabah. Regina Bronx wins the lip-sync and Huntyy B sashays away.: Guest Judge: Apio Quijano; Mini-Challenge: Divide into teams and write and act in short commercials about HIV awareness and prevention; Mini-Challenge Winners: Iviza Lioza, Raga Diamante and Regina Bronx; Mini-Challenge Prize: 3 extra stars added to their final challenge score; Main Challenge: Create a look inspired by one of the characters created by Chespirito (Roberto Gómez Bolaños), a Mexican actor and screenwriter; Runway Theme: La Más Chespirito (The Most Chespirito); Challenge Winner: Raga Diamante; Bottom Three: Huntyy B and Regina Bronx; Lip-Sync Song: "Vive" by Kabah; Eliminated: Huntyy B
21	5	"La Más Famosa"	20 October 2020
For this week's main challenge, the queens will impersonate Mexican celebrities on the runway and in "Obteniendo al Chacal" (Getting the Stud), a parody of The Dating Game. The celebrities the queens impersonated were as follows: Aviesc Who? as Mama Lucha; Iviza Lioza as Irma Serrano; Luna Lansman as Verónica Castro; Madison as María Félix; Memo Reyri as Tin-Tan and Cantinflas; Mista Boo as Irma Serrano; Raga Diamante as Gloria Trevi; Regina Bronx as La India María; Rudy Reyes as Niurka; Wynter as AMLO and La Tesorito; On the runway, category is La Más Famosa (The Most Famous). Madison, Memo Reyri and Regina Bronx receive positive critiques, with Memo Reyri and Regina Bronx both winning the challenge. Aviesc Who?, Rudy Reyes and Wynter receive negative critiques, with Rudy Reyes being safe. Aviesc Who? and Wynter lip-sync to "Chacalón" by Maribel Guardia. After the lip-sync, the judges decide that both queens should be eliminated, meaning both Aviesc Who? and Wynter sashay away.: Guest Judge: Maribel Guardia; Main Challenge: Impersonate Mexican celebrities on the runway and in "Obteniendo al Chacal" (Getting the Stud), a parody of The Dating Game; Runway Theme: La Más Famosa (The Most Famous); Challenge Winners: Memo Reyri and Regina Bronx; Bottom Two: Aviesc Who? and Wynter; Lip-Sync Song: "Chacalón" by Maribel Guardia; Eliminated: Aviesc Who? and Wynter
22	6	"La Más Legendaria"	27 October 2020
For this week's main challenge, the queens will present an outfit inspired by a local urban legend. The queens' urban legends were as follows: Iviza Lioza - Witch; Luna Lansman - El Chupacabras; Madison - El Chupacabras; Memo Reyri - El Chupacabras; Mista Boo - Witch; Raga Diamante - El Huay Chivo; Regina Bronx - La Pascualita; Rudy Reyes - Nahual; On the runway, category is La Más Legendaria (The Most Mythical). Madison, Memo Reyri and Regina Bronx receive positive critiques, with Madison winning the challenge. Iviza Lioza, Luna Lansman and Rudy Reyes receive negative critiques, with Iviza Lioza being safe. Luna Lansman and Rudy Reyes lip-sync to "Me Delirio" by Anahí. Rudy Reyes wins the lip-sync and Luna Lansman sashays away.: Guest Judge: Bárbara de Regil; Main Challenge: Present an outfit inspired by a local urban legend; Runway Theme: La Más Legendaria (The Most Mythical); Challenge Winner: Madison; Bottom Two: Luna Lansman and Rudy Reyes; Lip-Sync Song: "Me Delirio" by Anahí; Eliminated: Luna Lansman
23	7	"La Más Bella Señorita México"	3 November 2020
For this week's mini-challenge, the queens will partake in a beauty photoshoot holding a Foreo product. Madison wins the mini-challenge, and earns 3 extra stars added to her final challenge score this week. For this week's main challenge, the queens will present a gown with a reveal to a swimsuit, based on the Miss México Pageant. On the runway, category is La Más Bella Señorita México (The Most Beautiful Miss Mexico). Madison, Raga Diamante and Rudy Reyes receive positive critiques, with Raga Diamante winning the challenge. Iviza Lioza and Regina Bronx receive negative critiques, and are announced as the bottom two. They lip-sync to "De Mí Enamórate" by Daniela Romo. Regina Bronx wins the lip-sync and Iviza Lioza sashays away.: Guest Judge: Aldo Rendón; Mini-Challenge: A beauty photoshoot holding a Foreo product; Mini-Challenge Winners: Madison; Mini-Challenge Prize: An exclusive Foreo kit and 3 extra stars added to their final challenge score; Main Challenge: Present a gown with a reveal to a swimsuit, based on the Miss México Pageant; Runway Theme: La Más Bella Señorita México (The Most Beautiful Miss Mexico); Challenge Winner: Raga Diamante; Bottom Two: Iviza Lioza and Regina Bronx; Lip Sync Song: "De Mí Enamórate" by Daniela Romo; Eliminated: Iviza Lioza
24	8	"La Más Buchona"	10 November 2020
At the start of the episode, it is revealed that the remaining queens will vote an eliminated queen back to the competition. Aviesc Who? receives the most votes and therefore returns to the competition. For this week's main challenge, the queens will makeover internet celebrities into buchonas, the archetype of a rich, opulent and luxurious girlfriend of a narcotrafficker. On the runway, category is La Más Legendaria (The Most Buchona). Aviesc Who?, Madison and Mista Boo receive positive critiques, with Madison winning the challenge. Memo Reyri and Regina Bronx receive negative critiques, and are announced as the bottom two. They lip-sync to "Antes Muerta Que Sencilla" by Los Horóscopos de Durango. Memo Reyri wins the lip-sync and Regina Bronx sashays away.: Guest Judge: Albertano; Returned: Aviesc Who?; Main Challenge: Makeover internet celebrities into buchonas, the archetype of a rich, opulent and luxurious girlfriend of a narcotrafficker; Runway Theme: La Más Buchona (The Most Mythical); Challenge Winner: Madison; Bottom Two: Memo Reyri and Regina Bronx; Lip-Sync Song: "Antes Muerta Que Sencilla" by Los Horóscopos de Durango; Eliminated: Regina Bronx
25	9	"La Más Antojable"	17 November 2020
For this week's main challenge, the queens will write, direct and film an infomercial with a past contestant of La Más Draga based on a typical Mexican dish, as well as present an outfit based on that same dish. The queens' past queen and Mexican dish were as follows: Aviesc Who? and Deborah La Grande; Maíz; Madison and Gala Varo; Tacos; Memo Reyri and Eva Blunt; Chiles en Nogada; Mista Boo and Soro Nasty; Flautas; Raga Diamante and Génesis Faux; Salbut; Rudy Reyes and Nina De La Fuente; Chiles en Nogada; On the runway, category is La Más Antojable (The Most Craveable). Raga Diamante and Rudy Reyes receive positive critiques, with Rudy Reyes winning the challenge. Aviesc Who?, Memo Reyri and Mista Boo receive negative critiques, and are announced as the bottom three. They lip-sync to "Que Ricas Son Las Papas" by Maribel Guardia. Aviesc Who? wins the lip-sync and Memo Reyri and Mista Boo both sashay away.: Guest Judge: Carmen Salinas; Main Challenge: Write, direct and film an infomercial with a past contestant of La Más Draga based on a typical Mexican dish, and present an outfit based on that same dish; Runway Theme: La Más Antojable (The Most Craveable); Challenge Winner: Rudy Reyes; Bottom Three: Aviesc Who?, Memo Reyri and Mista Boo; Lip-Sync Song: "Que Ricas Son Las Papas" by Maribel Guardia; Eliminated: Memo Reyri and Mista Boo
26	10	"Día de Muertas"	24 November 2020
All the queens, after walking the runway on the category Día de Muertas (Day of the Dead), return to talk about what happened this season. Discussions include, Yayoi Bowery's struggles while preparing for the show and her relationship with her family, StupiDrag's financial struggles and constantly being asleep, Huntyy B's gifting several of her things, her love for shoes and losing her mother, Wynter's family, double elimination and peculiar voice, Luna Lansman's strong relationships with the other queens and her elimination, Iviza Lioza's love for stirring drama and explosive attitude, Regina Bronx's short time as a drag queen and rapid evolution, Memo Reyri's ability to adapt his drag for the challenges and his overall performance on the show, Mista Boo's experiences as a witch and being deemed as a bully with Madison and Rudy Reyes, Aviesc Who's? mixing her fashion expertise with the drag world and managing her own brand, Madison's being underestimated at the beginning and some of her things being stolen, Raga Diamante's professionalism and troubled youth, Rudy Reyes' dance background and coining several phrases, and the queens vote for their favorite and least favorite looks of the night.: Runway Theme: Día de Muertas (Day of the Dead)
27	11	"La Gran Final"	1 December 2020
For the final challenge of the season, the queens will produce, direct, and star in their own original performance on an original track recorded by themselves with DJ Neiko, and then present a look inspired by Mexican culture. The queens Mexican Culture inspirations were as follows: Aviesc Who? - Mexican Art; Madison - Lele Doll; Raga Diamante - Family Tree; Rudy Reyes - Gulf of Mexico; The queens walk the runway one last time. It is revealed that Wynter is this season's La Más Querida (Miss Congeniality). It is then revealed that Luna Lansman is this season's La Más Volada (a prize sponsored by Viva Aerobus). It is then revealed that Aviesc Who? is the winner, leaving Madison, Raga Diamante and Rudy Reyes as the runners-up.: Guest Judges: Andrea & Miguel; Main Challenge: Produce, direct, and star in their own original performance on an original track recorded by themselves with DJ Neiko; Runway Theme: Lo Que Más Amo de México (What I Most Love About Mexico); La Más Querida: Wynter; La Más Volada: Luna Lansman; Runners-up: Madison, Raga Diamante and Rudy Reyes; Winner of La Más Draga Season Three: Aviesc Who?
