= Pixie Pixie =

Mexican drag performer

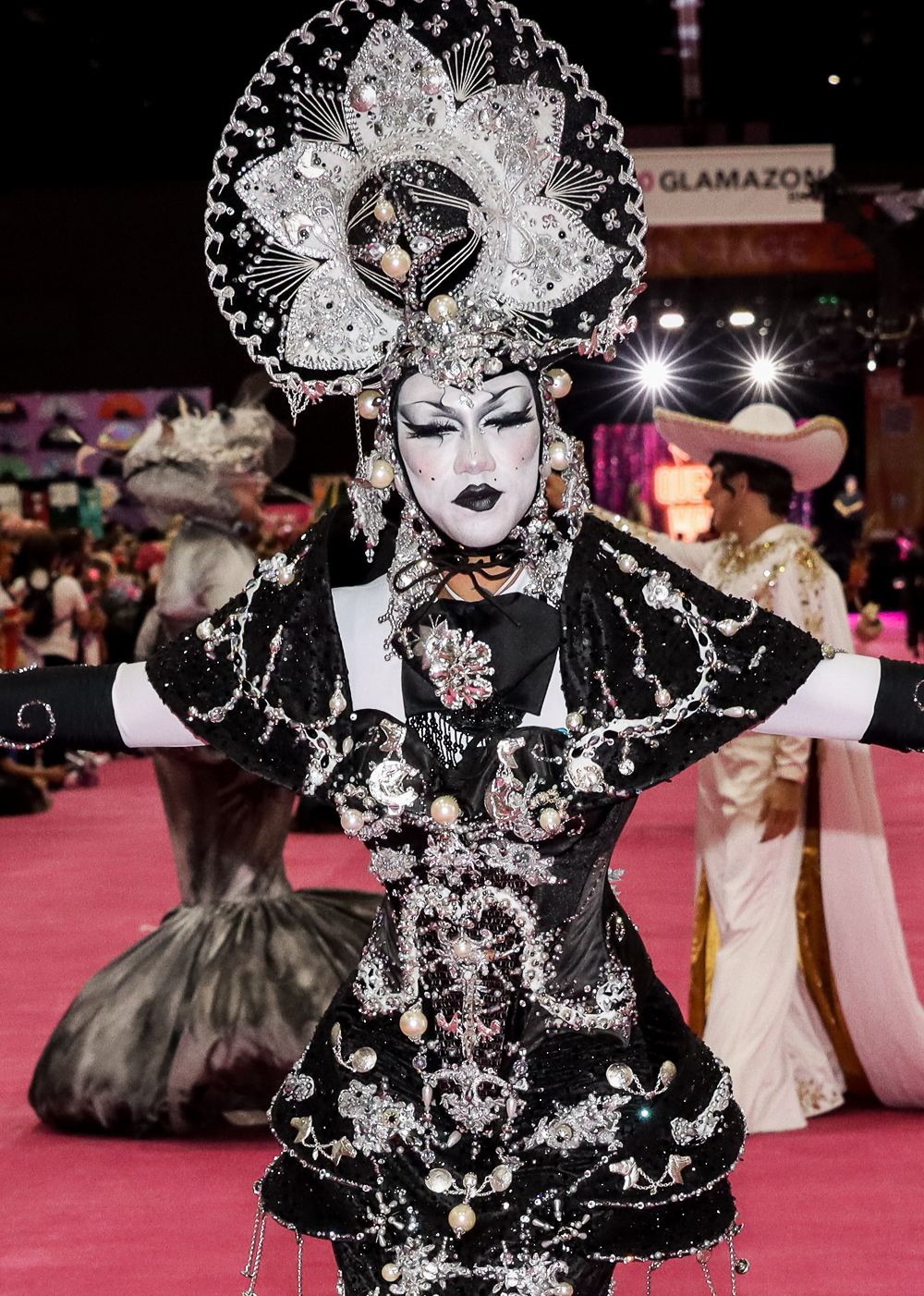
- Pixie Pixie at RuPaul's DragCon LA, 2024
- Born: Pedro Antonio González Marín; Mexico City, Mexico
- Other name: Antonio Pixie
- Occupations: Drag performer Pornographic actor

Pixie Pixie, also known as Antonio Pixie, is the stage name of Pedro Antonio González Marín, a Mexican drag performer and pornographic actor who competed on season 1 of Drag Race México.

== Career ==
Pixie Pixie has been a drag performer for a decade. She is inspired by conceptual fashion, the goth subculture, and Mexican surrealism. She competed on the first season of Drag Race México.

== Personal life ==
Pixie Pixie is originally from Mexico City. In 2017, she was one of five drag queens who participated in Museo Nacional de las Culturas' project commemorating International Day Against Homophobia, Biphobia and Transphobia. Pixie Pixie is the "drag mother" of fellow Drag Race México contestant Vermelha Noir.

== Filmography ==
=== Television ===
Year	Title	Role	Notes	Ref
2023	Drag Race México	Contestant (Season 1)	9th Place	
2025	Bring Back My Girls	Guest	Season 4 Episode 5	
