= Horacio Potasio =

Mexican drag performer

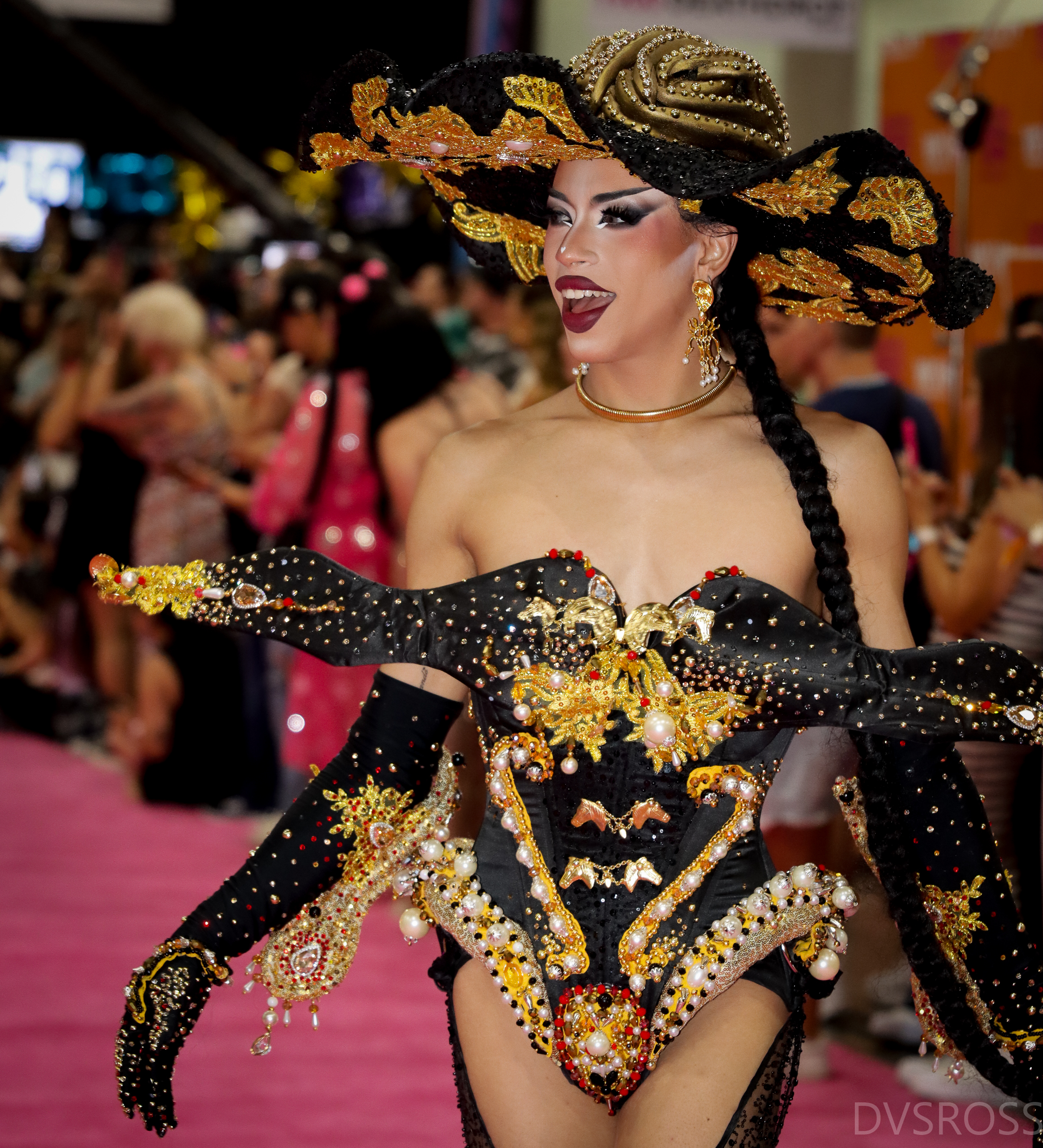
- Horacio Potasio in 2024
- Born: Jesús Horacio González Gómez; Mexico
- Occupation: Drag performer
- Known for: Competitor on Drag Race México (season 2)
- Relatives: Gala Varo (drag mother)

Horacio Potasio is the stage name of Jesús Horacio González Gómez, a Mexican drag performer who competed on the second season of Drag Race México and will compete on the upcoming Drag Race México: Latina Royale.

Horacio Potasio is from Guadalajara. She is the "drag daughter" of Gala Varo.

== Filmography ==
| Year | Title | Role | Ref. |
|---|---|---|---|
| 2024 | Drag Race México (season 2) | Herself (contestant) | Runner-Up |
| 2026 | Drag Race México: Latina Royale | Herself (contestant) | 8th Place |

== See also ==
- List of drag queens
