= List of Drag Race México episodes =

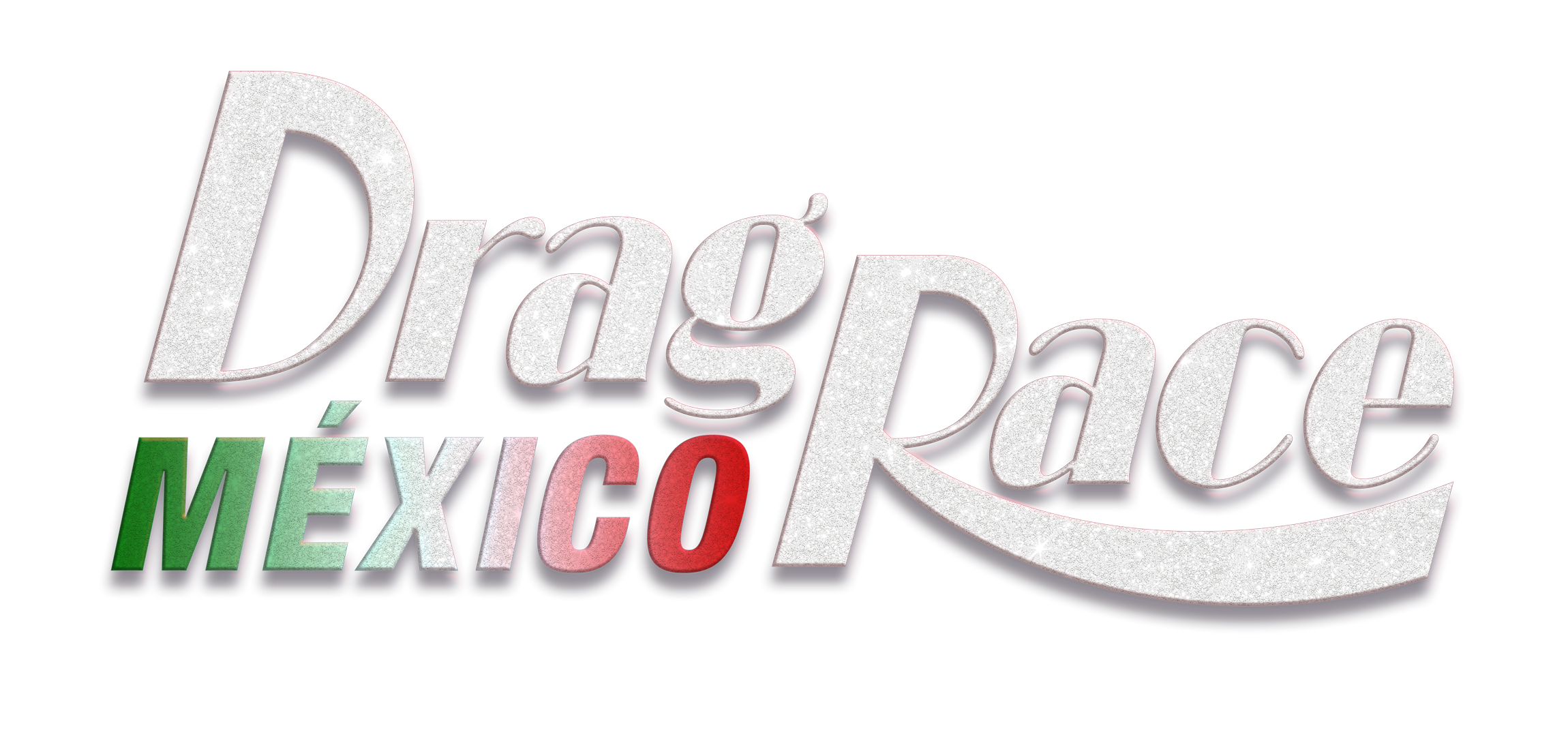
Logo for Drag Race México

Drag Race México is a Mexican reality competition television series based on the original American series RuPaul's Drag Race and part of the Drag Race franchise. It airs on MTV and Paramount+ in Mexico and Latin America, and on WOW Presents Plus internationally.

The first season premiered on 22 June 2023, and it concluded on 7 September 2023.

== Series overview ==
Season	Episodes	Originally released		
Season	Episodes	First released	Last released	Network
1	12	22 June 2023	7 September 2023	Paramount+
2	12	20 June 2024	5 September 2024	WOW Presents Plus

== Episodes ==
=== Season 1 (2023) ===
No. overall	No. in series	Title	Original release date
1	1	"My Land" "Drag Mi Tierra México"	22 June 2023
2	2	"My Drag Quinceañera" "Mi quinceañera drag"	29 June 2023
3	3	"Drag Business" "Noche de María Félix"	6 July 2023
4	4	"Dragapulco Shore" "Dragapulco Shore: El rusical"	13 July 2023
5	5	"Girl Band" "Girl Band mexicana"	20 July 2023
6	6	"Snatch Game – Mexico Season 1" "Snatch Game"	27 July 2023
7	7	"Mexican Telenovela" "Terapia Villanas De Telenovela"	3 August 2023
8	8	"Levi's Runway" "Re-Diseña Con Levi's"	10 August 2023
9	9	"Spicy Roast" "Roast y Stan Up Comedy"	17 August 2023
10	10	"Latinas Makeover" "Reinas de Belleza Latinas"	24 August 2023
11	11	"The Reunion" "Reunión"	31 August 2023
12	12	"Grand Finale"	7 September 2023

=== Season 2 (2024) ===
No. overall	No. in series	Title	Original release date
13	1	"From Terror to Glamour"	20 June 2024
14	2	"Dance and Silver"	27 June 2024
15	3	"Fair Ball"	4 July 2024
16	4	"Drag Saturday"	11 July 2024
17	5	"Snatch Game - Mexico Season 2"	18 July 2024
18	6	"National Drag"	25 July 2024
19	7	"Three Marias"	1 August 2024
20	8	"Good Afternoon Mexico"	8 August 2024
21	9	"First Mexican Roast"	15 August 2024
22	10	"Family Makeover"	22 August 2024
23	9	"The Reunion"	29 August 2024
24	12	"Grand Finale"	5 September 2024
