= Nina de la Fuente =

Mexican drag performer

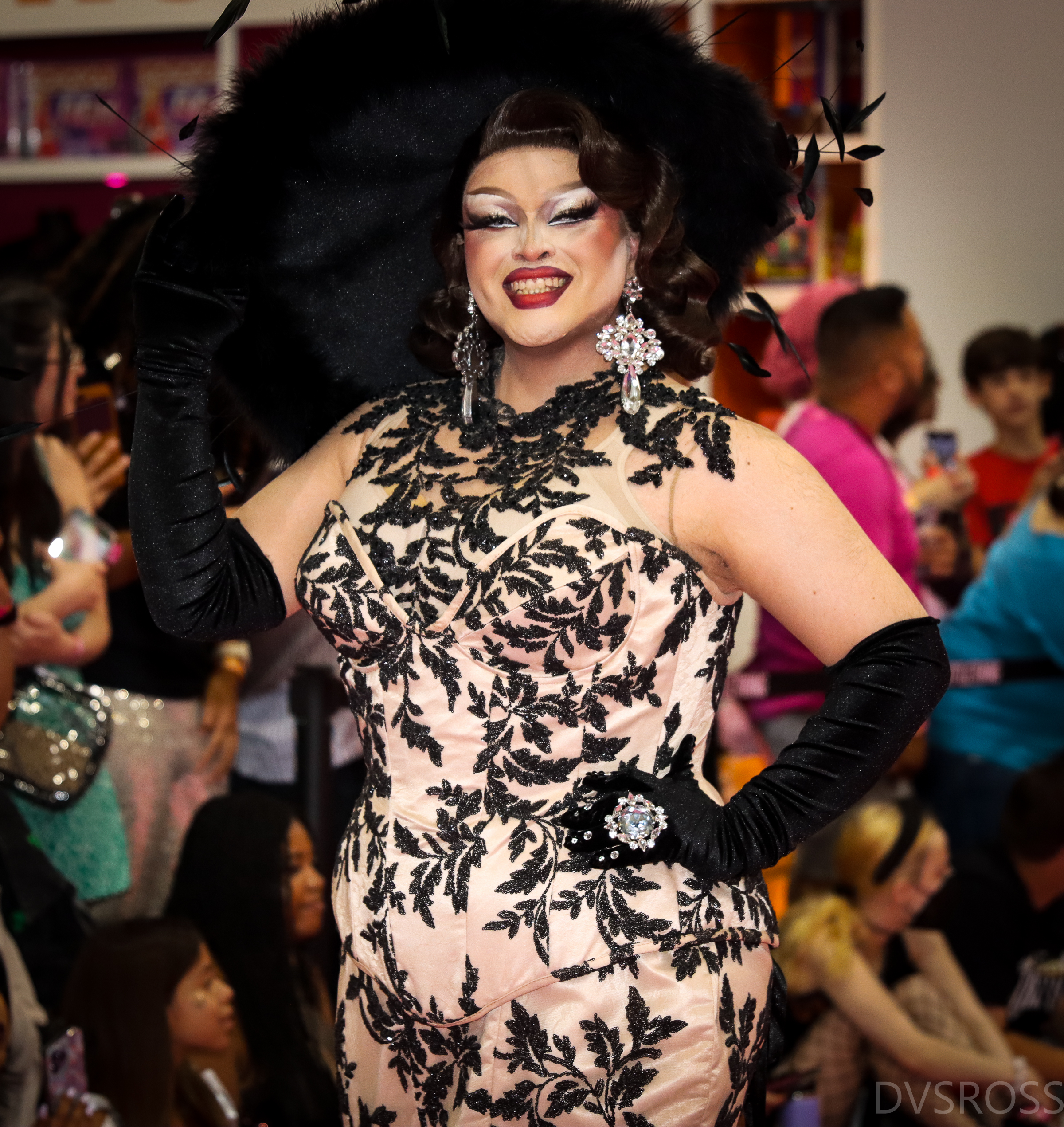
- Nina de la Fuente at RuPaul's DragCon LA, 2024
- Born: Vicente Arias
- Occupation: Drag performer

Nina de la Fuente is the stage name of Vicente Arias, a Mexican drag performer who competed on the second season of La Más Draga and the second season of Drag Race México.

== Personal life ==
Nina de la Fuente is from Mexico City.

== Filmography ==
=== Television ===
Year	Title	Role	Notes
2024	Drag Race Mexico season 2	Herself (contestant)	12th place (Miss Congeniality)

=== Web series ===
Year	Title	Role	Notes
2019	La Más Draga season 2	Herself (contestant)	9th place
2026	LA CASA DEL MIEDO	Herself (contestant)	
