= Burrita Burrona =

Mexican entertainer

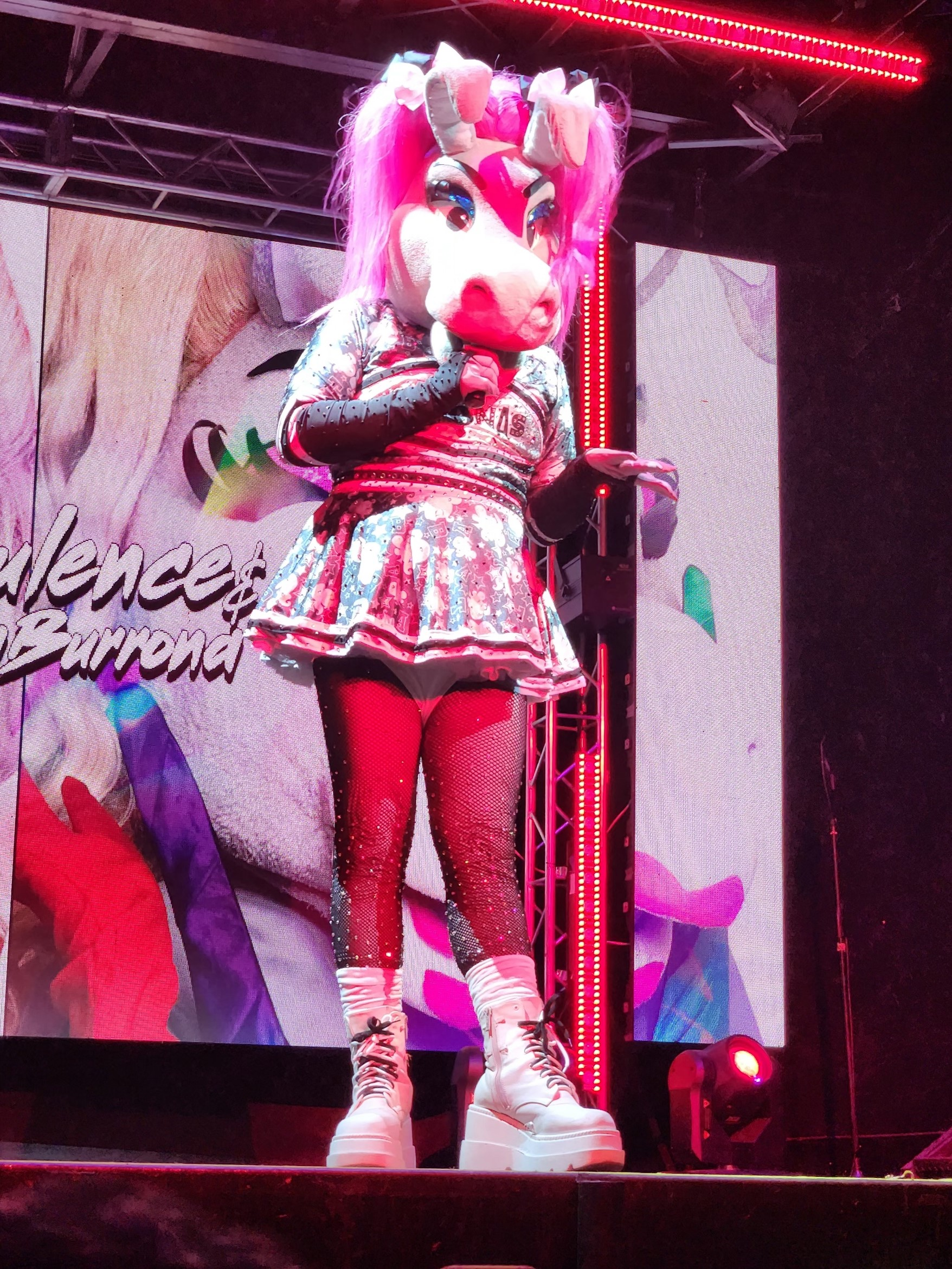
- Burrita Burrona performing in Santiago in 2024

Burrita Burrona is the stage name of Iván "Momo" Guzmán, a Mexican drag performer and entertainer. Burrita Burrona appeared as a guest judge on the second season of Drag Race México.
