= Luna Lansman =

Mexican drag performer

- Born: Abraham Sinue Luna Ortiz
- Occupation: Drag performer

Luna Lansman is the stage name of Abraham Sinue Luna Ortiz, a Mexican drag performer who competed on the third season of La Más Draga and the second season of Drag Race México.

== Personal life ==
Ortiz is from Mexico City.

== Filmography ==
=== Television ===
Year	Title	Role	Notes
2024	Drag Race Mexico	Herself (contestant)	Season 2 (7th place, Miss Congeniality)

=== Web series ===
Year	Title	Role	Notes
2020	La Más Draga season 3	Herself (contestant)	9th place

== Discography ==
=== As Featured Artist ===
Year	Title	Album	Writer(s)	Producer(s)
2024	"Ya No Quiero" (the cast of Drag Race Mexico season 2)	Non-Album/ Single	N/A	Omar Antonio Sosa Latourmerie
