= Mariana Stars =

Venezuelan-Spanish performer

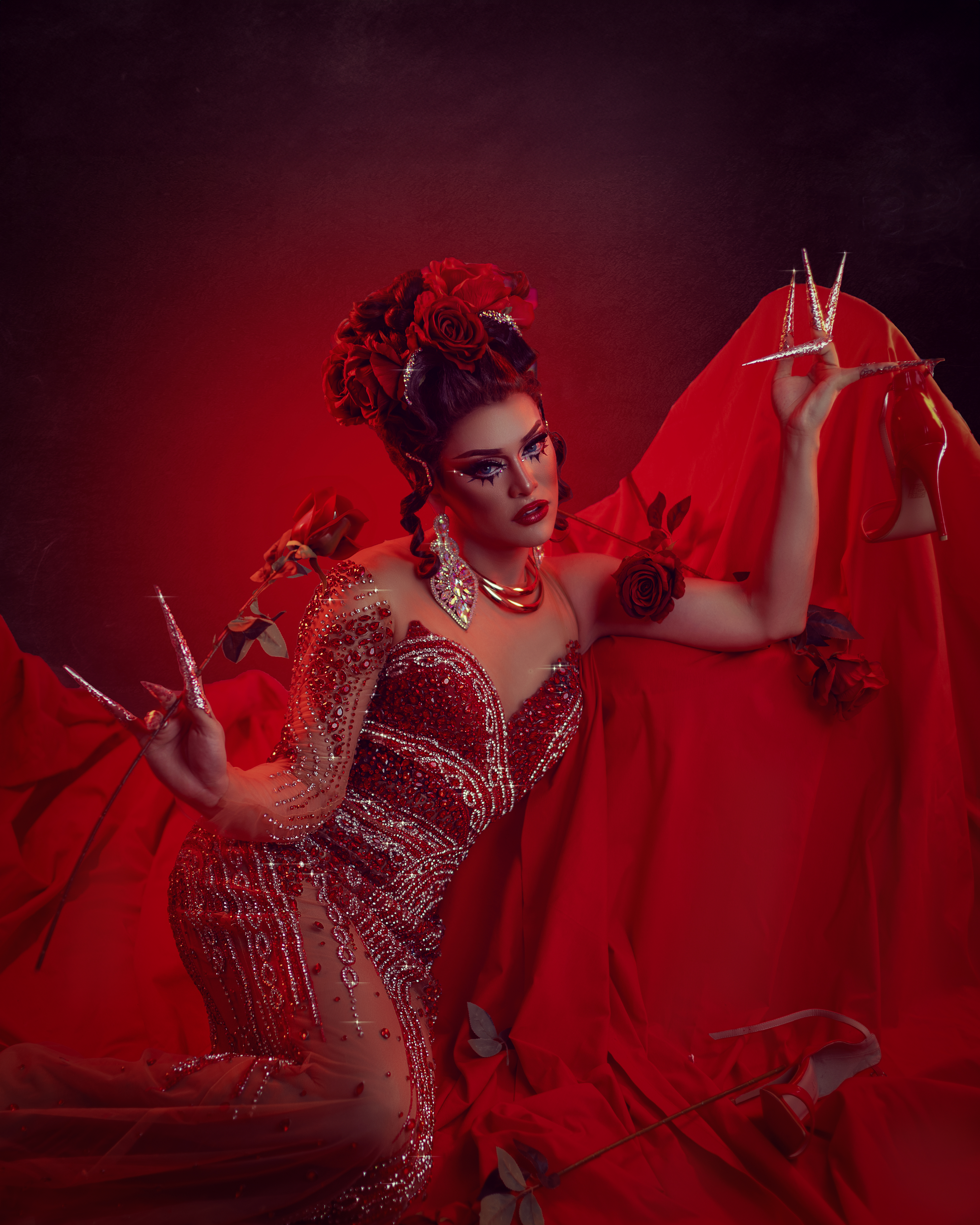
Mariana Stars

Mariana Stars is the stage name of Felipe Rey Sulbaran Mendez, a Venezuela-born Spanish drag performer who competed on the fourth season of Drag Race España and Drag Race México: Latina Royale. She is originally from Mérida, Venezuela.

== Filmography ==
- Drag Race España (season 4)
- Drag Race México: Latina Royale

== See also ==
- List of drag queens
