= La Más Draga season 2 =

La Más Draga
- Season 2
- Promotional poster for season two
- Hosted by: Vanessa Claudio
- Judges: Johnny Carmona; Bernardo "Letal" Vázquez; Yari Mejía
- No. of contestants: 9
- Winner: Alexis 3XL
- Runners-up: Gvajardo; Sophia Jiménez
- No. of episodes: 9

Release
- Original network: YouTube
- Original release: 30 April – 25 June 2019

Season chronology
- ← Previous; Season 1 Next → Season 3

The second season of La Más Draga premiered on 30 April and concluded on 25 June 2019. The competition was broadcast on YouTube, and was produced by La Gran Diabla Producciones. The series featured nine contestants, from all over Mexico, competing for the title of La Más Draga of Mexico and Latin America and a cash prize of $100,000 MXN Pesos. The winner of the second season of La Más Draga was Alexis 3XL, with Gvajardo and Sophia Jiménez as runners-up.

The judges panel of this season include Puerto Rican singer and model Vanessa Claudio, who was also the main host, TV and Internet personality Johnny Carmona, hair and makeup artist Yari Mejía, and drag performer Bernardo "Letal" Vázquez.

The season consisted of nine one-hour episodes.

== Contestants ==
Ages, names, and cities stated are at time of filming.

Contestants of La Más Draga season 2 and their backgrounds
| Contestant | Age | Hometown | Outcome |
|---|---|---|---|
| Alexis 3XL | 25 | Monterrey, Nuevo León | Winner |
| Gvajardo | 27 | Monterrey, Nuevo León | Runners-up |
| Sophia Jiménez | 25 | Guadalajara, Jalisco | Runners-up |
| Job Star | 27 | Saltillo, Coahuila | 4th place |
| Soro Nasty | 28 | Monterrey, Nuevo León | 5th place |
| Amelia (Note: Amelia Waldorf is referred to as Amelia on the show.) | 21 | Mexico City | 6th place (Note: Amelia was voted both La Más Querida and La Más Volada.) |
| Red Rabbit Duo (Note: Red Rabbit Duo is a drag duo consisting of Gala Varo and Génesis Faux. They competed as a single contestant.) | 29 | Guadalajara, Jalisco | 7th place |
| Red Rabbit Duo | 32 | Guadalajara, Jalisco | 7th place |
| Leandra Rose | 24 | Progreso, Yucatán | 8th place |
| Nina de la Fuente | 28 | Mexico City | 9th place |

== Contestant progress ==
Legend:

Alexis 3XL won Las Más Draga season 2.
Gvajardo and Sophia Jiménez were the runners-up.
Amelia was voted La Más Querida (LMQ).
Amelia was voted La Más Volada (LMV).
WIN indicates the contestant received the highest score and won the challenge.
SAFE indicates that the contestant was declared safe by the judges.
BTM (Bottom) indicates that the contestant received one of the lowest scores and was up for elimination.
BTM (Bottom) indicates that the contestant received one of the highest scores of the episode, but, due to breaking the rules, was up for elimination.
ELIM (Eliminated) indicates that the contestant received one of the lowest scores and was eliminated.
Guest indicates that the contestant returned as a guest.

Contestants progress with placements in each episode
| Contestant | Episode | | | | | | | | | |
| Contestant | 1 | 2 | 3 | 4 | 5 | 6 | 7 (Note: On episode 7, all the contestants were up for elimination and had to lip sync.) | 8 | 9 | |
|---|---|---|---|---|---|---|---|---|---|---|
| Alexis 3XL | BTM | SAFE | SAFE | WIN | SAFE | WIN | BTM | Guest | Winner | |
| Gvajardo | WIN | BTM | SAFE | BTM | SAFE | SAFE | BTM | Guest | Runner-up | |
| Sophia Jiménez | WIN | SAFE | WIN | SAFE | WIN | SAFE | BTM | Guest | Runner-up | |
| Job Star | SAFE | SAFE | SAFE | BTM | SAFE | BTM | ELIM | Guest | Guest | |
| Soro Nasty | SAFE | SAFE | BTM | SAFE | BTM | ELIM | | Guest | Guest | |
| Amelia | BTM | SAFE | SAFE | SAFE | ELIM | | | Guest | LMQ | LMV |
| Red Rabbit Duo | SAFE | WIN | SAFE | ELIM | | | | Guest | Guest | |
| Leandra Rose | SAFE | SAFE | ELIM | | | | | Guest | Guest | |
| Nina de la Fuente | SAFE | ELIM | | | | | | Guest | Guest | |

=== Scores history ===
Summary of weekly voting and results
| Contestant | 1 | 2 | 3 | 4 | 5 | 6 | 7 | | Total |
|---|---|---|---|---|---|---|---|---|---|
| Alexis 3XL | 14 | 13 | 18 | 18 | 15 | 19 | 18 | 11 | 126 |
| Gvajardo | 19 | 8 | 8 | 10 | 12 | 16 | 12 | 17 | 102 |
| Sophia Jiménez | 19 | 13 | 20 | 17 | 20 | 15 | 12 | 17 | 133 |
| Job Star | 6 | 16 | 12 | 10 | 18 | 8 | 18 | 11 | 99 |
| Soro Nasty | 12 | 10 | 5 | 11 | 6 | 13 | | | 57 |
| Amelia | 8 | 9 | 11 | 11 | 5 | | | | 44 |
| Red Rabbit Duo | 9 | 19 | 11 | 8 | | | | | 47 |
| Leandra Rose | 10 | 9 | 4 | | | | | | 23 |
| Nina de la Fuente | 11 | 8 | | | | | | | 19 |

== Lip syncs ==
| Episode | Contestants (Judges' votes to stay) | | | Song | Eliminated |
|---|---|---|---|---|---|
| 1 | Alexis 3XL (1 vote) | vs. | Amelia (1 vote) | "Macumba" (Susana Zabaleta) | None |
| 2 | Gvajardo (4 votes) | vs. | Nina de la Fuente (0 votes) | "Soy virgencita" (Astrid Hadad) | Nina de la Fuente |
| 2 | Gvajardo (4 votes) | vs. | Nina de la Fuente (0 votes) | "El calcetín" (Astrid Hadad) | Nina de la Fuente |
| 3 | Leandra Rose (0 votes) | vs. | Soro Nasty (4 votes) | "Soy luchadores" (Conjunto África) | Leandra Rose |
| 3 | Leandra Rose (0 votes) | vs. | Soro Nasty (4 votes) | "Tlacoyo con Co-k lait" (Regina Orozco) | Leandra Rose |
| 4 (Note: On episode 4, Red Rabbit Duo split in order to lip sync. On the first round it was Génesis Faux turn, while on the second it was Gala Varo's.) | Gvajardo (2 votes) vs. Job Star (4 votes) vs. Red Rabbit Duo (2 votes) | | | "Amor a la Mexicana" (Thalía) | Red Rabbit Duo |
| 4 | Gvajardo (2 votes) vs. Job Star (4 votes) vs. Red Rabbit Duo (2 votes) | | | "Lindo pero bruto" (Thalía) | Red Rabbit Duo |
| 4 | Gvajardo (3 votes) | vs. | Red Rabbit Duo (1 vote) | "¿A quién le importa?" (Thalía) | Red Rabbit Duo |
| 5 | Amelia (1 vote) | vs. | Soro Nasty (3 votes) | "Caray" (Juan Gabriel) | Amelia |
| 5 | Amelia (1 vote) | vs. | Soro Nasty (3 votes) | "Esta noche voy a verla" (Juan Gabriel) | Amelia |
| 6 | Job Star (3 votes) | vs. | Soro Nasty (1 vote) | "Me lloras" (Gloria Trevi ft. Charly Black) | Soro Nasty |
| 7 (Note: On episode 7, all the contestants were up for elimination and had to lip sync.) | Alexis 3XL vs. Gvajardo vs. Job Star vs. Sophia Jiménez | | | "Ese hombre no se toca" (Rocío Banquells) | Job Star |
| 7 | Alexis 3XL vs. Gvajardo vs. Job Star vs. Sophia Jiménez | | | "Déjame volver" (Dulce) | Job Star |

The contestant was eliminated after their first time in the bottom.
The contestant was eliminated after their second time in the bottom.
The contestant was eliminated after their third time in the bottom.

== Judges ==
=== Main judges ===
- Bernardo "Letal" Vázquez, drag queen and professional makeup artist
- Johnny Carmona, TV and Internet personality
- Yari Mejía, designer, stylist, singer and model

=== Guest judges ===
Listed in chronological order.

- Susana Zabaleta, soprano and actress
- Astrid Hadad, singer
- Regina Orozco, actress and singer
- Pepe y Teo, comedian duo and Internet personalities
- Pavel Arámbula, Chilenian drag performer
- Caelike, Internet personality
- Dulce, singer and actress
- Ricky Lips, drag performer and celebrity impersonator
- La Supermana, drag performer and singer

=== Special guests ===
Guests who will appear in episodes, but not judge on the main stage.

Episode 2

- Alejandro Reyes and Mario Bustamente, Impulse CDMX's representatives

Episode 3

- Pimpinela Escarlata, luchador
- Mamba, luchador

Episode 5

- Juka, stylist and model

Episode 6

- Ophelia Pastrana, physicist, YouTuber and comedian

Episode 7

- Christian Chávez, singer-songwriter and actor

Episode 9

- Bárbara Durango, runner-up on season 1
- Cordelia Durango, 7th place on season 1
- Deborah La Grande, winner of season 1
- Debra Men, 6th place and La Más Querida of season 1
- Eva Blunt, runner-up on season 1
- Lana, 5th place on season 1
- Margaret Y Ya, runner-up on season 1

== Episodes ==
| No. overall | No. in season | Title | Original release date |
|---|---|---|---|
| 8 | 1 | "La Más Típica" | 30 April 2019 |
Nine drag performers enter the workroom. For the first main challenge, the contestants present a look inspired by the regional costume of any Mexican state or region. They must then also perform a lip-sync in their own distinct drag style.: Alexis 3XL - Danza de los Voladores; "Te quiero puta! by Rammstein; Amelia - Chinelo de Tepoztlán; "La más perra" by Margaret Y Ya; Gvajardo - Agudora de Michoacán; "Patrona" by Gvajardo; Job Star - Matachín de Coahuila; "Noche de estrellas" by Job Star; Leandra Rose - Yucatán; "¿A quién le importa?" by Thalía; Nina de la Fuente - Novia Tehuana; "Copitas de mezcal" by Voz en Punto and Mariachi Vargas; Red Rabbit Duo - Cháman Huichol; "En la cara" by Major Lazer ft. Karol G; Soro Nasty - Chiapas; "Love" by Thalía; Sophia Jiménez - Jalisco; "Guadalajara" by Pepe Guízar; On the runway, category is La Más Típica (The Most Traditional). Alexis 3XL, Gvajardo and Sophia Jiménez receive positive critiques, with Gvajardo and Sophia Jiménez both winning the challenge. Amelia, Job Star and Red Rabbit Duo receive negative critiques, with Red Rabbit Duo being safe. Before Amelia and Job Star lip-sync, it is announced that Alexis 3XL and Amelia broke the confidentiality rules of the competition. Because of this, Alexis 3XL and Amelia were put in the bottom two, with Job Star being safe. Alexis 3XL and Amelia lip-sync to "Macumba" by Susana Zabaleta. Both contestants win the lip-sync and no one goes home.: Guest Judge: Susana Zabaleta; Main Challenge: Present a look inspired by the regional costume of any Mexican state or region, and perform a lip-sync in their own distinct drag style; Runway Theme: La Más Típica (The Most Traditional); Challenge Winners: Gvajardo and Sophia Jiménez; Bottom Two: Alexis 3XL and Amelia; Lip-Sync Song: "Macumba" by Susana Zabaleta; Eliminated: None
| 9 | 2 | "La Más Religiosa" | 7 May 2019 |
For this week's main challenge, the contestants present a look inspired by the Christian Catholic faith in Mexico.: Alexis 3XL - Santo Niño de Atocha (Holy Infant of Atocha); Amelia - Ángel Demonio (Fallen Angel); Gvajardo - Jesús Malverde; Job Star - Santa Muerte (Holy Death); Leandra Rose - Devoción Católica (Catholic Devotions); Nina de la Fuente - Virgen de la Macarena (Virgin of Macarena); Red Rabbit Duo - Cristo Negro (Black Christ); Soro Nasty - Estatua sollozante (Weeping Virgin); Sophia Jiménez - Sagrado Corazón de Jesús (Sacred Heart of Jesus); On the runway, category is La Más Religiosa (The Most Religious). Alexis 3XL, Job Star and Red Rabbit Duo receive positive critiques, with Red Rabbit Duo winning the challenge. Gvajardo, Leandra Rose and Nina de la Fuente receive negative critiques, with Leandra Rose being safe. Gvajardo and Nina de la Fuente lip-sync to "Soy Virgencita" by Astrid Hadad and "El Calcetín" by Astrid Hadad. Gvajardo wins the lip-sync and Nina de la Fuente is the first contestant to be eliminated.: Guest Judge: Astrid Hadad; Main Challenge: Present a look inspired by the Christian Catholic faith in Mexico; Runway Theme: La Más Religiosa (The Most Religious); Challenge Winner: Red Rabbit Duo; Bottom Two: Gvajardo and Nina de la Fuente; Lip-Sync Songs: "Soy Virgencita" by Astrid Hadad and "El Calcetín" by Astrid Hadad; Eliminated: Nina de la Fuente
| 10 | 3 | "La Más Luchona" | 14 May 2019 |
For this week's main challenge, the contestants present a look and performance inspired by the Lucha Libre. On the runway, category is La Más Luchona (The Most Wrestler). Alexis 3XL, Job Star and Sophia Jiménez receive positive critiques, with Sophia Jiménez winning the challenge. Gvajardo, Leandra Rose and Soro Nasty receive negative critiques, with Gvajardo being safe. Leandra Rose and Soro Nasty lip-sync to "Soy Luchadores" by Conjunto África and "Tlacoyo con C-ok Lait" by Regina Orozco. Soro Nasty wins the lip-sync and Leandra Rose is eliminated.: Guest Judge: Regina Orozco; Main Challenge: Present a look and performance inspired by the Lucha Libre; Runway Theme: La Más Luchona (The Most Wrestler); Challenge Winner: Sophia Jiménez; Bottom Two: Leandra Rose and Soro Nasty; Lip-Sync Songs: "Soy Luchadores" by Conjunto África and "Tlacoyo con C-ok Lait" by Regina Orozco; Eliminated: Leandra Rose
| 11 | 4 | "La Más Piñata" | 21 May 2019 |
For this week's main challenge, the contestants create an outfit using piñata materials, paired with a Season 1 contestant.: Alexis 3XL and Bárbara Durango; Amelia and Cordelia Durango; Gvajardo and Debra Men; Job Star and Margaret Y Ya; Red Rabbit Duo and Lana; Soro Nasty and Eva Blunt; Sophia Jiménez and Deborah La Grande; On the runway, category is La Más Piñata (The Most Piñata). Alexis 3XL and Sophia Jiménez receive positive critiques, with Alexis 3XL winning the challenge. Gvajardo, Job Star and Red Rabbit Duo receive negative critiques, and are announced as the bottom three. They lip-sync to "Amor A La Mexicana" by Thalía and "Lindo Pero Bruto" by Thalía. Job Star wins the lip-sync. It is then announced that Gvajardo and Red Rabbit Duo will lip-sync again, to determine who will be eliminated. They lip-sync to "¿A Quién Le Importa?" by Thalía. Gvajardo wins the lip-sync and Red Rabbit Duo is eliminated.: Guest Judge: Pepe and Teo; Main Challenge: Create an outfit using piñata materials, paired with a Season 1 contestant; Runway Theme: La Más Piñata (The Most Piñata); Challenge Winner: Alexis 3XL; Bottom Three: Gvajardo, Job Star and Red Rabbit Duo; Lip-Sync Songs: "Amor A La Mexicana" by Thalía, "Lindo Pero Bruto" by Thalía, and "¿A Quién Le Importa?" by Thalía; Eliminated: Red Rabbit Duo
| 12 | 5 | "La Más Juanga" | 28 May 2019 |
For this week's mini-challenge, the contestants makeover male models with inspiration from Frida Kahlo. Alexis 3XL wins the mini-challenge. For the main challenge, the contestants present an outfit inspired by famous Mexican singer Juan Gabriel.: Alexis 3XL - Palm tree meme and sequined suit with calla lilies motif; Amelia - 1970s Juan Gabriel; Gvajardo - 2014 Los Angeles concert; Job Star - 1990 concert at Palacio de Bellas Artes; Soro Nasty - 1990 concert at Palacio de Bellas Artes; Sophia Jiménez - Rocío Dúrcal's 1991 concert at Auditorio Nacional and 1997 concert at Palacio de Bellas Artes; On the runway, category is La Más Juanga (The Most Juan Gabriel). Job Star and Sophia Jiménez receive positive critiques, with Sophia Jiménez winning the challenge. Amelia and Soro Nasty receive negative critiques, and are announced as the bottom two. They lip-sync to "Caray" by Juan Gabriel and "Esta Noche Voy A Verla" by Juan Gabriel. Soro Nasty wins the lip-sync and Amelia is eliminated.: Guest Judge: Pavel Arámbula; Mini-Challenge: Makeover male models with inspiration from Frida Kahlo; Mini-Challenge winner: Alexis 3XL; Mini-Challenge prize: A $10,000 gift card courtesy of No Name Store; Main Challenge: Present an outfit inspired by famous Mexican singer Juan Gabriel; Runway Theme: La Más Juanga (The Most Juan Gabriel); Challenge Winner: Sophia Jiménez; Bottom Two: Amelia and Soro Nasty; Lip-Sync Songs: "Caray" by Juan Gabriel and "Esta Noche Voy A Verla" by Juan Gabriel; Eliminated: Amelia
| 13 | 6 | "La Más Independiente" | 4 June 2019 |
For this week's main challenge, the contestants present an outfit inspired by the Mexican War of Independence and give a LGBT rights and pride speech.: Alexis 3XL - El Ángel de la Independencia (The Angel of Independence); Gvajardo - Constitución de México (Constitution of Mexico); Job Star - Miguel Hidalgo y Costilla; Soro Nasty - Adelitas; Sophia Jiménez - Vicente Guerrero; On the runway, category is La Más Independiente (The Most Independent). Alexis 3XL and Gvajardo receive positive critiques, with Alexis 3XL winning the challenge. Job Star and Soro Nasty receive negative critiques, and are announced as the bottom two. They lip-sync to "Me Lloras" by Gloria Trevi ft. Charly Black. Job Star wins the lip-sync and Soro Nasty is eliminated.: Guest Judge: CaELiKe; Main Challenge: Present an outfit inspired by the Mexican War of Independence and give a LGBT rights and pride speech; Runway Theme: La Más Independiente (The Most Independent); Challenge Winner: Alexis 3XL; Bottom Two: Job Star and Soro Nasty; Lip-Sync Song: "Me Lloras" by Gloria Trevi ft. Charly Black; Eliminated: Soro Nasty
| 14 | 7 | "La Más Villana" | 11 June 2019 |
For this week's main challenge, the contestants present an outfit inspired by the villains of Telenovelas as well as improvise as an antagonist character in a sketch.: Alexis 3XL - Lucio Fernández from Serafín; Gvajardo - Rubí from Rubí; Job Star - Catalina Creel from Cuna de Lobos; Sophia Jimenez - Támara de la Colina from El Privilegio de Amar; On the runway, category is La Más Villana (The Most Villainous). It is then announced that the remaining four contestants will lip-sync to determine who will move on to the finale. They then lip-sync to "Ese Hombre No Se Toca" by Rocío Banquells and "Déjame Volver Contigo" by Dulce. Alexis 3XL, Gvajardo and Sophia Jiménez win the lip-sync and Job Star is eliminated.: Guest Judge: Dulce; Main Challenge: Present an outfit inspired by the villains of Telenovelas as well as improvise as an antagonist character in a sketch; Runway Theme: La Más Villana (The Most Villainous); Bottom Four: Alexis 3XL, Gvajardo, Job Star and Sophia Jiménez; Lip-Sync Songs: "Ese Hombre No Se Toca" by Rocío Banquells and "Déjame Volver Contigo" by Dulce; Eliminated: Job Star
| 15 | 8 | "Día de Muertas" | 18 June 2019 |
All the contestants, after walking the runway on the category Día de Muertas (Day of the Dead), return to talk about what happened this season. Discussions include, Nina De La Fuente's shocking elimination and family issues, Leandra Rose's shyness, aesthetic and accent, Red Rabbit Duo's origin, experience and chemistry, Amelia's casting, drag family and depression prior to the show, Soro Nasty's fashion and her giving up in the lip-sync against Job Star, Job Star's inner saboteur and being close to winning several challenges, Sophia Jiménez' consistency and acting as a mother to the rest of the queens, Gvajardo's relationship with the other contestants and her torturous run on the show, Alexis 3XL's cosplay background and almost giving up, and the top three's plans for the finale.: Runway Theme: Día de Muertas (Day of the Dead)
| 16 | 9 | "La Gran Final" | 25 June 2018 |
For the final challenge of the season, the contestants produce, direct, and star in their own original performance, and then present a look inspired by Mexican culture.: Alexis 3XL - Jaguar Warrior; Gvajardo - Quetzalcóatl; Sophia Jiménez - Mexican Golden Eagle; The contestants walk the runway one last time. It is revealed that Amelia is this season's La Más Querida (Miss Congeniality). It is then revealed that Amelia is also this season's La Más Volada (a prize sponsored by Viva Aerobus). It is announced that Alexis 3XL is the winner, leaving Gvajardo and Sophia Jiménez as the runners-up.: Guest Judges: Pepe and Teo, Ricky Lips and La Supermana; Main Challenge: Produce, direct, and star in their own original performance, and then present a look inspired by Mexican culture; Runway Theme: Lo Que Más Amo de México (What I Most Love About Mexico); La Más Querida: Amelia; La Más Volada: Amelia; Runners-up: Gvajardo and Sophia Jiménez; Winner of La Más Draga Season Two: Alexis 3XL
