= Drag Race México season 1 =

First season of Drag Race Mexico

Drag Race México
- Season 1
- Promotional poster for season one
- Hosted by: Valentina; Lolita Banana
- Judges: Valentina; Lolita Banana; Oscar Madrazo
- No. of contestants: 11
- Winner: Cristian Peralta
- Runners-up: Gala Varo; Matraka; Regina Voce
- Miss Congeniality: Lady Kero
- No. of episodes: 12

Release
- Original network: MTV and Paramount+ (Mexico/Latin America); WOW Presents Plus (International)
- Original release: 22 June – 7 September 2023

Season chronology
- Next → Season 2

The first season of Drag Race México premiered on 22 June 2023. The season aired on MTV and Paramount+ in Mexico and Latin America and WOW Presents Plus internationally. The season was confirmed by World of Wonder on 8 August 2022.

The winner of the first season of Drag Race México was Cristian Peralta, with Gala Varo, Matraka and Regina Voce as the runners-up. Lady Kero was named Miss Congeniality.

== Production ==
World of Wonder, the production company behind RuPaul's Drag Race, posted three casting calls on social media on 8 August 2022. The casting calls were for new potential Drag Race adaptations in Brazil, Germany, and Mexico. The deadline for the potential competitors was set for 26 August, with the deadline for audition video submission set for 9 September 2022. Many Drag Race fans called for Valentina or Lolita Banana to host the show.

In December, it was confirmed that the new editions of the Drag Race franchise would premiere "on MTV/Paramount+ in their respective territories". The series marks the third Spanish-language adaptation of the American show, after The Switch Drag Race and Drag Race España.

On 7 May 2023, a teaser was revealed at the 2023 MTV Movie & TV Awards, announcing that the series would premiere in 2023. Rolling Stone announced that Valentina and Lolita Banana would host the first season. Oscar Madrazo was also confirmed to be on the judging panel.

Eleven contestants were announced on 24 May 2023. Participants include La Más Draga alumns Margaret Y Ya and Gala Varo, the latter participating in the second season of the series as part of the Red Rabbit Duo.

== Contestants ==
Ages, names, and cities stated are at time of filming.

Contestants of Drag Race México season 1 and their backgrounds
Contestant	Age	Hometown	Outcome
Cristian Peralta	35	Guadalajara, Jalisco	Winner
Gala Varo	33	Morelia, Michoacán	Runners-up
Matraka (Note: Matraka Traka is referred to as Matraka on the show.)	24	León, Guanajuato	Runners-up
Regina Voce	41	Mexico City	Runners-up
Lady Kero	33	Ocotlán de Morelos, Oaxaca	5th place (Note: Lady Kero was voted Miss Congeniality by fellow contestants.)
Margaret Y Ya	28	Mexico City	6th place
Argennis (Note: Argennis Ruvalcaba Martinez, also known as Argennis Drag, is referred to as Argennis on the show.)	26	Ciudad Juárez, Chihuahua	7th place
Serena Morena	34	Aguascalientes, Aguascalientes	8th place
Pixie Pixie	32	Mexico City	9th place
Vermelha Noir	24	Querétaro, Querétaro	10th place
Miss Vallarta	25	Puerto Vallarta, Jalisco	11th place

== Contestant progress ==
Legend:

Cristian Peralta won Drag Race México season 1.
Gala Varo, Matraka and Regina Voce were the runners-up.
Lady Kero was voted Miss Congeniality (Miss C) by fellow contestants.
Matraka was voted Fan Favourite (FF) by the viewers.
WIN indicates that the contestant won the challenge.
TOP2 indicates that the contestant was one of the two best performing in the challenge, but lost the lip sync to win it.
SAFE indicates that the contestant was declared safe by the judges.
BTM (Bottom) indicates that the contestant was up for elimination.
ELIM (Eliminated) indicates that the contestant was eliminated.
Guest indicates that the contestant returned as a guest.

Contestants progress with placements in each episode
Contestant	Episode												
Contestant	1	2	3	4	5	6	7	8	9	10	11	12	
Cristian Peralta	WIN	SAFE	SAFE	WIN	SAFE	WIN	SAFE	SAFE	WIN	WIN	Guest	Winner	
Gala Varo	SAFE	SAFE	SAFE	SAFE	WIN	BTM	SAFE	TOP2	BTM	SAFE	Guest	Runner-up	
Matraka	SAFE	SAFE	SAFE	SAFE	WIN	SAFE	WIN	WIN	SAFE	BTM	Guest	R-up	FF (Note: The Fan Favourite award was not announced on the show.)
Regina Voce	SAFE	SAFE	WIN	SAFE	SAFE	SAFE	SAFE	SAFE	SAFE	BTM	Guest	Runner-up	
Lady Kero	SAFE	SAFE	SAFE	SAFE	SAFE	SAFE	BTM	SAFE	ELIM		Miss C	Guest	
Margaret Y Ya	SAFE	SAFE	SAFE	SAFE	SAFE	SAFE	ELIM				Guest	Guest	
Argennis	SAFE	WIN	SAFE	BTM	BTM	ELIM					Guest	Guest	
Serena Morena	SAFE	BTM	BTM	SAFE	ELIM						Guest	Guest	
Pixie Pixie	SAFE	SAFE	SAFE	ELIM							Guest	Guest	
Vermelha Noir	BTM	SAFE	ELIM								Guest	Guest	
Miss Vallarta	BTM	ELIM									Guest	Guest	

== Lip syncs ==
Legend:

The contestant was eliminated after their first time in the bottom.
The contestant was eliminated after their second time in the bottom.
The contestant was eliminated after their third time in the bottom.
The contestant won the lip sync to win the challenge.
The contestant won the Lip Sync for the Crown and was declared the winner of the season.

Episode	Contestants			Song	Eliminated
1	Miss Vallarta	vs.	Vermelha Noir	"En la obscuridad" (Belinda)	None
2	Miss Vallarta	vs.	Serena Morena	"Mírala, míralo" (Alejandra Guzmán)	Miss Vallarta
3	Serena Morena	vs.	Vermelha Noir	"XT4S1S" (Danna Paola)	Vermelha Noir
4	Argennis	vs.	Pixie Pixie	"Mío" (Paulina Rubio)	Pixie Pixie
5	Argennis	vs.	Serena Morena	"Amor prohibido" (Selena)	Serena Morena
6	Argennis	vs.	Gala Varo	"Ábranse perras" (Gloria Trevi)	Argennis
7	Lady Kero	vs.	Margaret Y Ya	"Quítame ese hombre" (Pilar Montenegro)	Margaret Y Ya
Episode	Contestants			Song	Winner
8	Gala Varo	vs.	Matraka	"Bizcochito" (Rosalía)	Matraka
Episode	Contestants			Song	Eliminated
9	Gala Varo	vs.	Lady Kero	"De mí enamórate" (Daniela Romo)	Lady Kero
10	Matraka	vs.	Regina Voce	"El bombón asesino" (Ninel Conde)	None
Episode	Finalists			Song	Winner
12	Cristian Peralta vs. Gala Varo vs. Matraka vs. Regina Voce			"Él me mintió" (Amanda Miguel)	Cristian Peralta

== Guest judges ==
Guest judges are listed in chronological order.

- Christian Chávez, singer and actor
- Rojstar, tik-toker and comedian
- Danna Paola, singer and actress
- Karime Pindter, TV personality
- Alejandra Bogue, TV host and actress
- Mauricio Martínez, actor and singer
- Alan Estrada, actor and singer
- Mabel Cadena, actress and singer
- Manu NNa, influencer and comedian
- Laura Carmine, actress and TV host

=== Special guests ===
Guests who appeared in episodes, but did not judge on the main stage.

Episode 1 and 8

- Walter Gomez, photographer

Episode 4 and 12

- Nelson Parra, choreographer

Episode 5

- Juanita Delgado, singer and record producer

Episode 6

- Norvina, president of Anastasia Beverly Hills

Episode 12

- Thalía, singer and actress

== Episodes ==
No. overall	No. in series	Title	Original release date
1	1	"My Land" "Drag Mi Tierra México"	22 June 2023
Eleven queens enter the workroom. For the first mini-challenge, the queens do a piñata-inspired photoshoot. Margaret Y Ya wins the mini-challenge. For the main challenge, the queens present a runway look representing their hometown and region. On the runway, category is Mi Tierra (My Homeland). Cristian Peralta, Lady Kero and Matraka receive positive critiques, with Cristian Peralta winning the challenge. Margaret Y Ya, Miss Vallarta and Vermelha Noir receive negative critiques, with Margaret Y Ya being safe. Miss Vallarta and Vermelha Noir lip-sync to "En la obscuridad" by Belinda. They are both declared the winners of the lip-sync and no one goes home.: Guest Judge: Christian Chávez; Mini-Challenge: Piñata-inspired photoshoot; Mini-Challenge Winner: Margaret Y Ya; Mini-Challenge Prize: A MX$ 18,000 cash tip; Main Challenge: Present a runway look representing your hometown and region; Runway Theme: Mi Tierra (My Homeland); Challenge Winner: Cristian Peralta; Bottom Two: Miss Vallarta and Vermelha Noir; Lip-Sync Song: "En la obscuridad" by Belinda; Eliminated: None
2	2	"My Drag Quinceañera" "Mi quinceañera drag"	29 June 2023
For this week's main challenge, the queens design a Quinceañera look with unconventional materials and party supplies. On the runway, category is Quinceañera Drag (Drag Quinceañera). Argennis, Cristian Peralta and Margaret Y Ya receive positive critiques, with Argennis winning the challenge. Miss Vallarta, Serena Morena and Vermelha Noir receive negative critiques, with Vermelha Noir being safe. Miss Vallarta and Serena Morena lip-sync to "Mírala, míralo" by Alejandra Guzmán. Serena Morena wins the lip-sync and Miss Vallarta is the first queen to sashay away.: Guest Judge: Rojstar; Main Challenge: Design a Quinceañera look with unconventional materials and party supplies; Runway Theme: Quinceañera Drag (Drag Quinceañera); Challenge Winner: Argennis; Challenge Prize: A MX$ 18,000 cash tip; Bottom Two: Miss Vallarta and Serena Morena; Lip-Sync Song: "Mírala, míralo" by Alejandra Guzmán; Eliminated: Miss Vallarta; Farewell Message: "Real las amo a todas. PD: Tráiganme talco, terminé bien rosada. #PinkTeam" ("I really love you all. PS: Bring me some baby powder, I ended up quite chafed. #PinkTeam")
3	3	"Drag Business" "Noche de María Félix"	6 July 2023
For this week's mini-challenge, the queens pair up and participate in a taco eating contest. Regina Voce and Vermelha Noir win the mini-challenge. For the main challenge, the queens pair up to create and star in a commercial promoting a different business.: Extasiada Aerolínea (Ecstasy Airlines) - Argennis and Cristian Peralta; Taquería Las Tortillas (The Tortillas Taco Shop) - Regina Voce and Vermelha Noir; Taller El Parachoques (The Bumper Garage) - Lady Kero and Serena Morena; Uñas La Tigresa (The Tigress Nail Salon) - Gala Varo and Margaret Y Ya; Funeraria San Ramos (Saint Ramos Funeral Home) - Matraka and Pixie Pixie; On the runway, category is La Noche de las Mil María Félix (The Night of the Thousand María Félix). Argennis, Cristian Peralta and Regina Voce receive positive critiques, with Regina Voce winning the challenge. Margaret Y Ya, Serena Morena and Vermelha Noir receive negative critiques, with Margaret Y Ya being safe. Serena Morena and Vermelha Noir lip-sync to "XT4S1S" by Danna Paola. Serena Morena wins the lip-sync and Vermelha Noir sashays away.: Guest Judge: Danna Paola; Mini-Challenge: In pairs, participate in a taco eating contest; Mini-Challenge Winners: Regina Voce and Vermelha Noir; Mini-Challenge Prize: A MX$ 18,000 cash tip; Main Challenge: In pairs, create and star in a commercial promoting a different business; Runway Theme: La Noche de las Mil María Félix (The Night of the Thousand María Félix); Challenge Winner: Regina Voce; Bottom Two: Serena Morena and Vermelha Noir; Lip-Sync Song: "XT4S1S" by Danna Paola; Eliminated: Vermelha Noir; Farewell Message: "Reinas, denlo todo, porque sé que todas están cabronas. Muchas gracias a todas por todo. Siempre pueden contar conmigo. Atte. Vermelha Noir" ("Queens, give it your all, because I know that you are all talented bitches. Thank you all so much for everything. You can always count on me. Sincerely, Vermelha Noir")
4	4	"Dragapulco Shore" "Dragapulco Shore: El rusical"	13 July 2023
For this week's mini-challenge, the queens read each other to filth. Margaret Y Ya wins the mini-challenge. For the main challenge, the queens perform in Dragapulco Shore: El Rusical (Dragapulco Shore: The Rusical).: Argennis plays Rosa (Ful); Cristian Peralta plays La Gran Matrioshka (The Great Matryoshka); Gala Varo plays Vulvandra Panochavez (Vulvandra Pussychavez); Lady Kero plays Gar; Margaret Y Ya plays Go (Goy); Matraka plays Betty (Gofu); Pixie Pixie plays La (Le); Regina Voce plays La Reina (The Queen); Serena Morena plays Dolo (Pain); On the runway, category is Oro (Gold). Cristian Peralta, Gala Varo and Regina Voce receive positive critiques, with Cristian Peralta winning the challenge. Argennis, Pixie Pixie and Serena Morena receive negative critiques, with Serena Morena being safe. Argennis and Pixie Pixie lip-sync to "Mío" by Paulina Rubio. Argennis wins the lip-sync and Pixie Pixie sashays away.: Guest Judge: Karime Pindter; Mini-Challenge: Reading is Fundamental; Mini-Challenge Winner: Margaret Y Ya; Mini-Challenge Prize: A MX$ 18,000 cash tip; Main Challenge: Dragapulco Shore: El Rusical (Dragapulco Shore: The Rusical); Runway Theme: Oro (Gold); Challenge Winner: Cristian Peralta; Bottom Two: Argennis and Pixie Pixie; Lip-Sync Song: "Mío" by Paulina Rubio; Eliminated: Pixie Pixie; Farewell Message: "Ahí les dejo los Pixielindros. No se van a librar de mí, culeras. Las amo, chingonas, échenle huevos. Los ama, Pixie Pixie." ("You can keep my Pixielinders. You haven't seen the last of me, bitches. I love you, rockstars, do your fucking best. Much love, Pixie Pixie.")
5	5	"Girl Band" "Girl Band mexicana"	20 July 2023
For this week's mini-challenge, the queens drag up a pair of tribal boots and wear them in a Latin dance-off. Argennis and Matraka win the mini-challenge. For the main challenge, the queens write, record, and perform verses to "Así soy yo" (That's Me).: Team Las Meximamis (The Meximamis) - Margaret Y Ya, Matraka, Regina Voce and Serena Morena; Team Las Palanquetas (The Palanquetas) - Argennis, Cristian Peralta, Gala Varo and Lady Kero; On the runway, category is Flores de México (Flowers of Mexico). Gala Varo, Margaret Y Ya and Matraka receive positive critiques, with Gala Varo and Matraka both winning the challenge. Argennis, Lady Kero and Serena Morena receive negative critiques, with Lady Kero being safe. Argennis and Serena Morena lip-sync to "Amor prohibido" by Selena. Argennis wins the lip-sync and Serena Morena sashays away.: Guest Judge: Alejandra Bogue; Mini-Challenge: Drag up a pair of tribal boots and wear them in a Latin dance-off; Mini-Challenge Winners: Argennis and Matraka; Mini-Challenge Prize: A MX$ 9,000 cash tip; Main Challenge: Write, record, and perform verses to "Así soy yo" (That's Me); Runway Theme: Flores de México (Flowers of Mexico); Challenge Winners: Gala Varo and Matraka; Bottom Two: Argennis and Serena Morena; Lip-Sync Song: "Amor prohibido" by Selena; Eliminated: Serena Morena; Farewell Message: "Chicas, ya las quiero muchote. A vibrar la puchita. SM." ("Girls, I love you so much already. Let the pussy tremble. SM.")
6	6	"Snatch Game – Mexico Season 1" "Snatch Game"	27 July 2023
For this week's mini-challenge, the queens apply quick drag makeup without mirrors. Regina Voce wins the mini-challenge. For the main challenge, the queens play the Snatch Game. Óscar Madrazo and Valentina star as the celebrity contestants. The cast consists of: Argennis as Gloria Trevi; Cristian Peralta as Verónica Castro; Gala Varo as La Llorona; Lady Kero as Luna Gil; Margaret Y Ya as Martha Debayle; Matraka as Adela Micha; Regina Voce as Walter Mercado; On the runway, category is Sobrenatural (Supernatural). Cristian Peralta, Lady Kero and Matraka receive positive critiques, with Cristian Peralta winning the challenge. Argennis, Gala Varo and Margaret Y Ya receive negative critiques, with Margaret Y Ya being safe. Argennis and Gala Varo lip-sync to "Ábranse perras" by Gloria Trevi. Gala Varo wins the lip-sync and Argennis sashays away.: Guest Judge: Mauricio Martínez; Mini-Challenge: Apply quick drag makeup without mirrors; Mini-Challenge Winner: Regina Voce; Mini-Challenge Prize: A MX$ 18,000 cash tip; Main Challenge: Snatch Game; Runway Theme: Sobrenatural (Supernatural); Challenge Winner: Cristian Peralta; Bottom Two: Argennis and Gala Varo; Lip-Sync Song: "Ábranse perras" by Gloria Trevi; Eliminated: Argennis; Farewell Message: "Chicas, las amo. Serán siempre mi familia y en verdad espero alla o aiga nose como, sido algo bueno para ustedes y yo también quiero. ♡" ("Girls, I love you. You will always be my family and I really hope it was or whas, I don't know how to write it, it was something good for you and I want it too. ♡")
7	7	"Mexican Telenovela" "Terapia Villanas De Telenovela"	3 August 2023
For this week's main challenge, the queens act as soap opera villains in the telenovela "Villa No Más" (Villa No More).: Cristian Peralta plays Pereza; Gala Varo plays Zafiro; Lady Kero plays Crinolina Creel; Margaret Y Ya Paola Brecha; Matraka plays Temeraria; Regina Voce plays Zoraida Monterrubio; On the runway, categories are Chica Joven (Young Girl), Señora de la Casa (Lady of the House) and Maldita Villana (Damn Villain). Gala Varo, Matraka and Regina Voce receive positive critiques, with Matraka winning the challenge. Cristian Peralta, Lady Kero and Margaret Y Ya receive negative critiques, with Cristian Peralta being safe. Lady Kero and Margaret Y Ya lip-sync to "Quítame ese hombre del corazón" by Pilar Montenegro. Lady Kero wins the lip-sync and Margaret Y Ya sashays away.: Guest Judge: Alan Estrada; Main Challenge: Act as soap opera villains in the telenovela "Villa no más" (Villain no more); Runway Themes: Chica Joven (Young Girl), Señora de la Casa (Lady of the House) and Maldita Villana (Damn Villain); Challenge Winner: Matraka; Challenge Prize: A MX$ 18,000 cash tip; Bottom Two: Lady Kero and Margaret Y Ya; Lip-Sync Song: "Quítame ese hombre del corazón" by Pilar Montenegro; Eliminated: Margaret Y Ya; Farewell Message: "Ni modo :( LOL. No hagan chistes sin mí. -🐰 Y YA. ♡" ("Oh well :( LOL. Don't make jokes without me. -🐰 Y YA. ♡")
8	8	"Levi's Runway" "Re-Diseña Con Levi's"	10 August 2023
For this week's mini-challenge, the queens do a photoshoot posing as wrestlers in a ring. Lady Kero wins the mini-challenge. For the main challenge, the queens create a look made from denim from Levi's. On the runway, category is Denim Eleganza Extravaganza. Cristian Peralta, Gala Varo, Lady Kero, Matraka and Regina Voce receive positive critiques. It is then announced that Gala Varo and Matraka are the top two queens of the week and will lip-sync for the win. They lip-sync to "Bizcochito" by Rosalía. After the lip-sync, Matraka is announced as the winner of the challenge. Lolita Banana and Valentina then announce that no one will be going home.: Guest Judge: Mabel Cadena; Mini-Challenge: Photoshoot posing as wrestlers in a ring; Mini-Challenge Winner: Lady Kero; Mini-Challenge Prize: A MX$ 18,000 cash tip; Main Challenge: Create a look made from denim from Levi's; Runway Theme: Denim Eleganza Extravaganza; Top Two: Gala Varo and Matraka; Lip-Sync Song: "Bizcochito" by Rosalía; Challenge Winner: Matraka; Challenge Prize: A MX$ 25,000 cash tip
9	9	"Spicy Roast" "Roast y Stan Up Comedy"	17 August 2023
For this week's mini-challenge, the queens impersonate each other with puppets. Matraka and Regina Voce win the mini-challenge. For the main challenge, the queens perform a stand-up comedy routine. On the runway, category is Picante (Spicy). Cristian Peralta and Regina Voce receive positive critiques, with Cristian Peralta winning the challenge. Gala Varo, Matraka and Lady Kero receive negative critiques, with Matraka being safe. Gala Varo and Lady Kero lip-sync to "De mí enamórate" by Daniela Romo. Gala Varo wins the lip-sync and Lady Kero sashays away.: Guest Judge: Manu NNa; Mini-Challenge: Everybody Loves Puppets; Mini-Challenge Winners: Matraka and Regina Voce; Mini-Challenge Prize: A MX$ 9,000 cash tip; Main Challenge: Perform a stand-up comedy routine; Runway Theme: Picante (Spicy); Challenge Winner: Cristian Peralta; Bottom Two: Gala Varo and Lady Kero; Lip-Sync Song: "De mí enamórate" by Daniela Romo; Eliminated: Lady Kero; Farewell Message: "Mi top 4, les AMO con toda el alma. Rómpanla. Atte. Lady Kero, su milanesa empanizada." ("My top 4, I LOVE you with all my soul. Destroy it. Much love. Lady Kero, your breaded-beef steak.")
10	10	"Latinas Makeover" "Reinas de Belleza Latinas"	24 August 2023
For this week's main challenge, the queens make over Drag Race fans from Chile, Colombia, Mexico and Venezuela. On the runway, category is Miss Drag Latinoamérica (Miss Drag Latin America). Cristian Peralta and Gala Varo receive positive critiques, with Cristian Peralta winning the challenge. Matraka and Regina Voce receive negative critiques, and are announced as the bottom two. They lip-sync to "El bombón asesino" by Ninel Conde. They are both declared the winners of the lip-sync and no one goes home.: Guest Judge: Laura Carmine; Main Challenge: Makeover a Drag Race fan from Chile, Colombia, Mexico or Venezuela; Runway Theme: Miss Drag Latinoamérica (Miss Drag Latin America); Challenge Winner: Cristian Peralta; Challenge Prize: A MX$ 18,000 cash tip; Bottom Two: Matraka and Regina Voce; Lip-Sync Song: "El bombón asesino" by Ninel Conde; Eliminated: None
11	11	"The Reunion" "Reunión"	31 August 2023
All the queens return to talk about what happened this season. Lady Kero is named this season's Miss Congeniality.: Miss Congeniality: Lady Kero
12	12	"Grand Finale"	7 September 2023
The finalists each meet with Valentina and Lolita Banana to discuss their experiences on the show, then prepare a performance of "¿A quién le importa?" by Thalía. On the runway, category is Mi mejor drag (My Best Drag). After the judges' critiques, all four finalists lipsync to "Él me mintió" by Amanda Miguel. Cristian Peralta wins the season and is declared "Mexico's Next Drag Superstar".: Runway Theme: Mi mejor drag (My Best Drag); Lip Sync Song: "Él me mintió" by Amanda Miguel; Runners-up: Gala Varo, Matraka, and Regina Voce; Winner of Drag Race México Season One: Cristian Peralta
