= Drag Race México season 2 =

Second season of Drag Race Mexico

Drag Race México
- Season 2
- Promotional poster for season two
- Hosted by: Lolita Banana; Taiga Brava
- Judges: Lolita Banana; Taiga Brava; Oscar Madrazo
- No. of contestants: 13
- Winner: Leexa Fox
- Runners-up: Eva Blunt; Horacio Potasio; Jenary Bloom
- Miss Congeniality: Luna Lansman; Nina de la Fuente
- No. of episodes: 12

Release
- Original network: WOW Presents Plus
- Original release: 20 June – 5 September 2024

Season chronology
- ← Previous; Season 1

The second season of Drag Race México premiered on 20 June 2024, airing on WOW Presents Plus internationally. The season was confirmed by World of Wonder on 31 July 2023.

The winner of the second season of Drag Race México was Leexa Fox. Eva Blunt, Horacio Potasio, and Jenary Bloom were the runners-up. Luna Lansman and Nina de la Fuente were voted as the season's Miss Congeniality. Garçonne was voted Miss Look Perdido.

== Production ==
On 31 July 2023, it was announced via the show's official Instagram page that casting for the second season was open. Applications remained open for four weeks before closing on 30 August 2022.

The production company, World of Wonder, released a 20-second teaser on social media. The clip showcases the hosts, Lolita Banana and Queen of the Universe season 2 winner Taiga Brava (the latter replacing season one host Valentina), in a vintage university-themed set. On the same day, it was announced that Óscar Madrazo would reprise his role during season 2.

Thirteen contestants were announced on 23 May 2024. Participants include La Más Draga alumna Elektra Vandergeld, Eva Blunt, Leexa Fox, Luna Lansman, and Nina de la Fuente.

== Contestants ==
Ages, names, and cities stated are at time of filming.

Contestants of Drag Race México season 2 and their backgrounds
Contestant	Age	Hometown	Outcome
Leexa Fox	22	Mexicali, Baja California	Winner
Eva Blunt	35	Mexico City	Runners-up
Horacio Potasio (Note: Gonzalez is referred to as Horacio Potasio on the show.)	20	Chihuahua City, Chihuahua	Runners-up
Jenary Bloom	27	Tepatitlán, Jalisco	Runners-up
Elektra Vandergeld	26	Mexico City	5th place
Unique	27	Aguascalientes, Aguascalientes	6th place
Luna Lansman	36	Mexico City	7th place (Note: Luna Lansman and Nina de la Fuente were voted Miss Congeniality by fellow contestants.)
Suculenta	27	Mexico City	8th place
Ava Pocket	29	Ciudad Madero, Tamaulipas	9th place
Garçonne (Note: Garçonne Terrible is referred to as Garçonne on the show.)	29	Querétaro, Querétaro	10th place (Note: Garçonne was voted Miss Lost Look by fellow contestants.)
María Bonita	31	Monterrey, Nuevo León	11th place
Nina de la Fuente	33	Mexico City	12th place
Ignus Ars	23	Aguascalientes, Aguascalientes	13th place

== Contestant progress ==
Legend:

Leexa Fox won Drag Race México season 2.
Eva Blunt, Horacio Potasio and Jenary Bloom were the runners-up.
Luna Lansman and Nina de la Fuente were voted Miss Congeniality (Miss C) by fellow contestants.
Garçonne won Miss Lost Look (MLL) for having the best unaired look of the season.
WIN indicates that the contestant won the challenge.
SAFE indicates that the contestant was declared safe by the judges.
BTM (Bottom) indicates that the contestant was up for elimination.
ELIM (Eliminated) indicates that the contestant was eliminated.
Guest indicates that the contestant returned as a guest.

Contestants progress with placements in each episode
Contestant	Episode											
Contestant	1	2	3	4	5	6	7	8	9	10	11	12
Leexa Fox	SAFE	SAFE	WIN	SAFE	SAFE	SAFE	SAFE	BTM	SAFE	SAFE	Guest	Winner
Eva Blunt	SAFE	SAFE	SAFE	SAFE	SAFE	WIN	SAFE	SAFE	SAFE	WIN	Guest	Runner-up
Horacio Potasio	SAFE	WIN	SAFE	SAFE	SAFE	SAFE	BTM	BTM	WIN	SAFE	Guest	Runner-up
Jenary Bloom	SAFE	SAFE	SAFE	WIN	SAFE	SAFE	WIN	WIN	BTM	BTM	Guest	Runner-up
Elektra Vandergeld	WIN	SAFE	SAFE	SAFE	BTM	SAFE	SAFE	SAFE	SAFE	ELIM	Guest	Guest
Unique	SAFE	BTM	SAFE	BTM	SAFE	BTM	SAFE	WIN	ELIM		Guest	Guest
Luna Lansman	SAFE	SAFE	BTM	SAFE	WIN	WIN	ELIM				Miss C	Guest
Suculenta	SAFE	SAFE	SAFE	SAFE	SAFE	ELIM					Guest	Guest
Ava Pocket	BTM	SAFE	SAFE	SAFE	ELIM						Guest	Guest
Garçonne	SAFE	SAFE	SAFE	ELIM							MLL	Guest
María Bonita	SAFE	SAFE	ELIM								Guest	Guest
Nina de la Fuente	SAFE	ELIM									Miss C	Guest
Ignus Ars	ELIM										Guest	Guest

== Lip syncs ==
Legend:

The contestant was eliminated after their first time in the bottom.
The contestant was eliminated after their second time in the bottom.
The contestant was eliminated after their fourth time in the bottom.
The contestant won the Lip Sync for the Crown and was declared the winner of the season.

Episode	Contestants			Song	Eliminated
1	Ava Pocket	vs.	Ignus Ars	"Me río de ti" (Gloria Trevi)	Ignus Ars
2	Nina de la Fuente	vs.	Unique	"Mujer Latina" (Thalía)	Nina de la Fuente
3	Luna Lansman	vs.	María Bonita	"Ni una Sola Palabra" (Paulina Rubio)	María Bonita
4	Garçonne	vs.	Unique	"La Calle de las Sirenas" (Kabah)	Garçonne
5	Ava Pocket	vs.	Elektra Vandergeld	"Reina de Corazones" (Alejandra Guzmán)	Ava Pocket
6	Suculenta	vs.	Unique	"Agüita" (Danna Paola)	Suculenta
7	Horacio Potasio	vs.	Luna Lansman	"Me Hipnotizas" (Anahi)	Luna Lansman
8	Horacio Potasio	vs.	Leexa Fox	"One, Two, Three, Go!" (Belanova)	None
9	Jenary Bloom	vs.	Unique	"Techno Cumbia" (Selena)	Unique
10	Elektra Vandergeld	vs.	Jenary Bloom	"Azúcar amargo" (Fey)	Elektra Vandergeld
Episode	Finalists			Song	Winner
12	Eva Blunt vs. Horacio Potasio vs. Jenary Bloom vs. Leexa Fox			"Bzrp Music Sessions, Vol. 53" (Shakira)	Leexa Fox

== Guest judges ==
Guest judges are listed in chronological order.

- Lucía Méndez, actress and singer
- Herly RG, singer, tiktoker and influencer
- Polo Morín, actor
- Victoria Volkova, actress, DJ and influencer
- Turbulence Queen, drag queen and influencer
- Burrita Burrona, drag queen and influencer
- Jhonny Caz, singer
- Chantal Andere, actress and singer
- La Supermana, TV personality
- Manolo Caro, TV director
- Benito Santos, fashion designer

=== Special guests ===
Guests who appeared in episodes, but did not judge on the main stage.

Episode 9

- Cristian Peralta, winner of Drag Race México season 1
- Gala Varo, runner-up on Drag Race México season 1
- Matraka, runner-up on Drag Race México season 1
- Regina Voce, runner-up on Drag Race México season 1

Episode 12

- Cristian Peralta, winner of Drag Race México season 1
- Regina Voce, runner-up on Drag Race México season 1

== Episodes ==
No. overall	No. in series	Title	Original release date
13	1	"From Terror to Glamour"	20 June 2024
Thirteen new queens enter the workroom. For the first main challenge, the queens present two looks on the runway: Mis Raíces (My Roots) and Jotéame el Look (Sissy that Frock). On the runway, Elektra Vandergeld, Garçonne and Leexa Fox receive positive critiques, with Elektra Vandergeld winning the challenge. Ava Pocket, Ignus Ars and Suculenta receive negative critiques, with Suculenta being safe. Ava Pocket and Ignus Ars lip-sync to "Me río de ti" by Gloria Trevi. Ava Pocket wins the lip-sync and Ignus Ars is the first queen to sashay away.: Guest Judge: Lucía Méndez; Main Challenge: Present two looks on the runway; Runway Themes: Mis Raíces (My Roots) and Jotéame el Look (Sissy that Frock); Challenge Winner: Elektra Vandergeld; Challenge Prize: A MX$ 18,000 cash tip; Bottom Two: Ava Pocket and Ignus Ars; Lip-Sync Song: "Me río de ti" by Gloria Trevi; Eliminated: Ignus Ars; Farewell Message: "Que se sepa que dejo mi corazón ❤️ Lo que se hace con amor perdura en el alma" ("Let it be known that I leave my heart ❤️ What is done with love lasts in the soul")
14	2	"Dance and Silver"	27 June 2024
For this week's mini-challenge, the queens play a round of Drag Race trivia. Horacio Potasio wins the mini-challenge. For the main challenge, the queens perform in a dance crew battle.: Team Las C.U.N.T.S (The C.U.N.T.S) - Ava Pocket, Elektra Vandergeld, Garçonne, Horacio Potasio, Leexa Fox and Suculenta; Team Las Putitronicas (The Putitronicas) - Eva Blunt, Jenary Bloom, Luna Lansman, María Bonita, Nina de la Fuente and Unique; On the runway, category is Chicas de Plata (Silver Girls). Ava Pocket, Elektra Vandergeld and Horacio Potasio receive positive critiques, with Horacio Potasio winning the challenge. Nina de la Fuente, Suculenta and Unique receive negative critiques, with Suculenta being safe. Nina de la Fuente and Unique lip-sync to "Mujer Latina" by Thalía. Unique wins the lip-sync and Nina de la Fuente sashays away.: Guest Judge: Herly RG; Mini-Challenge: Drag Race trivia; Mini-Challenge Winners: Horacio Potasio; Main Challenge: Perform in a dance crew battle; Runway Theme: Chicas de Plata (Silver Girls); Challenge Winner: Horacio Potasio; Bottom Two: Nina de la Fuente and Unique; Lip-Sync Song: "Mujer Latina" by Thalía; Eliminated: Nina de la Fuente; Farewell Message: "Amor, nunca permitas que te digan que no puedes. Atte. Nina de la Fuente" ("Darling, don't ever allow anyone to tell you that you're not worthy. Sincerely, Nina de la Fuente")
15	3	"Fair Ball"	4 July 2024
For this week's mini-challenge, the queens do a photoshoot posing as alien hunters in space. Eva Blunt and Unique win the mini-challenge. For the main challenge, the queens create three looks for The Fair Ball: Fair Food (Comida de Feria), Fair Game (Juego de Feria) and Fair Prize (Premio de Feria). On the runway, Eva Blunt, Horacio Potasio and Leexa Fox receive positive critiques, with Leexa Fox winning the challenge. Jenary Bloom, Luna Lansman and María Bonita receive negative critiques, with Jenary Bloom being safe. Luna Lansman and María Bonita lip-sync to "Ni una Sola Palabra" by Paulina Rubio. Luna Lansman wins the lip-sync and María Bonita sashays away.: Guest Judge: Polo Morín; Mini-Challenge: Photoshoot posing as alien hunters in space; Mini-Challenge Winners: Eva Blunt and Unique; Mini-Challenge Prize: A MX$ 9,000 cash tip; Main Challenge: The Fair Ball; Runway Themes: Fair Food (Comida de Feria), Fair Game (Juego de Feria) and Fair Prize (Premio de Feria); Challenge Winner: Leexa Fox; Bottom Two: Luna Lansman and María Bonita; Lip-Sync Song: "Ni una Sola Palabra" by Paulina Rubio; Eliminated: María Bonita; Farewell Message: "Nunca dejen de brillar! Si ya saben como soy, pos me invitan!" ("Don't stop shining! You already know me, so invite me!")
16	4	"Drag Saturday"	11 July 2024
For this week's mini-challenge, the queens read each other to filth. Elektra Vandergeld and Eva Blunt win the mini-challenge. For the main challenge, the queens write, record, and perform verses to "Ya No Quiero" (I Want No More) and "Lonely".: Team Obvias Siete (Obvias Seven) - Ava Pocket, Eva Blunt, Horacio Potasio, Luna Lansman and Suculenta performing "Ya No Quiero" (I Want No More); Team PNS: Papá No Sabe (PNS: Dad Doesn't Know) - Elektra Vandergeld, Garçonne, Leexa Fox, Jenary Bloom and Unique performing "Lonely"; On the runway, category is Futudrag Folklorica 5000 (Folk-futuristic Drag 5000). Elektra Vandergeld, Eva Blunt and Jenary Bloom receive positive critiques, with Jenary Bloom winning the challenge. Ava Pocket, Garçonne and Unique receive negative critiques, with Ava Pocket being safe. Garçonne and Unique lip-sync to "La Calle de las Sirenas" by Kabah. Unique wins the lip-sync and Garçonne sashays away.: Guest Judge: Victoria Volkova; Mini-Challenge: Reading is Fundamental; Mini-Challenge Winners: Elektra Vandergeld and Eva Blunt; Mini-Challenge Prize: A MX$ 9,000 cash tip; Main Challenge: Write, record, and perform verses to "Ya No Quiero" (I Want No More) and "Lonely"; Runway Theme: Futudrag Folklorica 5000 (Folk-futuristic Drag 5000); Challenge Winner: Jenary Bloom; Bottom Two: Garçonne and Unique; Lip-Sync Song: "La Calle de las Sirenas" by Kabah; Eliminated: Garçonne; Farewell Message: "Recuerden: vale más un gran corazón que una cara bonita... pero ustedes no. No tienen opción, pinches perros feos" ("Remember: it's more worthy a big heart than a pretty face... but not for you. You're hopeless, ugly dogs")
17	5	"Snatch Game - Mexico Season 2"	18 July 2024
For this week's main challenge, the queens play the Snatch Game. Turbulence and Burrita Burrona star as the celebrity contestants. The cast consisted of: Ava Pocket as Paulina Rubio; Elektra Vandergeld as Carmen Campuzano; Eva Blunt as Jesus of Iztapalapa; Horacio Potasio as Paco de Miguel; Jenary Bloom as Katy Perry; Leexa Fox as La Veneno; Luna Lansman as José José; Suculenta as Perro Bermúdez; Unique as Pedro Sola; On the runway, category is Antisistema (Anti-System). Leexa Fox, Luna Lansman and Unique receive positive critiques, with Luna Lansman winning the challenge. Ava Pocket, Elektra Vandergeld and Horacio Potasio receive negative critiques, with Horacio Potasio being safe. Ava Pocket and Elektra Vandergeld lip-sync to "Reina de Corazones" by Alejandra Guzmán. Elektra Vandergeld wins the lip-sync, and Ava Pocket sashays away.: Guest Judges: Turbulence and Burrita Burrona; Main Challenge: Snatch Game; Runway Theme: Antisistema (Anti-System); Challenge Winner: Luna Lansman; Bottom Two: Ava Pocket and Elektra Vandergeld; Lip-Sync Song: "Reina de Corazones" by Alejandra Guzmán; Eliminated: Ava Pocket; Farewell Message: "Reinas, las amo con todo mi corazón de bolsillo! Me voy feliz de ser parte de esta familia ❤️ Ava Pocket" ("Queens, I love you with my pocket-sized heart! I'm so happy for being part of this family ❤️ Ava Pocket")
18	6	"National Drag"	25 July 2024
For this week's main challenge, the queens create an outfit made from sports equipment.: Elektra Vandergeld - Boxing; Eva Blunt - Volleyball; Horacio Potasio - Football; Jenary Bloom - Roller skating; Leexa Fox - Bicycle racing; Luna Lansman - Tennis; Suculenta - Swimming; Unique - Gymnastics; On the runway, category is Nacionales del Drag (National Drag). Eva Blunt, Horacio Potasio and Luna Lansman receive positive critiques, with Eva Blunt and Luna Lansman both winning the challenge. Elektra Vandergeld, Suculenta and Unique receive negative critiques, with Elektra Vandergeld being safe. Suculenta and Unique lip-sync to "Agüita" by Danna Paola. Unique wins the lip-sync, and Suculenta sashays away.: Guest Judge: Jhonny Caz; Main Challenge: Create an outfit made from sports equipment; Runway Theme: Nacionales del Drag (National Drag); Challenge Winners: Eva Blunt and Luna Lansman; Bottom Two: Suculenta and Unique; Lip-Sync Song: "Agüita" by Danna Paola; Eliminated: Suculenta; Farewell Message: Vida solo una. Crean en ustedes. ¡La mejor temporada! P.D. No saben poner ni un hilo en la máquina de coser" ("There is only one life. Believe in yourselves. The best season! P.S. You don't know how to put a single thread in the sewing machine")
19	7	"Three Marias"	1 August 2024
For this week's main challenge, the queens perform in Las Tres Marías: El Rusical (The Three Marias: The Rusical).: Elektra Vandergeld as Andrógina Sepúlveda; Eva Blunt as María Me Enciendes; Horacio Potasio as Subraya; Jenary Bloom as Maldiva; Leexa Fox as Mariconcha; Luna Lansman as María la del Bar-Gay; Unique as Pulgosa; On the runway, category is Amarillo como el Sol (Yellow like the sun). Elektra Vandergeld, Eva Blunt and Jenary Bloom receive positive critiques, with Jenary Bloom winning the challenge. Horacio Potasio, Leexa Fox and Luna Lansman receive negative critiques, with Leexa Fox being safe. Horacio Potasio and Luna Lansman lip-sync to "Me Hipnotizas" by Anahí. Horacio Potasio wins the lip-sync, and Luna Lansman sashays away.: Guest Judge: Chantal Andere; Main Challenge: Las Tres Marías: El Rusical (The Three Marias: The Rusical); Runway Theme: Amarillo como el sol (Yellow like the sun); Challenge Winner: Jenary Bloom; Bottom Two: Horacio Potasio and Luna Lansman; Lip-Sync Song: "Me Hipnotizas" by Anahí; Eliminated: Luna Lansman
20	8	"Good Afternoon Mexico"	8 August 2024
For this week's mini-challenge, the queens do their makeup with only one hand while riding a fake bus. Elektra Vandergeld and Unique win the mini-challenge. For the main challenge, the queens improvise as television presenters in "¡Buenas Tardes, México!" ("Good Afternoon Mexico").: Host - Unique; Co-Host - Jenary Bloom; Fitness Instructor - Leexa Fox; Head Chef - Elektra Vandergeld; Sous-Chef - Eva Blunt; Weather Girl - Horacio Potasio; On the runway, category is Dulces de México (Mexican Candy). Jenary Bloom and Unique receive positive critiques, with both queens winning the challenge. Elektra Vandergeld, Horacio Potasio and Leexa Fox receive negative critiques, with Elektra Vandergeld being safe. Horacio Potasio and Leexa Fox lip-sync to "One, Two, Three, Go!" by Belanova. Both queens win the lip-sync and no one goes home.: Guest Judge: La Supermana; Mini-Challenge: Do your makeup with only one hand while riding a fake bus; Mini-Challenge Winners: Elektra Vandergeld and Unique; Mini-Challenge Prize: A MX$ 9,000 cash tip; Main Challenge: Improvise as television presenters in "¡Buenas Tardes, México!" ("Good Afternoon Mexico"); Runway Theme: Dulces de México (Mexican Candy); Challenge Winners: Jenary Bloom and Unique; Bottom Two: Horacio Potasio and Leexa Fox; Lip-Sync Song: "One, Two, Three, Go!" by Belanova; Eliminated: None
21	9	"First Mexican Roast"	15 August 2024
For this week's main challenge, the queens perform a roast of Cristian Peralta, Gala Varo, Matraka and Regina Voce. On the runway, category is La Noche de las Mil Selenas (Night of a Thousand Selenas). Elektra Vandergeld and Horacio Potasio receive positive critiques, with Horacio Potasio winning the challenge. Jenary Bloom, Leexa Fox and Unique receive negative critiques, with Leexa Fox being safe. Jenary Bloom and Unique lip-sync to "Techno Cumbia" by Selena. Jenary Bloom wins the lip-sync and Unique sashays away.: Guest Judge: Manolo Caro; Main Challenge: Perform a roast of Cristian Peralta, Gala Varo, Matraka and Regina Voce; Runway Theme: La Noche de las Mil Selenas (Night of a Thousand Selenas); Challenge Winner: Horacio Potasio; Bottom Two: Jenary Bloom and Unique; Lip-Sync Song: "Techno Cumbia" by Selena; Eliminated: Unique
22	10	"Family Makeover"	22 August 2024
For this week's main challenge, the queens makeover a loved one into a drag wrestler. On the runway, category is Luchadóras Exoticas (Exotic Fighters). Eva Blunt, Horacio Potasio, and Leexa Fox receive positive critiques, with Eva Blunt winning the challenge. Elektra Vandergeld and Jenary Bloom receive negative critiques, and are announced as the bottom two. Elektra Vandergeld and Jenary Bloom lip-sync to "Azúcar amargo" by Fey. Jenary Bloom wins the lip-sync and Elektra Vandergeld sashays away.: Guest Judge: Benito Santos; Main Challenge: Makeover a loved one into a drag wrestler; Runway Theme: Luchadóras Exoticas (Exotic Fighters); Challenge Winner: Eva Blunt; Bottom Two: Elektra Vandergeld and Jenary Bloom; Lip-Sync Song: "Azúcar amargo" by Fey; Eliminated: Elektra Vandergeld
23	9	"The Reunion"	29 August 2024
The queens all return for the reunion. It is announced that Luna Lansman and Nina de la Fuente are this season's Miss Congeniality. It is also announced that Garçonne is this season's Miss Lost Look for having the best unaired look.: Miss Congeniality: Luna Lansman and Nina de la Fuente; Miss Lost Look: Garçonne
24	12	"Grand Finale"	5 September 2024
For the final challenge of the season, the queens perform a talent in front of the judges.: Eva Blunt - Lip-sync / whip play; Horacio Potasio - Lip-sync / interpretive dance; Jenary Bloom - Original song lip-sync; Leexa Fox - Live singing; On the runway, category is Glamour de Final (Finale Glamour). The eliminated queens all return to the runway. The four finalists are told that they will be lip-syncing to "Bzrp Music Sessions, Vol. 53" by Shakira. It is announced that Leexa Fox is the winner, leaving Eva Blunt, Horacio Potasio and Jenary Bloom as the runners-up.: Main Challenge: Perform a talent in front of the judges; Runway Theme: Glamour de Final (Finale Glamour); Lip Sync Song: "Bzrp Music Sessions, Vol. 53" by Shakira; Runners-up: Eva Blunt, Horacio Potasio, and Jenary Bloom; Winner of Drag Race México Season Two: Leexa Fox
