= Margaret Y Ya =

Mexican drag performer

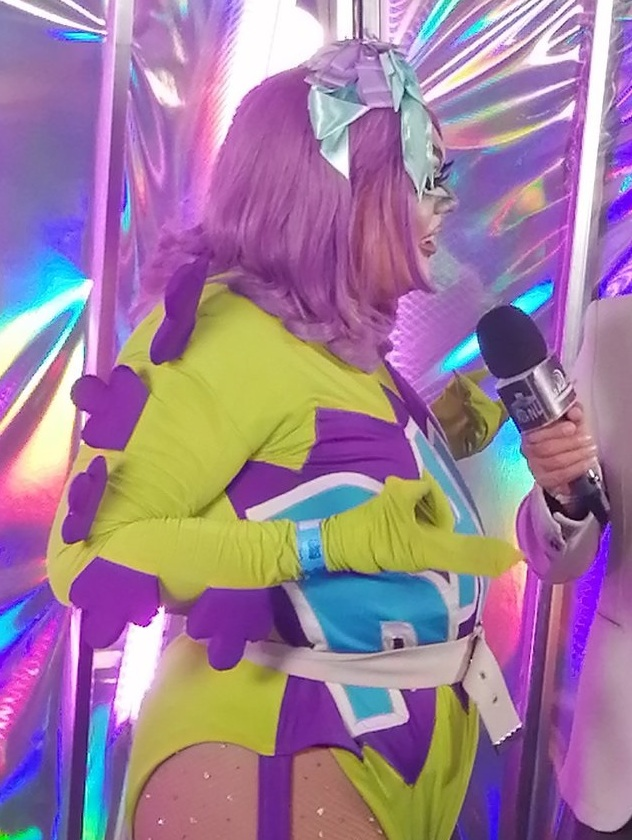
- Margaret Y Ya in 2022
- Born: Edo Peltier; Mexico City, Mexico
- Occupation: Drag queen

Margaret Y Ya is the stage name of Edo Peltier, a Mexican drag performer who competed in season 1 of La Más Draga and season 1 of Drag Race México.

== Personal life ==
Peltier is transgender and non-binary, and based in Mexico City.

== Filmography ==
=== Television ===
Year	Title	Role	Notes
2020	Love for the Arts	Contestant (Season 1)	4th Place
2023	Drag Race México	Contestant (Season 1)	6th Place
2025	Bring Back My Girls	Guest	Season 4 Episode 5

=== Web series ===
Year	Title	Role	Notes
2018	La Más Draga	Contestant (Season 1)	Runner-Up

=== Music videos ===
Year	Title	Artist	Producer
2017	LA MÁS PERRA	Margaret Y Ya	ENØ
2018	Onvres (Video Official)	Margaret Y Ya	Alan Aldana

== See also ==
- List of drag queens
