= Drag Race México =

Mexican reality competition television series

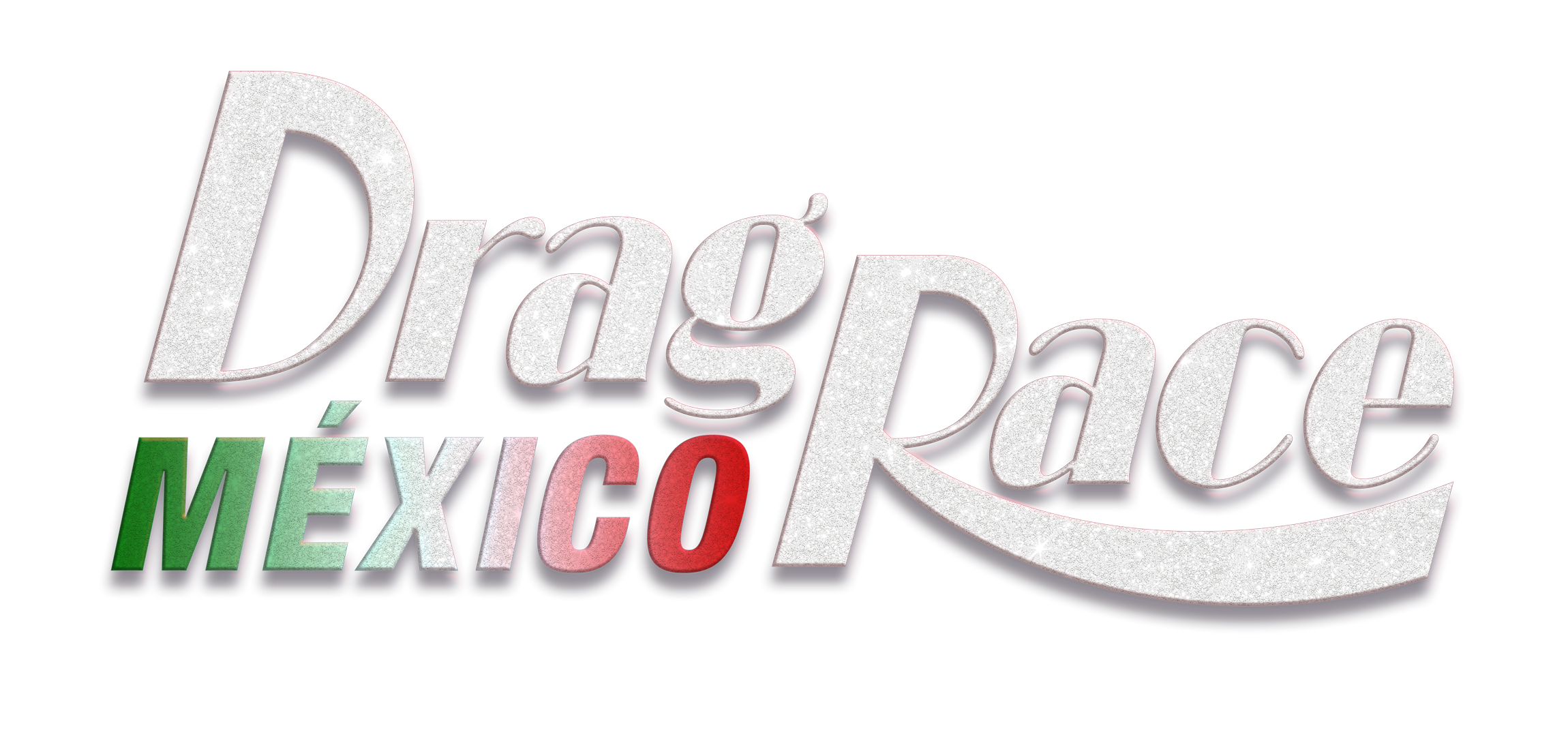
- Genre: Reality competition
- Based on: RuPaul's Drag Race
- Directed by: Germán Porras
- Presented by: Valentina (s. 1); Lolita Banana; Taiga Brava (s. 2–)
- Judges: Valentina; Lolita Banana; Oscar Madrazo; Taiga Brava
- Country of origin: Mexico
- Original language: Spanish
- No. of seasons: 2
- No. of episodes: 24 (list of episodes)

Production
- Camera setup: Multi-camera
- Running time: 45–50 minutes
- Production companies: TIS Productions; World of Wonder

Original release
- Network: MTV and Paramount+ (Mexico/Latin America); WOW Presents Plus (International)
- Release: 22 June 2023 – present

Related
- Drag Race México: Latina Royale

Drag Race México is a Mexican reality competition television series based on the original American series RuPaul's Drag Race and part of the Drag Race franchise. It airs on MTV and Paramount+ in Mexico and Latin America, and on WOW Presents Plus internationally. It is the thirteenth international adaptation of the American reality competition series RuPaul's Drag Race.

The first season premiered on 22 June 2023, and it concluded on 7 September 2023. Cristian Peralta won the first season, with Gala Varo, Matraka and Regina Voce as runners-up, while Lady Kero was named Miss Congeniality. In July 2023, the series was renewed for a second season. In September 2024, the series was renewed for a third season.

== Production ==
=== Judges ===
The competition series is hosted and judged primarily by Mexican drag queens, Lolita Banana, who competed in the first season of Drag Race France, and Taiga Brava, who won the second season of Queen of the Universe. Mexican television presenter Oscar Madrazo, made appearances as the competition's prominent judge. Valentina, who competed in the ninth season of RuPaul's Drag Race and fourth season of All Stars, co-hosted the first season alongside Lolita Banana.

Judges on Drag Race México
Judge	Season	
Judge	1	2
Valentina	Main	
Lolita Banana	Main	Main
Oscar Madrazo	Main	Main
Taiga Brava		Main

=== Contestants ===
Since 2023, there has been a total of 24 contestants featured in Drag Race México.

== Series overview ==
Season	Contestants	Episodes	Originally released			Winner	Runner(s)-up	Miss Congeniality
Season	Contestants	Episodes	First released	Last released	Network	Winner	Runner(s)-up	Miss Congeniality
1	11	12	22 June 2023	7 September 2023	Paramount+	Cristian Peralta	Gala Varo; Matraka; Regina Voce	Lady Kero
2	13	12	20 June 2024	5 September 2024	WOW Presents Plus	Leexa Fox	Eva Blunt; Horacio Potasio; Jenary Bloom	Luna Lansman; Nina de la Fuente

=== Season 1 (2023) ===
In August 2022, the production company for RuPaul's Drag Race confirmed that a Mexican adaptation is in the works with casting calls. Tomás Mier of Rolling Stone reported that Mexican-American drag queen Valentina and Mexican drag queen Lolita Banana, would host the Mexican adaptation. In May 2023, Entertainment Weekly revealed the first eleven contestants for its first season.

The first season premiered on 22 June 2023, through MTV and Paramount+ in Mexico and Latin America, and on WOW Presents Plus internationally. The contestants competed to become "Mexico's First Drag Superstar" and for a cash prize of Mex$550,000. The season ran for twelve episodes and concluded on 7 September 2023. Gala Varo, Matraka and Regina Voce were the runners-up, and Cristian Peralta was crowned the first season's winner.

=== Season 2 (2024) ===
In July 2023, it was announced that World of Wonder renewed the series for a second season. The cast for the second installment was announced on 23 May 2024, with Taiga Brava joining as a host and replacing Valentina. The season ran for twelve episodes and concluded on 5 September 2024. Eva Blunt, Horacio Potasio and Jenary Bloom were the runners-up, and Leexa Fox was crowned the second season's winner.

=== Season 3 (TBD) ===
On September 5, 2024, it was announced that World of Wonder renewed the series for a third season.

=== Spin Off ===
On October 16, 2025, it was announced that World of Wonder branded a new format called Drag Race México: Latina Royale, with involved latino queens to compete and win the crown.

== Awards and nominations ==
Name of the award ceremony, year presented, category, nominee(s) of the award, and the result of the nomination
Award	Year	Category	Recipient(s) and nominee(s)	Result	Ref.
Impulse LGBTIQ+ Awards	2023	LGBTIQ+ Entertainment Project of the Year	Drag Race México	Won	
Produ Awards	2023	Best Adapted Talent Reality Content	Drag Race México	Nominated	
Produ Awards	2023	Best LGBTQ+ Content	Drag Race México	Nominated	
Martín Fierro Awards	2023	Best Reality Show or Platform	Drag Race México	Nominated	

== Discography ==
List of soundtrack albums, with selected details
Title	Details
Dragapulco Shore: El Rusical	Released: 2 August 2023; Label: World of Wonder; Format: Digital download, streaming

List of singles
Title	Season
"Así Soy Yo"	1
"Ya No Quiero"	2
"Lonely"	2

== See also ==
- LGBTQ culture in Mexico
- List of Paramount+ original programming
- List of reality television programs with LGBT cast members
