= Gala Varo =

Mexican drag performer

- Born: Jesús Meza Arroyo; Morelia, Michoacán, Mexico
- Other name: Josué Armez
- Education: Michoacana University of San Nicolás de Hidalgo (BS); University of Guadalajara (MS, PhD)
- Occupation: Drag artist

Gala Varo is the stage name of Jesús Meza Arroyo (also known as Josué Armez), a Mexican drag performer who competed on season 1 of La Más Draga as part of Red Rabbit Duo, and on the first season of Drag Race México. Gala Varo also competed on RuPaul's Drag Race Global All Stars.

== Personal life ==
Originally from Morelia, Michoacán, Armez is based in Guadalajara, Jalisco. He has a Ph.D. in biomedicine, and was a professor at the University of Guadalajara before leaving to pursue drag full-time. Outside of drag, he also has experience as a model, dancer, and acrobat.

Armez' drag name, Gala Varo, is inspired by Gala Dalí and Remedios Varo.

== Discography ==
=== Singles ===
Year	Title	Album	Producer
2024	Amor Sin Amor	Non-album single	N/A

=== As a featured artist ===
Year	Title	Album	Producer
2023	Así Soy Yo (Versión Las Palanquetas)	Non-album single	Omar Sosa Latournerie
2024	"Everybody Say Love (Back Door Gals Europop Mix)" (The Cast of RuPaul's Drag Race Global All Stars)	Non-album single	Leland Gabe Lopez

== Filmography ==
=== Television ===
Year	Title	Role	Notes
2023	Drag Race México	Contestant (Season 1)	Runner-Up
2024	RuPaul's Drag Race Global All Stars	Contestant (Season 1)	8th place
2025	Bring Back My Girls	Guest	Season 4 Episode 5

=== Web series ===
Year	Title	Role	Notes	Ref
2019	La Más Draga	Herself	Contestant (Season 2) - 7th place	

=== Music videos ===
Year	Title	Artist	Ref
2024	GALA VARO - AMOR SIN AMOR (VIDEO OFICIAL)	Self	

== See also ==
- List of drag queens
