= Drag Race (franchise) =

International reality television drag competition format

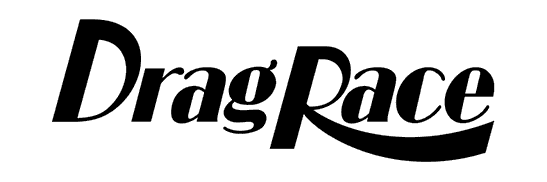
- The main logo styling; each franchise and iteration uses this alongside the local name for said franchise e.g. RuPaul's Drag Race in the UK and Canada's Drag Race in Canada etc.
- Created by: RuPaul Charles; Fenton Bailey; Randy Barbato
- Original work: RuPaul's Drag Race (United States)
- Owner: World of Wonder
- Years: 2009–present

Games
- Video game: RuPaul's Drag Race Superstar

Audio
- Original music: RuPaul's Drag Race (theme song)

Miscellaneous
- Genre: Reality competition; Drag queen
- First aired: February 2, 2009; 17 years ago

Drag Race is a drag queen reality competition television franchise, created by American drag entertainer RuPaul with production company World of Wonder. The franchise originated with RuPaul's Drag Race, which premiered in the United States in 2009. The objective of that series is to crown "America's Next Drag Superstar" who possesses the traits of "charisma, uniqueness, nerve, and talent". The original series is often credited for bringing drag into the mainstream. The popularity of the original series led to the creation of a media franchise including spin-offs and international adaptations.

As of 2026, the original series, RuPaul's Drag Race, has produced eighteen seasons and inspired the spin-off shows RuPaul's Drag U, RuPaul's Drag Race All Stars, RuPaul's Secret Celebrity Drag Race, and RuPaul's Drag Race Global All Stars; the companion series RuPaul's Drag Race: Untucked; and numerous international adaptations including British and Australian and New Zealand versions hosted by RuPaul as well as Chilean, Thai, Canadian, Dutch, Spanish, Italian, French, Filipino, Belgian, Swedish, Mexican, Brazilian, German, and South African editions and international vs. the World competitions hosted in the United Kingdom, Canada, and Down Under, All Stars in Spain, France, Canada, and the United Kingdom, Slaysian Royale in the Philippines, and Latina Royale in Mexico.

Four drag fan conventions have also been created: RuPaul's DragCon LA, RuPaul's DragCon NYC, RuPaul's DragCon UK and RuPaul's DragCon Brasil.

== History ==
=== 2008–2017: Drag Race beginnings ===
==== Premiering on Logo TV ====
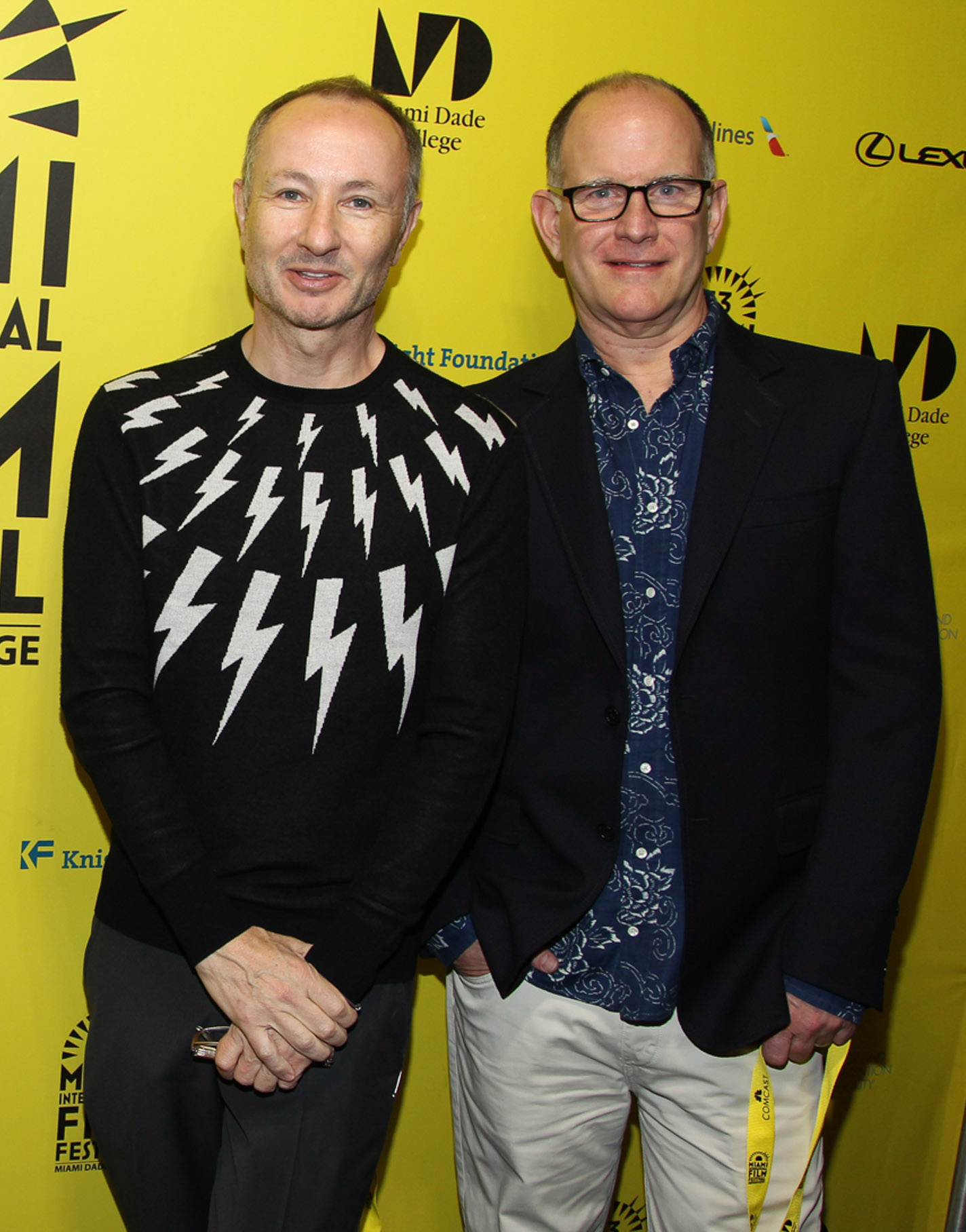
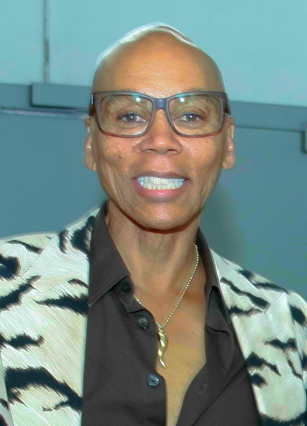
Fenton Bailey (left), Randy Barbato (middle) and RuPaul (right) are the three co-creators of the Drag Race franchise.

In mid-2008, it was revealed that RuPaul had begun producing a new reality television game show. The show was pitched to Logo and they immediately picked the show up for a season, which aired in February 2009, where it was devised as a replacement for Rick & Steve: The Happiest Gay Couple in All the World (2007–2009). In preparation for the new series, RuPaul made guest appearances on several shows in 2008, including as a guest judge on season five, episode six of Project Runway and as a guest chef on Paula's Party. RuPaul revealed that the show's intent was to find a winner possessing the traits of "charisma, uniqueness, nerve, and talent". RuPaul has stated that the show looks for an entertainer who can stand out from the rest. The series premiered on February 2, 2009. The winner of the first season of RuPaul's Drag Race and its franchise is BeBe Zahara Benet.

==== All Stars spin-off and VH1 movement ====
In March 2012, it was announced that an "all-stars" spin-off from the original show was set to premiere in late 2012 through Logo (which later moved to VH1, then onto Paramount+). It was announced as RuPaul's Drag Race All Stars, and the winner for the first season was Chad Michaels.

RuPaul's Drag Race was the first international edition of the franchise to be produced and broadcast. The program proved a success for Logo and additionally moved to a higher profile channel: VH1, for their ninth season. However, the reality show remained to air on Logo. In November 2017, World of Wonder launched their subscription streaming service WOW Presents Plus. The service provides access to its exclusive library of the Drag Race franchise, and web series from WOWPresents' YouTube channel.

=== 2018–present: International expansion of Drag Race ===
In February 2018, it was announced that a Thai adaptation of RuPaul's Drag Race was set to premiere in Thailand. The Kantana Group licensed the reality competition series. The show was named as Drag Race Thailand with its judges and co-hosts: Art Arya and Pangina Heals. The first season winner for Drag Race Thailand was Natalia Pliacam.

From 2020 to 2022, seven international adaptations of RuPaul's Drag Race were revealed and premiered. In North America, a Canadian adaptation premiered on July 2, 2020. In Europe, four adaptations premiered from the Netherlands and France. In Australia, RuPaul's Drag Race Down Under premiered on May 1, 2021, with RuPaul, Michelle Visage, and Rhys Nicholson judging.

==== BBC ====
In June 2018, the franchise producers hinted that a British adaptation of the series was in the works. It was later confirmed that creators had a meeting with the BBC and that "something is coming, be afraid – be very afraid. Nothing's impossible." A year later, the first season of RuPaul's Drag Race UK was set to premiere through BBC Three. RuPaul and Michelle Visage continued to be the main judges of the British adaptation, with Alan Carr and Graham Norton as recurring judges.

In December 2021, a press release by the BBC announced an upcoming "international all-stars" series involving the British adaptation. The first season of RuPaul's Drag Race: UK vs. the World premiered on February 1, 2022.

==== Atresmedia Televisión ====
In November 2020, a collaboration was made between production companies World of Wonder and Atresmedia, in collaboration with Buendía Estudios. In February 2021, the series was confirmed to be hosted by Supremme de Luxe. The first season of Drag Race España premiered through Atresplayer, which marks the seventh international adaptation of the American reality competition series.

In September 2022, the Spanish adaptation opened a casting call for its third season and also announced that a Spanish adaption of RuPaul's Drag Race All Stars was in the works.

==== Discovery Plus ====
In 2021, casting occurred with production starting in the summertime. The first season of Drag Race Italia premiered through Discovery+, with Priscilla as the host and head judge of the series. A second season was renewed and premiered in October 2022.

In August 2021, a casting call was made for an upcoming Philippine adaptation of the franchise. In early 2022, it announced that Paolo Ballesteros would serve as the host, alongside Jiggly Caliente and KaladKaren as permanent judges of the series. Drag Race Philippines premiered on August 17, through Discovery+. This marked the tenth international adaptation of the American reality competition series.

Both franchise adaptations no longer premiere on this streaming service.

==== MTV Entertainment Studios and Paramount Global ====
In February 2021, after three seasons of airing the "all-stars" spin-off of the United States in VH1, Paramount Global decided to move the series to Paramount+. The sixth season aired on June 24, 2021.

In August 2022, the production company behind RuPaul's Drag Race announced three casting calls on social media, taking place in Brazil, Germany, and Mexico. Many fans suspected the casting calls were for new potential Drag Race adaptations. In December, Deadline Hollywood confirmed the casting calls were for the Drag Race franchise. They also announced that World of Wonder partnered with MTV Entertainment Studios to premiere the new adaptations "on MTV/Paramount+ in their respective territories." With this partnership, they moved the American series to MTV from VH1; starting with season fifteen.

After two seasons premiering on Discovery+, the Italian adaptation was picked for a third season by Paramount Global and premiered on Paramount+. Casting calls were set up in March 2023. The third season is set to premiere on October 13, with former judge Tommaso Zorzi being replaced by Paola Iezzi and Paolo Camilli.

==== O4 Media ====
In November 2022, Entertainment Weekly reported that production companies World of Wonder and O4 Media partnered to develop more adaptations of the Drag Race franchise. The franchise will set to expand throughout the Asian continent, such as India, Japan, Singapore, and South Korea. The expansion also includes a new season of Drag Race Thailand and an Asian adaptation of RuPaul's Secret Celebrity Drag Race will be picked up from the partnership.

== Other media ==
A Las Vegas residency starring several Drag Race alumni was first announced at DragCon NYC. RuPaul's Drag Race Live! began performances on January 26, 2020, featuring a mix of original music, lip syncs, comedy, and dance numbers directed by RuPaul and choreographed by Drag Race resident choreographer Jamal Sims. The companion six-part documentary series RuPaul's Drag Race: Vegas Revue premiered on August 21, 2020.

RuPaul starred alongside numerous franchise alumni in the action comedy film Stop! That! Train!, which had a theatrical release in June 2026.

== Drag Race franchises by country ==
Legend
| † | Currently airing season |
| # | Franchise no longer in production |
| ‡ | Upcoming season announced |
| ⁂ | Status of season/franchise unknown |

| Country/Region | Name | Network | Premiere | Judges | Winner(s) |
|---|---|---|---|---|---|
| Australia New Zealand | Drag Race Down Under⁂ | Current; Stan (s. 1–); Former; TVNZ 2/TVNZ+ (s. 1-3) | May 1, 2021 | Current: Michelle Visage; Rhys Nicholson; Kita Mean (s. 4–); Spankie Jackzon (s. 4–); Isis Avis Loren (s. 4–); Former: RuPaul (s. 1–3) | Season 1, 2021: Kita Mean; Season 2, 2022: Spankie Jackzon; Season 3, 2023: Isis Avis Loren; Season 4, 2024: Lazy Susan |
| Belgium | Drag Race Belgique⁂ | Tipik | February 16, 2023 | Current: Rita Baga; Mustii; Lio (s. 2–); Former: Lufy (s. 1) | Season 1, 2023: Drag Couenne; Season 2, 2024: Alvilda |
| Brazil | Drag Race Brasil⁂ | Current; WOWPresents+ (s. 2–); Former; MTV (s. 1); Paramount+ (s. 1) | August 30, 2023 | Grag Queen; Bruna Braga; Dudu Bertholini | Season 1, 2023: Organzza; Season 2, 2025: Ruby Nox |
| Canada | Canada's Drag Race† | Crave | July 2, 2020 | Current: Brooke Lynn Hytes; Traci Melchor (s. 2–); Carson Kressley (s. 6–); Hollywood Jade (s. 6–); Sarain Fox (s. 6–); Former: Jeffrey Bowyer-Chapman (s. 1); Stacey McKenzie (s. 1); Amanda Brugel (s. 2); Brad Goreski (s. 2–5) | Season 1, 2020: Priyanka; Season 2, 2021: Icesis Couture; Season 3, 2022: Gisèle Lullaby; Season 4, 2023–2024: Venus; Season 5, 2024–2025: The Virgo Queen; Season 6, 2025–2026: Van Goth; Season 7, 2026–2027: TBA; Season 8: TBA |
| Chile | The Switch Drag Race# | Mega | October 8, 2015 | Nicole Gaultier; Íngrid Cruz; Juan Pablo González (s. 1); Sebastián Errázuriz (s. 1); Oscar Mediavilla (s. 2) | Season 1, 2015–2016: Luz Violeta; Season 2, 2018: Miss Leona |
| France | Drag Race France‡ | Current; France 2 (s. 1–); Former; France.tv Slash (s. 1–2) | June 25, 2022 | Current: Nicky Doll; Daphné Bürki; Loïc Prigent (s. 4–); Anggun (s. 4–); Former: Kiddy Smile (s. 1–3) | Season 1, 2022: Paloma; Season 2, 2023: Keiona; Season 3, 2024: Le Filip; Season 4, 2026: Lana Cotta; Season 5: TBA |
| Germany Austria Switzerland | Drag Race Germany⁂ | MTV; Paramount+ | September 5, 2023 | Barbie Breakout; Gianni Jovanovic; Dianne Brill | Season 1, 2023: Pandora Nox |
| Italy | Drag Race Italia⁂ | Current; MTV (s. 3–); Paramount+ (s. 3–); Former; Discovery+ (s. 1–2); Real Time (s. 1–2) | November 18, 2021 | Current: Priscilla; Chiara Francini; Paola Iezzi (s. 3–); Paolo Camilli (s. 3–); Former: Tommaso Zorzi (s. 1–2) | Season 1, 2021: Elecktra Bionic; Season 2, 2022: La Diamond; Season 3, 2023: Lina Galore |
| Mexico | Drag Race México‡ | Current; WOWPresents+ (s. 2–); Former; MTV (s. 1); Paramount+ (s. 1) | June 22, 2023 | Current: Lolita Banana; Óscar Madrazo; Taiga Brava (s. 2–); Former: Valentina (s. 1) | Season 1, 2023: Cristian Peralta; Season 2, 2024: Leexa Fox; Season 3: TBA |
| Netherlands | Drag Race Holland⁂ | Videoland | September 18, 2020 | Fred van Leer; Nikkie Plessen (s. 1); Marieke Samallo (s. 2) | Season 1, 2020: Envy Peru; Season 2, 2021: Vanessa Van Cartier |
| Philippines | Drag Race Philippines† | Current; WOWPresents+ (s. 4–); Former; HBO Go (s. 1–3); Discovery+ (s. 1) | August 17, 2022 | Current: Paolo Ballesteros; KaladKaren; BJ Pascual; Jon Santos; Rajo Laurel; Former: Jiggly Caliente (s. 1-3) | Season 1, 2022: Precious Paula Nicole; Season 2, 2023: Captivating Katkat; Season 3, 2024: Maxie; Season 4, 2026: TBA |
| South Africa | Drag Race South Africa‡ | TBA | TBA | TBA | Season 1: TBA |
| Spain | Drag Race España† | Atresplayer Premium | May 30, 2021 | Supremme de Luxe; Ana Locking; Javier Ambrossi; Javier Calvo | Season 1, 2021: Carmen Farala; Season 2, 2022: Sharonne; Season 3, 2023: Pitita; Season 4, 2024: Le Cocó; Season 5, 2025: Satín Greco; Season 6, 2026: TBA |
| Sweden | Drag Race Sverige⁂ | SVT1; SVT Play | March 4, 2023 | Robert Fux; Kayo; Farao Groth | Season 1, 2023: Admira Thunderpussy |
| Thailand | Drag Race Thailand⁂ | Current; WOWPresents+ (s. 3–); Former; Line TV (s. 1–2) | February 15, 2018 | Pangina Heals; Art Arya; Gus Setthachai (s. 3–); Metinee Kingpayome (s. 3–); Niti Chaichitathorn (s. 3–) | Season 1, 2018: Natalia Pliacam; Season 2, 2019: Angele Anang; Season 3, 2024: Frankie Wonga |
| United Kingdom | RuPaul's Drag Race UK⁂ | Former; BBC Three (s. 1–3); BBC One (s. 1–3); BBC Three (s. 4–8) | October 3, 2019 | RuPaul; Michelle Visage; Alan Carr; Graham Norton | Series 1, 2019: The Vivienne; Series 2, 2021: Lawrence Chaney; Series 3, 2021: Krystal Versace; Series 4, 2022: Danny Beard; Series 5, 2023: Ginger Johnson; Series 6, 2024: Kyran Thrax; Series 7, 2025: Bones; Series 8, 2026: Flesh |
| United States | RuPaul's Drag Race‡ | Current; MTV (s. 15–); Former; Logo TV (s. 1–8); VH1 (s. 9–14) | February 2, 2009 | Current: RuPaul; Michelle Visage (s. 3–); Carson Kressley (s. 7–); Ross Mathews (s. 7–); Ts Madison (s. 15–); Law Roach (s. 17–); Former: Merle Ginsberg (s. 1–2); Santino Rice (s. 1–6); Billy B (s. 3–4) | Season 1, 2009: BeBe Zahara Benet; Season 2, 2010: Tyra Sanchez; Season 3, 2011: Raja; Season 4, 2012: Sharon Needles; Season 5, 2013: Jinkx Monsoon; Season 6, 2014: Bianca Del Rio; Season 7, 2015: Violet Chachki; Season 8, 2016: Bob the Drag Queen; Season 9, 2017: Sasha Velour; Season 10, 2018: Aquaria; Season 11, 2019: Yvie Oddly; Season 12, 2020: Jaida Essence Hall; Season 13, 2021: Symone; Season 14, 2022: Willow Pill; Season 15, 2023: Sasha Colby; Season 16, 2024: Nymphia Wind; Season 17, 2025: Onya Nurve; Season 18, 2026: Myki Meeks; Season 19: TBA; Season 20: TBA |

== Spin-off series ==
=== Competitive ===
A total of 5 countries have adopted their own “All Stars" spin-off competitions feature former contestants: RuPaul's Drag Race All Stars premiered in 2012, Drag Race España All Stars premiered in 2024, Drag Race France All Stars premiered in 2025 and RuPaul’s Drag Race UK All Stars was announced in 2026.

International spin-off competitions include RuPaul's Drag Race: UK vs. the World and Canada's Drag Race: Canada vs. the World, which debuted in February and November 2022, respectively. Drag Race Philippines: Slaysian Royale debuted in August 2025, with Drag Race Down Under vs. the World and Drag Race México: Latina Royale having both premiered in 2026.

RuPaul's Drag U premiered in 2010 and saw drag "professors" give makeovers to "student" members of the public. RuPaul's Secret Celebrity Drag Race debuted in 2020 and features celebrities.

Legend
| † | Currently airing season |
| # | Season no longer in production |
| ‡ | Upcoming season announced |
| ⁂ | Status of season/franchise unknown |

| Country/Region | Name | Network | Premiere | Judges | Winner(s) |
|---|---|---|---|---|---|
| Global | RuPaul's Drag Race Global All Stars⁂ | Paramount+ | August 16, 2024 | RuPaul; Michelle Visage; Jamal Sims | Season 1, 2024: Alyssa Edwards |
| Australia New Zealand | Drag Race Down Under vs. the World⁂ | Stan | July 24, 2026 | Michelle Visage; Rhys Nicholson; Lazy Susan | Season 1, 2026: Michael Marouli |
| Canada | Canada's Drag Race: Canada vs. the World⁂ | Crave | November 18, 2022 | Brooke Lynn Hytes; Brad Goreski; Traci Melchor | Season 1, 2022: Ra'Jah O'Hara; Season 2, 2024: Lemon |
| Canada | Canada's Drag Race All Stars⁂ | Crave | July 9, 2026 | Brooke Lynn Hytes; Priyanka; Jimbo | Season 1, 2026: Aurora Matrix |
| France | Drag Race France All Stars⁂ | France 2 | July 10, 2025 | Nicky Doll; Daphné Bürki; Loïc Prigent; Shy'm | Season 1, 2025: Mami Watta |
| Mexico | Drag Race México: Latina Royale⁂ | WOWPresents+ | July 30, 2026 | Lolita Banana; Taiga Brava | Season 1, 2026: Elektra Vandergeld |
| Philippines | Drag Race Philippines: Slaysian Royale⁂ | WOWPresents+ | August 13, 2025 | Paolo Ballesteros | Season 1, 2025: Brigiding |
| Spain | Drag Race España All Stars‡ | Atresplayer | February 4, 2024 | Supremme de Luxe; Ana Locking; Javier Ambrossi; Javier Calvo | Season 1, 2024: Drag Sethlas; Season 2: TBA |
| United Kingdom | RuPaul's Drag Race: UK vs. the World⁂ | BBC Three | February 1, 2022 | RuPaul; Michelle Visage; Alan Carr; Graham Norton | Series 1, 2022: Blu Hydrangea; Series 2, 2024: Tia Kofi; Series 3, 2026: Gawdland |
| United Kingdom | RuPaul's Drag Race UK: All Stars‡ | WOWPresents+ | TBA | TBA | Series 1, 2027: TBA |
| United States | RuPaul's Drag U# | Logo TV | July 19, 2010 | Lady Bunny; Frank Gatson Jr. (s. 1) | Season 1, 2010: Various; Season 2, 2011: Various; Season 3, 2012: Various |
| United States | RuPaul's Drag Race All Stars‡ | Current; Paramount+ (s. 6–); Former; Logo TV (s. 1–2); VH1 (s. 3–5) | October 22, 2012 | Current: RuPaul; Michelle Visage; Carson Kressley (s. 2–); Ross Mathews (s. 3–); Ts Madison (s. 8–); Law Roach (s. 10–); Former: Santino Rice (s. 1); Todrick Hall (s. 2) | Season 1, 2012: Chad Michaels; Season 2, 2016: Alaska; Season 3, 2018: Trixie Mattel; Season 4, 2018–2019: Monét X Change & Trinity the Tuck; Season 5, 2020: Shea Couleé; Season 6, 2021: Kylie Sonique Love; Season 7, 2022: Jinkx Monsoon; Season 8, 2023: Jimbo; Season 9, 2024: Angeria Paris VanMicheals; Season 10, 2025: Ginger Minj; Season 11, 2026: Crystal Methyd; Season 12: TBA |
| United States | RuPaul's Secret Celebrity Drag Race‡ | VH1 | April 24, 2020 | RuPaul; Michelle Visage; Carson Kressley; Ross Mathews | Season 1, 2020: Jordan Connor, Vanessa Williams, Matt Iseman, Alex Newell, Dustin Milligan, Hayley Kiyoko; Season 2, 2022: AJ McLean; Season 3: TBA |

=== Non-competitive ===
| Country/Region | Name | Network | Premiere | Format |
|---|---|---|---|---|
| Canada | Slaycation⁂ | Crave | December 31, 2024 | Reality television |
| Philippines | Drag Race Philippines: Untucked!# | HBO Go (s. 1–3); Discovery+ (s. 1) | August 19, 2022 | Behind the scenes / companion show |
| Sweden | Drag Race Sverige: Untucked!⁂ | SVT | March 4, 2023 | Behind the scenes / companion show |
| United Kingdom | God Shave the Queens# | BBC Three | September 10, 2020 | Behind the scenes on tour show |
| United States | RuPaul's Drag Race: Untucked!‡ | Current; MTV (s. 14–); Former; Logo TV (s. 1–5); YouTube (s. 6–8); VH1 (s. 9–13) | February 1, 2010 | Behind the scenes / companion show |
| United States | RuPaul's Drag Race All Stars: Untucked!‡ | Current; Paramount+ (s. 3–); Former; Logo TV (s. 1); VH1 (s. 2) | October 22, 2012 | Behind the scenes / companion show |
| United States | Werq the World# | WOWPresents+ | June 7, 2019 | Behind the scenes on tour show |
| United States | RuPaul's Drag Race: Vegas Revue# | VH1 | August 21, 2020 | Behind the scenes show |
| United States | Bring Back My Girls⁂ | WOWPresents+ | October 18, 2022 | Reunion show |
| United States | RuPaul's Drag Race Live Untucked⁂ | WOWPresents+ | April 17, 2024 | Behind the scenes / companion show |

== One-off specials ==
| Country/Region | Name | Network | Premiere | Judges | Winner(s) |
|---|---|---|---|---|---|
| Canada | Canada's Drag Race Anniversary Extravaganza | Crave | September 6, 2021 | —N/a | Non-competitive |
| United States | RuPaul's Drag Race: Green Screen Christmas | Logo TV | December 13, 2015 | —N/a | Non-competitive |
| United States | RuPaul's Drag Race Holi-slay Spectacular | VH1 | December 7, 2018 | RuPaul; Michelle Visage; Ross Mathews; Todrick Hall | All participants (Note: On RuPaul's Drag Race Holi-slay Spectacular, all participants (Eureka O'Hara, Jasmine Masters, Kim Chi, Latrice Royale, Mayhem Miller, Shangela, Sonique, and Trixie Mattel) were declared winners.) |
| United States | Bring Back My Ghouls | WOWPresents+ YouTube | October 30, 2020 | —N/a | Non-competitive |
| United States | RuPaul's Drag Race: Corona Can't Keep a Good Queen Down | VH1 | February 26, 2021 | —N/a | Non-competitive |
