= List of Drag Race France episodes =

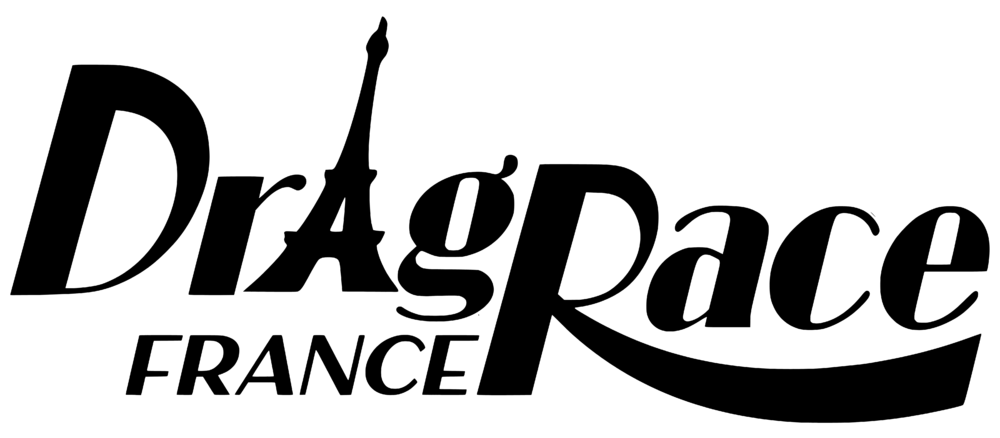
Logo for Drag Race France

Drag Race France is a French reality television series based on the American television series RuPaul's Drag Race. The first season of the series premiered on 25 June 2022 on France.tv Slash. The second and the third seasons followed in 2023 and 2024 respectively.

== Series overview ==
Season	Contestants	Episodes	Originally released		
Season	Contestants	Episodes	First released	Last released	Network
1	10	8	25 June 2022	11 August 2022	France.tv Slash
2	11	9	30 June 2023	25 August 2023	France.tv Slash
3	10	8	31 May 2024	19 July 2024	France 2
4	10	8	8 July 2026	26 August 2026	France 2

== Episodes ==
=== Season 1 (2022) ===
The first season premiered on 25 June 2022. The cast was announced on June 2, 2022. Paloma was crowned the winner of the season, with La Grande Dame and Soa de Muse as runners-up.

No. overall	No. in season	Title	Original release date
1	1	"Bonjour, Bonjour, Bonjour!"	25 June 2022
2	2	"Queen Pour Cent"	30 June 2022
3	3	"The French Ball"	7 July 2022
4	4	"Snatch Game"	14 July 2022
5	5	"Popstars"	21 July 2022
6	6	"Un Parfum de Drag"	28 July 2022
7	7	"Sororité"	4 August 2022
8	8	"Grande Finale"	11 August 2022

=== Season 2 (2023) ===
The second season debuted on 30 June 2023. The winner of the second season was Keiona, with Sara Forever as the runner-up.

No. overall	No. in season	Title	Original release date
9	1	"A Lé-Gen-Daire Return" "Un retour LÉ-GEN-DAIRE"	30 June 2023
10	2	"It’s Show Night" "C’est show ce soir"	7 July 2023
11	3	"Motor, Dragtion!" "Moteur, dragtion !"	14 July 2023
12	4	"Snatch Game - France Season 2" "Le Snatch Game"	21 July 2023
13	5	"The Musidrag" "Le Bossu de Notre Drag"	28 July 2023
14	6	"Time Ball" "Time Ball"	4 August 2023
15	7	"Showtime!" "Showtime !"	11 August 2023
16	8	"Queen Twice Over" "Plutôt deux fois queen"	18 August 2023
17	9	"Grand Finale" "La Grande Finale"	25 August 2023

=== Season 3 (2024) ===
The third season premiered on 31 May 2024. For this season, the series was moved to France 2 in France. Ten contestants were announced on 24 April 2024. The winner of the third season was Le Filip, with Ruby on the Nail as the runner-up.

No. overall	No. in season	Title	Original release date
18	1	"Voulez-Vous Drag Race Avec Moi Ce Soir?"	31 May 2024
19	2	"Talent Show Extravaganza"	7 June 2024
20	3	"Ball Games"	14 June 2024
21	4	"Céline Dion: The Rusical"	21 June 2024
22	5	"Snatch Game"	28 June 2024
23	6	"Makeover, Ma Grande Sœur Drag"	5 July 2024
24	7	"La Folle Journée Drag"	12 July 2024
25	8	"Grand Finale"	19 July 2024

=== Season 4 (2026) ===
The fourth season premiered on 8 July 2026. Ten contestants were announced on 15 June 2026.

No. overall	No. in season	Title	Original release date
26	1	"Drag Academy"	8 July 2026
