= Drag Race France All Stars =

French reality television series

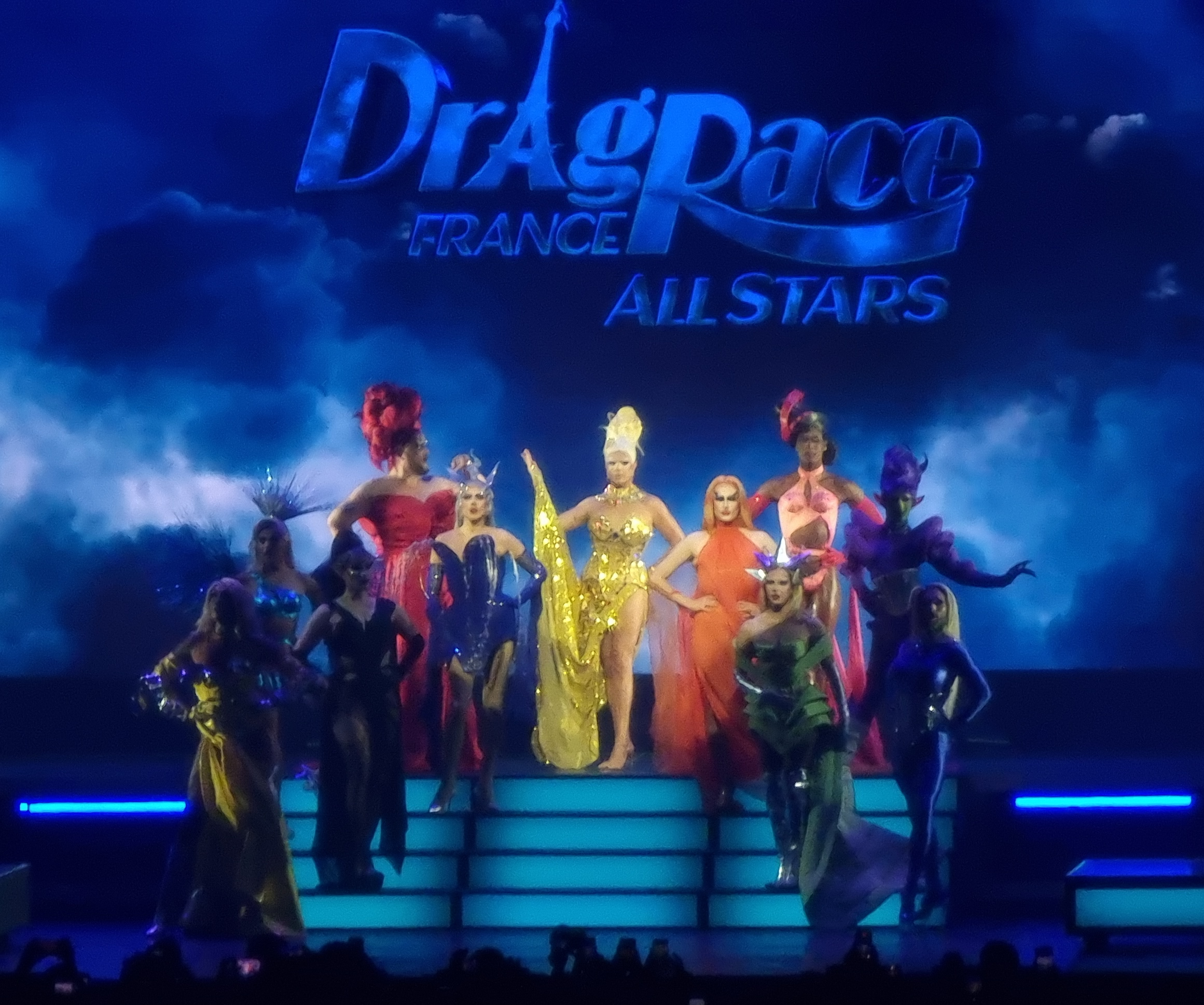
- Drag Race France All Stars contestants at Accor Arena
- Genre: Reality competition
- Based on: RuPaul's Drag Race All Stars
- Presented by: Nicky Doll
- Judges: Nicky Doll; Daphné Bürki; Loïc Prigent; Shy'm
- Opening theme: "RuPaul's Drag Race" (theme)
- Ending theme: "Main event"
- Country of origin: France
- Original language: French
- No. of seasons: 1
- No. of episodes: 8

Production
- Executive producers: Fenton Bailey; Randy Barbato; Tom Campbell; RuPaul Charles
- Camera setup: Multi-camera
- Production companies: Endemol France; Shake Shake Shake; World of Wonder

Original release
- Network: France 2 (France) (Note: France 2 is the main network for the show, however, episodes are released on the France.tv streaming service a few hour before airing on the channel, except for the season finale.); Crave (Canada); WOW Presents Plus (International)
- Release: 10 July 2025 – present

Related
- Drag Race franchise; Drag Race France

Drag Race France All Stars is a French reality competition television show part of the Drag Race franchise. A spin off edition of Drag Race France, it is based on the original American spin-off series RuPaul's Drag Race All Stars. It is the second international adaptation of the All Stars format, after the Spanish iteration. Like the main series, the show is hosted by Nicky Doll.

The show premiered on 10 July 2025 on France 2. It is available simultaneously on Crave in Canada, and on WOW Presents Plus internationally.

== Production ==
National television broadcaster France Télévisions first announced an All Stars spin-off series of Drag Race France was in development on 21 November 2024. Nicky Doll was confirmed to host and head judge as she appeared in a promotional poster as the Mona Lisa. This series will be the second adaptation in the All Stars franchise, and the first French-language series. It is co-produced by Endemol France, Shake Shake Shake, and World of Wonder. Fenton Bailey, Randy Barbato, Tom Campbell and RuPaul Charles serves as executive producers.

The ten contestants for the first season were officially announced on 11 June 2025. The series premiered on 10 July 2025 on France 2 in France and on WOW Presents Plus internationally. The season is dubbed into twelve languages, including English.

== Contestants ==
Ages, names, and cities stated are at time of filming.

Contestants of Drag Race France All Stars and their backgrounds
Contestant	Age	Hometown	Original season(s)	Original placement(s)	Outcome
Mami Watta	26	Saint-Denis, Île-de-France	Season 2	3rd place	Winner
Elips	28	Bordeaux, Nouvelle-Aquitaine	Season 1	6th place (Note: Elips was voted Miss Congeniality on her original season.)	Runner-up
Misty Phoenix	24	Paris, Île-de-France	Season 3	5th place	3rd place
Piche	28	Paris, Île-de-France	Season 2	5th place	3rd place
Moon	33	Geneva, Switzerland	Season 2	7th place (Note: Moon was voted Miss Congeniality on her original season.)	5th place
Kam Hugh	26	Paris, Île-de-France	Season 1	7th place	6th place
La Big Bertha	40	Paris, Île-de-France	Season 1	5th place	7th place
Punani (Note: Punani Jellinsky is referred to as Punani on the show.)	34	Paris, Île-de-France	Season 2	3rd place	8th place
Soa de Muse	36	Saint-Denis, Île-de-France	Season 1	Runner-up	9th place
Soa de Muse	36	Saint-Denis, Île-de-France	Global All Stars 1	9th place (Note: Soa de Muse was voted Global Peacemaker on Global All Stars.)	9th place
Magnetica	25	Paris, Île-de-France	Season 3	9th place	10th place

== Contestant progress ==
Legend:

Mami Watta won Drag Race France All Stars season 1.
Elips was the runner-up.
Kam Hugh was voted Miss Congeniality (Miss C).
WIN indicates that the contestant won the challenge and the Lip Sync for Your Legacy.
TOP2 indicates that the contestant won the challenge, but lost the Lip Sync for Your Legacy.
SAFE indicates that the contestant was declared safe by the judges.
BTM (Bottom) indicates that the contestant was up for elimination.
ELIM (Eliminated) indicates that the contestant was eliminated.
OUT indicates that the contestant returned to win re-entry into the competition, but lost.
Guest indicates that the contestant returned as a guest.

Contestants progress with placements in each episode
Contestant	Episode							
Contestant	1	2	3	4	5	6 (Note: On episode 6, the two Top All Stars were asked to save one of the bottom queens, or choose an eliminated queen to return to the competition.)	7	8
Mami Watta	WIN	SAFE	SAFE	WIN	SAFE	SAFE	WIN	Winner
Elips	SAFE	WIN	SAFE	SAFE	WIN	TOP2	SAFE	Runner-up
Misty Phoenix	TOP2	SAFE	WIN	SAFE	SAFE	BTM	TOP2	Eliminated
Piche	SAFE	SAFE	SAFE	TOP2	SAFE	WIN	BTM	Eliminated
Moon	SAFE	SAFE	SAFE	SAFE	BTM	SAFE	ELIM	Guest
Kam Hugh	SAFE	TOP2	BTM	BTM	TOP2	ELIM		Miss C
La Big Bertha	BTM	SAFE	SAFE	SAFE	ELIM	OUT		Guest
Punani	SAFE	SAFE	TOP2	ELIM		OUT		Guest
Soa de Muse	SAFE	BTM	ELIM			OUT		Guest
Magnetica	BTM	ELIM				OUT		Guest

== Lip syncs ==
Legend:

The contestant was eliminated after their first time in the bottom.
The contestant was eliminated after their second time in the bottom.
The contestant was eliminated after their third time in the bottom.
The contestant won the first round of the Lip Sync Smackdown for the Crown.
The contestant won the second round of the Lip Sync Smackdown for the Crown and was declared the winner of the season.

Episode	Top All Stars (Elimination)			Song	Winner	Bottom	Eliminated
1	Mami Watta (Bertha)	vs.	Misty Phoenix (Magnetica)	"I'm Good (Blue)" (David Guetta, Bebe Rexha)	Mami Watta	La Big Bertha, Magnetica	None (Note: Mami Watta chose to eliminate La Big Bertha, however, Nicky Doll chose to have no one be eliminated.)
2	Elips (Magnetica)	vs.	Kam Hugh (Magnetica)	"Non, je ne regrette rien" (Édith Piaf)	Elips	Magnetica, Soa	Magnetica
3	Misty Phoenix (Soa)	vs.	Punani (Soa)	"Discoteca" (Ascendant Vierge, Nadsat)	Misty Phoenix	Kam, Soa	Soa de Muse
4	Mami Watta (Punani)	vs.	Piche (Kam)	"A cause des garçons" (Yelle)	Mami Watta	Kam, Punani	Punani
5	Elips (Bertha)	vs.	Kam Hugh (Bertha)	"Boys (Summertime Love)" (Sabrina)	Elips	La Big Bertha, Moon	La Big Bertha
Episode	Top All Stars (Saved)			Song	Winner	Bottom	Eliminated
6	Elips (Kam) (Note: On episode 6, the two Top All Stars were asked to choose either to save one of the bottom queens or choose an eliminated queen to return to the competition.)	vs.	Piche (Misty)	"I Had a Dream" (Nicky Doll)	Piche	Kam, Misty	Kam Hugh
Episode	Top All Stars (Elimination)			Song	Winner	Bottom	Eliminated
7	Mami Watta (Moon)	vs.	Misty Phoenix (Moon) (Note: During the semi-final broadcast, production did not reveal which contestant Misty Phoenix intended to eliminate. On August 31, 2025, Phoenix later stated in a TikTok video (now set to private), that she had chosen Moon, thereby confirming the vote she would have cast had it been disclosed during the episode.)	"Recommence-moi" (Santa)	Mami Watta	Moon, Piche	Moon
Episode	Final All Stars			Song	Winner		
8	Elips	vs.	Piche	"Born to Be Alive" (Patrick Hernandez)	Elips		
8	Mami Watta	vs.	Misty Phoenix	"Kongolese sous BBL" (Theodora, Jeez Suave)	Mami Watta		
8	Elips	vs.	Mami Watta	"Abracadabra" (Lady Gaga)	Mami Watta		

== Guest judges ==
Listed in chronological order:

- Thomas Jolly, actor and artistic director
- Marion Cotillard, actress
- Camille Razat, actress and model
- Noam Sinseau, comedian
- Yelle, singer and songwriter
- Judith Godrèche, actress and activist
- Mehdi Kerkouche, choreographer
- Marcus, internet personality
- Santa, singer and songwriter

=== Special guests ===
Guests who appeared in episodes, but did not judge on the main stage.

Episode 1

- Le Filip, winner of Drag Race France season 3

Episode 2

- Paloma, winner of Drag Race France season 1

Episode 4

- Sutus, music producer

Episode 5

- Claudia Tagbo, actress, comedian, and television personality
- Marilou Berry, actress, director, and screenwriter
- Alex Ramirès, comedian and actor
- Natoo, internet personality and actress
- Theodora, singer and songwriter
- Bruno Sanches, actor
- Rebeka Warrior, musical artist and composer

Episode 7

- Lova Ladiva, contestant on Drag Race France season 1

Episode 8

- Alyssa Hunter, contestant on RuPaul's Drag Race season 14 and RuPaul's Drag Race All Stars season 10
- Paloma, winner of Drag Race France season 1
- Natoo, internet personality and actress
- Alex Ramirès, comedian and actor
- Marilou Berry, actress, director, and screenwriter
- Rebeka Warrior, musical artist and composer
- Claudia Tagbo, actress, comedian, and television personality
- Theodora, singer and songwriter
- Lady Gaga, singer and actress

== Episodes ==
No.	Title	Original release date
1	"Abracada-Drag"	10 July 2025
Guest Judge: Thomas Jolly; Mini-Challenge: Reading is Fundamental; Mini-Challenge Winner: Magnetica; Main Challenge: Perform in a talent show; Runway Theme: L'or j'adore (I Love Gold); Top Two: Mami Watta and Misty Phoenix; Lip-Sync Song: "I'm Good (Blue)" by David Guetta & Bebe Rexha; Lip-Sync for Your Legacy Winner: Mami Watta; Bottom Two: La Big Bertha and Magnetica; Eliminated: None
2	"Super Ball"	17 July 2025
Guest Judge: Marion Cotillard; Mini-Challenge: Attempt to knock Paloma off a balance beam; Mini-Challenge Winner: Punani; Main Challenge: The Super Ball; Runway Themes: XX Ailes (Extra Large Wings), Métro, boulot, let's go (Metro, Work, Let's Go), and Maison de couture (Fashion House); Top Two: Elips and Kam Hugh; Lip-Sync Song: "Non, je ne regrette rien" by Édith Piaf; Lip-Sync for Your Legacy Winner: Elips; Bottom Two: Magnetica and Soa de Muse; Eliminated: Magnetica; Farwell Message: "Cette étoile ne s'éteindra jamais ! Love, Magnetica ♡" ("This star will never fade away! Love, Magnetica ♡")
3	"Golden Snatch Game"	24 July 2025
Guest Judges: Camille Razat and Noam Sinseau; Main Challenge: Snatch Game; Runway Theme: T'es gonflé (You're Inflated); Top Two: Misty Phoenix and Punani; Lip-Sync Song: "Discoteca" by Ascendant Vierge, Nadsat; Lip-Sync for Your Legacy Winner: Misty Phoenix; Bottom Two: Kam Hugh and Soa de Muse; Eliminated: Soa de Muse; Farwell Message: "ALL STARS 4 EVER 💋"
4	"Superstars"	31 July 2025
Guest Judge: Yelle; Mini-Challenge: Vote in superlatives; Mini-Challenge Winner: Moon; Main Challenge: Write, record, and perform verses to "On s'envoie en l'air"; Runway Theme: J'ai rien fait! (I Didn't Get Anything Done!); Top Two: Mami Watta and Piche; Lip-Sync Song: "A cause des garçons" by Yelle; Lip-Sync for Your Legacy Winner: Mami Watta; Bottom Two: Kam Hugh and Punani; Eliminated: Punani; Farwell Message: "Une saison Punaniconique ♡ PS: Mami, je sais où tu habites" ("One Punan-iconic season ♡ PS: Mami, I know where you live")
5	"Makeover VIP"	7 August 2025
Main Challenge: Makeover celebrities; Runway Theme: Famille de stars (Family of Stars); Top Two: Elips and Kam Hugh; Lip-Sync Song: "Boys (Summertime Love)" by Sabrina; Lip-Sync for Your Legacy Winner: Elips; Bottom Two: La Big Bertha and Moon; Eliminated: La Big Bertha; Farwell Message: "🖐🖐 BON COURAGE 🖐 ELIPS♡ BB 🖐🖐" ("🖐🖐 GOOD LUCK 🖐 ELIPS♡ BB 🖐🖐")
6	"Queenovision"	14 August 2025
Guest Judges: Judith Godrèche and Mehdi Kerkouche; Mini-Challenge: In pairs, play charades using French proverbs and expressions; Mini-Challenge Winners: Elips and Piche; Main Challenge: In pairs, perform choreography for "Queenovision"; Runway Theme: Circus Couture; Top Two: Elips and Piche; Lip-Sync Song: "I Had a Dream" by Nicky Doll; Lip-Sync for Your Legacy Winner: Piche; Bottom Two: Kam Hugh and Misty Phoenix; Eliminated: Kam Hugh; Farwell Message: "⭐💗🎀 Enchantée. ⭐ Je Vous Aime Trop, ⭐ Tops, Déchirez Tout. Love Kam 💗" ("⭐💗🎀 Nice to meet you. ⭐ I Love You So Much, ⭐ Tops, Rock It. Love Kam 💗")
7	"The Nicky d'Or"	21 August 2025
Guest Judges: Santa and Marcus; Mini-Challenge: Le Talon Faible (The Weakest Heel); Mini-Challenge Winners: Moon; Main Challenge: Write and deliver a roast during the Nicky d'Or ceremony; Runway Theme: Viva la reine (Long Live the Queen); Top Two: Mami Watta and Misty Phoenix; Lip-Sync Song: "Recommence-moi" by Santa; Lip-Sync for Your Legacy Winner: Mami Watta; Bottom Two: Moon and Piche; Eliminated: Moon; Farwell Message: "Vive les différences. Vive les queers. Vive les trans. ♡" ("Long live differences. Long live queers. Long live trans people. ♡")
8	"The Finale"	28 August 2025
Finals venue: Grand Rex, Paris, France; Final Four: Elips, Mami Watta, Misty Phoenix and Piche; Runway Theme: Dragnifique (Dragnificent); Miss Congeniality: Kam Hugh; Lip-Sync Smackdown #1: Elips vs. Piche; Lip-Sync Song: "Born to Be Alive" by Patrick Hernandez; Eliminated: Piche; Lip-Sync Smackdown #2: Mami Watta vs. Misty Phoenix; Lip-Sync Song: "Kongolese sous BBL" by Théodora; Eliminated: Misty Phoenix; Lip-Sync Smackdown #3: Elips vs. Mami Watta; Lip-Sync Song: "Abracadabra" by Lady Gaga; Runner-up: Elips; Winner of Drag Race France All Stars Season One: Mami Watta

== Tour ==
To promote the series, an upcoming tour titled The Royal Tour was announced throughout social media on 11 December 2024. This tour is set to feature the competitors who appeared on the series; it will embark on 10 September 2025, at concert hall the Salle Pleyel in Paris.
