= Drag Race France season 4 =

Fourth season of Drag Race France

Drag Race France
- Season 4
- Promotional poster for season four
- Hosted by: Nicky Doll
- Judges: Nicky Doll; Daphné Bürki; Loïc Prigent; Anggun
- No. of contestants: 10
- Winner: Lana Cotta
- Runner-up: Daisy Superbitch
- Miss Congeniality: Margarette
- No. of episodes: 8

Release
- Original network: France.tv Slash (France); WOW Presents Plus (International)
- Original release: 8 July – 27 August 2026

Season chronology
- ← Previous; Season 3

The fourth season of Drag Race France premiered on July 8, 2026. The season aired on France 2 in France and WOW Presents Plus internationally. The season was confirmed by World of Wonder on 14 October 2025.

== Production ==
On 14 October 2025, it was announced via the shows official Instagram page, that casting for the fourth season was now open. Applications remained open for four weeks until closing on 6 November 2025.

Ten contestants were announced on 24 April 2024. Participants include Malawitte, the Drag Race franchise's fifth cisgender female contestant. On the same day it was announced that Nicky Doll and Daphné Bürki would recur in their roles again during the season, while Loïc Prigent (who was already on the judging panel during the All Stars installment) and Anggun are joining the judging panel to take the place of Kiddy Smile.

== Contestants ==
Ages, names, and cities stated are at time of filming.

Contestants of Drag Race France season 4 and their backgrounds
Contestant	Age	Hometown	Outcome
Lana Cotta	22	Marseille, Provence-Alpes-Côte d'Azur	Winner
Daisy Superbitch	33	Brussels, Belgium	Runner-up
Azemylia	27	Paris, Île-de-France	3rd place
Sublyme	31	Paris, Île-de-France	3rd place
La Harpie	27	Lille, Hauts-de-France	5th place
Fluffy Bidule	27	Bordeaux, Nouvelle-Aquitaine	6th place
Holly White	40	Cannes, Provence-Alpes-Côte d'Azur	7th place
Margarette (Note: Margarette Vinas is referred to as Margarette on the show.)	26	Paris, Île-de-France	8th place (Note: Margarette was voted Miss Congeniality by fellow contestants.)
Malawitte	26	Paris, Île-de-France	9th place
Creatine Price	35	Paris, Île-de-France	10th place

== Contestant progress ==
Legend:

Lana Cotta won Drag Race France season 4.
Daisy Superbitch was the runner-up.
Margarette was voted Miss Congeniality (Miss C).
TOP2 indicates that the contestant was one of the two best performing in the challenge, but lost the lip sync to win it.
WIN indicates that the contestant won the challenge.
SAFE indicates that the contestant was declared safe by the judges.
BGT (Baguette) indicates that the contestant received the Golden Baguette and was saved from the bottom two.
BTM (Bottom) indicates that the contestant was up for elimination.
ELIM (Eliminated) indicates that the contestant was eliminated.
Guest indicates that the contestant returned as a guest.

Contestants progress with placements in each episode
Contestant	Episode							
Contestant	1	2	3	4	5	6	7	8
Lana Cotta	SAFE	SAFE	BTM	WIN	BGT	BGT	WIN	Winner
Daisy Superbitch	SAFE	WIN	SAFE	SAFE	WIN	BTM	SAFE	Runner-up
Azemylia	WIN	SAFE	SAFE	BTM	WIN	SAFE	BTM	Eliminated
Sublyme	SAFE	SAFE	SAFE	SAFE	WIN	BTM	SAFE	Eliminated
La Harpie	SAFE	BGT	SAFE	SAFE	BTM	WIN	ELIM	Guest
Fluffy Bidule	SAFE	SAFE	WIN	BGT	ELIM			Guest
Holly White	SAFE	BTM	BGT	ELIM				Guest
Margarette	BTM	SAFE	ELIM					Miss C
Malawitte	SAFE	ELIM						Guest
Creatine Price	ELIM							Guest

== Lip syncs ==
Legend:

The contestant was eliminated after their first time in the bottom.
The contestant was eliminated after their second time in the bottom.
The contestant won the Lip Sync for the Crown and was declared the winner of the season.

Episode	Bottom contestants			Song	Eliminated
1	Creatine Price	vs.	Margarette	"Golden" (Huntrix)	Creatine Price
2	Holly White	vs.	Malawitte	"Champagne" (Suzane)	Malawitte
3	Lana Cotta	vs.	Margarette	"Le sens de la vie" (Tal)	Margarette
4	Azemylia	vs.	Holly White	"Clic clic pan pan" (Yanns)	Holly White
5	Fluffy Bidule	vs.	La Harpie	"Rage" (Ebony)	Fluffy Bidule
6	Daisy Superbitch	vs.	Sublyme	"Voilà" (Barbara Pravi)	None
7	Azemylia	vs.	La Harpie	"Tattoo" (Loreen)	La Harpie
Episode	Final contestants			Song	Winner
8	Daisy Superbitch	vs.	Lana Cotta	"Hung Up" (Madonna)	Lana Cotta

== Golden Baguette ==
Legend:

The contestant possessed the Golden Baguette and was able to save one of the bottom three queens.
The contestant either saved themself or was saved from the bottom.

Episode	Eliminated gifter	Receiver	Bottom Queens	Saved
2	Creatine Price	Margarette	Holly White, La Harpie and Malawitte	La Harpie
3	Malawitte	Holly White	Holly White, Lana Cotta and Margarette	Holly White
4	Margarette	Lana Cotta	Azemylia, Fluffy Bidule and Holly White	Fluffy Bidule
5	Holly White	Azemylia	Fluffy Bidule, La Harpie and Lana Cotta	Lana Cotta
6	Fluffy Bidule	Lana Cotta	Daisy Superbitch, Lana Cotta and Sublyme	Lana Cotta

== Guest judges ==
Listed in chronological order:

- Isabelle Adjani, actress
- Bilal Hassani, singer-songwriter and Eurovision Song Contest 2019 French representative
- Kevin Germanier, Swiss fashion designer
- Camille Cottin, actress
- Noam Sinseau, comedian and dancer
- Fatou Guinea, actress and entrepreneur
- Jessé Rémond Lacroix, comedian, writer and actor
- Ebony, singer
- Marguerite, singer-songwriter and actress
- Galia Salimo, dancer and vedette
- Vinii Revlon, ballroom dancer and choreographer
- Loreen, singer
- Thomas Jolly, actor and artistic director

=== Special guests ===
Guests who appeared in episodes, but did not judge on the main stage.

==== Episode 1 ====
- Jonathan Jenvrin, dancer and choreographer
- Marlène Schaff, singer, comedian and drag performer
- Upsilone, disc jockey and record producer

==== Episode 3 ====
- Yacine Challal, jewelry designer and president of Y'Paris

==== Episode 5 ====
- Philippine, singer-songwriter and record producer

==== Episode 6 ====
- Kam Hugh, contestant on Drag Race France Season 1 and Miss Congeniality on Drag Race France All Stars

==== Episode 8 ====
- Ruby on the Nail, runner-up on Drag Race France Season 3
- Norma Bell, Miss Congeniality on Drag Race France Season 3
- Le Filip, winner of Drag Race France Season 3

== Episodes ==
No. overall	No. in season	Title	Original release date
26	1	"Drag Academy"	8 July 2026
Ten queens enter the werkroom. Nicky Doll then reveals the twist of the season: each week, the eliminated queen of the previous episode will assign the Golden Baguette to a queen of her choice. The recipient will get the power to save one of the bottom three queens from lip-syncing. For the first mini-challenge, the queens showcase their singing, comedy, and dancing skills. Azemylia wins the mini-challenge. For the main challenge, the queens write, record, and perform verses to "Belle et Fière" (Beautiful and Proud). On the runway, category is Dress Excess. Azemylia, Malawitte, and Sublyme receive positive critiques, with Azemylia winning the challenge. Creatine Price, La Harpie, and Margarette receive negative critiques, with La Harpie being safe. Creatine Price and Margarette lip-sync to "Golden" by Huntrix. Margarette wins the lip-sync and Creatine Price is the first queen to sashay away.: Guest Judge: Isabelle Adjani; Mini-Challenge: Showcase singing, comedy, and dancing skills; Mini-Challenge Winner: Azemylia; Main Challenge: Write, record, and perform verses to "Belle et Fière" (Beautiful and Proud); Runway Theme: Dress Excess; Challenge Winner: Azemylia; Challenge Prize: A one year supply of bouquets from Florajet.com; Bottom Two: Creatine Price and Margarette; Lip-Sync Song: "Golden" by Huntrix; Eliminated: Creatine Price; Farewell Message: "Be kind to each other – It's all you've got! Bisous Bitches! – xo CP"
27	2	"La Boulangerie Est Ouverte"	16 July 2026
At the beginning of the episode, it is revealed that Creatine Price gifted the Golden Baguette to Margarette. For this week's mini-challenge, the queens participate in a sack race to retrieve a baguette for Nicky Doll. Sublyme wins the mini-challenge. For the main challenge, the queens perform a talent show in front of the judges.: Azemylia - Dancing; Daisy Superbitch - Comedy Performance; Fluffy Bidule - Accordion Playing/Comedy Performance; Holly White - Gymnastics; La Harpie - Comedy Performance; Lana Cotta - Burlesque; Malawitte - Speed Sewing; Margarette - Comedy Performance; Sublyme - Burlesque; On the runway, category is Intergalactic. Azemylia, Daisy Superbitch and Margarette receive positive critiques, with Daisy Superbitch winning the challenge. Holly White, La Harpie and Malawitte receive negative critiques. Margarette uses the Golden Baguette to save La Harpie from the bottom two. Holly White and Malawitte lip-sync to "Champagne" by Suzane. Holly White wins the lip-sync and Malawitte sashays away.: Guest Judges: Bilal Hassani and Kevin Germanier; Mini-Challenge: Participate in a sack race to retrieve a baguette for Nicky Doll; Mini-Challenge Winner: Sublyme; Main Challenge: Perform a talent show in front of the judges; Runway Theme: Intergalactic; Challenge Winner: Daisy Superbitch; Challenge Prize: A €1,500 cash tip courtesy of Louis de Poortere; Bottom Two: Holly White and Malawitte; Lip-Sync Song: "Champagne" by Suzane; Eliminated: Malawitte; Farewell Message: "Pour toujours dans l'Histoire, je vous aime mes soeurs. La Mala ♡" ("Forever in history, I love you, my sisters. La Mala ♡")
28	3	"Drag Vinci Code, The Musidrag"	23 July 2026
At the beginning of the episode, it is revealed that Malawitte gifted the Golden Baguette to Holly White. For this week's mini-challenge, the queens read each other to filth. Holly White wins the mini-challenge. For the main challenge, the queens perform in Le Drag Vinci Code: Le Musidrag (The Drag Vinci Code: The Rusical).: Azemylia - Security Guard; Daisy Superbitch - Police Officer 2; Fluffy Bidule - Mona Lisa; Holly White - Karine; La Harpie - Museum Director; Lana Cotta - Police Officer 1; Margarette - The Thief; Sublyme - Emiline; On the runway, category is Une nuit au musée (A Night at the Museum). Daisy Superbitch, Fluffy Bidule and La Harpie receive positive critiques, with Fluffy Bidule winning the challenge. Holly White, Lana Cotta and Margarette receive negative critiques. Holly White uses the Golden Baguette to save herself from the bottom two. Lana Cotta and Margarette lip-sync to "Le sens de la vie" by Tal. Lana Cotta wins the lip-sync and Margarette sashays away.: Guest Judges: Camille Cottin and Noam Sinseau; Mini-Challenge: Reading is Fundamental; Mini-Challenge Winner: Holly White; Main Challenge: Le Drag Vinci Code: Le Musidrag (The Drag Vinci Code: The Rusical); Runway Theme: Une nuit au musée (A Night at the Museum); Challenge Winner: Fluffy Bidule; Challenge Prize: A €500 cash tip; Bottom Two: Lana Cotta and Margarette; Lip-Sync Song: "Le sens de la vie" by Tal; Eliminated: Margarette; Farewell Message: "🏠🧍‍♀️😞 MOI KI RENTRE. LOVE U. MAGGIE♡" ("🏠🧍‍♀️😞 ME GOING HOME. LOVE U. MAGGIE♡")
29	4	"Le Grand Snatch Game"	30 July 2026
At the beginning of the episode, it is revealed that Margarette gifted the Golden Baguette to Lana Cotta. For this week's mini-challenge, the queens paint a portrait of Nicky Doll. For the main challenge, the queens play the Snatch Game. Fatou Guinea and Jessé Rémond Lacroix star as the celebrity contestants. The cast consisted of: Azemylia - Fauve Hautot; Daisy Superbitch - Jacques Chirac; Fluffy Bidule - Marianne James; Holly White - Mariah Carey; La Harpie - Lara Fabian; Lana Cotta - Celine Dion; Sublyme - Franck Ribéry; On the runway, category is Entrée, plat, dessert (Appetizer, Entrée, Dessert). Daisy Superbitch, Lana Cotta and Sublyme receive positive critiques, with Lana Cotta winning the challenge. Azemylia, Fluffy Bidule and Holly White receive negative critiques. Lana Cotta uses the Golden Baguette to save Fluffy Bidule from the bottom two. Azemylia and Holly White lip-sync to "Clic clic pan pan" by Yanns. Azemylia wins the lip-sync and Holly White sashays away.: Guest Judges: Fatou Guinea and Jessé Rémond Lacroix; Mini-Challenge: Paint a portrait of Nicky Doll; Main Challenge: Snatch Game; Runway Theme: Entrée, plat, dessert (Appetizer, Entrée, Dessert); Challenge Winner: Lana Cotta; Challenge Prize: A one year supply of manga courtesy of Akata Publishing; Bottom Two: Azemylia and Holly White; Lip-Sync Song: "Clic clic pan pan" by Yanns; Eliminated: Holly White; Farewell Message: "C'est pas la fin mais que le Début! Paroles de sage :) J'vous love ♡" ("This isn't the end, it's just the beginning! Wise words :) I love you ♡")
30	5	"Pop Couture"	6 August 2026
At the beginning of the episode, it is revealed that Holly White gifted the Golden Baguette to Azemylia. For this week's main challenge, the queens write, record, and perform verses to "Hands Up" and "Parfaite". Nicky Doll then reveals to the queens that they need to design their girl group looks as well.: Team Félinx (Felines) - Azemylia, Daisy Superbitch and Sublyme performing "Hand Up"; Team Palace Pétasses (Palace Sluts) - Fluffy Bidule, La Harpie and Lana Cotta performing "Parfaite"; On the runway, category is Pop Culture. Team Félinx is the winning team, with Azemylia, Daisy Superbitch and Sublyme all winning the challenge. Team Palace Pétasses is the losing team. Azemylia uses the Golden Baguette to save Lana Cotta from the bottom two. Fluffy Bidule and La Harpie lip-sync to "Rage" by Ebony. La Harpie wins the lip-sync and Fluffy Bidule sashays away.: Guest Judges: Ebony and Marguerite; Main Challenge: Write, record and perform "Hands Up" and "Parfaite"; design and create looks for the girl groups; Runway Theme: Pop Culture; Challenge Winner: Azemylia, Daisy Superbitch and Sublyme; Challenge Prize: A €500 cash tip each courtesy of Saé; Bottom Two: Fluffy Bidule and La Harpie; Lip-Sync Song: "Rage" by Ebony; Eliminated: Fluffy Bidule; Farewell Message: "Bon écoutez, trouvez une phrase sympa et créditez-moi ! Fluffy, avec haine ♡ love u ALL. Lanarpie" ("Okay, listen up—come up with a cool line and give me credit! Fluffy, with hate ♡ love you ALL. Lanarpie")
31	6	"Makeover, La Maison Du Drag"	13 August 2026
At the beginning of the episode, it is revealed that Fluffy Bidule gifted the Golden Baguette to Lana Cotta. For this week's mini-challenge, the queens try and sell different products on the show Queen veut être mon associée ? (Does Queen Want to be My Business Partner?). Lana Cotta wins the mini-challenge. For the main challenge, the queens give drag makeovers to LGBT youth members of the LGBTQIA+ organization Le Refuge. On the runway, category is We Are Family. Azemylia and La Harpie receive positive critiques, with La Harpie winning the challenge. Daisy Superbitch, Lana Cotta and Sublyme receive negative critiques. Lana Cotta uses the Golden Baguette to save herself from the bottom two. Daisy Superbitch and Sublyme lip-sync to "Voilà" by Barbara Pravi. Both queens win the lip-sync and no one goes home.: Guest Judges: Galia Salimo and Vinii Revlon; Mini-Challenge: Sell products for Queen veut être mon associée ? (Does Queen Want to be My Business Partner?); Mini-Challenge Winner: Lana Cotta; Main Challenge: Makeover; Runway Theme: We Are Family; Challenge Winner: La Harpie; Challenge Prize: A €500 cash tip; Bottom Two: Daisy Superbitch and Sublyme; Lip-Sync Song: "Voilà" by Barbara Pravi; Eliminated: None
32	7	"Roast, The Wedding of Daphné and Loïc"	20 August 2026
33	8	"Queen of France"	27 August 2026
