= Misty Phoenix =

French drag performer

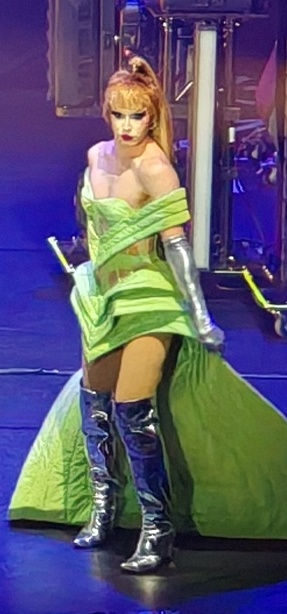
- Misty Phoenix in 2025
- Born: Ulysse Gambeau
- Television: Drag Race France

Misty Phoenix is the stage name of Ulysse Gambeau, a French drag performer who competed on the third season of Drag Race France and the first season of Drag Race France All Stars.

== Filmography ==
- Drag Race France (season 3)
- Drag Race France All Stars (2025)
