= Talent Show Extravaganza =

Talent Show Extravaganza may refer to:

- "Talent Show Extravaganza", a 2021 episode on RuPaul's Drag Race Down Under season 1
- "Talent Show Extravaganza", a 2024 episode on Drag Race France season 3

== See also ==
- "All Star Talent Show Extravaganza", a 2016 episode on RuPaul's Drag Race All Stars season 2
