= Drag Race France season 2 =

2023 season of Drag Race France

Drag Race France
- Season 2
- Promotional poster for season two
- Hosted by: Nicky Doll
- Judges: Nicky Doll; Daphné Bürki; Kiddy Smile
- No. of contestants: 11
- Winner: Keiona
- Runner-up: Sara Forever
- Miss Congeniality: Moon
- No. of episodes: 9

Release
- Original network: France.tv Slash (France); WOW Presents Plus (International)
- Original release: 30 June – 25 August 2023

Season chronology
- ← Previous; Season 1 Next → Season 3

The second season of Drag Race France premiered on 30 June 2023. The season was confirmed by France Télévisions on 12 August 2022. The season was broadcast on the digital channel France.tv Slash every Thursday, but also aired on France 2 every Saturday night in France, and on WOW Presents Plus internationally.

The winner of the second of Drag Race France was Keiona, with Sara Forever as the runner-up. Moon was named Miss Congeniality.

== Production ==
On 7 October 2022, it was announced via the shows official Instagram page, that casting for the second season was now open. Applications remained open for four weeks until closing on 31 October 2022.

On 26 January 2023, it was announced via France.tv Slash Instagram page, that judges Nicky Doll, Daphné Bürki, and Kiddy Smile would recur their roles again during season 2.

The production company, World of Wonder, released a 30-second teaser on social media. The clip showcases the host, Nicky Doll, in a snow globe-themed set with the season two contestants (without showing their faces).

Eleven contestants were announced on 1 June 2023. Participants include Legendary alumna Keiona, member of the House of Revlon, as well as Rose and Punani, the Drag Race franchise's second drag duo, following Sugar and Spice from the American adaptation.

On 6 June 2023 an aftershow, named Drama Queens, chez Paloma, was announced. In this series, the equivalent version of the American The Pit Stop, features season 1 winner Paloma and guest, typically a competitor from Season 1, discussing the recently aired episode.

== Contestants ==
Ages, names, and cities stated are at time of filming.

Contestants of Drag Race France season 2 and their backgrounds
Contestant	Age	Hometown	Outcome
Keiona (Note: Keiona Revlon is referred to as Keiona on the show.)	31	Paris, Île-de-France	Winner
Sara Forever	33	Bordeaux, Nouvelle-Aquitaine	Runner-up
Mami Watta	24	Saint-Denis, Île-de-France	3rd place
Punani (Note: Punani Jellinsky is referred to as Punani on the show. Although competing individually, Rose and her perform as a duo in life.)	32	Paris, Île-de-France	3rd place
Piche	26	Arles, Provence-Alpes-Côte-d'Azur	5th place (Note: Piche originally placed eighth before re-entering the competition.)
Cookie Kunty	29	Paris, Île-de-France	6th place
Moon	31	Geneva, Switzerland	7th place (Note: Moon quit the competition before the lip sync. She was later voted Miss Congeniality by her fellow contestants.)
Ginger Bitch	44	Nice, Provence-Alpes-Côte d'Azur	8th place
Kitty Space	27	Lyon, Auvergne-Rhône-Alpes	9th place
Vespi	23	Lille, Hauts-de-France	10th place
Rose (Note: Rose Van Dome is referred to as Rose on the show. Although competing individually, Punani and her perform as a duo in life.)	32	Paris, Île-de-France	11th place

== Contestants progress ==
Legend:

Keiona won Drag Race France season 2.
Sara Forever was the runner-up.
Moon was voted Miss Congeniality (Miss C) by fellow contestants.
WIN indicates that the contestant won the challenge.
IN indicates that the contestant won the eliminated queens challenge, won the lip sync for their life and re-entered the competition.
SAFE indicates that the contestant was declared safe by the judges.
BTM (Bottom) indicates that the contestant was up for elimination.
ELIM (Eliminated) indicates that the contestant was eliminated.
QUIT indicates that Moon quit the competition.
OUT indicates that the contestant returned to win re-entry into the competition, but lost.
Guest indicates that the contestant returned as a guest.

Contestants progress with placements in each episode
Contestant	Episode								
Contestant	1	2	3	4	5	6	7	8	9
Keiona	SAFE	SAFE	SAFE	SAFE	WIN	WIN	SAFE	SAFE	Winner
Sara Forever	WIN	SAFE	WIN	SAFE	SAFE	BTM	WIN	WIN	Runner-up
Mami Watta	SAFE	SAFE	SAFE	SAFE	SAFE	SAFE	SAFE	SAFE	Eliminated
Punani	SAFE	SAFE	SAFE	WIN	BTM	SAFE	SAFE	BTM	Eliminated
Piche	SAFE	WIN	SAFE	ELIM			IN	ELIM	Guest
Cookie Kunty	SAFE	BTM	BTM	SAFE	SAFE	WIN	ELIM		Guest
Moon	SAFE	SAFE	SAFE	SAFE	SAFE	QUIT			Miss C
Ginger Bitch	SAFE	SAFE	SAFE	BTM	ELIM		OUT		Guest
Kitty Space	BTM	SAFE	ELIM				OUT		Guest
Vespi	SAFE	ELIM					OUT		Guest
Rose	ELIM						OUT		Guest

== Lip syncs ==
Legend:

The contestant was eliminated after their first time in the bottom.
The contestant was eliminated after their second time in the bottom.
The contestant was eliminated after their third time in the bottom.
The contestant won the Lip Sync for the Crown and was declared the winner of the season.

Episode	Contestants			Song	Eliminated
1	Kitty Space	vs.	Rose	"3SEX" (Indochine, Christine and the Queens)	Rose
2	Cookie Kunty	vs.	Vespi	"Tout" (Lara Fabian)	Vespi
3	Cookie Kunty	vs.	Kitty Space	"Monday Tuesday... Laissez moi danser" (Dalida)	Kitty Space
4	Ginger Bitch	vs.	Piche	"Je vais vite" (Lorie)	Piche
5	Ginger Bitch	vs.	Punani	"Le dernier jour du disco" (Juliette Armanet)	Ginger Bitch
6	Sara Forever (Note: Moon, who was up for elimination, quit the competition before lip-syncing. Therefore, Sara Forever was joined by all the other contestants in a symbolic performance.)			"Tu m'oublieras" (Larusso)	None
7	Cookie Kunty	vs.	Piche	"Et alors !" (Shy'm)	Cookie Kunty
8	Piche	vs.	Punani	"Une femme avec une femme" (Mecano)	Piche
Episode	Final contestants			Song	Winner
9	Keiona	vs.	Sara Forever	"Titanium" (David Guetta ft. Sia)	Keiona

== Guest judges ==
Listed in chronological order:

- Chris, singer and songwriter
- Nicola Sirkis, singer
- Zahia Dehar, model and actress
- Loïc Prigent, fashion journalist and documentary filmmaker
- Rossy de Palma, actress and model
- Amanda Lear, singer, actress and television presenter
- Eddy de Pretto, singer-songwriter and actor
- Barbara Butch, DJ and activist
- Juliette Armanet, singer
- Christian Louboutin, fashion designer
- Léna Situations, author and social media personality
- Virginie Despentes, writer, novelist, and filmmaker
- Victor Weinsanto, fashion designer
- La Zarra, singer and Eurovision 2023 French representative
- Nicolas Huchard, choreographer and dancer

=== Special guests ===
Guests who appeared in episodes, but did not judge on the main stage.

Episode 1

- Jean Ranobrac, photographer
- Claude Cormier, choreographer

Episode 2

- Elips, contestant and Miss Congeniality on the first season of Drag Race France
- La Big Bertha, contestant on the first season of Drag Race France
- La Briochée, contestant on the first season of Drag Race France
- La Grande Dame, runner-up on the first season of Drag Race France and season 2 of RuPaul's Drag Race: UK vs. The World
- La Kahena, contestant on the first season of Drag Race France and season 2 of Canada's Drag Race: Canada vs. the World
- Kam Hugh, contestant on the first season of Drag Race France
- Lolita Banana, contestant on the first season of Drag Race France and co-host of Drag Race México
- Lova Ladiva, contestant on the first season of Drag Race France
- Paloma, winner of the first season of Drag Race France
- Soa de Muse, runner-up on the first season of Drag Race France and 9th place on RuPaul's Drag Race Global All Stars

Episode 4

- Juda La Vidange, drag king

Episode 6

- Bilal Hassani, singer-songwriter and Eurovision Song Contest 2019 French representative

Episode 8

- Lova Ladiva, contestant on the first season of Drag Race France

Episode 9

- Bilal Hassani, singer-songwriter and Eurovision 2019 French representative
- Chris, singer and songwriter
- Iris Mittenaere, Miss France 2016 and Miss Universe 2016
- Nicola Sirkis, singer
- Olivier Rousteing, fashion designer and creative director of Balmain
- Shy'm, singer
- Victor Weinsanto, fashion designer
- Zahia Dehar, model and actress
- Elips, contestant and Miss Congeniality on the first season of Drag Race France
- La Big Bertha, contestant on the first season of Drag Race France
- Lova Ladiva, contestant on the first season of Drag Race France
- Paloma, winner of the first season of Drag Race France

== Episodes ==
No. overall	No. in season	Title	Original release date
9	1	"A Lé-Gen-Daire Return" "Un retour LÉ-GEN-DAIRE"	30 June 2023
Eleven queens enter the workroom. For the first mini-challenge, the queens do a garden photoshoot. Punani wins the mini-challenge. For the main challenge, the queens write, record, and perform verses to "We Are Légendaires". On the runway, category is SuperDrag. Keiona, Punani and Sara Forever receive positive critiques, with Sara Forever winning the challenge. Ginger Bitch, Kitty Space, Rose receive negative critiques, with Ginger Bitch being safe. Kitty Space and Rose lip-sync to "3SEX" by Indochine and Christine and the Queens. Kitty Space wins the lip-sync and Rose is the first queen to sashay away.: Guest Judges: Chris and Nicola Sirkis; Mini-Challenge: Garden photoshoot; Mini-Challenge Winner: Punani; Main Challenge: Write, record, and perform verses to “We Are Légendaires”; Runway Theme: SuperDrag; Challenge Winner: Sara Forever; Challenge Prize: A €2,500 worth of products from Horace; Bottom Two: Kitty Space and Rose; Lip-Sync Song: "3SEX" by Indochine and Christine and the Queens; Eliminated: Rose; Farewell Message: "Comme le disait Céline (pas l’auteur, l’autre): "Les derniers seront les premiers". Donnez tout (surtout toi Punani ❤️)" ("Like Céline said (not the author, the other one) "The last will be the first". Give it your all (especially you Punani ❤️)")
10	2	"It’s Show Night" "C’est show ce soir"	7 July 2023
For this week's mini-challenge, the queens get into panda drag and dance to a remix of "Pandi-Panda" by Chantal Goya. Moon wins the mini-challenge. For the main challenge, the queens perform a talent show in front of the judges.: Cookie Kunty - Singing and puppetry; Ginger Bitch - Stand-up comedy routine; Keiona - Lip-syncing and voguing; Kitty Space - Comedy dance performance; Mami Watta - Original song; Moon - Original song and painting; Piche - Live singing and original song; Punani - Comedy performance; Sara Forever - Lip-syncing; Vespi - Mime routine; On the runway, category is 2 en 1 (2 in 1). Ginger Bitch, Keiona, Piche and Sara Forever receive positive critiques, with Piche winning the challenge. Cookie Kunty, Mami Watta and Vespi receive negative critiques, with Mami Watta being safe. Cookie Kunty and Vespi lip-sync to "Tout" by Lara Fabian. Cookie Kunty wins the lip-sync and Vespi sashays away.: Guest Judge: Zahia Dehar; Mini-Challenge: Get into panda drag and dance to a remix of "Pandi-Panda" by Chantal Goya; Mini-Challenge Winner: Moon; Main Challenge: Perform a talent show in front of the judges; Runway Theme: 2 en 1 (2 in 1); Challenge Winner: Piche; Challenge Prize: A trip to Malta; Bottom Two: Cookie Kunty and Vespi; Lip-Sync Song: "Tout" by Lara Fabian; Eliminated: Vespi; Farewell Message: "Croyez en vos rêves et rendez-moi fière. Je vous aime. Vespi 💋" ("Believe in your dreams and make me proud. I love you. Vespi 💋")
11	3	"Motor, Dragtion!" "Moteur, dragtion !"	14 July 2023
For this week's mini-challenge, the queens read each other to filth. Piche wins the mini-challenge. For the main challenge, the queens host in the new morning show "Le Croissant Show".: Main Hosts - Piche and Punani; Interviewer - Sara Forever; Weather Reporter - Moon; Workout Instructor - Mami Watta; Astrologer - Keiona; Telemarketer - Kitty Space; Chefs - Cookie Kunty and Ginger Bitch; On the runway, category is La nuit des 1000 Dalida (Night of a Thousand Dalida's). Ginger Bitch, Keiona and Sara Forever receive positive critiques, with Sara Forever winning the challenge. Cookie Kunty, Kitty Space and Mami Watta receive negative critiques, with Mami Watta being safe. Cookie Kunty and Kitty Space lip-sync to "Monday Tuesday... Laissez moi danser" by Dalida. Cookie Kunty wins the lip-sync and Kitty Space sashays away.: Guest Judges: Loïc Prigent and Rossy de Palma; Mini-Challenge: Reading is Fundamental; Mini-Challenge Winner: Piche; Main Challenge: Host in the new morning show "Le Croissant Show"; Runway Theme: La nuit des 1000 Dalida (Night of a Thousand Dalida’s); Challenge Winner: Sara Forever; Challenge Prize: Jewelry from YPARIS; Bottom Two: Cookie Kunty and Kitty Space; Lip-Sync Song: "Monday Tuesday... Laissez moi danser" by Dalida; Eliminated: Kitty Space; Farewell Message: "On devient fort par ses échecs et non par ses succès. Coco Chanel ❤️" ("We get strong with our failures, not with our successes. Coco Chanel ❤️")
12	4	"Snatch Game - France Season 2" "Le Snatch Game"	21 July 2023
For this week's mini-challenge, the queens pair up and act as a couple getting married by exchanging vows and playing a wedding game. Cookie Kunty and Moon win the mini-challenge. For the main challenge, the queens play the Snatch Game. Amanda Lear and Eddy de Pretto star as the celebrity contestants. The cast consisted of: Cookie Kunty as Johnny Hallyday; Ginger Bitch as Victoria Silvstedt; Keiona as Afida Turner; Mami Watta as Shauna Sand; Moon as Brigitte Fontaine; Piche as Geneviève de Fontenay; Punani as Amanda Lear; Sara Forever as Françoise Sagan; On the runway, category is Sous l'Océan (Under the Ocean). Keiona, Moon and Punani receive positive critiques, with Punani winning the challenge. Ginger Bitch, Piche and Sara Forever receive negative critiques, with Sara Forever being safe. Ginger Bitch and Piche lip-sync to "Je vais vite" by Lorie. Ginger Bitch wins the lip-sync and Piche sashays away.: Guest Judges: Amanda Lear and Eddy de Pretto; Mini-Challenge: In pairs, act as a couple getting married by exchanging vows and playing a wedding game; Mini-Challenge Winners: Cookie Kunty and Moon; Main Challenge: Snatch Game; Runway Theme: Sous l'Océan (Under the Ocean); Challenge Winner: Punani; Challenge Prize: A luxury outfit from Patou worth €2,500; Bottom Two: Ginger Bitch and Piche; Lip-Sync Song: "Je vais vite" by Lorie; Eliminated: Piche; Farewell Message: "Si heureuse d'être la rebelle queen de cette saison HAHA. Défoncez tout bande d'haurie (Désolé pour les fautes) LA GROSSE PICHE ❤️" ("So happy to be this season's rebel queen HAHA. Defoncez tout bande d'haurie (Sorry about the misspellings.) THE BIG PICHE ❤️")
13	5	"The Musidrag" "Le Bossu de Notre Drag"	28 July 2023
For this week's mini-challenge, the queens have to grab a key from a jar filled with random substances to unlock a lock. Keiona wins the mini-challenge. For the main challenge, the queens perform in Le Bossu de Notre Drag: The Rusical (The Hunchback of Notre Drag: The Rusical).: Cookie Kunty plays Narrator; Ginger Bitch plays Esmeraldoigt; Keiona plays Quasimolo; Mami Watta plays Boulangère; Moon plays Malo; Punani plays Dragouili; Sara Forever plays Dragouilla; On the runway, category is Démesure Couture (Excessive Couture). Cookie Kunty, Keiona and Moon receive positive critiques, with Keiona winning the challenge. Ginger Bitch and Punani receive negative critiques, and are announced as the bottom two. They lip-sync to "Le dernier jour du disco" by Juliette Armanet. Punani wins the lip-sync and Ginger Bitch sashays away.: Guest Judges: Barbara Butch and Juliette Armanet; Mini-Challenge: Grab a key from a jar filled with random substances to unlock a lock; Mini-Challenge Winner: Keiona; Main Challenge: Le Bossu de Notre Drag: The Rusical (The Hunchback of Notre Drag: The Rusical); Runway Theme: Démesure Couture (Excessive Couture); Challenge Winner: Keiona; Challenge Prize: A tailored outfit by Victor Weisanto provided by Nona Source; Bottom Two: Ginger Bitch and Punani; Lip-Sync Song: "Le dernier jour du disco" by Juliette Armanet; Eliminated: Ginger Bitch; Farewell Message: "Quelle aventure ! J'ai trouvé de nouvelles cops. ❤️ Je vous aime ! Et n'oubliez jamais d'allez vous faire tous... Des bisous ❤️ Bitch" ("What an adventure! I've found some new friends. ❤️ I love you! And never forget to go and get each other... Kisses ❤️ Bitch")
14	6	"Time Ball" "Time Ball"	4 August 2023
For this week's mini-challenge, the queens lip-sync live to "Transfert Trottinette" by Bilal Hassani. Punani wins the mini-challenge. For the main challenge, the queens create three looks for the Time Ball: Héroïne du passé (Heroine of the Past), Futuristic Chic, and Reine du Bal (Prom Queen). On the runway, Cookie Kunty, Keiona, Mami Watta and Punani receive positive critiques, with Cookie Kunty and Keiona both winning the challenge. Moon and Sara Forever receive negative critiques, and are announced as the bottom two. Before the lip-sync, Moon announces that she will be leaving the competition, due to mental health issues. Because of this decision, all remaining contestants lip-sync symbolically to "Tu m'oublieras" by Larusso with no further elimination.: Guest Judges: Léna Situations and Christian Louboutin; Mini-Challenge: Lip-sync live to "Transfert Trottinette" by Bilal Hassani; Mini-Challenge Winner: Punani; Main Challenge: The Time Ball; Runway Themes: Héroïne du passé (Heroine of the Past), Futuristique Chic and Reine du Bal (Prom Queen); Challenge Winners: Cookie Kunty and Keiona; Challenge Prize: A pair of embroidered boots from Christian Louboutin; Bottom Two: Moon and Sara Forever; Quit: Moon; Lip-Sync Song: "Tu m'oublieras" by Larusso; Farewell Message: "💘 Mes amours de tous les jours ! C'est ensemble qu'on est les plus fortes·x. Moon ❤️" ("💘 My everyday loves! It's together that we're the strongest. Moon ❤️")
15	7	"Showtime!" "Showtime !"	11 August 2023
For this week's mini-challenge, the queens have a bitchfest with puppets. Mami Watta wins the mini-challenge. For the main challenge, the queens perform in a girl group performance to Nicky Doll's "Attention" against the eliminated queens. Nicky Doll reveals that whoever is the worst in the challenge from the currently competing queens, will lip-sync against the best in the challenge from the eliminated queens. Whoever wins the lip-sync, will either remain in the competition, or return to the competition, with the loser of the lip-sync getting eliminated.: Team Les Revenantes (The Returnees): Ginger Bitch, Kitty Space, Piche, Rose and Vespi; Team Les 5 Fantastiques (The Fantastic 5): Cookie Kunty, Keiona, Mami Watta, Punani and Sara Forever; On the runway, category is Brillez pour nous (Shine For Us). Keiona, Mami Watta, Punani and Sara Forever receive positive critiques, with Sara Forever winning the challenge. Cookie Kunty receives mixed critiques, and is announced as the bottom one. Nicky Doll then reveals that Piche was the best of the eliminated queens. Cookie Kunty and Piche lip-sync to "Et alors!" by Shy'm. Piche wins the lip-sync and returns to the competition, and Cookie Kunty sashays away.: Guest Judges: Victor Weinsanto and Virginie Despentes; Mini-Challenge: Everybody Loves Puppets; Mini-Challenge Winner: Mami Watta; Main Challenge: Perform in a girl group performance to Nicky Doll's "Attention" against the eliminated queens; Runway Theme: Brillez pour nous (Shine For Us); Challenge Winner: Sara Forever; Challenge Prize: €2,000 worth of products from MAC Cosmetics; Bottom One: Cookie Kunty; Aspiring Returner: Piche; Lip-Sync Song: "Et alors!" by Shy'm; Returned: Piche; Eliminated: Cookie Kunty; Farewell Message: "Si vous ne vous faites pas briller ensemble, personne ne brillera. Je vous aime. Cookie 💋 ⚝" ("If you don't make each other shine together, no one will shine. I love you. Cookie 💋 ⚝")
16	8	"Queen Twice Over" "Plutôt deux fois queen"	18 August 2023
For this week's mini-challenge, the queens play in a parody of the game show Le maillon faible (The Weakest Link). Mami Watta wins the mini-challenge. For the main challenge, the queens makeover rugby players. On the runway, category is Belle de match (Match Point Beauty). Keiona and Sara Forever receive positive critiques, with Sara Forever winning the challenge. Mami Watta, Piche and Punani receive mixed critiques, with Mami Watta being safe. Piche and Punani lip-sync to "Une femme avec une femme" by Mecano. Punani wins the lip-sync and Piche sashays away.: Guest Judges: La Zarra and Nicholas Huchard; Mini-Challenge: Play in a parody of the game show Le maillon faible (The Weakest Link); Mini-Challenge Winner: Mami Watta; Main Challenge: Makeover rugby players; Runway Theme: Belle de match (Match Point Beauty); Challenge Winner: Sara Forever; Challenge Prize: A €2,000 mall gift card; Bottom Two: Piche and Punani; Lip-Sync Song: "Une femme avec une femme" by Mecano; Eliminated: Piche; Farewell Message: "Vous voulez un message ? Regardez de nouveau l’épisode 4 ! Merci la vie ❤️ Merci mes sœurs ❤️ Merci Drag Race France ❤️ À jamais votre Piche ❤️" ("Do you want a message? Watch again episode 4! Thank you, life ❤️ Thank you, my sisters ❤️ Thank you, Drag Race France ❤️ Forever your Piche ❤️")
17	9	"Grand Finale" "La Grande Finale"	25 August 2023
The queens all return for the live grand finale. On the runway, category is Dragnifique (Dragnificent). The final four queens each perform to a song that was written specifically for them. Keiona lip-syncs to "Déjà une star", Punani lip-syncs to "La Punanimité", Mami Watta lip-syncs to "Moi, moi, moi", and Sara Forever lip-syncs to "Madame Forever". It is announced that the final two queens are Keiona and Sara Forever, meaning Mami Watta and Punani are eliminated. It is then announced that Moon is this season's Miss Congeniality. Keiona and Sara Forever then lip-sync to "Titanium" by David Guetta ft. Sia. It is then announced that Keiona is the winner, leaving Sara Forever as the runner-up.: Finals venue: Grand Rex, Paris, France; Final Four: Keiona, Mami Watta, Punani, and Sara Forever; Runway Theme: Dragnifique (Dragnificent); Eliminated: Mami Watta and Punani; Miss Congeniality: Moon; Final Two: Keiona and Sara Forever; Lip Sync Song: "Titanium" by David Guetta ft. Sia; Runner-up: Sara Forever; Winner of Drag Race France Season Two: Keiona
