= Drag Race France season 3 =

2024 season of Drag Race France

Drag Race France
- Season 3
- Promotional poster for season three
- Hosted by: Nicky Doll
- Judges: Nicky Doll; Daphné Bürki; Kiddy Smile
- No. of contestants: 10
- Winner: Le Filip
- Runner-up: Ruby on the Nail
- Miss Congeniality: Norma Bell
- No. of episodes: 8

Release
- Original network: France 2 (France); WOW Presents Plus (International)
- Original release: 31 May – 19 July 2024

Season chronology
- ← Previous; Season 2 Next → Season 4

The third season of Drag Race France premiered on May 31, 2024. For this season, the show moved completely to France 2 in France, and airs on WOW Presents Plus internationally. The season was confirmed by World of Wonder on 17 October 2023.

== Production ==
On 19 October 2023, it was announced via the shows official Instagram page, that casting for the third season was now open. Applications remained open for four weeks until closing on 10 November 2023.

On 16 March 2024, France.tv Instagram page released a 10-second teaser on social media. The clip showcases the host, Nicky Doll, in a beach-themed set.

Ten contestants were announced on 24 April 2024. Participants include The Switch Drag Race season 2 winner and Queen of the Universe season 1 contestant Leona Winter. On the same day it was announced that judges Daphné Bürki and Kiddy Smile would recur their roles again during season 3.

== Contestants ==
Ages, names, and cities stated are at time of filming.

Contestants of Drag Race France season 3 and their backgrounds
| Contestant | Age | Hometown | Outcome |
|---|---|---|---|
| Le Filip | 29 | Paris, Île-de-France | Winner |
| Ruby on the Nail | 34 | Marseille, Provence-Alpes-Côte d'Azur | Runner-up |
| Leona Winter (Note: Now known as Leona Winter, she was referred to as Miss Leona on The Switch Drag Race season 2.) | 28 | Perpignan, Occitanie | 3rd place |
| Lula Strega | 26 | Paris, Île-de-France | 3rd place |
| Misty Phoenix | 23 | Avignon, Provence-Alpes-Côte d'Azur | 5th place |
| Perseo (Note: Drag Perseo is referred to as Perseo on the show.) | 21 | Las Palmas, Spain | 6th place |
| Norma Bell | 25 | Saint-Denis, Réunion | 7th place (Note: Norma Bell was voted Miss Congeniality by fellow contestants.) |
| Edeha Noire | 34 | Lyon, Auvergne-Rhône-Alpes | 8th place |
| Magnetica | 24 | Paris, Île-de-France | 9th place |
| Afrodite Amour | 27 | Lyon, Auvergne-Rhône-Alpes | 10th place |

== Contestant progress ==
Legend:

Le Filip won Drag Race France season 3.
Ruby on the Nail was the runner-up.
Norma Bell was voted Miss Congeniality (Miss C).
WIN indicates that the contestant won the challenge.
TOP2 indicates that the contestant was one of the two best performing in the challenge, but lost the lip sync to win it.
SAFE indicates that the contestant was declared safe by the judges.
BTM (Bottom) indicates that the contestant was up for elimination.
ELIM (Eliminated) indicates that the contestant was eliminated.
Guest indicates that the contestant returned as a guest.

Contestants progress with placements in each episode
| Contestant | Episode | | | | | | | |
| Contestant | 1 | 2 | 3 | 4 | 5 | 6 | 7 | 8 |
|---|---|---|---|---|---|---|---|---|
| Le Filip | SAFE | SAFE | SAFE | TOP2 | BTM | SAFE | SAFE | Winner |
| Ruby on the Nail | SAFE | BTM | BTM | SAFE | WIN | WIN | SAFE | Runner-up |
| Leona Winter | SAFE | SAFE | SAFE | WIN | SAFE | SAFE | BTM | Eliminated |
| Lula Strega | SAFE | SAFE | WIN | SAFE | SAFE | SAFE | WIN | Eliminated |
| Misty Phoenix | SAFE | SAFE | SAFE | SAFE | SAFE | BTM | ELIM | Guest |
| Perseo | SAFE | WIN | SAFE | SAFE | SAFE | ELIM | | Guest |
| Norma Bell | WIN | SAFE | SAFE | SAFE | ELIM | | | Miss C |
| Edeha Noire | BTM | SAFE | ELIM | | | | | Guest |
| Magnetica | SAFE | ELIM | | | | | | Guest |
| Afrodite Amour | ELIM | | | | | | | Guest |

== Lip syncs ==
Legend:

The contestant was eliminated after their first time in the bottom.
The contestant was eliminated after their second time in the bottom.
The contestant won the lip sync to win the challenge.
The contestant won the Lip Sync for the Crown and was declared the winner of the season.

| Episode | Bottom contestants | | | Song | Eliminated |
|---|---|---|---|---|---|
| 1 | Afrodite Amour | vs. | Edeha Noire | "Sur le fil" (Jenifer) | Afrodite Amour |
| 2 | Magnetica | vs. | Ruby on the Nail | "Gigi l'amoroso" (Dalida) | Magnetica |
| 3 | Edeha Noire | vs. | Ruby on the Nail | "C'est l'amour" (Clara Luciani) | Edeha Noire |
| Episode | Top contestants | | | Song | Winner |
| 4 | Le Filip | vs. | Leona Winter | "Pour que tu m'aimes encore" (Céline Dion) | Leona Winter |
| Episode | Bottom contestants | | | Song | Eliminated |
| 5 | Le Filip | vs. | Norma Bell | "Marcia Baïla" (Les Rita Mitsouko) | Norma Bell |
| 6 | Misty Phoenix | vs. | Perseo | "Hey Mama" (David Guetta ft. Nicki Minaj, Bebe Rexha, Afrojack) | Perseo |
| 7 | Leona Winter | vs. | Misty Phoenix | "En rouge et noir" (Jeanne Mas) | Misty Phoenix |
| Episode | Final contestants | | | Song | Winner |
| 8 | Le Filip | vs. | Ruby on the Nail | "I'm Alive" (Céline Dion) | Le Filip |

== Guest judges ==
Listed in chronological order:

- Charles de Vilmorin, stylist and designer
- Jenifer, singer and actress
- Guillaume Diop, dancer
- Virginie Efira, actress
- Clara Luciani, singer
- Loïc Prigent, fashion journalist
- Louane, singer and actress
- Woodkid, singer and director
- Cristina Córdula, TV presenter and former model
- Tahnee, comedian
- Béatrice Dalle, actress
- Meryl Bie, influencer
- Diane Kruger, actress
- Panayotis Pascot, comedian, actor, and writer

=== Special guests ===
Guests who appeared in episodes, but did not judge on the main stage.

Episode 1

- Jean Ranobrac, photographer
- Claude Cormier, choreographer

Episode 2

- Cookie Kunty, contestant on the second season of Drag Race France
- Ginger Bitch, contestant on the second season of Drag Race France
- Keiona, winner of the second season of Drag Race France
- Kitty Space, contestant on the second season of Drag Race France
- Mami Watta, contestant on the second season of Drag Race France
- Moon, contestant and Miss Congeniality on the second season of Drag Race France
- Piche, contestant on the second season of Drag Race France
- Punani, contestant on the second season of Drag Race France
- Rose, contestant on the second season of Drag Race France
- Sara Forever, runner-up on the second season of Drag Race France
- Vespi, contestant on the second season of Drag Race France

Episode 4

- Fabien, Céline Dion impersonator
- Piche, contestant on the second season of Drag Race France

Episode 6

- Sergei, drag king

Episode 7

- Lova Ladiva, contestant on the first season of Drag Race France
- Keiona, winner of the second season of Drag Race France

Episode 8

- Punani, contestant on the second season of Drag Race France
- Rose, contestant on the second season of Drag Race France
- Sara Forever, runner-up on the second season of Drag Race France
- Jackie Cox, contestant on the twelfth season of RuPaul's Drag Race
- Jan, contestant on the twelfth season of RuPaul's Drag Race and the sixth season of RuPaul's Drag Race All Stars
- Moon, contestant and Miss Congeniality on the second season of Drag Race France
- Keiona, winner of the second season of Drag Race France

== Episodes ==
| No. overall | No. in season | Title | Original release date |
|---|---|---|---|
| 18 | 1 | "Voulez-Vous Drag Race Avec Moi Ce Soir?" | 31 May 2024 |
Ten queens enter the werkroom. For the first mini-challenge, the queens do a photoshoot while balancing on a mechanical surfboard. Magnetica wins the mini-challenge. For the main challenge, the queens write, record, and perform verses for a cabaret performance. On the runway, category is Made in France. Leona Winter, Magnetica, and Norma Bell receive positive critiques, with Norma Bell winning the challenge. Afrodite Amour, Edeha Noire, and Lula Strega receive negative critiques, with Lula Strega declared safe. Afrodite Amour and Edeha Noire lip-sync to "Sur le fil" by Jenifer. Edeha Noire wins the lip-sync and Afrodite Amour is the first queen to sashay away.: Guest Judges: Charles de Vilmorin and Jenifer; Mini-Challenge: Photoshoot on a mechanical surfboard; Mini-Challenge Winner: Magnetica; Main Challenge: Record and perform verses for a cabaret show; Runway Theme: Made in France; Challenge Winner: Norma Bell; Challenge Prize: A €2,500 voucher from Maison Ernest plus €1,000 and a year's subscription from Deezer; Bottom Two: Afrodite Amour and Edeha Noire; Lip-Sync Song: "Sur le fil" by Jenifer; Eliminated: Afrodite Amour; Farewell Message: "À jamais sœurs. L’amour c’est beau. ♡" ("Forever sisters. Love is beautiful. ♡")
| 19 | 2 | "Talent Show Extravaganza" | 7 June 2024 |
For this week's mini-challenge, the queens dance in a "Boom" (teen party). In each round, when the music stops the queens must find a piece of furniture to climb on top of or they are eliminated. Misty Phoenix wins the mini-challenge. For the main challenge, the queens perform in a talent show. The acts are as follows: Edeha Noire: comedic sketch; Le Filip: stand-up comedy; Leona Winter: opera singing; Lula Strega: original song lip-sync; Magnetica: live singing; Misty Phoenix: dancing; Norma Bell: original song lip-sync; Perseo: original song lip-sync; Ruby on the Nail: piano playing; On the runway, category is Couture Vivante (Living Couture). Le Filip, Leona Winter, and Perseo receive positive critiques, with Perseo winning the challenge. Magnetica, Misty Phoenix, Norma Bell, and Ruby on the Nail receive negative critiques, with Misty Phoenix and Norma Bell declared safe. Magnetica and Ruby on the Nail lip-sync to "Gigi l'amoroso" by Dalida. Ruby on the Nail wins the lip-sync and Magnetica sashays away.: Guest Judges: Guillaume Diop and Virginie Efira; Mini-Challenge: Teen dance party; Mini-Challenge Winner: Misty Phoenix; Main Challenge: Perform a talent show in front of the judges; Runway Theme: Couture Vivante (Living Couture); Challenge Winner: Perseo; Challenge Prize: €2,500 of glasses from Pontet plus €1,000 and a year's subscription from Deezer; Bottom Two: Magnetica and Ruby on the Nail; Lip-Sync Song: "Gigi l'amoroso" by Dalida; Eliminated: Magnetica; Farewell Message: "Gros love. Vous pourrez enfin être belles sans moi à côté. ¡Besos! Magnetica ♡" ("Big love. At last you’ll be able to be beautiful without me around. Kisses! Magnetica ♡")
| 20 | 3 | "Ball Games" | 14 June 2024 |
For this week's mini-challenge, the queens participate in a series of drag olympic events in teams of two. Lula Strega and Ruby on the Nail win the mini-challenge. For the main challenge, the queens showcase two looks for the Ball Games, including one constructed in the werkroom using sports equipment. On the runway, categories are Flamme Olympique (Olympic Torch) and Cérémonie d'Ouverture (Opening Ceremony). After walking the runway Nicky introduces a new twist: throughout the season the queens will occasionally be given an additional challenge when Nicky "receives" a phone call from a mystery source. This week's phone challenge requires the queens return to the werkroom and construct a headpiece to accompany their second look or to redo a headpiece they have already created. Leona Winter, Lula Strega, and Misty Phoenix receive positive critiques, with Lula Strega winning the challenge. Edeha Noire, Perseo, and Ruby on the Nail receive negative critiques, with Perseo declared safe. Edeha Noire and Ruby on the Nail lip-sync to "C'est l'amour" by Clara Luciani. Ruby on the Nail wins the lip-sync and Edeha Noire sashays away.: Guest Judges: Clara Luciani and Loïc Prigent; Mini-Challenge: Drag Olympics; Mini-Challenge Winners: Lula Strega and Ruby on the Nail; Main Challenge: Showcase two looks for the Ball Games, including one made in the werkroom; Runway Themes: Flamme Olympique (Olympic Torch) and Cérémonie d'Ouverture (Opening Ceremony); Phone Challenge: Create or redo a headpiece for the designed look; Challenge Winner: Lula Strega; Challenge Prize: A customized bag from Nona Source plus €1,000 and a year's subscription from Deezer; Bottom Two: Edeha Noire and Ruby on the Nail; Lip-Sync Song: "C'est l'amour" by Clara Luciani; Eliminated: Edeha Noire; Farewell Message: "Vous êtes ma famille à jamais. 💋 ENOIRE" ("You are my family forever. 💋 ENOIRE")
| 21 | 4 | "Céline Dion: The Rusical" | 21 June 2024 |
For this week's mini-challenge, the queens play Les Zazamours, testing their knowledge of their fellow queens. For the main challenge, the queens perform a rusical based on the life of Céline Dion. The queens' roles are as follows: Le Filip: Mommy Dion; Leona Winter: Céline (Vegas); Lula Strega: Céline (Eurovision); Misty Phoenix: Céline (Feline); Norma Bell: René; Perseo: Young Céline; Ruby on the Nail: Céline (American); On the runway, category is La Nuit des 1000 Célines (Night of 1000 Célines). The queens receive largely positive critiques and Le Filip and Leona Winter are declared the top two of the week. They lip-sync to "Pour que tu m'aimes encore" by Céline Dion. Leona Winter wins the lip-sync and therefore the challenge.: Guest Judges: Louane and Woodkid; Mini-Challenge: Les Zazamours; Mini-Challenge Winner: None; Main Challenge: Céline Dion, Le Musidrag (Céline Dion: The Rusical); Runway Theme: La Nuit des 1000 Célines (Night of 1000 Célines); Top Two: Le Filip and Leona Winter; Lip-Sync Song: "Pour que tu m'aimes encore" by Céline Dion; Challenge Winner: Leona Winter; Challenge Prize: A €2,500 voucher from Maison Ernest plus €1,000 and a year's subscription from Deezer
| 22 | 5 | "Snatch Game" | 28 June 2024 |
For this week's mini-challenge, the queens read each other to filth. Le Filip wins the mini-challenge. For the main challenge, the queens play the Snatch Game. Halfway through the challenge, Nicky receives another phone call instructing the queens to switch to a second character. The queens' characters are as follows: Le Filip as Dalida & Arielle Dombasle; Leona Winter as Ève Angeli & Armande Altaï; Lula Strega as Barbara & Chantal Goya; Misty Phoenix as Lolo Ferrari & Sylvie Tellier; Norma Bell as Cristina Córdula & Père Fouras; Perseo as La Veneno & Katy Perry; Ruby on the Nail as Jul & Isabelle Adjani; On the runway, category is Le Grand Méchant Look (The Big Bad Look). Lula Strega, Misty Phoenix, and Ruby on the Nail receive positive critiques, with Ruby on the Nail winning the challenge. Leona Winter and Perseo and receive mixed critiques and are declared safe. Le Filip and Norma Bell receive negative critiques and are the bottom two. They lip-sync to "Marcia Baïla" by Les Rita Mitsouko. Le Filip wins the lip-sync and Norma Bell sashays away.: Guest Judges: Cristina Córdula and Tahnee; Mini-Challenge: Reading is Fundamental; Mini-Challenge Winner: Le Filip; Main Challenge: Snatch Game; Phone Challenge: Switch to a second character mid-Snatch Game; Runway Theme: Le Grand Méchant Look (The Big Bad Look); Challenge Winner: Ruby on the Nail; Challenge Prize: Concert tickets from Polydor plus €1,000 and a year's subscription from Deezer; Bottom Two: Le Filip and Norma Bell; Lip-Sync Song: "Marcia Baïla" by Les Rita Mitsouko; Eliminated: Norma Bell; Farewell Message: "Continuez à rendre cette saison HISTORIQUE. Love. NB" ("Keep making this season HISTORIC. Love. NB")
| 23 | 6 | "Makeover, Ma Grande Sœur Drag" | 5 July 2024 |
For this week's mini-challenge, the queens play "Bingo Loco" a combination of bingo and twister. Perseo wins the mini-challenge. For the main challenge, the queens give drag makeovers to LGBT seniors. On the runway, category is Ma Grande Sœur Drag (My Big Drag Sister). Leona Winter, Lula Strega, and Ruby on the Nail receive positive critiques, with Ruby on the Nail winning the challenge. Le Filip receives mixed critiques and is declared safe. Misty Phoenix and Perseo receive negative critiques and are the bottom two. They lip-sync to "Hey Mama" by David Guetta ft. Nicki Minaj, Bebe Rexha, Afrojack. Misty Phoenix wins the lip-sync and Perseo sashays away.: Guest Judges: Béatrice Dalle and Meryl Bie; Mini-Challenge: Bingo Loco; Mini-Challenge Winner: Perseo; Main Challenge: Give a drag makeover to a LGBT senior; Runway Theme: Ma Grande Sœur Drag (My Big Drag Sister); Challenge Winner: Ruby on the Nail; Challenge Prize: Four bags from Ozias plus €1,000 and a year's subscription from Deezer; Bottom Two: Misty Phoenix and Perseo; Lip-Sync Song: "Hey Mama" by David Guetta ft. Nicki Minaj, Bebe Rexha, Afrojack; Eliminated: Perseo; Farewell Message: "Je vous adore, donnez tout. Mon amourch [sic] ♡ Love U" ("I adore you, give everything. My love ♡ Love U")
| 24 | 7 | "La Folle Journée Drag" | 12 July 2024 |
For this week's mini-challenge, the queens play Le Talon Faible (The Weakest Heel). Lula Strega wins the mini-challenge. For the main challenge, the queens style provided wigs to create couture hairstyles. On the runway, category is Haute Coiffure (Haute Hairstyling). After the initial runway the queens are given the first of two additional challenges from Nicky's phone: they must write and deliver a roast for Keiona's farewell party. After the roast they are given their second additional challenge: they must choreograph a group lip-sync performance to "Secouer, Secouer". For the second and final runway, category is Chevelure Couture (Hair Couture). Lula Strega and Ruby on the Nail receive positive critiques, with Lula Strega winning the challenge. Le Filip receives mixed critiques and is declared safe. Leona Winter and Misty Phoenix receive negative critiques and are the bottom two. They lip-sync to "En rouge et noir" by Jeanne Mas. Leona Winter wins the lip-sync and Misty Phoenix sashays away.: Guest Judges: Diane Kruger and Panayotis Pascot; Mini-Challenge: Le Talon Faible (The Weakest Heel); Mini-Challenge Winner: Lula Strega; Main Challenge: Style a wig to create a couture hairstyle; Runway 1 Theme: Haute Coiffure (Haute Hairstyling); Phone Challenge 1: Write and deliver a roast for Keiona's farewell party; Phone Challenge 2: Choreograph a group lip-sync performance to "Secouer, Secouer"; Runway 2 Theme: Chevelure Couture (Hair Couture); Challenge Winner: Lula Strega; Challenge Prize: A smartphone and €1,000 of photos from Lalalab plus €1,000 and a year's subscription from Deezer; Bottom Two: Leona Winter and Misty Phoenix; Lip-Sync Song: "En rouge et noir" by Jeanne Mas; Eliminated: Misty Phoenix; Farewell Message: "La plus intelligente est partie. ♡ 💋" ("The smartest one has gone. ♡ 💋")
| 25 | 8 | "Grand Finale" | 19 July 2024 |
The queens all return for the live grand finale. On the runway, category is Dragnifique (Dragnificent). The final four queens each perform to a song that was written specifically for them. Le Filip lip-syncs to "Hrvatica Baby", Lula Strega lip-syncs to "Brûle", Leona Winter lip-syncs to "Reine de Cœur", and Ruby on the Nail lip-syncs to "C'est Qui La Plus Belle?". It is announced that the final two queens are Le Filip and Ruby on the Nail, meaning Leona Winter and Lula Strega are eliminated. Norma Bell is announced as the season's Miss Congeniality. Le Filip and Ruby on the Nail then lip-sync to "I'm Alive" by Céline Dion. Le Filip is declared the winner, leaving Ruby on the Nail as the runner-up.: Finals venue: Grand Rex, Paris, France; Final Four: Le Filip, Leona Winter, Lula Strega, and Ruby on the Nail; Runway Theme: Dragnifique (Dragnificent); Eliminated: Leona Winter and Lula Strega; Miss Congeniality: Norma Bell; Final Two: Le Filip and Ruby on the Nail; Lip Sync Song: "I'm Alive" by Céline Dion; Runner-up: Ruby on the Nail; Winner of Drag Race France Season Three: Le Filip
