= Elips =

French drag performer

Elips is the stage name of Elie Méchain, a French drag performer who competed on the first seasons of Drag Race France and Drag Race France All Stars. She is based in Bordeaux.
