= Drag Race South Africa =

- Genre: Reality competition
- Based on: RuPaul's Drag Race
- Country of origin: South Africa

Production
- Camera setup: Multi-camera
- Production company: World of Wonder

Original release
- Network: WOW Presents Plus

Drag Race South Africa is an upcoming South African reality television series based on the American series RuPaul's Drag Race. It is set to air on WOW Presents Plus. The series was officially announced on October 20, 2024 by World of Wonder, the company behind the Drag Race franchise. The casting for the first season is scheduled to begin in 2025.

Drag Race South Africa is set to become the sixteenth international adaptation of the American reality competition series RuPaul's Drag Race, and the first located on the continent of Africa.
