= Lana Cotta (drag queen) =

Entertainer

Lana Cotta being crowned by Nicky Doll

Lana Cotta is a drag performer who won the fourth season of Drag Race France. She was the season's youngest contestant. She is based in Marseille.
