= Drag Race France =

French television series

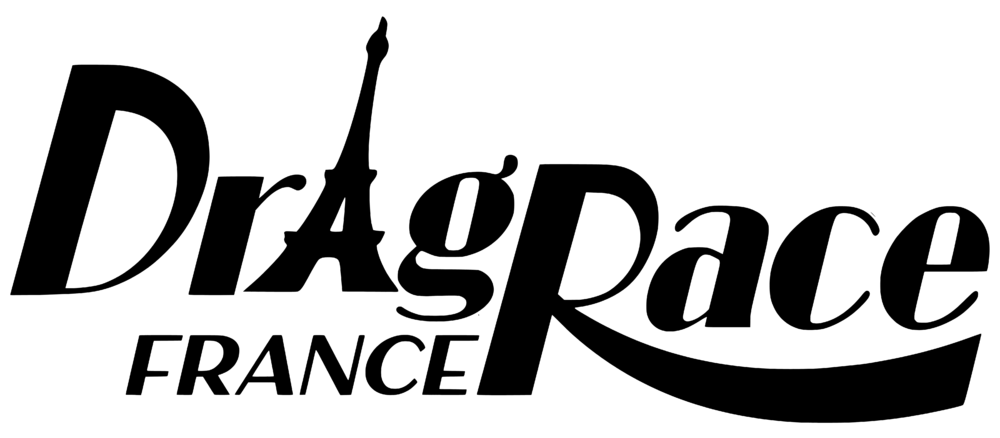
- Genre: Reality competition
- Based on: RuPaul's Drag Race
- Directed by: Lionel Chabert
- Presented by: Nicky Doll
- Judges: Nicky Doll; Daphné Bürki; Kiddy Smile; Loïc Prigent; Anggun
- Opening theme: "RuPaul's Drag Race" (theme)
- Ending theme: "I'm a Winner, Baby"
- Country of origin: France
- Original language: French
- No. of seasons: 4
- No. of episodes: 33 (list of episodes)

Production
- Executive producers: Jean-Louis Blot; Fenton Bailey; Randy Barbato; RuPaul Charles
- Camera setup: Multiple
- Production companies: Endemol France; World of Wonder

Original release
- Network: France.tv Slash (France, seasons 1–2); France 2 (France, season 3-present) (Note: For seasons 1 and 2, France.tv Slash was the main network for the show, while France 2 was airing the episodes two days after they originally premiered on France.tv Slash. From season 3 onward, France 2 became the main network, with new episodes released on the France.tv streaming service a few hour before airing on the channel, except for the season finale.); WOW Presents Plus (International)
- Release: 25 June 2022 – present

Related
- Drag Race franchise; Drag Race France All Stars

Drag Race France is a French reality competition television show part of the Drag Race franchise. Based on the original American series RuPaul's Drag Race, it is the ninth international adaptation of the show. The show is hosted by Nicky Doll, who previously competed in the twelfth season of the original American version.

The show premiered on 25 June 2022, on the digital channel France.tv Slash. For the first and second seasons, episodes premiered weekly on Thursdays and later aired on France 2 every Saturday night. Since the third season, the show moved completely to France 2, with episodes premiering every Friday, and it went back to Thursdays starting with All Stars. The show is available simultaneously on Crave in Canada, and on WOW Presents Plus internationally.

Paloma won the first season, with La Grande Dame and Soa de Muse as runners-up, while Elips was named Miss Congeniality. In August 2022, the series was renewed for a second season. Keiona won the second season. Le Filip won the third season. The series has been renewed for a fourth season.

== Production ==
=== Judges ===
The competition series is hosted and judged primarily by French drag queen, Nicky Doll, who competed in the twelfth season of RuPaul's Drag Race. French television presenter Daphné Bürki and dancer Kiddy Smile, made appearances as the competition's prominent judges.

Former and recurring judges on Drag Race France
Judges	Season			
Judges	1	2	3	4
Nicky Doll	Main	Main	Main	Main
Daphné Bürki	Main	Main	Main	Main
Kiddy Smile	Main	Main	Main	
Loïc Prigent	Guest	Guest	Guest	Main
Anggun				Main

=== Contestants ===
Since 2023, there has been a total of 30 contestants featured in Drag Race France.

== Series overview ==
Season	Contestants	Episodes	Originally released			Winner	Runner(s)-up	Miss Congeniality
Season	Contestants	Episodes	First released	Last released	Network	Winner	Runner(s)-up	Miss Congeniality
1	10	8	25 June 2022	11 August 2022	France.tv Slash	Paloma	La Grande Dame and Soa de Muse	Elips
2	11	9	30 June 2023	25 August 2023	France.tv Slash	Keiona	Sara Forever	Moon
3	10	8	31 May 2024	19 July 2024	France 2	Le Filip	Ruby on the Nail	Norma Bell
4	10	8	8 July 2026	27 August 2026	France 2	Lana Cotta	Daisy Superbitch	Margarette

=== Season 1 (2022) ===
In November 2021, the production company for RuPaul's Drag Race confirmed that a French adaptation is in the works with casting calls. In early March 2022, it was announced that French drag queen Nicky Doll, will host the French adaptation. In June 2022, Entertainment Weekly revealed the first ten contestants for its first season. The first season of Drag Race France began airing on 25 June 2022, on France.tv Slash in France and World of Wonder's streaming service WOW Presents Plus internationally. The season ran for 8 episodes and concluded on 11 August 2022. La Grande Dame and Soa de Muse made the final, and Paloma was the winner of the first season.

=== Season 2 (2023) ===
In October 2022, it was announced that France Télévisions renewed the series for a second season. A trailer for the second season was posted via social media on 10 June 2023. Eleven contestants were announced on 1 June 2023. It premiered on 30 June 2023. The season ran for 9 episodes and concluded on 25 August 2023. Mami Watta, Punani, and Sara Forever made the final, and Keiona was the winner of the second season.

=== Season 4 (2026) ===
The fourth season was officially confirmed on 14 October 2025.

== Accolades ==
Award	Year	Category	Recipient(s) and nominee(s)	Result	Ref.
Q D'or Awards	2023	Q d'or du Phénomène télé	Drag Race France	Won	

== Discography ==
List of singles
Title	Season
"Boom Boom" (Les sœurs Jacquettes) (Note: Currently unavailable) La Big Bertha, La Grande Dame, and Paloma	1
"Boom Boom" (The Nails) Elips, Lolita Banana, and Soa de Muse	1
"We Are Légendaires"	2
"Déjà Une Star" (Keiona)	2
"Moi Moi Moi" (Mami Watta)	2
"La Punanimité" (Punani)	2
"Madame Forever" (Sara Forever)	2
"Cabaret Lé-gen-daire"	3
"Secouer Secouer"	3
"Hrvatica Baby!" (Le Filip)	3
"Reine de Cœur" (Leona Winter)	3
"Brûle" (Lula Strega)	3
"C'est qui la plus belle?" (Ruby on the Nail)	3
"Belles et Fières"	4
"Parfaite" (Palace Pétasses) Fluffy Bidule, La Harpie, and Lana Cotta	4
"Hands Up" (Félinx) Azemylia, Daisy Superbitch, and Sublyme	4

== Spin-off ==
On 21 November 2024, a spin-off series Drag Race France All Stars was announced. Based on RuPaul's Drag Race All Stars, the series will follow the return of past competitors of Drag Race France.

== See also ==
- List of reality television programs with LGBTQ cast members
