= RuPaul's Drag Race: Corona Can't Keep a Good Queen Down =

2021 American documentary

- Title card
- Country of origin: United States

Original release
- Network: VH1

RuPaul's Drag Race: Corona Can't Keep a Good Queen Down is a documentary produced by World of Wonder (WoW), featuring contestants from, and the filming of, the thirteenth season of the American television series RuPaul's Drag Race. It originally aired on VH1 on February 26, 2021 and includes casting reels and interviews. It also describes measures taken during filming.

The special was announced on February 17, 2021, and aired in lieu of a regular episode. It was later available in the United Kingdom and on WoW's streaming service WOW Presents Plus.

== Reception ==
Kate Kulzick of The A.V. Club gave the episode a rating of 'C+'. Amaya Lynch included the special in Screen Rant's 2022 overview of the show's ten worst episodes, based on IMDb ratings. Lynch wrote, "While the behind-the-scenes look at the resilience of the queens and production team isn't a total waste of time, the "special episode" added more padding to an already overlong season."

== See also ==
- Impact of the COVID-19 pandemic on television
  - Impact of the COVID-19 pandemic on television in the United States
- Impact of the COVID-19 pandemic on the LGBTQ community
