= Soa de Muse =

French drag performer

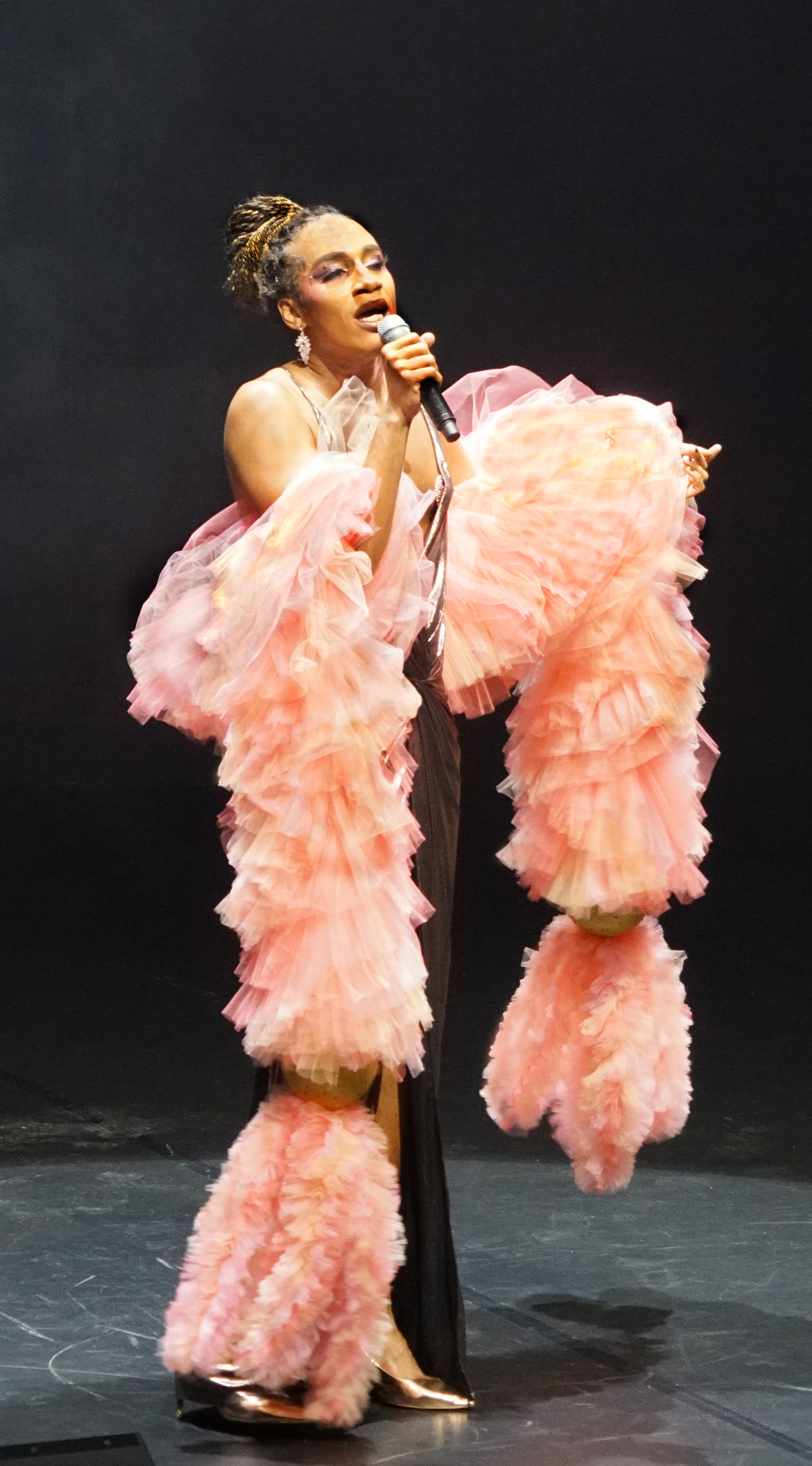
- Soa at the Musée du Quai Branly in 2022
- Born: January 31, 1989 (age 37); Villepinte, Seine-Saint-Denis, Paris, France
- Occupation: Drag queen
- Television: Drag Race France; RuPaul's Drag Race Global All Stars; Drag Race France All Stars

Soa de Muse (born January 31, 1989) is a French drag performer best known for participating in the first season of Drag Race France, the first season of RuPaul's Drag Race Global All Stars, and the first season of Drag Race France All Stars.

== Early life ==
Soa de Muse was born in Villepinte, Seine-Saint-Denis, a suburb of Paris, France. At the age of 15, de Muse moved to Martinique with their parents, where they remained through their high school years, and first discovered a love for theater.

At the age of 20, Soa returned to continental France to study, at their parents' urging. They initially pursued a degree in literature, then switched to theater studies. It was during the latter program that de Muse decided to pursue performance full time, and ultimately terminated her studies: "I realized that I shouldn't be sitting, listening to someone talking ... I had to do the scene [myself]." Eventually, she was introduced to the art of drag through RuPaul's Drag Race.

== Career ==
Before appearing on Drag Race France, Soa worked as a burlesque performer at Madame Arthur, a historic Parisian drag venue open since 1946.

In March 2021, Soa participated in the "109 Mariannes" exhibition, curated by France's then-Secretary of State for Gender Equality, Marlène Schiappa, to mark International Women's Rights Day. Portraits of de Muse, and 108 other participants selected to "celebrate the diversity of France" in the image of national symbol Marianne, were displayed in front of the Panthéon for one week.

Soa de Muse competed on the inaugural season of Drag Race France, a spin-off franchise of the original series RuPaul's Drag Race. Soa was the first challenge winner of the series in the episode "Bonjour, Bonjour, Bonjour."

Elsewhere in 2022, Soa opened their own cabaret in Paris, called "La Bouche", in collaboration with three other local performers.

== Public image and artistry ==
Soa's drag is heavily inspired by their Afro-Martinican culture. During their time on Drag Race France, Soa shared a desire to highlight "the West Indian community which is a little invisible" as well as contribute "a battle cry to say that we are here now." They have also stated a desire to some day return to perform in their native Martinique.

== Personal life ==
Soa de Muse is non-binary, having stated in a 2021 interview that they identify with "neither man nor woman, just universelle. I just am who I am."

Soa is a drag sister of Honey Mahogany, a San Francisco-based drag performer, activist and competitor in RuPaul's Drag Race season 5, through their shared drag mother Alotta Boutté — a connection that both queens discovered via Instagram comments.

== Discography ==
=== Singles ===
==== As a featured artist ====
Title	Year	Album	Ref.
"Boom Boom (The Nails)" with Drag Race France, season 1 (Lolita Banana and Elips)	2022	—N/a	
"Everybody Say Love (D'Vybe Latinx Mix)" (The Cast of RuPaul's Drag Race Global All Stars)	2024	Non-album single	

== Filmography ==
=== Film ===
Year	Title	Role	Director	Ref
2021	Panorama	Memory	Gerard & Kely	
2017	The Ladies Almanack	Arthur Cravan	Daviel Shy	

=== Television ===
Year	Title	Role	Notes	Ref
2023	The Drag Race France Phenomenon: One Year with the Queens	Self	France 2 documentary	
2022	Drag Race France	Self	Runner-up (Season 1); Special guest (Season 2)	
2022	Queen	Drag Queen		
2024	RuPaul's Drag Race Global All Stars	Self	9th place, Miss Congeniality, Lip Sync Assassin	

- Drag Race France All Stars (2025)

=== Web series ===
Year	Title	Role	Notes	Ref
2022	Tea Time par Tinder x Drag Race - Episode 6 - La Big Bertha et Soa de Muse	Self	Guest with La Big Bertha	
2022	Tea Time par Tinder x Drag Race - Episode 2 - La Briochée et Soa de Muse	Self	Guest with La Briochée	
