= Mami Watta =

Ivorian-French drag performer

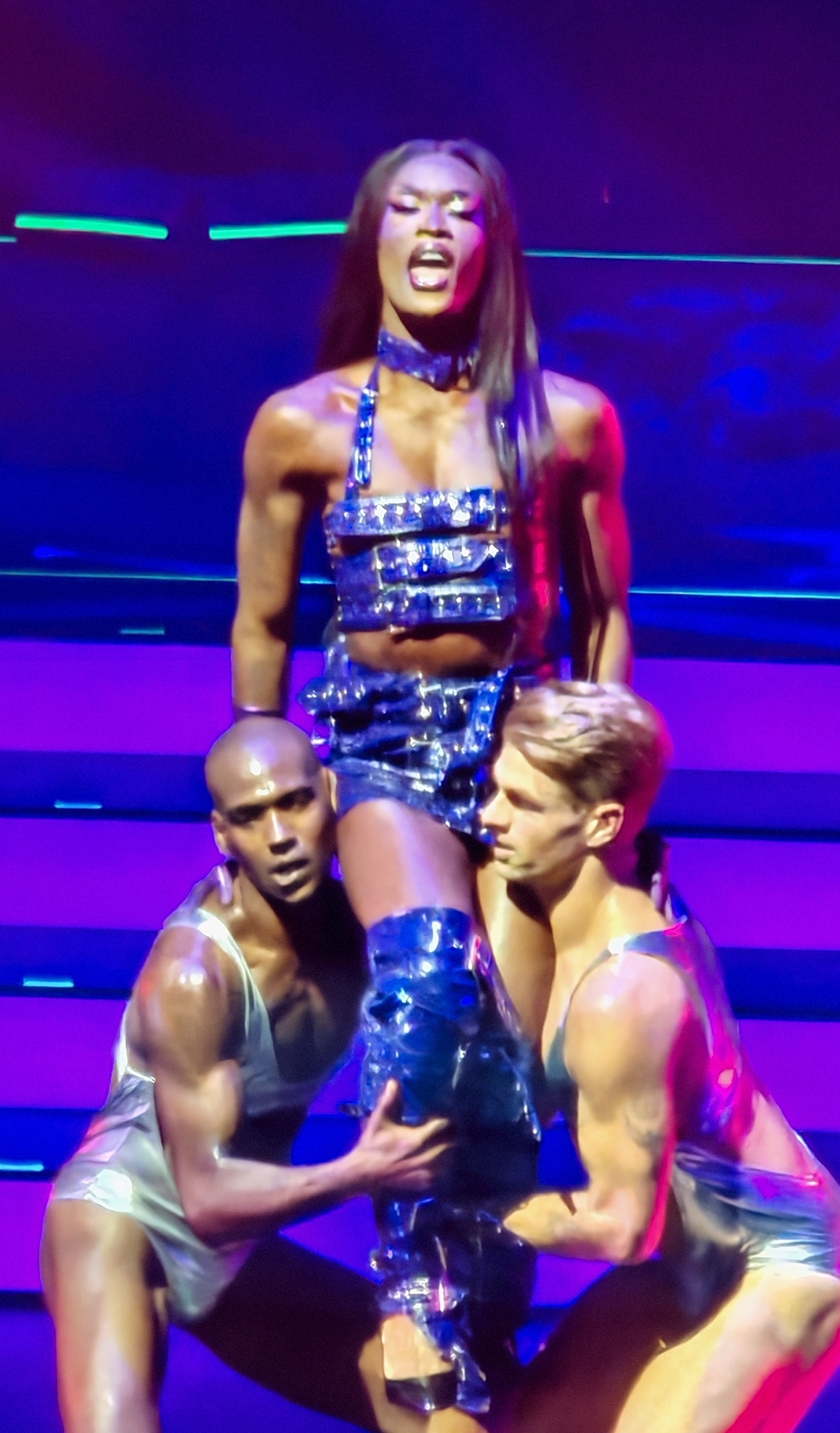
- Mami Watta in 2023
- Born: William Pedia; Abidjan, Ivory Coast
- Occupation: Drag queen
- Television: Drag Race France (season 2)

Mami Watta is the stage name of William Pedia, an Ivorian drag performer based in France who competed on the second season of Drag Race France and won the first season of Drag Race France All Stars.

== Biography ==
Born into a Catholic family in Abidjan, Mami Watta was bullied at school for her effeminate ways. Inspired by RuPaul's Drag Race, she began applying make-up in secret, alone in her bathroom, and erased her work before leaving the room. She came out as gay in 2018, while studying for her law degree, and her visibility stood out in Abidjan's queer community, which is more accustomed to discretion to preserve its security.

In August 2019, she left the Ivory Coast and moved to Bordeaux to live her identity more freely, after her mother forced her to undergo conversion therapy. Faced with the isolation she encountered there, she moved to Saint-Denis, Seine-Saint-Denis. Once in the Paris region, she joined the ball culture scene at the House of Ladurée and began her career as a drag queen. She stopped her studies after obtaining a Master 2 in order to devote herself fully to drag.

== Personal life ==
As of 2023 she was based in Saint-Denis, Seine-Saint-Denis, a commune in northern Paris.

== Filmography ==
- Drag Race France (2023) : 3rd place
- Drag Race France All Stars (2025) : Winner
