= Paloma (drag queen) =

French drag performer (born 1991)

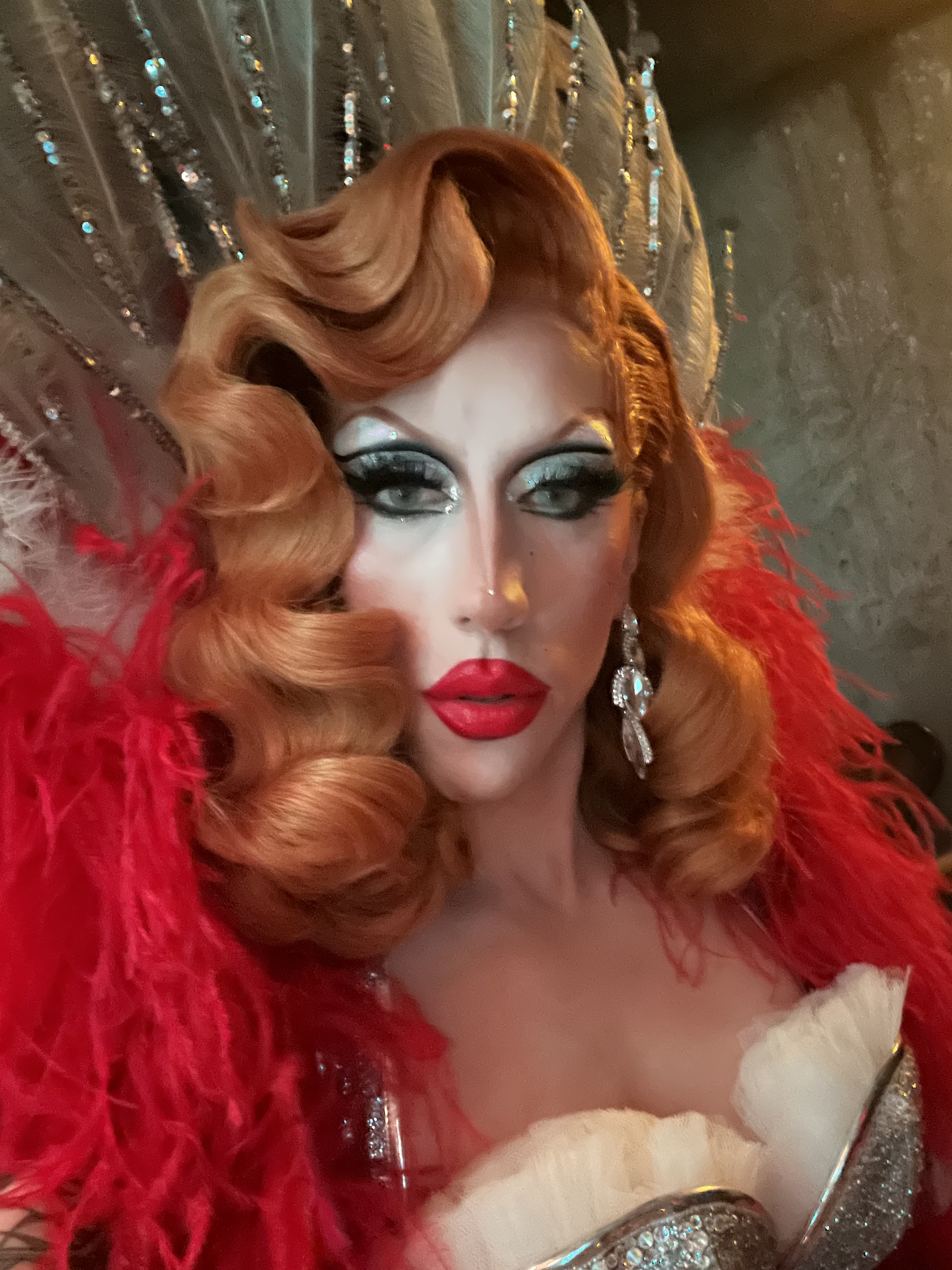
- Born: Hugo Jean Pierre Bardin; June 30, 1991 (age 35); Clermont-Ferrand, France
- Occupations: Drag queen; singer; director; screenwriter
- Television: Drag Race France
- Musical career
- Genre: Pop
- Instrument: Vocals

Hugo Jean Pierre Bardin (born June 30, 1991), known professionally as Paloma, is a French drag performer, singer, director and screenwriter. Paloma is best known for winning the first season of Drag Race France.

== Early life ==
Hugo Bardin was born on June 30, 1991. He took his first theater lessons at the age of four, which gave rise to his desire to work in this field. After the baccalaureate, which he obtained in Clermont-Ferrand, his hometown, he continued his studies at Cours Florent, in Paris. During this time, he exercised several professions in the field of theatre, in particular an actor, but also a director or a wigmaker.

== Career ==
Bardin's first experience as a drag queen dates back to 2008, in a staging of the play titled Nur eine Scheibe Brot by Rainer Werner Fassbinder, performed at the Comédie de Clermont-Ferrand. However, Bardin did not immediately continue in the field of drag performance professionally, instead favoring his career as an actor. During this period, Bardin felt compelled to "be more masculine," to obtain better success in his auditions. Conversely, performing in drag offered him an opportunity to "be whoever I want, kind of like a superhero," which ultimately inspired Bardin to pursue drag more seriously.

In 2018, Bardin debuted the character of Paloma. The Spanish-sounding first name was inspired by the cinema of Pedro Almodóvar and recalls Paloma Picasso. In 2022, Paloma's eponymous short film, directed by herself, and was released at festivals. On June 2, 2022, Paloma was announced as one of the ten candidates participating in the first season of Drag Race France. At the end of the finale, Paloma won against Soa de Muse and La Grande Dame.

In 2024, Bardin served on the jury for the Queer Palm award at the 2024 Cannes Film Festival.

== Discography ==
=== Singles ===
==== As a lead artist ====
Title	Year	Album	Ref.
"Love, l'artère" (with Marc Bret-Vittoz)	2022	—N/a	
"P.A.L.O.M.A" (with Rebeka Warrior & RAUMM)	2024	—N/a	
"Poison" (with Elips)	2025	Château intérieur	

==== As a featured artist ====
Title	Year	Album	Ref.
"Boom Boom (Les Sœurs Jacquettes)" with Drag Race France Cast (season 1) (La Big Bertha and La Grande Dame)	2022	—N/a	

=== Albums ===
Title	Year	Ref.
"Château intérieur"	2025	

== Filmography ==
=== Television ===
Year	Title	Role	Notes	Ref.
2022–23	Drag Race France	Herself/Contestant	Winner (Season 1); Special guest (Season 2)	
2022–23	Une si longue nuit	Stéphanie	TV series (1 episode)	
2022–23	La boîte à secrets	Herself	Performer with Soa de Muse and Elips	
2022–23	C l'hebdo	Herself	Guest	
2022–23	Quotidien	Herself	Guest	
2023	Balthazar	Paloma	TV series (4 episodes)	
2023	The Drag Race France Phenomenon: One Year with the Queens	Herself	France 2 documentary	
2023	Drama queen chez Paloma	Herself	Host	
2023–24	The Walking Dead: Daryl Dixon	Coco	TV series (2 episodes)	

=== Web series ===
Year	Title	Role	Notes	Ref.
2022	Le Parisien	Herself	Guest, digital podcast	
2022	Tea Time	Herself	Guest with La Briochée, and Kam Hugh, by Tinder France	
2022	La Boîte à Questions	Herself	Guest	
2022	France Inter	Herself	Guest; podcast	
2023	Drag & the City	Herself	Guest	

=== Short film ===
Year	Title	Role	Notes	Ref.
2012	14 Septembre	Foxy		
2013	Seul ensemble			
2015	Tohu Bohu	Stan		
2022	Paloma	Paloma	Self-directed and written	

== Theater ==
Year	Title	Notes
2023–24	Paloma au plurielles	One-woman show
