= Le Filip =

Croatian drag queen

- Le Filip at Paris Pride 2026
- Born: Filip Mrzljak; 1993 or 1994 (age 31–32); Zagreb, Croatia
- Occupation: Drag queen
- Television: Drag Race France (season 3)

Filip Mrzljak, better known by the stage name Le Filip, is a Croatian drag queen best known for winning the third season of Drag Race France.

== Early and personal life ==
Le Filip was born in Zagreb, Croatia. According to Telegram, she comes from a Zagreb family of respected diplomats. She first moved to Paris with her mother when she was 12 years old.

As of 2024, she was based in Paris.

== Career ==
Le Filip started doing drag at Zagreb Pride in 2012 when she was 18 years old. She was an associate member of House of Flamingo, a Croatian queer and drag performance arts ensemble from Zagreb. In France, she was a member of Haus of Morue. Le Filip describes herself as a comedy queen and cites feminine personalities of Pamela Anderson, Anne Roumanoff, Élie Semoun, Florence Foresti and Jacques Tati as her inspirations.

On 24 April 2024, Le Filip was announced as one of ten contestants of the third season of Drag Race France, becoming the first contestant in the Drag Race franchise to be of a Croatian origin. During her time on the season, Le Filip placed in the Top 2 on the fourth episode, in a Rusical dedicated to Céline Dion, ultimately losing a lipsync to Leona Winter. Le Filip was one of the four finalists of the season, along with Leona Winter, Lula Strega and Ruby on the Nail. At the finale, Le Filip performed an original song titled "Hrvatica Baby!", won the final lipsync against Ruby on the Nail, and was ultimately crowned the winner of the season receiving the title of France's Next Drag Superstar. Le Filip is thus the second winner in the Drag Race franchise to never win a Maxi challenge, following Drag Race Italia's Elecktra Bionic.

== Filmography ==
=== Television ===
Year	Title	Role	Notes	Ref.
2024	Drag Race France	Herself (contestant)	Season 3, Winner	
2025	Drag Race France All Stars	Herself (guest)	Season 1	

== Discography ==
=== Promotional singles ===
List of promotional singles, showing year released, chart positions, certifications and album name
Title	Year	Album
"Cabaret Lé-gen-daire" (as part of the Cast of Drag Race France)	2024	Non-album singles
"Hrvatica Baby!" (Le Filip) (as part of the Cast of Drag Race France)	2024	Non-album singles
