= Kiddy Smile =

French dancer and DJ

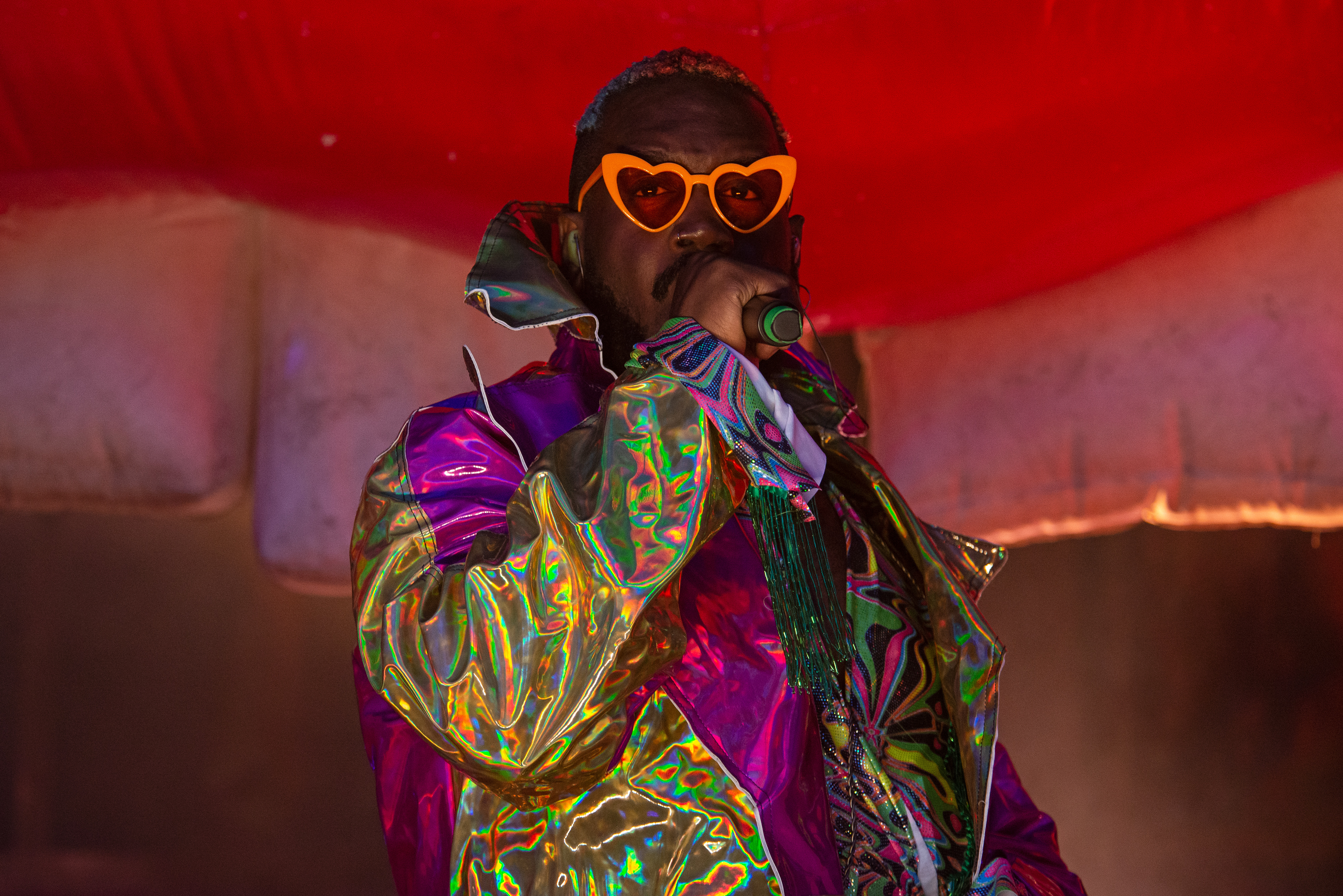
- Kiddy Smile in 2019

Background information
- Also known as: Keehdi Mizrahi
- Born: Pierre-Édouard Hanffou; 10 April 1983 (age 43)
- Origin: Rambouillet, Île-de-France, France
- Genres: electronic; club; house
- Occupations: Disc jockey; record producer; singer; dancer; activist
- Years active: 2010–present
- Labels: Never Beener Records; Defected Records

Pierre-Édouard Hanffou (French pronunciation: [pjɛʁ edwaʁ ɑ̃fu]; born 10 April 1983), known by his stage name Kiddy Smile, is a French DJ, music producer, dancer, television personality and LGBT+ rights activist.

== Career ==
In March 2022, he was announced as a regular panelist of the upcoming series Drag Race France.

In October of 2010, Smile appeared as the performer of the Just Dance 2 & Just Dance Summer Party song "Skin To Skin" by Hermann Langschwert.

== Filmography ==
=== Film ===
- Climax - Daddy

=== Television ===
- Drag Race France - Himself (regular judge)

== Accolades ==
Award	Year	Category	Recipient(s) and nominee(s)	Result	Ref.
La Cérémonie des Têtu 2023	2023	Prix des Lecteurs	Herself	Pending	
