= Loïc Prigent =

French fashion journalist

Loïc Prigent is a fashion journalist and director. He is a judge on Drag Race France.
