= Daphné Bürki =

French television presenter and columnist

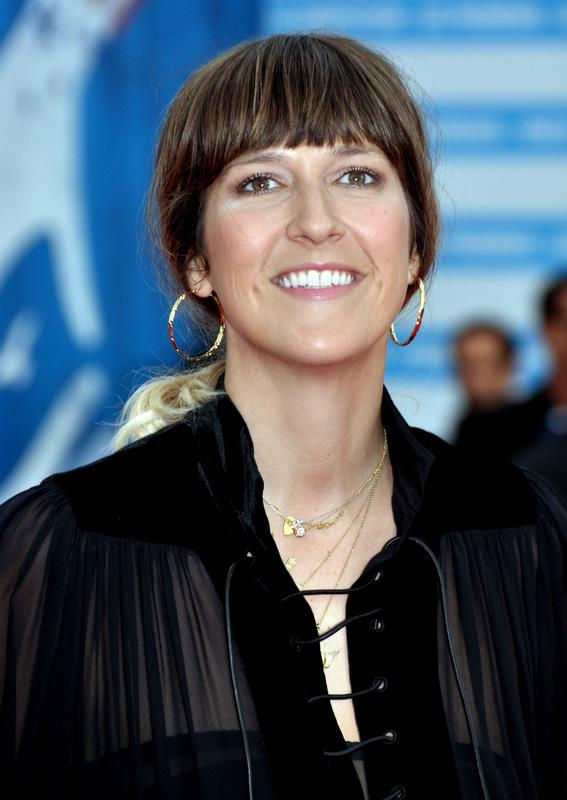
- Daphne Bürki in 2012 at the Deauville American Film Festival
- Born: Daphné de Montmarin; February 3, 1980 (age 46); Paris, France
- Occupations: Television presenter, columnist, stylist, actress

Daphné Bürki (born Daphné de Montmarin, 2 March 1980 in Paris) is a French television presenter, columnist, stylist, and actress. She currently appears as one of the main judges on the competition series Drag Race France.

She was chosen by the Organizing Committee for the 2024 Summer Olympics and 2024 Summer Paralympics as “styling and costumes” director for the four Paris 2024 ceremonies, in particular the 2024 Summer Olympics opening ceremony, working with Thomas Jolly and Victor Le Masne. She presented the opening ceremony live with Laurent Delahousse on France 2.

== Personal life ==
Bürki is bisexual.

== Filmography ==
=== Cinema ===
- 2008: Love Me No More, directed by Jean Becker : Bérengère
- 2010: Un heureux événement, directed by Rémi Bezançon : Katia
- 2012: David et Madame Hansen, directed by Alexandre Astier : Perrine
- 2014: Les Yeux jaunes des crocodiles, directed by Cécile Telerman : elle-même

=== Television ===
- 2022-present : Drag Race France
- 2022 : Chair tendre : Cécile Dalca
- 2024 : 2024 Summer Olympics opening ceremony
- 2025 : 2be3 : Salomé
