= La Más Draga season 6 =

Sixth season of La Más Draga

La Más Draga
- Season 6
- Promotional poster for season six
- Hosted by: Marisol González
- Judges: Yari Mejía; Bernardo "Letal" Vázquez; Raquel Martínez
- No. of contestants: 14
- Winner: Cattriona
- Runners-up: Aries; Electra Walpurgis; Juana Guadalupe
- No. of episodes: 11

Release
- Original network: YouTube
- Original release: 12 September – 28 November 2023

Season chronology
- ← Previous; Season 5 Next → Season 7

The sixth season of La Más Draga aired on 12 September 2023, is available through YouTube, and is produced by La Gran Diabla Producciones. The series features fourteen contestants from all over Mexico competing for the title of La Más Draga of Mexico and Latin America and a cash prize of $600,000 MXN Pesos. The winner of the sixth season of La Más Draga was Cattriona, with Aries, Electra Walpurgis and Juana Guadalupe as runners-up.

The judges panel of this season include Mexican TV personality and beauty pageant titleholder Marisol González, who is also the main host, hair and makeup artist Yari Mejía, drag performer Bernardo "Letal" Vázquez, and Spanish actress and dancer Raquel Martínez.

Similarly to the fourth and fifth season, thirty-four drag performers from the audition tapes were selected and asked to perform in a Live Audition held in Mexico City. However, one contestant (Aries) was singled out and confirmed to be cast even before the live auditions. The live auditions was broadcast on 14 March 2023, with three contestants confirmed to be cast by the judges and public vote (Ank Cosart, Cattriona, and Juana Guadalupe). The final contestants were announced on 30 August 2023.

== Contestants ==
Ages, names, and cities stated are at time of filming.

Contestants of La Más Draga season 6 and their backgrounds
| Contestant | Age | Hometown | Outcome |
|---|---|---|---|
| Cattriona (Note: Cattriona Biñé is referred to as Cattriona on the show.) | 21 | Mérida, Yucatán | Winner |
| Aries | 30 | Morelia, Michoacán (Note: Aries is listed as being from both Morelia, Michoacán and Mexico City on the show.) | Runners-up |
| Electra Walpurgis | 25 | Xalapa, Veracruz | Runners-up |
| Juana Guadalupe (Note: Juana Guadalupe De Jesús is referred to as Juana Guadalupe on the show.) | 30 | Los Altos de Jalisco, Jalisco | Runners-up |
| Kelly (Note: Kelly Caracas is referred to as Kelly on the show.) | 23 | Orizaba, Veracruz | 5th place (Note: La Kyliezz was voted La Más Querida.) |
| La Kyliezz (Note: La Kyliezz Kazzandra Ponce de León is referred to as La Kyliezz on the show.) | 31 | Monterrey, Nuevo León | 5th place |
| Dimittra | 24 | San Cristóbal, Venezuela (Note: Dimittra is listed as being from both San Cristóbal, Venezuela and Mazatlán, Sinaloa on the show.) | 7th place |
| Shantelle | 22 | Monterrey, Nuevo León | 8th place |
| Ariel | 25 | Puerto Vallarta, Jalisco | 9th place |
| Alexis Mvgler | 30 | Río Bravo, Tamaulipas | 10th place |
| Purga | 20 | Puebla, Puebla | 11th place |
| Braulio 8000 | 25 | Cuernavaca, Morelos | 12th place |
| Ank Cosart | 33 | San Luis, Argentina | 13th place |
| Mizz Peaches | 28 | Puerto Vallarta, Jalisco | 13th place |

== Contestant progress ==
Legend:

Cattriona won Las Más Draga season 6.
Aries, Electra Walpurgis and Juana Guadalupe were the runners-up.
La Kyliezz was voted La Más Querida (LMQ).
WIN indicates that the contestant received the highest score and won the challenge.
SAFE indicates that the contestant was declared safe by the judges.
IMM (Immunity) indicates that the contestant was immune for the episode.
BTM (Bottom) indicates that the contestant received one of the lowest scores and was up for elimination.
ELIM (Eliminated) indicates that the contestant received one of the lowest scores and was eliminated.
Guest indicates that the contestant returned as a guest.

Contestants progress with placements in each episode
| Contestant | Episode | | | | | | | | | | | |
| Contestant | 1 | 2 | 3 | 4 | 5 | 6 | 7 | 8 | 9 | 10 | 11 | 12 |
|---|---|---|---|---|---|---|---|---|---|---|---|---|
| Cattriona | SAFE | IMM | SAFE | WIN | SAFE | SAFE | BTM | WIN | SAFE | SAFE | Guest | Winner |
| Aries | SAFE | WIN | SAFE | WIN | SAFE | WIN | SAFE | SAFE | SAFE | SAFE | Guest | Runner-up |
| Electra Walpurgis | SAFE | SAFE | SAFE | SAFE | SAFE | SAFE | SAFE | SAFE | WIN | WIN | Guest | Runner-up |
| Juana Guadalupe | SAFE | SAFE | WIN | SAFE | WIN | SAFE | WIN | SAFE | SAFE | SAFE | Guest | Runner-up |
| Kelly | WIN | IMM | SAFE | SAFE | SAFE | BTM | SAFE | BTM | BTM | ELIM | Guest | Guest |
| La Kyliezz | SAFE | SAFE | SAFE | BTM | BTM | SAFE | SAFE | SAFE | IMM | ELIM | Guest | LMQ |
| Dimittra | SAFE | IMM | SAFE | SAFE | SAFE | SAFE | SAFE | IMM | ELIM | | Guest | Guest |
| Shantelle | SAFE | SAFE | SAFE | SAFE | SAFE | BTM | SAFE | ELIM | | | Guest | Guest |
| Ariel | SAFE | IMM | SAFE | WIN | SAFE | SAFE | ELIM | | | | Guest | Guest |
| Alexis Mvgler | SAFE | SAFE | SAFE | SAFE | IMM | ELIM | | | | | Guest | Guest |
| Purga | SAFE | SAFE | BTM | BTM | ELIM | | | | | | Guest | Guest |
| Braulio 8000 | SAFE | SAFE | ELIM | | | | | | | | Guest | Guest |
| Ank Cosart | BTM | ELIM | | | | | | | | | Guest | Guest |
| Mizz Peaches | BTM | ELIM | | | | | | | | | Guest | Guest |

=== Scores history ===
Summary of weekly voting and results
| Contestant | Episode | | | | | | | | | Total |
| Contestant | 1 | 2 | 3 | 4 | 5 | 6 | 7 | 8 | 9 | Total |
|---|---|---|---|---|---|---|---|---|---|---|
| Cattriona | 17 | 15 | 14 | 20 | 16 | 18 | 13 | 19 | 20 | 152 |
| Aries | 18 | 19 | 17 | 20 | 18 | 19 | 14 | 18 | 18 | 161 |
| Electra | 19 | 18 | 19 | 18 | 16 | 14 | 16 | 18 | 21 | 159 |
| Juana | 19 | 16 | 20 | 15 | 20 | 17 | 19 | 16 | 19 | 161 |
| Kelly | 20 | 16 | 16 | 17 | 17 | 8 | 15 | 8 | 15 | 132 |
| La Kyliezz | 15 | 12 | 13 | 8 | 12 | 15 | 17 | 17 | 12 | 121 |
| Dimittra | 10 | 15 | 17 | 17 | 14 | 17 | 18 | 12 | 11 | 131 |
| Shantelle | 16 | 13 | 18 | 15 | 18 | 10 | 16 | 15 | | 121 |
| Ariel | 15 | 10 | 16 | 20 | 19 | 18 | 13 | | | 111 |
| Alexis | 12 | 14 | 15 | 18 | 10 | 8 | | | | 77 |
| Purga | 16 | 14 | 12 | 8 | 15 | | | | | 65 |
| Braulio | 12 | 17 | 12 | | | | | | | 41 |
| Ank | 16 | 11 | | | | | | | | 27 |
| Mizz Peaches | 8 | 8 | | | | | | | | 16 |

== Lip syncs ==
Legend:

The contestant was eliminated after their first time in the bottom.
The contestant was eliminated after their second time in the bottom.
The contestant was eliminated after their third time in the bottom.
The contestant was eliminated after their fourth time in the bottom.

| Episode | Contestants | | | Song | Eliminated |
|---|---|---|---|---|---|
| 2 | Ank Cosart | vs. | Mizz Peaches | "En la obscuridad" (Belinda) | Ank Cosart |
| 2 | Ank Cosart | vs. | Mizz Peaches | "En la obscuridad" (Belinda) | Mizz Peaches |
| 3 | Braulio 8000 | vs. | Purga | "20 segundos" (Gloria Trevi) | Braulio 8000 |
| 4 | La Kyliezz | vs. | Purga | "Tu dama de hierro" (Marisela) | None |
| 5 | La Kyliezz | vs. | Purga | "Flores" (Kenia Os) | Purga |
| 6 | Alexis Mvgler vs. Kelly vs. Shantelle | | | "Mermelada" (Mariana Seoane) | Alexis Mvgler |
| 7 | Ariel | vs. | Cattriona | "Yo te diré" (Miranda!, Lali) | Ariel |
| 8 | Kelly | vs. | Shantelle | "Azúcar amargo" (Fey) | Shantelle |
| 9 | Dimittra | vs. | Kelly | "La chapa que vibran" (La Materialista) | Dimittra |
| 10 (Note: All the contestants had to lip-sync to make it to the finale even though no one was in the bottom.) | Electra Walpurgis | vs. | Juana Guadalupe | "Disciplina" (Lali) | None |
| 10 | Cattriona | vs. | La Kyliezz | "SloMo" (Chanel) | La Kyliezz |
| 10 | Aries | vs. | Kelly | "El Anillo" (Jennifer Lopez) | Kelly |

== Judges ==
=== Main judges ===
- Yari Mejía, designer, stylist, singer and model
- Bernardo "Letal" Vázquez, drag queen and professional makeup artist
- Raquel Martínez, actress and dancer

=== Guest judges ===
Listed in chronological order.

- Susana Zabaleta, soprano and actress
- Belinda, singer and actress
- Ari Gameplays, internet celebrity
- Faisy, actor and television host
- Consuelo Duval, actress and comedian
- Daniela Magun, actress and member of Kabah
- Miranda!, Argentinian musical duo
- Fey, singer, designer and director
- Karely Ruiz, model and Social Media personality
- Diego Cardenas, internet celebrity
- Jorge Anzaldo, internet celebrity
- Vanessa Labios 4K, internet celebrity

=== Special guests ===
Guests who will appear in episodes, but not judge on the main stage.

Episode 1

- Alex Córdova, photographer

Episode 6

- Kenya Cuevas Fuentes, activist

Episode 7

- Yeyoncé Maldonado, dancer, choreographer and director
- Eilehx, record producer

Episode 9

- Las Standuperras, cabaret collective

Episode 12

- Alejandra Bogue, actress, comedian, television host and vedette
- Fifí Estah, winner of La Más Draga season 5
- Huma Kyle, contestant and La Más Querida on La Más Draga season 5
- La Carrera, contestant on La Más Draga season 4

== Episodes ==
| No. overall | No. in season | Title | Original release date |
|---|---|---|---|
| 52 | 1 | "La Más Monumental" | 12 September 2023 |
Fourteen drag queens enter the workroom. For the first mini-challenge, the queens will do a photoshoot hanging from a trapeze. Electra Walpurgis wins the mini-challenge. Ank Cosart is named as the worst in the mini-challenge, and is automatically up for elimination. For the main challenge, the queens will present a look inspired by Mexican monuments. The Mexican monuments inspirations were as follows: Alexis Mvgler - Monumento al Papa Juan Pablo II (Monument to Pope John Paul II); Ank Cosart - Catedral Metropolitana de la CDMX and Templo Mayor de Tenochtitlán (Mexico City Metropolitan Cathedral and Main Temple of Tenochtitlán); Ariel - La Minerva (Statue of Minerva, Guadalajara); Aries - Guerrero Chimalli (Shield Warrior); Braulio 8000 - Monumento a la Madre (Mother's Monument); Cattriona - Monumento a la Patria (Monument to the Fatherland); Dimittra - Biblioteca Central de la UNAM (UNAM Central Library); Electra Walpurgis - Monumento a Cristóbal Colón and Monumento a los Indios Verdes (Monument to Christopher Columbus and Monument to the Green Indians); Juana Guadalupe - Glorieta de los Caballos (Horses Roundabout); Kelly - Ángel de la Independencia (Angel of Independence); La Kyliezz - Fuente de la Diana Cazadora (Diana the Huntress Fountain); Mizz Peaches - Mural Playas de Tijuana (Beaches of Tijuana Mural); Purga - Biblioteca Palafoxiana (Palafoxiana Library); Shantelle - Fuente de Neptuno (Fountain of Neptune); On the runway, category is La Más Monumental (The Most Monumental). Electra Walpurgis, Juana Guadalupe and Kelly receive positive critiques, with Kelly winning the challenge. Dimittra and Mizz Peaches receive negative critiques. However, as Ank Cosart was put up for elimination due to losing the mini-challenge, she replaced Dimittra in the bottom. Before Ank Cosart and Mizz Peaches lip-sync, Susana Zabaleta stops the lip-sync, and saves both queens from elimination.: Guest Judge: Susana Zabaleta; Mini-Challenge: Photoshoot hanging from a trapeze; Mini-Challenge Winner: Electra Walpurgis; Mini-Challenge Prize: 3 extra stars added to their final challenge score; Mini-Challenge Loser: Ank Cosart; Main Challenge: Present a look inspired by Mexican monuments; Runway Theme: La Más Monumental (The Most Monumental); Challenge Winner: Kelly; Challenge Prize: A $5,000 cash tip; Bottom Two: Ank Cosart and Mizz Peaches; Lip-Sync Song: None; Eliminated: None
| 53 | 2 | "La Más Frida" | 19 September 2023 |
For this week's mini-challenge, the queens will team up and recreate iconic scenes from the reality show Rica, Famosa, Latina. Ariel, Aries, Cattriona, Dimittra and Kelly win the mini-challenge, and earn immunity from elimination this episode. For the main challenge, the queens will present a look inspired by the works and life of Mexican painter Frida Kahlo. On the runway, category is La Más Frida (The Most Frida). Aries, Braulio 8000 and Electra Walpurgis receive positive critiques, with Aries winning the challenge. Ank Cosart, La Kyliezz and Mizz Peaches receive negative critiques, with La Kyliezz being safe. Ank Cosart and Mizz Peaches lip-sync to "En la obscuridad" by Belinda. After the lip-sync, the judges decide that both queens should be eliminated, meaning both Ank Cosart and Mizz Peaches sashay away.: Guest Judge: Belinda; Mini-Challenge: In teams, recreate iconic scenes from the reality show Rica, Famosa, Latina; Mini-Challenge Winners: Ariel, Aries, Cattriona, Dimittra and Kelly; Mini-Challenge Prize: Immunity from elimination; Main Challenge: Present a look inspired by the works and life of Mexican painter Frida Kahlo; Runway Theme: La Más Frida (The Most Frida); Challenge Winner: Aries; Challenge Prize: A $5,000 cash tip; Bottom Two: Ank Cosart and Mizz Peaches; Lip-Sync Song: "En la obscuridad" by Belinda; Eliminated: Ank Cosart and Mizz Peaches
| 54 | 3 | "La Más Picada" | 26 September 2023 |
For this week's mini-challenge, the queens will have to fight in a pool of mud for the immunity lipstick. Alexis Mvgler wins the mini-challenge, and won the immunity lipstick, which she can use at any time during the competition. For the main challenge, the queens will present a look featuring papel picado, a traditional Mexican decorative craft. On the runway, category is La Más Picada (The Most Pecked). Electra Walpurgis, Juana Guadalupe and Shantelle receive positive critiques, with Juana Guadalupe winning the challenge. Braulio 8000, La Kyliezz and Purga receive negative critiques, with La Kyliezz being safe. Braulio 8000 and Purga lip-sync to "20 segundos" by Gloria Trevi. Purga wins the lip-sync and Braulio 8000 sashays away.: Guest Judge: Ari Gameplays; Mini-Challenge: Fight in a pool of mud for the immunity lipstick; Mini-Challenge Winner: Alexis Mvgler; Mini-Challenge Prize: Immunity Lipstick; Main Challenge: Present a look featuring papel picado, a traditional Mexican decorative craft; Runway Theme: La Más Picada (The Most Pecked); Challenge Winner: Juana Guadalupe; Challenge Prize: A $5,000 cash tip; Bottom Two: Braulio 8000 and Purga; Lip-Sync Song: "20 segundos" by Gloria Trevi; Eliminated: Braulio 8000
| 55 | 4 | "La Más Recursiva" | 3 October 2023 |
For this week's main challenge, the queens will team up and present a set of cohesive looks using Jerga, a coarse woolen fabric popular in Mexico. The teams were as follows: Alexis Mvgler and Electra Walpurgis; Ariel, Aries and Cattriona; Dimittra and Kelly; Juana Guadalupe and Shantelle; La Kyliezz and Purga; On the runway, category is La Más Recursiva (The Most Resourceful). Alexis Mvgler, Ariel, Aries, Cattriona and Electra Walpurgis receive positive critiques, with Ariel, Aries and Cattriona all winning the challenge. Juana Guadalupe, La Kyliezz, Purga and Shantelle receive negative critiques, with Juana Guadalupe and Shantelle being safe. La Kyliezz and Purga lip-sync to "Tu dama de hierro" by Marisela. La Kyliezz wins the lip-sync. However, she was given the option to save Purga from elimination, with the episode ending in a cliffhanger.: Guest Judge: Faisy; Main Challenge: In teams, present a set of cohesive looks using Jerga, a coarse woolen fabric popular in Mexico; Runway Theme: La Más Recursiva (The Most Resourceful); Challenge Winners: Ariel, Aries and Cattriona; Challenge Prize: A $5,000 cash tip; Bottom Two: La Kyliezz and Purga; Lip-Sync Song: "Tu dama de hierro" by Marisela; Eliminated: None
| 56 | 5 | "La Más Floral" | 10 October 2023 |
At the beginning of the episode, it is revealed that La Kyliezz decided to save Purga from elimination. For this week's mini-challenge, the queens will impersonate celebrities while answering questions about them. Dimittra wins the mini-challenge, and won the immunity lipstick, which she can use at any time during the competition. Alexis Mvgler is named as the worst in the mini-challenge, and is automatically up for elimination. For the main challenge, the queens will present a look inspired by the native Flora of Mexico. The flower inspirations were as follows: Alexis Mvgler - Flor de Capomo (Tropical Royalblue Waterlily); Ariel - Bugambilia (Bougainvillea); Aries - Alcatraz (Calla Lily); Cattriona - Xtabentún (Christmasvine); Dimittra - Lilium Acapulco (Stargazer Lily); Electra Walpurgis - Flor de Vainilla (Vanilla Flower); Juana Guadalupe - Violeta de Barranca (Butterwort); Kelly - Girasol (Sunflower); La Kyliezz - Flor de Tigre (Tiger Flower); Purga - Alache (Violetta); Shantelle - Nochebuena (Poinsettia); On the runway, category is La Más Floral (The Most Floral). Ariel, Aries, Juana Guadalupe and Shantelle receive positive critiques, with Juana Guadalupe winning the challenge. Alexis Mvgler, Dimittra and La Kyliezz receive negative critiques, with Dimittra being safe. Before the lip-sync starts, Alexis Mvgler decides to use her immunity lipstick, to save herself from elimination. She then had to decide who to put in the bottom two in her place. She picked Purga, meaning that La Kyliezz and Purga are the bottom two. They lip-sync to "Flores" by Kenia Os. La Kyliezz wins the lip-sync and Purga sashays away.: Guest Judge: Consuelo Duval; Mini-Challenge: Impersonate celebrities while answering questions about them; Mini-Challenge Winner: Dimittra; Mini-Challenge Prize: Immunity Lipstick; Mini-Challenge Loser: Alexis Mvgler; Main Challenge: Present a look inspired by the native Flora of Mexico; Runway Theme: La Más Floral (The Most Floral); Challenge Winner: Juana Guadalupe; Challenge Prize: A $5,000 cash tip; Bottom Two: La Kyliezz and Purga; Lip-Sync Song: "Flores" by Kenia Os; Eliminated: Purga
| 57 | 6 | "La Más Nahual" | 17 October 2023 |
For this week's mini-challenge, the queens will have to search for a hidden key in a set of mysterious boxes full of gross or scary objects while blindfolded. La Kyliezz wins the mini-challenge, and won the immunity lipstick, which she can use at any time during the competition. For the main challenge, the queens will present a dark, witchy look that reveals into an animal look, inspired by the myth of the Nahuals. The Nahual inspirations were as follows: Alexis Mvgler - Cabra (Goat); Ariel - Cuervo (Raven); Aries - Lechuza (Owl); Cattriona - Gato (Cat); Dimittra - Murciélago (Bat); Electra Walpurgis - Lobo (Wolf); Juana Guadalupe - Alacrán (Scorpion); Kelly - Cerdo (Pig); La Kyliezz - Jaguar; Shantelle - Jabalí (Wild Boar); On the runway, category is La Más Nahual (The Most Nahual). Ariel, Aries and Cattriona receive positive critiques, with Aries winning the challenge. Alexis Mvgler, Kelly and Shantelle receive negative critiques, and are announced as the bottom three. They lip-sync to "Mermelada" by Mariana Seoane. Kelly and Shantelle win the lip-sync and Alexis Mvgler sashays away.: Guest Judge: Daniela Magun; Mini-Challenge: Search for a hidden key in a set of mysterious boxes full of gross or scary objects while blindfolded; Mini-Challenge Winner: La Kyliezz; Mini-Challenge Prize: Immunity Lipstick; Main Challenge: Present a dark, witchy look that reveals into an animal look, inspired by the myth of the Nahuals; Runway Theme: La Más Nahual (The Most Nahual); Challenge Winner: Aries; Challenge Prize: A $5,000 cash tip; Bottom Three: Alexis Mvgler, Kelly and Shantelle; Lip-Sync Song: "Mermelada" by Mariana Seoane; Eliminated: Alexis Mvgler
| 58 | 7 | "La Más Azul Peltre" | 24 October 2023 |
For this week's main challenge, the queens will record vocals and perform in Feminosas Lunares, a musical inspired by Sailor Moon and Hispanic pop songs. The musical roles and parodied songs were as follows: Ariel - Feminosa Neptuno (Queen Neptune), "Linda" by Tokischa and Rosalía; Aries - Feminosa Urano (Queen Uranus), "Linda" by Tokischa and Rosalía; Cattriona - Feminosa Venus (Queen Venus), "Ven Conmigo (Solamente Tú)" by Christina Aguilera; Dimittra - Feminosa Mercurio (Queen Mercury), "Agüita" by Danna Paola; Electra Walpurgis - Feminosa Pluto (Queen Pluto), "Tick Tock" by Thalía, Farina and Sofía Reyes; Juana Guadalupe - Feminosa Jupiter (Queen Jupiter), "Vive" by Kabah; Kelly - Feminosa de la Luna (Queen Moon), "Gira Que Gira" by Lynda; La Kyliezz - Feminosa Marte (Queen Mars), "Candela" by Noelia; Shantelle - Feminosa Saturno (Queen Saturn), "Grande" by Gloria Trevi and Monica Naranjo; On the runway, category is La Más Azul Peltre (The Most Pewter Blue). Dimittra, Juana Guadalupe and La Kyliezz receive positive critiques, with Juana Guadalupe winning the challenge. Ariel, Aries and Cattriona receive negative critiques, with Aries being safe. Ariel and Cattriona lip-sync to "Yo te diré" by Miranda! and Lali. Cattriona wins the lip-sync and Ariel sashays away.: Guest Judges: Miranda!; Main Challenge: Record vocals and perform in Feminosas Lunares, a musical inspired by Sailor Moon and Hispanic pop songs; Runway Theme: La Más Azul Peltre (The Most Pewter Blue); Challenge Winner: Juana Guadalupe; Challenge Prize: A $5,000 cash tip; Bottom Two: Ariel and Cattriona; Lip-Sync Song: "Yo te diré" by Miranda! and Lali; Eliminated: Ariel
| 59 | 8 | "La Más Animada" | 31 October 2023 |
For this week's main challenge, the queens will makeover male wrestlers into characters of popular Mexican animated series, films or comic strips. The animated series, films and comic strip inspirations were as follows: Aries - Los Sustos Ocultos de Frankelda (Frankelda's Book of Spooks); Cattriona - El Gato GC (The GC Cat); Dimittra - La Familia Burrón (The Burron Family); Electra Walpurgis - Katy, la Oruga (Katy, the Caterpillar); Juana Guadalupe - Kalimán, el Hombre Increíble (Kalimán, the Incredible Man); Kelly - Viruta y Capulina (Viruta and Capulina); La Kyliezz - Rarotonga; Shantelle - El Libro Vaquero (The Cowboy Book); On the runway, category is La Más Animada (The Most Animated). Aries, Cattriona and Electra Walpurgis receive positive critiques, with Cattriona winning the challenge. Dimittra, Kelly and Shantelle receive negative critiques, with Shantelle being safe. Before the lip-sync starts, Dimittra decides to use her immunity lipstick, to save herself from elimination. She then had to decide who to put in the bottom two in her place. She picked Shantelle, meaning that Kelly and Shantelle are the bottom two. They lip-sync to "Azúcar amargo" by Fey. Kelly wins the lip-sync and Shantelle sashays away.: Guest Judge: Fey; Main Challenge: Makeover male wrestlers into characters of popular Mexican animated series, films or comic strips; Runway Theme: La Más Animada (The Most Animated); Challenge Winner: Cattriona; Challenge Prize: A $5,000 cash tip; Bottom Two: Kelly and Shantelle; Lip-Sync Song: "Azúcar amargo" by Fey; Eliminated: Shantelle
| 60 | 9 | "La Más Divina Infantita" | 7 November 2023 |
For this week's mini-challenge, the queens will rewrite and sing a Banda song with a political, comical twist. Aries, Juana Guadalupe and Cattriona win the mini-challenge, and earn 5, 3 and 2 extra stars added to their final challenge score this week, respectively. For the main challenge, the queens will present a look inspired by the Holy Infant Mary, a Holy dedication of the Virgin Mary's childhood. On the runway, category is La Más Divina Infantita (The Most Holy Infant). Cattriona, Electra Walpurgis and Juana Guadalupe receive positive critiques, with Electra Walpurgis winning the challenge. Dimittra, Kelly and La Kyliezz receive negative critiques, with Kelly being safe. Before the lip-sync starts, La Kyliezz decides to use her immunity lipstick, to save herself from elimination. She then had to decide who to put in the bottom two in her place. She picked Kelly, meaning that Dimittra and Kelly are the bottom two. They lip-sync to "La chapa que vibran" by La Materialista. Kelly wins the lip-sync and Dimittra sashays away.: Guest Judge: Karely Ruiz; Mini-Challenge: Rewrite and sing a Banda song with a political, comical twist; Mini-Challenge Winners: Aries, Juana Guadalupe and Cattriona; Mini-Challenge Prize: Extra stars added to their final challenge score; Main Challenge: Present a look inspired by the Holy Infant Mary, a Holy dedication of the Virgin Mary's childhood; Runway Theme: La Más Divina Infantita (The Most Holy Infant); Challenge Winner: Electra Walpurgis; Challenge Prize: A $5,000 cash tip; Bottom Two: Dimittra and Kelly; Lip-Sync Song: "La chapa que vibran" by La Materialista; Eliminated: Dimittra
| 61 | 10 | "La Más Galardonada" | 14 November 2023 |
For this week's mini-challenge, the queens will skydive at a height of 17,000 feet. For the main challenge, the queens will shoot a music video for Yari Mejía's song "Posa Que Posa". On the runway, category is La Más Galardonada (The Most Awarded). Electra Walpurgis wins the challenge. The judges then reveal that all of the contestants must participate and win a Lip-sync Battle Royale Smackdown to proceed to the finale. Firstly, Electra Walpurgis and Juana Guadalupe lip-sync to "Disciplina" by Lali. Both queens win the lip-sync. Then, Cattriona and La Kyliezz lip-sync to "SloMo" by Chanel. Cattriona wins the lip-sync and La Kyliezz sashays away. Lastly, Aries and Kelly lip-sync to "El Anillo" by Jennifer Lopez. Aries wins the lip-sync and Kelly sashays away.: Guest Judges: Diego Cardenas and Jorge Anzaldo; Mini-Challenge Skydive at a height of 17,000 feet; Main Challenge: Shoot a music video for Yari Mejía's song "Posa Que Posa"; Runway Theme: La Más Galardonada (The Most Awarded); Challenge Winner: Electra Walpurgis; Challenge Prize: A $5,000 cash tip; Lip-Sync Songs: "Disciplina" by Lali, "SloMo" by Chanel and "El Anillo" by Jennifer Lopez; Eliminated: Kelly and La Kyliezz
| 62 | 11 | "Día de Muertas" | 21 November 2023 |
All the queens, after walking the runway on the category Día de Muertas (Day of the Dead), return to talk about what happened this season. Discussions include, Mizz Peaches' unaired looks and issues with her designers, Ank Cosart's shocking elimination and her hopes of returning to the competition, Braulio 8000's disinterest in causing drama, Purga being sent to the bottom by Alexis Mvgler and her controversies, Alexis Mvgler's recent dispute with Aviesc Who? and fan reception, Ariel's unfair elimination and being the villain of the season, Shantelle apologizing to Kelly for bullying her and her overall mean-girl attitude. Dimittra constantly being compared to Soro Nasty and feeling unfairly critiqued, Kelly's hardships as a trans woman and the bullying she experienced during the season, La Kyliezz' close friendship with Purga, Electra Walpurgis being slandered at clubs and feeling excluded during the season, Aries being accused of buying followers and her disappointing lip-sync last episode, Cattriona's constant comparisons to Raga Diamante, and Juana Guadalupe's multiple personalities and slowly becoming closer to the rest of the cast.: Runway Theme: Día de Muertas (Day of the Dead)
| 64 | 12 | "La Gran Final" | 28 November 2023 |
For the final challenge of the season, the queens will produce, direct, and star in their own original performance on an original track recorded by themselves with DJ Neiko, and then present a look inspired by Mexican culture. The queens Mexican Culture inspirations were as follows: Aries - Maya civilization; Cattriona - Yucatán; Electra Walpurgis - Free Healthcare; Juana Guadalupa - Nuestra Señora de Guadalupe; The queens walk the runway one last time. It is revealed that La Kyliezz is this season's La Más Querida (Miss Congeniality). It is announced that Cattriona is the winner, leaving Aries, Electra Walpurgis and Juana Guadalupe as the runners-up.: Guest Judges: Vanessa Labios 4K; Main Challenge: Produce, direct, and star in their own original performance on an original track recorded by themselves with DJ Neiko and present a look inspired by Mexican Culture; Runway Theme: Lo Que Más Amo De México (What I Most Love About Mexico); La Más Querida: La Kyliezz; Runners-up: Aries, Electra Walpurgis and Juana Guadalupe; Winner of La Más Draga Season Six: Cattriona
