= LGBTQ culture in Colombia =

LGBTQ culture in Colombia refers to the various artistic and leisure activities that focus on sexual diversity or involve the participation of LGBTQ people in the Republic of Colombia.

== Cinema ==
In 1999, La Virgen de los sicarios, an adaptation of Fernando Vallejo's novel of the same name, was filmed, generating nationwide controversy and attempts at censorship. Its subject was homosexual love in the context of a society plagued by drug trafficking.

In the 21st century, fictional films such as The Firefly, Mariposas verdes, and Nowhere (2020) have been released that illustrate the living conditions of LGBTQ people in Colombia, alongside documentaries such as If God Were a Woman (2021) and Señorita María, la falda de la montaña (2017).

The Pink Cycle is a film event held in Bogotá since 2001, founded by the Goethe Institute, the Colombian-American Center of Medellín, the Pensar Institute of the Javeriana University, and the Cinemateca Distrital (Cinemateca of Bogotá). Its primary purpose is to show films, promote discussions regarding sexual and gender diversity, highlight the stories and experiences of the LGBTIQ+ community, and foster awareness, respect, and inclusion for sexually diverse peoples in Colombian society. This event has been recognized in Bogotá's cultural calendar, attracting film lovers, activists, and those interested in exploring the reality of the queer community.

== Literature ==
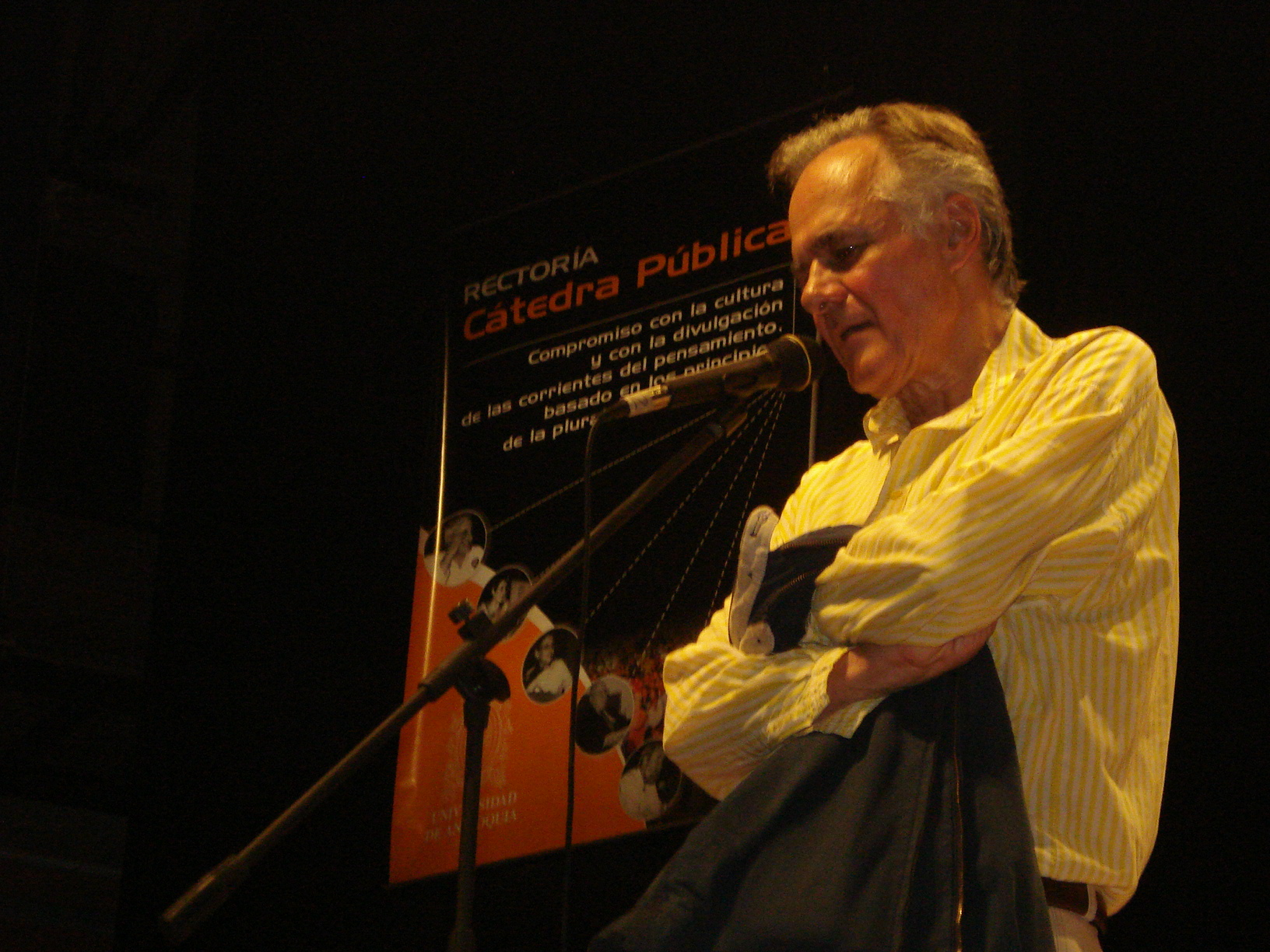
Fernando Vallejo, a prominent author, in 2008

Since the 20th century, LGBTQ literature in Colombia has developed a rich history, due in part to prominent authors such as Porfirio Barba Jacob and Bernardo Arias Trujillo, the author of the first openly homosexual novel in Colombia. Over time, figures such as Fernando Vallejo and Efraim Medina Reyes have come to both national and international prominence for their work concerning LGBTQ issues.

In Colombian LGBTQ literature, the most common genres are short stories and novels, with a greater presence of male authors. The diverse homosexual experiences portrayed in these works are influenced by geographical, professional, and social factors. Different perspectives, from radical stances to politically correct attitudes, are represented in these works.

Fictional works such as "Por los caminos de Sodoma: confesiones íntimos de un homosexual" and "Te quiero mucho, poquito, nada" are among the most prominent representations of homosexual desire in Colombian literature. Relevant authors include Fernando Vallejo, Fernando Molano Vargas, Alonso Sánchez Baute, and Laura Restrepo. Notable poets include Porfirio Barba Jacob, Bernardo Arias Trujillo, Raúl Gómez Jattin and John Better. In terms of theatrical works, playwright José Manuel Freidel repeatedly addressed homosexual themes in his extensive work and became known for his monologue "¡Ay! Días Chiqui", in which he denounced violence against travestis.

== Museums ==
Museo Q is a transit museum in Colombia founded in 2014 by a group of queer people with the goal of rescuing, disseminating, and highlighting the stories and memories of LGBTQ individuals as an integral part of the national narrative. Through exhibitions and events related to sexual and gender diversity, the museum addresses topics such as coming out, marriage equality, and eroticism in art. Although it has no permanent location, the museum collaborates with other institutions and individuals to curate works from alternative narratives that demonstrate resistance and resilience. In 2018, the National Museum of Colombia opened a gallery dedicated to the LGBTQ community in response to social advocacy, exhibiting objects related to the LGBTQ community and interweaving stories related to the armed conflict and other controversial topics in Colombian history. Through its multifaceted and dynamic approach, Museo Q seeks to generate dialogue and visibility for traditionally excluded populations as a space for exhibition and personal narratives.

== Music ==
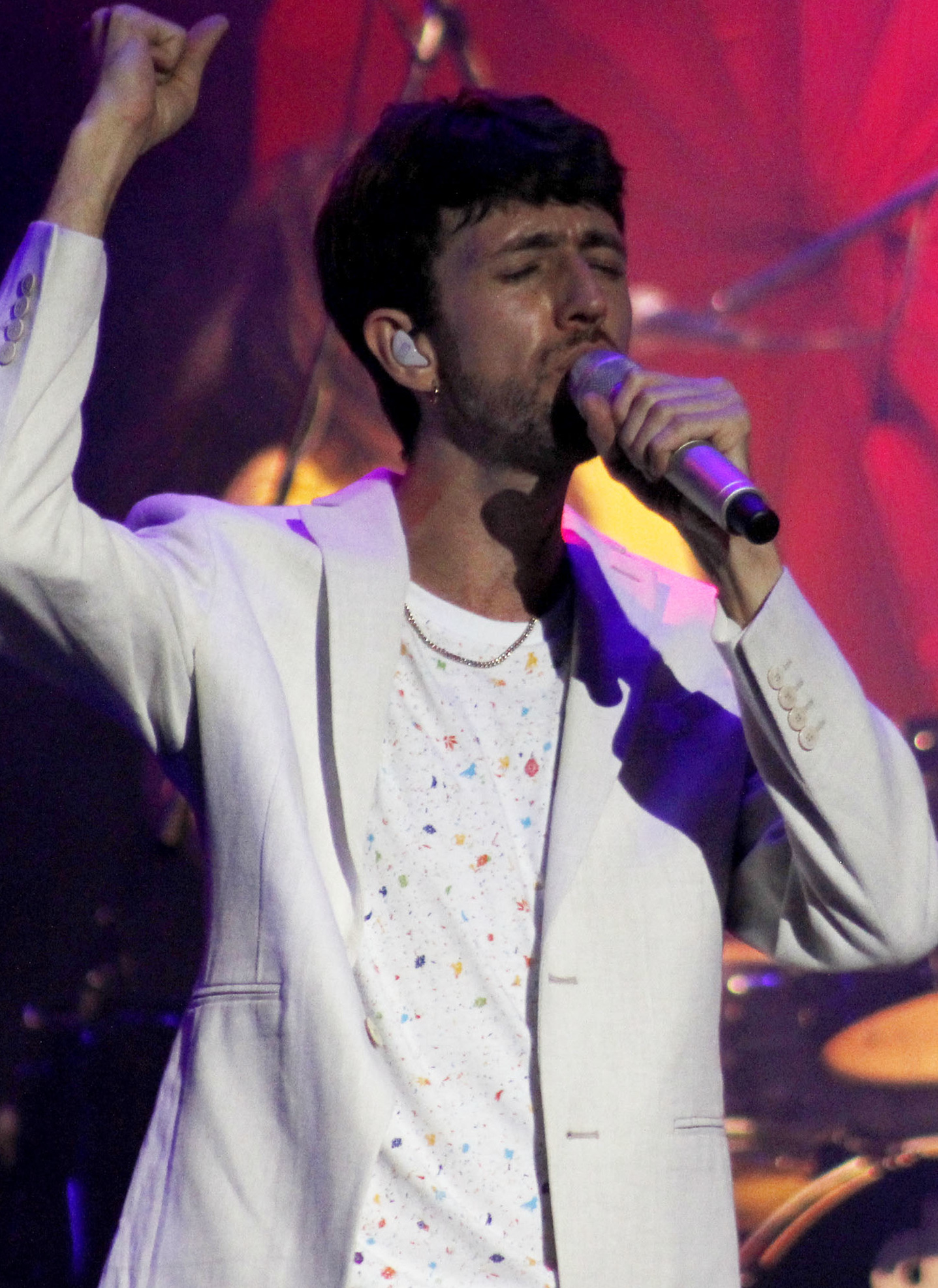
In 2019, Esteman, on his album Amor Libre (Free Love), sought to openly share his sexual orientation with his audience, with the goal of promoting acceptance and normalcy around the topic.

In 1990, Shakira, one of the most internationally recognized artists in Colombian history emerged on the music scene. Although she does not identify as a member of the LGBTQ community, she has been a strong advocate for equality and the right to sexual expression, resulting in her being considered an icon for many LGBTQ people in the country.

In the 2000s, various singer-songwriters have emerged on the Colombian music scene, such as Esteman and Lido Pimienta, who have gained recognition for their fusion of genres and their social activism, including the defense of the rights of the LGBTQ community.

== Television ==
Although some LGBTQ characters have been included in Colombian series and soap operas, their representation has been limited, often relegating them to supporting or caricatured roles. Although protests for their inclusion have diminished over time, LGBTQ characters are typically presented superficially and lack emotional depth. Furthermore, children's programs ignore the issue of sexual and gender diversity, while non-fiction programs show stereotypical images that do not accurately reflect the daily lives of LGBTQ people.

This series "Los pecados de Inés de Hinojosa" (1988) generated significant controversy for its sex scenes, featuring lesbian themes and nudity; however, it achieved an important milestone in Colombian television when it was named one of the most outstanding productions at the commemoration of 60 years of television organized by Señal Colombia in 2014.

The telenovela "Perfume de agonía" (1997), directed by Kepa Amuchastegui, was censored due to the inclusion of "homosexual scenes". This decision resulted in the cancellation of the series after only a few episodes. The controversy arose from a kiss between the characters played by Marcela Gallego and Alejandra Borrero.

In 1998, the actress Alejandra Borrero, after achieving mainstream success in her acting career and at a time when sexuality was a taboo subject in Colombia, publicly declared herself a lesbian on national television.

In 2005, RCN Televisión, one of the country's most important media outlets, aired the soap opera Los Reyes, which featured a transgender woman as a supporting character for the first time in Colombian history.

== Drag ==
The drag movement in Colombia is widely considered to have begun in 1995, with the opening of the Theatronvenue, where drag artists such as Asesinata, Viola, Sbelty, and La Wonder Gay performed. The Miss Universe Drag Star competition has been held at the Theatron since 2002.

In 2017, following the success of RuPaul's Drag Race, Oh My Drag festivals began to be held in Bogotá, featuring both national and international drag artists and aiming to entertain the public as well as raise awareness of drag art. The first festival was inaugurated in 2017 by Laganja Estranja, a contestant from the sixth season of RuPaul's Drag Race.

Although Colombia does not have a national program that highlights local drag, such as in Mexico (La Más Draga), Spain (Drag Race España) or Argentina (Juego de reinas), there have been Colombian artists who have achieved recognition and an international fan base as a result of competing in competitions abroad. These artists include drag queens such as Amyl, Adriana and Mocca Bone, who have competed in several programs across the Drag Race franchise, as well as Light King and Gretha White, well-known contestants on La Más Draga.

Drag kings are less visible and less mainstream, and their origins are more recent. One of the most prominent figures and pioneers of drag king art in Colombia is Antoine Du Toulousse, the stage name of Yudy Monroy.

== Tourism ==
Colombia has become an increasingly welcoming destination for the LGBTQ community. In 2016, it became the twenty-fourth country to approve same-sex marriage nationwide and boasts an advanced legal system to protect the rights of this group. Thanks to its cultural diversity, connectivity, and extensive tourism offerings, Colombia was recognized as an emerging LGBTQ destination at FITUR 2017.

The cities of Bogotá, Medellín, Cartagena, and Barranquilla are popular tourist destinations for the LGBTQ community. These cities host specialized events that combine the essence of Colombian culture with LGBTQ festivities, such as pride marches, music and theater festivals.

The Barranquilla Gay Carnival (also known as Guacherna Gay) is an event that celebrates diversity and seeks to highlight the contributions of the LGBTIQ+ community during the Barranquilla Carnival. Founded by Jairo Polo Altamar in the 1990s, this special event aims to promote the inclusion and visibility of sexual diversity in one of Colombia's largest cultural events. Over time, it has gained recognition and momentum, with notable developments including the crowning of the Gay Carnival Kings and the endorsement of the Mayor's Office of Barranquilla.
