= Hidden Mistake (drag artist) =

Chilean drag performer

- Born: April 3, 1997 (age 29); Santiago de Chile
- Occupation: drag artist

Hidden Mistake (born April 3, 1997) is a Chilean drag artist known for competing in the third season of Versus Drag Queens and the fifth season of La Más Draga.

== Career ==
In 2018, Hidden Mistake competed in the third season of the web show Versus Drag Queens, produced by Rocko Cornejo. The competition consisted of three main challenge and one challenge for immunity. She was deemed the winner of that season.

In 2022, she was of the contestants in La Más Draga. She was one of four finalists alongside Paper Cut, Liza Zan Zuzzi, and Fifí Estah, who was declared that season's winner.

In February 2023, she starred in a video that went viral over social media in which she performed a makeover to look as close as possible to the Mexican actress Elizabeth Álvarez. The same year, she was invited to LGBT pride in Nuevo Laredo, Mexico. She was the opening act and attended the event with fellow Chilean drag queen Calypso and Aisha Dollkils, both of whom were also previously contestants on La Más Draga.

In January 2024, she was one of several meet and greet participants in the second edition of the event "Regalando Sonrisas" (English: "Giving Smiles"). It is an event centered around collecting toys for Dia de los Reyes (Epiphany) and starring national and international drag artists. She attended Pride Culiacán 2026 alongside other drag performers like Gia Gunn, Aetrix, and Pony Pockett.

== Personal life ==
During her time at La Más Draga, she presented herself as a transgender woman, but she actually identifies as non-binary and uses she and they pronouns. In a September 2020 post on Instagram, Hidden Mistake came out as asexual. She says in the post that she was often assumed to be gay because she is a drag performer. Her fashion for drag sense is inspired by the fashion of Harujuku Japanese fashion with a mix of fantasy and horror elements.
