= La Más Draga season 7 =

Seventh season of 'La Más Draga'

La Más Draga
- Season 7
- Promotional poster for season seven
- Hosted by: Karime Pindter
- Judges: Yari Mejía; Bernardo "Letal" Vázquez; Natalia Sosa
- No. of contestants: 14
- Winner: Nayla Downs
- Runners-up: Deetox Alanís; Moon; Tulsa

Release
- Original network: YouTube
- Original release: 30 September – 16 December 2025

Season chronology
- ← Previous; Season 6

The seventh season of La Más Draga aired on 30 September 2025, available through YouTube, and was produced by La Gran Diabla Producciones. The series featured fourteen contestants from all over the American continent, competing for the title of La Más Draga of Mexico and Latin America and a cash prize of $700,000 MXN Pesos. The winner of the seventh season of La Más Draga was Nayla Downs, with Deetox Alanís, Moon and Tulsa as runners-up.

The judges panel of this season include Mexican TV personality Karime Pindter, who is also the main host, hair and make-up artist Yari Mejía, drag performer Bernardo "Letal" Vázquez, and singer and theater actress Natalia Sosa.

Similarly to previous seasons, thirty-three drag performers from the audition tapes were selected and asked to perform in a Live Audition held in Mexico City. The live auditions was broadcast on 17 September 2024, where the six previous winners of the show evaluated the aspiring participants without, unlike in previous editions, immediately confirming any contestants in the cast. The official cast was announced on 9 September 2025.

== Contestants ==
Ages, names, and cities stated are at time of filming.

Contestants of La Más Draga season 7 and their backgrounds
Contestant	Age	Hometown	Outcome
Nayla Downs	33	Tepic, Nayarit	Winner (Note: Nayla Downs originally placed eighth before returning to the competition.)
Deetox Alanís	30	Mexico City	Runner-Ups
Moon	23	Bogotá, Colombia	Runner-Ups
Tulsa (Note: Tulsa Walpurgis is referred to as Tulsa on the show.)	25	Veracruz, Veracruz	Runner-Ups
Candela Yeye	29	Mérida, Yucatán	5th place
Konny Kortez	24	Mexico City	5th place
Calypso	33	Santiago, Chile	7th place (Note: Caos Lascivia was voted La Más Querida.)
Caos Lascivia	33	Caracas, Venezuela	7th place
Brighty Stun	21	Matamoros, Tamaulipas	9th place
Axelle De Vil	22	Chihuahua City, Chihuahua	10th place
Ricura Santana	32	Torreón, Coahuila	11th place
Greta Grimm	33	Guadalajara, Jalisco	12th place
Oslo	26	Puebla, Puebla	13th place
Paty Piñata	42	Monterrey, Nuevo León	14th place

== Contestant progress ==
Legend:

Nayla Downs won Las Más Draga season 7.
Deetox Alanís, Moon and Tulsa were the runners-up.
Caos Lascivia was voted La Más Querida (LMQ).
WIN indicates that the contestant received the highest score and won the challenge.
DS indicates that the contestant was declared safe and received the Duchess Scholarship from Karime.
BDS indicates that the contestant was up for elimination and received the Duchess Scholarship from Karime.
SAFE indicates that the contestant was declared safe by the judges.
SAVE indicates that the contestant was automatically in the bottom two for having two red seals, but later won the immunity and was safe, also receiving the Dutchess Scholarship from Karime.
IMM (Immunity) indicates that the contestant was immune for the episode.
IN indicates that the contestant won their comeback lip-sync and returned to the competition.
BTM (Bottom) indicates that the contestant received one of the lowest scores and was up for elimination.
BTM (Bottom) indicates that the contestant was up for elimination for having two red seals.
ELIM (Eliminated) indicates that the contestant received one of the lowest scores and was eliminated.
OUT indicates that the contestant lost the chance to re-enter the competition.
Guest indicates that the contestant returned as a guest.

Contestants progress with placements in each episode
Contestant	Episode											
Contestant	1	2	3	4	5	6	7 (Note: Originally, Caos Lascivia was up of elimination due to the Double Red Seal twist. However, Caos used the Golden Seal she had previously won, granting her immunity during the episode. In her place, Moon was put up of elimination based on the weekly ranking score.)	8	9	10	11	12
Nayla Downs	WIN	WIN	SAFE	SAFE	SAFE	BTM	SAFE	ELIM	IN	WIN	Guest	Winner
Deetox Alanís	DS	IMM	SAFE	SAFE	SAFE	SAFE	WIN	IMM	SAFE	SAFE	Guest	Runner-up
Moon	SAFE	SAFE	WIN	SAFE	SAFE	WIN	BTM	DS	WIN	SAFE	Guest	Runner-up
Tulsa	SAFE	IMM	SAFE	SAFE	SAFE	SAFE	SAFE	WIN	DS	SAFE	Guest	Runner-up
Candela Yeye	SAFE	IMM	BTM	SAFE	BTM	DS	SAFE	SAFE	SAFE	ELIM	Guest	Guest
Konny Kortez	SAFE	SAFE	SAFE	BDS	SAFE	WIN	SAFE	BTM	SAFE	ELIM	Guest	Guest
Calypso	SAFE	DS	SAFE	SAFE	SAFE	SAFE	SAFE	SAFE	ELIM		Guest	Guest
Caos Lascivia	SAFE	SAFE	SAFE	SAFE	WIN	SAFE	SAVE	SAFE	ELIM		Guest	LMQ
Brighty Stun	SAFE	IMM	SAFE	SAFE	IMM	SAFE	ELIM		OUT		Guest	Guest
Axelle De Vil	SAFE	SAFE	SAFE	WIN	DS	ELIM			OUT		Guest	Guest
Ricura Santana	SAFE	IMM	SAFE	BTM	ELIM				OUT		Guest	Guest
Greta Grimm	SAFE	IMM	DS	ELIM					OUT		Guest	Guest
Oslo	SAFE	BTM	ELIM						OUT		Guest	Guest
Paty Piñata	SAFE	ELIM							OUT		Guest	Guest

=== Scores history ===
Legend:

The contestant received a Golden Seal, which granted immunity from elimination.
The contestant used their Golden Seal during the episode.
The contestant received a Red Seal for being the worst during the mini-challenge.
The contestant discarded their Red Seal in exchange for a disadvantage in the main challenge.

Summary of weekly voting and results
Contestant	Episode										Total
Contestant	1	2	3	4	5	6	7	8	9	10	Total
Nayla	19	20	19	15	18	16	16	16	19	20	178
Deetox	18	14	14	10	14	10	20	8	16	16	140
Moon	12	13	20	17	16	20	10	18	20	19	165
Tulsa	8	15	17	13	17	14	19	19	18	18	158
Candela	8	15	8	16	10	18	10	13	18	16	132
Konny	15	12	15	9	12	20	17	10	12	14	136
Calypso	14	16	16	18	18	19	14	18	11		144
Caos	15	17	16	14	19	17	18	15	11		142
Brighty	14	14	12	12	9	13	9		15		98
Axelle	17	18	18	19	16	9			14		111
Ricura	13	14	10	9	9				15		70
Greta	16	9	14	9					17		65
Oslo	10	11	8						12		41
Paty	7	6							13		26

Summary of the seal collection
Contestant	Episode									
Contestant	1	2	3	4	5	6	7	8	9	10
Nayla	—	—	+1	—	—	+1	—	—		—
Deetox	—	—	—	—	—	—	+1	-1	—	—
Moon	—	—	—	—	—	—	—	—	—	—
Tulsa	+1	—	+1	-1	+1	—	-1	—	—	—
Candela	—	—	—	—	—	+1	—	—	—	—
Konny	—	—	—	—	+1	—	—	—	—	—
Calypso	—	—	—	—	+1	—	—	—	—	
Caos	—	—	+1	—	—	+1	0	—	—	
Brighty	—	—	—	—	0	—	—			
Axelle	—	—	+1	-1	—	+1				
Ricura	—	—	—	—	—					
Greta	—	—	—	—						
Oslo	—	—	—							
Paty	—	+1								

== Lip syncs ==
Legend:

The contestant won the lip sync to win the mini-challenge.
The contestant was eliminated after their first time in the bottom.
The contestant was eliminated after their second time in the bottom.
The contestant was eliminated after their third time in the bottom.

Episode	Contestants			Song	Winner
1	Oslo	vs.	Tulsa	"Miau" (Cattriona)	Tulsa
1	Calypso	vs.	Nayla Downs	"Loca" (Lola Cortés)	Nayla Downs
1	Konny Kortez	vs.	Ricura Santana	"Fiesta" (Fifí Estah)	Ricura Santana
1	Candela Yeye	vs.	Caos Lascivia	"Espectaculera" (Georgiana)	Candela Yeye
1	Deetox Alanís	vs.	Paty Piñata	"Ritmito" (Yari Mejía)	Deetox Alanís
1	Axelle De Vil	vs.	Brighty Stun	"Paisa" (Velvetine)	Brighty Stun
1	Greta Grimm	vs.	Moon	"Cabrona" (C-Pher)	Greta Grimm
Episode	Contestants			Song	Eliminated
2	Oslo	vs.	Paty Piñata	"Reina de corazones" (Alejandra Guzmán)	Paty Piñata
2	Oslo	vs.	Paty Piñata	"Bye mamá" (Alejandra Guzmán)	Paty Piñata
3	Candela Yeye	vs.	Oslo	"Quédate con ella" (Natalia Jiménez)	Oslo
4	Greta Grimm vs. Konny Kortez vs. Ricura Santana			"Gatita" (Bellakath)	Greta Grimm
4	Greta Grimm vs. Konny Kortez vs. Ricura Santana			"Reggaeton Champagne" (Bellakath)	Greta Grimm
5	Candela Yeye	vs.	Ricura Santana	"Descapotao" (Ptazeta)	Ricura Santana
6	Axelle De Vil	vs.	Nayla Downs	"La original" (Emilia, Tini)	Axelle De Vil
7	Brighty Stun	vs.	Moon	"Autopoiética" (Mon Laferte)	Brighty Stun
7	Brighty Stun	vs.	Moon	"Somos ñeros" (El Bogueto)	Brighty Stun
8	Konny Kortez	vs.	Nayla Downs	"Malas decisiones" (Kenia Os)	Nayla Downs
8	Konny Kortez	vs.	Nayla Downs	"VIP" (Kenia Os, Villano Antillano)	Nayla Downs
9 (Note: Instead of the typical bottom two, Calypso and Caos Lascivia were declared as the worst contestants of the week and asked to lip sync against the best one of the eliminated contestants (Nayla Downs) in a three-way lip sync with a double elimination. Nayla ultimately won the lip sync, resulting in her returning to the competition.)	Calypso vs. Caos Lascivia vs. Nayla Downs			"Qué agonía" (Yuridia, Ángela Aguilar)	Calypso
9	Calypso vs. Caos Lascivia vs. Nayla Downs			"Qué agonía" (Yuridia, Ángela Aguilar)	Caos Lascivia
10 (Note: All the contestants had to lip-sync to make it to the finale even though no one was in the bottom.)	Konny Kortez	vs.	Tulsa	"Con los ojos cerrados" (Gloria Trevi)	Konny Kortez
10	Konny Kortez	vs.	Tulsa	"Agárrate" (Gloria Trevi)	Konny Kortez
10	Candela Yeye	vs.	Moon	"Dr. Psiquiatra" (Gloria Trevi)	Candela Yeye
10	Candela Yeye	vs.	Moon	"Me río de ti" (Gloria Trevi)	Candela Yeye
10	Deetox Alanís	vs.	Nayla Downs	"El favor de la soledad" (Gloria Trevi)	None
10	Deetox Alanís	vs.	Nayla Downs	"Habla Blah Blah" (Gloria Trevi)	None

== Judges ==
=== Main judges ===
- Yari Mejía, designer, stylist, singer and model
- Bernardo "Letal" Vázquez, drag queen and professional makeup artist
- Natalia Sosa, singer teather and actress

=== Guest judges ===
- Wendy Guevara, influencer and TV personality
- Sylvia Pasquel, actress
- Natalia Jiménez, singer
- Bellakath, singer, influencer and internet personality
- Yeri Mua, singer, influencer and internet personality
- María León, singer
- El Bogueto, singer
- Kenia Os, singer and youtuber
- Las Alucines, podcasters, influencers and internet personalities
- Gloria Trevi, singer-songwriter and actress

=== Special guests ===
Guests who will appear in episodes, but not judge on the main stage.

Episode 7

- Esmeralda Hernández, beauty influencer and internet personality

Episode 10

- Carlos Antúnez, dancer and México de Colores' representative

Episode 12

- Cry, model and internet personality
- Horacio Villalobos, TV host and actor
- La Supermana, drag performer
- Carlos "Manigüis" Rangel, drag performer and internet personality
- Wendy Guevara, influencer, actress singer and businesswoman
- Cattriona, winner of La Más Draga season 6
- Huma Kyle, contestant of La Más Draga season 5
- La Kyliezz, contestant of La Más Draga season 6
