= Elektra Vandergeld =

Mexican drag performer

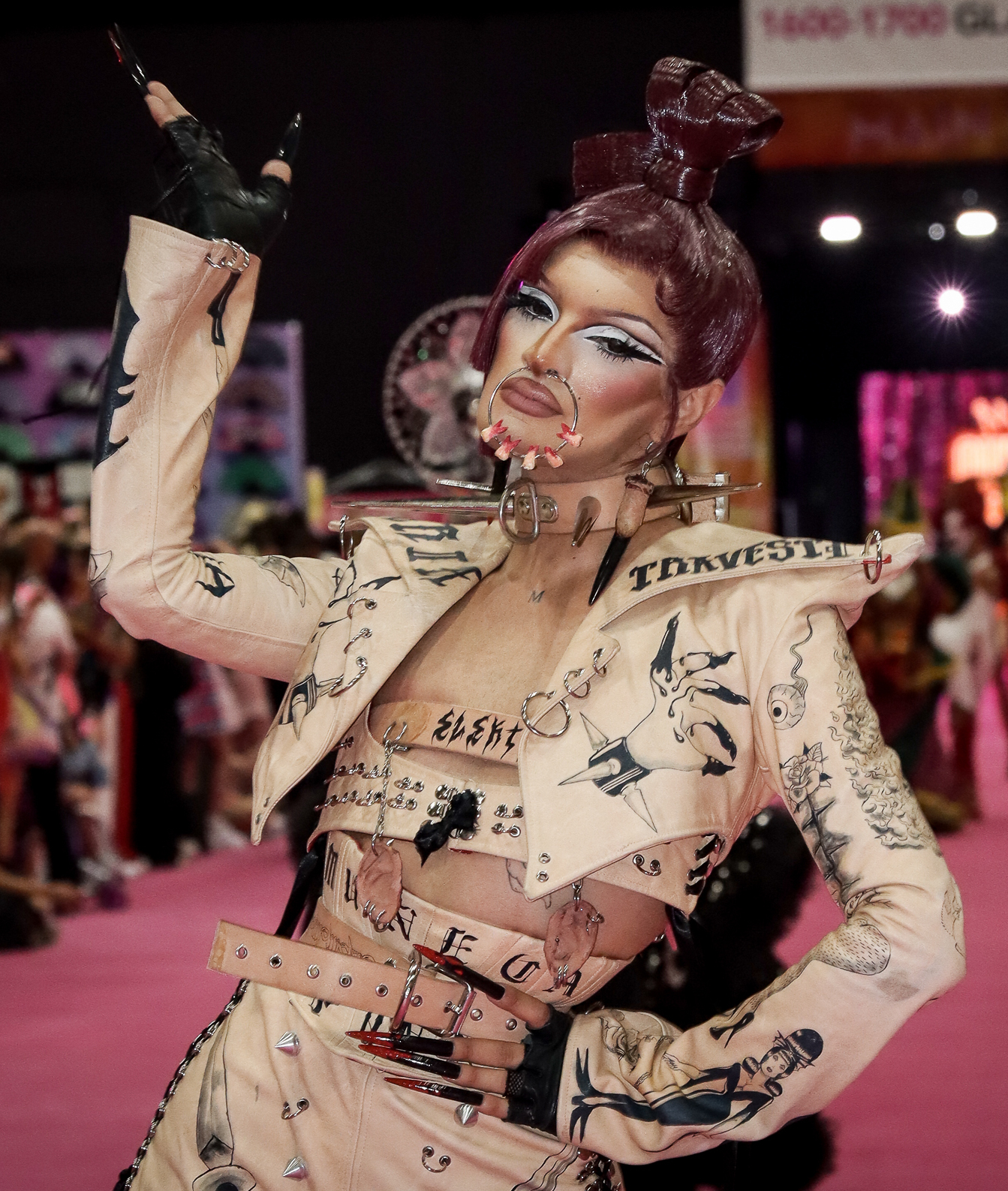
- Vandergeld at RuPaul's DragCon LA, 2024
- Born: Essen Ortiz
- Occupation: Drag queen
- Known for: La Más Draga (season 4); Drag Race México (season 2)

Elektra Vandergeld is the stage name of Eseen Ortiz, a Mexican drag performer best known for winning the first season of Drag Race México: Latina Royale. She previously competed on the fourth season of La Más Draga and the second season of Drag Race México. She is from Mexico City.

== Filmography ==
=== Television ===
Year	Title	Role	Notes
2024	Drag Race México (season 2)	Herself (contestant)	5th place
2026	Drag Race Mexico: Latina Royale	Herself (contestant)	Winner

=== Web series ===
Year	Title	Role	Notes
2021	La Más Draga season 4	Herself (contestant)	Runner up

=== Music videos ===
Year	Title	Artist	Producer
2024	Leexa Fox- Foxxyflow (Video oficial)	Leexa Fox	Manú Jalil
2026	Kenia Os - Slay	Kenia Os	Sony Music Entertainment Mexico

== Discography ==
=== As featured artist ===
Year	Title	Album	Writer(s)	Producer(s)
2021	Yolo (Feat.Elektra Vandergeld)	La Mas Draga 4, Vol.2	Neiko music	La Gran Diabla
2024	"Lonely" (the cast of Drag Race Mexico season 2)	Non-Album/ Single	N/A	Omar Antonio Sosa Latourmerie
