= La Más Draga season 5 =

Fifth season of La Más Draga

La Más Draga
- Season 5
- Promotional poster for season five
- Hosted by: Maca Carriedo
- Judges: Yari Mejía; Bernardo "Letal" Vázquez; Raquel Martínez
- No. of contestants: 12
- Winner: Fifí Estah
- Runners-up: Hidden Mistake; Liza Zan Zuzzi; Paper Cut
- No. of episodes: 12

Release
- Original network: YouTube
- Original release: 27 September – 13 December 2022

Season chronology
- ← Previous; Season 4 Next → Season 6

The fifth season of La Más Draga premiered on 27 September 2022, available through YouTube, and was produced by La Gran Diabla Producciones. The series featured twelve contestants, from all over American Continent, competing for the title of La Más Draga of Mexico and Latin America and a cash prize of $500,000 MXN Pesos. The winner of the fifth season of La Más Draga was Fifí Estah, with Hidden Mistake, Liza Zan Zuzzi and Paper Cut as runners-up.

The judges panel of this season include Mexican TV personality Maca Carriedo, who was also the main host, hair and makeup artist Yari Mejía, drag performer Bernardo "Letal" Vázquez, and Spanish actress and dancer Raquel Martínez.

Similarly to the fourth season, thirty drag performers from the audition tapes were selected and asked to perform in a Live Audition held in Mexico City. The live auditions were broadcast on 15 and 16 March 2022, with three contestants confirmed to be cast by the judges and public vote (Deseos Fab, Fifí Estah and Liza Zan Zuzzi). While the final contestants, alongside the "Secret Contestants", were announced during the first episode of the show. Season 4 contestant Paper Cut returned to the competition.

== Contestants ==
Ages, names, and cities stated are at time of filming.

Contestants of La Más Draga season 5 and their backgrounds
| Contestant | Age | Hometown | Outcome |
|---|---|---|---|
| Fifí Estah | 28 | Lázaro Cárdenas, Michoacán | Winner (Note: Fifí Estah was voted La Más Volada.) |
| Hidden Mistake | 25 | Santiago, Chile | Runners-up (Note: Hidden Mistake originally placed fifth before being asked back to compete after Santa Lucía quit the competition.) |
| Liza Zan Zuzzi | 31 | Acapulco, Guerrero | Runners-up |
| Paper Cut (Note: Paper Cut competed on season 4 before being asked back to compete this season.) | 24 | Mexico City | Runners-up |
| Santa Lucía | 25 | Mexico City | 5th place (Note: Santa Lucía quit the competition during the reunion due to mental health issues.) |
| Gretha White | 29 | Medellín, Colombia | 6th place |
| Peke Balderas | 31 | Monterrey, Nuevo León | 7th place |
| Aisha Dollkills | 21 | San José, Costa Rica | 8th place (Note: Aisha Dollkills originally placed eleventh, but re-entered the competition and ultimately placed eighth.) |
| Light King | 30 | Cali, Colombia | 9th place (Note: Light King quit the competition before the lip sync.) |
| Huma Kyle | 27 | Chihuahua City, Chihuahua | 10th place (Note: Huma Kyle originally placed twelfth, but re-entered the competition and ultimately placed tenth. She was later voted La Más Querida.) |
| Isabella y Catalina (Note: Isabella y Catalina is a drag duo consisting of Twin Isabella and Twin Catalina. They competed as a single contestant.) | 25 | San Diego, United States | 11th place |
| Deseos Fab | 24 | Mexico City | 12th place |

== Contestant progress ==
Legend:

Fifí Estah won Las Más Draga season 5.
Hidden Mistake, Liza Zan Zuzzi and Paper Cut were the runners-up.
Huma Kyle was voted La Más Querida (LMQ).
Fifí Estah was voted La Más Volada (LMV).
WIN indicates that the contestant received the highest score and won the challenge.
SAFE indicates that the contestant was declared safe by the judges.
IMM (Immunity) indicates that the contestant was immune for the episode.
IN indicates that the contestant won their comeback lip sync and returned to the competition.
BTM (Bottom) indicates that the contestant received one of the lowest scores and was up for elimination.
ELIM (Eliminated) indicates that the contestant received one of the lowest scores and was eliminated.
OUT indicates that the contestant either lost their chance or refused to re-enter the competition.
QUIT indicates that the contestant quit the competition.
Guest indicates that the contestant returned as a guest.

Progress of contestants including placements in each episode
| Contestant | Episode | | | | | | | | | | | | |
| Contestant | 1 | 2 | 3 | 4 | 5 | 6 | 7 | 8 | 9 | 10 | 11 | 12 | |
|---|---|---|---|---|---|---|---|---|---|---|---|---|---|
| Fifí Estah | SAFE | WIN | WIN | SAFE | SAFE | SAFE | SAFE | BTM | SAFE | WIN | Guest | Winner | LMV |
| Hidden Mistake | SAFE | SAFE | IMM | SAFE | SAFE | BTM | WIN | SAFE | SAFE | ELIM | Guest | Runner-up | |
| Liza Zan Zuzzi | SAFE | SAFE | SAFE | BTM | WIN | SAFE | SAFE | SAFE | SAFE | SAFE | Guest | Runner-up | |
| Paper Cut | | SAFE | IMM | WIN | SAFE | WIN | SAFE | SAFE | SAFE | SAFE | Guest | Runner-up | |
| Santa Lucía | SAFE | BTM | SAFE | WIN | BTM | SAFE | SAFE | WIN | SAFE | SAFE | QUIT | Guest | |
| Gretha White | SAFE | SAFE | BTM | SAFE | SAFE | SAFE | SAFE | SAFE | WIN | ELIM | Guest | Guest | |
| Peke Balderas | WIN | SAFE | SAFE | SAFE | SAFE | SAFE | BTM | ELIM | | | Guest | Guest | |
| Aisha Dollkills | BTM | SAFE | ELIM | | | IN | ELIM | | | | Guest | Guest | |
| Light King | SAFE | SAFE | IMM | SAFE | SAFE | SAFE | QUIT | | | | Guest | Guest | |
| Huma Kyle | ELIM | SAFE | IMM | IMM | ELIM | OUT | | | | | Guest | LMQ | |
| Isabella y Catalina | SAFE | SAFE | IMM | ELIM | | OUT | | | | | Guest | Guest | |
| Deseos Fab | SAFE | ELIM | | | | OUT | | | | | Guest | Guest | |

=== Scores history ===
Summary of weekly voting and results
| Contestant | Episode | | | | | | | | | | Total |
| Contestant | 1 | 2 | 3 | 4 | 5 | 6 | 7 | 8 | 9 | 10 | Total |
|---|---|---|---|---|---|---|---|---|---|---|---|
| Fifí Estah | 16 | 20 | 19 | 14 | 18 | 9 | 14 | 11 | 16 | 20 | 157 |
| Hidden Mistake | 16 | 15 | 15 | 17 | 13 | 8 | 20 | 15 | 16 | 16 | 151 |
| Liza Zan Zuzzi | 18 | 15 | 17 | 6 | 19 | 19 | 18 | 16 | 19 | 16 | 163 |
| Paper Cut | | 16 | 16 | 19 | 18 | 20 | 19 | 18 | 18 | 19 | 163 |
| Santa Lucía | 13 | 7 | 15 | 19 | 8 | 17 | 16 | 20 | 16 | 18 | 149 |
| Gretha White | 15 | 13 | 8 | 16 | 15 | 12 | 17 | 19 | 20 | 12 | 147 |
| Peke Balderas | 19 | 19 | 18 | 15 | 17 | 15 | 10 | 8 | | | 121 |
| Aisha Dollkills | 7 | 14 | 12 | | | | 12 | | | | 45 |
| Light King | 16 | 14 | 6 | 18 | 18 | 18 | 8 | | | | 98 |
| Huma Kyle | 8 | 10 | 10 | 8 | 12 | | | | | | 48 |
| Isabella y Catalina | 12 | 17 | 17 | 10 | | | | | | | 56 |
| Deseos Fab | 14 | 8 | | | | | | | | | 22 |

== Lip syncs ==
Legend:

The contestant was eliminated after their first time in the bottom.
The contestant was eliminated after their second time in the bottom.
The contestant was eliminated after their third time in the bottom.

| Episode | Contestants | | | Song | Eliminated |
|---|---|---|---|---|---|
| 1 | Aisha Dollkills | vs. | Huma Kyle | "Mexa" (Yari Mejía) | Huma Kyle |
| 2 | Deseos Fab | vs. | Santa Lucía | "One, Two, Three, Go!" (Belanova) | Deseos Fab |
| 3 | Aisha Dollkills | vs. | Gretha White | "Tu falta de querer" (Mon Laferte) | Aisha Dollkills |
| 4 | Isabella y Catalina | vs. | Liza Zan Zuzzi | "Estilazo" (Marshmello, Tokischa) | Isabella y Catalina |
| 5 | Huma Kyle | vs. | Santa Lucía | "Mírame" (Edith Márquez) | Huma Kyle |
| 6 (Note: Instead of the typical bottom two, Hidden Mistake was declared as the worst contestant of the week and asked to lip sync against the best one of the eliminated contestants, Aisha Dollkills. Both of them were declared as the winners of the lip sync, resulting in Aisha returning to the competition and Hidden being allowed to stay.) | Aisha Dollkills | vs. | Hidden Mistake | "Ojos así" (Shakira) | None |
| 7 (Note: Originally, in episode 7, a three-way lip sync with a double elimination was planned but, after Light King quit the competition, the contestants took part in a regular lip sync, which was broadcast at the beginning of episode 8.) | Aisha Dollkills | vs. | Peke Balderas | "Las solteras" (Lola Índigo) | Aisha Dollkills |
| 8 | Fifí Estah | vs. | Peke Balderas | "Cariñito" (Lila Downs) | Peke Balderas |
| 10 (Note: All the contestants had to lipsync to make it to the finale even though no-one was in the bottom.) | Paper Cut | vs. | Santa Lucía | "Mangú" (Becky G) | None |
| 10 | Fifí Estah | vs. | Liza Zan Zuzzi | "No mienten" (Becky G) | None |
| 10 | Gretha White | vs. | Hidden Mistake | "Fulanito" (Becky G, El Alfa) | Gretha White |
| 10 | Gretha White | vs. | Hidden Mistake | "Fulanito" (Becky G, El Alfa) | Hidden Mistake |

== Judges ==
=== Main judges ===
- Yari Mejía, designer, stylist, singer and model
- Bernardo "Letal" Vázquez, drag queen and professional makeup artist
- Raquel Martínez, actress and dancer

=== Guest judges ===
Listed in chronological order.

- Roberto Carlo, actor, television judge, and host of the fourth season of La Más Draga
- El Escorpión Dorado, internet personality
- Mon Laferte, singer, composer and painter
- Natalia Téllez, internet personality
- Edith Márquez, singer and actress
- Paulina Goto, actress, singer, and television hostess
- María León, actress, singer, and dancer
- Lila Downs, singer-songwriter
- Laura León, actress and singer
- Jhonny Caz, singer and member of regional Mexican band Grupo Firme
- Anahí, singer and actress
- Ricky Lips, drag performer and celebrity impersonator
- Tía Fer, winner of La Más Draga online contest

=== Special guests ===
Guests who will appear in episodes, but not judge on the main stage.

Episode 1

- Pablo Solano, photographer

Episode 5

- Alfonso González, Uber México's representative
- Paola Gómez, actress and singer

Episode 6

- Alaín Pinzón, activist and VIHve Libre's representative

Episode 7

- Jano, Internet personality
- Quecho Muñoz, actor, singer, and writer
- Yeyonce Maldonado, choreographer

Episode 8

- Salma Luévano, politician and LGBT+ activist

Episode 9

- Claudia Garibay, Queen Skittles' representative
- Gerardo Zaldivar, Comex's representative

Episode 11

- Georgiana, contestant and La Más Querida on season 4

Episode 12

- Diana Deskrados and Luis, PrideMx's representatives
- Paola Gómez, singer and actress
- Rebel Mörk, winner of season 4

== Episodes ==
| No. overall | No. in season | Title | Original release date |
|---|---|---|---|
| 40 | 1 | "La Más Artesanal" | 27 September 2022 |
Eleven Mexican drag queens enter the workroom. For the first mini-challenge, the queens will do a Axolotl inspired photoshoot underwater. It is revealed that everyone is the winner of the mini-challenge. For the main challenge, the queens will present a look inspired by Mexican handcrafts and folk art. The Mexican handcrafts and folk art inspirations were as follows: Aisha Dollkills - Alebrijes; Deseos Fab - Alfarería (Pottery); Fifí Estah - Móvil de Conchas (Seashell Mobile); Gretha White - Orfebrería (Goldsmithing); Hidden Mistake - Talavera de Puebla; Huma Kyle - Talavera de Puebla; Isabella y Catalina - Sarapes; Light King - Arte Huichol; Liza Zan Zuzzi - Platería de Taxco (Silversmithing from Taxco); Peke Balderas - Piñatas; Santa Lucía - Judas de Cartonería; On the runway, category is La Más Artesanal (The Most Artisinal). Liza Zan Zuzzi and Peke Balderas receive positive critiques, with Peke Balderas winning the challenge. Aisha Dollkills, Huma Kyle and Isabella y Catalina receive negative critiques, with Isabella y Catalina being safe. Aisha Dollkills and Huma Kyle lip-sync to "Mexa" by Yari Mejía. Aisha Dollkills wins the lip-sync and Huma Kyle is the first queen to sashay away. After the elimination, the queens re-enter the workroom, to find season 4's queen Paper Cut in the workroom.: Guest Judge: Roberto Carlo; Mini-Challenge: Axolotl inspired photoshoot underwater; Mini-Challenge Winner: Everyone; Main Challenge: Present a look inspired by Mexican handcrafts and folk art; Runway Theme: La Más Artesanal (The Most Artisanal); Challenge Winner: Peke Balderas; Challenge Prize: A $5,000 cash tip; Bottom Two: Aisha Dollkills and Huma Kyle; Lip-Sync Song: "Mexa" by Yari Mejía; Eliminated: Huma Kyle
| 41 | 2 | "La Más Juguete" | 5 October 2022 |
Picking up from the cliffhanger last week, it is announced that Paper Cut will be returning to compete in this season. It is also announced that previously eliminated queen, Huma Kyle, will be returning to the competition. For this week's mini-challenge, the queens will participate in a trivia game called "No La Cagues" (Don't Shit the Bed). For the main challenge, the queens will present a look inspired by traditional Mexican handcrafted toys. The Mexican handcrafted toys inspirations were as follows: Aisha Dollkills - Balero (Cup and Ball); Deseos Fab - Marioneta; Fifí Estah - Boxeadores de Madera (Wood Boxers); Gretha White - Matatena (Knucklebones); Hidden Mistake - Tamborín de Madera (Pellet Drum); Huma Kyle - Pirinola; Isabella y Catalina - Luchadores de Plástico (Toy Wrestlers); Light King - Piñatas; Liza Zan Zuzzi - Atrapanovios; Paper Cut - Rehilete; Peke Balderas - Trompo; Santa Lucía - Yo-yo; On the runway, category is La Más Jueguete (The Most Toy). Fifí Estah, Isabella y Catalina and Peke Balderas receive positive critiques, with Fifí Estah winning the challenge. Deseos Fab, Huma Kyle and Santa Lucía receive negative critiques, with Huma Kyle being safe. Deseos Fab and Santa Lucía lip-sync to "One, Two, Three, Go!" by Belanova. Santa Lucía wins the lip-sync and Deseos Fab sashays away.: Guest Judge: El Escorpión Dorado; Entered: Paper Cut; Returned: Huma Kyle; Mini-Challenge: Participate in a trivia game called "No La Cagues" (Don't Shit the Bed); Main Challenge: Present a look inspired by traditional Mexican handcrafted toys; Runway Theme: La Más Jueguete (The Most Toy); Challenge Winner: Fifí Estah; Challenge Prize: A $5,000 cash tip; Bottom Two: Deseos Fab and Santa Lucía; Lip-Sync Song: "One, Two, Three, Go!" by Belanova; Eliminated: Deseos Fab
| 42 | 3 | "La Más A Color" | 12 October 2022 |
For this week's mini-challenge, the queens will team up and improv in short sketches, developing a dramatic case, parodying court show Caso Cerrado. Hidden Mistake, Huma Kyle, Isabella y Catalina, Light King and Paper Cut win the mini-challenge, and earn immunity from elimination this episode. For the main challenge, the queens will present a black and white look that reveals into a full color look, inspired by Guillermo González Camarena. On the runway, category is La Más A Color (The Most in Color). Fifí Estah is announced as the winner of the challenge. Aisha Dollkills and Gretha White receive negative critiques, and are announced as the bottom two. They lip-sync to "Tu falta de querer" by Mon Laferte. Gretha White wins the lip-sync and Aisha Dollkills sashays away.: Guest Judge: Mon Laferte; Mini-Challenge: Improv in short sketches developing a dramatic case, parodying court show Caso Cerrado; Mini-Challenge Winners: Hidden Mistake, Huma Kyle, Isabella y Catalina, Light King and Paper Cut; Mini-Challenge Prize: Immunity from elimination; Main Challenge: Present a black and white look that reveals into a full color look, inspired by Guillermo González Camarena; Runway Theme: La Más A Color (The Most In Color); Challenge Winner: Fifí Estah; Challenge Prize: A $5,000 cash tip; Bottom Two: Aisha Dollkills and Gretha White; Lip-Sync Song: "Tu falta de querer" by Mon Laferte; Eliminated: Aisha Dollkills
| 43 | 4 | "La Más Recursiva" | 19 October 2022 |
For this week's mini-challenge, the queens will search for a lipstick hidden in haystacks. Huma Kyle wins the mini-challenge, and earns immunity from elimination this episode. For the main challenge, the queens will present a look using a variety of resources provided by the production team. On the runway, category is La Más Recursiva (The Most Resourceful). Light King, Paper Cut and Santa Lucía receive positive critiques, with Paper Cut and Santa Lucía both winning the challenge. Huma Kyle, Isabella y Catalina and Liza Zan Zuzzi receive negative critiques, with Huma Kyle being safe, because of her immunity. Isabella y Catalina and Liza Zan Zuzzi lip-sync to "Estilazo" by Marshmello and Tokischa. Liza Zan Zuzzi wins the lip-sync and Isabella y Catalina sashays away.: Guest Judge: Natalia Téllez; Mini-Challenge: Search for a lipstick hidden in haystacks; Mini-Challenge Winners: Huma Kyle; Mini-Challenge Prize: Immunity from elimination; Main Challenge: Present a look using a variety of resources provided by the production team; Runway Theme: La Más Recursiva (The Most Resourceful); Challenge Winners: Paper Cut and Santa Lucía; Challenge Prize: A $5,000 cash tip; Bottom Two: Isabella y Catalina and Liza Zan Zuzzi; Lip-Sync Song: "Estilazo" by Marshmello and Tokischa; Eliminated: Isabella y Catalina
| 44 | 5 | "La Más Famosa" | 25 October 2022 |
For this week's mini-challenge, the queens pair up and get four Uber drivers in drag, then improvise with them in a 90-second skit involving an Uber ride. Fifí Estah, Hidden Mistake and Light King win the mini-challenge, with all three of them earning 3 stars to their final challenge score. For the main challenge, the queens will impersonate a celebrity on the runway, as well as play in La Draga Más Débil, based on El Rival Más Débil, the Mexican version of The Weakest Link. The celebrities the queens impersonated were as follows: Fifí Estah as Lolita Ayala; Gretha White as Luna Gil; Hidden Mistake as La Chilindrina; Huma Kyle as Federica de P. Luche; Light King as La Veneno; Liza Zan Zuzzi as Tere "La Secretaria"; Paper Cut as Doña Lucha; Peke Balderas as Paulina Rubio; Santa Lucía as María Félix; On the runway, category is La Más Famosa (The Most Famous). Liza Zan Zuzzi, Paper Cut and Peke Balderas receive positive critiques, with Liza Zan Zuzzi winning the challenge. Huma Kyle, Hidden Mistake and Santa Lucía receive negative critiques, with Hidden Mistake being safe. Huma Kyle and Santa Lucía lip-sync to "Mírame" by Edith Márquez. Santa Lucía wins the lip-sync and Huma Kyle sashays away.: Guest Judge: Edith Márquez; Mini-Challenge: In teams, get four Uber drivers in drag and then improvise with them in a 90 second skit involving an Uber ride; Mini-Challenge Winners: Fifí Estah, Hidden Mistake and Light King; Mini-Challenge Prize: A new wig and 3 extra stars added to their final challenge score; Main Challenge: Impersonate a celebrity on the runway, as well as play in La Draga Más Débil, based on El Rival Más Débil, the Mexican version of The Weakest Link; Runway Theme: La Más Famosa (The Most Famous); Challenge Winner: Liza Zan Zuzzi; Challenge Prize: A $5,000 cash tip and $10,000 donated to their assigned organization; Bottom Two: Huma Kyle and Santa Lucía; Lip-Sync Song: "Mírame" by Edith Márquez; Eliminated: Huma Kyle
| 45 | 6 | "La Más del Toro" | 1 November 2022 |
For this week's mini-challenge, the queens pair up for dueling, try to push each other out from their pedestal in an inflatable boxing ring. Fifí Estah, Liza Zan Zuzzi, Paper Cut and Light King win the mini-challenge. For the main challenge, all eliminated contestants return for a chance to re-enter the competition; the queens will present a look inspired by a character from the works of Mexican filmmaker Guillermo del Toro. The Guillermo del Toro film inspirations were as follows: Aisha Dollkills - Don't Be Afraid of the Dark; Deseos Fab - Hellboy II: The Golden Army; Fifí Estah - Scary Stories to Tell in the Dark; Gretha White - Pan's Labyrinth; Hidden Mistake - Crimson Peak; Huma Kyle - Pan's Labyrinth; Isabella y Catalina - Mama; Light King - Hellboy; Liza Zan Zuzzi - The Witches; Paper Cut - Pan's Labyrinth; Peke Balderas - Hellboy II: The Golden Army; Santa Lucía - Hellboy; On the runway, category is La Más del Toro (The Most del Toro). After the critiques, Paper Cut wins the challenge, while Hidden Mistake was the week's worst. Huma Kyle was declared the best among the eliminated queens, but later declined the offer, meaning that the next eliminated queen with the best score, Aisha Dollkills, was declared the best. Instead of the typical lip-sync, Aisha Dollkills was asked to challenge Hidden Mistake in a lip-sync to re-enter the competition. Aisha Dollkills and Hidden Mistake lip-sync to "Ojos Así" by Shakira. Both queens win the lip-sync, meaning that Aisha Dollkills will officially return to the competition.: Guest Judge: Paulina Goto; Mini-Challenge: In pairs, try to push each other out from their pedestal in an inflatable boxing ring; Mini-Challenge Winners: Fifí Estah, Liza Zan Zuzzi, Paper Cut and Light King; Main Challenge: Present a look inspired by the works of Mexican filmmaker Guillermo del Toro; Runway Theme: La Más del Toro (The Most del Toro); Challenge Winner: Paper Cut; Challenge Prize: A $5,000 cash tip; Bottom One: Hidden Mistake; Aspiring Returner: Aisha Dollkills; Lip-Sync Song: "Ojos Así" by Shakira; Returned: Aisha Dollkills; Eliminated: None
| 46 | 7 | "La Más Tejocote" | 8 November 2022 |
For the main challenge the queens will record vocals and perform in ¡Chale, Lo hice otra vez!, a musical inspired by the songs of Britney Spears. The Britney Spears songs inspirations, and their revised versions as well, were as follows: Aisha Dollkils - "Toxic" (Tóxico); Fifí Estah - "I'm a Slave 4 U" (Esclava para ti); Greta White - "Lucky" (Suertuda); Hidden Mistake - "...Baby One More Time" (Neni, préñame otra vez); Light King - "I'm Not a Girl, Not Yet a Woman" (Niña no soy, mujer tampoco); Liza Zan Zuzzi - "Womanizer" (Mujeriego); Paper Cut - "Oops!... I Did It Again" (¡Chale, Lo hice otra vez); Peke Balderas - "Gimme More" (Dame más); Santa Lucía - "Work Bitch" (Trabaje perre); On the runway, category is La Más Tejocote (The Most Hawthorn). Hidden Mistake, Liza Zan Zuzzi and Paper Cut receive positive critiques, with Hidden Mistake winning the challenge. Aisha Dollkills, Light King and Peke Balderas receive negative critiques, with all three being in the bottom. Maca Carriedo then tells them that only one queen will survive this lip-sync, with the other two getting eliminated. However, before the start of lip-sync, Light King decides to quit the competition and left the main stage.: Guest Judge: María León; Main Challenge: Record vocals and perform in ¡Chale, Lo hice otra vez!; Runway Theme: La Más Tejocote (The Most Hawthorn); Challenge Winner: Hidden Mistake; Challenge Prize: A $5,000 cash tip; Bottom Three: Aisha Dollkills, Light King, Peke Balderas; Quit: Light King
| 47 | 8 | "La Más Futurista" | 15 November 2022 |
Picking up from the events of the previous episode, the judges allow Light King to quit and then proceed to announce that the lip-sync between Aisha Dollkills and Peke Balderas will continue. They lip-sync to "Las solteras" by Lola Índigo. Peke Balderas wins the lip-sync and Aisha Dollkills sashays away. The next week, the queens participate in a mini-challenge called 'La Drag Ensebada' in which they must climb up a greased pole and grab a pair of pantyhose with the help of the past contestants they've been assigned. Fifí Estah and Hidden Mistake win the mini-challenge. For the main challenge, the queens must work with their partner to create a futuristic talent show performance. The pairs assigned are as follows: Fifí Estah and C-Pher; Greta White and Aurora Wonders; Hidden Mistake and Vera Cruz; Liza Zan Zuzzi and Iris XC; Paper Cut and Leexa Fox; Peke Balderas and Aviesc Who?; Santa Lucía and Georgiana; On the runway, category is La Más Futurista (The Most Futuristic). Gretha White, Paper Cut and Santa Lucía receive positive critiques, with Santa Lucía winning the challenge. Fifí Estah, Hidden Mistake and Peke Balderas receive negative critiques, with Hidden Mistake being safe. Fifí Estah and Peke Balderas lipsync to "Cariñito" by Lila Downs. Fifí Estah wins the lip-sync and Peke Balderas sashays away.: Bottom Two: Aisha Dollkills and Peke Balderas; Lip-Sync Song: "Las solteras" by Lola Índigo; Eliminated: Aisha Dollkills; Guest Judge: Lila Downs; Mini-Challenge: Paired with a past contestant, climb up a greased pole and grab a pair of pantyhose; Mini-Challenge Winners: Fifí Estah and Hidden Mistake; Mini-Challenge Prize: A $5,000 cash tip; Main Challenge: Paired with a past contestant, present an avant-garde futuristic show; Runway Theme: La Más Futurista (The Most Futuristic); Challenge Winner: Santa Lucía; Challenge Prize: A $5,000 cash tip; Bottom Two: Fifí Estah and Peke Balderas; Lip-Sync Song: "Cariñito" by Lila Downs; Eliminated: Peke Balderas
| 48 | 9 | "La Más Lele" | 22 November 2022 |
For the main challenge, the queens will give to women with dwarfism a drag makeover, in the style of Mexican rag doll, also known as "Lele Dolls" and present their looks on the main stage. On the runway, category is La Más Lele (The Most Mexican Rag Doll). Gretha White, Liza Zan Zuzzi and Paper Cut receive positive critiques, with Gretha White winning the challenge. The rest of the queens are also praised during the critiques. The judges, citing the difficulty in naming the bottom two, reveal that there will be no elimination this week, and all the queens will advance the semifinals.: Guest Judge: Laura León; Main Challenge: Makeover women with dwarfism into Lele Dolls, traditional Mexican rag dolls.; Runway Theme: La Más Lele (The Most Mexican Rag Doll); Challenge Winner: Gretha White; Challenge Prize: A $5,000 cash tip; Eliminated: None
| 49 | 10 | "La Más Monja Coronada" | 29 November 2022 |
For this week's mini-challenge, the queens must create a design and a mural of the Gates of Hell in pairs. Paper Cut and Santa Lucía wine the mini-challenge. For the main challenge, the queens must present a look inspired the Mexican Baroque tradition of Monja Coronada portraits, which must then reveal into a sexy Satan-inspired look. On the runway, category is La Más Monja Coronada (The Most Crowned Nun). Fifí Estah, Paper Cut and Santa Lucía receive positive critiques, with Fifí Estah winning the challenge. Gretha White, Hidden Mistake and Liza Zan Zuzzi receive negative critiques. However, the judges reveal that all of the contestants must participate and win a Lip-sync Battle Royale Smackdown to proceed to the finale. Firstly, Paper Cut and Santa Lucía lip-sync to "Mangú" by Becky G, with both declared the winners of the lip-sync. Then, Fifí Estah and Liza Zan Zuzzi lip-sync to "No Mienten" by Becky G, with both declared the winners of the lip-sync. Lastly, Gretha White and Hidden Mistake lip-sync to "Fulanito" by Becky G and El Alfa, however no one is declared the winner, leaving the both of them to sashay away.: Guest Judge: Jhonny Caz; Mini-Challenge In pairs, paint a mural representing the Gates of Hell.; Mini-Challenge Winners Paper Cut and Santa Lucía; Mini-Challenge Prize MXN $10,000 cash tip; Main Challenge: Present a look inspired by the Crowned Nun Portraits that then reveals into a sexy demonic look; Runway Theme: La Más Monja Coronada (The Most Crowned Nun); Challenge Winner: Fifí Estah; Challenge Prize: A $5,000 cash tip; Lip-Sync Songs: "Mangú" by Becky G, "No Mienten" by Becky G and "Fulanito" by Becky G and El Alfa; Eliminated: Gretha White and Hidden Mistake
| 50 | 11 | "Día de Muertas" | 6 December 2022 |
All the queens, after walking the runway on the category Día de Muertas (Day of the Dead), return to talk about what happened this season. Discussions include, Deseos Fab's tense elimination, her fight with Gretha White and feeling betrayed by Peke Balderas, Isabella y Catalina's rushed lip-sync against Liza Zan Zuzzi and feeling screwed over by the producers, Hume Kyle being the most viral queen, her messy track record and her drama with Santa Lucía, Light King's decision to quit and feeling unfairly critiqued by Raquel Martínez, Aisha Dollkill's dispute with Aviesc Who?, Peke Balderas' conflict with the Top 6 and the rumors about her supposedly spoiling the season, Hidden Mistake's preparation for the show and feeling that she was too harshly critiqued, Gretha White not posting anything about the show. Liza Zan Zuzzi's romantic fling with Huma Kyle and apparently being favored by the producers, Paper Cut's harsh criticism he received upon his return and comparing his experience on both of his seasons, Fifí Estah's dance background and her not paying attention to all the hateful remarks from Aviesc Who? and Santa Lucía receiving several death threats during the season and losing her safe space with drag. Before the reunion ends, Santa Lucía reveals that she will not be competing in this season's finale.: Runway Theme: Día de Muertas (Day of the Dead); Quit: Santa Lucía
| 51 | 12 | "La Gran Final" | 13 December 2022 |
At the beginning of the episode, it is announced that Hidden Mistake, who was eliminated in the semi-finals, will be returning to the competition, due to Santa Lucía's withdrawal in the reunion episode. For the final challenge of the season, the queens will produce, direct, and star in their own original performance on an original track recorded by themselves with DJ Neiko, and then present a look inspired by Mexican culture. The queens Mexican Culture inspirations were as follows: Fifí Estah - Fiesta; Hidden Mistake - Day of the Dead; Liza Zan Zuzzi - Palacio de Bellas Artes; Paper Cut - Piñatas; The queens walk the runway one last time. It is revealed that Huma Kyle is this season's La Más Querida (Miss Congeniality). It is then revealed that Fifí Estah is this season's La Más Volada (a prize sponsored by Viva Aerobus). It is announced that Fifí Estah is the winner, leaving Hidden Mistake, Liza Zan Zuzzi and Paper Cut as the runners-up.: Guest Judges: Anahí, Ricky Lips and Tía Fer; Main Challenge: Produce, direct, and star in their own original performance on an original track recorded by themselves with DJ Neiko and present a look inspired by Mexican Culture; Runway Theme: Lo Que Más Amo De México (What I Most Love About Mexico); La Más Querida: Huma Kyle; La Más Volada: Fifí Estah; Runners-up: Hidden Mistake, Liza Zan Zuzzi and Paper Cut; Winner of La Más Draga Season Five: Fifí Estah
