= La Más Draga =

Mexican reality television series

- Genre: Reality competition
- Directed by: Carlo Villarreal; Bruno Olvez
- Presented by: Lorena Herrera; Vanessa Claudio; Karla Díaz-Leal Arreguín; Roberto Carlo; Maca Carriedo; Marisol González; Karime Pindter
- Judges: Jhonny Carmona; Yarí Mejía; Bernardo "Letal" Vázquez; Ricky Lips; Raquel Martínez; Natalia Sosa
- Country of origin: Mexico
- Original language: Spanish
- No. of seasons: 7
- No. of episodes: 75

Production
- Producers: Carlo Villarreal; Bruno Olvez
- Camera setup: Multi-camera
- Running time: 45–95 minutes
- Production company: La Gran Diabla Productions

Original release
- Network: YouTube
- Release: 8 May 2018 – present

Related
- La Más Draga: Solo Las Más

La Más Draga ('The Draggest') is a Mexican reality competition television series, where different drag queens compete by performing various challenges week after week to find La Más Draga of Mexico and Latin America, through different tests, whether it be singing, acting, comedy or dancing. The objective of the program is to make Mexico's drag art visible, with challenges that exalt Mexican culture. Every week a contestant is eliminated through a lipsync. The program is transmitted exclusively through YouTube.

== Production ==
=== Format ===
The reality competition show is set as to have weekly challenges to eliminate the participants and thus find the best one. Each week the contestants face a series of challenges, guided and advised by Juan Carmona and guests. Each episode there is a mini-challenge and a runway walk according to a theme of Mexican culture where each participant demonstrates their versatility. The judges evaluate them in a gala where the two participants with the lowest score will go straight to lipsync, where only one participant will be saved. The eliminated one goes to the "drag-altar" where she will be the most dreamed of and forever remembered. La Más Draga of all Mexico is chosen from among the last three finalists.

=== Judges ===
Judges on La Más Draga
Judge	Season						
Judge	1	2	3	4	5	6	7
Jhonny Carmona	Main	Main	Main				
Yari Mejía	Main	Main	Main	Main	Main	Main	Main
Bernardo "Letal" Vázquez	Main	Main	Main	Main	Main	Main	Main
Ricky Lips				Main			
Raquel Martínez					Main	Main	
Natalia Sosa							Main

=== Coaches ===
Coaches on La Más Draga
Judge	Season						
Judge	1	2	3	4	5	6	7
Jhonny Carmona	Main	Main	Main	Main	Main	Main	Main
Paris Bang Bang		Main					
Ricardo "Pepe" Peralta			Main	Main			
César "Teo" Doroteo			Main	Main			
Rogelio Suárez					Main		
Alexis 3XL						Main	Main

== Series overview ==
Season	Contestants	Episodes	Originally released		Winner	Runner(s)-up	La Más Querida	La Más Volada
Season	Contestants	Episodes	First released	Last released	Winner	Runner(s)-up	La Más Querida	La Más Volada
1	7	7	8 May 2018	19 June 2018	Deborah La Grande	Bárbara Durango; Eva Blunt; Margaret Y Ya	Debra Men	—N/a
2	9	9	30 April 2019	25 June 2019	Alexis 3XL	Gvajardo; Sophia Jiménez	Amelia	Amelia
3	13	11	22 September 2020	1 December 2020	Aviesc Who?	Madison; Raga Diamante; Rudy Reyes	Wynter	Luna Lansman
4	14	12	21 September 2021	8 December 2021	Rebel Mörk	C-Pher; Elektra Vandergeld; Iris XC	Georgiana	Paper Cut
5	12	12	27 September 2022	13 December 2022	Fifí Estah	Hidden Mistake; Liza Zan Zuzzi; Paper Cut	Huma Kyle	Fifí Estah
6	14	12	12 September 2023	28 November 2023	Cattriona	Aries; Electra Walpurgis; Juana Guadalupe	La Kyliezz	—N/a
7	14	12	30 September 2025	16 December 2025	Nayla Downs	Deetox Alanís; Moon; Tulsa	Caos Lascivia	—N/a

=== Season 1 (2018) ===
The first season of La Más Draga premiered on 8 May 2018 throughout YouTube. The season ran for seven episodes and concluded on 19 June 2018. Debra Men was voted as La Más Querida. Bárbara Durango, Eva Blunt, and Margaret Y Ya were the runner-ups, and Deborah La Grande was the winner of the first season.

=== Season 2 (2019) ===
The second season of La Más Draga premiered on 30 April 2019 throughout YouTube. The season ran for nine episodes and concluded on 25 June 2019. Amelia was voted as La Más Querida and La Más Volada. Gvajardo and Sophia Jiménez were the runner-ups, and Alexis 3XL was the winner of the second season.

=== Season 3 (2020) ===
The third season of La Más Draga premiered on 23 September 2020 throughout YouTube. The season ran for eleven episodes and concluded on 1 December 2020. Wynter was voted as La Más Querida and Luna Lansman as La Más Volada. Madison, Raga Diamante and Rudy Reyes were the runner-ups, and Aviesc Who? was the winner of the third season.

=== Season 4 (2021) ===
The fourth season of La Más Draga premiered on 21 September 2021 throughout YouTube. The season ran for twelve episodes and concluded on 8 December 2021. Georgiana was voted as La Más Querida and Paper Cut as La Más Volada. C-Pher, Elektra Vandergeld and Iris XC were the runner-ups, and Rebel Mörk was the winner of the fourth season.

=== Season 5 (2022) ===
The fifth season of La Más Draga premiered on 27 September 2022 throughout YouTube. The season ran for twelve episodes and concluded on 13 December 2022. Huma Kyle was voted as La Más Querida and Fifí Estah as La Más Volada. Hidden Mistake, Liza Zan Zuzzi and Paper Cut were the runner-ups, and Fifí Estah was the winner of the fifth season.

=== Season 6 (2023) ===
The sixth season of La Más Draga premiered on 12 September 2023 throughout YouTube. The season ran for twelve episodes and concluded on 28 November 2023. La Kyliezz was voted as La Más Querida. Aries, Electra Walpurgis and Juana Guadalupe were the runner-ups, and Cattriona was the winner of the sixth season.

=== Season 7 (2025) ===
The seventh season of La Más Draga premiered on 30 September 2025 throughout YouTube. The season ran for twelve episodes and concluded on 16 December 2025. Caos Lascivia was voted as La Más Querida. Deetox Alanís, Moon and Tulsa were the runner-ups, and Nayla Downs was the winner of the seventh season.
