= La Más Draga season 4 =

La Más Draga
- Season 4
- Promotional poster for season four
- Hosted by: Roberto Carlo
- Judges: Bernardo "Letal" Vázquez; Ricky Lips; Yari Mejía
- No. of contestants: 14
- Winner: Rebel Mörk
- Runners-up: C-Pher; Elektra Vandergeld; Iris XC
- No. of episodes: 12

Release
- Original network: YouTube
- Original release: 21 September – 8 December 2021

Season chronology
- ← Previous; Season 3 Next → Season 5

The fourth season of La Más Draga premiered on 21 September and concluded on 8 December 2021. The competition was broadcast on YouTube, and was produced by La Gran Diabla Producciones. The series featured fourteen contestants, from all over Mexico, competing for the title of La Más Draga of Mexico and Latin America and a cash prize of $250,000 MXN Pesos. The winner of the fourth season of La Más Draga was Rebel Mörk, with C-Pher, Elektra Vandergeld and Iris XC as runners-up.

The judges panel of this season include Mexican singer and actor Roberto Carlo, who was also the main host, hair and makeup artist Yari Mejía, and drag performers Bernardo "Letal" Vázquez and Ricky Lips.

The season consisted of twelve one-hour episodes.

Like the previous season, the castings were followed by a Live Audition held in Mexico City, from which the first ten contestants were selected. Following the airing of the live auditions on March 9, 2021, Georgiana was the only contestant to be confirmed to be cast for the series. The final three contestants, also known as "Secret Contestants", were invited to participate directly by the show's production, and were announced during the premiere.

== Contestants ==
Ages, names, and cities stated are at time of filming.

Contestants of La Más Draga season 4 and their backgrounds
Contestant	Age	Hometown	Outcome
Rebel Mörk	23	Monterrey, Nuevo León	Winner
C-Pher	29	Santiago, Chile	Runners-up
Elektra Vandergeld	24	Ensenada, Baja California	Runners-up
Iris XC (Note: Iris XC Queen is referred to as Iris XC on the show.)	26	Chihuahua City, Chihuahua	Runners-up
La Morra Lisa	28	Zacatecas, Zacatecas	5th place
Leexa Fox	20	Mexicali, Baja California	5th place
Lupita Kush	23	Guadalajara, Jalisco	7th place
Georgiana (Note: Georgiana Vagina is referred to as Georgiana on the show.)	31	Monterrey, Nuevo León	8th place (Note: Georgiana was voted La Más Querida.)
Vera Cruz	24	Monterrey, Nuevo León	8th place
Tiresias	33	Mexico City	10th place
Paper Cut	24	Mexico City	11th place (Note: Paper Cut was voted La Más Volada.)
Sirena	30	Guadalajara, Jalisco	12th place
La Carrera (Note: La Carrera Mami is referred to as La Carrera on the show.)	37	Acapulco, Guerrero	13th place
Aurora Wonders	31	Mexico City	14th place

== Contestant progress ==
Legend:

Rebel Mörk won Las Más Draga season 4.
C-Pher, Elektra Vandergeld and Iris XC were the runners-up.
Georgiana was voted was voted La Más Querida (LMQ).
Paper Cut was voted La Más Volada (LMV).
WIN indicates the contestant received the highest score of the episode and won the challenge.
SAFE indicates that the contestant was declared safe by the judges.
BTM (Bottom) indicates that the contestant received one of the lowest scores of the episode and was up for elimination.
BTM (Bottom) indicates that the contestant was safe, but, due to the decision of the previous episode's guest judge, was up for elimination.
ELIM (Eliminated) indicates that the contestant received one of the lowest scores of the episode and was eliminated.
Guest indicates that the contestant returned as a guest.

Progress of contestants including rank/position in each episode
Contestant	Episode											
Contestant	1	2	3	4	5	6	7	8	9	10	11	12
Rebel Mörk	SAFE	SAFE	SAFE	SAFE	SAFE	SAFE	SAFE	WIN	SAFE	BTM	Guest	Winner
C-Pher	SAFE	WIN	SAFE	SAFE	SAFE	SAFE	SAFE	SAFE	WIN	WIN	Guest	Runner-up
Elektra Vandergeld	SAFE	SAFE	SAFE	WIN	SAFE	SAFE	WIN	BTM	BTM	BTM	Guest	Runner-up
Iris XC	SAFE	SAFE	SAFE	SAFE	SAFE	SAFE	SAFE	SAFE	SAFE	SAFE	Guest	Runner-up
La Morra Lisa	SAFE	SAFE	SAFE	SAFE	SAFE	SAFE	BTM	SAFE	SAFE	ELIM	Guest	Guest
Leexa Fox	SAFE	SAFE	SAFE	SAFE	WIN	BTM	BTM	SAFE	SAFE	ELIM	Guest	Guest
Lupita Kush	BTM	SAFE	SAFE	BTM	SAFE	SAFE	SAFE	SAFE	ELIM		Guest	Guest
Georgiana	SAFE	BTM	BTM	SAFE	SAFE	WIN	SAFE	ELIM			Guest	LMQ
Vera Cruz		SAFE	SAFE	SAFE	SAFE	WIN	SAFE	ELIM			Guest	Guest
Tiresias	SAFE	SAFE	BTM	SAFE	BTM	ELIM					Guest	Guest
Paper Cut	SAFE	SAFE	WIN	SAFE	ELIM						Guest	LMV
Sirena	WIN	SAFE	SAFE	ELIM							Guest	Guest
La Carrera	BTM	SAFE	ELIM								Guest	Guest
Aurora Wonders		ELIM									Guest	Guest

=== Scores history ===
Summary of weekly voting and results
Contestant	Episode										Total
Contestant	1	2	3	4	5	6	7	8	9	10	Total
Rebel Mörk	13	20	16	17	15	10	15	20	12	12	150
C-Pher	12	22	17	18	18	6	13	18	19	19	162
Elektra Vandergeld	16	8	18	20	16	18	20	7	8	12	143
Iris XC	15	16	15	17	16	15	17	19	16	18	164
La Morra Lisa	15	17	15	17	10	12	11	17	18	12	144
Leexa Fox	11	15	15	15	19	7	11	15	15	12	135
Lupita Kush	7	17	11	8	13	16	16	12	7		107
Georgiana	10	6	12	14	15	19	14	7			97
Vera Cruz		16	18	11	17	19	18	7			106
Tiresias	18	15	8	12	8	5					66
Paper Cut	17	18	19	19	8						81
Sirena	19	12	14	10							55
La Carrera	7	12	10								29
Aurora Wonders		5									5

== Lip syncs ==
Legend:

The contestant was eliminated after their first time in the bottom.
The contestant was eliminated after their second time in the bottom.
The contestant was eliminated after their third time in the bottom.

Episode	Contestants			Song	Eliminated
2	Aurora Wonders	vs.	Georgiana	"Mujer Latina" (Thalía)	Aurora Wonders
3	Georgiana vs. La Carrera vs. Tiresias			"Prefiero ser su amante" (María José)	La Carrera
4	Lupita Kush	vs.	Sirena	"Rico" (Manelyk)	Sirena
5	Paper Cut	vs.	Tiresias	"Échalo pa' ca" (Sofía Reyes, Darell, Lalo Ebratt)	Paper Cut
6	Leexa Fox	vs.	Tiresias	"El espejo" (Yuri)	Tiresias
7	La Morra Lisa	vs.	Leexa Fox	"Tusa - Versión Tropical" (Laura León)	None
8	Elektra Vandergeld vs. Georgiana vs. Vera Cruz			"Chúntaros Style" (El Gran Silencio)	Georgiana
8	Elektra Vandergeld vs. Georgiana vs. Vera Cruz			"Chúntaros Style" (El Gran Silencio)	Vera Cruz
9	Elektra Vandergeld (with Wynter)	vs.	Lupita Kush (with Mista Boo)	"El patio de mi casa" (Tatiana)	Lupita Kush
9	Elektra Vandergeld (with Wynter)	vs.	Lupita Kush (with Mista Boo)	"No me quiero bañar" (Tatiana)	Lupita Kush
9	Elektra Vandergeld (with Wynter)	vs.	Lupita Kush (with Mista Boo)	"La patita Lulú" (Tatiana)	Lupita Kush
10 (Note: Due to the high number of contestants up for elimination, it was decided to hold two duels to determine the eliminations.)	La Morra Lisa	vs.	Rebel Mörk	"Sodio" (Danna Paola)	La Morra Lisa
10	Elektra Vandergeld	vs.	Leexa Fox	"En el amor hay que perdonar" (Belinda)	Leexa Fox

== Judges ==
=== Main judges ===
- Bernardo "Letal" Vázquez, drag queen and professional makeup artist
- Ricky Lips, drag performer and celebrity impersonator
- Yari Mejía, designer, stylist, singer and model

=== Guest judges ===
Listed in chronological order.

- Susana Zabaleta, soprano and actress
- Camila Sodi, singer, actress and model
- Galilea Montijo, TV host, actress and model
- Polo Morín, actor and model
- Bárbara de Regil, actress
- Yuri, singer, actress and TV host
- Regina Blandón, actress
- Capi Pérez, comedian and TV host
- Tatiana, singer, actress and TV host
- Itatí Cantoral, actress, singer and dancer
- Daniela Rodrice, Internet personality

=== Special guests ===
Guests who will appear in episodes, but not judge on the main stage.

Episode 2

- Hugo Blanquet, comedian and drag performer

Episode 4

- Fernanda Alvarez, Levi's representative
- Gustavo Helguera, designer

Episode 7

- Neiko, DJ, singer and vocal coach
- Rudy Reyes, runner-up on season 3
- Quecho Muñoz, actor, singer, and writer

Episode 9

- Nathan Damián, internet personality
- Dani Damián, internet personality

Episode 10

- Javier García, choreographer

== Episodes ==
No. overall	No. in season	Title	Original release date
28	1	"La Más Folclórica"	21 September 2021
Fourteen Mexican drag queens enter the workroom. For the first mini-challenge, the queens will play a game called "¿Quién no merece estar aquí?" ("Who doesn't deserve to be here?"). Lupita Kush wins the mini-challenge. For the main challenge, the queens will present a look and a dance performance inspired by a particular piece of Mexican culture. The Mexican culture inspirations were as follows: C-Pher - El Baile de los Chinelos (Dance of the Chinelos); Elektra Vandergeld - La Danza del Jaguar de Guerrero (The Dance of the Guerrero's Jaguar); Georgiana - La Danza de los Viejitos (Dance of the Elders); Iris XC - Viejitos de Corpus (Old Men of Corpus); La Carrera - El Baile de la Iguana (The Iguana Dance); La Morra Lisa - El Baile de Mexicapán (The Mexicapán Dance); Leexa Fox - El Calabaceado (The Calabaceado); Lupita Kush - El Jarabe Tapatío (The Tapatio Syrup); Paper Cut - Voladores de Papantla (Papantla Flyers); Rebel Mörk - Parachicos; Sirena - Danza Folclórica de Jalisco (Folkloristic Dance of Jalisco); Tiresias - La Danza del Venado (The Deer Dance); On the runway, category is La Más Folclórica (The Most Folkloristic). Paper Cut, Sirena and Tiresias receive positive critiques, with Sirena winning the challenge. Georgiana, La Carrera and Lupita Kush receive negative critiques, with Georgiana being safe. It is announced that no lip-sync will take place this week, and both La Carrera and Lupita Kush will remain in the competition. It is then announced that two surprise queens, Aurora Wonders and Vera Cruz, will be entering the competition.: Guest Judge: Susana Zabaleta; Mini-Challenge: "¿Quién no merece estar aquí?" ("Who doesn't deserve to be here?"); Mini-Challenge Winner: Lupita Kush; Main Challenge: Present a look and a dance performance inspired by a particular piece of Mexican culture; Runway Theme: La Más Folclórica (The Most Folkloristic); Challenge Winners: Sirena; Challenge Prize: A $5,000 cash tip; Bottom Two: La Carrera and Lupita Kush; Lip-Sync Song: None; Eliminated: None; Entered: Aurora Wonders and Vera Cruz
29	2	"La Más Pintada"	28 September 2021
For this week's mini-challenge, the queens will pair up and pretend to host a show at a club. C-Pher and Vera Cruz win the mini-challenge and earn 3 extra stars added to their final challenge score this week. For this week's main challenge, the queens will present a look inspired by the Mexican muralist movement born in the 1920s. The inspirations were as follows: Aurora Wonders - "La Revolución (The Revolution)" by Fabián Cháirez; C-Pher - "Cazadora de Astros (Star Huntress)" by Remedios Varo; Elektra Vandergeld - "Arte Popular (Popular Art)" by Javier Andrés; Georgiana - "Boceto María Izquierdo (Sketch María Izquierdo)" by Mar Maremoto; Iris XC - "Murales de la Frontera (Murals of the Border)"; La Carrera - "Padre Miguel (Father Miguel)" by José Clemente Orozco; La Morra Lisa - "El Tastuán y la Niña de Jerez (The Tastuán and the Jerez Girl)" by Rafael Coronel; Leexa Fox - "Murales Callejón Chinesca (Chinese Alley Murals)"; Lupita Kush - "Hombre en Llamas (Man in Flames)" by José Clemente Orozco; Paper Cut - "Hombre en Llamas (Man in Flames)" by José Clemente Orozco; Rebel Mörk - "Solo en Do (Only in Do)" by Rafael Coronel; Sirena - "Desnudo con Alcatraces (Nude with Calla Lilies)" by Diego Rivera; Tiresias - "Brija que va al Sabbath (Witch going to the Shabbat)" by Remedios Varo; Vera Cruz - "Mago Tejiendo Música (Magician Weaving Music)" by Alejandro Colunga; On the runway, category is La Más Pintada (The Most Painted). C-Pher, Paper Cut and Rebel Mörk receive positive critiques, with C-Pher winning the challenge. Aurora Wonders, Elektra Vandergeld and Georgiana receive negative critiques, with Elektra Vandergeld being safe. Aurora Wonders and Georgiana lip-sync to "Mujer Latina" by Thalía. Georgiana wins the lip-sync and Aurora Wonders is the first queen to sashay away.: Guest Judge: Camila Sodi; Mini-Challenge: Pretend to host a show at a club in pairs; Mini-Challenge Winners: C-Pher and Vera Cruz; Mini-Challenge Prize: 3 extra stars added to their final challenge score; Main Challenge: Present a look inspired by the Mexican muralist movement born in the 1920s; Runway Theme: La Más Pintada (The Most Painted); Challenge Winner: C-Pher; Challenge Prize: A $5,000 cash tip; Bottom Two: Aurora Wonders and Georgiana; Lip-Sync Song: "Mujer Latina" by Thalía; Eliminated: Aurora Wonders
30	3	"La Más Revolucionaria"	5 October 2021
For this week's mini-challenge, the queens will star in a morning talk show. Lupita Kush and Vera Cruz win the mini-challenge, and earn 3 extra stars added to their final challenge score this week. For the main challenge, the queens will present a look inspired by the Mexican Revolution. On the runway, category is La Más Revolucionaria (The Most Revolutionary). C-Pher, Elektra Vandergeld, Paper Cut and Vera Cruz receive positive critiques, with Paper Cut winning the challenge. La Carrera, Lupita Kush and Tiresias receive negative critiques, with Lupita Kush being safe. It is then announced that Georgiana will also be joining the bottom two, due to the guest judge's choice. Georgiana, La Carrera and Tiresias lip-sync to "Prefiero Ser Su Amante" by María José. Georgiana and Tiresias win the lip-sync and La Carrera sashays away.: Guest Judge: Galilea Montijo; Mini-Challenge: Star in morning talk shows; Mini-Challenge Winners: Lupita Kush and Vera Cruz; Mini-Challenge Prize: 3 extra stars added to their final challenge score; Main Challenge: Present a look inspired by the Mexican Revolution; Runway Theme: La Más Revolucionaria (The Most Revolutionary); Challenge Winner: Paper Cut; Challenge Prize: A $5,000 cash tip; Bottom Three: Georgiana, La Carrera and Tiresias; Lip-Sync Song: "Prefiero Ser Su Amante" by María José; Eliminated: La Carrera
31	4	"La Más Mezclilla"	12 October 2021
For this week's main challenge, the queens will create a look out of 5 pieces of denim clothing from Levi's On the runway, category is La Más Mezclilla (The Most Denim). C-Pher, Elektra Vandergeld and Paper Cut receive positive critiques, with Elektra Vandergeld winning the challenge. Lupita Kush, Sirena and Vera Cruz receive negative critiques, with Vera Cruz being safe. Lupita Kush and Sirena lip-sync to "Rico" by Manelyk. Lupita Kush wins the lip-sync and Sirena sashays away.: Guest Judge: Polo Morín; Main Challenge: Create a look out of 5 pieces of denim clothing from Levi's; Runway Theme: La Más Mezclilla (The Most Denim); Challenge Winner: Elektra Vandergeld; Challenge Prize: A $5,000 cash tip and a Levi's gift card valued at $10,000; Bottom Two: Lupita Kush and Sirena; Lip-Sync Song: "Rico" by Manelyk; Eliminated: Sirena
32	5	"La Más Cachuda"	19 October 2021
For this week's mini-challenge, the queens will team up and devise a funeral skit about the stigmas surrounding HIV. It is revealed that everyone is the winner of the mini-challenge. For the main challenge, the queens will present a look inspired by the cachudos, horned folkloristic figures which are part of a tradition in Santa María Coyotepec, Oaxaca. The look must include a mask that reveals into a makeup look underneath. On the runway, category is La Más Cachuda (The Most Horned). C-Pher, Leexa Fox and Vera Cruz receive positive critiques, with Leexa Fox winning the challenge. La Morra Lisa, Paper Cut and Tiresias receive negative critiques, with La Morra Lisa being safe. Paper Cut and Tiresias lip-sync to "Échalo Pa' Ca" by Sofía Reyes, Darell and Lalo Ebratt. Tiresias wins the lip-sync and Paper Cut sashays away.: Guest Judge: Bárbara de Regil; Mini-Challenge: In teams, devise a funeral skit about the stigmas surrounding HIV; Mini-Challenge Winners: Everyone; Main Challenge: Present a look inspired by the cachudos, horned folkloristic figures which are part of a tradition in Santa María Coyotepec, Oaxaca. The look must include a mask that reveals into a makeup look underneath; Runway Theme: La Más Cachuda (The Most Horned); Challenge Winner: Leexa Fox; Challenge Prize: A $5,000 cash tip; Bottom Two: Paper Cut and Tiresias; Lip-Sync Song: "Échalo Pa' Ca" by Sofía Reyes, Darell and Lalo Ebratt; Eliminated: Paper Cut
33	6	"La Más Famosa"	26 October 2021
For this week's main challenge, the queens will impersonate celebrities on the runway, and play in 99 Dragas Dijeron, based on 100 Mexican Dijeron. Team 1 consisted of C-Pher, Elektra Vandergeld, Georgiana, La Morra Lisa and Vera Cruz. Team 2 consisted of Iris XC, Leexa Fox, Lupita Kush, Rebel Mörk and Tiresias. The queens impersonated the following celebrities: C-Pher as Yari Mejía; Elektra Vandergeld as El Lonje Moco; Georgiana as Dora La Exploradora; Iris XC as La Pájara Peggy; La Morra Lisa as Paulina de la Mora; Leexa Fox as María Belén; Lupita Kush as Laura León; Rebel Mörk as Sor Juana Inés de la Cruz; Tiresias as Susana Zabaleta; Vera Cruz as Pati Chapoy; On the runway, category is La Más Famosa (The Most Famous). Team 1 is declared the winning team, with Georgiana and Vera Cruz winning the challenge. Team 2 is the losing team, with Leexa Fox and Tiresias being the bottom two. They lip-sync to "El Espejo" by Yuri. Leexa Fox wins the lip-sync and Tiresias sashays away.: Guest Judge: Yuri; Main Challenge: Impersonate celebrities on the runway, and play in 99 Dragas Dijeron, based on 100 Mexicanos Dijeron; Runway Theme: La Más Famosa (The Most Famous); Challenge Winners: Georgiana and Vera Cruz; Challenge Prize: A $5,000 cash tip; Bottom Two: Leexa Fox and Tiresias; Lip-Sync Song: "El Espejo" by Yuri; Eliminated: Tiresias
34	7	"La Más Rosa Mexicano"	2 November 2021
For this week's main challenge, the queens will perform in La Novela, El Musical.: C-Pher plays Marimar; Elektra Vandergeld plays Teresa; Georgiana plays Luz Clarita; Iris XC plays Mia Colucci; La Morra Lisa plays Lety; Leexa Fox plays Mariana and Silvana; Lupita Kush plays Tania; Rebel Mrk plays Diana Salazar; Vera Cruz plays Ana María; On the runway, category is La Más Rosa Mexicano (The Most Mexican Pink). Elektra Vandergeld, Iris XC and Vera Cruz receive positive critiques, with Elektra Vandergeld winning the challenge. C-Pher, La Morra Lisa and Leexa Fox receive negative critiques, with Leexa Fox being safe. It is then announced that Leexa Fox has a reduction of points due to the guest judge's choice, leaving her in the bottom two, instead of C-Pher. La Morra Lisa and Leexa Fox lip-sync to "Tusa - Versión Tropical" by Laura León. Both queens win the lip-sync and no one goes home.: Guest Judge: Regina Blandón; Main Challenge: La Novela, El Musical; Runway Theme: La Más Rosa Mexicano (The Most Mexican Pink); Challenge Winner: Elektra Vandergeld; Challenge Prize: A $5,000 cash tip; Bottom Two: La Morra Lisa and Leexa Fox; Lip-Sync Song: "Tusa - Versión Tropical" by Laura León; Eliminated: None
35	8	"La Más Chola"	9 November 2021
For this week's main challenge, the queens will makeover women into "cholas", the archetype of a member of a Chicano subculture associated with anti-social and criminal behavior and gang activity. On the runway, category is La Más Legendaria (The Most Buchona). C-Pher, Iris XC and Rebel Mörk receive positive critiques, with Rebel Mörk winning the challenge. Elektra Vandergeld, Georgiana and Vera Cruz receive negative critiques, and are announced as the bottom three. They lip-sync to "Chúntaros Style" by El Gran Silencio. Elektra Vandergeld wins the lip-sync and Georgiana and Vera Cruz both sashay away.: Guest Judge: Capi Pérez; Main Challenge: Makeover women into "cholas", the archetype of a member of a Chicano subculture associated with anti-social and criminal behavior and gang activity; Runway Theme: La Más Chola (The Most Chola); Challenge Winner: Rebel Mörk; Challenge Prize: A $5,000 cash tip; Bottom Three: Elektra Vandergeld, Georgiana and Vera Cruz; Lip-Sync Song: "Chúntaros Style" by El Gran Silencio; Eliminated: Georgiana and Vera Cruz
36	9	"La Más Cri Cri"	16 November 2021
For this week's main challenge, the queens will be paired with a past contestant and present a children's show on the runway inspired by one of the songs by Francisco Gabilondo Soler (also known as Cri-Cri: El Grillito Cantor). The pairings and songs were as follows: C-Pher and Madison; "El Ratón Vaquero" (The Cowboy Mouse); Elektra Vandergeld and Wynter; "Los Ratones Bomberos" (The Firefighting Mice); Iris XC and Margaret Y Ya; "El Ropero" (The Closet); La Morra Lisa and Alexis 3XL; "Canción de las Brujas" (Song of the Witches); Leexa Fox and Sirena; "El Chorrito" (The Splash); Lupita Kush and Mista Boo; "Cochinitos Dormilones" (Sleepy Piglets); Rebel Mörk and Gvajardo; "El Burrito" (The Little Donkey); On the runway, category is La Más Cri Cri (The Most Cri-Cri). C-Pher, Iris XC and La Morra Lisa receive positive critiques, with C-Pher winning the challenge. Elektra Vandergeld, Lupita Kush and Rebel Mörk receive negative critiques, with Rebel Mörk being safe. Elektra Vandergeld and Lupita Kush lip-sync to "El Patio De Mi Casa" by Tatiana, "No Me Quiero Bañar" by Tatiana and "La Patita Lulú" by Tatiana. Elektra Vandergeld wins the lip-sync and Lupita Kush sashays away.: Guest Judge: Tatiana; Main Challenge: Paired with a past contestants, present a children's show on the runway inspired by one of the songs by Francisco Gabilondo Soler (also known as Cri-Cri: El Grillito Cantor); Runway Theme: La Más Cri Cri (The Most Cri-Cri); Challenge Winner: C-Pher; Challenge Prize: A $5,000 cash tip; Bottom Two: Elektra Vandergeld (with Wynter) and Lupita Kush (with Mista Boo); Lip-Sync Songs: "El Patio De Mi Casa" by Tatiana, "No Me Quiero Bañar" by Tatiana and "La Patita Lulú" by Tatiana; Eliminated: Lupita Kush
37	10	"La Más Imperial"	23 November 2021
For this week's main challenge, the queens will perform a waltz number with a partner and a solo contemporary dance number. A reveal from their imperial look to a lingerie look must also be done in-between the dance numbers. On the runway, category is La Más Imperial (The Most Imperial). C-Pher and Iris XC receive positive critiques, with C-Pher winning the challenge. Elektra Vandergeld, La Morra Lisa, Leexa Fox and Rebel Mörk receive negative critiques, and are announced as the bottom four. It is then announced that the bottom four would be split into two separate lip-syncs, to determine which two queens would go home. The first lip-sync is between La Morra Lisa and Rebel Mörk. They lip-sync to "Sodio" by Danna Paola. Rebel Mörk wins the lip-sync and La Morra Lisa sashays away. The second lip-sync is between Elektra Vandergeld and Leexa Fox. They lip-sync to "En El Amor Hay Que Perdonar" by Belinda. Elektra Vandergeld wins the lip-sync and Leexa Fox sashays away.: Guest Judge: Itatí Cantoral; Main Challenge: Perform a waltz number with a partner and a solo contemporary dance number. A reveal from their imperial look to a lingerie look must also be done in-between the dance numbers; Runway Theme: La Más Imperial (The Most Craveable); Challenge Winner: C-Pher; Challenge Prize: A $5,000 cash tip; Bottom Four: Elektra Vandergeld, La Morra Lisa, Leexa Fox and Rebel Mörk; Lip-Sync Songs: "Sodio" by Danna Paola and "En El Amor Hay Que Perdonar" by Belinda; Eliminated: La Morra Lisa and Leexa Fox
38	11	"Día de Muertas"	30 November 2021
All the queens, after walking the runway on the category Día de Muertas (Day of the Dead), return to talk about what happened this season. Discussions include, Aurora Wonders on being the first eliminated and online attacks, La Carrera's experience on the show, Sirena's backstage rumors and Gustavo Helguera, Paper Cut's shocking elimination and his relationship with the cast, Tiresias' fan backlash, Georgiana's fan backlash, her discussions with her castmates, Ricky Lips and Letal, and her HIV status, Vera Cruz being the "villain" of the season and her runway mistake on the makeover, Lupita Kush's elimination, Leexa Fox's drag evolution, La Morra Lisa's drag experience, and the top 4 share their experience on the show.: Runway Theme: Día de Muertas (Day of the Dead)
39	12	"La Gran Final"	8 December 2021
For the final challenge of the season, the queens will produce, direct, and star in their own original performance on an original track recorded by themselves with DJ Neiko, and then present a look inspired by Mexican culture. The queens Mexican Culture inspirations were as follows: C-Pher - La Más Draga and Fan Reception; Elektra Vandergeld - Ensenada Carnival; Iris XC - Mexican Flora and Fauna; Rebel Mork - Alebrijes; The queens walk the runway one last time. It is revealed that Georgiana is this season's La Más Querida (Miss Congeniality). It is then revealed that Paper Cut is this season's La Más Volada (a prize sponsored by Viva Aerobus). It is then revealed that Rebel Mörk is the winner, leaving C-Pher, Elektra Vandergeld and Iris XC as the runners-up.: Guest Judges: Daniela Rodrice; Main Challenge: Produce, direct, and star in their own original performance on an original track recorded by themselves with DJ Neiko and present a look inspired by Mexican Culture; Runway Theme: Lo Que + Amo De Mexico (What I Most Love About Mexico); La Más Querida: Georgiana; La Más Volada: Paper Cut; Runners-up: C-Pher, Elektra Vandergeld and Iris XC; Winner of La Más Draga Season Four: Rebel Mörk
