= Baja jacket =

Type of hooded pullover jacket

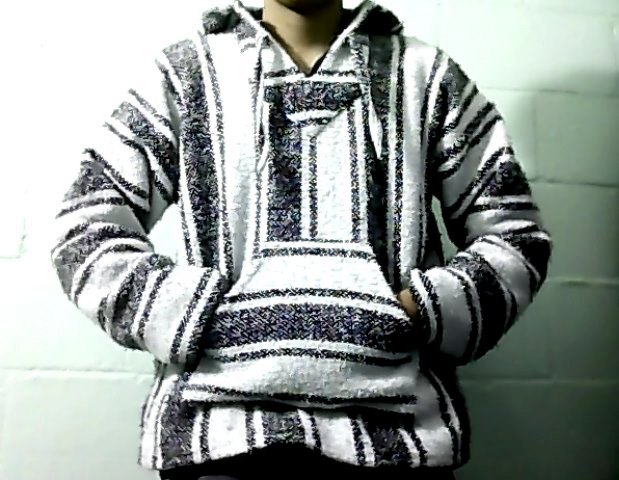
A Baja jacket

A Baja jacket (also known as a Mexican Baja hoodie, Baja sweatshirt, or drug rug) is a type of Mexican jacket with a single large pocket on the front, and vents on the side. They are more commonly made out of a coarse woolen fabric known as "jerga". They are often decorated with patterns consisting of horizontal stripes on the sleeves and hood, and vertical stripes down the rest of the jacket. The drawstrings are often flatter and more rectangular than most jacket drawstrings, and always made of the same material as the rest of the jacket.

The shirts, called "sudadera de jerga" ("cloth sweatshirt") in Mexico, are also traditionally worn by Mexican-American and Mexican youth, especially young men, and can be considered a part of cholo style.

Baja jackets are made with a variety of different materials, often cotton, acrylic and polyester. The fabric can be made from recycled fibers, such as recycled T-shirts. The jackets tend to be somewhat waterproof and fast-drying, making them more suitable for the elements. Some jackets have a soft lining for extra comfort and warmth.
