= Mexican rag doll =

Type of Ragdoll

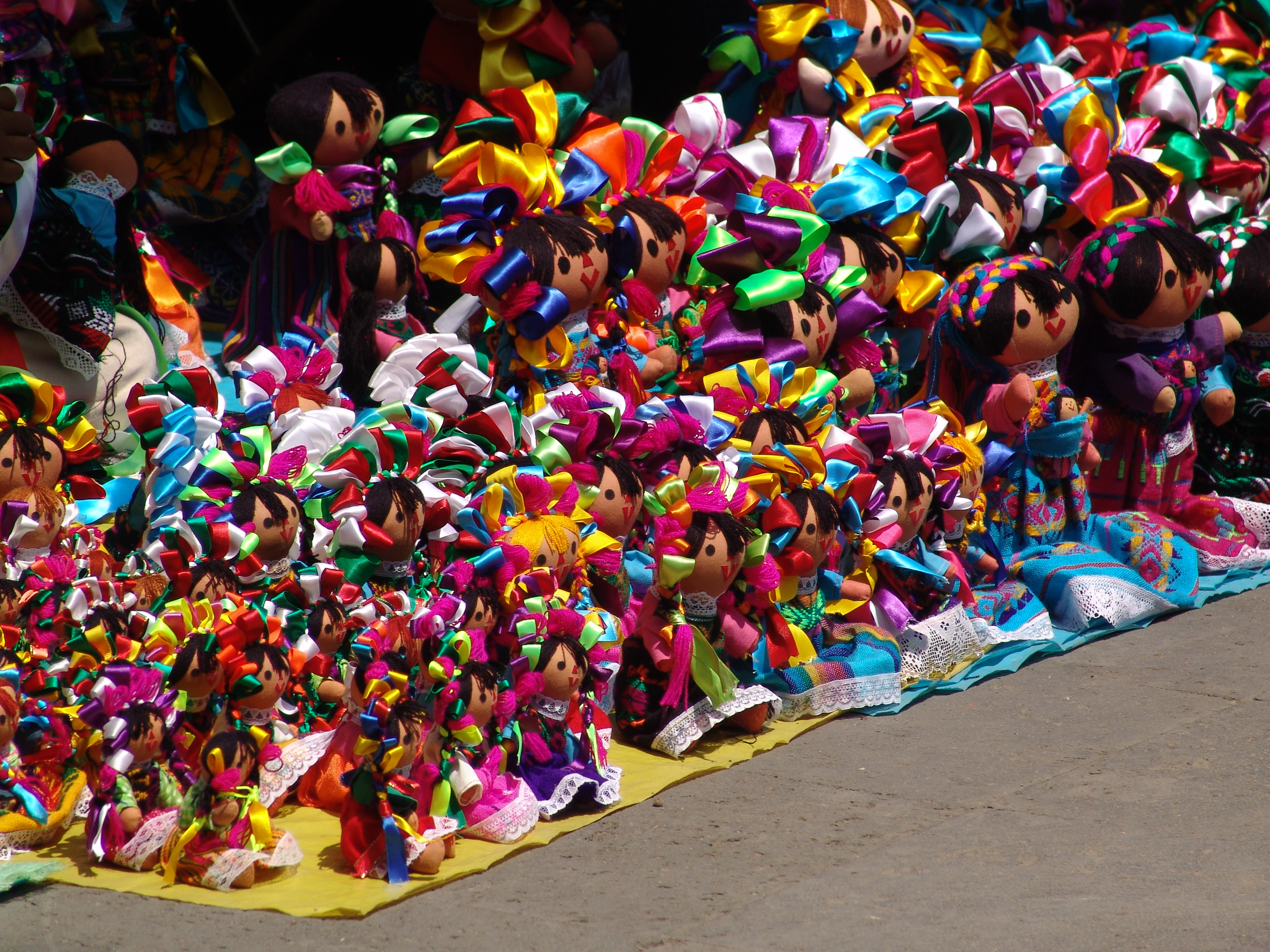
Rows of "Marias" for sale in San Angel, Mexico City

The best known Mexican rag dolls are those whose origins can be traced back to México City with the creation of a workshop "Centro de Capacitación Mazahua", with the intentions to enhance income opportunities for the Mazahua-Otomí people after their migration to the larger cities, in search for a better future. In Queretaro, they have been called "Marias" and they have registered a patent for the doll as an attempt to increase tourism. This action has been criticized by some people because it could be perceived as an attempt to culturally appropriate a craft that belongs to the Mazahua-Otomí people. Throughout the country people call them "rag dolls" (muñecas de trapo). Mexico has a long history of making rag dolls, but the ones known popularly from their appearance nationally, especially in tourist venues may date back only to the 1970s, during the time the workshop was running. Although Amealco is strongly connected to these dolls, their making is not limited and has spread into various states, with some variations in dress and appearance, but always keeping with wide faces and hair generously braided with ribbons.

== Significance ==
Various types of rag dolls have been made, but the most common have smiling faces, indigenous-like dress, and hair braided with ribbons. They have been called "Marias," but are more often simply called "rag dolls" (muñecas de trapo). Ranging in size from three to forty five centimeters and sometimes more, the dolls can be found for sale just about anywhere in Mexico, especially in tourist venues. Because of this, they have become a symbol of Mexico for foreigners and have been shipped outside of the country, primarily to the United States, Canada and South America.

== History ==
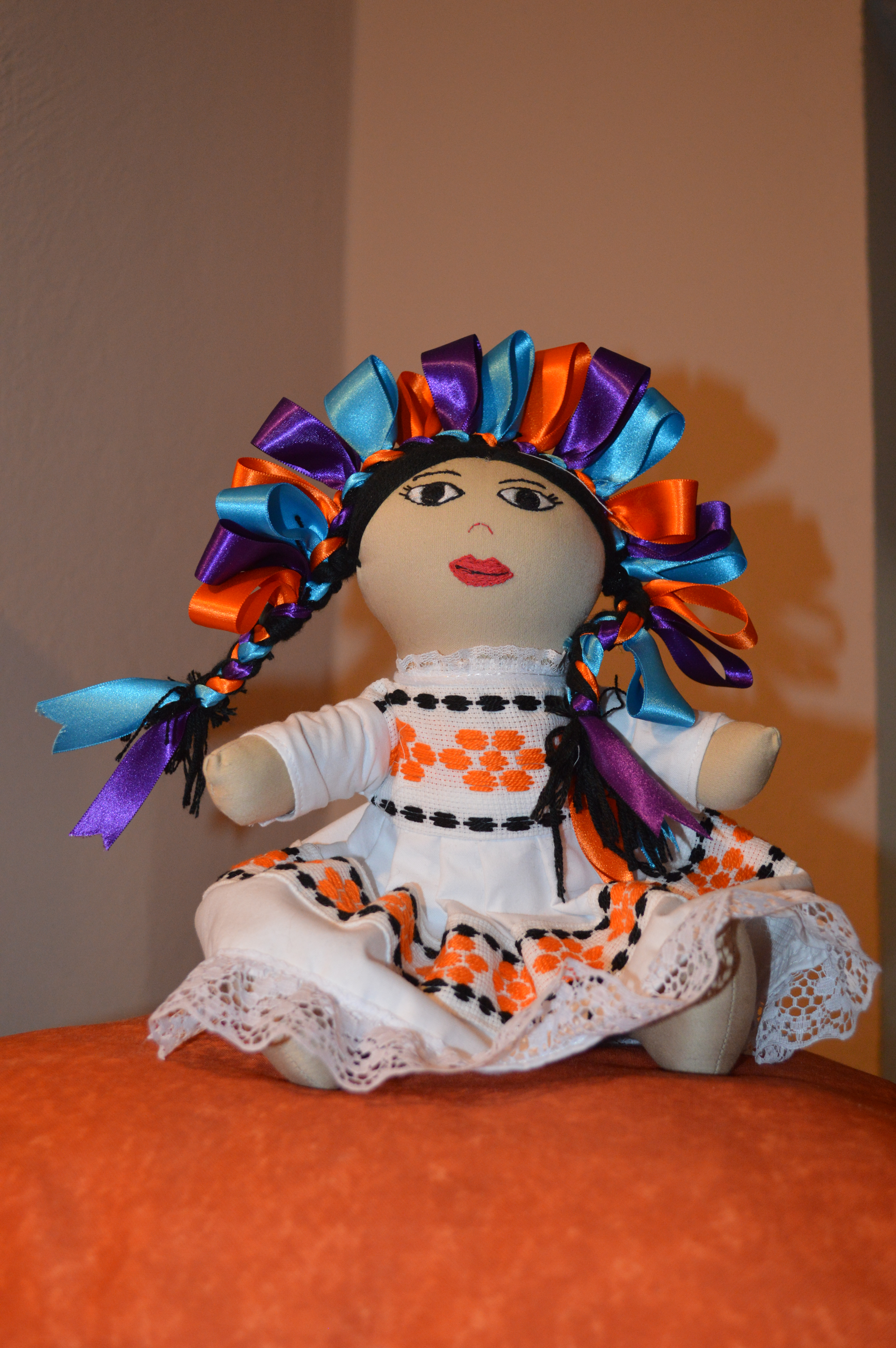
A completely handstiched version of the doll

Rag dolls of various types have a long history in Mexico, especially since the colonial period. The making of dolls from old bits of clothing is still common among Mexico's indigenous populations, often using clothing that had been worn out by some member of the family, and made by mother or grandmother. However, the "Maria" dolls most likely originated in southern Queretaro, especially the municipality of Amealco, a heavily Otomi (Ñhañhü) area. According to Queretaro state authorities, the Marias originate from the communities of Santiago Mexquititlan and San Ildefonso Tultepec in the municipality of Amealco de Bonfil. They may date back to only the 1970s, when Guadalupe Rivera, daughter of muralist Diego Rivera, started a program designed to help the local economy, in particular that to the local women, who had been limited to selling candy on the street in cities. She taught the local people her style of making rag dolls, which originally include the use of buttons so that the dolls would have movable arms and legs, but since then, the design has been modified to the current version. However, the Mazahua people of neighbouring Michoacan state have also laid claim to the dolls. The dress of the dolls is similar to that of both the Mazahua and the Otomi of this area. The popularity of the dolls surged around the same time of the popularity of a movie personality called La India Maria, whose dress was similar to that of the Mazahua and took away some of the stigma of an indigenous look.

== The dolls and Amealco ==
The dolls are strongly tied to Amealco, where seventy percent of the indigenous population or about 3,000 people are dedicated to the making of these and another type of rag doll, which accounts for at least part of their income. Many are self-taught or taught through friends or family. Amealco has the first museum in Mexico dedicated solely to traditional handcrafted dolls, located in the town center in a building from the 19th century. The town is also home to the annual Handcrafted Doll Festival (Festival de la Muñeca Artesanal) held in November. The town now holds an annual national contest for handcrafted dolls.

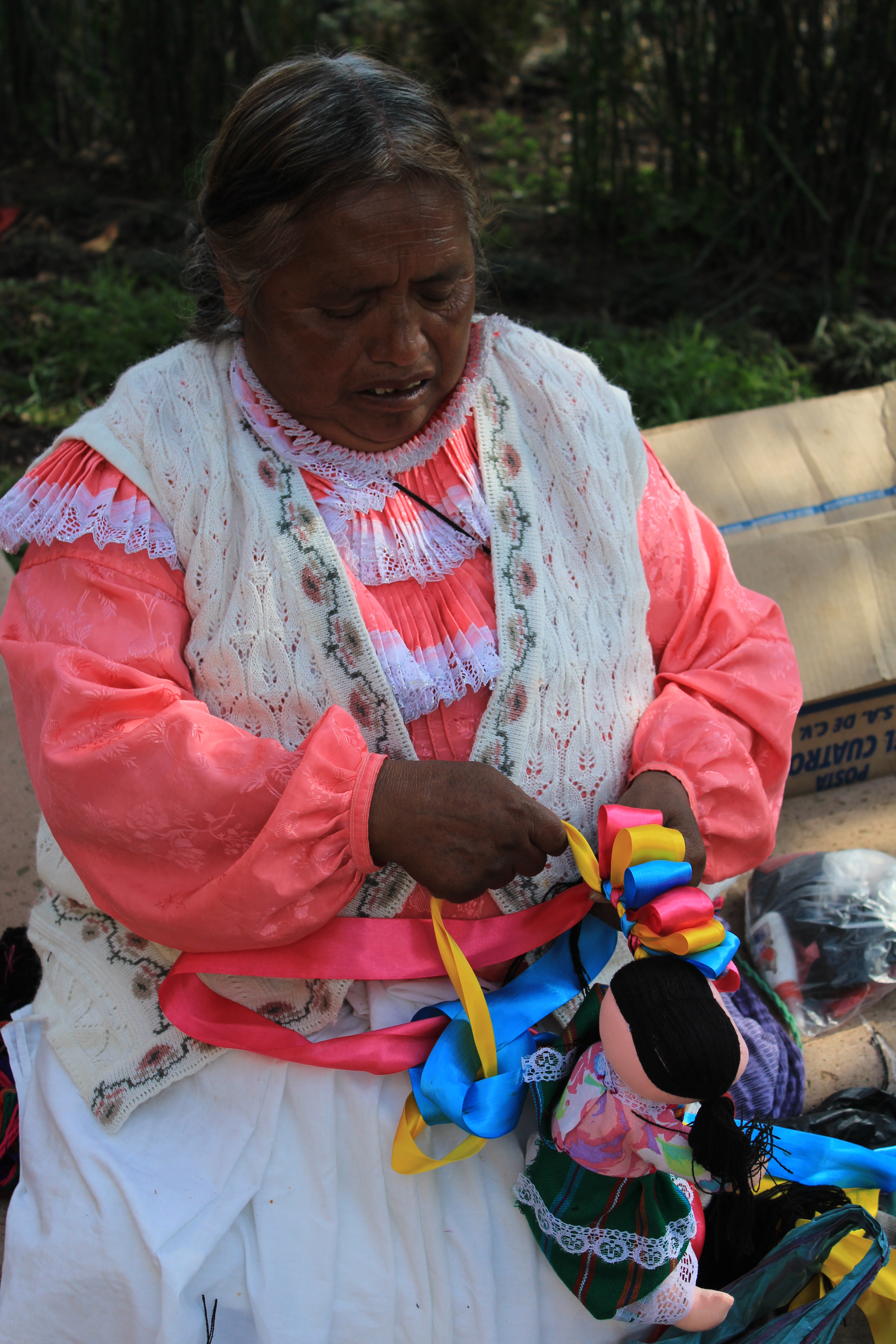
Otomi woman crafting a traditional doll, Amealco de Bonfil, Queretaro.

However, the making of the dolls is not limited to Amealco. Because of their popularity, their manufacture either by handcrafting or more industrial methods expanded to other parts of Queretaro, into Guanajuato (especially among Otomi populations there) and then into other states. This expansion has led to variations in the doll's dress and sometimes appearance, such as skin tone.

== Authenticity ==
The most authentic of the dolls are made by hand and/or sewing machine in homes or small workshops, mostly by women but sometimes men and children participate. Most of the materials are commercially-made, such as fabric and buttons, but the most traditional filling is a local fiber called guata. Although the ribbon-adorned version with the wide face is by far the most popular, other variations have come about such as dolls representing Frida Kahlo and those made with more ecological materials. In 2014, the state of Queretaro filed paperwork to seek "denomination of origin" for the dolls to have only those made in southern Queretaro as authentic, but this was denied, principally because the dolls are primarily made with non-local materials.
