= La Estampida =

Sculpture in Guadalajara, Jalisco, Mexico

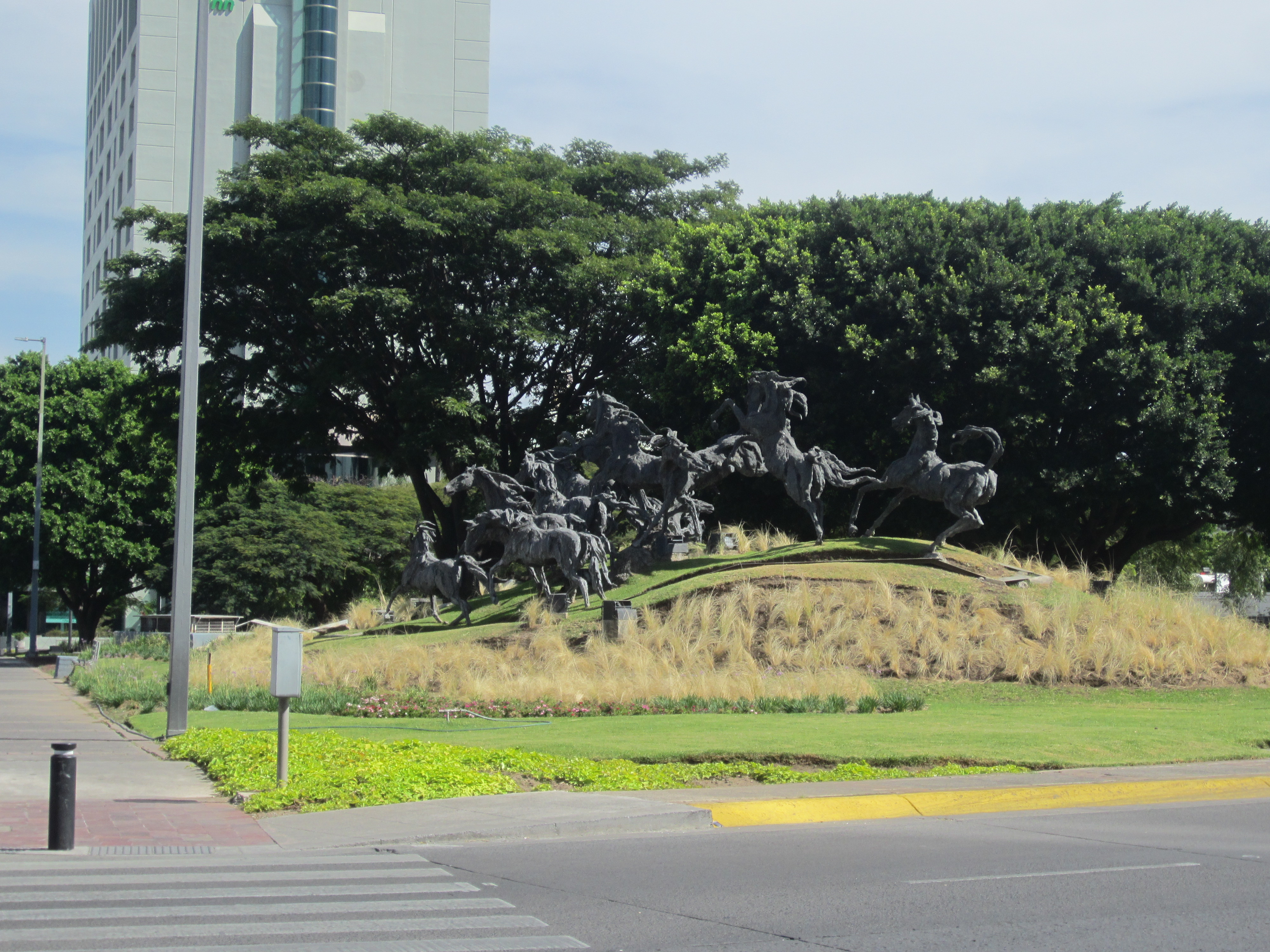
- The sculpture in 2021
- Location: Guadalajara, Jalisco, Mexico
- Coordinates: 20.6664°N 103.3930°W

La Estampida, known colloquially as Glorieta de los Caballos (Horses Roundabout), is an outdoor sculpture installed in Guadalajara, in the Mexican state of Jalisco.
