= List of Drag Race contestants =

List of contestants on reality competition television franchise created by RuPaul

RuPaul's Drag Race, an American reality competition television program, premiered in 2009 and documents host RuPaul's search for "America's Next Drag Superstar". Its success has led to the creation of a franchise including RuPaul's Drag Race All Stars; international spin-off series including British and Australian and New Zealand versions hosted by RuPaul; Chilean, Thai, Canadian, Dutch, Spanish, Italian, French, Philippine, Belgian, Swedish, Mexican, Brazilian, German and South African localizations; international "vs. the World" competitions hosted in the UK, Canada, the Philippines and Australia and New Zealand; and All Stars adaptations in Spain and France. 238 contestants have appeared on the original American series over seventeen seasons; 111 past contestants have returned to compete on All Stars; and another 520 contestants have appeared across the international editions of the show. 85 of these contestants have returned to compete on an international All Stars or vs. the World season.

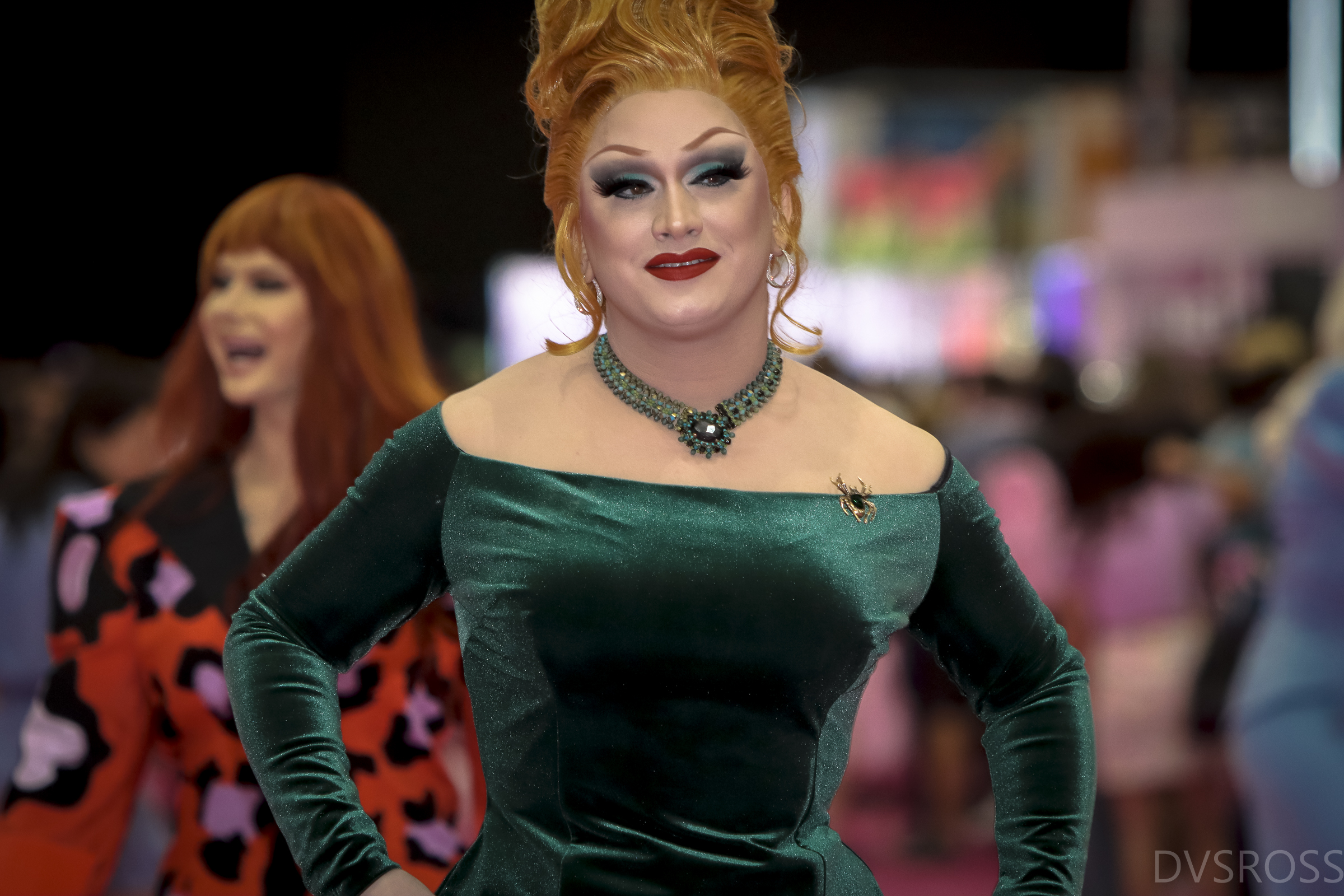
Jinkx Monsoon is the only contestant to win Drag Race twice, the most of any contestant.

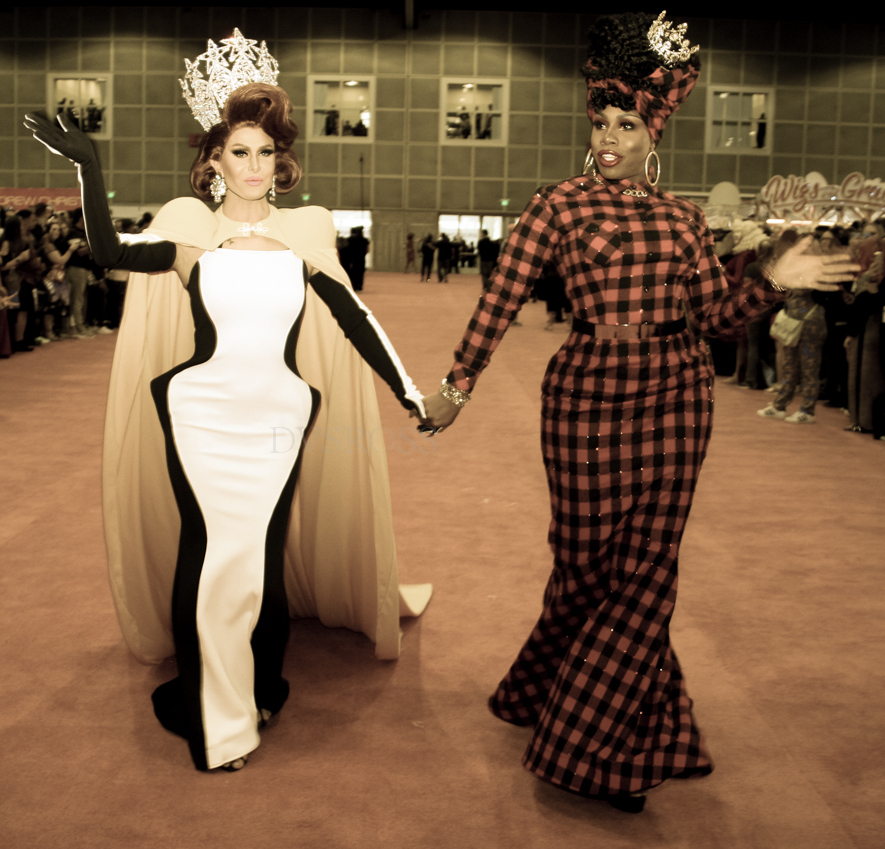
Monét X Change & Trinity the Tuck were the first to both win a Drag Race Season.

Suki Doll is the only contestant to win Miss Congeniality twice.

Xunami Muse and Sapphira Cristál were the first to both win Miss Congeniality.

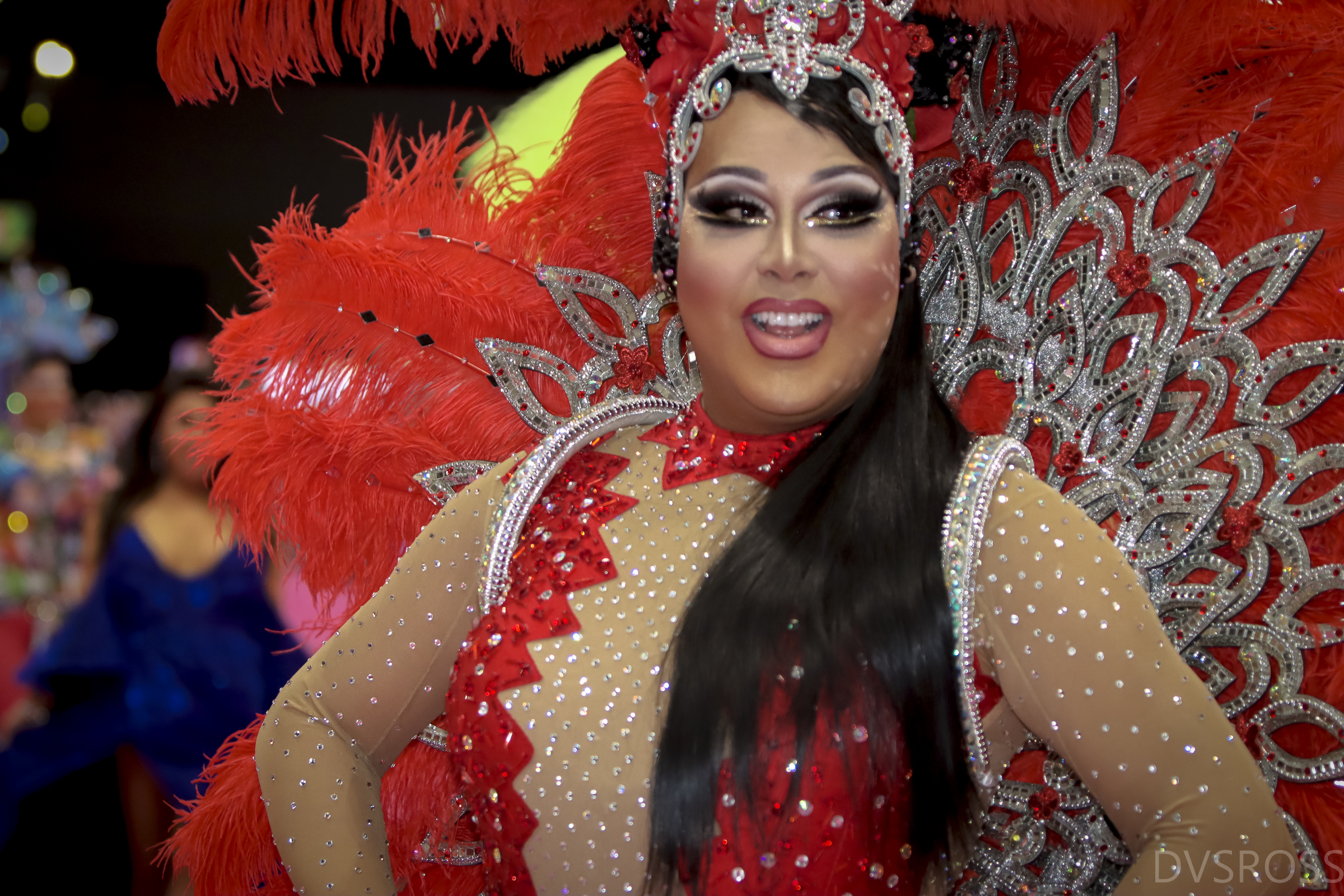
Alexis Mateo has completed on 5 seasons, the most of any contestant.

The original series has crowned eighteen winners. In addition, in eleven seasons of All Stars, eleven queens have won entry into the "Drag Race Hall of Fame": Chad Michaels, Alaska, Trixie Mattel, Monét X Change, Trinity the Tuck, Shea Couleé, Kylie Sonique Love, Jimbo, Angeria Paris VanMicheals, Ginger Minj, Crystal Methyd — and one, Jinkx Monsoon, has been crowned the "Queen of All Queens", becoming the first contestant to win two different seasons in the franchise.

As of 2026, Alexis Mateo has appeared more than any other contestant on Drag Race, competing on five different seasons. Jujubee, Eureka!, Ginger Minj, Kennedy Davenport, and Silky Nutmeg Ganache have all competed on four different seasons each. Several other queens have competed on three seasons, including Shangela (the first to do so), Gia Gunn, Latrice Royale, Manila Luzon, Pandora Boxx, Yara Sofia, Mo Heart, Monét X Change, Shea Couleé, Trinity the Tuck, Ra'Jah O'Hara, Jimbo, Mayhem Miller, Scarlet Envy, Pakita, Roxxxy Andrews, Shannel, Vanessa Vanjie Mateo, Cheryl, Lemon, Alyssa Edwards, Aja, Cynthia Lee Fontaine, Jorgeous, Soa de Muse, Mariah Paris Balenciaga, A'keria C. Davenport, Morgan McMichaels, Pythia, LaLa Ri, and Nicole Paige Brooks.

== Background ==
Most competitors have been cisgender gay men, although several contestants came out as trans women on the show, while others entered the competition already out and at various stages in their transitions. Monica Beverly Hillz, who came out as a trans woman during season 5, said in a 2013 interview that the show does not require contestants to identify as male and that transgender women can participate if they consider themselves drag artists. However, in 2018, RuPaul told The Guardian that he would "probably not" allow a transgender contestant who had "really transitioned" to compete and later compared transgender drag performers to doping athletes. RuPaul has since apologized for those comments.

Kylie Sonique Love, who made history as the first contestant to come out as trans on the show, during the season 2 reunion episode, became the first out trans woman to win a U.S. version of the show when she was inducted into the "Hall of Fame" in All Stars 6. However, Angele Anang was the first openly trans woman to win a season in the entire franchise, after she emerged victorious on Thailand season 2. The two have been followed by Vanessa Van Cartier (Holland season 2), Sasha Colby (season 15), and Captivating Katkat (Philippines season 2). On season 13, Gottmik became the first openly trans man to compete on the show. She has been followed by Denim (Canada season 4). On UK series 3, Victoria Scone became the first cis woman to compete on the show. She has been followed by Clover Bish (España season 3), Pandora Nox (Germany season 1), Velma Jones (Canada season 6), and Malawitte (France season 4). In 2023, Pandora became the first cis woman to win a season of Drag Race. On season 14, Maddy Morphosis became the first cisgender heterosexual man to compete.

As of 2026, eight previous contestants across the franchise have died. Season 2 contestant Sahara Davenport died of heart failure in 2012, at age 27. She was in a long-term relationship with season 3 contestant Manila Luzon at the time. Season 8 and All Stars 3 contestant Chi Chi DeVayne died of complications from scleroderma and pneumonia in 2020, at age 34. UK series 2 contestant Cherry Valentine died by suicide in 2022, at age 28. Thailand season 2 contestant Bandit died in 2023, at age 38. UK series 1 winner and All Stars 7 contestant The Vivienne died of complications from a ketamine overdose in 2025, at age 32. Season 4 and All Stars 6 contestant Jiggly Caliente died from sepsis in 2025, at age 44. She also co-hosted Drag Race Philippines. Down Under season 1 contestant Maxi Shield died from throat cancer in 2026, at age 51. Philippines season 4 contestant Misua died in their sleep in 2026, at age 27, prior to the season being aired.

== U.S. seasons ==
=== RuPaul's Drag Race and RuPaul's Drag Race All Stars ===
The original series RuPaul's Drag Race has crowned eighteen winners: BeBe Zahara Benet, Tyra Sanchez, Raja, Sharon Needles, Jinkx Monsoon, Bianca Del Rio, Violet Chachki, Bob the Drag Queen, Sasha Velour, Aquaria, Yvie Oddly, Jaida Essence Hall, Symone, Willow Pill, Sasha Colby, Nymphia Wind, Onya Nurve and Myki Meeks.

RuPaul's Drag Race All Stars, a spin-off series in which past contestants return to compete for a spot in the Drag Race "Hall of Fame", premiered in 2012. There have been eleven seasons and twelve winners, the result of a tie in the fourth season. The winners, in chronological order, are: Chad Michaels, Alaska, Trixie Mattel, Monét X Change and Trinity the Tuck, Shea Couleé, Kylie Sonique Love, Jinkx Monsoon, Jimbo, Angeria Paris VanMicheals, Ginger Minj and Crystal Methyd.

=== RuPaul's Secret Celebrity Drag Race ===
Ages, names, and cities stated are at time of filming.

Legend

The contestant won the season, episode, or special.
The contestant was voted Miss Congeniality of the season.
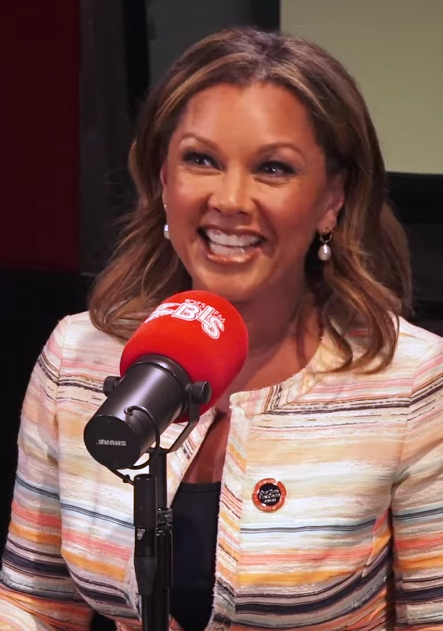
Season 1 episode 2 winner
Vanessa Williams

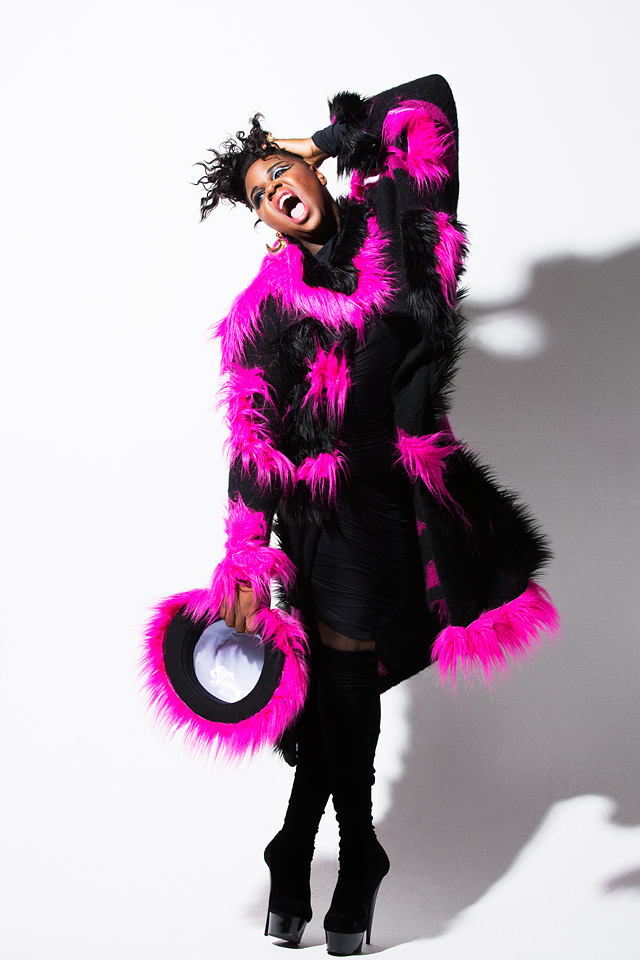
Season 1 episode 3 winner
Alex Newell

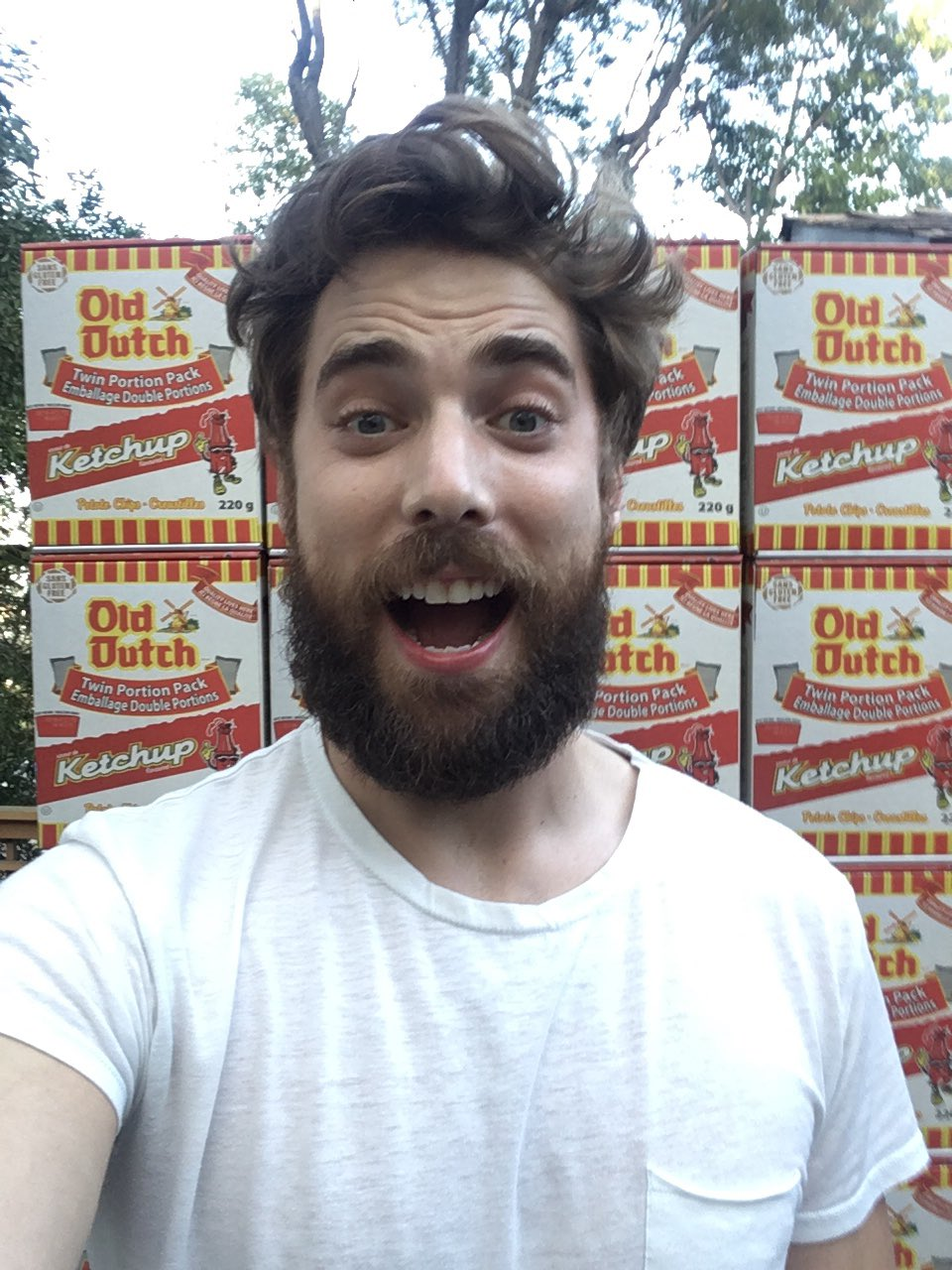
Season 1 episode 3 winner
Dustin Milligan

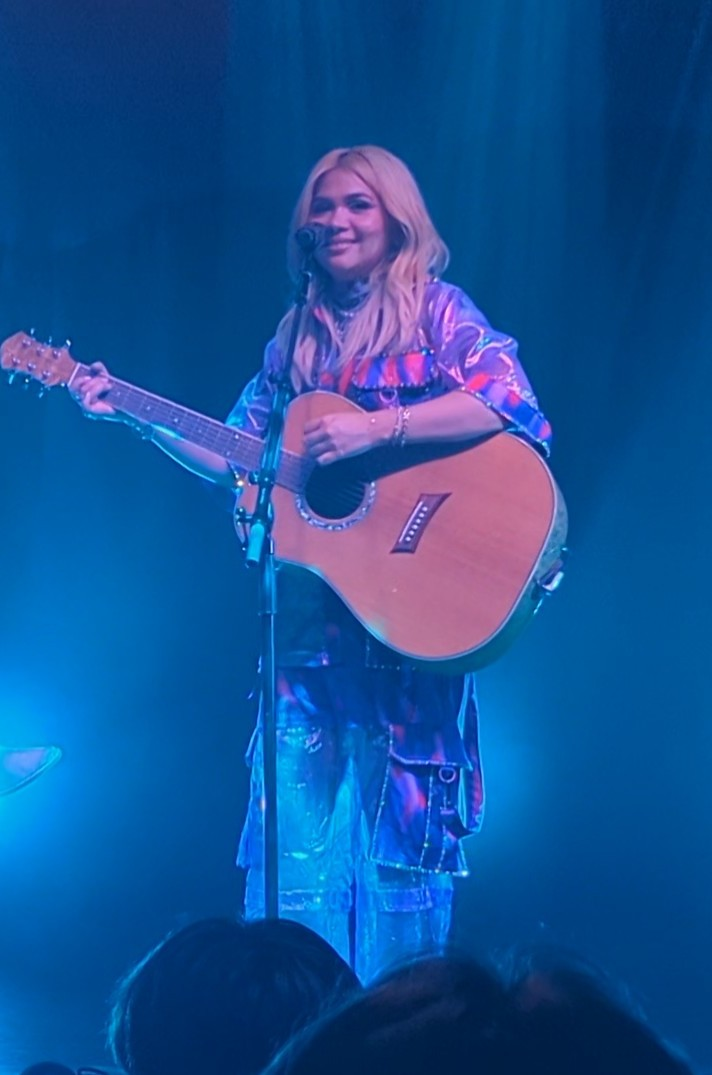
Season 1 episode 4 winner
Hayley Kiyoko

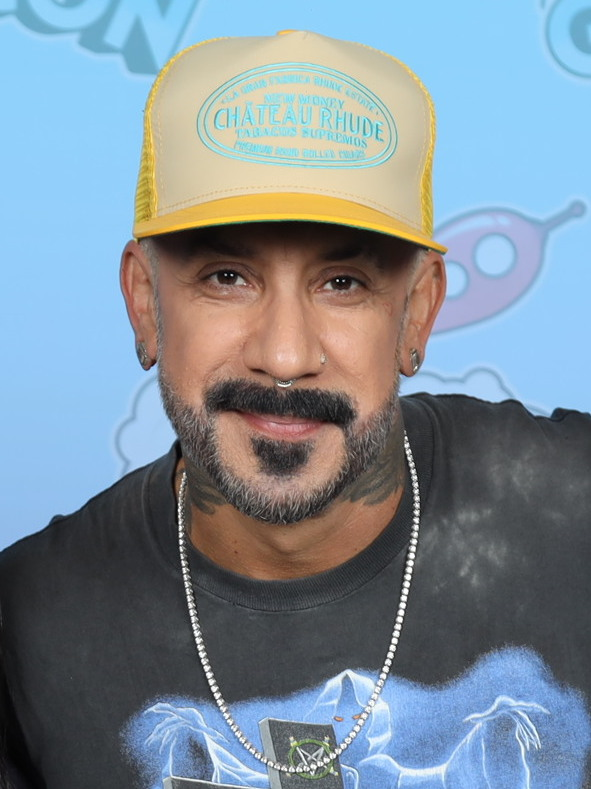
Season 2 winner
AJ McLean

RuPaul's Secret Celebrity Drag Race is a spin-off show which premiered April 24, 2020 on VH1. It featured a total of 12 celebrities over four episodes and were mentored by returning RuPaul's Drag Race contestants with their drag transformation. The winner of each episode gets to donate the prize to a charity of their choice which raised $210,000 across 11 various charities. The second season consisted of nine celebrities competing weekly in "Lip Sync Extravanganza" for the chance to win $100,000 for their charity of choice.

Contestants of RuPaul's Secret Celebrity Drag Race and their backgrounds
Season	Episode	Contestant	Celebrity	Outcome	Queen Supreme
1	1				
1	1	Babykins La Roux	Jordan Connor	Winner	Trixie Mattel
1	1	Miss Mimi Teapot	Jermaine Fowler	Runners-up	Bob the Drag Queen
1	1	Olivette Isyou	Nico Tortorella	Runners-up	Monét X Change
1	2				
1	2	Vanqueisha De House	Vanessa Williams	Winner	Asia O'Hara
1	2	Mary J. Ross	Loni Love	Runners-up	Trinity the Tuck (Note: Now Trinity the Tuck, she is referred to as Trinity Taylor on season 9.)
1	2	Miss Shenita Cocktail	Tami Roman	Runners-up	Alyssa Edwards
1	3				
1	3	Bette Bordeaux	Matt Iseman	Winners	Kim Chi
1	3	Madam That Bitch	Alex Newell	Winners	Bob the Drag Queen
1	3	Rachel McAdamsapple	Dustin Milligan	Winners	Nina West
1	4				
1	4	Queen Eleza Beth	Hayley Kiyoko	Winner	Vanessa Vanjie Mateo
1	4	Cocotini	Phoebe Robinson	Runners-up	Alyssa Edwards
1	4	Coral Fixation	Madison Beer	Runners-up	Monique Heart (Note: Now Mo Heart, she is referred to as Monique Heart on season 10 and All Stars 4.)
2	—N/a				
2	—N/a	Poppy Love	AJ McLean	Winner	Jujubee
2	—N/a	Chakra 7	Tatyana Ali	Runner-up (Note: The contestant was voted Miss Congeniality or similar.)	Brooke Lynn Hytes
2	—N/a	Thirsty von Trap	Mark Indelicato	Runner-up	Monét X Change
2	—N/a	Chic-Li-Fay	Kevin McHale	4th	Brooke Lynn Hytes
2	—N/a	Donna Bellissima	Daniel Franzese	5th	Monét X Change
2	—N/a	Milli von Sunshine	Jenna Ushkowitz	6th	Jujubee
2	—N/a	Jackie Would	Thom Filicia	7th	Jujubee
2	—N/a	Electra Owl	Taylor Dayne	8th	Brooke Lynn Hytes
2	—N/a	Fabulosity	Loretta Devine	9th	Monét X Change

=== RuPaul's Drag Race Holi-slay Spectacular ===
RuPaul's Drag Race Holi-slay Spectacular is a holiday television special, which aired on VH1 on December 7, 2018.

Contestants of RuPaul's Drag Race Holi-slay Spectacular and their backgrounds
Contestant	Original season(s)	Original placement(s)	Outcome
Eureka (Note: Eureka O'Hara is referred to as Eureka on seasons 9 and 10 and Eureka! on All Stars 6 and Canada vs. the World season 2.)	Season 9	11th (Note: The contestant was removed from the competition due to medical reasons.)	Winners
Eureka	Season 10	Runner-up	Winners
Jasmine Masters	Season 7	12th	Winners
Kim Chi	Season 8	Runner-up	Winners
Latrice Royale	Season 4	4th (Note: The contestant was voted Miss Congeniality on her original season.)	Winners
Latrice Royale	All Stars 1	7th	Winners
Mayhem Miller	Season 10	10th	Winners
Shangela (Note: Shangela Laquifa Wadley is referred to as her full name on Season 2 and as Shangela on Season 3 and All Stars 3.)	Season 2	12th	Winners
Shangela	Season 3	6th	Winners
Shangela	All Stars 3	3rd	Winners
Sonique (Note: Now Kylie Sonique Love, she is referred to as Sonique on season 2.)	Season 2	9th	Winners
Trixie Mattel	Season 7	6th	Winners
Trixie Mattel	All Stars 3	Winner	Winners

=== RuPaul's Drag U ===
From 2010 to 2012, Logo aired a spin-off to Drag Race entitled RuPaul's Drag U. The series saw members of the public receive drag-inspired makeovers from selected memorable contestants from Drag Race.

Contestants of RuPaul's Drag Race U and their appearances on the show
Professors	Original season	Season		
Professors	Original season	1	2	3
BeBe Zahara Benet	Season 1		Main	
Nina Flowers	Season 1	Main		
Ongina	Season 1	Main		
Shannel	Season 1	Main		
Tammie Brown	Season 1	Main		
Jujubee	Season 2	Main		
Raven	Season 2	Main		
Morgan McMichaels	Season 2	Main		
Pandora Boxx	Season 2		Main	
Tyra Sanchez	Season 2		Main	
Alexis Mateo	Season 3			Main
Carmen Carrera	Season 3		Main	
Delta Work	Season 3			Main
Manila Luzon	Season 3		Main	
Mariah (Note: Mariah Paris Balenciaga is referred to as Mariah on season 3.)	Season 3		Main	
Raja	Season 3			Main
Chad Michaels	Season 4			Main
Latrice Royale	Season 4			Main
Sharon Needles	Season 4			Main
Willam	Season 4			Main

=== RuPaul's Drag Race Global All Stars ===
RuPaul's Drag Race Global All Stars premiered on August 16, 2024. It features previous competitors from the American, Belgian, Brazilian, British, Canadian, Down Under, French, German, Italian, Mexican, Philippine, and Swedish editions of the franchise. It has crowned one winner: Alyssa Edwards.

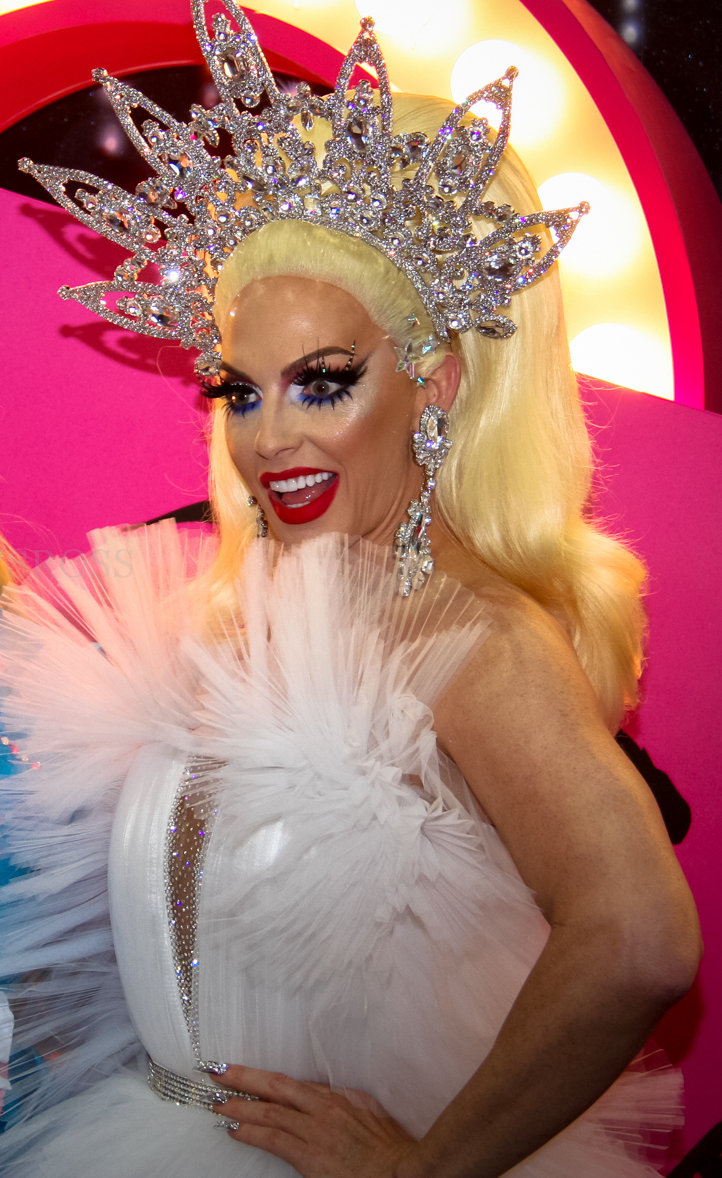
Season 1 winner
Alyssa Edwards

Contestants of RuPaul's Drag Race Global All Stars and their backgrounds
Season	Contestant	Age	Hometown	Original season(s)	Original placement(s)	Outcome
1	Alyssa Edwards	43	Dallas, United States	US 5	6th	Winner
1	Alyssa Edwards	43	Dallas, United States	US All Stars 2	5th	Winner
1	Kitty Scott-Claus	31	Birmingham, United Kingdom	UK 3	Runner-up	Runners-up
1	Kween Kong	31	Adelaide, Australia	Down Under 2	Runner-up	Runners-up
1	Nehellenia	33	Rome, Italy	Italia 2	Runner-up	Runners-up
1	Tessa Testicle	25	Basel, Switzerland	Germany 1	8th	5th
1	Vanity Vain	31	Linköping, Sweden	Sverige 1	3rd	6th
1	Pythia	28	Montreal, Canada	Canada 2	Runner-up	7th
1	Gala Varo	34	Morelia, Mexico	México 1	Runner-up	8th
1	Soa de Muse	31	Saint-Denis, France	France 1	Runner-up	9th
1	Eva Le Queen	35	Marikina, Philippines	Philippines 1	3rd	10th
1	Miranda Lebrão	34	Rio de Janeiro, Brazil	Brasil 1	Runner-up	11th
1	Athena Likis (Note: Athena Likis is referred to as Athena Sorgelikis on Drag Race Belgique season 1)	27	City of Brussels, Belgium	Belgique 1	Runner-up	12th

== International seasons ==
Ages, names, and cities stated are at time of filming.

Legend:

The contestant won the season.
The contestant was voted the local equivalent of Miss Congeniality either on or off screen.
The contestant was removed from the competition due to medical reasons.
The contestant came back to compete after being either removed or eliminated in a previous season.
The contestant quit the competition.
The contestant was disqualified.

† indicates that the contestant is deceased.

=== Canada's Drag Race ===
Canada's Drag Race premiered in 2020. It has crowned six winners: Priyanka, Icesis Couture, Gisèle Lullaby, Venus, The Virgo Queen, and Van Goth.

==== Canada's Drag Race: Canada vs. the World ====
Canada's Drag Race: Canada vs. the World premiered in November 2022. It is the second season, following UK vs. the World, to feature returning contestants from across the international installments of the franchise. The first season is the fourth, following The Switch 2, All Stars 3 and All Stars 7, to feature a previous Drag Race winner competing again.

Along with contestants from the Canadian edition, it also features competitors from the American, British, Down Under, and French franchises. It has crowned two winners: Ra'Jah O'Hara and Lemon.

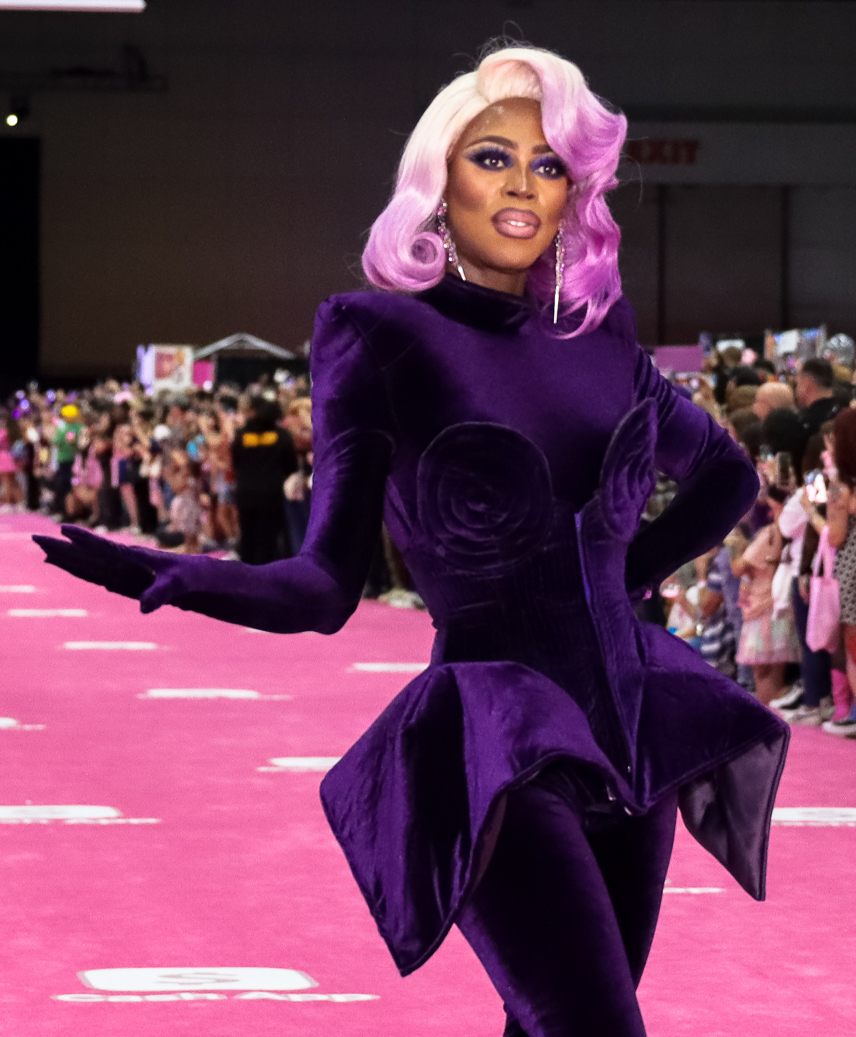
Season 1 winner
Ra'Jah O'Hara

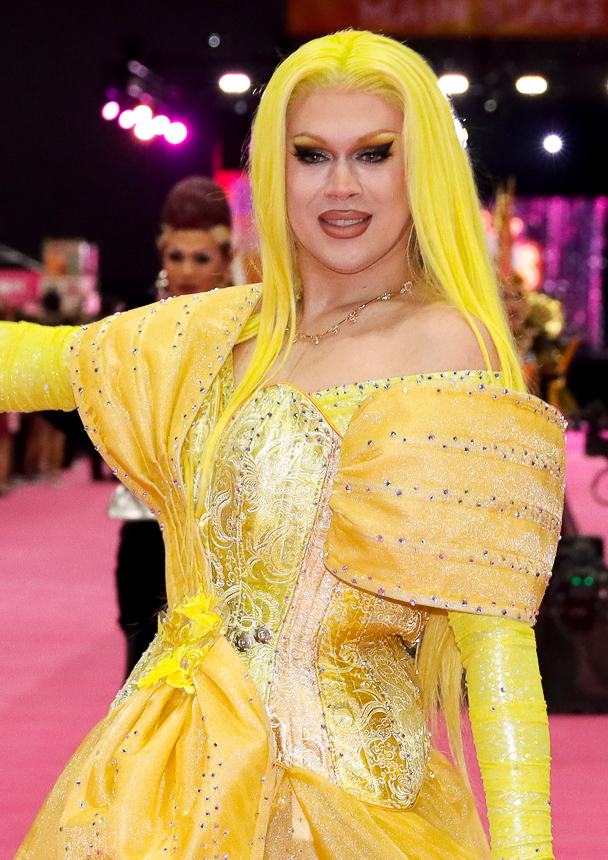
Season 2 winner
Lemon

Contestants of Canada's Drag Race: Canada vs. the World and their backgrounds
Season	Contestant	Age	Hometown	Original season(s)	Original placement(s)	Outcome
1	Ra'Jah O'Hara	37	Dallas, United States	US 11	9th	Winner
1	Ra'Jah O'Hara	37	Dallas, United States	US All Stars 6	Runner-up	Winner
1	Silky Nutmeg Ganache	31	Chicago, United States	US 11	3rd	Runner-up
1	Silky Nutmeg Ganache	31	Chicago, United States	US All Stars 6	11th	Runner-up
1	Rita Baga	34	Montreal, Canada	Canada 1	Runner-up	3rd
1	Victoria Scone	29	Cardiff, United Kingdom	UK 3	10th	3rd
1	Vanity Milan	30	South London, United Kingdom	UK 3	4th	5th
1	Icesis Couture	35	Ottawa, Canada	Canada 2	Winner	6th (Note: The contestant quit the competition.)
1	Anita Wigl'it	32	Leigh, New Zealand	Down Under 1	8th	7th
1	Stephanie Prince	24	Calgary, Canada	Canada 2	10th	8th
1	Kendall Gender	31	Vancouver, Canada	Canada 2	Runner-up	9th
2	Lemon	28	Toronto, Canada	Canada 1	5th	Winner
2	Lemon	28	Toronto, Canada	UK vs. the World 1	9th	Winner
2	Alexis Mateo	44	Las Vegas, United States	US 3	3rd	Runner-up
2	Alexis Mateo	44	Las Vegas, United States	US All Stars 1	5th	Runner-up
2	Alexis Mateo	44	Las Vegas, United States	US All Stars 5	5th	Runner-up
2	Cheryl (Note: Cheryl is referred to as Cheryl Hole on UK 1 and UK vs. the World 1.)	30	Chelmsford, United Kingdom	UK 1	4th	3rd
2	Cheryl	30	Chelmsford, United Kingdom	UK vs. the World 1	8th	3rd
2	Kennedy Davenport	43	Dallas, United States	US 7	4th	3rd
2	Kennedy Davenport	43	Dallas, United States	US All Stars 3	Runner-up	3rd
2	Miss Fiercalicious	27	Toronto, Canada	Canada 3	3rd	5th
2	Eureka!	33	Los Angeles, United States	US 9	11th	6th
2	Eureka!	33	Los Angeles, United States	US 10	Runner-up	6th
2	Eureka!	33	Los Angeles, United States	US All Stars 6	Runner-up	6th
2	Tynomi Banks	42	Toronto, Canada	Canada 1	9th	7th
2	Le Fil	38	Brighouse, United Kingdom	UK 4	7th	8th
2	La Kahena	31	Paris, France	France 1	10th	9th

==== Canada's Drag Race All Stars ====
Canada's Drag Race All Stars premiered in July 2026.

Contestants of Canada's Drag Race All Stars and their backgrounds
Season	Contestant	Age	Hometown	Original season(s)	Original placement(s)	Outcome
1	Aurora Matrix	25	Toronto, Ontario	Season 4	Runner-up	Winner
1	Nearah Nuff	25	Calgary, Alberta	Season 4	3rd	Runner-up
1	Jada Shada Hudson	41	Toronto, Ontario	Season 3	Runner-up	3rd
1	Sami Landri	27	Moncton, New Brunswick	Season 6	3rd (Note: Sami Landri was voted the Shark Fan Favourite of her original season.)	3rd
1	Tiffany Ann Co.	34	Vancouver, British Columbia	Season 5	10th	5th
1	Makayla Couture	23	Toronto, Ontario	Season 5	Runner-up	6th
1	Juice Boxx	37	Port Hope, Ontario	Season 1	12th	7th
1	Pythia	31	Montreal, Quebec	Season 2	Runner-up	8th (Note: Pythia was voted the Shark Fan Favourite of the season.)
1	Pythia	31	Montreal, Quebec	Global All Stars 1	7th	8th
1	Jackie Cox	40	New York City, United States	US Season 12	5th	9th

=== Drag Race Belgique ===
Drag Race Belgique premiered in 2023. It has crowned two winners: Drag Couenne and Alvilda.

Contestants of Drag Race Belgique and their backgrounds
Season	Contestant	Age	Hometown	Outcome
1	Drag Couenne	24	City of Brussels, Brussels	Winner
1	Athena Sorgelikis	27	City of Brussels, Brussels	Runner-up
1	Susan	26	Ghent, Flanders	3rd
1	Mademoiselle Boop	37	City of Brussels, Brussels	4th
1	Peach	23	Liège, Wallonia	5th
1	Valenciaga	26	Ghent, Flanders	6th
1	Mocca Bone	35	City of Brussels, Brussels	7th
1	Edna Sorgelsen	34	Liège, Wallonia	8th
1	Amanda Tears	21	Mouscron, Wallonia	9th
1	Brittany Von Bottoks	35	Mons, Wallonia	10th
2	Alvilda	29	City of Brussels, Brussels	Winner
2	La Veuve	37	City of Brussels, Brussels	Runner-up
2	Gabanna	27	City of Brussels, Brussels	3rd
2	Loulou Velvet	31	City of Brussels, Brussels	3rd
2	Chloe Clarke	27	Ghent, Flanders	5th
2	Star	43	Antwerp, Flanders	6th
2	Morphæ	23	City of Brussels, Brussels	7th
2	Madame Yoko	33	Luxembourg City, Luxembourg	8th
2	Sarah Logan	35	Liège, Wallonia	9th

=== Drag Race Brasil ===
Drag Race Brasil premiered in 2023. It has crowned two winners: Organzza and Ruby Nox.

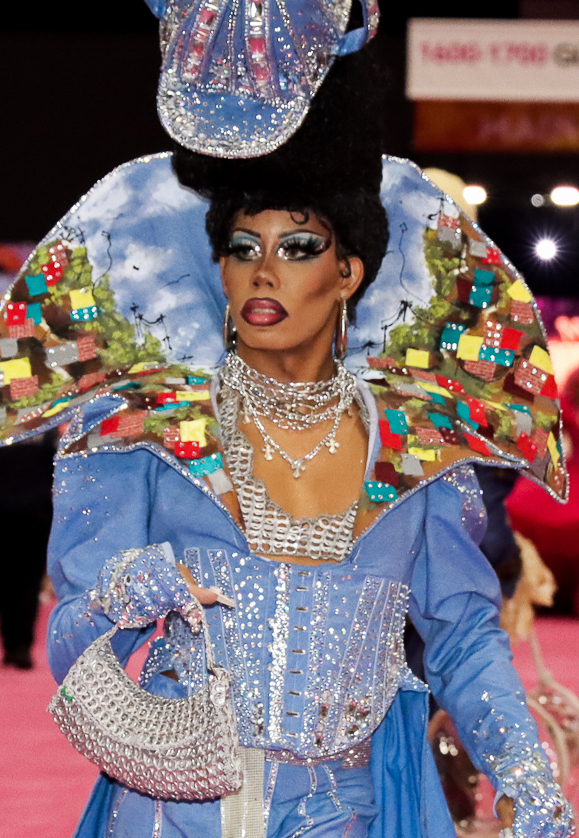
Season 1 winner
Organzza

Contestants of Drag Race Brasil and their backgrounds
Season	Contestant	Age	Hometown	Outcome
1	Organzza	30	Rio de Janeiro, Rio de Janeiro	Winner
1	Betina Polaroid	46	Rio de Janeiro, Rio de Janeiro	Runners-up
1	Hellena Malditta	23	Salvador, Bahia	Runners-up
1	Miranda Lebrão	33	Rio de Janeiro, Rio de Janeiro	Runners-up
1	Shannon Skarllet	24	Piraúba, Minas Gerais	5th
1	Naza	22	Monte Santo de Minas, Minas Gerais	6th
1	Dallas de Vil	26	Campinas, São Paulo	7th
1	Rubi Ocean	30	Taguatinga, Distrito Federal	8th
1	Aquarela	26	Belo Horizonte, Minas Gerais	9th
1	Melusine Sparkle	26	São José do Rio Preto, São Paulo	10th
1	Tristan Soledade	34	Belém, Pará	11th
1	Diva More	42	Jaquirana, Rio Grande do Sul	12th
2	Ruby Nox	31	Carnaíba, Pernambuco	Winner
2	Mellody Queen	30	Belo Horizonte, Minas Gerais	2nd place
2	Melina Blley	30	Sapé, Paraíba	3rd place
2	Poseidon Drag	28	Recife, Pernambuco	3rd place
2	Bhelchi	37	São Paulo, São Paulo	5th place
2	Adora Black	25	Cidade Ocidental, Goiás	6th place
2	DesiRée Beck	34	Irecê, Bahia	7th place
2	Mercedez Vulcão	37	Vinhedo, São Paulo	8th place
2	Paola Hoffmann Van Cartier	36	Vila Velha, Espírito Santo	9th place
2	Chanel	22	Niterói, Rio de Janeiro	10th place

=== Drag Race Down Under ===
RuPaul's Drag Race Down Under premiered in 2021, and later became known as Drag Race Down Under. It was the first series in the franchise to cast competitors from multiple countries, with contestants coming from Australia and New Zealand. It has crowned four winners: Kita Mean, Spankie Jackzon, Isis Avis Loren, and Lazy Susan.

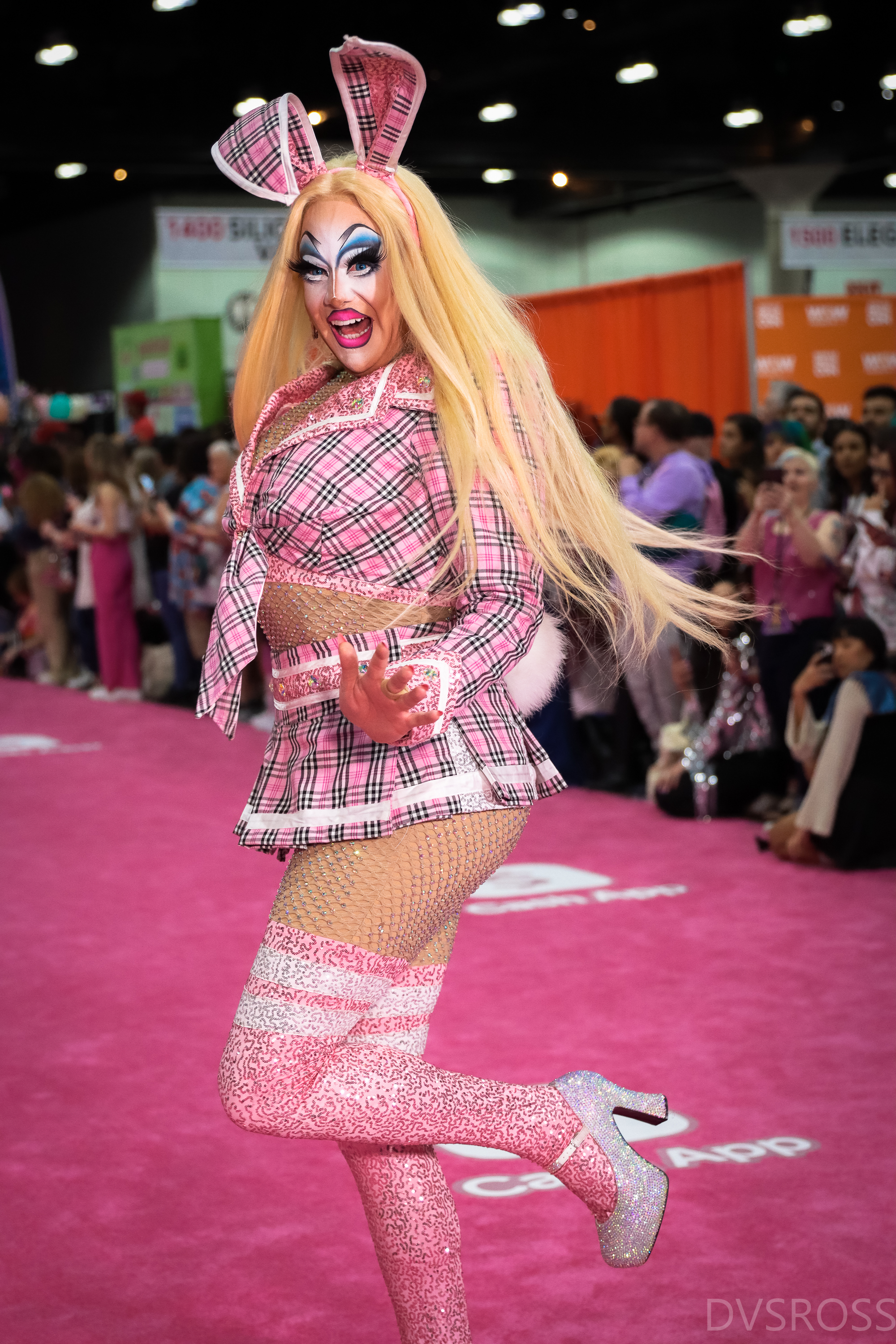
Season 1 winner
Kita Mean

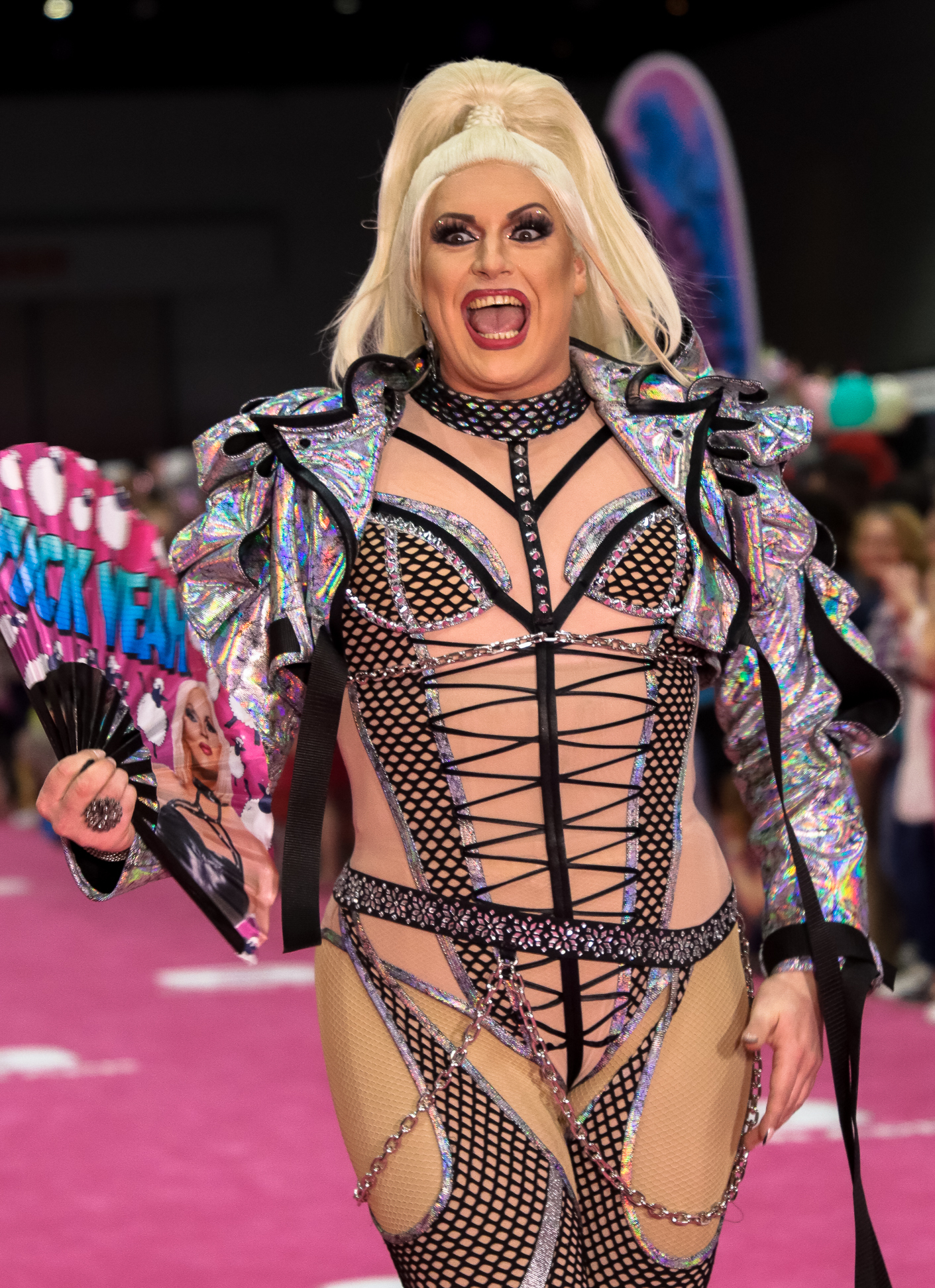
Season 2 winner
Spankie Jackzon

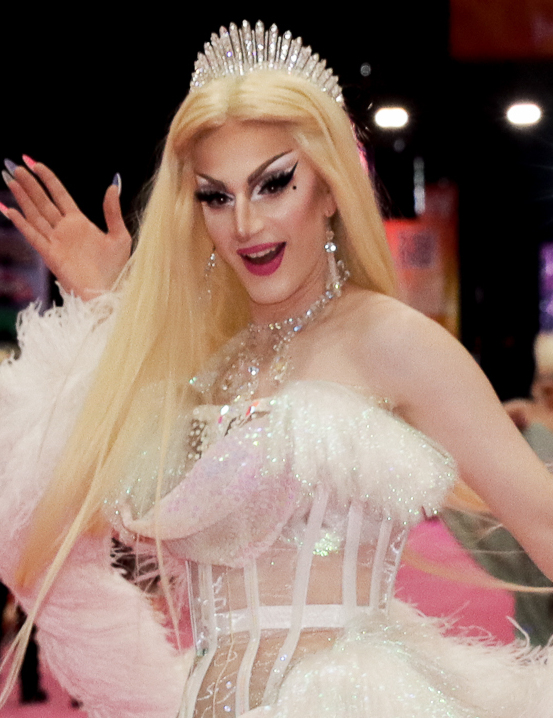
Season 3 winner
Isis Avis Loren

Contestants of RuPaul's Drag Race Down Under and their backgrounds
Season	Contestant	Age	Hometown	Outcome
1	Kita Mean	34	Auckland, Auckland, New Zealand	Winner
1	Art Simone	28	Melbourne, Victoria, Australia	Runners-up (Note: Art Simone originally placed ninth before re-entering the competition.)
1	Karen from Finance	32	Melbourne, Victoria, Australia	Runners-up
1	Scarlet Adams	27	Perth, Western Australia, Australia	Runners-up
1	Elektra Shock	28	Auckland, Auckland, New Zealand	5th
1	Maxi Shield†	46	Ballina, New South Wales, Australia	6th
1	Etcetera Etcetera	22	Canberra, Australian Capital, Australia	7th
1	Anita Wigl'it	31	Leigh, Auckland, New Zealand	8th
1	Coco Jumbo	29	Coffs Harbour, New South Wales, Australia	9th
1	Jojo Zaho	30	Newcastle, New South Wales, Australia	10th
2	Spankie Jackzon	37	Palmerston North, Manawatū-Whanganui, New Zealand	Winner
2	Hannah Conda	30	Sydney, New South Wales, Australia	Runners-up
2	Kween Kong	29	Adelaide, South Australia	Runners-up
2	Molly Poppinz	30	Newcastle, New South Wales, Australia	4th
2	Beverly Kills	21	Brisbane, Queensland, Australia	5th
2	Yuri Guaii	25	Auckland, Auckland, New Zealand	6th
2	Minnie Cooper	49	Sydney, New South Wales, Australia	7th
2	Pomara Fifth	28	Sydney, New South Wales, Australia	8th
2	Aubrey Haive	25	Timaru, Canterbury, New Zealand	9th
2	Faúx Fúr	27	Sydney, New South Wales, Australia	10th
3	Isis Avis Loren	33	Melbourne, Victoria, Australia	Winner
3	Gabriella Labucci	31	Ballarat, Victoria, Australia	Runner-up
3	Flor	25	Auckland, Auckland, New Zealand	3rd
3	Hollywould Star	34	Sydney, New South Wales, Australia	4th
3	Bumpa Love	51	Melbourne, Victoria, Australia	5th
3	Ashley Madison	25	Melbourne, Victoria, Australia	6th
3	Rita Menu	24	Hamilton, Waikato, New Zealand	7th
3	Ivanna Drink	26	Auckland, Auckland, New Zealand	8th
3	Ivory Glaze	26	Sydney, New South Wales, Australia	9th
3	Amyl	27	Sydney, New South Wales, Australia	10th
4	Lazy Susan	32	Melbourne, Victoria, Australia	Winner
4	Mandy Moobs	33	Brisbane, Queensland, Australia	Runners-up
4	Vybe	32	Sydney, New South Wales Australia	Runners-up
4	Freya Armani	24	Brisbane, Queensland, Australia	4th
4	Nikita Iman	27	Auckland, Auckland, New Zealand	5th
4	Max Drag Queen	24	Melbourne, Victoria, Australia	6th
4	Brenda Bressed	24	Melbourne, Victoria, Australia	7th
4	Lucina Innocence	28	Auckland, Auckland, New Zealand	8th
4	Karna Ford	27	Sydney, New South Wales, Australia	9th
4	Olivia Dreams	26	Wellington, Wellington, New Zealand	10th

==== Drag Race Down Under vs. the World ====
Drag Race Down Under vs. the World aired in 2026.

Contestants of Drag Race Down Under vs. the World and their backgrounds
Season	Contestant	Age	Hometown	Original season(s)	Original placement(s)	Outcome
1	Michael Marouli	41	Newcastle upon Tyne, United Kingdom	UK 5	Runner-up	Winner
1	Art Simone	33	Melbourne, Australia	Down Under 1	Runner-up	Runner-up
1	M1ss Jade So	26	Marikina, Philippines	Philippines 2	3rd	3rd
1	VYBE	34	Sydney, Australia	Down Under 4	Runner-up	3rd
1	LaLa Ri	35	Atlanta, United States	US 13	10th	5th
1	LaLa Ri	35	Atlanta, United States	US All Stars 8	5th	5th
1	Flor	28	Birmingham, United Kingdom	Down Under 3	3rd	6th
1	Coco Jumbo	34	Coffs Harbour, Australia	Down Under 1	9th	7th
1	Estrella Xtravaganza	29	Jerez de la Frontera, Spain	España 2	Runner-up	8th
1	Nikita Iman	28	Auckland, New Zealand	Down Under 4	5th	9th
1	Nicole Paige Brooks	52	Atlanta, United States	US 2	11th	10th
1	Nicole Paige Brooks	52	Atlanta, United States	US All Stars 10	11th	10th
1	Raven	46	Riverside, United States	US 2	Runner-up	—N/a (Note: Although she competed in Episode 1, it was later revealed that Raven was actually "a mole" tasked to get to know the other contestants.)
1	Raven	46	Riverside, United States	US All Stars 1	Runner-up	—N/a

=== Drag Race España ===
Drag Race España premiered in 2021. It has crowned five winners: Carmen Farala, Sharonne, Pitita, Le Cocó, and Satín Greco.

==== Drag Race España All Stars ====
Drag Race España All Stars premiered in 2024. It featured previous competitors from Drag Race España and has crowned one winner: Drag Sethlas.

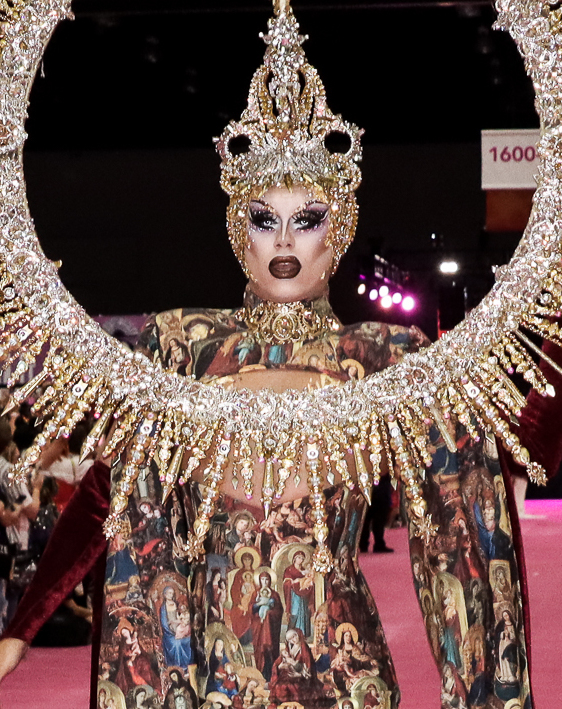
Season 1 winner
Drag Sethlas

Contestants of Drag Race España All Stars and their backgrounds
Season	Contestant	Age	Hometown	Original season	Original placement	Outcome
1	Drag Sethlas	31	Las Palmas, Canary Islands	Season 2	6th	Winner
1	Samantha Ballentines	36	Cádiz, Andalusia	Season 2	10th	Runner-up
1	Hornella Góngora	35	Alicante, Valencian Community	Season 3	3rd	3rd
1	Juriji der Klee	32	Brussels, Belgium	Season 2	5th	3rd
1	Pupi Poisson	41	Madrid, Community of Madrid	Season 1	4th	5th
1	Sagittaria	24	Barcelona, Catalonia	Season 1	Runner-up	6th
1	Pakita (Note: Now Pakita, she is referred to as Fransiska Tólika on The Switch Drag Race season 2.)	29	Seville, Andalusia	The Switch 2	15th	7th
1	Pakita	29	Seville, Andalusia	Season 3	7th	7th
1	Onyx Unleashed (Note: Now Onyx Unleashed, she is referred to as Onyx on season 2.)	34	Madrid, Community of Madrid	Season 2	8th	8th
1	Pink Chadora	38	Málaga, Andalusia	Season 3	7th	9th

=== Drag Race France ===
Drag Race France premiered in 2022. Its third season is the fifth, after The Switch 2, All Stars 3, All Stars 7, and Canada vs. the World 1, to feature a previous Drag Race winner returning to compete again. It has crowned four winners: Paloma, Keiona, Le Filip, and Lana Cotta.

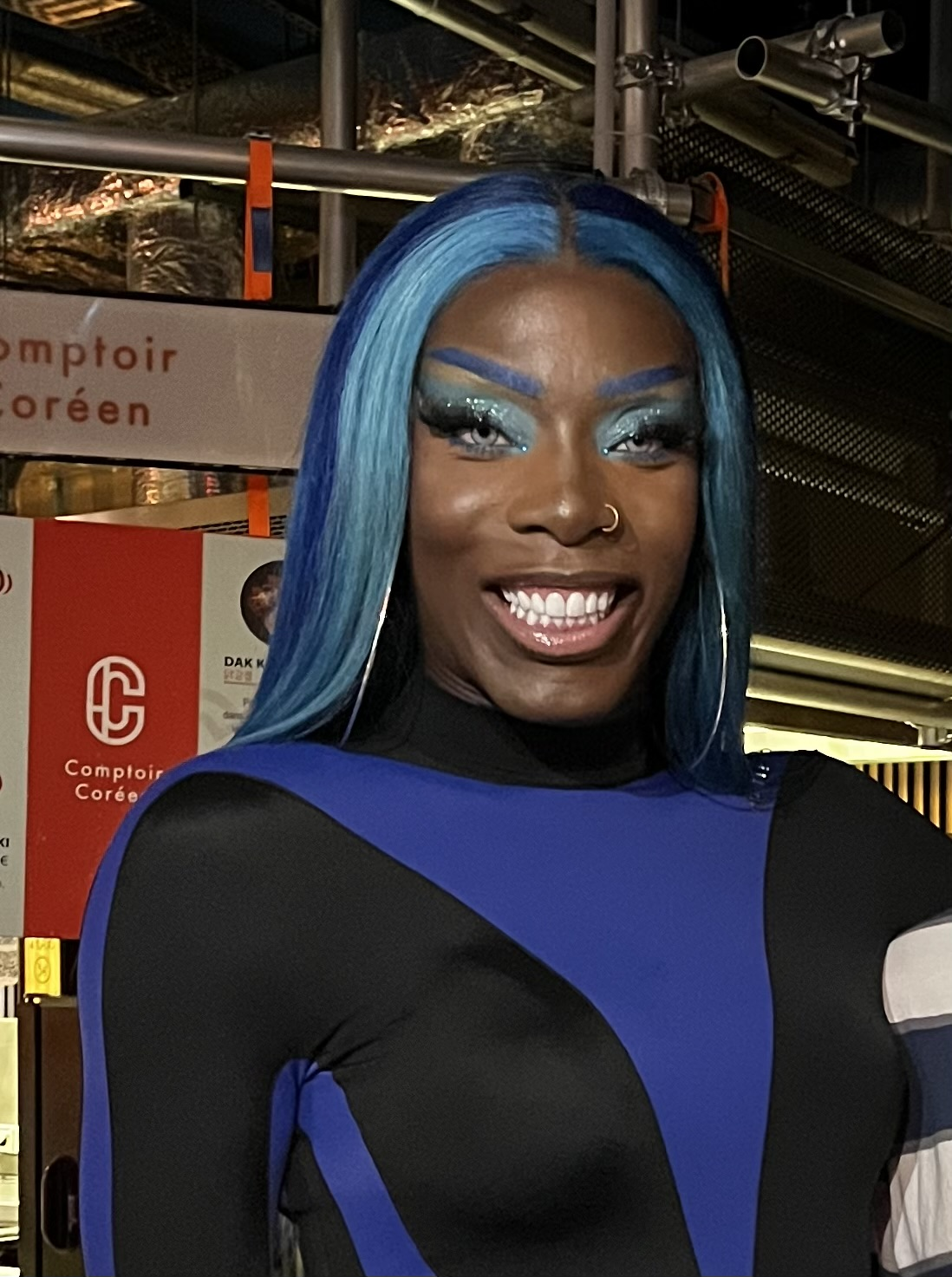
Season 2 winner
Keiona

Contestants of Drag Race France and their backgrounds
Season	Contestant	Age	Hometown	Outcome
1	Paloma	30	Clermont-Ferrand, Auvergne-Rhône-Alpes	Winner
1	La Grande Dame	23	Nice, Provence-Alpes-Côte d'Azur	Runners-up
1	Soa de Muse	33	Saint-Denis, Île-de-France	Runners-up
1	Lolita Banana	32	Paris, Île-de-France	4th
1	La Big Bertha	36	Paris, Île-de-France	5th
1	Elips	26	Bordeaux, Nouvelle-Aquitaine	6th
1	Kam Hugh	23	Paris, Île-de-France	7th
1	La Briochée	31	Palaiseau, Île-de-France	8th
1	Lova Ladiva	32	Toulouse, Occitania	9th
1	La Kahena	29	Paris, Île-de-France	10th
2	Keiona	31	Paris, Île-de-France	Winner
2	Sara Forever	33	Bordeaux, Nouvelle-Aquitaine	Runner-up
2	Mami Watta	24	Saint-Denis, Île-de-France	3rd
2	Punani	32	Paris, Île-de-France	3rd
2	Piche	26	Arles, Provence-Alpes-Côte d'Azur	5th (Note: Piche originally placed eighth before re-entering the competition.)
2	Cookie Kunty	29	Paris, Île-de-France	6th
2	Moon	31	Geneva, Switzerland	7th
2	Ginger Bitch	44	Nice, Provence-Alpes-Côte d'Azur	8th
2	Kitty Space	27	Lyon, Auvergne-Rhône-Alpes	9th
2	Vespi	23	Lille, Hauts-de-France	10th
2	Rose	32	Paris, Île-de-France	11th
3	Le Filip	29	Paris, Île-de-France	Winner
3	Ruby on the Nail	34	Marseille, Provence-Alpes-Côte d'Azur	Runner-up
3	Leona Winter (Note: Now Leona Winter, she is referred to as Miss Leona on The Switch season 2.)	28	Narbonne, Occitanie	3rd
3	Lula Strega	26	Marseille, Provence-Alpes-Côte d'Azur	3rd
3	Misty Phoenix	23	Avignon, Provence-Alpes-Côte d'Azur	5th
3	Perseo	21	Las Palmas, Spain	6th
3	Norma Bell	25	Saint-Denis, Réunion	7th
3	Edeha Noire	34	Lyon, Auvergne-Rhône-Alpes	8th
3	Magnetica	24	Paris, Île-de-France	9th
3	Afrodite Amour	27	Lyon, Auvergne-Rhône-Alpes	10th
4	Lana Cotta	22	Marseille, Provence-Alpes-Côte d'Azur	Winner
4	Daisy Superbitch	33	Brussels, Belgium	Runner-up
4	Azémylia	27	Paris, Île-de-France	3rd
4	Sublyme	31	Paris, Île-de-France	3rd
4	La Harpie	27	Lille, Hauts-de-France	5th
4	Fluffy Bidule	27	Bordeaux, Nouvelle-Aquitaine	6th
4	Holly White	40	Cannes, Provence-Alpes-Côte d'Azur	7th
4	Margarette	26	Paris, Île-de-France	8th
4	Malawitte	26	Paris, Île-de-France	9th
4	Créatine Price	35	New York City, United States	10th

==== Drag Race France All Stars ====
Drag Race France All Stars premiered in 2025. It featured previous competitors from Drag Race France.

Contestants of Drag Race France All Stars and their backgrounds
Season	Contestant	Age	Hometown	Original season	Original placement	Outcome
1	Mami Watta	26	Saint-Denis, Île-de-France	Season 2	3rd	Winner
1	Elips	28	Bordeaux, Nouvelle-Aquitaine	Season 1	6th	Runner-up
1	Misty Phoenix	24	Paris, Île-de-France	Season 3	5th	3rd
1	Piche	28	Paris, Île-de-France	Season 2	5th	3rd
1	Moon	33	Geneva, Switzerland	Season 2	7th	5th
1	Kam Hugh	26	Paris, Île-de-France	Season 1	7th	6th
1	La Big Bertha	40	Paris, Île-de-France	Season 1	5th	7th
1	Punani	34	Paris, Île-de-France	Season 2	3rd	8th
1	Soa de Muse	36	Saint-Denis, Île-de-France	Season 1	Runner-up	9th
1	Soa de Muse	36	Saint-Denis, Île-de-France	Global All Stars 1	9th	9th
1	Magnetica	25	Paris, Île-de-France	Season 3	9th	10th

=== Drag Race Germany ===
Drag Race Germany premiered in 2023. It is the second series in the franchise after Down Under to cast competitors from multiple countries, with queens coming from Austria, Germany, and Switzerland. It has crowned one winner: Pandora Nox.

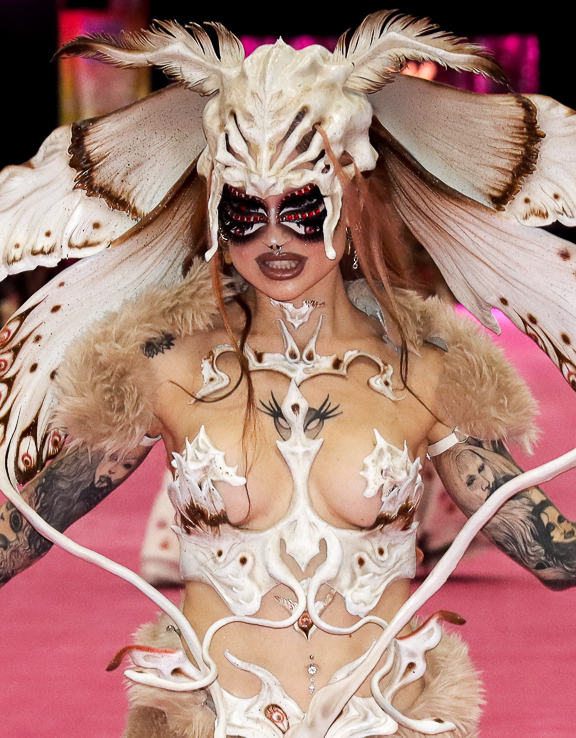
Season 1 winner
Pandora Nox

Contestants of Drag Race Germany and their backgrounds
Season	Contestant	Age	Hometown	Outcome
1	Pandora Nox	29	Vienna, Vienna, Austria	Winner
1	Metamorkid	24	Vienna, Vienna, Austria	Runners-up
1	Yvonne Nightstand	29	Berlin, Berlin, Germany	Runners-up
1	Kelly Heelton	41	Wiesbaden, Hesse, Germany	4th
1	Loreley Rivers	24	Düsseldorf, North Rhine-Westphalia, Germany	5th
1	Victoria Shakespears	29	Basel, Basel-Stadt, Switzerland	6th
1	Nikita Vegaz	38	Berlin, Berlin, Germany	7th
1	Tessa Testicle	25	Basel, Basel-Stadt, Switzerland	8th
1	LéLé Cocoon	23	Frankfurt, Hesse, Germany	9th
1	The Only Naomy	22	Cologne, North Rhine-Westphalia, Germany	10th
1	Barbie Q	25	Munich, Bavaria, Germany	11th

=== Drag Race Holland ===
Drag Race Holland premiered in 2020. It has crowned two winners: Envy Peru and Vanessa Van Cartier.

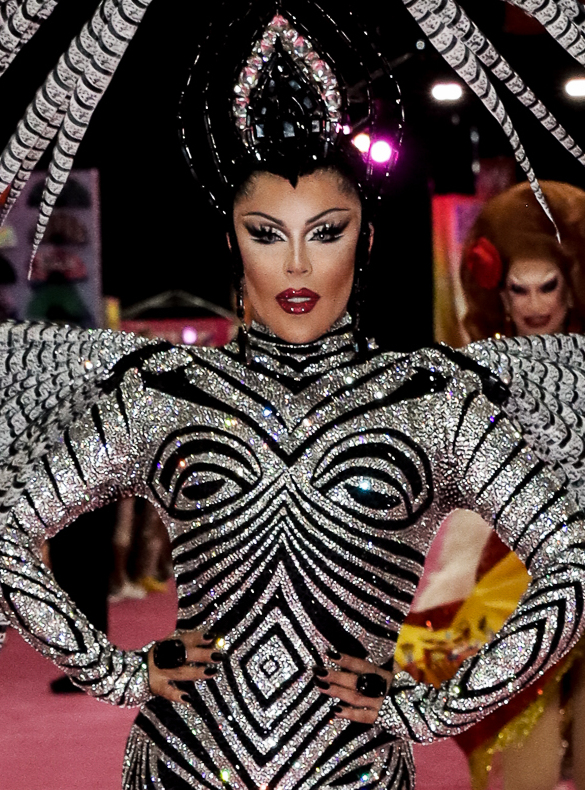
Season 1 winner
Envy Peru

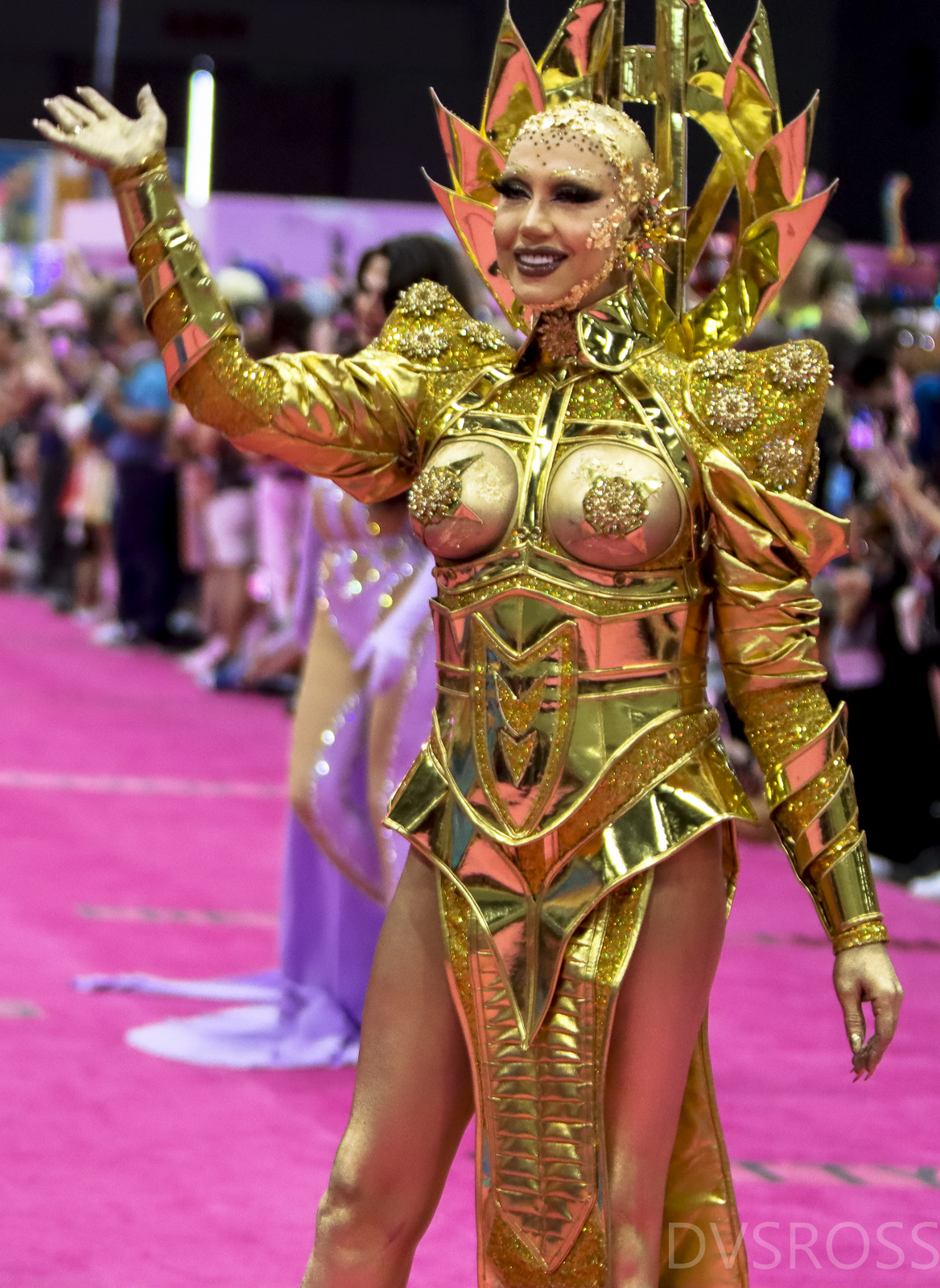
Season 2 winner
Vanessa Van Cartier

Contestants of Drag Race Holland and their backgrounds
Season	Contestant	Age	Hometown	Outcome
1	Envy Peru	31	Amsterdam, North Holland	Winner
1	Janey Jacké	28	Volendam, North Holland	Runner-up
1	Ma'Ma Queen	30	Rotterdam, South Holland	3rd
1	Miss Abby OMG	25	Belo Horizonte, Brazil	3rd
1	ChelseaBoy	26	Amsterdam, North Holland	5th
1	Sederginne	26	Antwerp, Belgium	6th
1	Madame Madness	24	Amsterdam, North Holland	7th
1	Megan Schoonbrood	32	Rotterdam, South Holland	8th
1	Patty Pam-Pam	34	Amsterdam, North Holland	9th
1	Roem	21	Urk, Flevoland	10th
2	Vanessa Van Cartier	41	Rotterdam, South Holland	Winner
2	My Little Puny	38	Amsterdam, North Holland	Runner-up
2	Vivaldi	22	Enschede, Overijssel	3rd
2	Keta Minaj	40	Amsterdam, North Holland	4th
2	Tabitha	46	Amsterdam, North Holland	5th
2	The Countess	21	Amsterdam, North Holland	6th
2	Ivy-Elyse	35	Amsterdam, North Holland	7th
2	Love Masisi	43	Amsterdam, North Holland	8th
2	Reggy B	25	Amsterdam, North Holland	9th
2	Juicy Kutoure	24	Amsterdam, North Holland	10th

=== Drag Race Italia ===
Drag Race Italia premiered in 2021. It has crowned three winners: Elecktra Bionic, La Diamond, and Lina Galore.

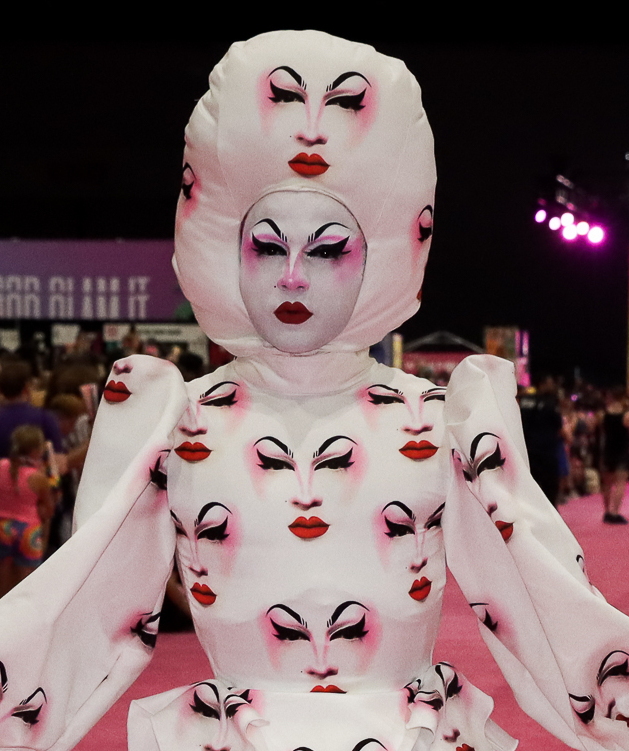
Season 3 winner
Lina Galore

Contestants of Drag Race Italia and their backgrounds
Season	Contestant	Age	Hometown	Outcome
1	Elecktra Bionic	27	Turin, Piedmont	Winner
1	Farida Kant	33	Lecce, Apulia	Runners-up
1	Le Riche	35	Palermo, Sicily	Runners-up
1	Luquisha Lubamba	33	Bologna, Emilia-Romagna	4th
1	Ava Hangar	36	Carbonia, Sardinia	5th
1	Divinity	27	Naples, Campania	6th
1	Enorma Jean	46	Milan, Lombardy	7th (Note: Enorma Jean was disqualified after losing a lip sync to stay in the competition.)
1	Ivana Vamp	32	Arezzo, Tuscany	8th
2	La Diamond	35	Riesi, Sicily	Winner
2	Aura Eternal	24	Palermo, Sicily	Runner-up
2	Nehellenia	31	Rome, Lazio	Runner-up
2	La Petite Noire	31	Palermo, Sicily	4th
2	Skandalove	33	Corato, Apulia	5th
2	Gioffré	25	New York City, United States	6th
2	Panthera Virus	29	Florence, Tuscany	7th
2	Obama	34	Rome, Lazio	8th
2	Tanissa Yoncè	28	Catania, Sicily	9th
2	Narciso	29	Rome, Lazio	10th
3	Lina Galore	34	Milan, Lombardy	Winner
3	Melissa Bianchini	36	Rome, Lazio	Runner-up
3	La Sheeva	37	Tropea, Calabria	3rd
3	Silvana Della Magliana	44	Latina, Lazio	3rd
3	Sypario	29	Caserta, Campania	5th
3	Leila Yarn	24	Palermo, Sicily	6th
3	La Prada	25	Milan, Lombardy	7th
3	Sissy Lea	44	London, United Kingdom	8th
3	Morgana Cosmica	38	Bologna, Emilia-Romagna	9th
3	Lightning Aurora	24	Cagliari, Sardinia	10th
3	Vezirja	32	Tirana, Albania	11th
3	Amy Krania	31	Brescia, Lombardy	12th
3	Adriana Picasso	29	Padua, Veneto	13th

=== Drag Race México ===
Drag Race México debuted in 2023. It has crowned two winners: Cristian Peralta and Leexa Fox.

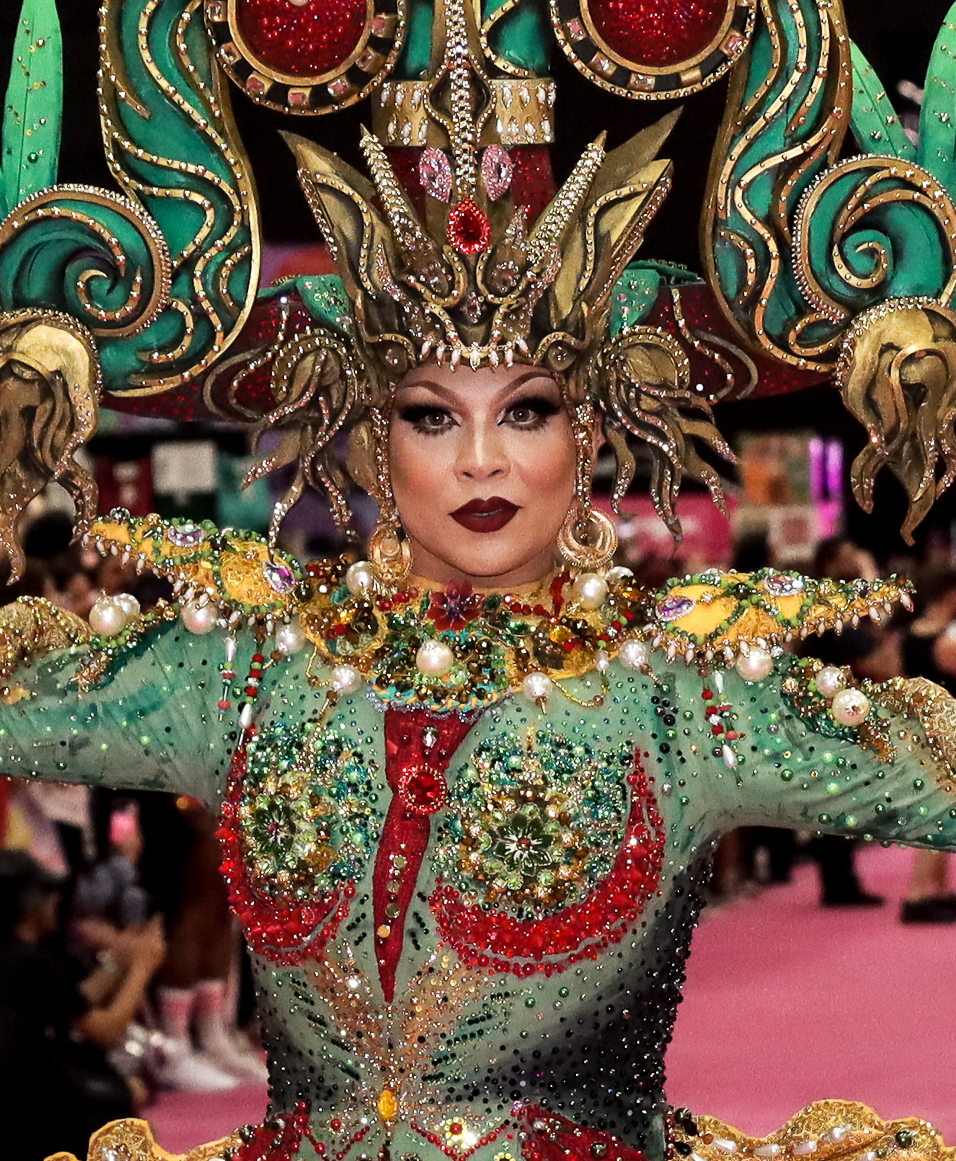
Season 1 winner
Cristian Peralta

Contestants of Drag Race México and their backgrounds
Season	Contestant	Age	Hometown	Outcome
1	Cristian Peralta	35	Guadalajara, Jalisco	Winner
1	Gala Varo	33	Morelia, Michoacán	Runners-up
1	Matraka	25	León, Guanajuato	Runners-up
1	Regina Voce	41	Mexico City	Runners-up
1	Lady Kero	33	Ocotlán de Morelos, Oaxaca	5th
1	Margaret Y Ya	28	Mexico City	6th
1	Argennis	26	Ciudad Juárez, Chihuahua	7th
1	Serena Morena	34	Aguascalientes, Aguascalientes	8th
1	Pixie Pixie	32	Mexico City	9th
1	Vermelha Noir	24	Querétaro, Querétaro	10th
1	Miss Vallarta	25	Puerto Vallarta, Jalisco	11th
2	Leexa Fox	22	Mexicali, Baja California	Winner
2	Eva Blunt	35	Mexico City	Runners-up
2	Horacio Potasio	20	Chihuahua City, Chihuahua	Runners-up
2	Jenary Bloom	27	Tepatitlán, Jalisco	Runners-up
2	Elektra Vandergeld	27	Mexico City	5th
2	Unique	27	Aguascalientes, Aguascalientes	6th
2	Luna Lansman	36	Mexico City	7th
2	Suculenta	27	Mexico City	8th
2	Ava Pocket	29	Ciudad Madero, Tamaulipas	9th
2	Garçonne	29	Querétaro, Querétaro	10th
2	María Bonita	31	Monterrey, Nuevo León	11th
2	Nina de la Fuente	33	Mexico City	12th
2	Ignus Ars	23	Aguascalientes, Aguascalientes	13th

==== Drag Race México: Latina Royale ====
Drag Race México: Latina Royale is expected to air in 2026.

Contestants of Drag Race México: Latina Royale and their backgrounds
Season	Contestant	Age	Hometown	Original season(s)	Original placement(s)	Outcome
1	Elektra Vandergeld	28	Mexico City, Mexico	México 2	5th	Winner
1	Matraka	27	León, Mexico	México 1	Runner-up (Note: Matraka was voted Fan Favourite on her original season.)	Runner-up
1	Eva Blunt	37	Mexico City, Mexico	México 2	Runner-up	3rd place
1	Regina Voce	44	Mexico City, Mexico	México 1	Runner-up	3rd place
1	Alexis Mateo	46	Las Vegas, United States	US 3	3rd	5th
1	Alexis Mateo	46	Las Vegas, United States	US All Stars 1	5th	5th
1	Alexis Mateo	46	Las Vegas, United States	US All Stars 5	5th	5th
1	Alexis Mateo	46	Las Vegas, United States	Canada vs. the World 2	Runner-up	5th
1	Mariana Stars	30	Mérida, Venezuela	España 4	5th	6th
1	Horacio Potasio	22	Mexico City, Mexico	México 2	Runner-up	7th
1	Xunami Muse	36	Colón, Panama	US 16	9th (Note: Xunami Muse was voted Miss Congeniality on her original season.)	8th
1	Miss Abby OMG	31	Breda, Netherlands	Holland 1	3rd	9th
1	DesiRée Beck	35	Irecê, Brazil	Brasil 2	7th	10th
1	Barbie Q	28	Munich, Germany	Germany 1	11th	11th

=== Drag Race Philippines ===
Drag Race Philippines premiered in 2022. It has crowned three winners: Precious Paula Nicole, Captivating Katkat and Maxie.

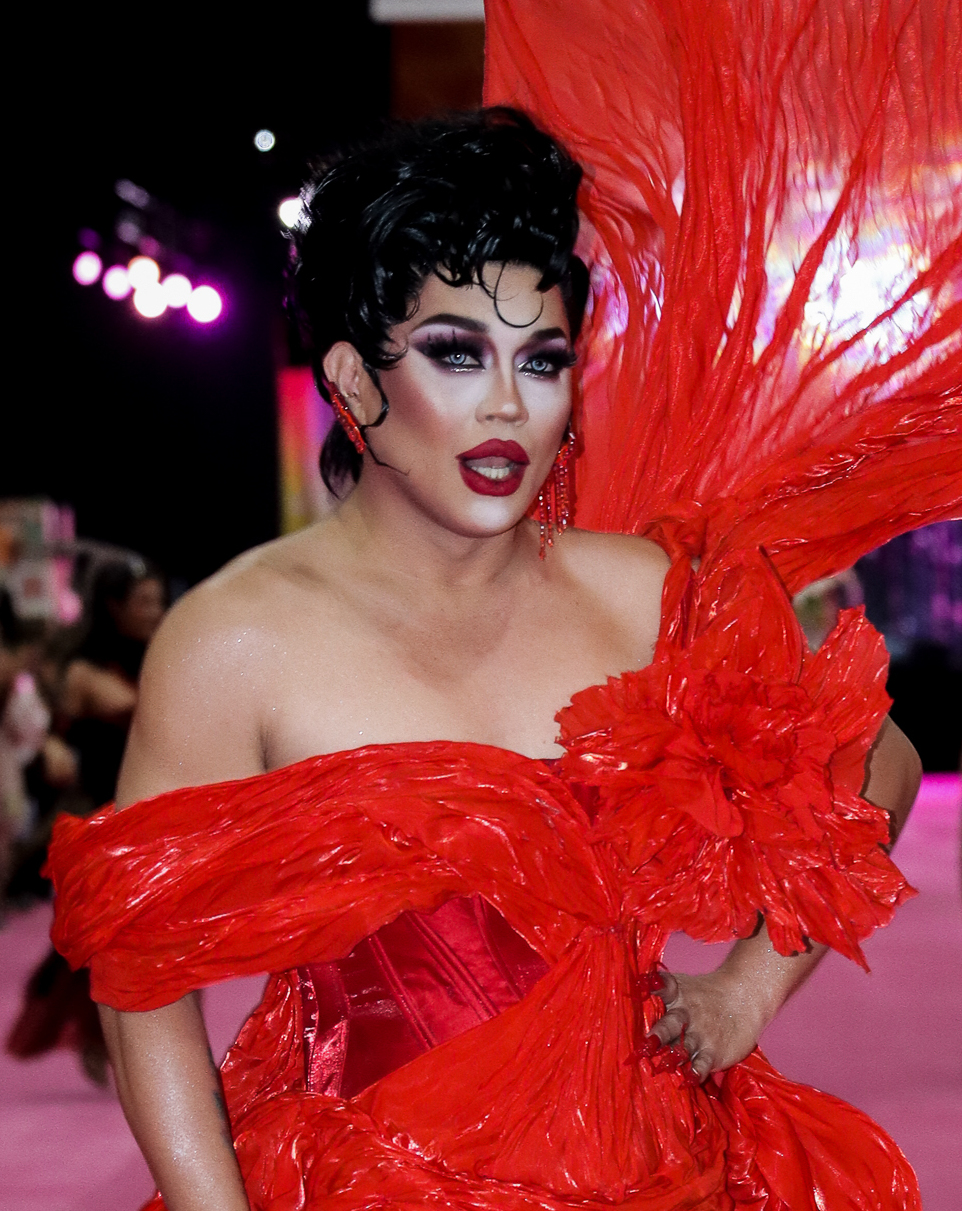
Season 1 winner
Precious Paula Nicole

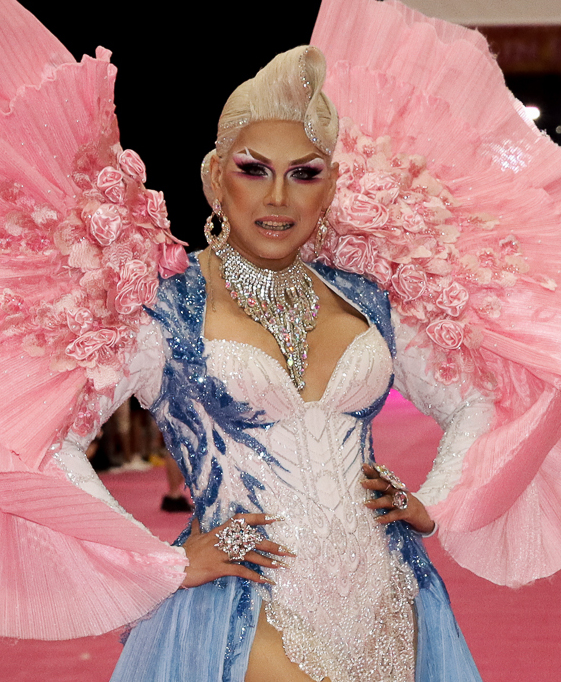
Season 2 winner
Captivating Katkat

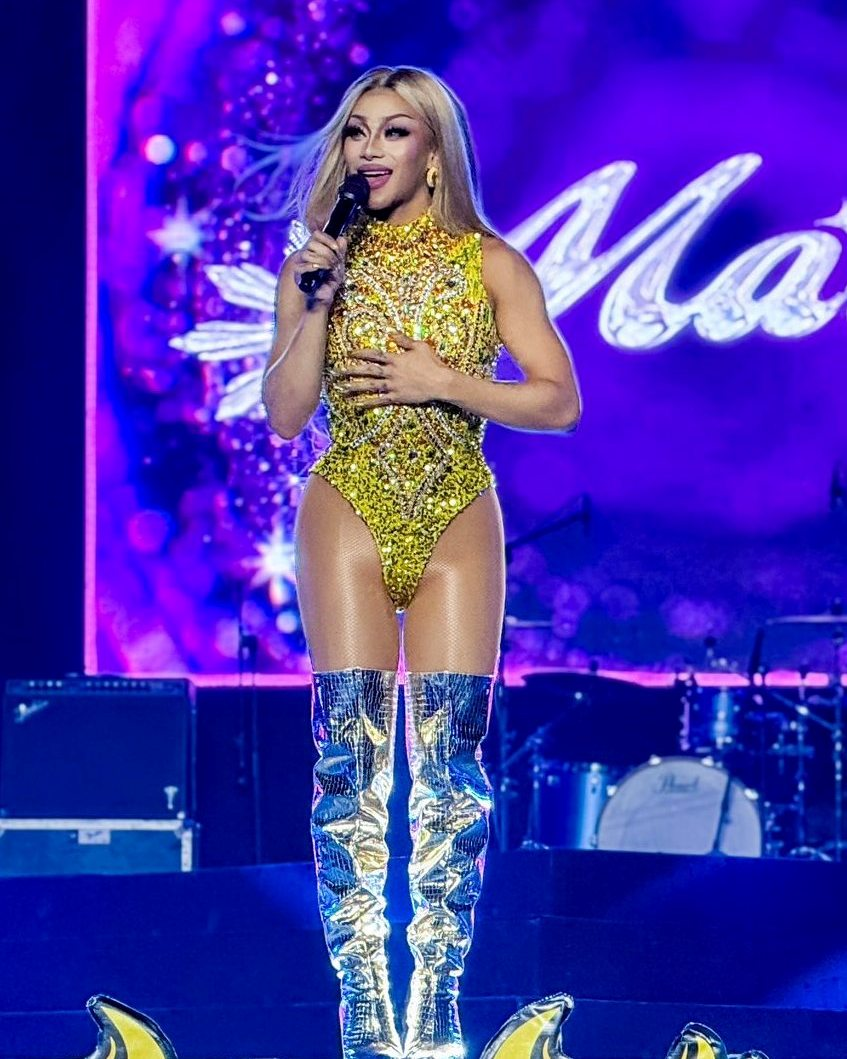
Season 3 winner
Maxie

Contestants of Drag Race Philippines and their backgrounds
Season	Contestant	Age	Hometown	Outcome
1	Precious Paula Nicole	35	Daet, Camarines Norte	Winner
1	Marina Summers	25	Quezon City, Metro Manila	Runner-up
1	Eva Le Queen	32	Marikina, Metro Manila	3rd
1	Xilhouete	34	Cabanatuan, Nueva Ecija	3rd
1	Minty Fresh	31	Quezon City, Metro Manila	5th
1	Brigiding	29	Mandaluyong, Metro Manila	6th
1	Viñas DeLuxe	25	San Jose del Monte, Bulacan	7th
1	Lady Morgana	30	Davao City, Davao Region	8th
1	Turing	29	Cainta, Rizal	9th
1	Gigi Era	38	Melbourne, Australia	10th
1	Corazon	34	Bolinao, Pangasinan	11th
1	Prince	25	Calumpit, Bulacan	12th
2	Captivating Katkat	42	Santa Maria, Ilocos Sur	Winner
2	Arizona Brandy	25	Quezon City, Metro Manila	Runner-up
2	Bernie	35	Mandaluyong, Metro Manila	3rd
2	M1ss Jade So	23	Marikina, Metro Manila	3rd
2	Hana Beshie	24	Cagayan de Oro, Misamis Oriental	5th
2	ØV Cünt	24	Rosario, Cavite	5th
2	DeeDee Marié Holliday	38	Tayabas, Quezon	7th
2	Matilduh	24	Vigan, Ilocos Sur	8th
2	Veruschka Levels	36	Hong Kong, China	9th
2	Tiny DeLuxe	22	Pasig, Metro Manila	10th
2	Astrid Mercury	29	Mandaluyong, Metro Manila	11th (Note: Nicole Pardaux and Astrid Mercury competed respectively on the first and second episodes but, being eliminated in the two premieres, neither was in a higher place than the other.)
2	Nicole Pardaux	37	Cebu City, Cebu	11th
3	Maxie	24	Manila, Metro Manila	Winner
3	Khianna	22	Cagayan de Oro, Misamis Oriental	Runner-up
3	Angel	23	Manila, Metro Manila	3rd
3	Tita Baby	46	Marikina, Metro Manila	3rd
3	Zymba Ding	22	Caloocan, Metro Manila	5th
3	Myx Chanel	27	Marikina, Metro Manila	6th
3	Popstar Bench	26	Manila, Metro Manila	7th
3	John Fedellaga	33	San Francisco, United States	8th
3	J Quinn	25	Caloocan, Metro Manila	9th
3	Yudipota	27	Bacolod, Negros Occidental	10th
3	Versex	25	Manila, Metro Manila	11th
4	Katana	24	Santiago, Isabela	TBA
4	Manza	31	Nabunturan, Davao de Oro	TBA
4	Maureen Biology	27	Baguio, Benguet	TBA
4	Taylor Sheesh	31	Antipolo, Rizal	TBA
4	Valeria (Note: Valeria Ortega is referred to as Valeria on the show.)	28	Manila, Metro Manila	TBA
4	Merckz	28	Antipolo, Rizal	6th
4	Andy Crocker	34	Caloocan, Metro Manila	7th
4	Bhorj Gum	28	Bacolod, Negros Occidental	8th
4	Bombalicious Eklaver	46	Washington, D.C., USA	9th
4	Ghulli Ghush	30	Cavite City, Cavite	10th
4	Dixxxy Decoy	23	Davao City, Davao Del Sur	11th
4	Misua†	27	Cagayan de Oro, Misamis Oriental	† (Note: Misua died during filming and received no official placement.)

==== Drag Race Philippines: Slaysian Royale ====
Drag Race Philippines: Slaysian Royale premiered in 2025. It is the fourth series, following UK vs. the World, Canada vs. the World, and Global All Stars to feature returning contestants from across the international installments of the franchise.

Along with contestants from the Philippine edition, it also features competitors from the American, Belgian, British, Canadian, Down Under, French, and Thai franchises.

Drag Race Philippines: Slaysian Royale contestants and their backgrounds
Season	Contestant	Age	Hometown	Original season	Original placement	Outcome
1	Brigiding	33	Mandaluyong, Metro Manila	Philippines 1	6th	Winner
1	Viñas DeLuxe	28	San Jose del Monte, Philippines	Philippines 1	7th	Runner-up
1	Arizona Brandy	28	Makati, Philippines	Philippines 2	Runner-up	3rd
1	Suki Doll	31	Montréal, Canada	Canada 2	9th	3rd
1	Khianna	23	Cagayan de Oro, Philippines	Philippines 3	Runner-up	5th
1	Yuhua (Note: Formerly known as Yuhua Hamasaki, she is simply referred to as Yuhua for the series.)	35	New York City, United States	US 10	12th	6th
1	Siam Phusri	35	San Francisco, United States	Thailand 3	7th	7th
1	Bernie (Note: Bernie Barrantes is simply referred to as Bernie for the series.)	38	Mandaluyong, Philippines	Philippines 2	3rd	8th
1	Kitty Space	29	Paris, France	France 2	9th	9th
1	Ivory Glaze	28	Sydney, Australia	Down Under 3	9th	10th
1	Sum Ting Wong	36	Reading, United Kingdom	UK 1	7th	11th
1	Madame Yoko	34	Luxembourg City, Luxembourg	Belgique 2	8th	12th

=== Drag Race Sverige ===
Drag Race Sverige premiered in 2023. It has crowned one winner: Admira Thunderpussy.

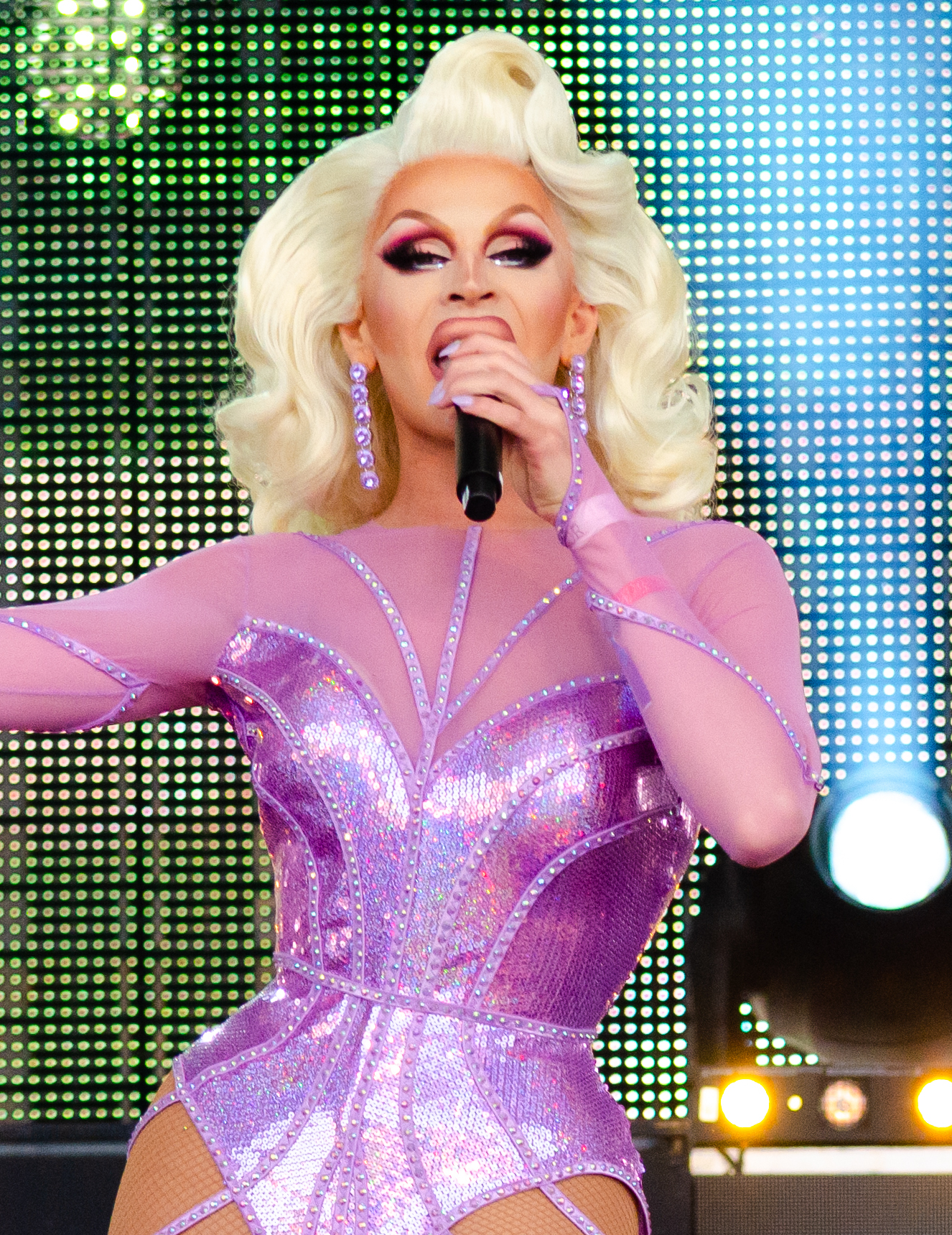
Season 1 winner
Admira Thunderpussy

Contestants of Drag Race Sverige and their backgrounds
Season	Contestant	Age	Hometown	Outcome
1	Admira Thunderpussy	28	Stockholm, Stockholm County	Winner
1	Fontana	29	São Leopoldo, Brazil	Runner-up
1	Vanity Vain	31	Linköping, Östergötland County	3rd
1	Elecktra	35	Helsingborg, Skåne County	4th
1	Antonina Nutshell	28	Liverpool, United Kingdom	5th (Note: Antonina Nutshell originally placed eighth before re-entering the competition.)
1	Santana Sexmachine	28	Berlin, Germany	6th
1	Imaa Queen	28	Värnamo, Jönköping County	7th
1	Endigo	30	Tokyo, Japan	8th
1	Almighty Aphroditey	20	Mora, Dalarna County	9th

=== Drag Race Thailand ===
Drag Race Thailand premiered in 2018. It has crowned three winners: Natalia Pliacam, Angele Anang and Frankie Wonga.

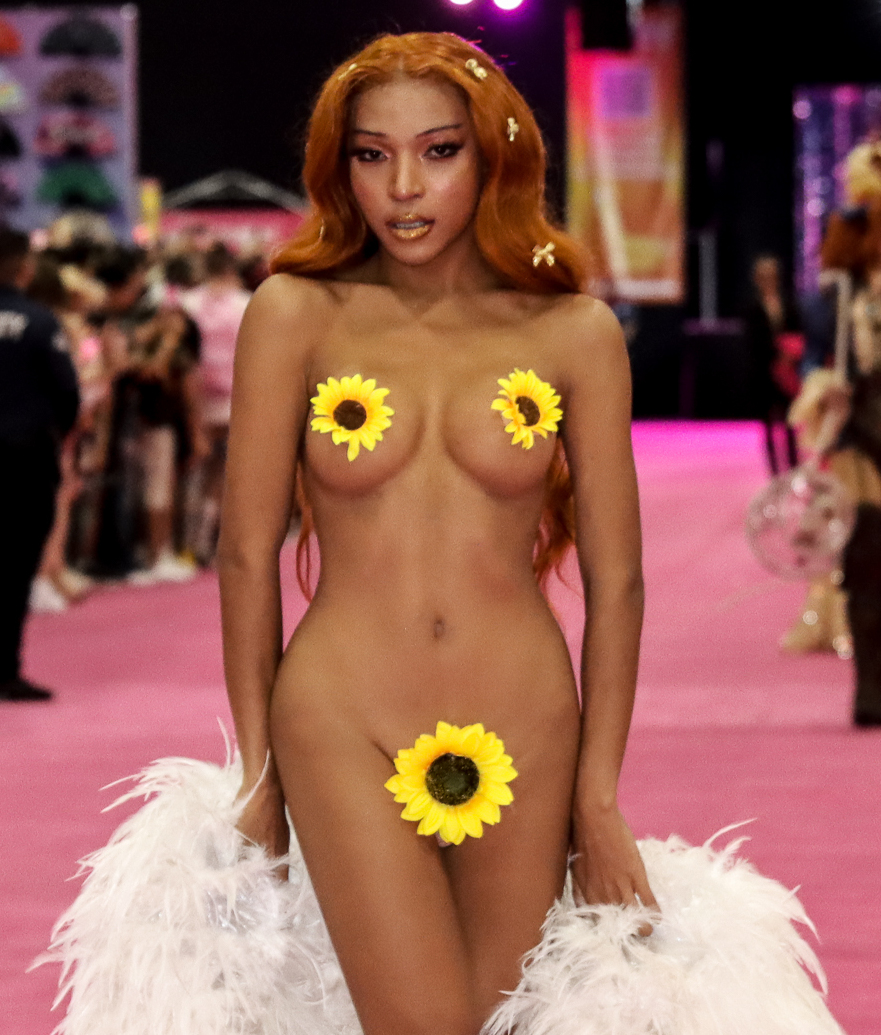
Season 2 winner
Angele Anang

Contestants of Drag Race Thailand and their backgrounds
Season	Contestant	Age	Hometown	Outcome
1	Natalia Pliacam	37	Bangkok	Winner
1	Année Maywong	30	Bangkok	Runners-up
1	Dearis Doll	30	Nakhon Pathom	Runners-up
1	B Ella	30	Nakhon Ratchasima	4th
1	Amadiva	24	Bangkok	5th
1	JAJA	34	Philippines	5th
1	Petchra	30	Rayong	7th
1	Morrigan	18	Bangkok	8th
1	Bunny Be Fly	25	Nakhon Ratchasima	9th
1	Meannie Minaj	26	Phrae	10th
2	Angele Anang	24	Nakhon Ratchasima	Winner
2	Kana Warrior	29	Nakhon Sawan	Runners-up (Note: Kana Warrior placed ninth before re-entering the competition.) (Note: Kandy Zyanide placed eleventh before re-entering the competition.)
2	Kandy Zyanide	26	Chiang Mai	Runners-up
2	Bandit†	34	Phrae	4th
2	Vanda Miss Joaquim	29	Singapore	4th
2	Srimala	29	Udon Thani	6th
2	Tormai	28	Nakhon Si Thammarat	7th
2	Genie	30	Hong Kong, China	8th
2	Miss Gimhuay	24	Chonburi	9th (Note: On episode 5, Miss Gimhuay was disqualified for bringing props from outside the Werkroom, a violation of the competition's rules.)
2	Mocha Diva	30	Hong Kong, China	10th
2	Maya B'Haro	33	Phuket	11th
2	Katy Killer	24	Bangkok	12th
2	Silver Sonic	22	Khon Kaen	13th
2	M Stranger Fox	33	Bangkok	14th
3	Frankie Wonga	30	Bangkok	Winner
3	Zepee	29	Phrae	Runner-up
3	Gawdland	22	Chiang Mai	3rd
3	Spicy Sunshine	30	Bangkok	3rd
3	Nane Sphera	33	Chiang Mai	5th
3	Gigi Ferocious	28	Bangkok	6th
3	Siam Phusri	34	San Francisco, United States	7th
3	Benze Diva	42	Samut Prakan	8th
3	Shortgun	22	Chiang Mai	9th
3	Kara Might	27	Ratchaburi	10th
3	Srirasha Hotsauce	27	Bangkok	11th

=== RuPaul's Drag Race UK ===
RuPaul's Drag Race UK premiered in 2019. It has crowned eight winners: The Vivienne, Lawrence Chaney, Krystal Versace, Danny Beard, Ginger Johnson, Kyran Thrax, Bones, and Flesh.

==== RuPaul's Drag Race: UK vs. the World ====
RuPaul's Drag Race: UK vs. the World premiered in 2022. Like All Stars, this season featured previous contestants returning to compete again but, in a first for the franchise, contestants from different international versions were asked to participate. The spin-off has crowned three winners: Blu Hydrangea, Tia Kofi, and Gawdland.

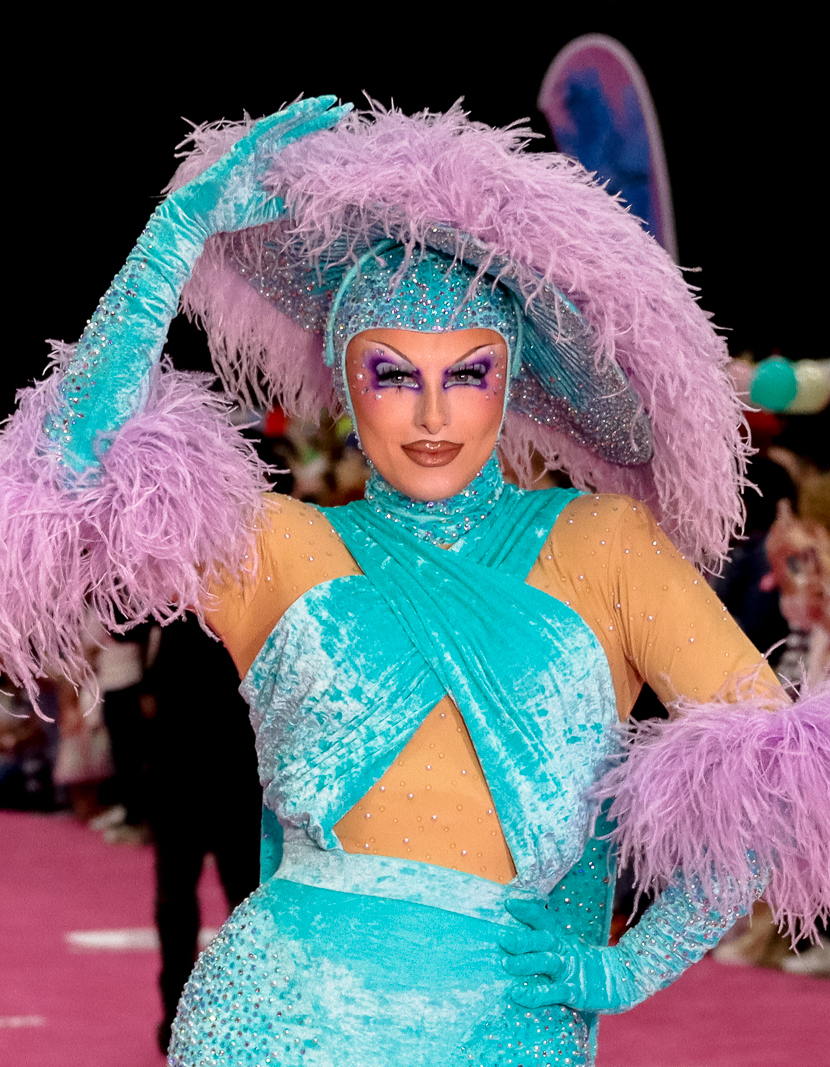
Series 1 winner
Blu Hydrangea

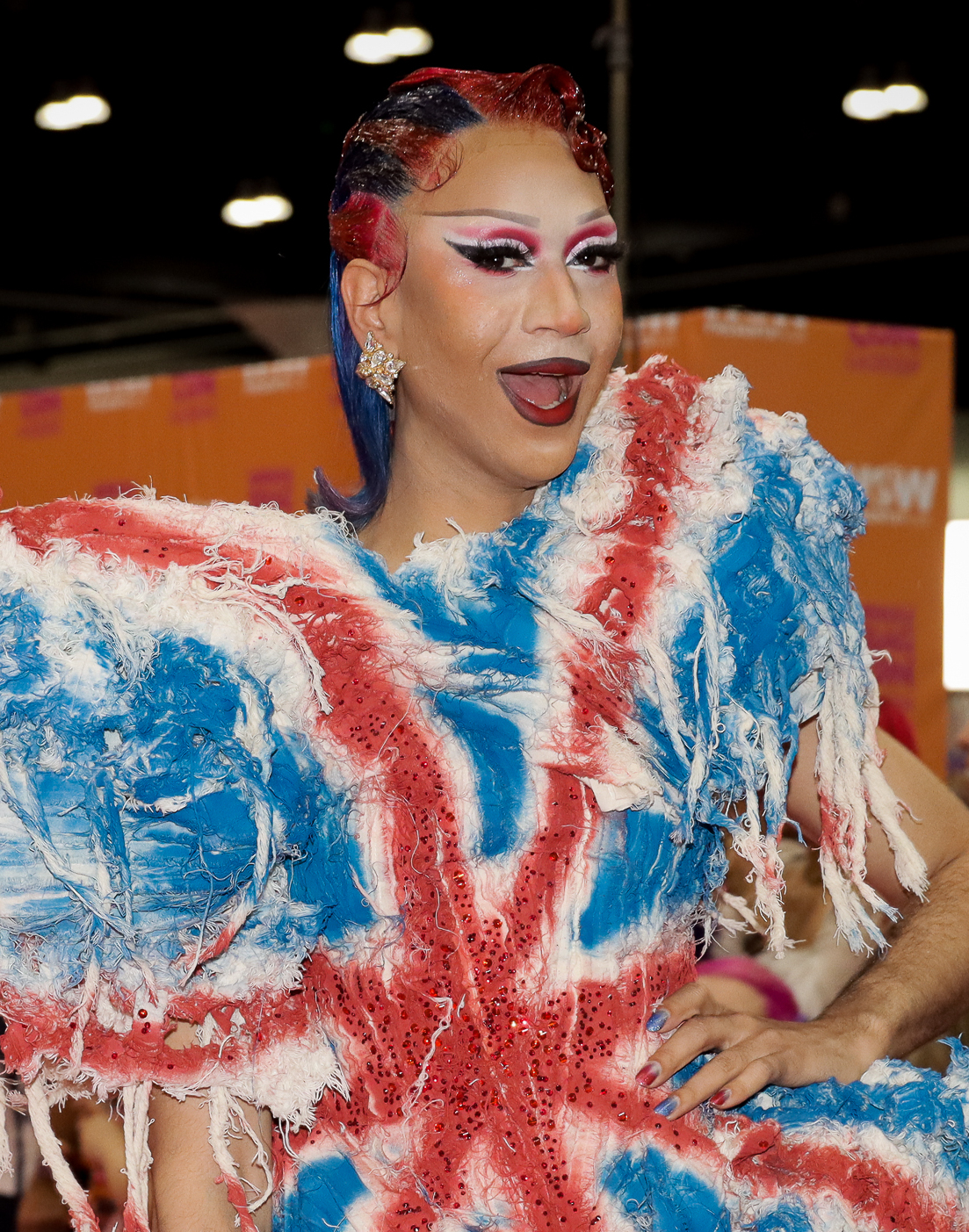
Series 2 winner
Tia Kofi

Contestants of RuPaul's Drag Race: UK vs. the World and their backgrounds
Series	Contestant	Age	Hometown	Original season(s)	Original placement(s)	Outcome
1	Blu Hydrangea	25	Belfast, United Kingdom	UK 1	5th	Winner
1	Mo Heart (Note: Now Mo Heart, she was referred to as Monique Heart on season 10 and All Stars 4.)	34	Kansas City, United States	US 10	8th	Runner-up
1	Mo Heart	34	Kansas City, United States	US All Stars 4	3rd	Runner-up
1	Baga Chipz	31	London, United Kingdom	UK 1	3rd	3rd
1	Jujubee	36	Boston, United States	US 2	3rd	3rd
1	Jujubee	36	Boston, United States	US All Stars 1	3rd	3rd
1	Jujubee	36	Boston, United States	US All Stars 5	Runner-up	3rd
1	Janey Jacké	28	Volendam, Netherlands	Holland 1	Runner-up	5th
1	Pangina Heals	32	Bangkok, Thailand	Thailand	—N/a (Note: Pangina Heals was the co-host of Drag Race Thailand and not a competitor.)	6th
1	Jimbo	37	Victoria, Canada	Canada 1	4th	7th
1	Cheryl Hole	27	Chelmsford, United Kingdom	UK 1	4th	8th
1	Lemon	25	New York City, United States	Canada 1	5th	9th
2	Tia Kofi	32	South London, United Kingdom	UK 2	7th	Winner
2	Hannah Conda	31	Sydney, Australia	Down Under 2	Runner-up	Runner-up
2	La Grande Dame	23	Nice, France	France 1	Runner-up	3rd
2	Marina Summers	26	Makati, Philippines	Philippines 1	Runner-up	3rd
2	Scarlet Envy	31	New York City, United States	US 11	10th	5th
2	Scarlet Envy	31	New York City, United States	US All Stars 6	9th	5th
2	Choriza May	31	Newcastle upon Tyne, United Kingdom	UK 3	6th	6th
2	Gothy Kendoll	25	Leicester, United Kingdom	UK 1	10th	7th
2	Keta Minaj	42	Amsterdam, Netherlands	Holland 2	4th	8th
2	Jonbers Blonde	33	Belfast, United Kingdom	UK 4	3rd	9th
2	Arantxa Castilla-La Mancha	25	Madrid, Spain	España 1	7th	10th
2	Mayhem Miller	41	Riverside, United States	US 10	10th	11th
2	Mayhem Miller	41	Riverside, United States	US All Stars 5	7th	11th
3	Gawdland	23	Chiang Mai, Thailand	Thailand 3	3rd	Winner
3	Kate Butch	29	Buxton, United Kingdom	UK 5	5th	Runner-up
3	Fontana	32	São Leopoldo, Brazil	Sverige 1	Runner-up	3rd
3	Mariah Balenciaga (Note: Mariah Paris Balenciaga is referred to as Mariah Balenciaga on the series.)	43	Los Angeles, United States	US 3	9th	3rd
3	Mariah Balenciaga	43	Los Angeles, United States	US All Stars 5	8th	3rd
3	The Only Naomy	25	Cologne, Germany	Germany 1	10th	5th
3	Zahirah Zapanta	29	Nottingham, United Kingdom	UK 6	10th	6th
3	Serena Morena	37	Aguascalientes, Mexico	México 1	8th	7th
3	Sminty Drop	26	Clitheroe, United Kingdom	UK 4	9th	8th
3	Minty Fresh	35	Quezon City, Philippines	Philippines 1	5th	9th
3	Melinda Verga	47	Edmonton, Canada	Canada 4	5th	10th

=== The Switch Drag Race ===
The Switch Drag Race premiered in 2015. The first season featured competitors from Argentina, Chile, and Uruguay. The second featured competitors from Argentina, Brazil, Chile, France, Mexico, Spain, and the United States. It has crowned two winners: Luz Violeta and Miss Leona.

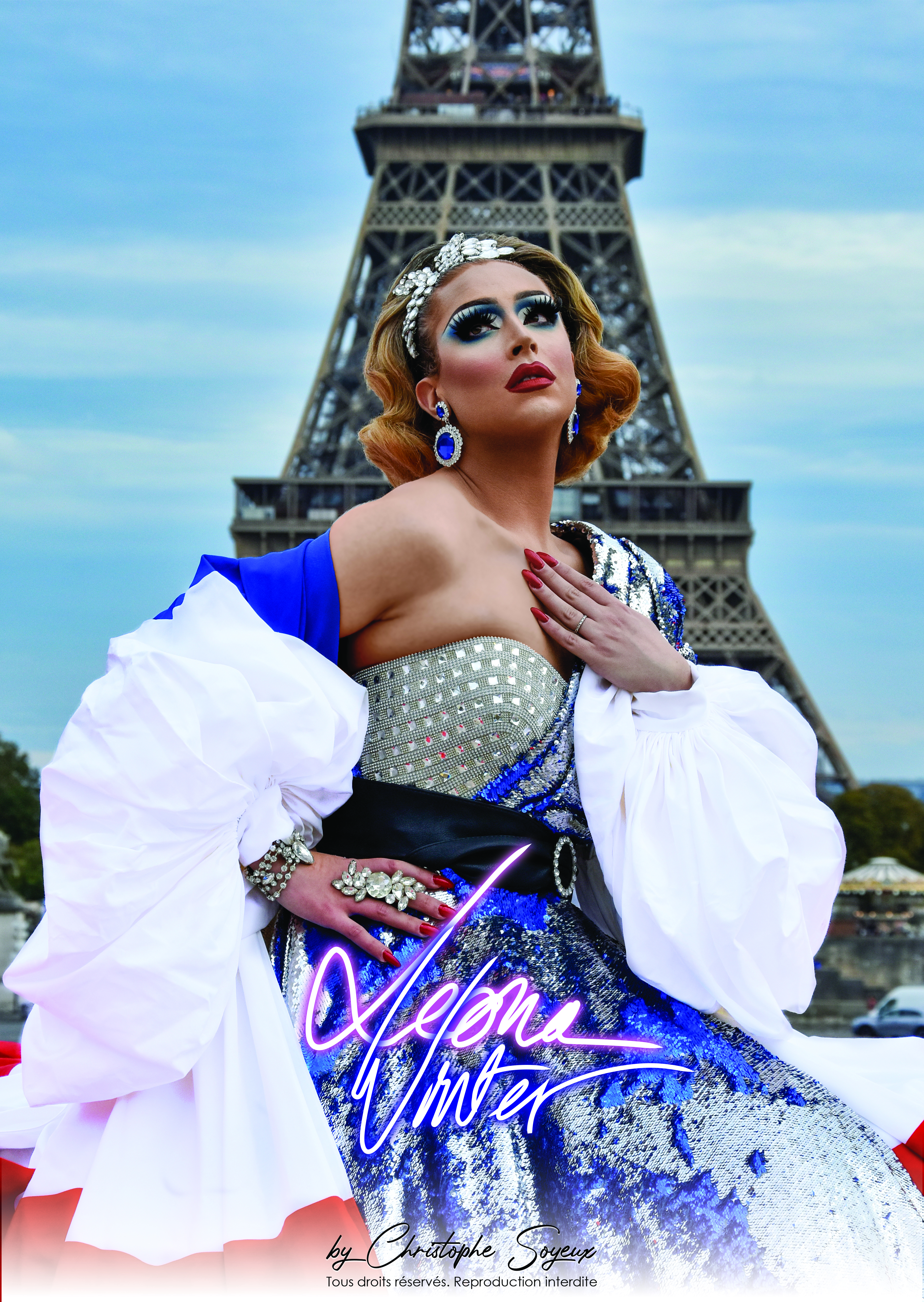
Season 2 winner
Miss Leona

Contestants of The Switch Drag Race and their backgrounds
Season	Contestant	Age	Hometown	Outcome
1	Luz Violeta	28	Santiago, Santiago, Chile	Winner
1	Luna di Mauri	48	Santiago, Santiago, Chile	Runner-up
1	Stephanie Fox	33	Antofagasta, Antofagasta, Chile	Runner-up
1	Sofía Camará	25	Entre Ríos, Entre Ríos, Argentina	4th (Note: Sofía Camará originally placed sixteenth before re-entering the competition.)
1	Yoyi	41	Santiago, Santiago, Chile	5th
1	Rubí	28	Montevideo, Montevideo, Uruguay	6th (Note: Rubí originally placed fourteenth before re-entering the competition.)
1	Arianda Sodi	28	Santiago, Santiago, Chile	7th (Note: Arianda Sodi originally placed tenth before re-entering the competition.)
1	Laura Bell	26	Santiago, Santiago, Chile	8th (Note: Laura Bell originally placed ninth before re-entering the competition.)
1	Fernanda Brown	24	Santiago, Santiago, Chile	9th
1	Jessica Parker	24	Antofagasta, Antofagasta, Chile	10th (Note: Jessica Parker was voted Mejor Compañera.)
1	Paulette Palmery	38	Antofagasta, Antofagasta, Chile	11th
1	Nery Lefferti	24	Santiago, Santiago, Chile	12th (Note: Nery Lefferti originally placed fifteenth before re-entering the competition.)
1	Yume Hime	27	Antofagasta, Antofagasta, Chile	13th
1	Kristina Kox	22	Santiago, Santiago, Chile	14th
1	Francisca Thompson	21	Santiago, Santiago, Chile	15th
1	Elizabeth San Martín	23	Antofagasta, Antofagasta, Chile	16th (Note: Elizabeth San Martín was voted La Peor Transformista.)
1	Álvaro Lynch	50	Buenos Aires, Argentina	17th
2	Miss Leona	21	Paris, Île-de-France, France	Winner
2	Gia Gunn (Note: The contestant returned after having competed on a different franchise.)	26	Chicago, Illinois, United States (Note: Although living in Chicago at the time, Gia Gunn represented Japan on the show.)	Runner-up
2	Pavel Arámbula	32	Mexico City, Mexico	Runner-up
2	Sofía Camará (Note: The contestant returned to compete after being eliminated on a previous season.)	26	Entre Ríos, Entre Ríos, Argentina	Runner-up
2	Fernanda Brown	25	Santiago, Santiago, Chile	5th
2	Diva Houston	38	São Paulo, São Paulo, Brazil (Note: Although living in Spain at the time, Diva Houston represented Brazil on the show.)	6th (Note: Diva Houston originally placed eleventh before re-entering the competition.)
2	Rochelle Mon Chéri	25	San Juan, Puerto Rico, United States	7th (Note: Rochelle Mon Chéri originally placed ninth before re-entering the competition.)
2	Kandy Ho	30	New York City, New York, United States (Note: Although living in New York at the time, Kandy Ho represented Puerto Rico on the show.)	8th
2	Luz Violeta (Note: Luz Violeta returned to compete after winning the previous season.)	29	Santiago, Santiago, Chile	9th
2	Arianda Sodi	29	Santiago, Santiago, Chile	10th (Note: Arianda Sodi originally placed thirteenth before re-entering the competition.)
2	Laura Bell	27	Santiago, Santiago, Chile	11th
2	Marie Laveau	25	San Juan, Puerto Rico, United States	12th
2	Luna di Mauri	49	Santiago, Santiago, Chile	13th
2	Francisca del Solar	28	Santiago, Santiago, Chile	14th
2	Franciska Tólika	24	Seville, Seville, Spain	15th

== See also ==
- List of drag queens
