= Barbie Q (drag queen) =

German drag performer

Barbie Q is the stage name of Nicolás Mateo Aguirre Ossio, a Bolivian-born German drag performer who competed on Drag Race Germany and Drag Race México: Latina Royale. She is based in Munich.

== Filmography ==
- Drag Race Germany
- Drag Race México: Latina Royale

== See also ==
- List of drag queens
