= RuPaul's Secret Celebrity Drag Race season 1 =

2020 season of the television series

RuPaul's Secret Celebrity Drag Race
- Season 1
- Promotional poster for season one
- Hosted by: RuPaul
- Judges: RuPaul; Michelle Visage; Carson Kressley; Ross Mathews
- No. of contestants: 12
- No. of episodes: 4

Release
- Original network: VH1
- Original release: April 24 – May 15, 2020

Season chronology
- Next → Season 2

The first season of RuPaul's Secret Celebrity Drag Race premiered Friday, April 24, 2020, on VH1 (US). The four-part event series judging panel include RuPaul, Michelle Visage, Carson Kressley and Ross Mathews. The secret celebrities underwent a drag transformation and were mentored by Drag Race Royalty as "Queens Supremes".

This season resembles that of the main series - with each episode consisting of a mini-challenge (the winner of which earns an advantage in the maxi challenge), the maxi challenge and a lip-sync (which determines who is the winner of the week).

== Contestants ==
Contestants of RuPaul's Secret Celebrity Drag Race season 1 and their charity donations
| Episode | Drag Name | Celebrity | Queen Supreme | Outcome | Raised | Charity |
|---|---|---|---|---|---|---|
| 1 | Babykins La Roux | Jordan Connor | Trixie Mattel | Winner | $30,000 | Cystic Fibrosis Canada |
| 1 | Miss Mimi Teapot | Jermaine Fowler | Bob the Drag Queen | Runners-up | $10,000 | RAINN |
| 1 | Olivette Isyou | Nico Tortorella | Monét X Change | Runners-up | $10,000 | Transgender Law Center |
| 2 | Vanqueisha De House | Vanessa Williams | Asia O'Hara | Winner | $30,000 | The Trevor Project |
| 2 | Mary J. Ross | Loni Love | Trinity the Tuck | Runners-up | $10,000 | Dress for Success |
| 2 | Miss Shenita Cocktail | Tami Roman | Alyssa Edwards | Runners-up | $10,000 | St. Jude Children's Research Hospital |
| 3 | Bette Bordeaux | Matt Iseman | Kim Chi | Winners | $20,000 | Arthritis Foundation |
| 3 | Madam That Bitch | Alex Newell | Bob the Drag Queen | Winners | $20,000 | Hetrick-Martin Institute |
| 3 | Rachel McAdamsapple | Dustin Milligan | Nina West | Winners | $20,000 | Project HEAL |
| 4 | Queen Eleza Beth | Hayley Kiyoko | Vanessa Vanjie Mateo | Winner | $30,000 | Planned Parenthood |
| 4 | Coral Fixation | Madison Beer | Monique Heart | Runners-up | $10,000 | The Trevor Project |
| 4 | Cocotini | Phoebe Robinson | Alyssa Edwards | Runners-up | $10,000 | Product Red |

=== Special guests ===
Episode 2

- Dolly Parton, singer

Episode 3

- Love Connie, drag performer

Behind the scenes make-up artists

- Shannel, contestant on season 1 and All Stars 1
- Laila McQueen, contestant on season 8
- Mayhem Miller, contestant on season 10

== Contestant progress ==
Legend:

WIN (Winner) indicates that the contestant won the episode of RuPaul's Secret Celebrity Drag Race season 1.
RU (Runner-up) indicates that the contestant was the runner-up.

Contestants progress with placements in each episode
| Drag Name | Celebrity | Episode | | | |
| Drag Name | Celebrity | 1 | 2 | 3 | 4 |
|---|---|---|---|---|---|
| Babykins La Roux | Jordan Connor | WIN | | | |
| Miss Mimi Teapot | Jermaine Fowler | RU | | | |
| Olivette Isyou | Nico Tortorella | RU | | | |
| Vanqueisha De House | Vanessa Williams | | WIN | | |
| Mary J. Ross | Loni Love | | RU | | |
| Miss Shenita Cocktail | Tami Roman | | RU | | |
| Bette Bordeaux | Matt Iseman | | | WIN | |
| Madam That Bitch | Alex Newell | | | WIN | |
| Rachel McAdamsapple | Dustin Milligan | | | WIN | |
| Queen Eleza Beth | Hayley Kiyoko | | | | WIN |
| Coral Fixation | Madison Beer | | | | RU |
| Cocotini | Phoebe Robinson | | | | RU |

== Lip syncs ==
Legend:

The contestant won the Lip Sync for the Crown and was declared the winner of the episode.

| Episode | Contestants | Song | Winner(s) |
|---|---|---|---|
| 1 | Babykins La Roux vs. Miss Mimi Teapot vs. Olivette Isyou | "Express Yourself" (Madonna) | Babykins La Roux |
| 2 | Mary J. Ross vs. Miss Shenita Cocktail vs. Vanqueisha De House | "You Make Me Feel (Mighty Real)" (Sylvester) | Vanqueisha De House |
| 3 | Bette Bordeaux vs. Madam That Bitch vs. Rachel McAdamsapple | "It's All Coming Back to Me Now" (Celine Dion) | Bette Bordeaux |
| 3 | Bette Bordeaux vs. Madam That Bitch vs. Rachel McAdamsapple | "It's All Coming Back to Me Now" (Celine Dion) | Madam That Bitch |
| 3 | Bette Bordeaux vs. Madam That Bitch vs. Rachel McAdamsapple | "It's All Coming Back to Me Now" (Celine Dion) | Rachel McAdamsapple |
| 4 | Cocotini vs. Coral Fixation vs. Queen Eleza Beth | "California Gurls" (Katy Perry) | Queen Eleza Beth |

== Episodes ==
RuPaul's Secret Celebrity Drag Race episodes
| No. overall | No. in season | Title | Original release date |
|---|---|---|---|
| 1 | 1 | "Secret Celebrity Edition #101" | April 24, 2020 |
| 2 | 2 | "Secret Celebrity Edition #102" | May 1, 2020 |
| 3 | 3 | "Secret Celebrity Edition #103" | May 8, 2020 |
| 4 | 4 | "Secret Celebrity Edition #104" | May 15, 2020 |

== Ratings ==
Viewership and ratings per episode of RuPaul's Secret Celebrity Drag Race season 1
| No. | Title | Air date | Rating/share (18–49) | Viewers (millions) |
|---|---|---|---|---|
| 1 | "Secret Celebrity Edition #101" | April 24, 2020 | 0.31 | 0.685 |
| 2 | "Secret Celebrity Edition #102" | May 1, 2020 | 0.23 | 0.551 |
| 3 | "Secret Celebrity Edition #103" | May 8, 2020 | 0.16 | 0.426 |
| 4 | "Secret Celebrity Edition #104" | May 15, 2020 | 0.19 | 0.478 |
