= Magnetica (drag queen) =

French drag performer

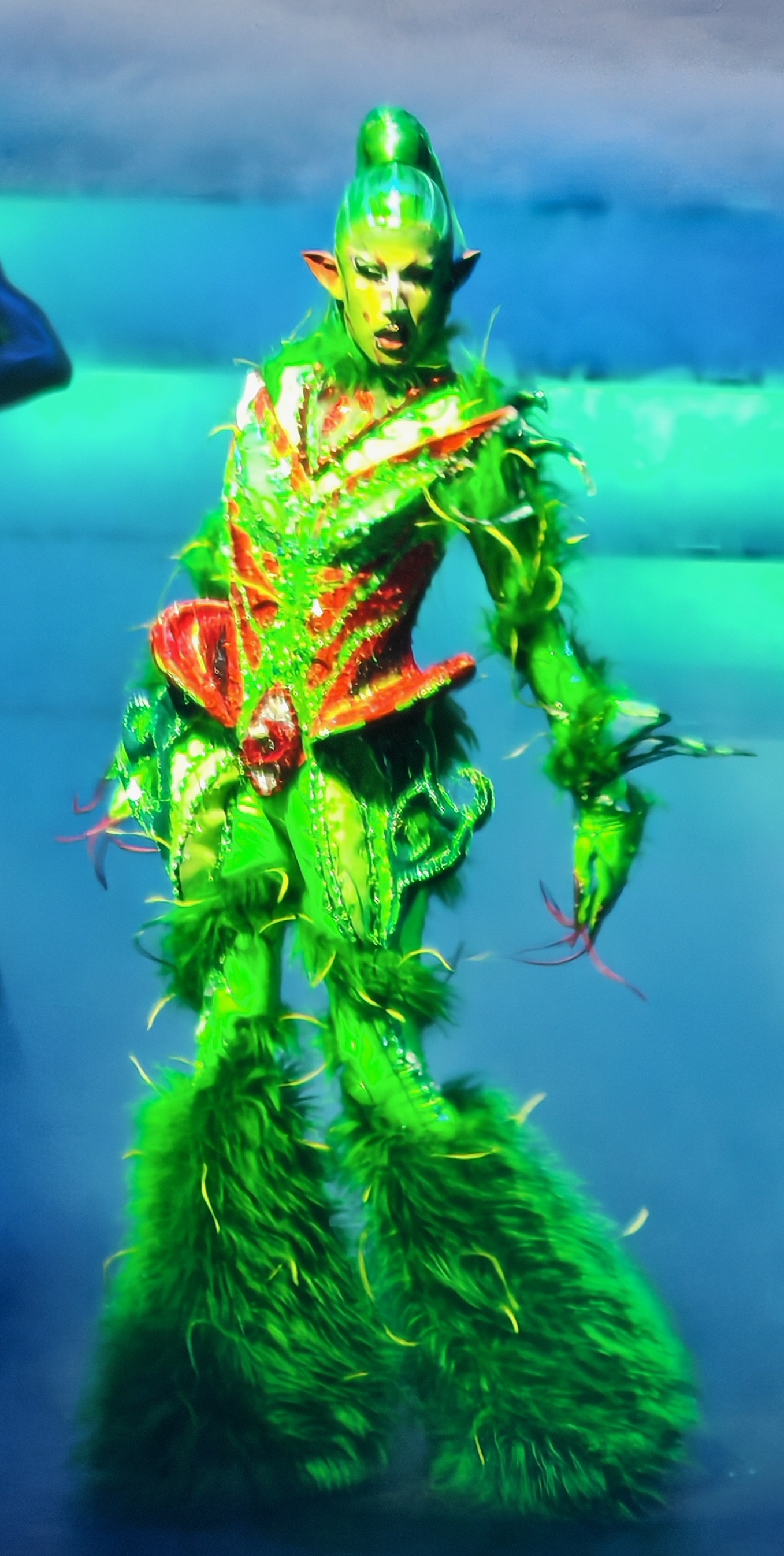
- Magnetica in 2025
- Born: Alejandro Sauniere; 1999 or 2000 (age 26–27); Bolivia
- Occupation: Drag performer
- Years active: 2022–
- Known for: Drag Race France; Drag Race France All Stars

Magnetica is the stage name of Alejandro Sauniere (born 1999 or 2000), a Bolivian-born French drag performer who competed on the third season of Drag Race France and the first season of Drag Race France All Stars.

== Early life ==
Alejandro Sauniere was born in Bolivia and discovered drag in high school while watching RuPaul's Drag Race on her school library's computers with a friend.

== Career ==
Magnetica began drag in 2022. She competed on the third season of Drag Race France in 2024. She placed ninth overall. She also competed on Drag Race France All Stars in 2025. She was the first contestant to be eliminated from the competition.

== Personal life ==
Magnetica is transgender and non-binary.
