= Miss Abby OMG =

Brazilian-born Dutch drag performer

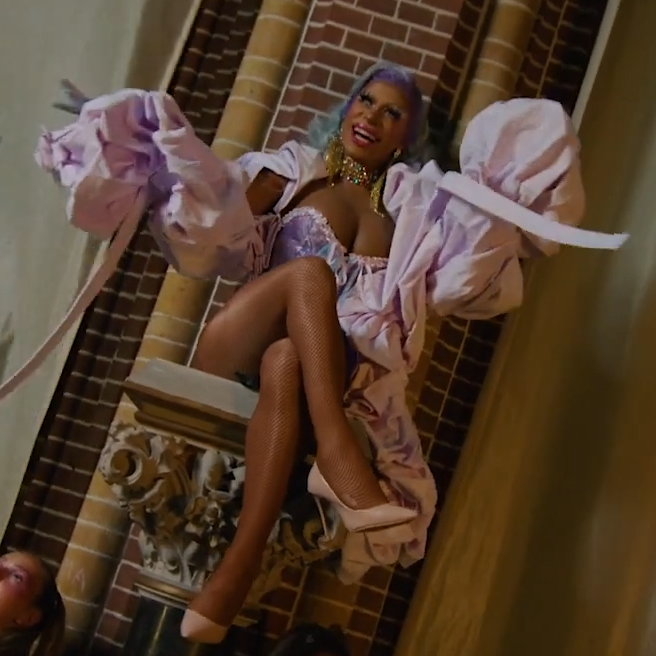
Miss Abby OMG in 2022

Miss Abby OMG is the stage name of Henrique dos Santos, a Brazilian-born Dutch drag performer who competed on the first season of Drag Race Holland and Drag Race México: Latina Royale.
