= Snatch Game =

Recurring challenge within the Drag Race franchise

The Snatch Game as seen in season 10 of RuPaul's Drag Race

Snatch Game is a comedy challenge recurring across the Drag Race television franchise and a fixture of the reality competition series. Since the second season of the original American RuPaul's Drag Race series in 2010, the challenge has returned for every subsequent season. Typically arranged as a parody of Match Game (known as Blankety Blank in the UK, Blankety Blanks in Australia, and Jogo dos Pontinhos in Brazil), the challenge is a test of the contestants' skills at celebrity impersonation and improvisational comedy.

The challenge similarly recurs on various spin-offs, including All Stars and Secret Celebrity Drag Race, as well as the international adaptations for Thai, British, Canadian, Dutch, Australian-New Zealand, Spanish, Italian, French, Philippine, Belgian, Swedish, Mexican, Brazilian, and German audiences.

Usually occurring midway through each Drag Race season, Snatch Game is widely considered among the most important and memorable challenges of the show and, in RuPaul's own words, separates "the basic bitches from the fierce-ass queens." Winners of the show are often amongst the top performers in the Snatch Game, (Note: In all the seasons to include the Snatch Game, these queens (Jinkx Monsoon [twice], Bob the Drag Queen, Aquaria, Alaska, Trinity the Tuck, Shea Couleé, Natalia Pliacam, The Vivienne, Envy Peru, Sharonne, Blu Hydrangea, Gisèle Lullaby, La Diamond, Ra'Jah O'Hara, Admira Thunderpussy, Jimbo, Cristian Peralta, Captivating Katkat, Ginger Johnson, and Ginger Minj) who won the Snatch Game went on to win their seasons.) though there are a few exceptions. (Note: In all the seasons to include Snatch Game, only five queens (Yvie Oddly, Willow Pill, Trixie Mattel, Priyanka, and Lawrence Chaney) who placed in the bottom for the Snatch Game went on to win their seasons.)

The drag queen contestants typically impersonate women, though several contestants choose male celebrities with sufficiently flamboyant public images to fit a drag aesthetic. Several contestants have chosen to impersonate other people directly associated with the show, such as other past or present contestants, Michelle Visage, or RuPaul. Queens cannot choose copyrighted characters, although some celebrity portrayals have been closely based on a specific screen performance.

The challenge often relies on special celebrity guests to participate in game play, who frequently double as the episode's guest judges. Other seasons feature the show's regular production team—Michelle Visage, Ross Mathews, Carson Kressley, Rhys Nicholson, or members of the Pit Crew—in lieu of outside guests.

Ginger Minj has won Snatch Game three times, the most of any queen in the franchise. Eight other queens have won Snatch Game twice: BenDeLaCreme, Baga Chipz, Jinkx Monsoon, Trinity the Tuck, Jimbo, Hannah Conda, Gottmik and Punani. Three queens have been eliminated twice for their Snatch Game performances: Gia Gunn, Onyx Unleashed and Cynthia Lee Fontaine.

== United States ==
Legend:

WIN indicates that the contestant won the challenge and, for the All Stars format, the Lip Sync for Your Legacy too.
TOP2 indicates that the contestant won the challenge, but lost the Lip Sync for Your Legacy.
Win (Winner) indicates that the contestant won the challenge and the Lip Sync for the Crown.
R-up (Runner-up) indicates that the contestant was the runner-up.
SAFE indicates that the contestant was declared safe by the judges.
BLK (Blocked) indicates that the contestant was blocked by the lip sync winner from earning a Legendary Legend Star.
BTM (Bottom) indicates that the contestant was up for elimination
ELIM (Eliminated) indicates that the contestant was eliminated.

=== RuPaul's Drag Race ===
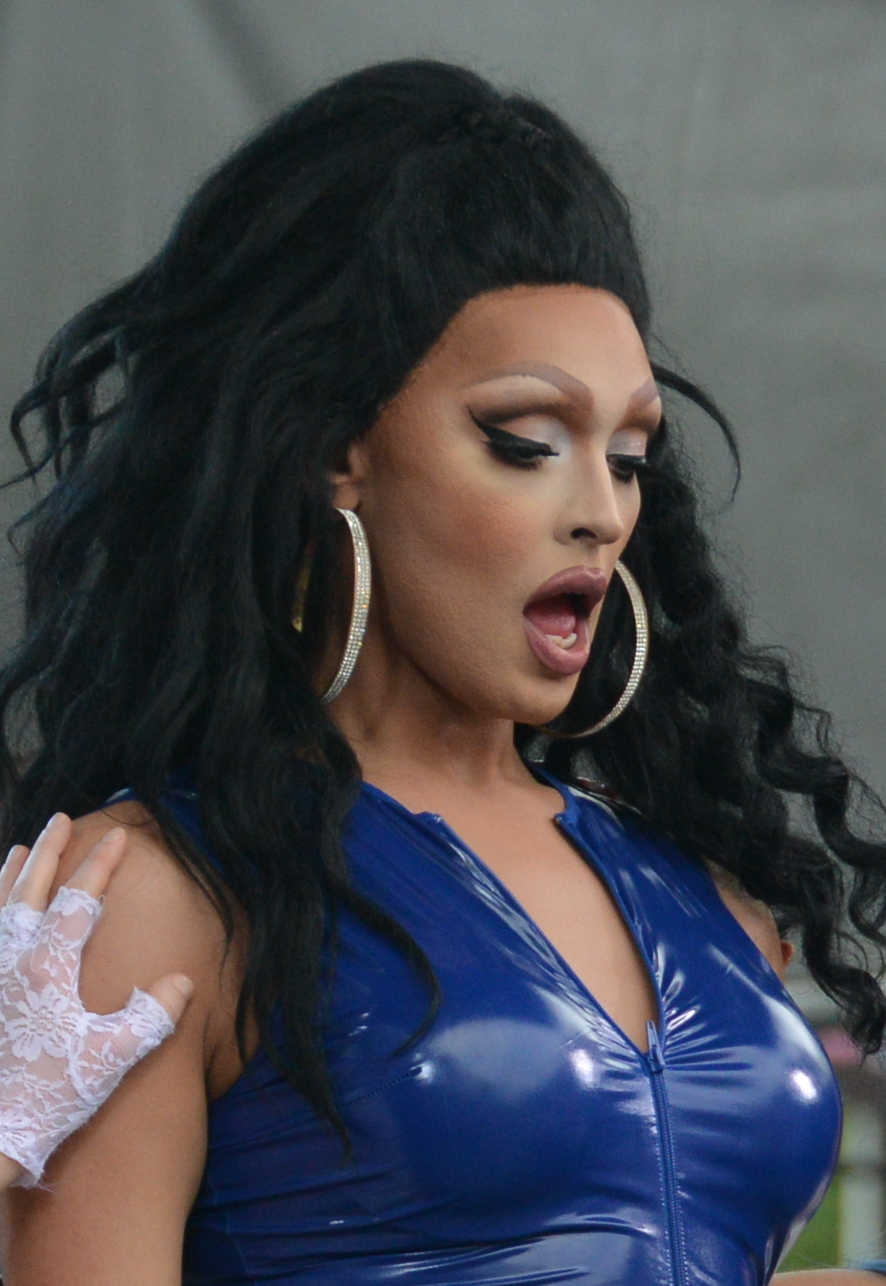
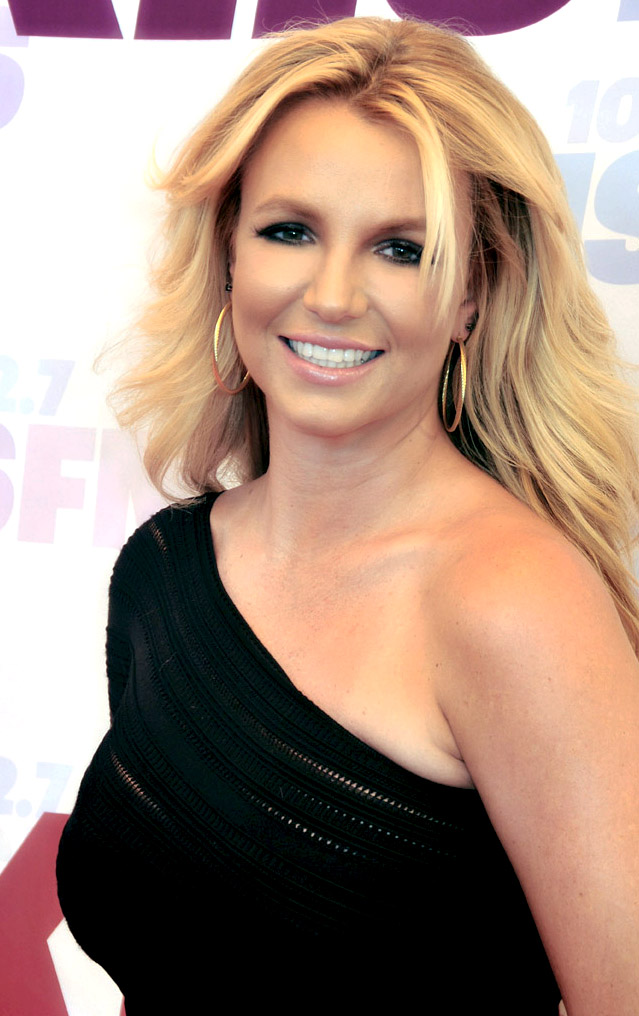
Tatianna (left) won on season 2 for her portrayal of Britney Spears (right).
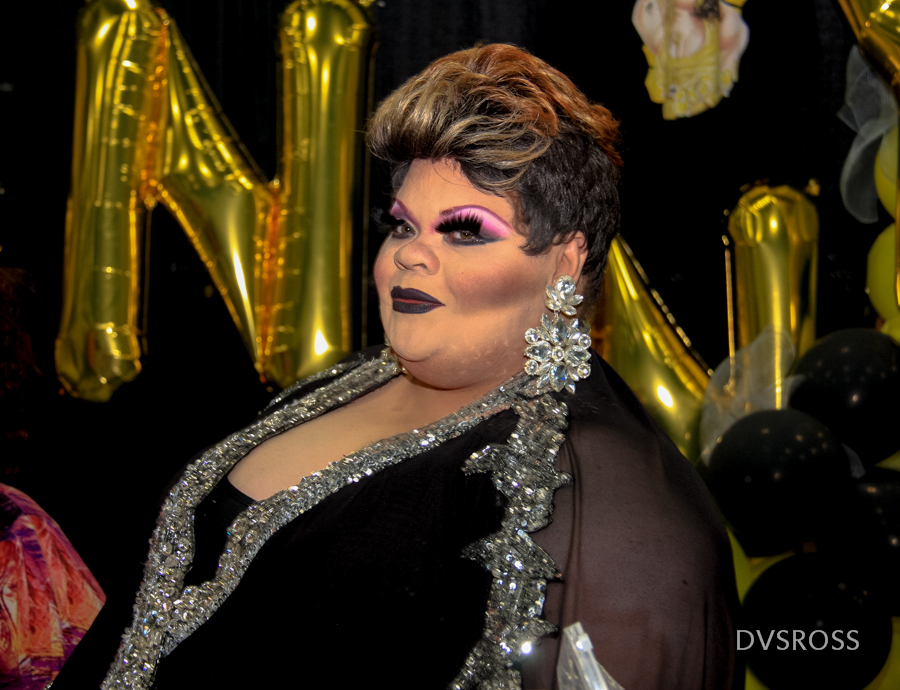
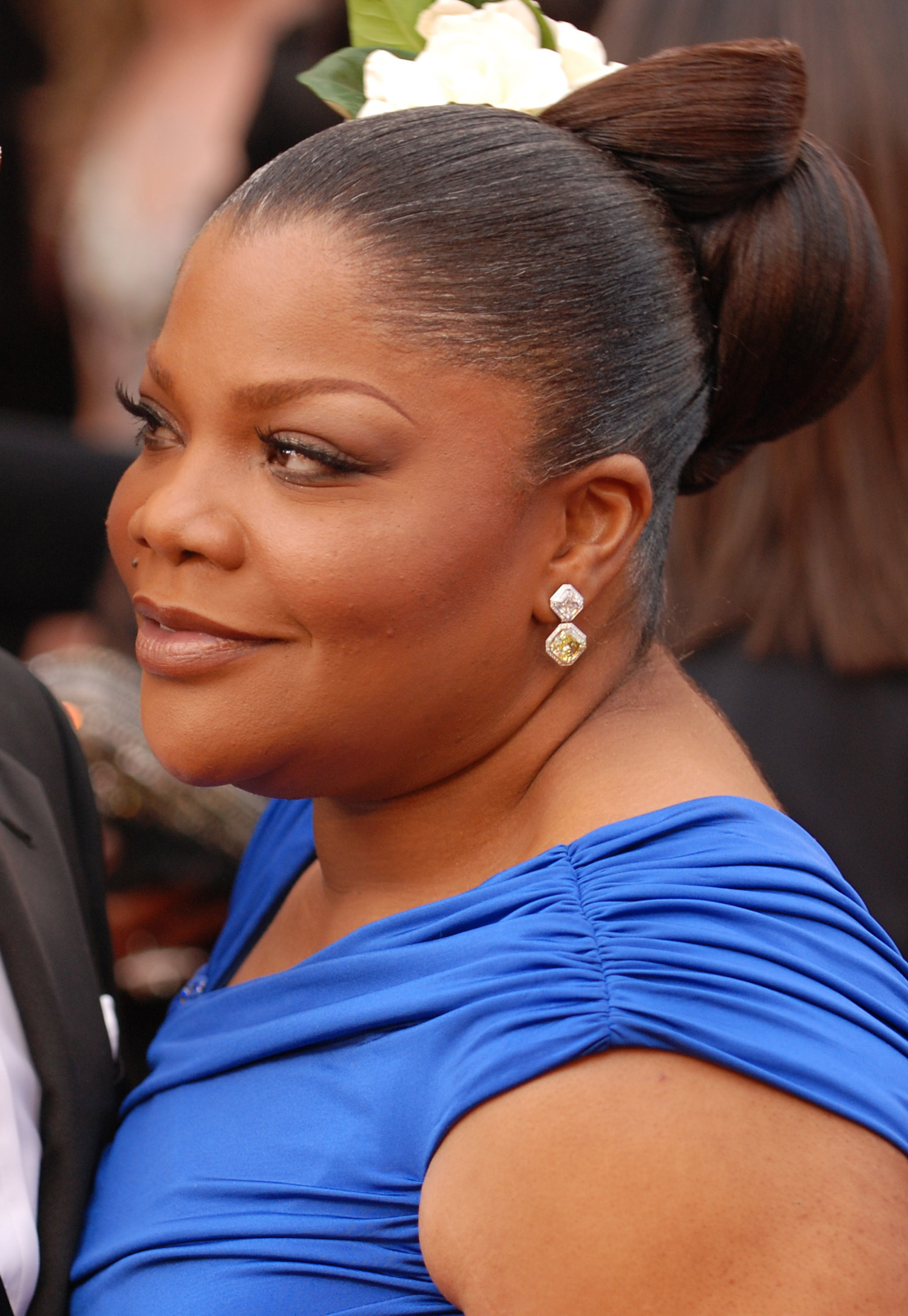
Stacy Layne Matthews (left) won on season 3 for her portrayal of Mo'Nique (right).
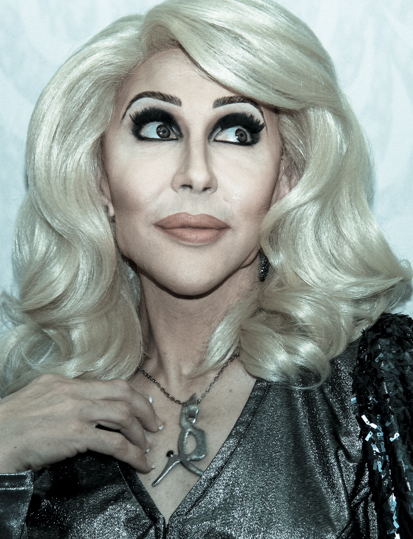
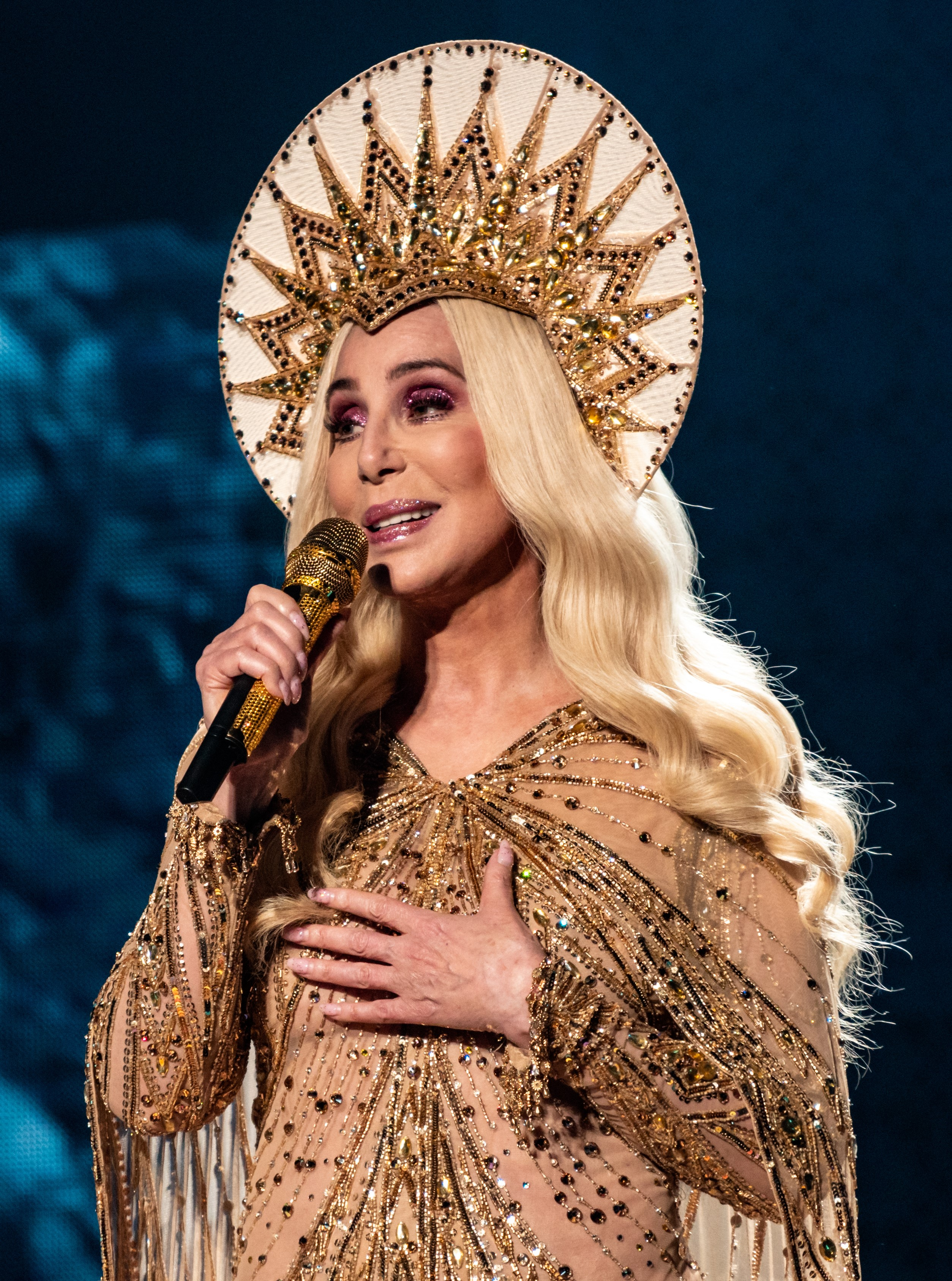
Chad Michaels (left) won on season 4 for his portrayal of Cher (right).
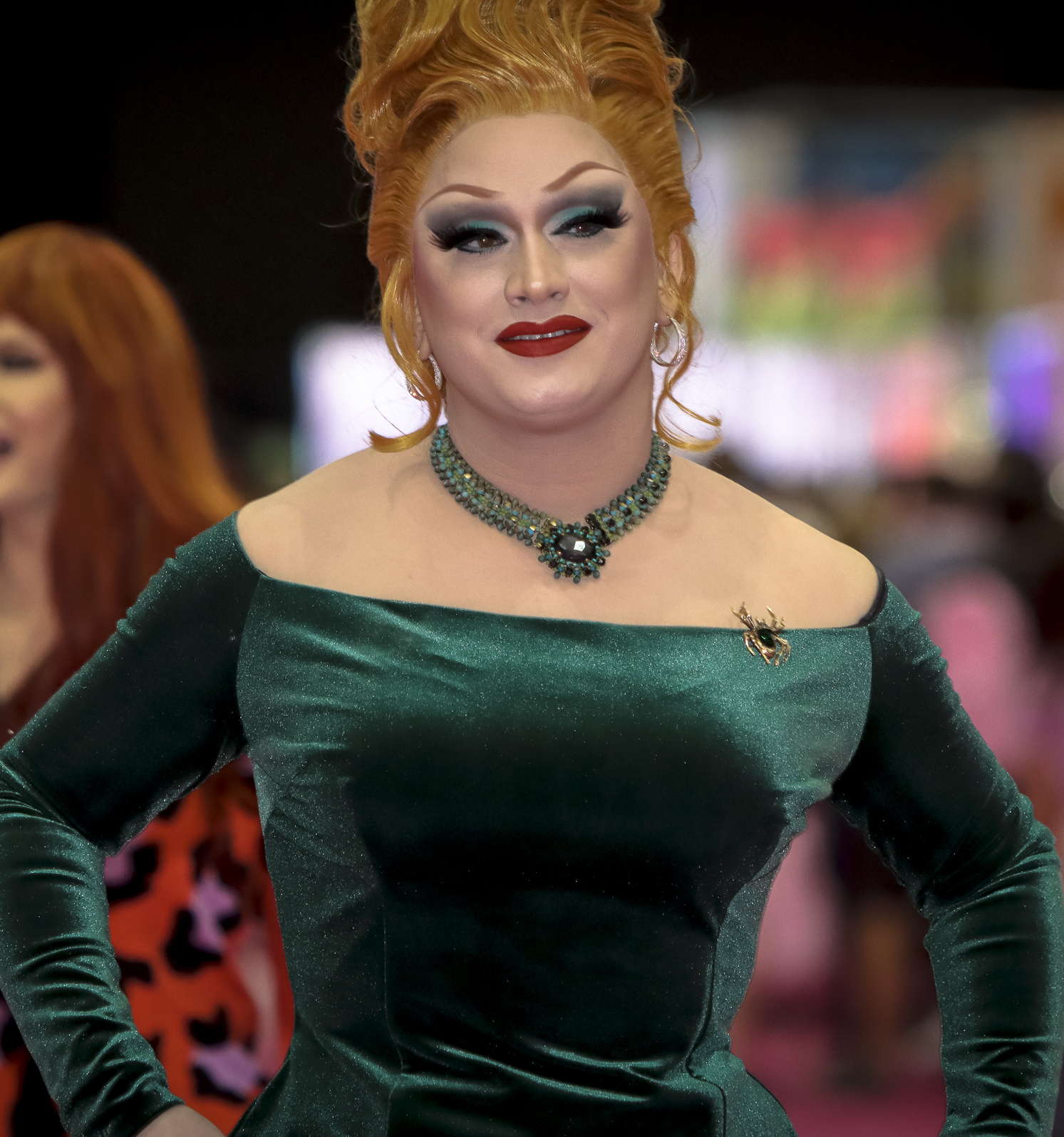
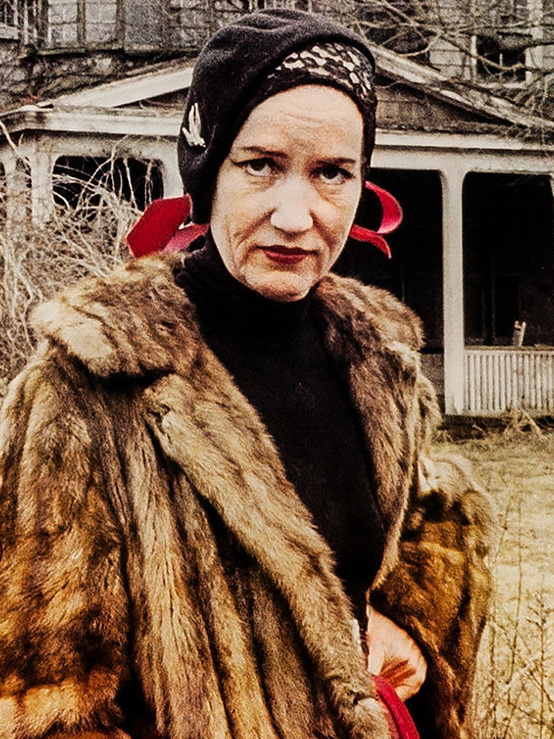
Jinkx Monsoon (left) won on season 5 for her portrayal of Edith "Little Edie" Bouvier Beale (right).
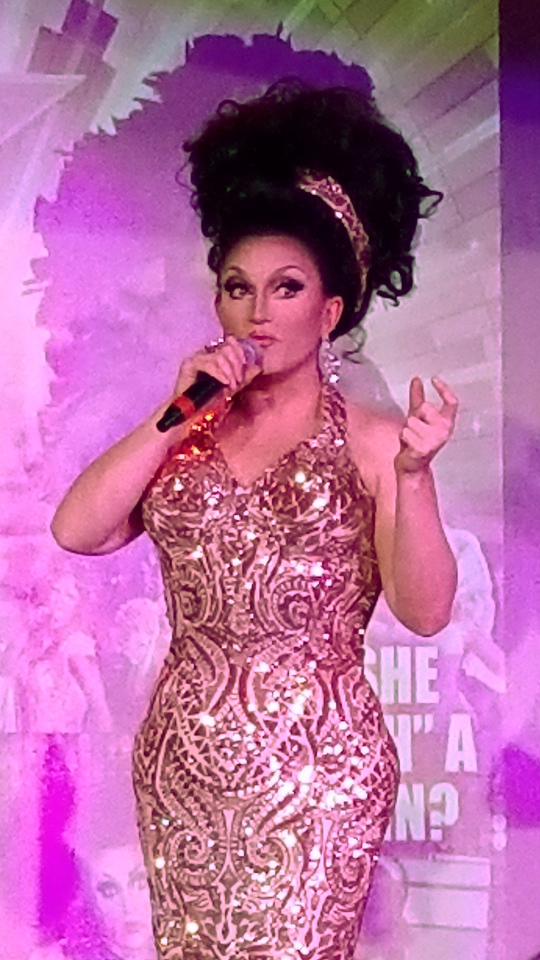
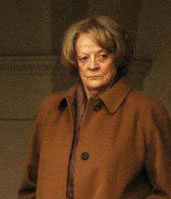
BenDeLaCreme (left) won on season 6 for her portrayal of Maggie Smith (right).
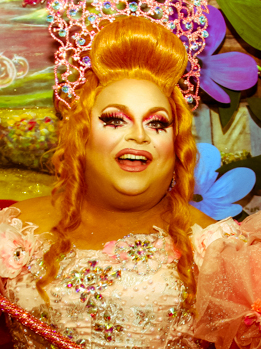
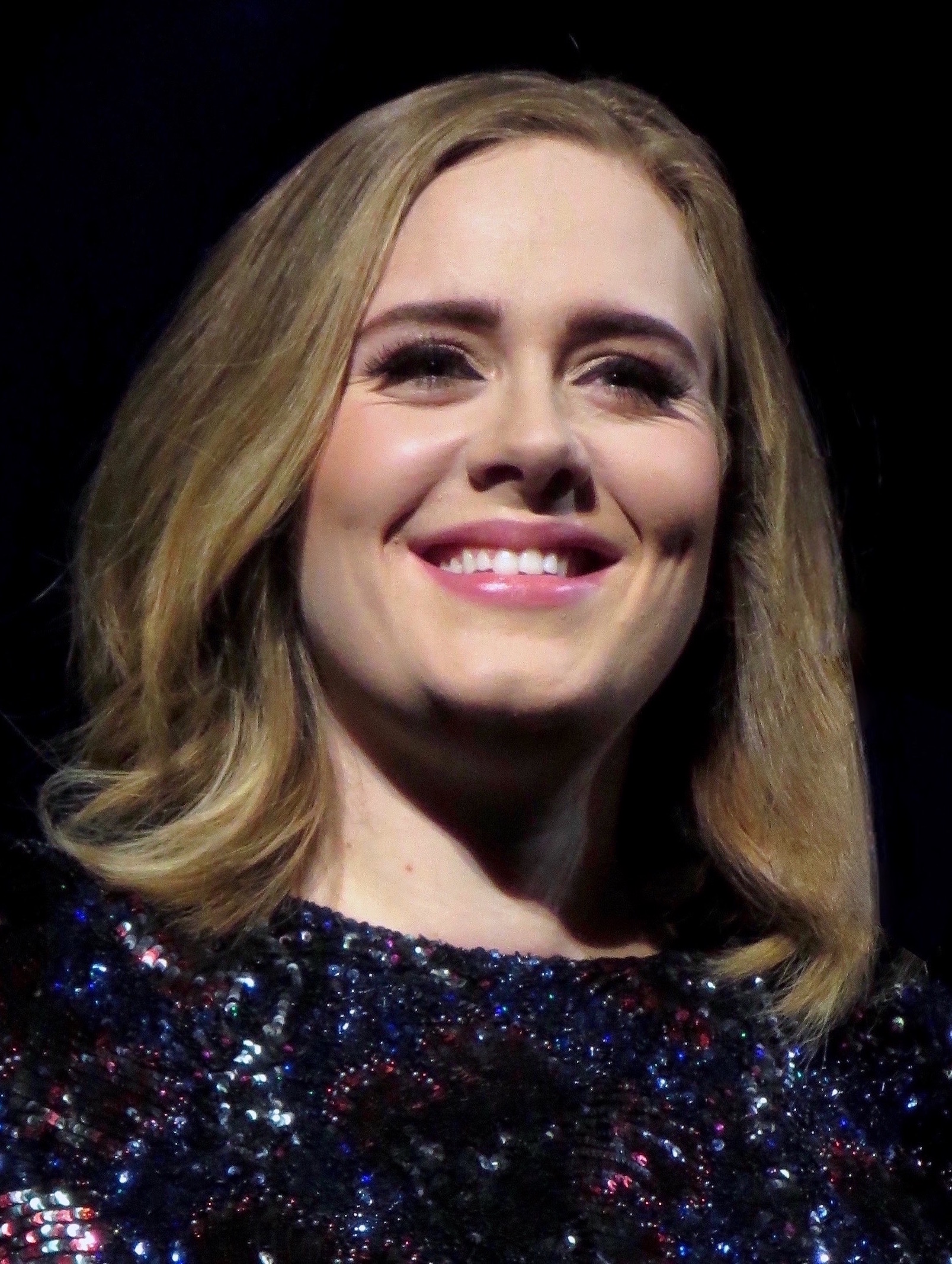
Ginger Minj (left) won on season 7 for her portrayal of Adele (right).
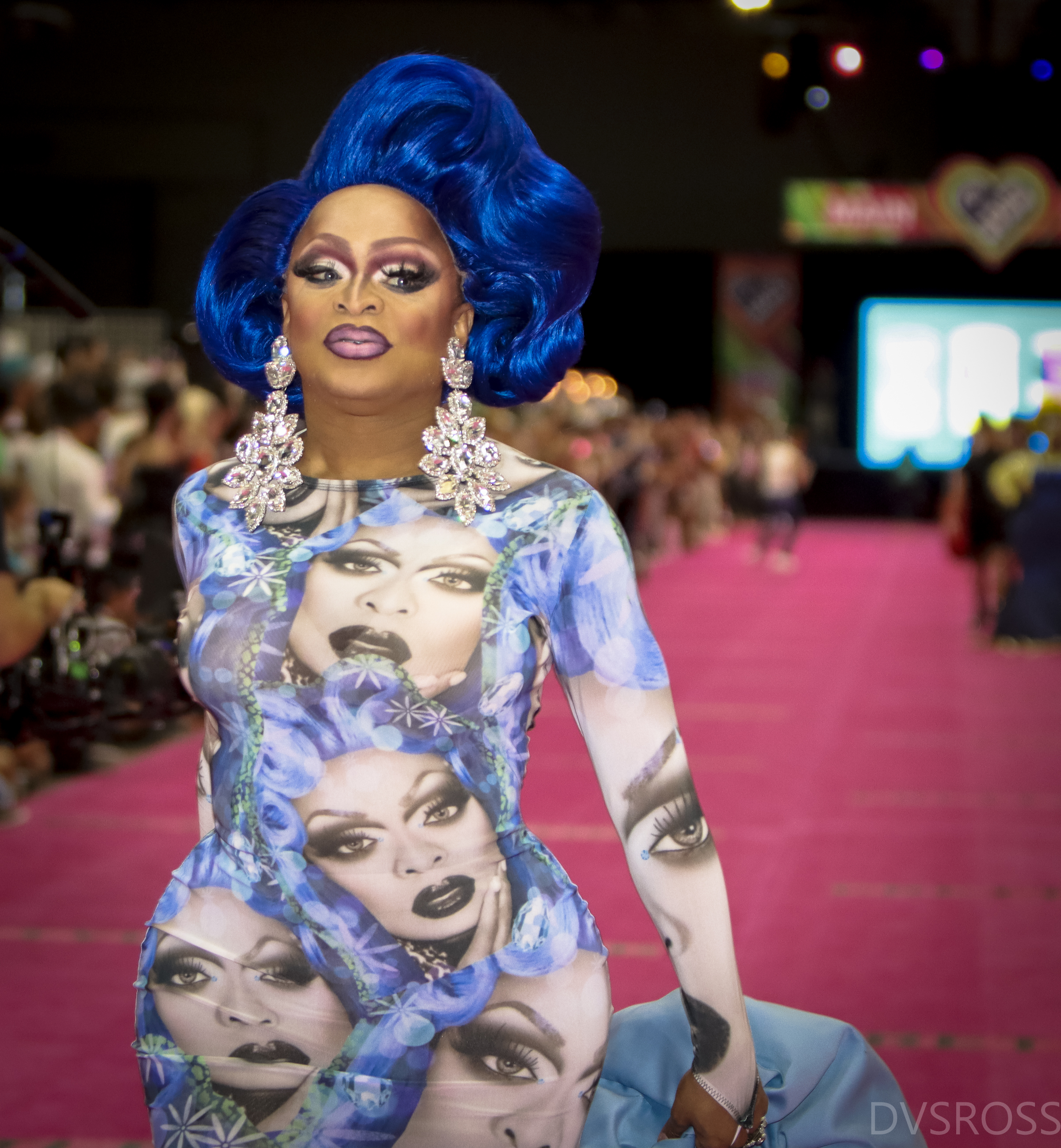
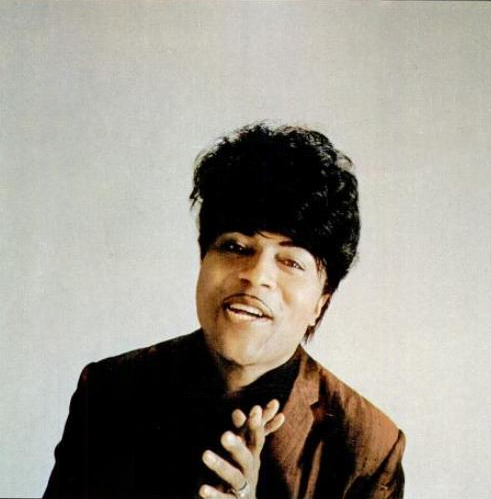
Kennedy Davenport (left) also won on season 7 for her portrayal of Little Richard (right).
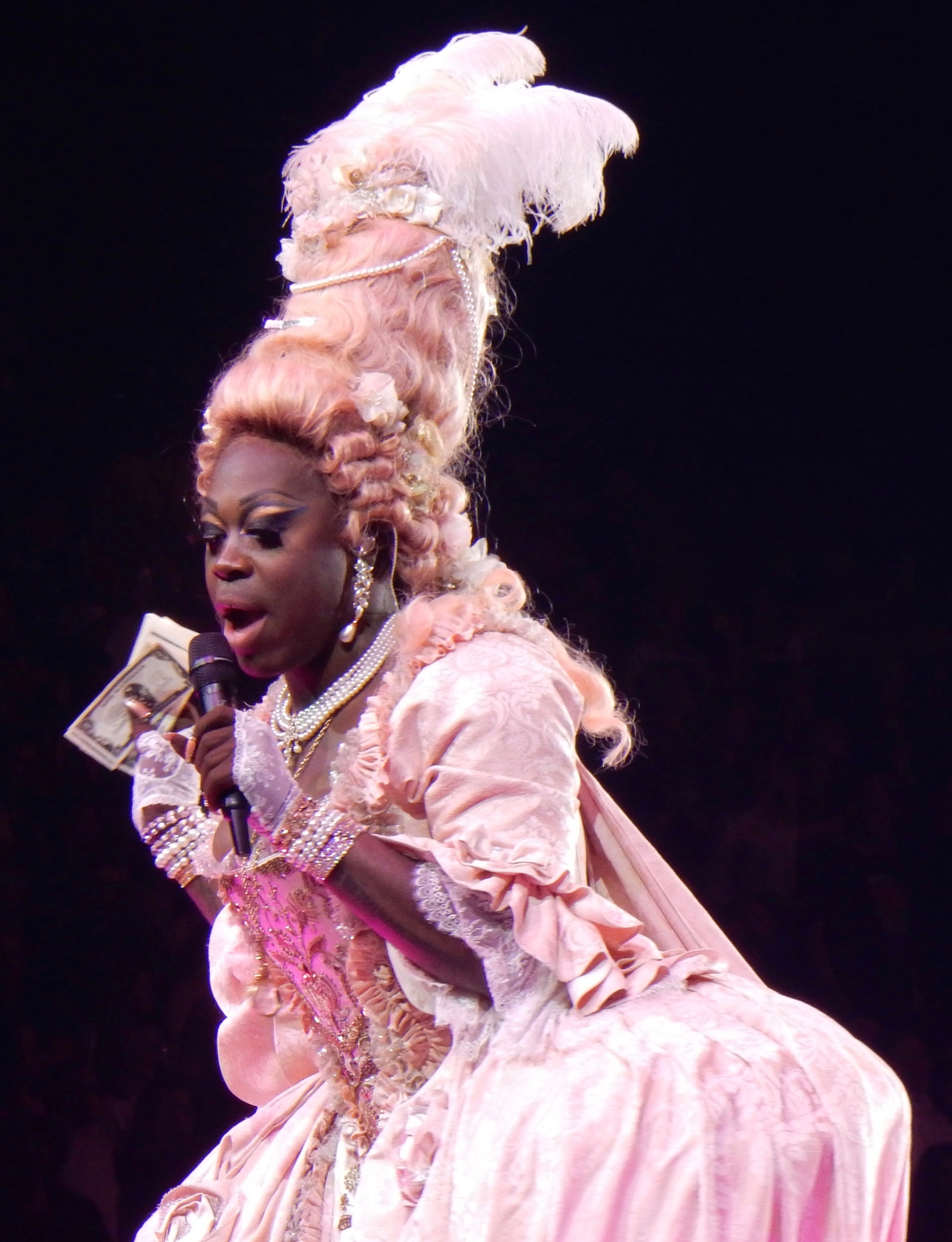
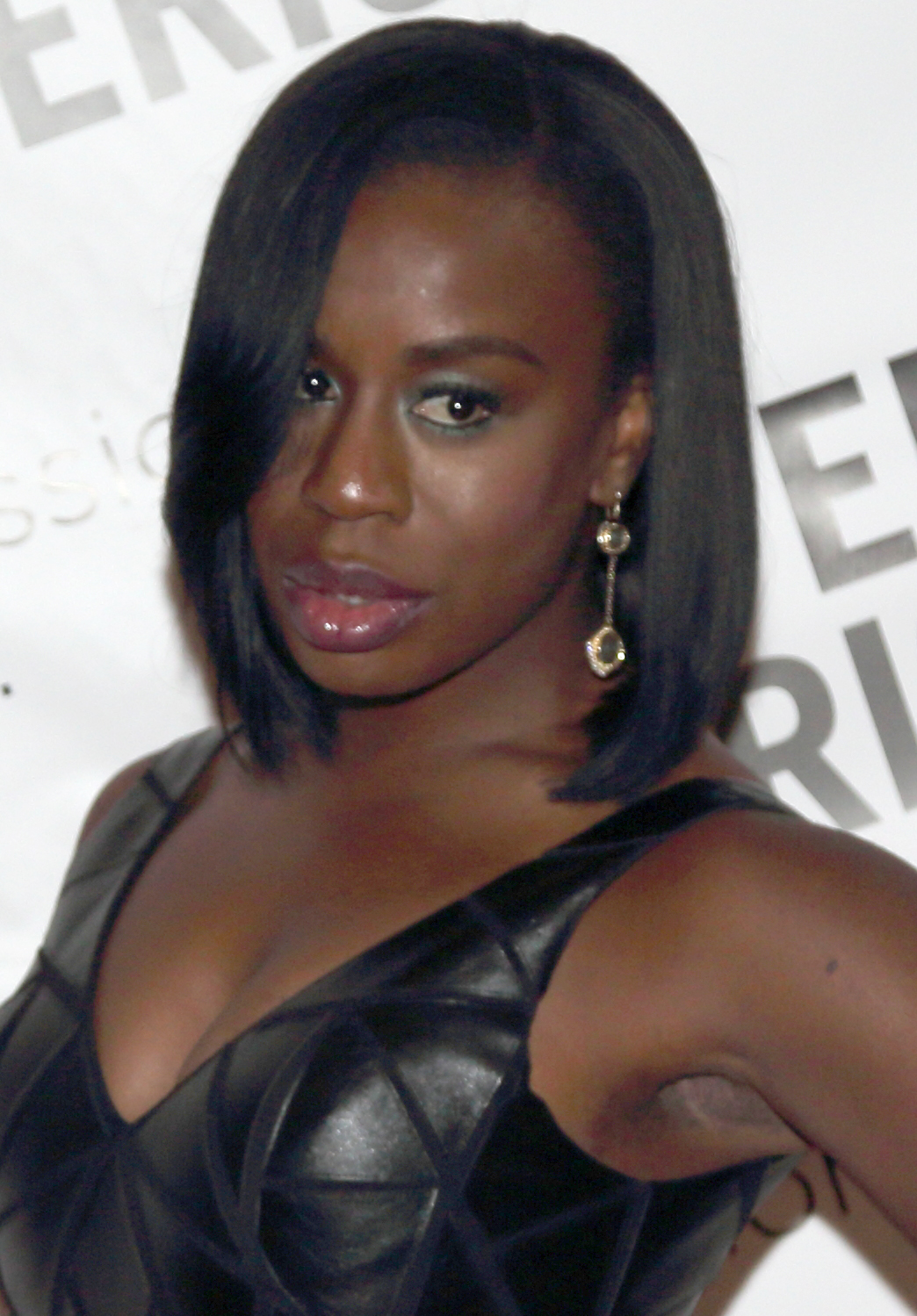
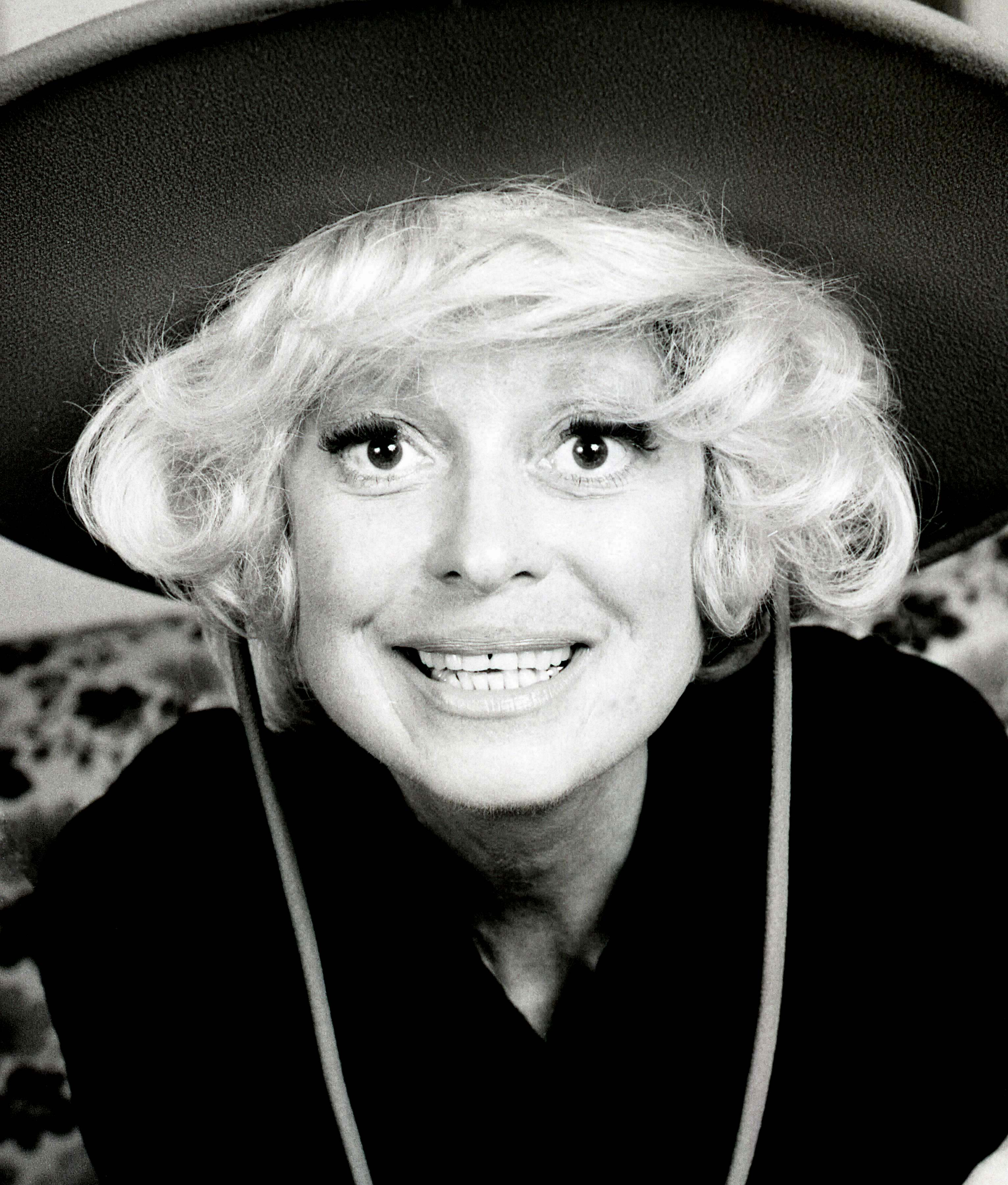
Bob the Drag Queen (left) won on season 8 for her portrayals of Uzo Aduba (middle) and Carol Channing (right).
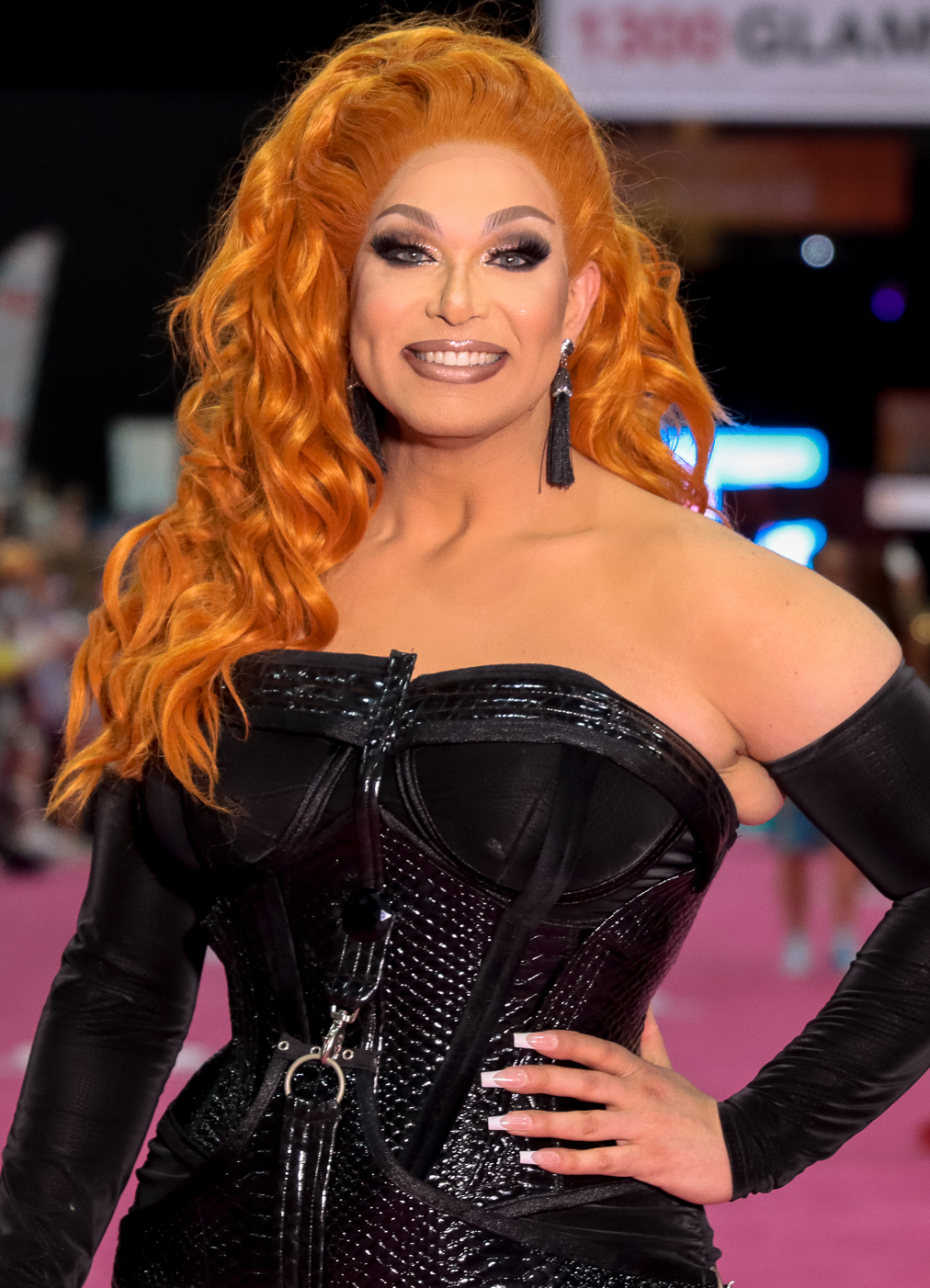
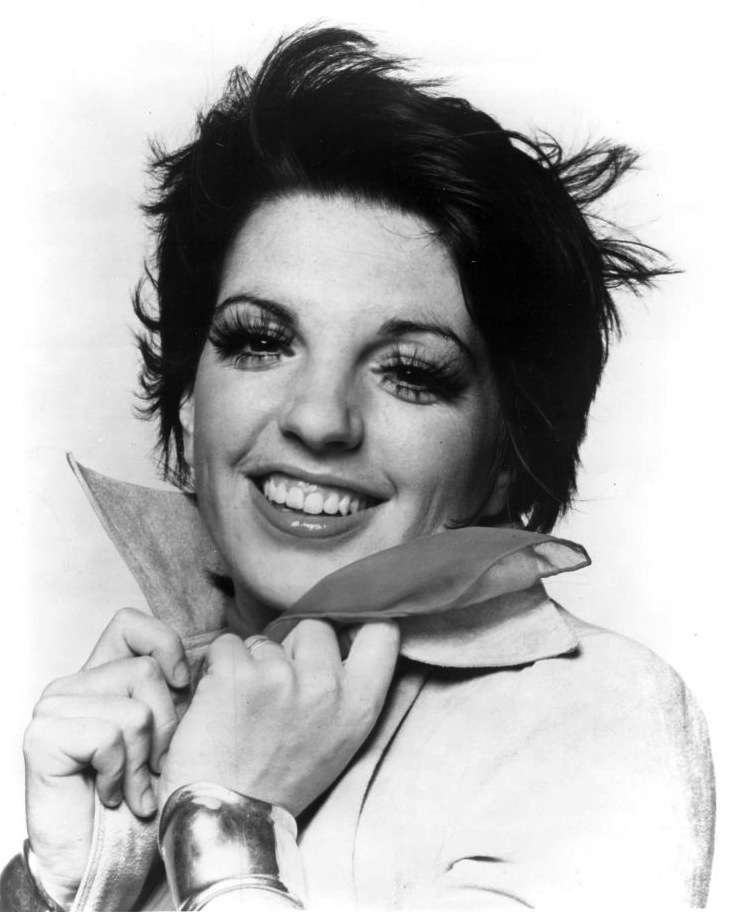
Alexis Michelle (left) won on season 9 for her portrayal of Liza Minnelli (right).
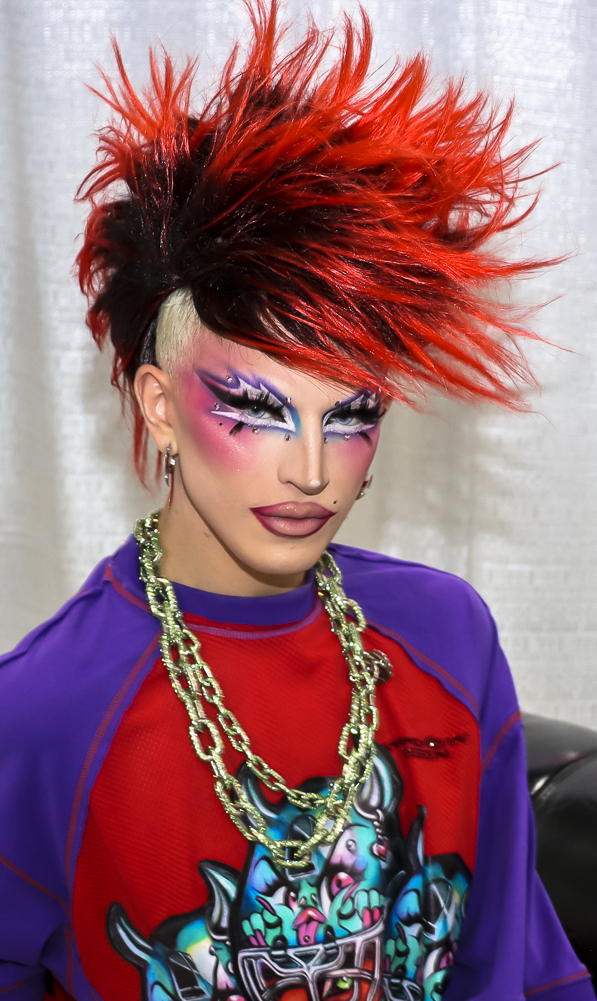
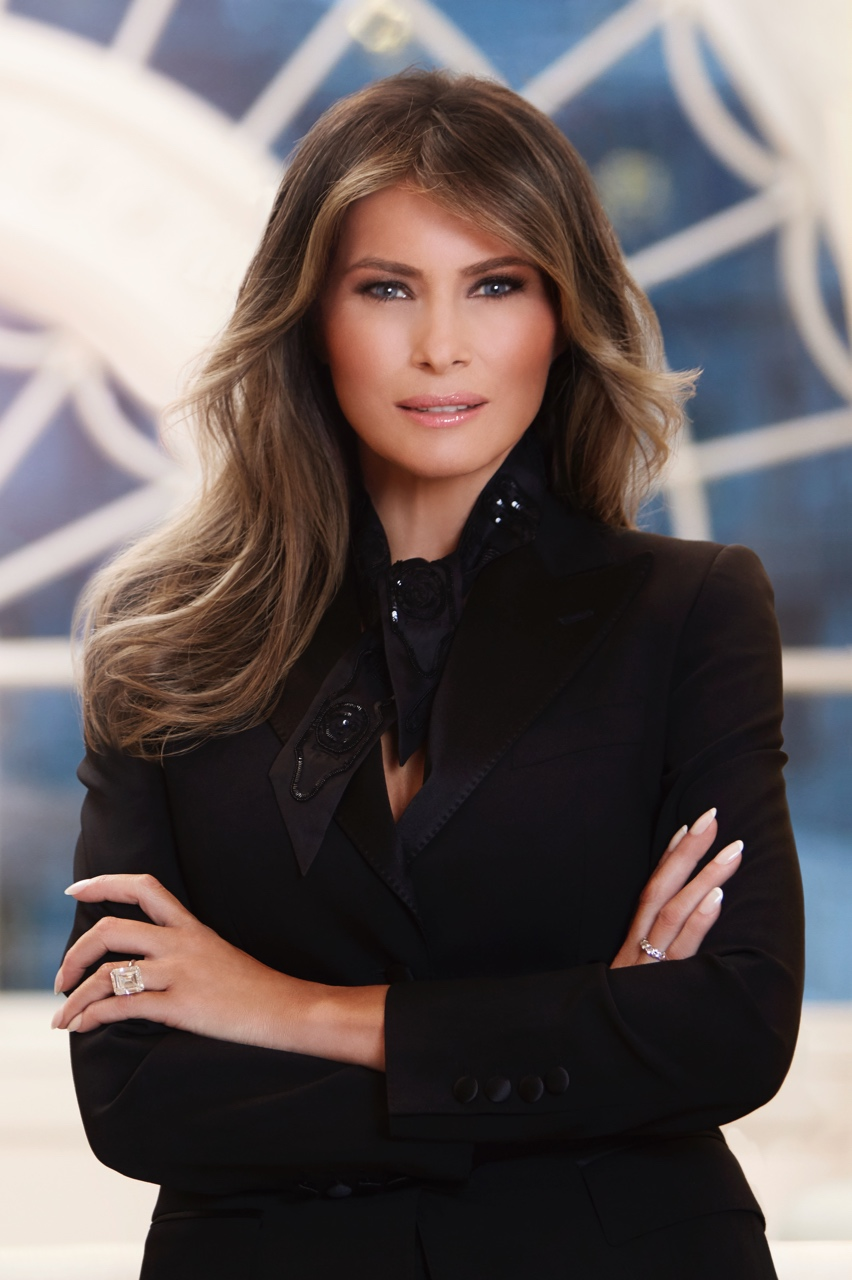
Aquaria (left) won on season 10 for her portrayal of Melania Trump (right).
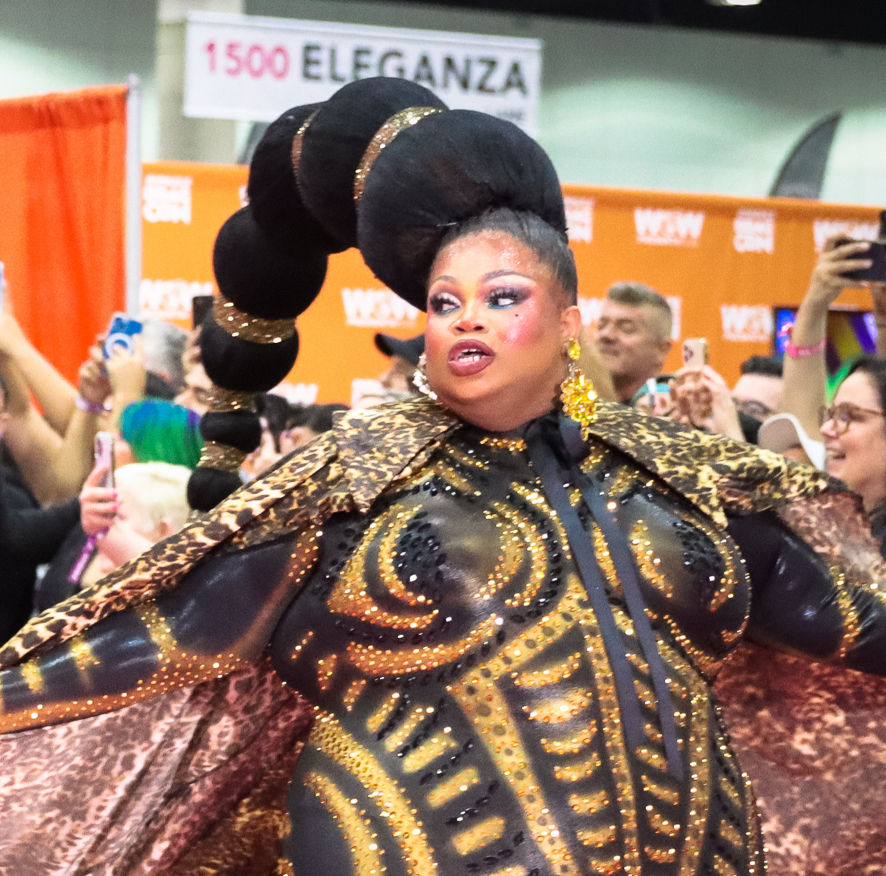
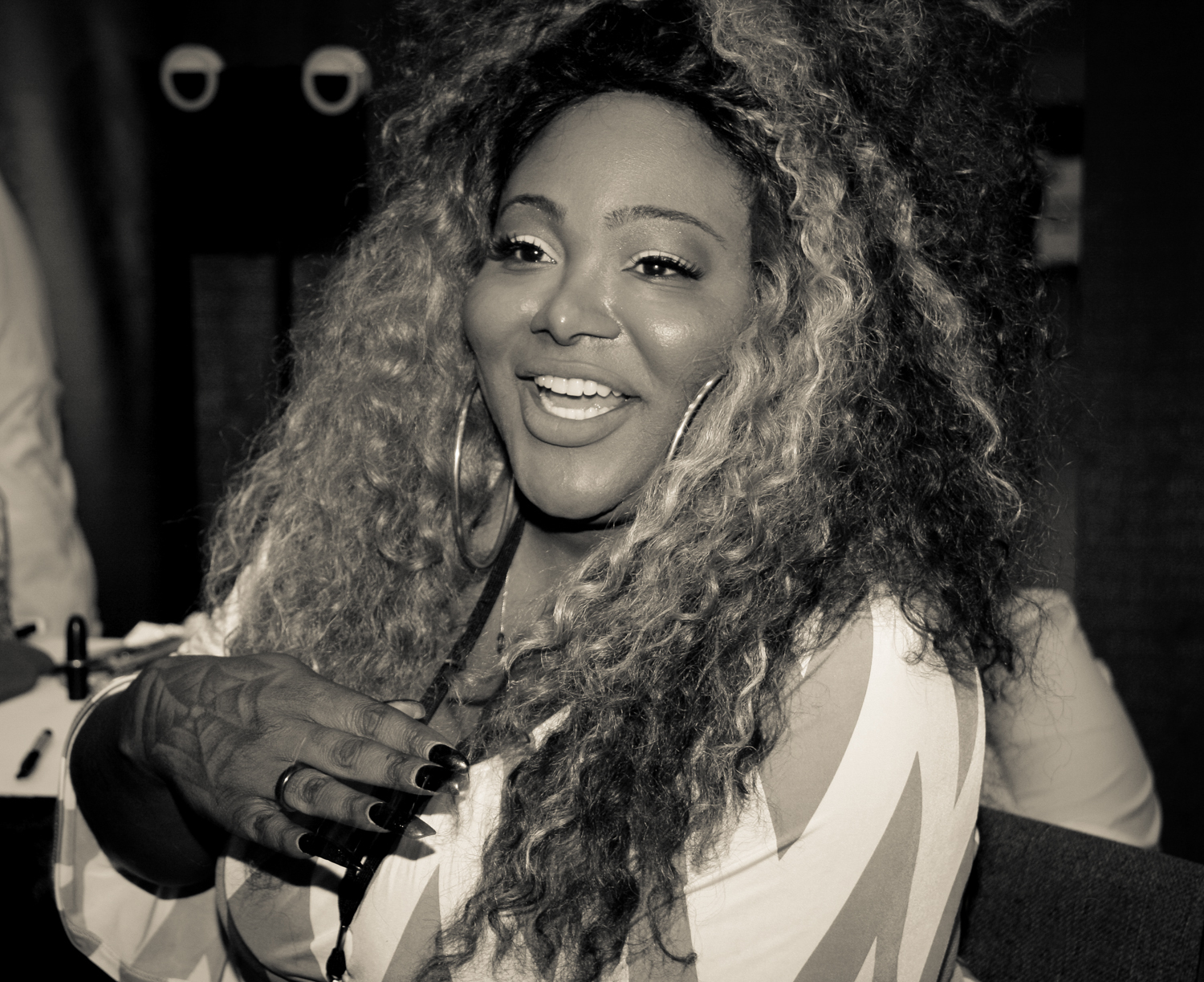
Silky Nutmeg Ganache (left) won on season 11 for her portrayal of Ts Madison (right).
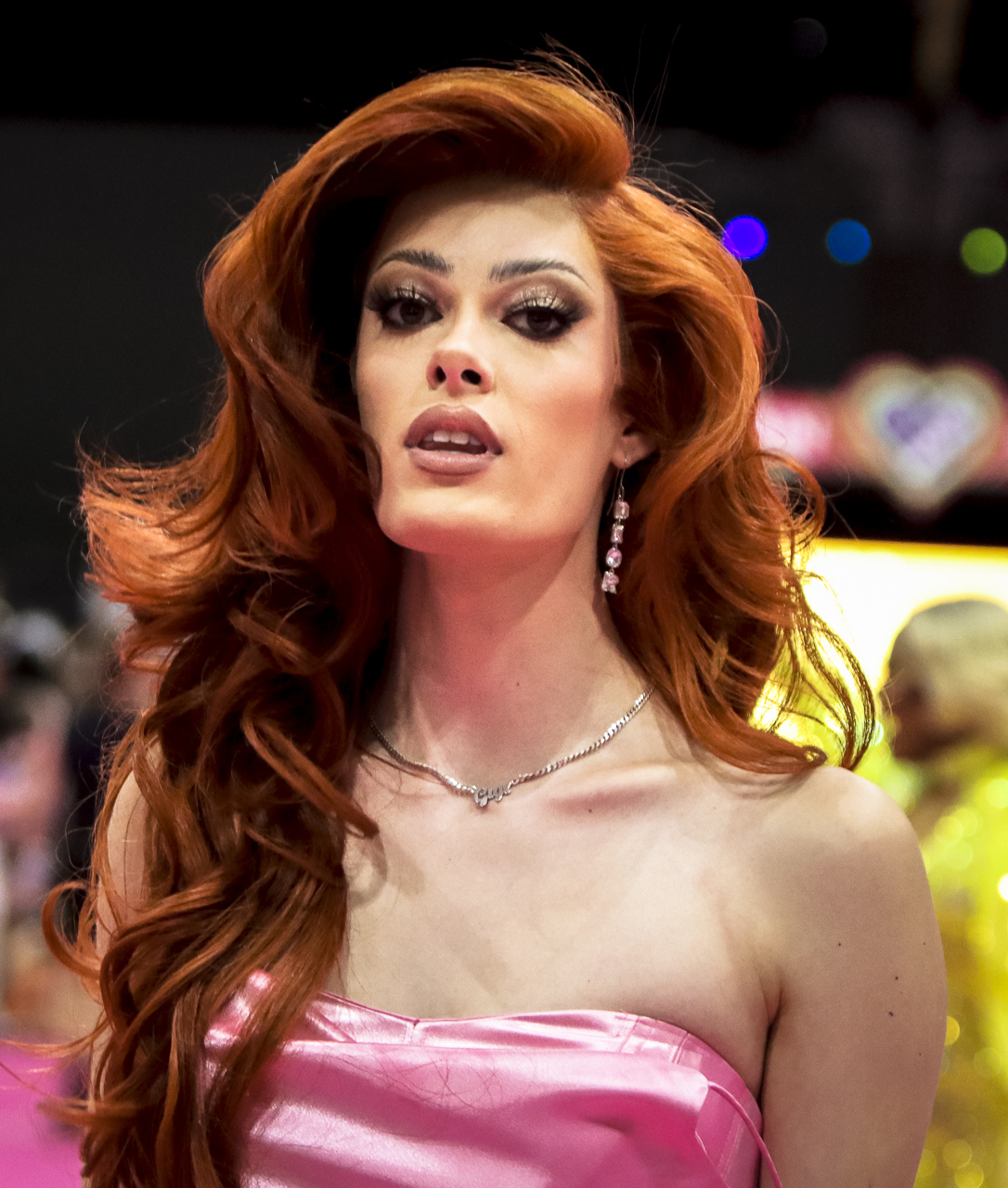
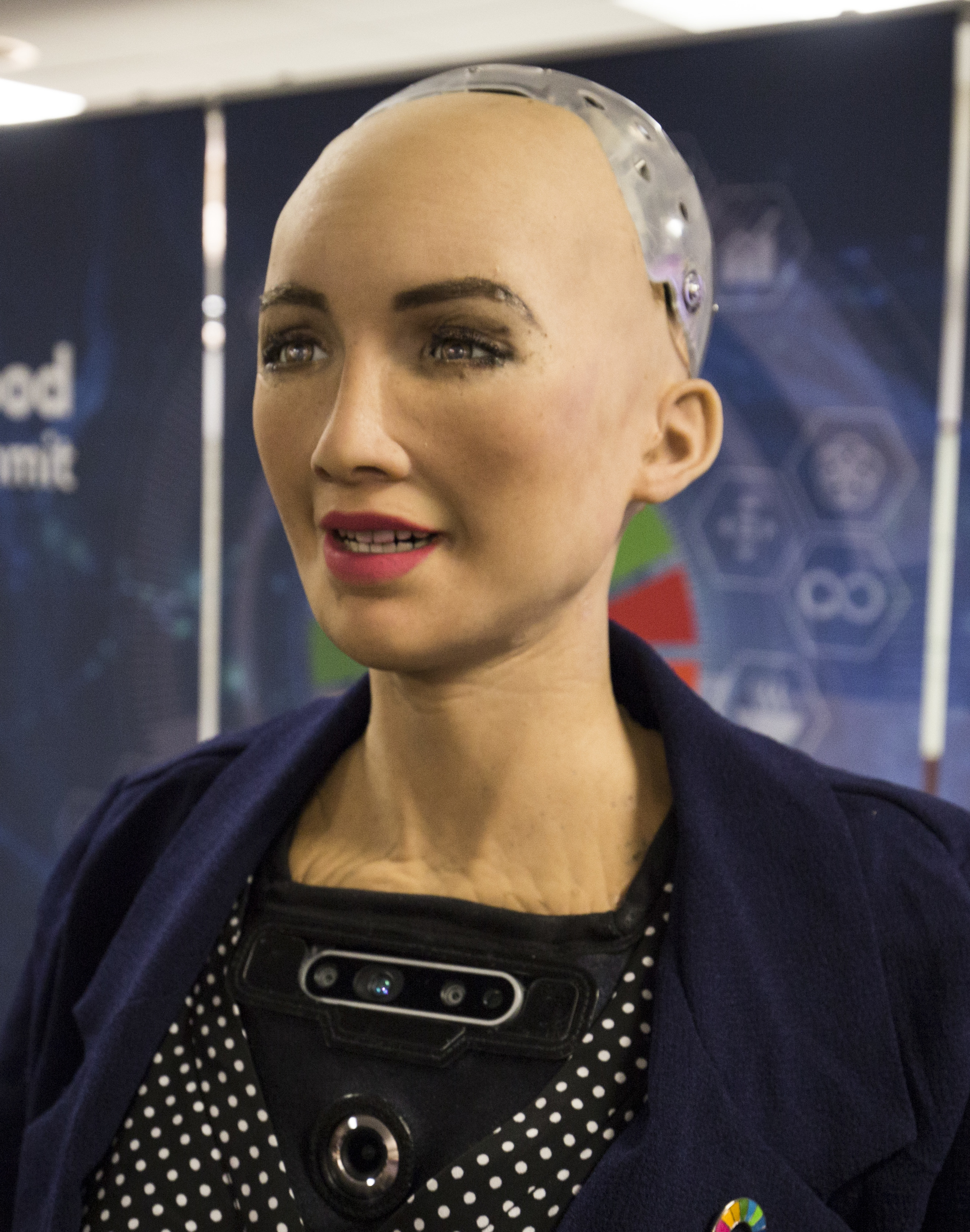
Gigi Goode (left) won on season 12 for her impersonation of Maria the Robot, a parody of the humanoid robot Sophia (right).
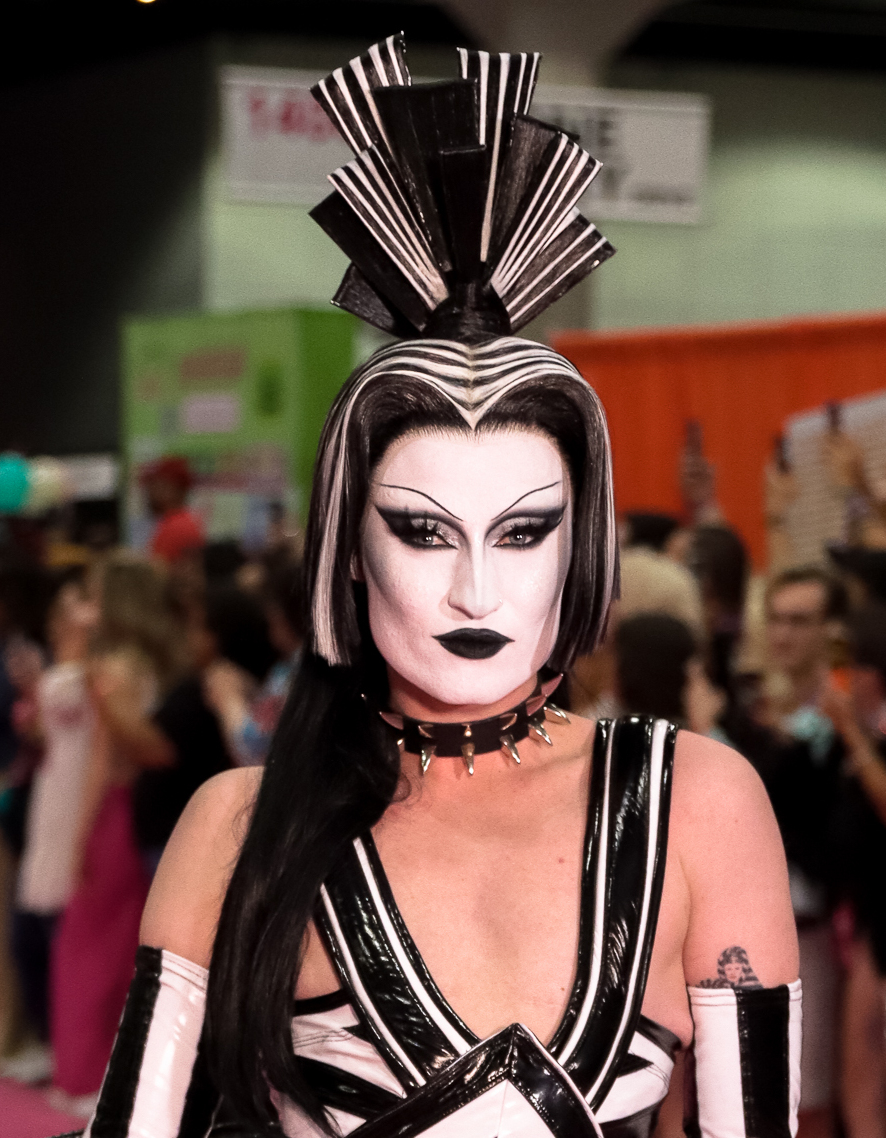
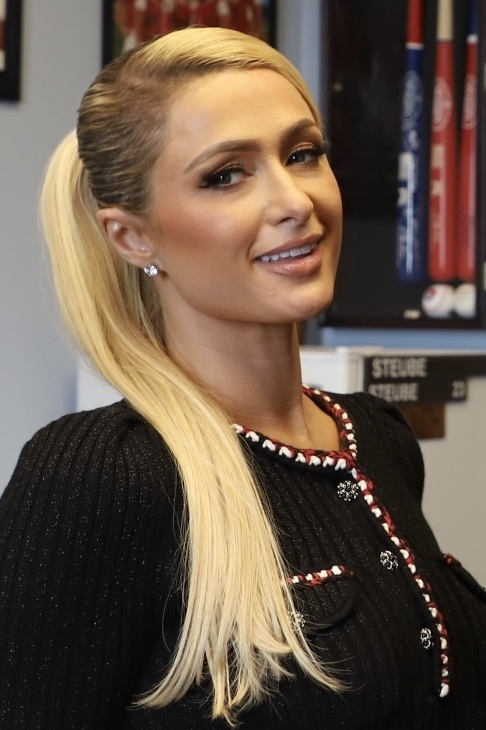
Gottmik (left) won on season 13 for her impersonation of Paris Hilton (right).
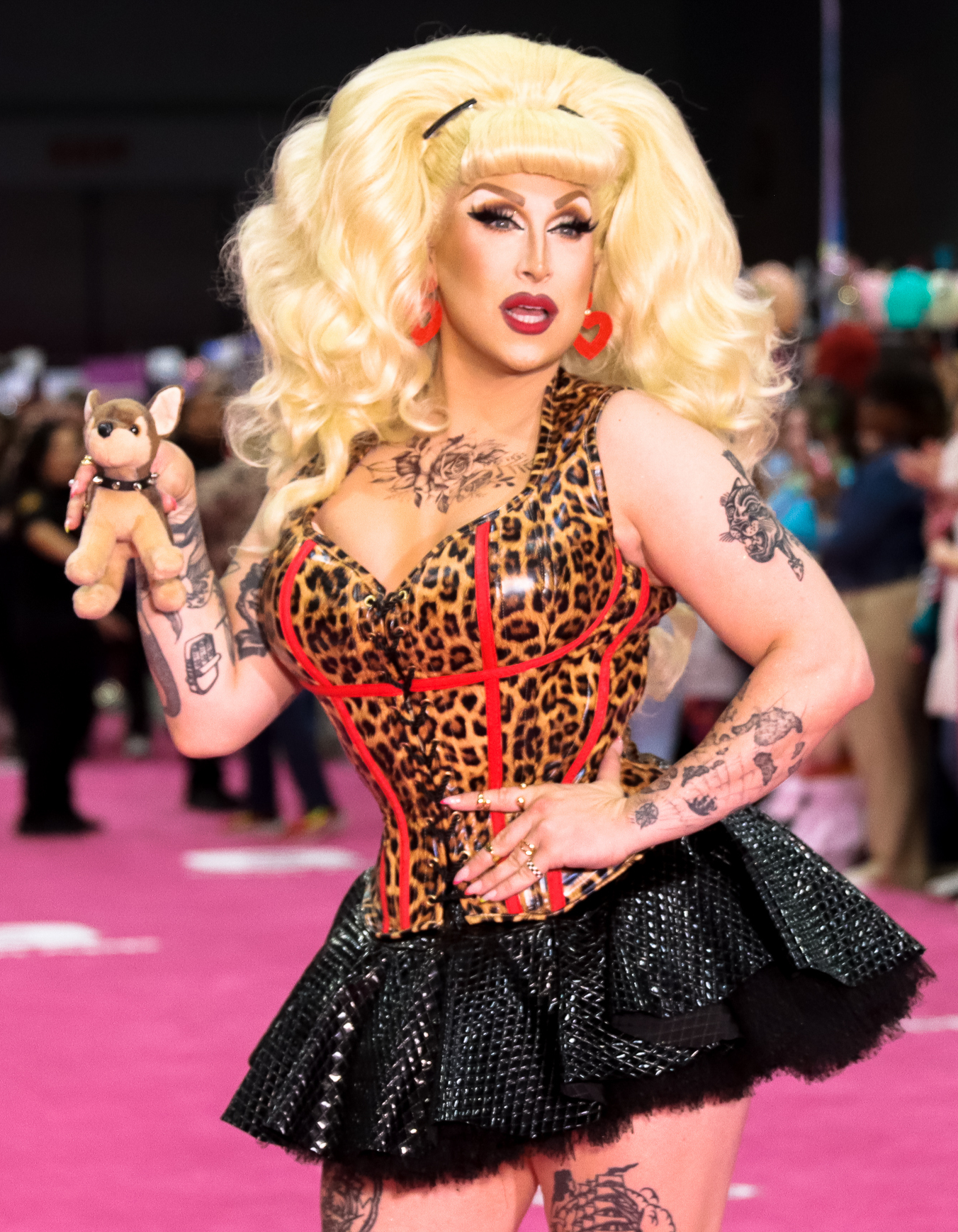
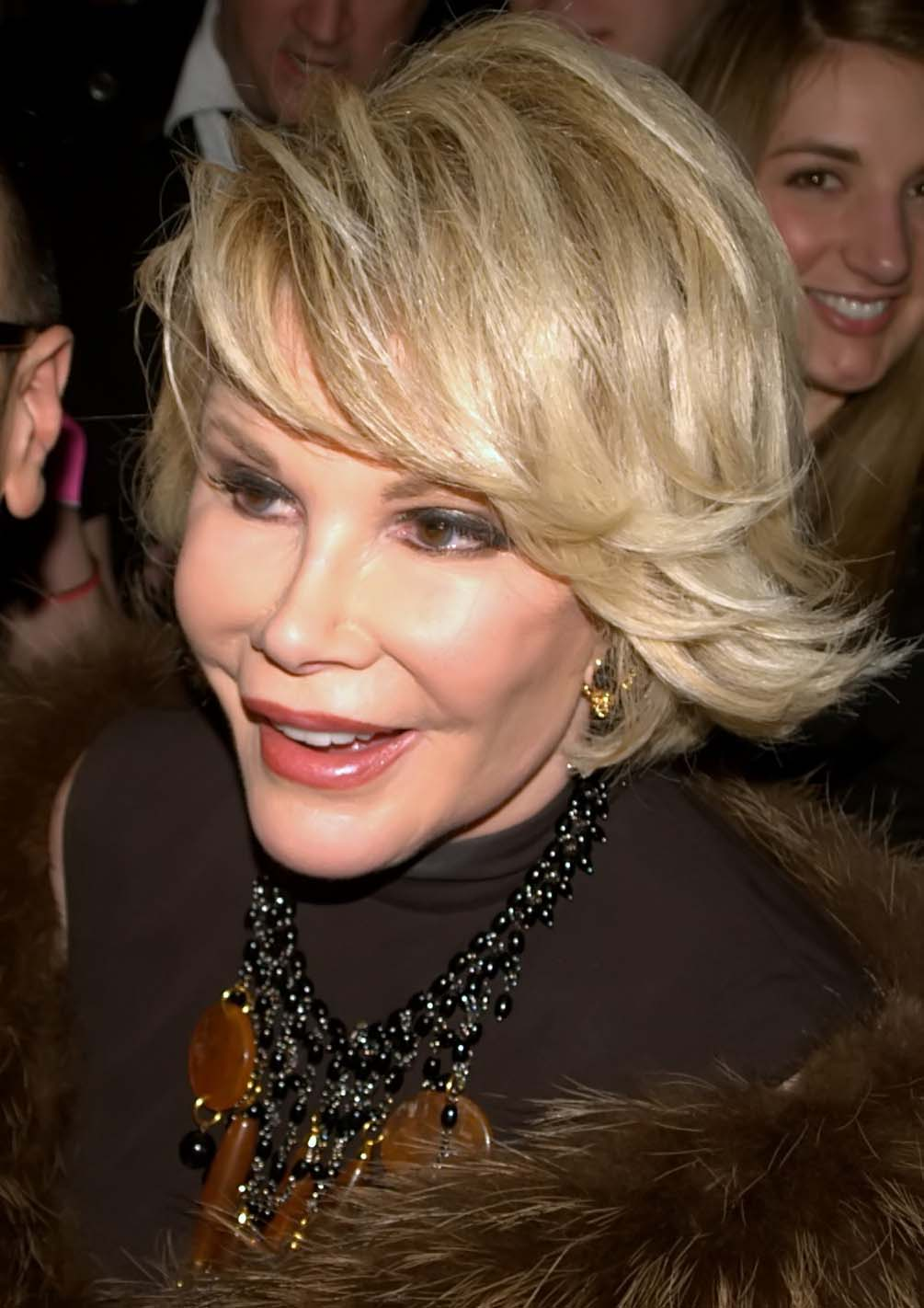
Loosey LaDuca (left) won on season 15 for her portrayal of Joan Rivers (right).
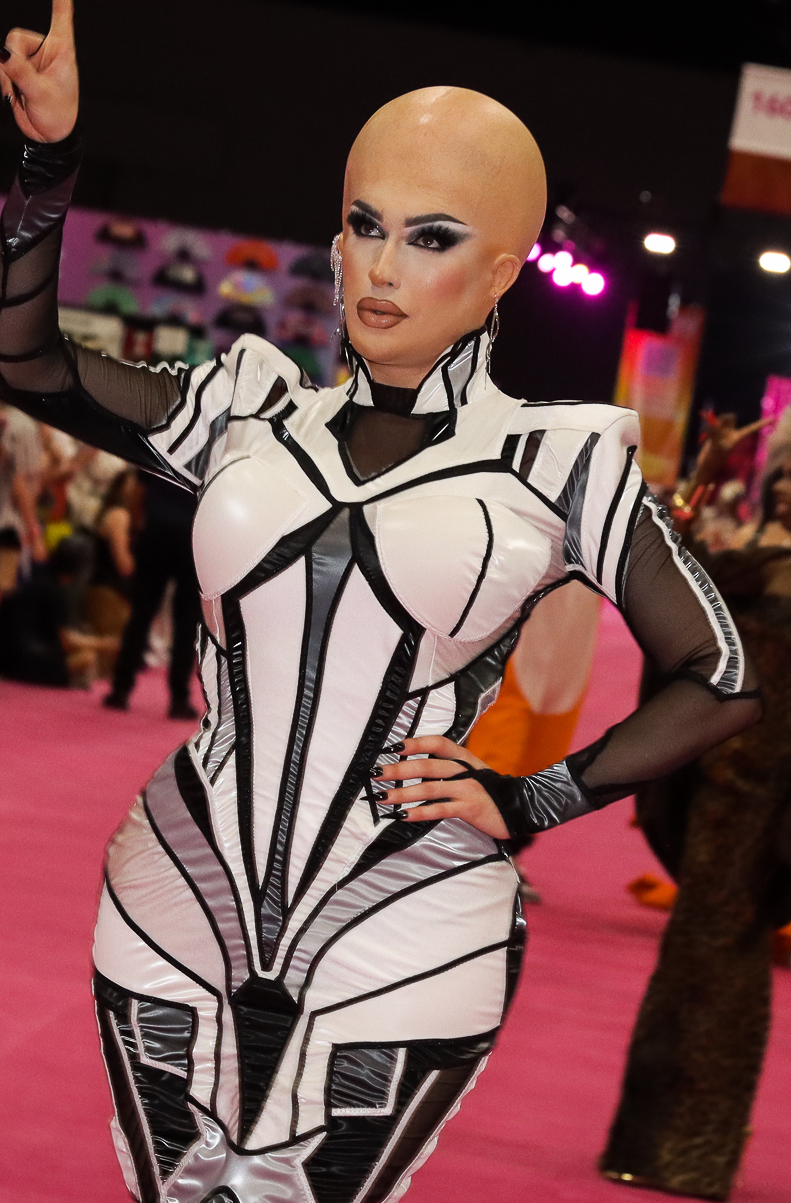
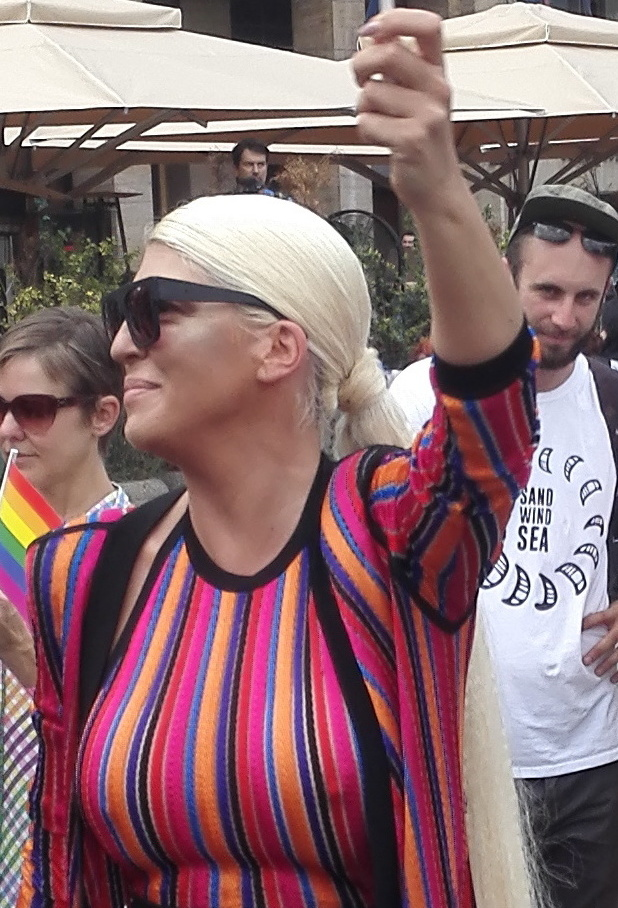
Plane Jane (left) won on season 16 for her portrayal of Jelena Karleuša (right).

Contestants of RuPaul's Drag Race and their imitations
Season	Guest celebrities	Contestant	Impersonation	Result
2	Alec Mapa; Phoebe Price	Tatianna	Britney Spears	WIN
2	Alec Mapa; Phoebe Price	Jessica Wild	RuPaul	SAFE
2	Alec Mapa; Phoebe Price	Jujubee	Kimora Lee Simmons	SAFE
2	Alec Mapa; Phoebe Price	Pandora Boxx	Carol Channing	SAFE
2	Alec Mapa; Phoebe Price	Raven	Paris Hilton	SAFE
2	Alec Mapa; Phoebe Price	Sahara Davenport	Whitney Houston	SAFE
2	Alec Mapa; Phoebe Price	Tyra Sanchez	Beyoncé	SAFE
2	Alec Mapa; Phoebe Price	Morgan McMichaels	Pink	BTM
2	Alec Mapa; Phoebe Price	Sonique	Lady Gaga	ELIM
3	Amber Rose; Aisha Tyler	Stacy Layne Matthews	Mo'Nique (Note: as Mary Lee Johnston from Precious)	WIN
3	Amber Rose; Aisha Tyler	Alexis Mateo	Alicia Keys	SAFE
3	Amber Rose; Aisha Tyler	Carmen Carrera	Jennifer Lopez	SAFE
3	Amber Rose; Aisha Tyler	Manila Luzon	Imelda Marcos	SAFE
3	Amber Rose; Aisha Tyler	Raja	Tyra Banks	SAFE
3	Amber Rose; Aisha Tyler	Shangela	Tina Turner	SAFE
3	Amber Rose; Aisha Tyler	Yara Sofia	Amy Winehouse	SAFE
3	Amber Rose; Aisha Tyler	Delta Work	Cher	BTM
3	Amber Rose; Aisha Tyler	Mariah	Joan Crawford (Note: as Faye Dunaway's portrayal of Crawford in Mommie Dearest)	ELIM
4	Loretta Devine; Ross Mathews	Chad Michaels	Cher	WIN
4	Loretta Devine; Ross Mathews	DiDa Ritz	Wendy Williams	SAFE
4	Loretta Devine; Ross Mathews	Jiggly Caliente	Snooki	SAFE
4	Loretta Devine; Ross Mathews	Latrice Royale	Aretha Franklin	SAFE
4	Loretta Devine; Ross Mathews	Phi Phi O'Hara	Lady Gaga	SAFE
4	Loretta Devine; Ross Mathews	Sharon Needles	Michelle Visage	SAFE
4	Loretta Devine; Ross Mathews	Willam	Jessica Simpson	SAFE
4	Loretta Devine; Ross Mathews	Milan	Diana Ross	BTM
4	Loretta Devine; Ross Mathews	Kenya Michaels	Beyoncé	ELIM
5	Julie Brown; Downtown Julie Brown	Jinkx Monsoon	Little Edie	WIN
5	Julie Brown; Downtown Julie Brown	Alaska	Lady Bunny	SAFE
5	Julie Brown; Downtown Julie Brown	Alyssa Edwards	Katy Perry	SAFE
5	Julie Brown; Downtown Julie Brown	Coco Montrese	Janet Jackson	SAFE
5	Julie Brown; Downtown Julie Brown	Ivy Winters	Marilyn Monroe	SAFE
5	Julie Brown; Downtown Julie Brown	Jade Jolie	Taylor Swift	SAFE
5	Julie Brown; Downtown Julie Brown	Roxxxy Andrews	Tamar Braxton	SAFE
5	Julie Brown; Downtown Julie Brown	Detox	Ke$ha	BTM
5	Julie Brown; Downtown Julie Brown	Lineysha Sparx	Celia Cruz	ELIM
6	Gillian Jacobs; Heather McDonald	BenDeLaCreme	Maggie Smith (Note: as Violet Crawley from Downton Abbey)	WIN
6	Gillian Jacobs; Heather McDonald	Adore Delano	Anna Nicole Smith	SAFE
6	Gillian Jacobs; Heather McDonald	Bianca Del Rio	Judge Judy	SAFE
6	Gillian Jacobs; Heather McDonald	Courtney Act	Fran Drescher (Note: as Fran Fine from The Nanny)	SAFE
6	Gillian Jacobs; Heather McDonald	Darienne Lake	Paula Deen	SAFE
6	Gillian Jacobs; Heather McDonald	Joslyn Fox	Teresa Giudice	SAFE
6	Gillian Jacobs; Heather McDonald	Milk	Julia Child	SAFE
6	Gillian Jacobs; Heather McDonald	Trinity K. Bonet	Nicki Minaj	SAFE
6	Gillian Jacobs; Heather McDonald	Laganja Estranja	Rachel Zoe	BTM
6	Gillian Jacobs; Heather McDonald	Gia Gunn	Kim Kardashian	ELIM
7	Tamar Braxton; Michael Urie	Ginger Minj	Adele	WIN
7	Tamar Braxton; Michael Urie	Kennedy Davenport	Little Richard	WIN
7	Tamar Braxton; Michael Urie	Miss Fame	Donatella Versace	SAFE
7	Tamar Braxton; Michael Urie	Katya	Suze Orman	SAFE
7	Tamar Braxton; Michael Urie	Pearl	Big Ang	SAFE
7	Tamar Braxton; Michael Urie	Violet Chachki	Alyssa Edwards	SAFE
7	Tamar Braxton; Michael Urie	Jaidynn Diore Fierce	Raven-Symoné	BTM
7	Tamar Braxton; Michael Urie	Max	Sharon Needles	ELIM
8 Supermodel Snatch Game	Gigi Hadid; Chanel Iman	Bob the Drag Queen	Uzo Aduba (Note: as Suzanne "Crazy Eyes" Warren from Orange is the New Black)	WIN
8 Supermodel Snatch Game	Gigi Hadid; Chanel Iman	Bob the Drag Queen	Carol Channing	WIN
8 Supermodel Snatch Game	Gigi Hadid; Chanel Iman	Chi Chi DeVayne	Eartha Kitt	SAFE
8 Supermodel Snatch Game	Gigi Hadid; Chanel Iman	Derrick Barry	Britney Spears	SAFE
8 Supermodel Snatch Game	Gigi Hadid; Chanel Iman	Kim Chi	Kimmy Jong-Un (Note: a parodic Kim Jong-un's sister)	SAFE
8 Supermodel Snatch Game	Gigi Hadid; Chanel Iman	Robbie Turner	Diana Vreeland	SAFE
8 Supermodel Snatch Game	Gigi Hadid; Chanel Iman	Thorgy Thor	Michael Jackson	SAFE
8 Supermodel Snatch Game	Gigi Hadid; Chanel Iman	Naomi Smalls	Tiffany Pollard	BTM
8 Supermodel Snatch Game	Gigi Hadid; Chanel Iman	Acid Betty	Nancy Grace	ELIM
9	Candis Cayne; Denis O'Hare	Alexis Michelle	Liza Minnelli	WIN
9	Candis Cayne; Denis O'Hare	Aja	Alyssa Edwards	SAFE
9	Candis Cayne; Denis O'Hare	Farrah Moan	Gigi Gorgeous	SAFE
9	Candis Cayne; Denis O'Hare	Nina Bo'nina Brown	Jasmine Masters	SAFE
9	Candis Cayne; Denis O'Hare	Sasha Velour	Marlene Dietrich	SAFE
9	Candis Cayne; Denis O'Hare	Shea Couleé	Naomi Campbell	SAFE
9	Candis Cayne; Denis O'Hare	Trinity Taylor	Amanda Lepore	SAFE
9	Candis Cayne; Denis O'Hare	Valentina	Ariadna Gutiérrez	SAFE
9	Candis Cayne; Denis O'Hare	Peppermint	NeNe Leakes	BTM
9	Candis Cayne; Denis O'Hare	Cynthia Lee Fontaine	Sofia Vergara	ELIM
10	Audra McDonald; Kate Upton	Aquaria	Melania Trump	WIN
10	Audra McDonald; Kate Upton	Asia O'Hara	Beyoncé	SAFE
10	Audra McDonald; Kate Upton	Eureka	Alana "Honey Boo Boo" Thompson	SAFE
10	Audra McDonald; Kate Upton	Kameron Michaels	Chyna	SAFE
10	Audra McDonald; Kate Upton	Miz Cracker	Dorothy Parker	SAFE
10	Audra McDonald; Kate Upton	Monét X Change	Maya Angelou	SAFE
10	Audra McDonald; Kate Upton	The Vixen	Blue Ivy Carter	BTM
10	Audra McDonald; Kate Upton	Monique Heart	Maxine Waters	ELIM
11; Snatch Game at Sea	Clea DuVall; Tony Hale	Silky Nutmeg Ganache	Ts Madison	WIN
11; Snatch Game at Sea	Clea DuVall; Tony Hale	A'keria C. Davenport	Tiffany Haddish	SAFE
11; Snatch Game at Sea	Clea DuVall; Tony Hale	Nina West	Harvey Fierstein	SAFE
11; Snatch Game at Sea	Clea DuVall; Tony Hale	Nina West	Jo Anne Worley	SAFE
11; Snatch Game at Sea	Clea DuVall; Tony Hale	Plastique Tiara	Lovely Mimi	SAFE
11; Snatch Game at Sea	Clea DuVall; Tony Hale	Shuga Cain	Charo	SAFE
11; Snatch Game at Sea	Clea DuVall; Tony Hale	Vanessa Vanjie Mateo	Danielle Bregoli	SAFE
11; Snatch Game at Sea	Clea DuVall; Tony Hale	Brooke Lynn Hytes	Celine Dion	BTM
11; Snatch Game at Sea	Clea DuVall; Tony Hale	Yvie Oddly	Whoopi Goldberg	BTM
12	Daniel Franzese; Jonathan Bennett	Gigi Goode	Maria the Robot	WIN
12	Daniel Franzese; Jonathan Bennett	Crystal Methyd	Poppy	SAFE
12	Daniel Franzese; Jonathan Bennett	Heidi N Closet	Leslie Jones	SAFE
12	Daniel Franzese; Jonathan Bennett	Jackie Cox	Lisa Rinna	SAFE
12	Daniel Franzese; Jonathan Bennett	Jaida Essence Hall	Cardi B	SAFE
12	Daniel Franzese; Jonathan Bennett	Jan	Bernadette Peters	SAFE
12	Daniel Franzese; Jonathan Bennett	Sherry Pie	Katharine Hepburn	SAFE
12	Daniel Franzese; Jonathan Bennett	Widow Von'Du	Tina Turner	SAFE
12	Daniel Franzese; Jonathan Bennett	Widow Von'Du	Ike Turner	SAFE
12	Daniel Franzese; Jonathan Bennett	Brita	Jennifer Holliday	BTM
12	Daniel Franzese; Jonathan Bennett	Aiden Zhane	Patricia Quinn	ELIM
13	Raven; Victoria "Porkchop" Parker	Gottmik	Paris Hilton	WIN
13	Raven; Victoria "Porkchop" Parker	Denali	Jonathan Van Ness	SAFE
13	Raven; Victoria "Porkchop" Parker	Kandy Muse	Patrick Starrr	SAFE
13	Raven; Victoria "Porkchop" Parker	Olivia Lux	Tabitha Brown	SAFE
13	Raven; Victoria "Porkchop" Parker	Rosé	Mary, Queen of Scots	SAFE
13	Raven; Victoria "Porkchop" Parker	Symone	Harriet Tubman	SAFE
13	Raven; Victoria "Porkchop" Parker	Tina Burner	Richard Simmons	SAFE
13	Raven; Victoria "Porkchop" Parker	Utica Queen	Bob Ross	BTM
13	Raven; Victoria "Porkchop" Parker	Elliott with 2 Ts	Rue McClanahan (Note: as Blanche Devereaux from The Golden Girls)	ELIM
14	Raven; Dove Cameron	DeJa Skye	Lil Jon	WIN
14	Raven; Dove Cameron	Angeria Paris VanMicheals	Tammie Brown	BTM
14	Raven; Dove Cameron	Bosco	Gwyneth Paltrow	BTM
14	Raven; Dove Cameron	Daya Betty	Ozzy Osbourne	BTM
14	Raven; Dove Cameron	Jorgeous	Ilana Glazer	BTM
14	Raven; Dove Cameron	Lady Camden	William Shakespeare	BTM
14	Raven; Dove Cameron	Willow Pill	Drew Barrymore	BTM
14	Raven; Dove Cameron	Jasmine Kennedie	Betsy DeVos	ELIM (Note: was eliminated in the following episode due to seven queens landing in the bottom.)
15 (Note: As a twist, the contestants were split in two groups to compete in two separate Snatch Games.); Supersized Snatch Game	Bruno Alcantara; Calixto Quan	Anetra	Gorgena Ramsay (Note: a parodic Gordon Ramsay's sister)	SAFE
15; Supersized Snatch Game	Bruno Alcantara; Calixto Quan	Luxx Noir London	Amanda Lepore	SAFE
15; Supersized Snatch Game	Bruno Alcantara; Calixto Quan	Malaysia Babydoll Foxx	Saucy Santana	SAFE
15; Supersized Snatch Game	Bruno Alcantara; Calixto Quan	Marcia Marcia Marcia	Tim Gunn	SAFE
15; Supersized Snatch Game	Bruno Alcantara; Calixto Quan	Mistress Isabelle Brooks	Rosie O'Donnell	SAFE
15; Supersized Snatch Game	Bruno Alcantara; Calixto Quan	Robin Fierce	Karen Huger	SAFE
15; Supersized Snatch Game	Bruno Alcantara; Calixto Quan	Salina EsTitties	Virgin Mary	SAFE
15; Supersized Snatch Game	Asaf Goren; Bryce Eilenberg	Loosey LaDuca	Joan Rivers	WIN
15; Supersized Snatch Game	Asaf Goren; Bryce Eilenberg	Amethyst	Patricia "Tan Mom" Krentcil	SAFE
15; Supersized Snatch Game	Asaf Goren; Bryce Eilenberg	Aura Mayari	Bretman Rock	SAFE
15; Supersized Snatch Game	Asaf Goren; Bryce Eilenberg	Jax	Mona Lisa	SAFE
15; Supersized Snatch Game	Asaf Goren; Bryce Eilenberg	Sasha Colby	Jan Crouch	SAFE
15; Supersized Snatch Game	Asaf Goren; Bryce Eilenberg	Spice	Miley Cyrus	BTM
15; Supersized Snatch Game	Asaf Goren; Bryce Eilenberg	Sugar	Trisha Paytas	ELIM
16	Laith Ashley; Jesse Pattison	Plane Jane	Jelena Karleuša	WIN
16	Laith Ashley; Jesse Pattison	Dawn	Meghan McCain	SAFE
16	Laith Ashley; Jesse Pattison	Mhi'ya Iman Le'Paige	Shaquita (Note: a parodic Trina's cousin)	SAFE
16	Laith Ashley; Jesse Pattison	Nymphia Wind	Jane Goodall	SAFE
16	Laith Ashley; Jesse Pattison	Plasma	Patti LuPone	SAFE
16	Laith Ashley; Jesse Pattison	Q	Amelia Earhart	SAFE
16	Laith Ashley; Jesse Pattison	Sapphira Cristál	James Brown	SAFE
16	Laith Ashley; Jesse Pattison	Morphine Love Dion	Anna Delvey	BTM
16	Laith Ashley; Jesse Pattison	Xunami Muse	Gold Tooth Fairy	ELIM
17	Alyssa Edwards; Gay-I (Note: a voiced prop)	Onya Nurve	Eddie Murphy	WIN
17	Alyssa Edwards; Gay-I	Acacia Forgot	Trisha Paytas	SAFE
17	Alyssa Edwards; Gay-I	Arrietty	Cupid	SAFE
17	Alyssa Edwards; Gay-I	Jewels Sparkles	Miss Big Feet	SAFE
17	Alyssa Edwards; Gay-I	Kori King	Big Ang	SAFE
17	Alyssa Edwards; Gay-I	Lexi Love	Gilbert Gottfried	SAFE
17	Alyssa Edwards; Gay-I	Lydia B Kollins	David Lynch	SAFE
17	Alyssa Edwards; Gay-I	Sam Star	Kim Gravel	SAFE
17	Alyssa Edwards; Gay-I	Suzie Toot	Ellen Greene (Note: as Audrey from Little Shop of Horrors)	SAFE
17	Alyssa Edwards; Gay-I	Lana Ja'Rae	Rosa Parks	BTM
17	Alyssa Edwards; Gay-I	Crystal Envy	Nicole Richie	ELIM
18; Snatch Game of Love Island	Zane Phillips; Froy Gutierrez; Chris Renfro	Nini Coco	Sir David Attenborough	WIN
18; Snatch Game of Love Island	Zane Phillips; Froy Gutierrez; Chris Renfro	Athena Dion	Greta Feta Onassis (Note: Parody of Tina Onassis Niarchos.)	SAFE
18; Snatch Game of Love Island	Zane Phillips; Froy Gutierrez; Chris Renfro	Darlene Mitchell	Mrs. Claus	SAFE
18; Snatch Game of Love Island	Zane Phillips; Froy Gutierrez; Chris Renfro	Discord Addams	The Pope	SAFE
18; Snatch Game of Love Island	Zane Phillips; Froy Gutierrez; Chris Renfro	Jane Don't	Truman Capote	SAFE
18; Snatch Game of Love Island	Zane Phillips; Froy Gutierrez; Chris Renfro	Juicy Love Dion	JoJo Siwa	SAFE
18; Snatch Game of Love Island	Zane Phillips; Froy Gutierrez; Chris Renfro	Myki Meeks	Drew Barrymore	SAFE
18; Snatch Game of Love Island	Zane Phillips; Froy Gutierrez; Chris Renfro	Kenya Pleaser	Lizzo	BTM
18; Snatch Game of Love Island	Zane Phillips; Froy Gutierrez; Chris Renfro	Mia Starr	Bloody Mary	ELIM

=== RuPaul's Drag Race All Stars ===
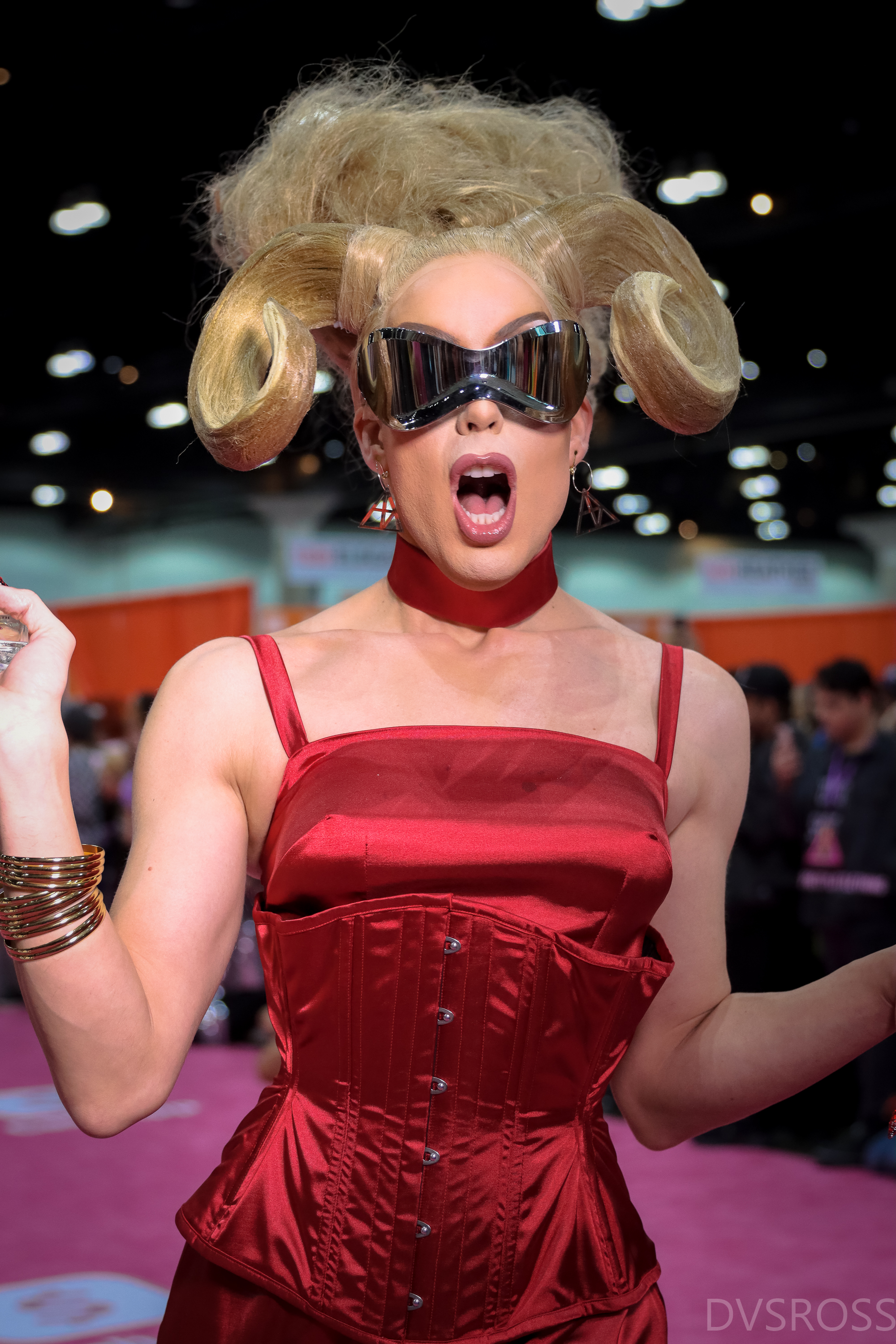
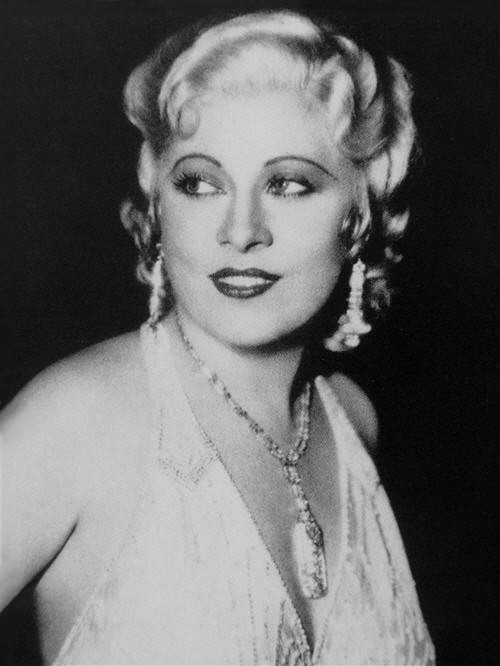
Alaska (left) won on season 2 for her portrayal of Mae West (right).
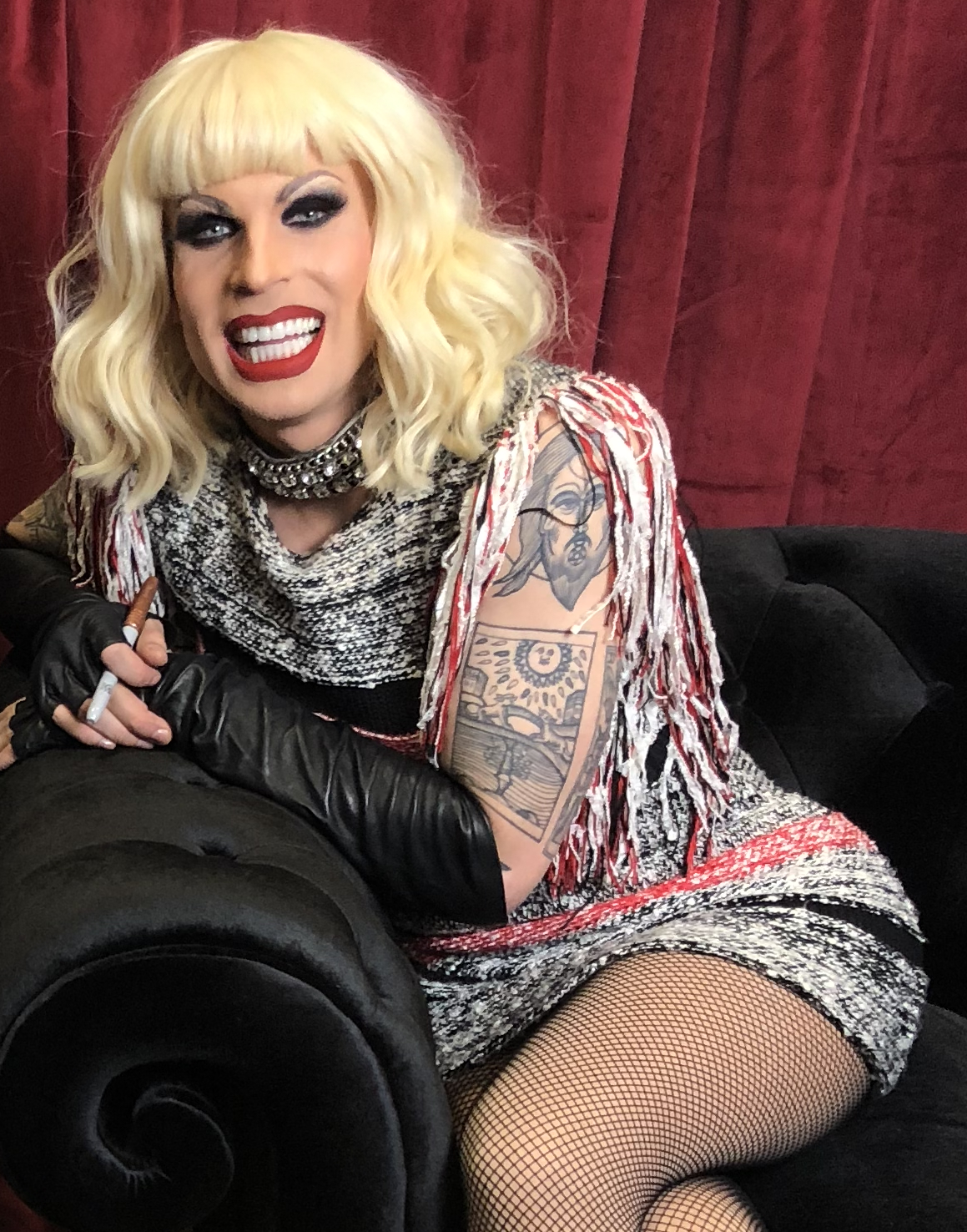
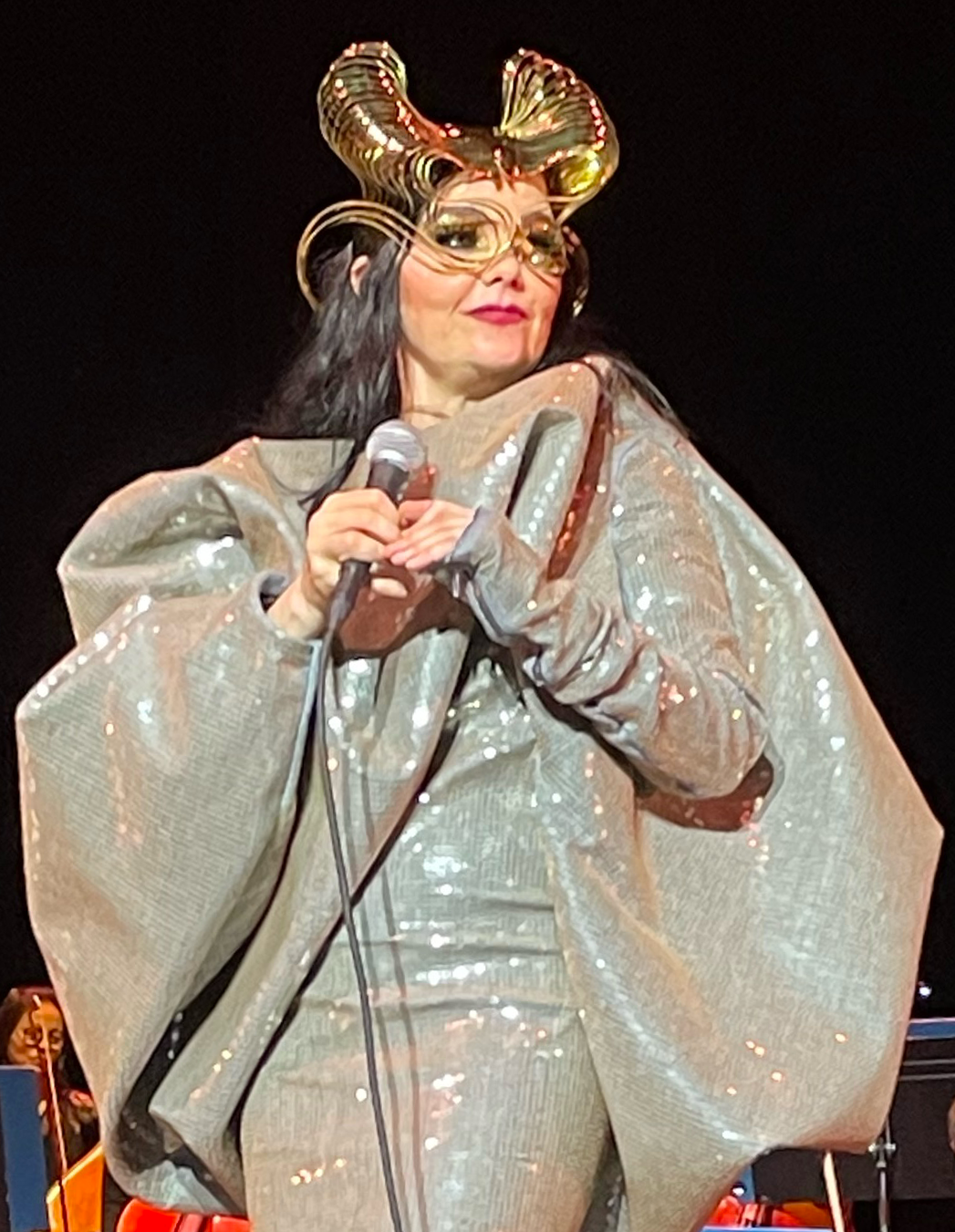
Katya (left) also won on season 2 for her portrayal of Björk (right).
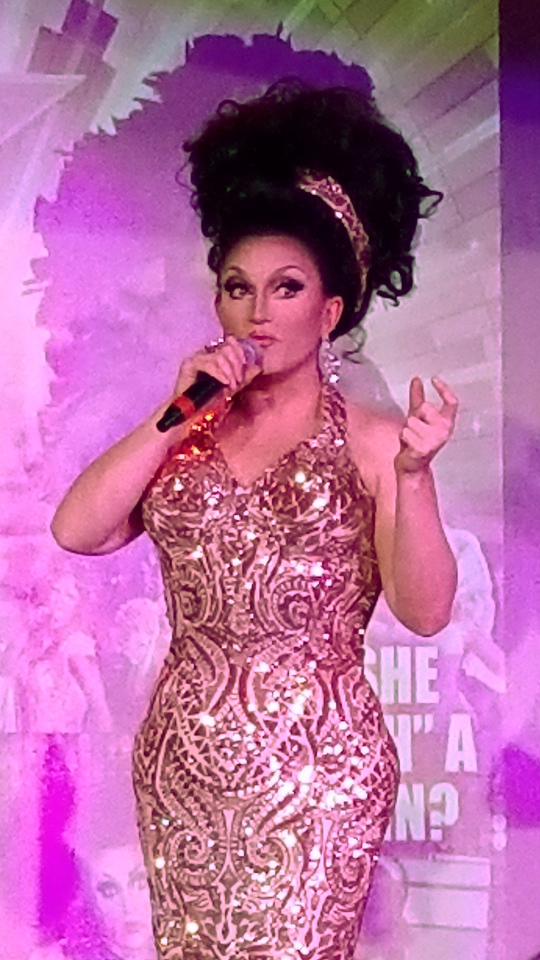
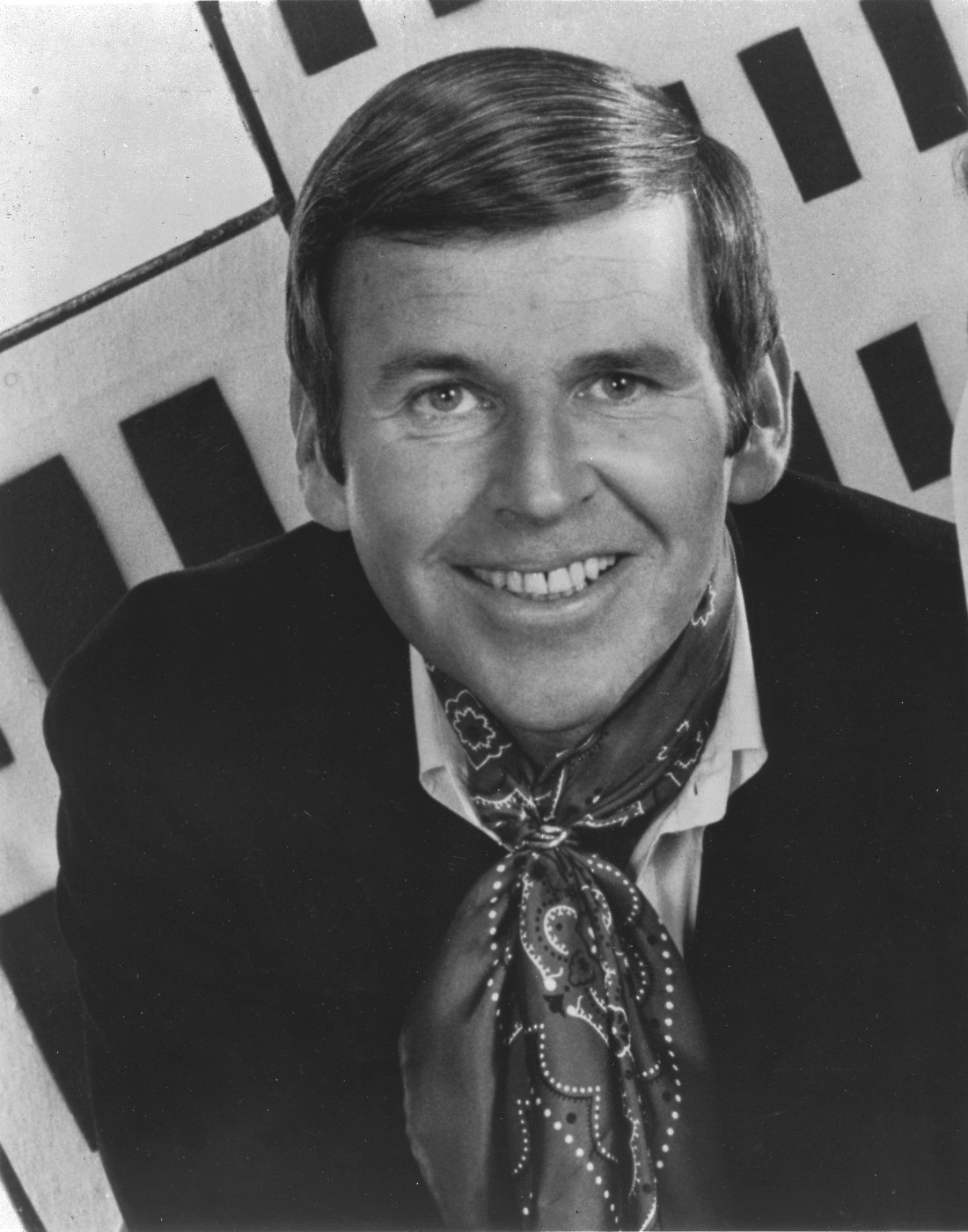
BenDeLaCreme (left) won on season 3 for her portrayal of Paul Lynde (right), becoming the first contestant to win the challenge twice.
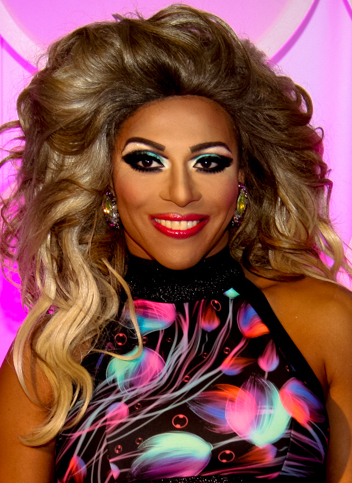
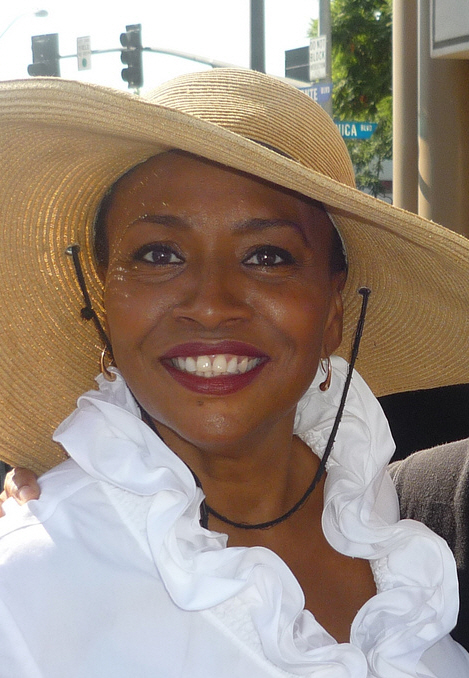
Shangela (left) also won on season 3 for her portrayal of Jenifer Lewis (right).
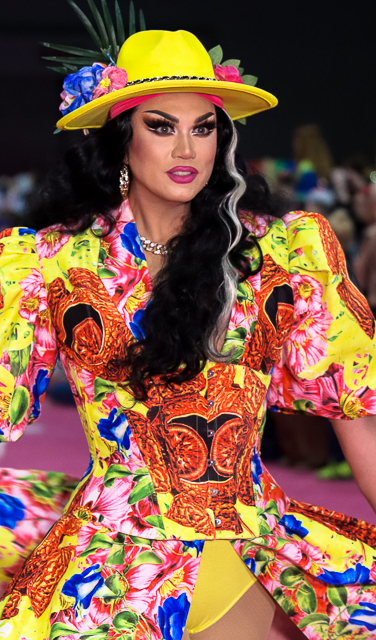
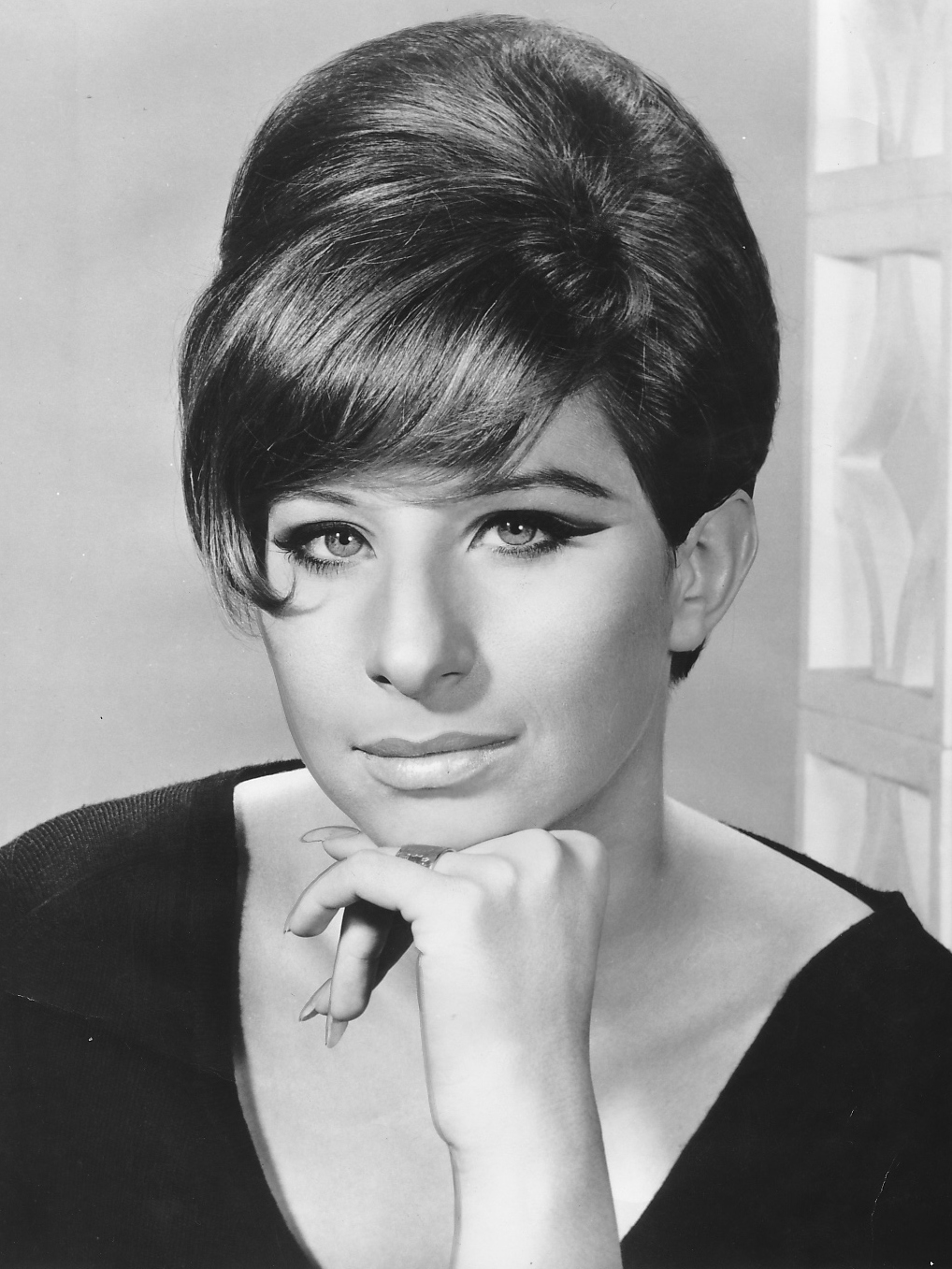
Manila Luzon (left) won on season 4 for her portrayal of Barbra Streisand (right).
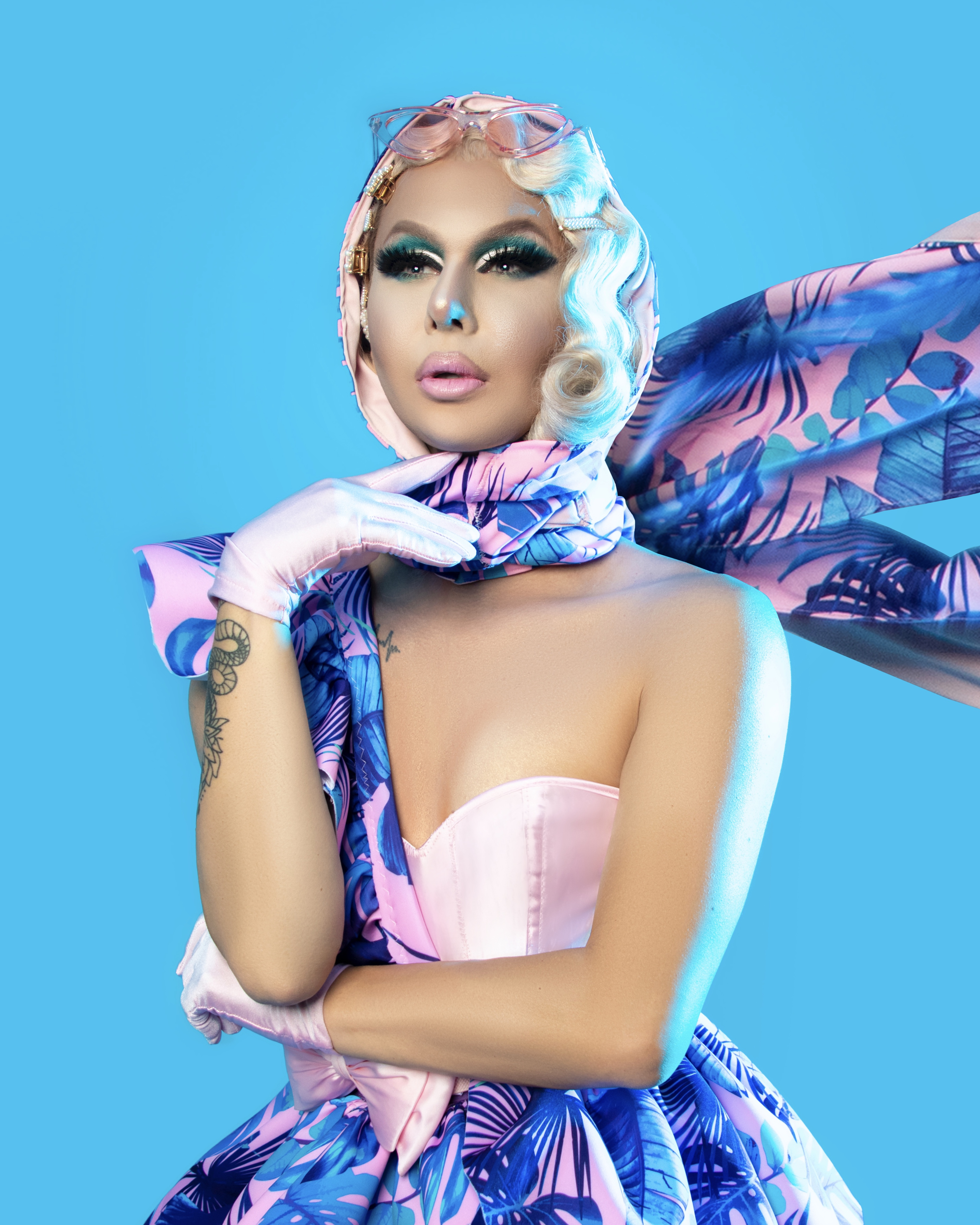
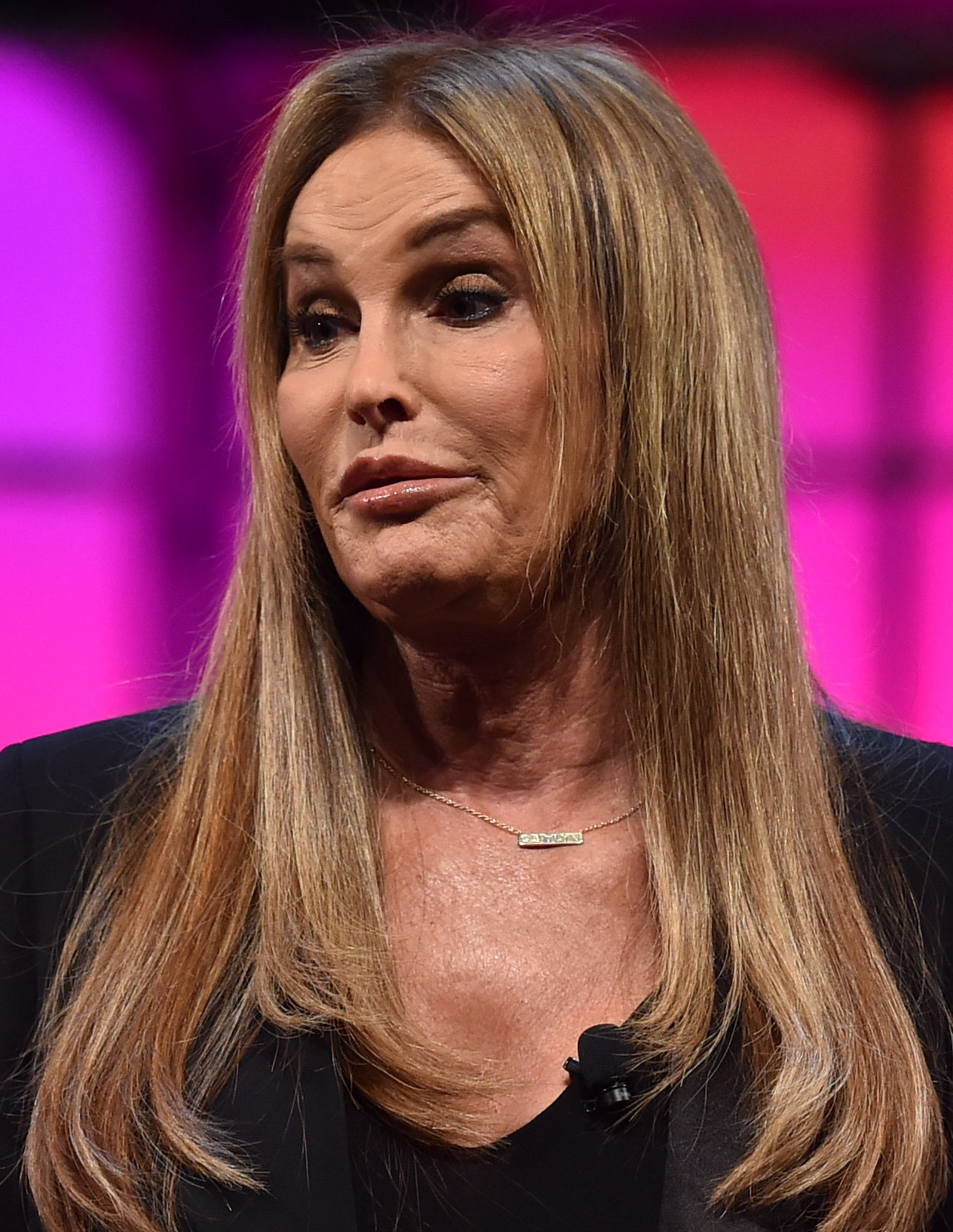
Trinity the Tuck (left) also won on season 4 for her portrayal Caitlyn Jenner (right).
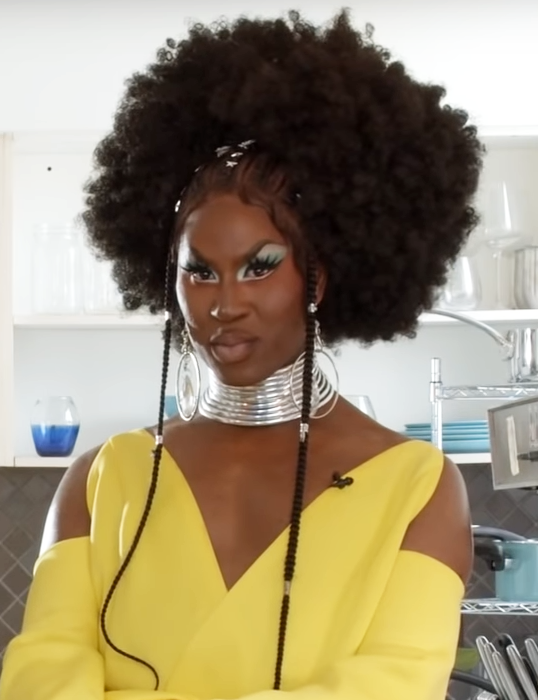
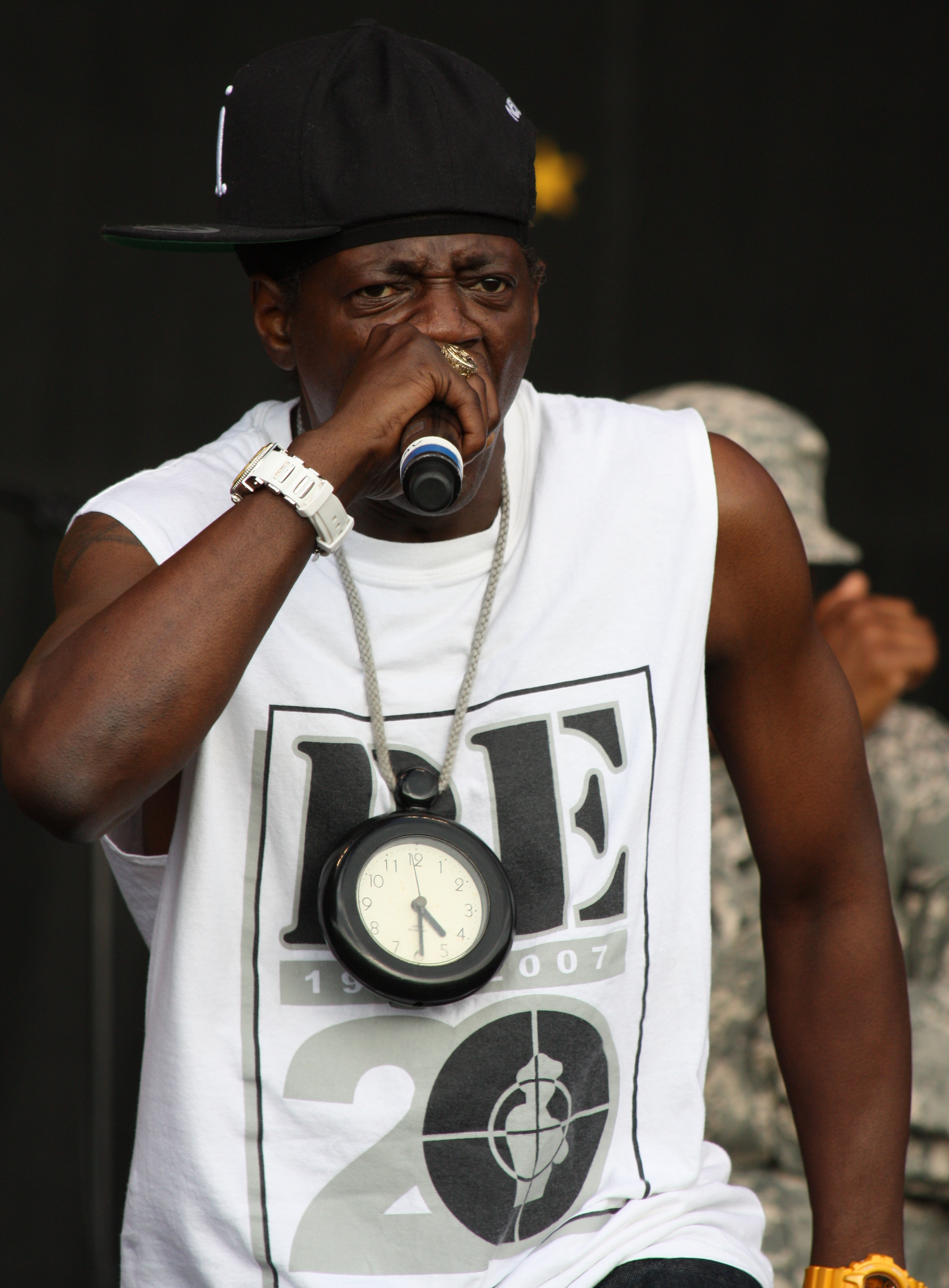
Shea Couleé (left) won on season 5 for her portrayal of Flavor Flav (right).
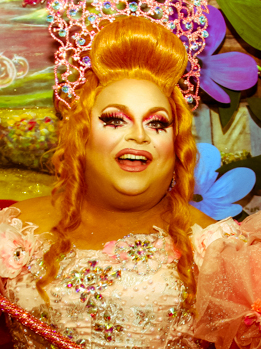
Ginger Minj (left) won on season 6 for her portrayal of Phyllis Diller (right), becoming the second contestant to win the challenge twice.
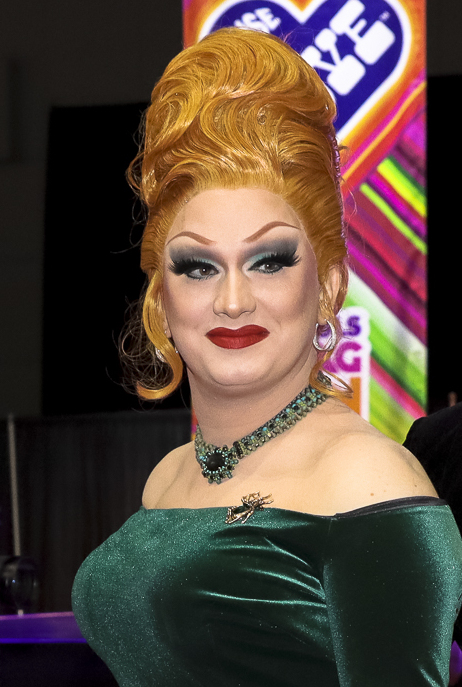
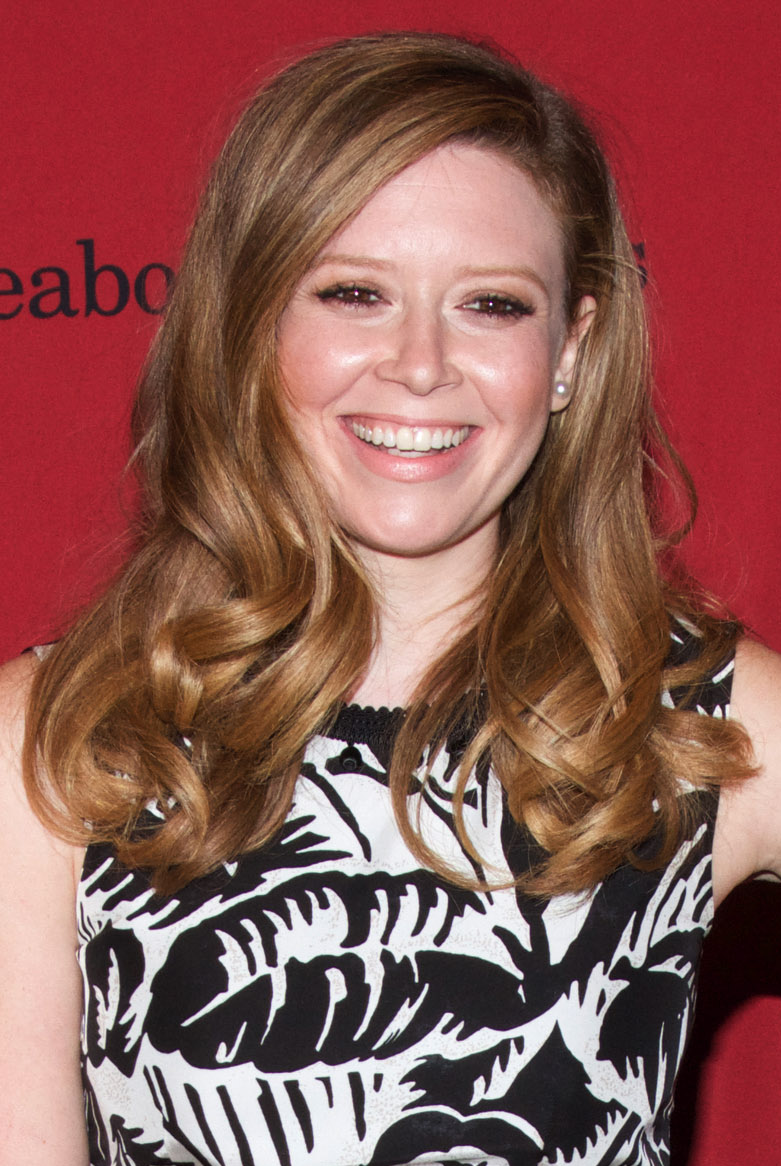
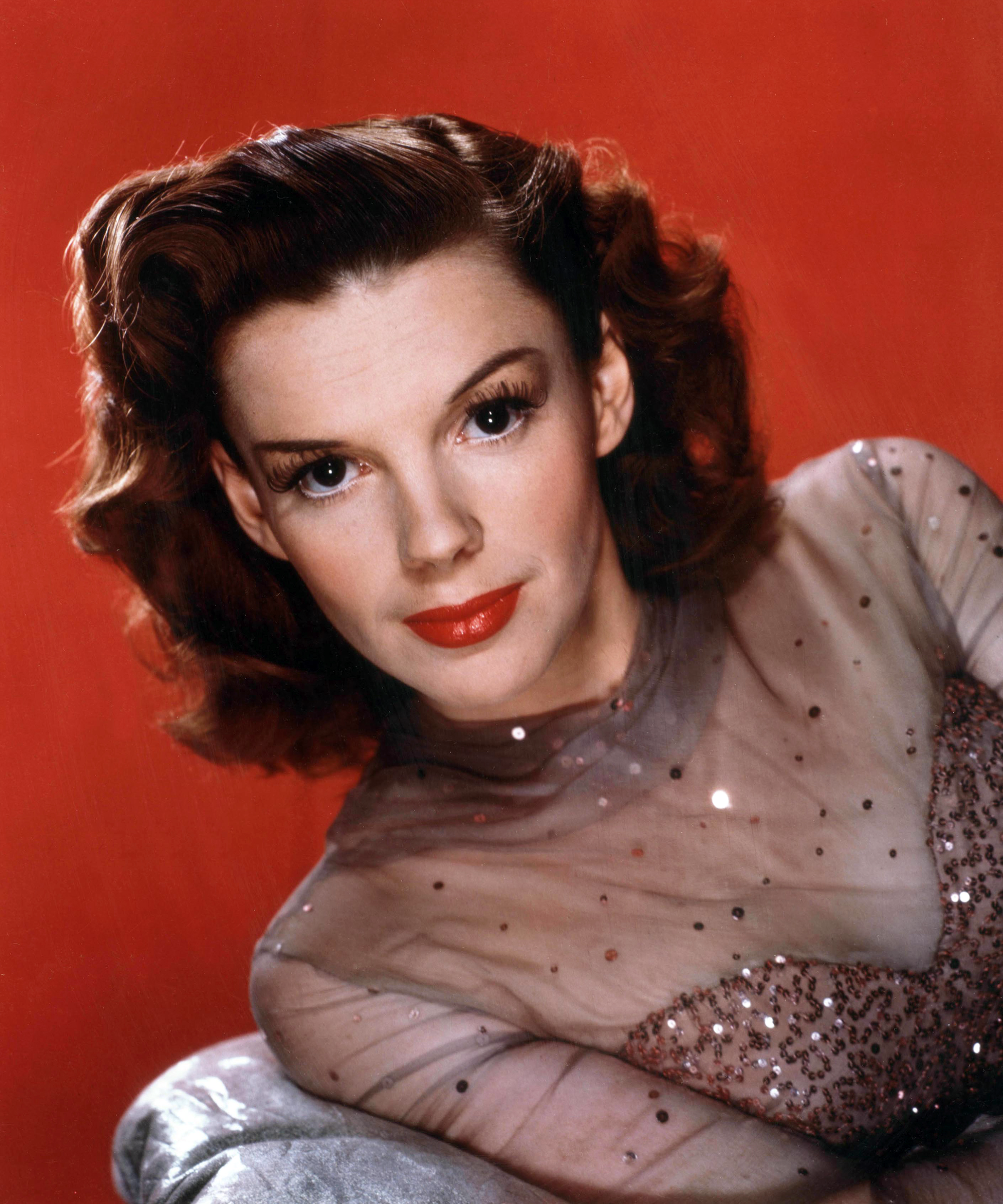
Jinkx Monsoon (left) won on season 7 for her portrayals of Natasha Lyonne (middle) and Judy Garland (right), becoming the fourth contestant (tied with Trinity the Tuck) to win the challenge twice.
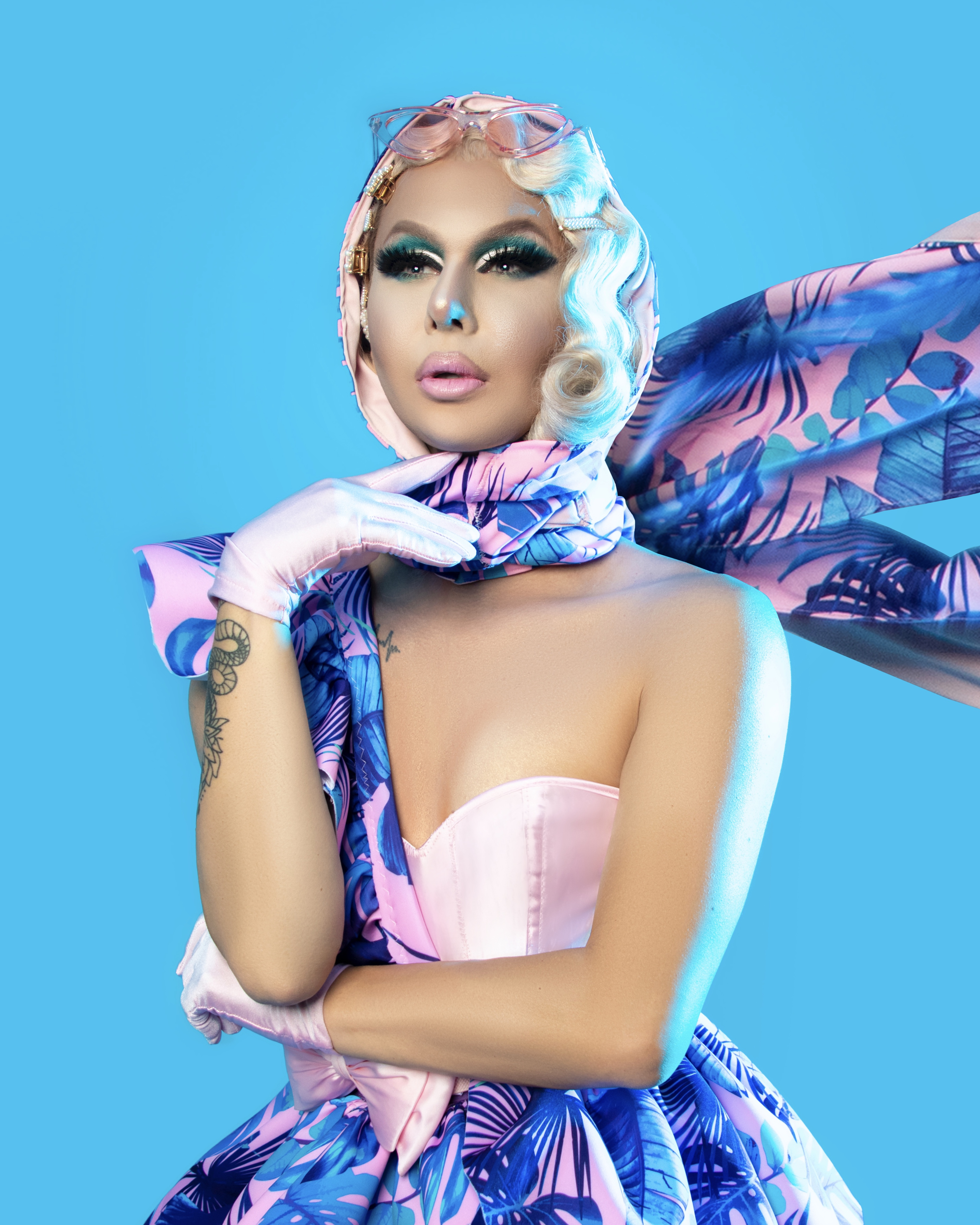
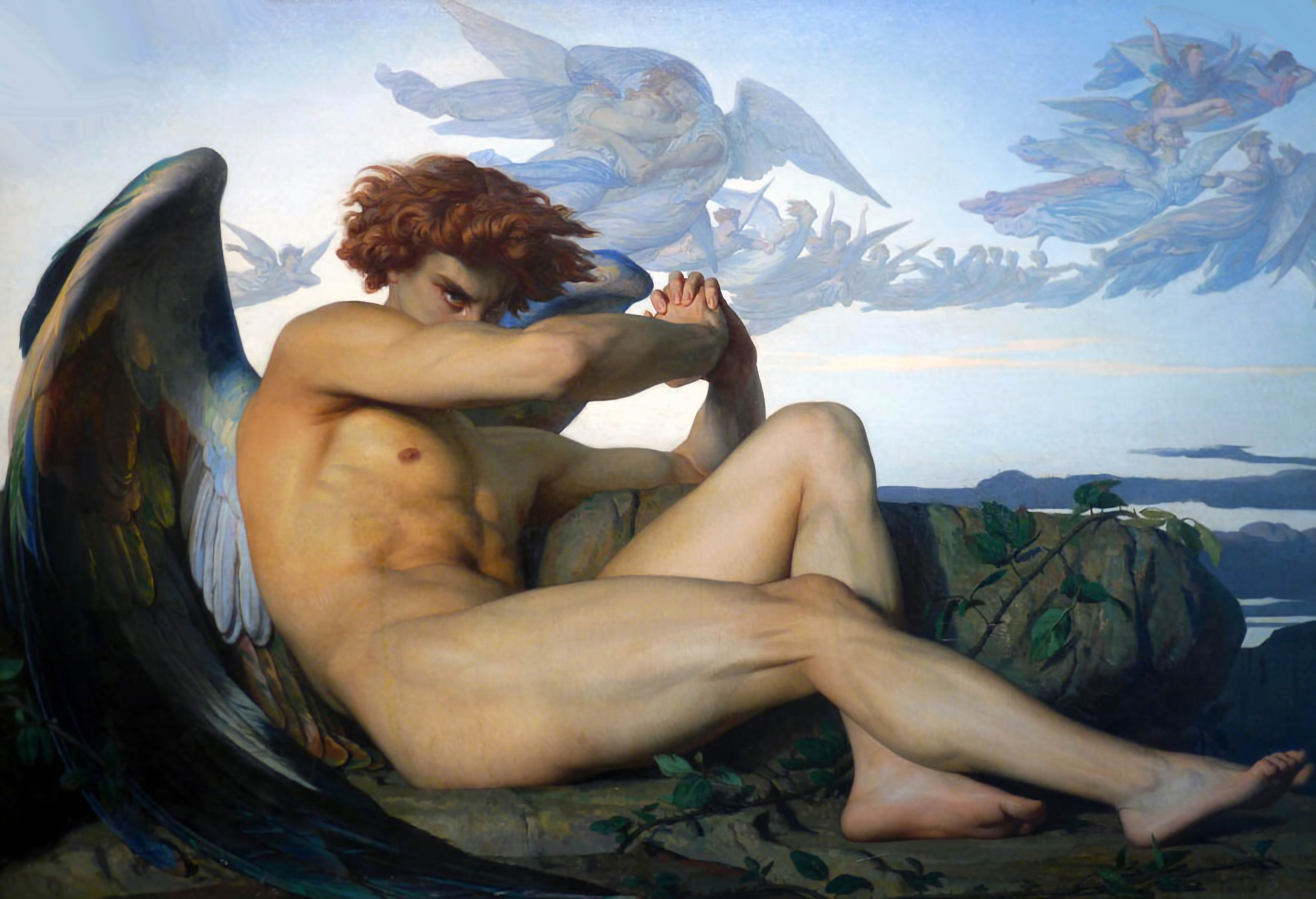
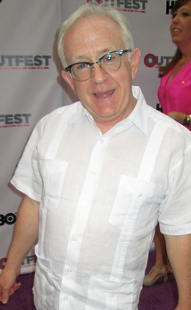
Trinity the Tuck (left) also won on season 7 for her portrayals of Lucifer (middle) and Leslie Jordan (right), becoming the fourth contestant (tied with Jinkx Monsoon) to win the challenge twice.
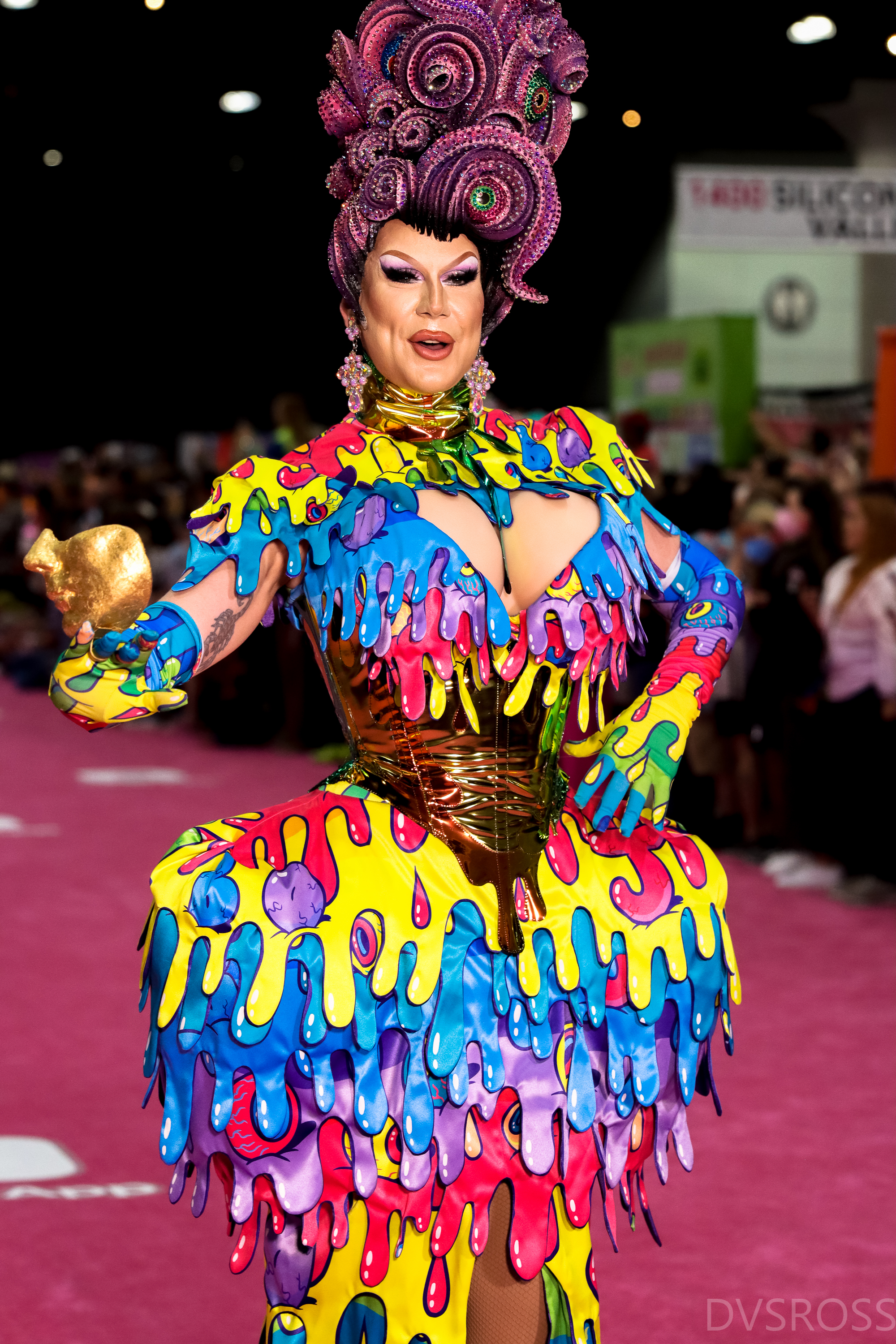
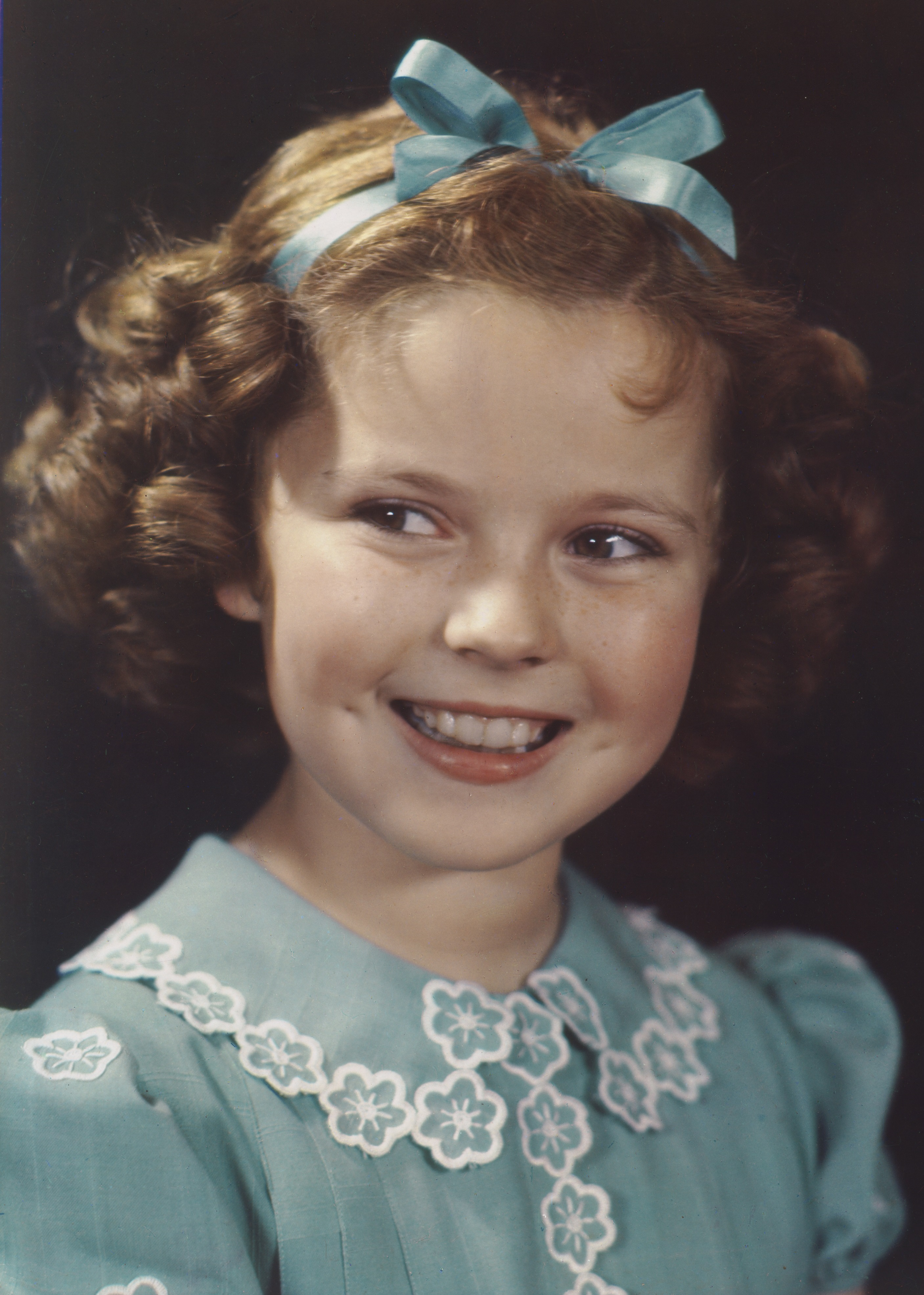
Jimbo (left) won on season 8 for her portrayal of Shirley Temple (right), becoming the sixth contestant to win the challenge twice.
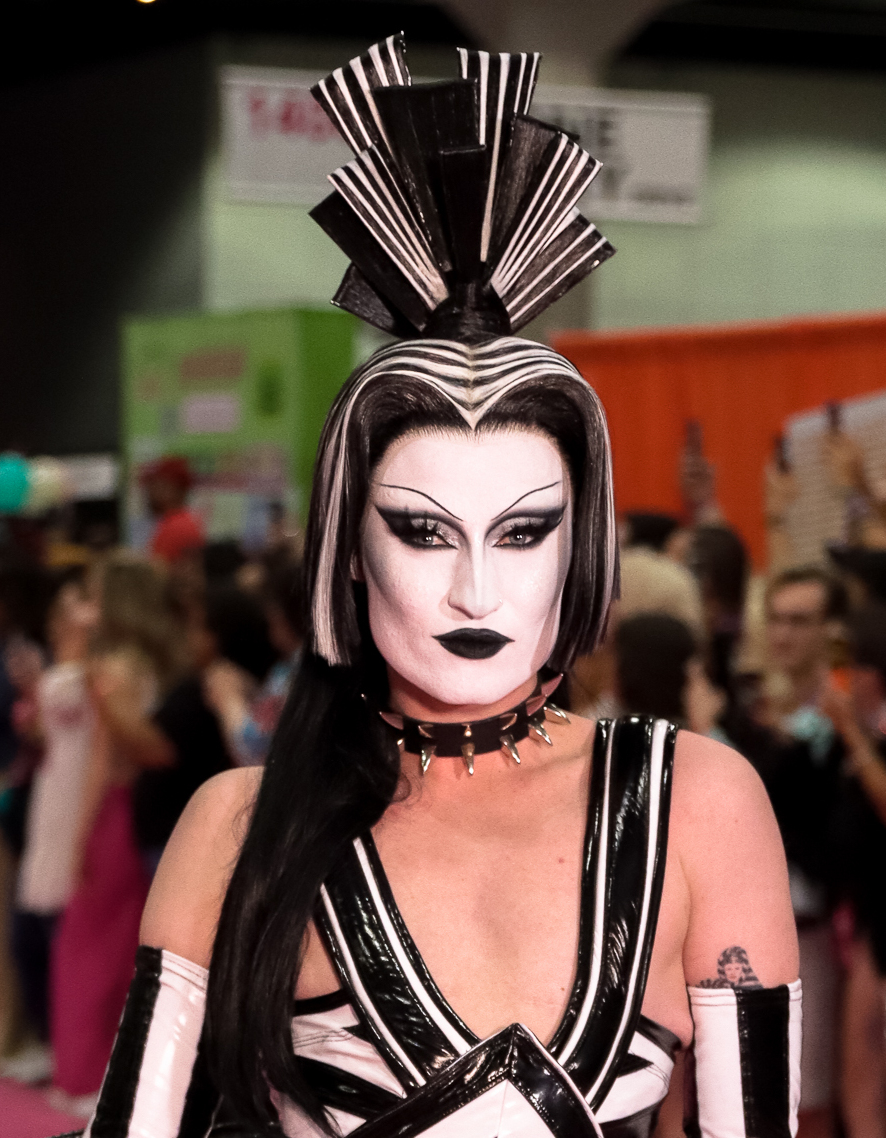
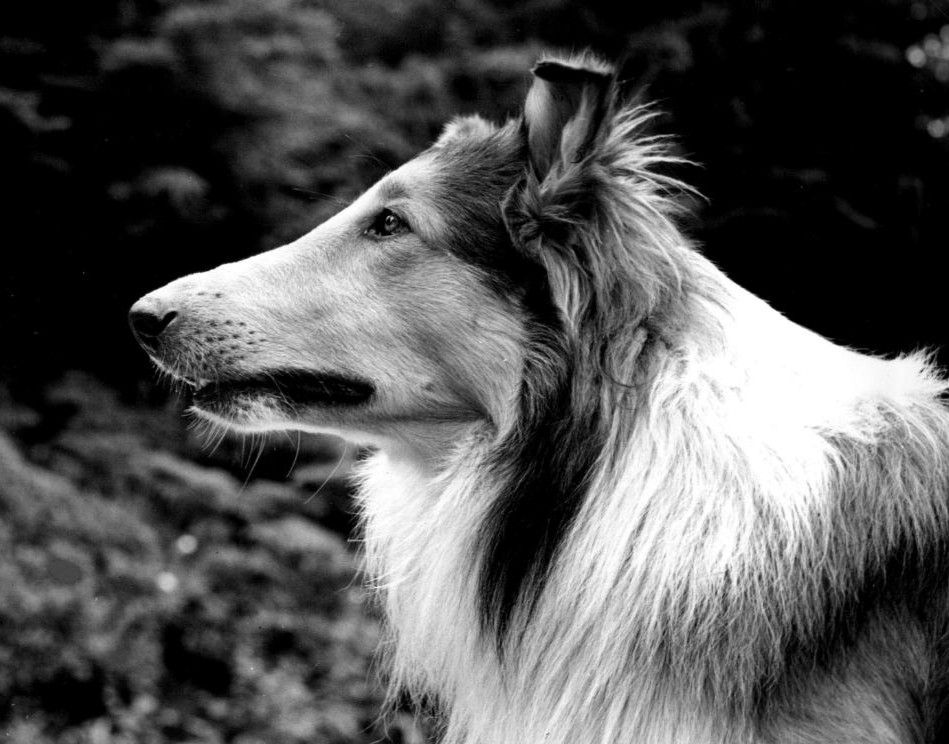
Gottmik (left) won on season 9 for her portrayal of Pal (right), becoming the eighth contestant to win the challenge twice.
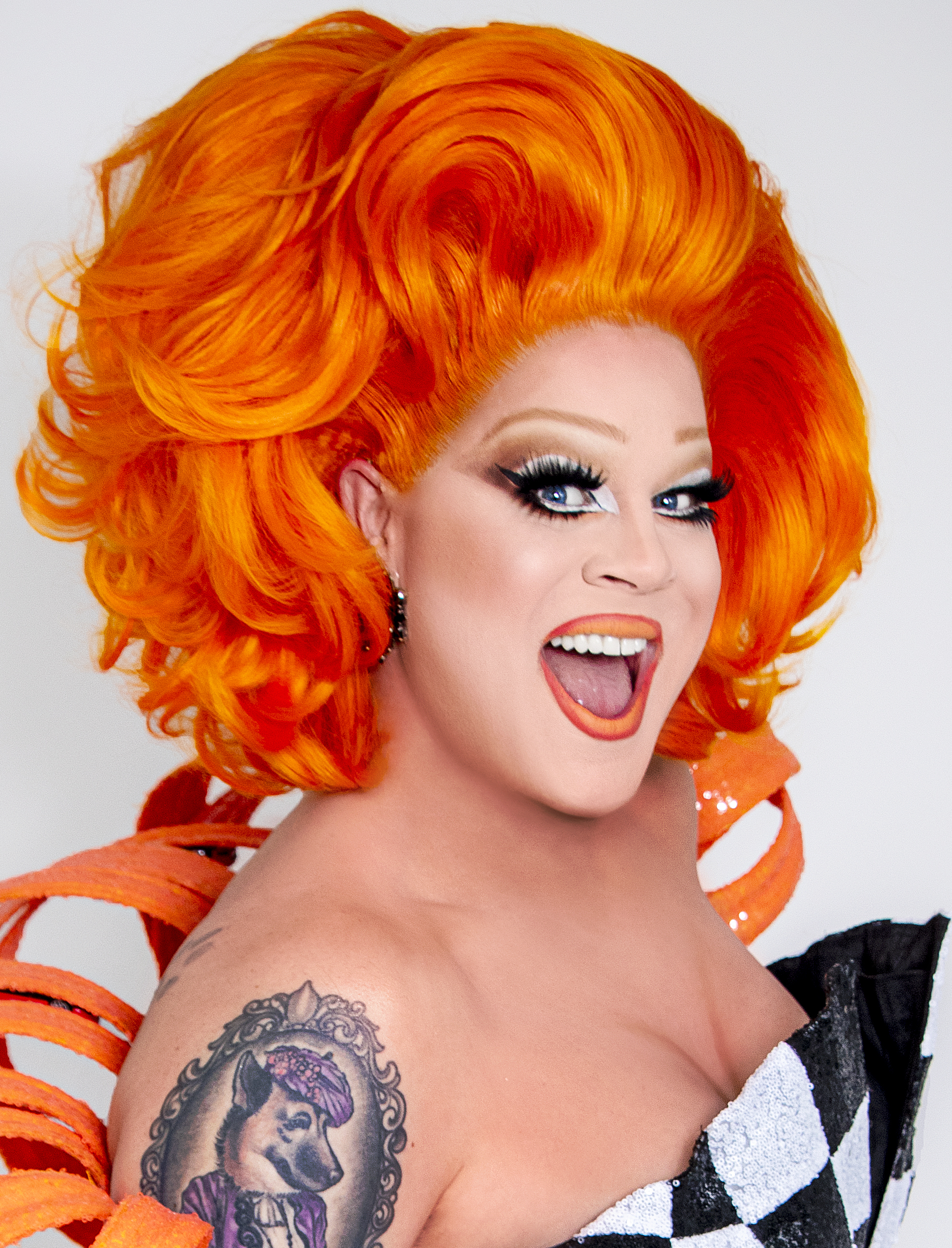
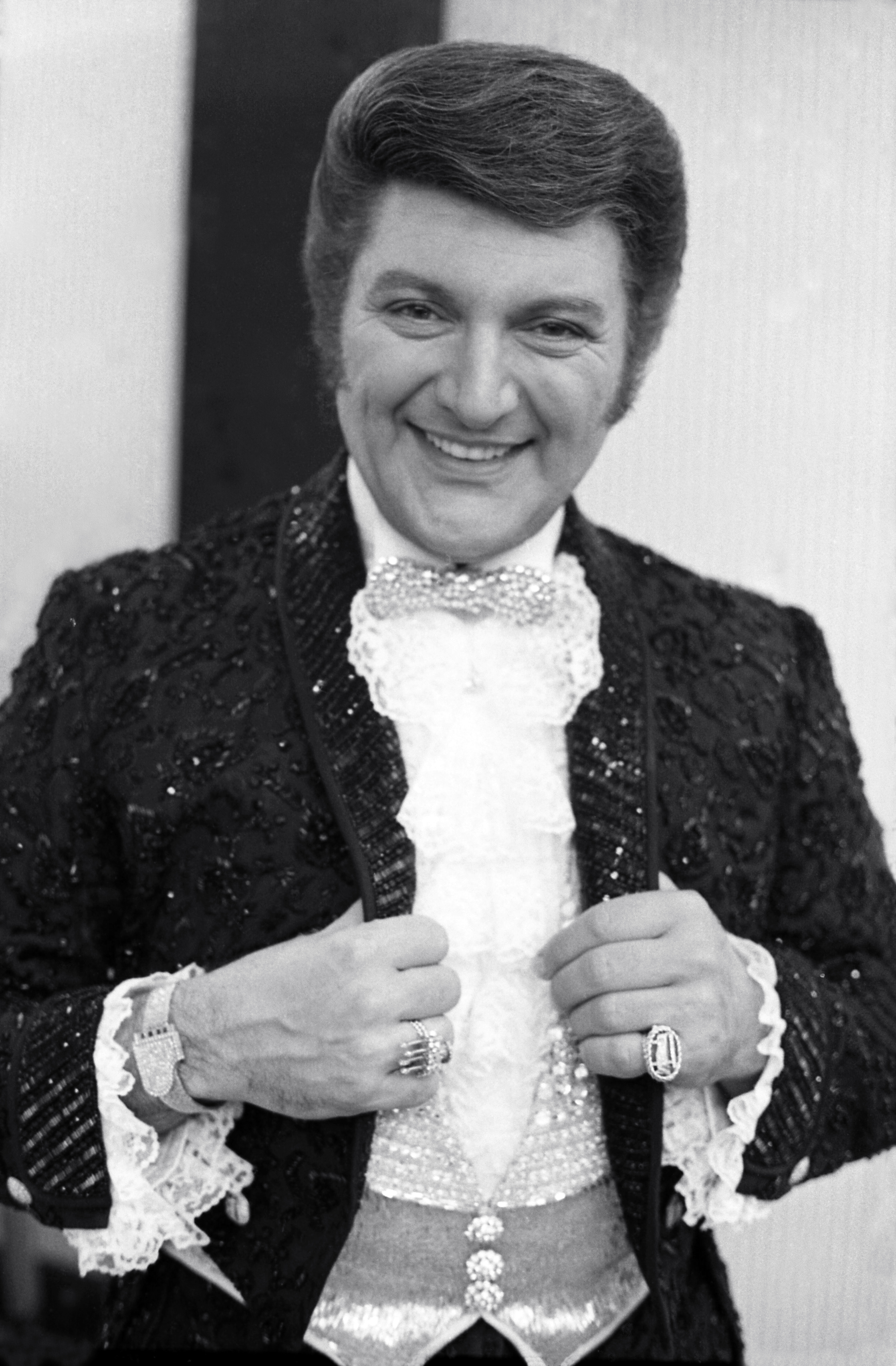
Nina West (left) also won on season 9 for her portrayal of Liberace (right).
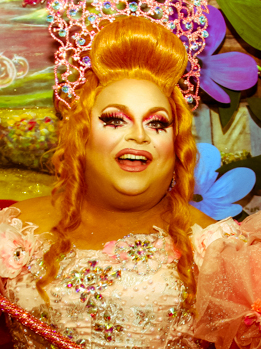
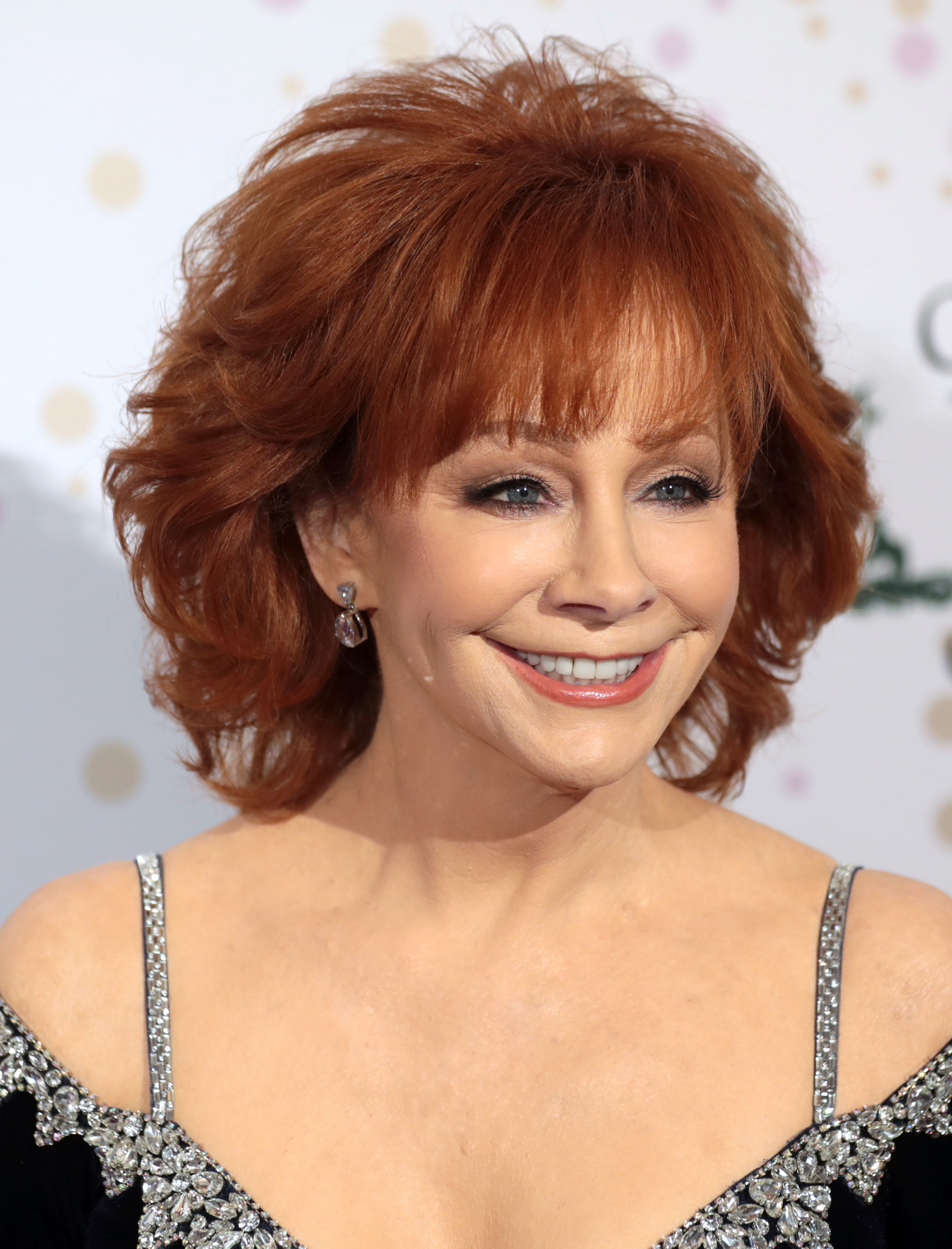
Ginger Minj (left) won on season 10 for her portrayal of Reba McEntire (right), becoming the first contestant to win the challenge three times.

Contestants of RuPaul's Drag Race All Stars and their imitations
Season	Type	Guest celebrities	Contestant	Impersonation	Result
2	—N/a	Jujubee; Raven	Alaska	Mae West	WIN
2	—N/a	Jujubee; Raven	Katya	Björk	TOP2
2	—N/a	Jujubee; Raven	Alyssa Edwards	Joan Crawford	SAFE
2	—N/a	Jujubee; Raven	Ginger Minj	Tammy Faye Messner	SAFE
2	—N/a	Jujubee; Raven	Phi Phi O'Hara	Theresa Caputo	SAFE
2	—N/a	Jujubee; Raven	Detox	Nancy Grace	BTM
2	—N/a	Jujubee; Raven	Roxxxy Andrews	Alaska	BTM
2	—N/a	Jujubee; Raven	Tatianna	Ariana Grande	ELIM
3	—N/a	Carson Kressley; Michelle Visage			
3	—N/a	Carson Kressley; Michelle Visage	BenDeLaCreme	Paul Lynde	WIN
3	—N/a	Carson Kressley; Michelle Visage	Shangela	Jenifer Lewis	WIN
3	—N/a	Carson Kressley; Michelle Visage	Aja	Crystal LaBeija	SAFE
3	—N/a	Carson Kressley; Michelle Visage	BeBe Zahara Benet	Grace Jones	SAFE
3	—N/a	Carson Kressley; Michelle Visage	Kennedy Davenport	Phaedra Parks	BTM
3	—N/a	Carson Kressley; Michelle Visage	Trixie Mattel	RuPaul	BTM
3	—N/a	Carson Kressley; Michelle Visage	Chi Chi DeVayne	Maya Angelou	ELIM
3	—N/a	Carson Kressley; Michelle Visage	Kristin Chenoweth (Note: Kristin Chenoweth joined the contestants as an additional panelist, portraying herself.)		—N/a
4	Snatch Game of Love	Gus Kenworthy	Trinity the Tuck	Caitlyn Jenner	TOP2
4	Snatch Game of Love	Gus Kenworthy	Monét X Change	Whitney Houston	SAFE
4	Snatch Game of Love	Gus Kenworthy	Naomi Smalls	Wendy Williams	SAFE
4	Snatch Game of Love	Gus Kenworthy	Valentina	Eartha Kitt	BTM
4	Snatch Game of Love	Keiynan Lonsdale	Manila Luzon	Barbra Streisand	WIN
4	Snatch Game of Love	Keiynan Lonsdale	Latrice Royale	Della Reese	SAFE
4	Snatch Game of Love	Keiynan Lonsdale	Monique Heart	Tiffany Haddish	SAFE
4	Snatch Game of Love	Keiynan Lonsdale	Gia Gunn	Jenny Bui	ELIM
5	Snatch Game of Love	Tommy Dorfman	Alexis Mateo	Walter Mercado	BTM
5	Snatch Game of Love	Tommy Dorfman	Miz Cracker	Lady Gaga	BTM
5	Snatch Game of Love	Tommy Dorfman	India Ferrah	Jeffree Star	ELIM
5	Snatch Game of Love	Jeffrey Bowyer-Chapman	Shea Couleé	Flavor Flav	WIN
5	Snatch Game of Love	Jeffrey Bowyer-Chapman	Blair St. Clair	Ellen DeGeneres	BTM
5	Snatch Game of Love	Jeffrey Bowyer-Chapman	Jujubee	Eartha Kitt	BTM
6	Snatch Game of Love	Cheyenne Jackson	Ginger Minj	Phyllis Diller	WIN
6	Snatch Game of Love	Cheyenne Jackson	Kylie Sonique Love	Dolly Parton	SAFE
6	Snatch Game of Love	Cheyenne Jackson	Trinity K. Bonet	Whitney Houston	BTM
6	Snatch Game of Love	Fortune Feimster	Eureka!	Divine	SAFE
6	Snatch Game of Love	Fortune Feimster	Ra'Jah O'Hara	La Toya Jackson	SAFE
6	Snatch Game of Love	Fortune Feimster	Pandora Boxx	Kim Cattrall (Note: as Samantha Jones from Sex and the City)	ELIM
7 (Note: As a twist, the contestants were asked to portray two separate celebrities in two separate Snatch Games.)	Snatch Game: Double-Header	Michelle Visage; Ross Mathews	Jinkx Monsoon	Natasha Lyonne	WIN
7	Snatch Game: Double-Header	Michelle Visage; Ross Mathews	Jinkx Monsoon	Judy Garland	WIN
7	Snatch Game: Double-Header	Michelle Visage; Ross Mathews	Trinity the Tuck	Lucifer	TOP2
7	Snatch Game: Double-Header	Michelle Visage; Ross Mathews	Trinity the Tuck	Leslie Jordan	TOP2
7	Snatch Game: Double-Header	Michelle Visage; Ross Mathews	Jaida Essence Hall	Prince	SAFE
7	Snatch Game: Double-Header	Michelle Visage; Ross Mathews	Jaida Essence Hall	The Lady Chablis	SAFE
7	Snatch Game: Double-Header	Michelle Visage; Ross Mathews	Monét X Change	Mike Tyson	SAFE
7	Snatch Game: Double-Header	Michelle Visage; Ross Mathews	Monét X Change	Martin Lawrence (Note: as Sheneneh Jenkins from Martin)	SAFE
7	Snatch Game: Double-Header	Michelle Visage; Ross Mathews	Raja	Madame	SAFE
7	Snatch Game: Double-Header	Michelle Visage; Ross Mathews	Raja	Diana Vreeland	SAFE
7	Snatch Game: Double-Header	Michelle Visage; Ross Mathews	The Vivienne	Joanna Lumley (Note: as Patsy Stone from Absolutely Fabulous)	SAFE
7	Snatch Game: Double-Header	Michelle Visage; Ross Mathews	The Vivienne	Catherine Tate (Note: as Joanie Taylor from The Catherine Tate Show)	SAFE
7	Snatch Game: Double-Header	Michelle Visage; Ross Mathews	Yvie Oddly	Rico Nasty	SAFE
7	Snatch Game: Double-Header	Michelle Visage; Ross Mathews	Yvie Oddly	The Boogieman	SAFE
7	Snatch Game: Double-Header	Michelle Visage; Ross Mathews	Shea Couleé	Elsa Majimbo	BLK
7	Snatch Game: Double-Header	Michelle Visage; Ross Mathews	Shea Couleé	J. Alexander	BLK
8	Snatch Game of Love	Matt Rogers	Jaymes Mansfield	Jennifer Coolidge	SAFE
8	Snatch Game of Love	Matt Rogers	Jessica Wild	Iris Chacón	BTM
8	Snatch Game of Love	Matt Rogers	Kahanna Montrese	Coco Montrese	BTM
8	Snatch Game of Love	Matt Rogers	Heidi N Closet	Blackbeard	QUIT
8	Snatch Game of Love	Bowen Yang	Jimbo	Shirley Temple	WIN
8	Snatch Game of Love	Bowen Yang	Alexis Michelle	Bea Arthur	SAFE
8	Snatch Game of Love	Bowen Yang	Kandy Muse	Renee Graziano	SAFE
8	Snatch Game of Love	Bowen Yang	LaLa Ri	Sukihana	SAFE
9	Snatch Game of Love	Kevin Bertin	Angeria Paris VanMicheals	Marla Gibbs	SAFE
9	Snatch Game of Love	Kevin Bertin	Roxxxy Andrews	Tasha Salad (Note: a fictional character Roxxxy portrayed on RuPaul's Drag Race season 5 and All Stars 2)	SAFE
9	Snatch Game of Love	Kevin Bertin	Shannel	Liberace	SAFE
9	Snatch Game of Love	Kevin Bertin	Jorgeous	John Leguizamo (Note: as Manny the Fanny from Leguizamo's one-man show Mambo Mouth)	CUT
9	Snatch Game of Love	David Petruschin	Gottmik	Pal	WIN
9	Snatch Game of Love	David Petruschin	Nina West	Liberace	TOP2
9	Snatch Game of Love	David Petruschin	Plastique Tiara	Ali Wong	SAFE
9	Snatch Game of Love	David Petruschin	Vanessa Vanjie	Cleopatra	SAFE
10	—N/a	Raja; Raven	Ginger Minj	Reba McEntire	WIN
10	—N/a	Raja; Raven	Aja	Cookie Tookie	SAFE
10	—N/a	Raja; Raven	Bosco	Kenny Kerr	SAFE
10	—N/a	Raja; Raven	Daya Betty	Jane Lynch (Note: as Sue Sylvester from Glee)	SAFE
10	—N/a	Raja; Raven	Irene the Alien	Zsa Zsa Gabor	SAFE
10	—N/a	Raja; Raven	Jorgeous	Pitbull	SAFE
10	—N/a	Raja; Raven	Lydia B Kollins	Pete Burns	SAFE
10	—N/a	Raja; Raven	Mistress Isabelle Brooks	Natalie Nunn	BTM
10	—N/a	Raja; Raven	Cynthia Lee Fontaine	Dracula	ELIM

=== RuPaul's Drag Race Global All Stars ===
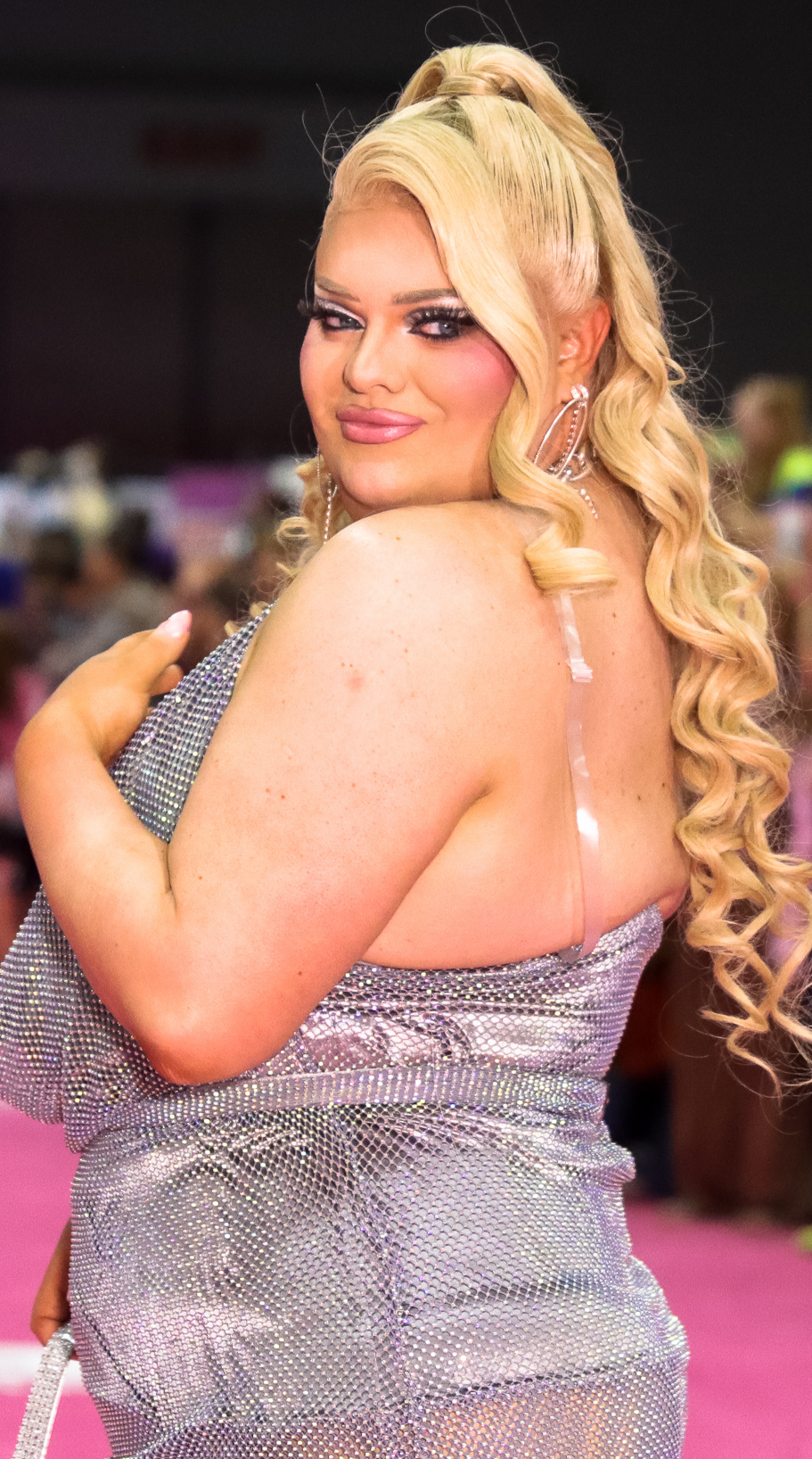
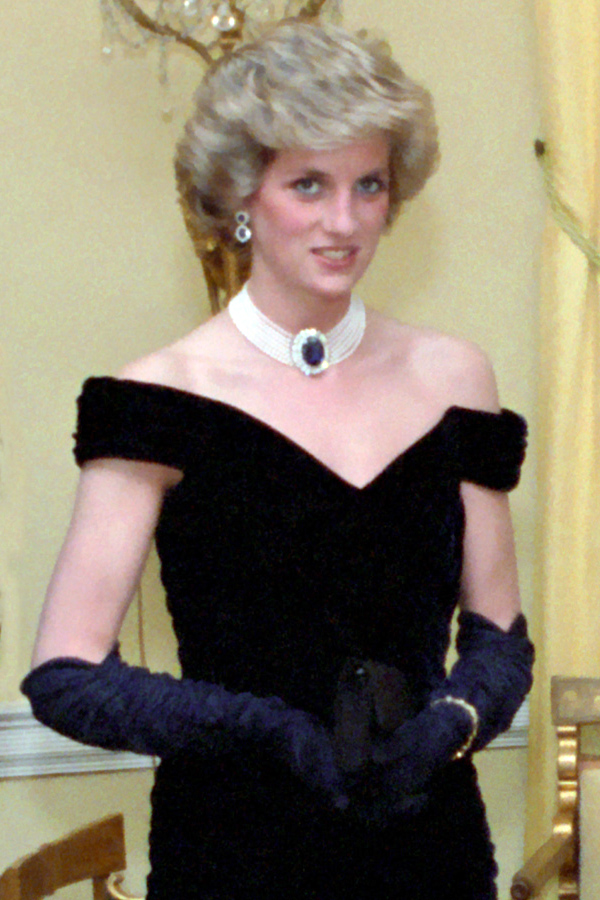
Kitty Scott-Claus (left) won on season 1 for her portrayal of Diana, Princess of Wales (right).

Contestants of RuPaul's Drag Race Global All Stars and their imitations
Season	Type	Guest celebrities	Contestants	Impersonation	Result
1	Snatch Game of Love	Javier Calvo	Kitty Scott-Claus	Diana, Princess of Wales	WIN
1	Snatch Game of Love	Javier Calvo	Kween Kong	King Schlong (Note: a satirical version of King Kong)	SAFE
1	Snatch Game of Love	Javier Calvo	Nehellenia	Valentino	SAFE
1	Snatch Game of Love	Javier Calvo	Gala Varo	Laura León	ELIM
1	Snatch Game of Love	Javier Ambrossi	Alyssa Edwards	Annie Oakley	SAFE
1	Snatch Game of Love	Javier Ambrossi	Pythia	Zeus	SAFE
1	Snatch Game of Love	Javier Ambrossi	Tessa Testicle	Susanne Bartsch	SAFE
1	Snatch Game of Love	Javier Ambrossi	Vanity Vain	Loreen	BTM

=== RuPaul's Secret Celebrity Drag Race ===
Contestants of RuPaul's Secret Celebrity Drag Race and their imitations
Season	Guest celebrities	Celebrity	Drag name	Impersonation	Result
1	Monét X Change; Trixie Mattel	Jordan Connor	Babykins La Roux	Chrissy Teigen	Win
1	Monét X Change; Trixie Mattel	Jermaine Fowler	Miss Mimi Teapot	Kevina Hart (Note: A parodic Kevin Hart's sister)	R-up
1	Monét X Change; Trixie Mattel	Nico Tortorella	Olivette Isyou	Lucille Ball (Note: as Lucille Esmeralda "Lucy" McGillicuddy Ricardo from I Love Lucy)	R-up
1	Monét X Change; Trixie Mattel	Bob the Drag Queen (Note: Bob the Drag Queen joined the contestants as an additional panelist, portraying herself.)			—N/a
2	Brooke Lynn Hytes; Monét X Change	Mark Indelicato	Thirsty Von Trap	Erika Jayne	—N/a
2	Brooke Lynn Hytes; Monét X Change	Tatyana Ali	Chakra 7	Eartha Kitt	—N/a
2	Brooke Lynn Hytes; Monét X Change	AJ McLean	Poppy Love	David Bowie (Note: as Ziggy Stardust from Ziggy Stardust and the Spiders from Mars)	—N/a
2	Brooke Lynn Hytes; Monét X Change	Kevin McHale	Chic-Li-Fay	Celine Dion	—N/a

== International ==
Legend:

WIN indicates that the contestant won the challenge and, for the All Stars format, the Lip Sync for Your Legacy.
TOP2/TOP3 indicates that the contestant won the challenge, but lost the Lip Sync for Your Legacy.
RW (Runway win) indicates that the contestant won the runway challenge.
SAFE indicates that the contestant was declared safe by the judges.
SAVE indicates that the contestant was saved from the bottom.
BTM (Bottom) indicates that the contestant was up for elimination.
ELIM (Eliminated) indicates that the contestant was eliminated.
WEL (Winner eliminated) indicates that although the contestant won the challenge, they were the worst in the runway challenge and were subsequently eliminated.
DISQ (Disqualified) indicates that the contestant was disqualified after losing a lip sync to stay in the competition.

=== Canada's Drag Race ===
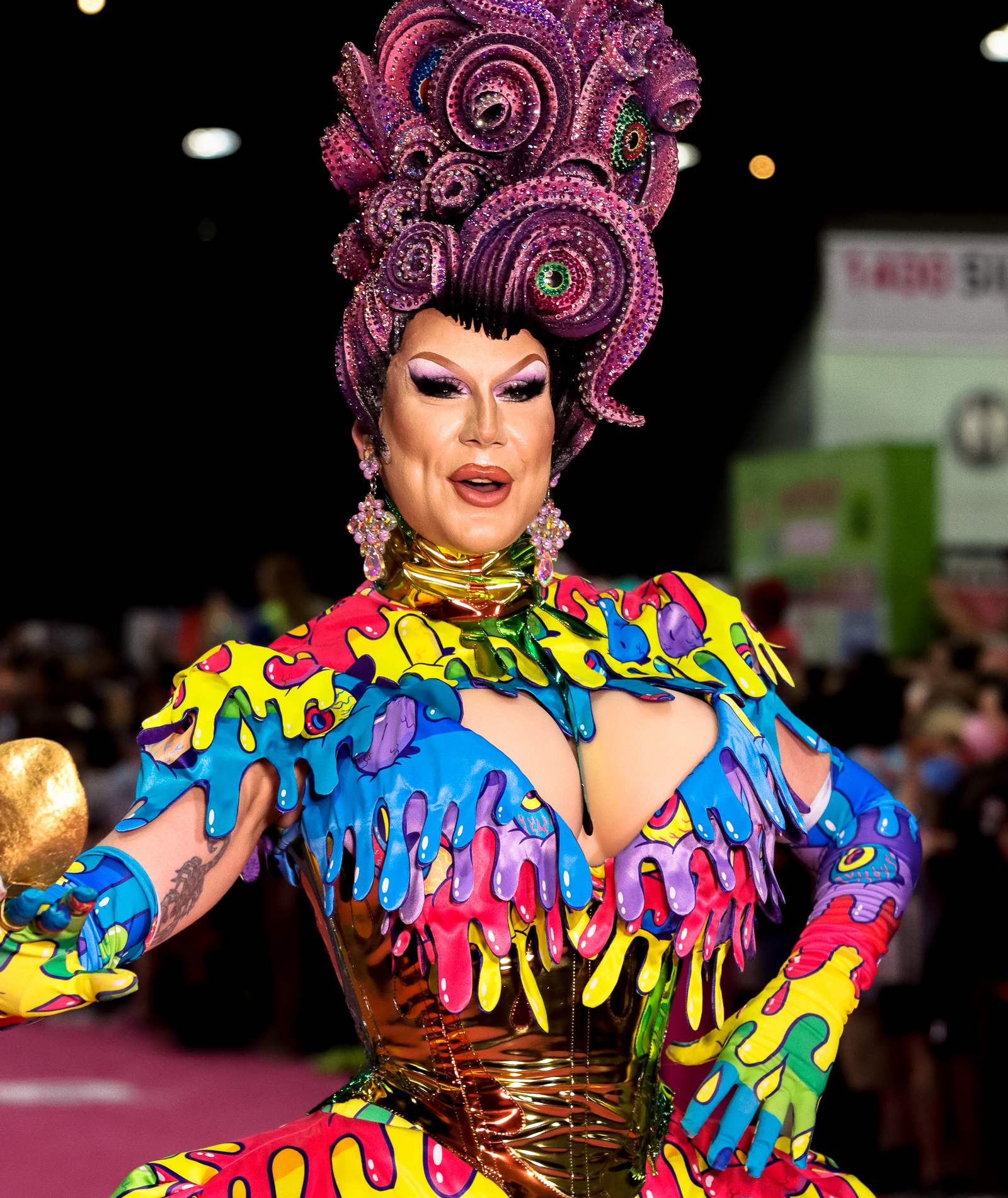
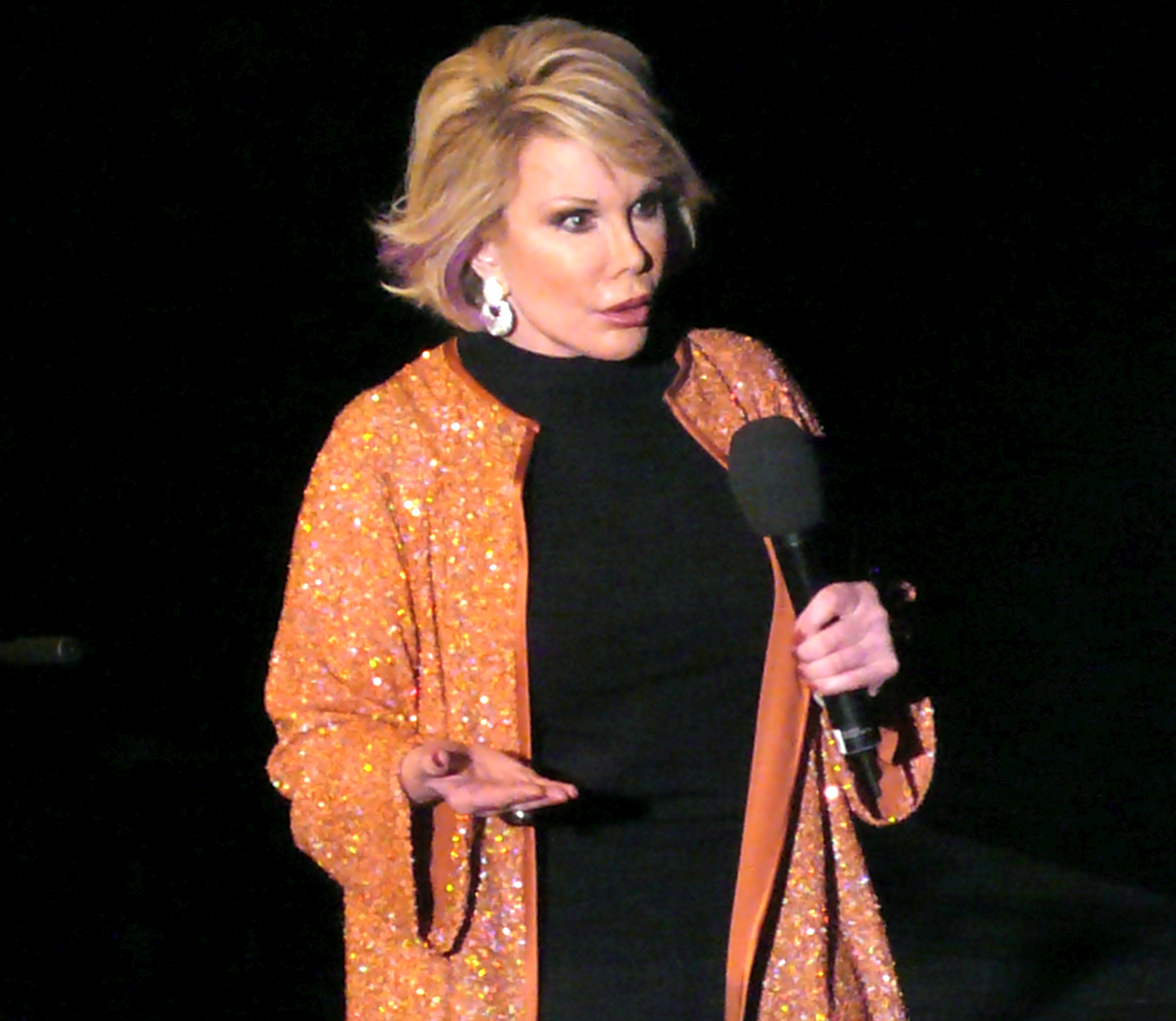
Jimbo (left) won on season 1 for her portrayal of Joan Rivers (right).
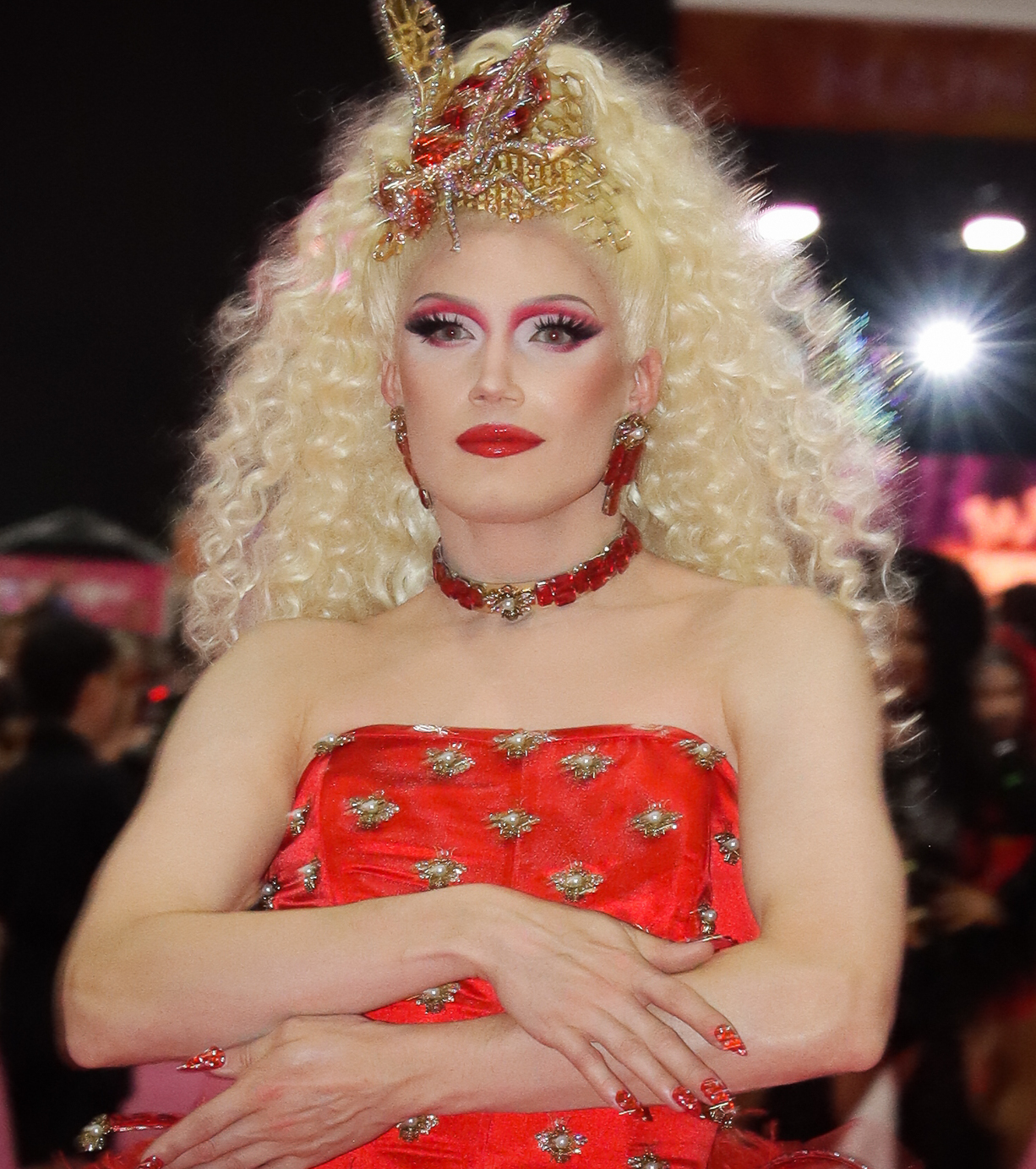
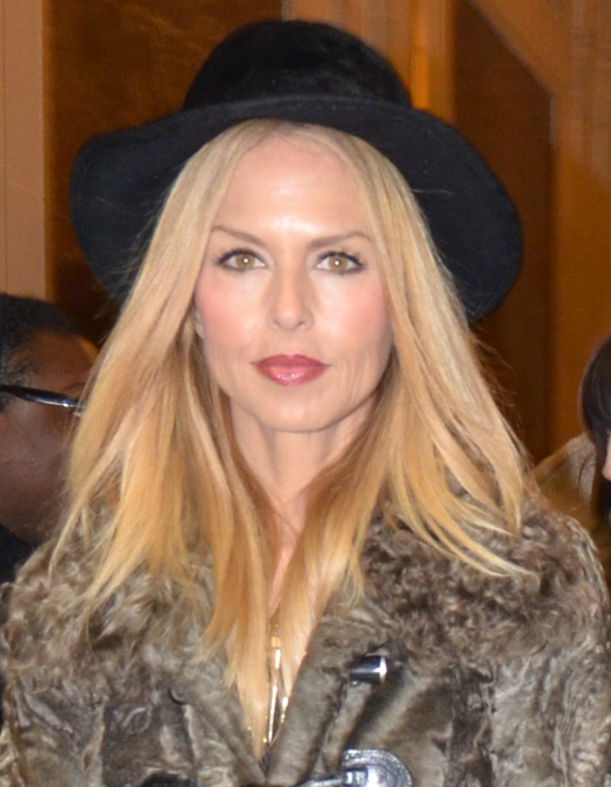
Synthia Kiss (left) won on season 2 for her portrayal of Rachel Zoe (right).
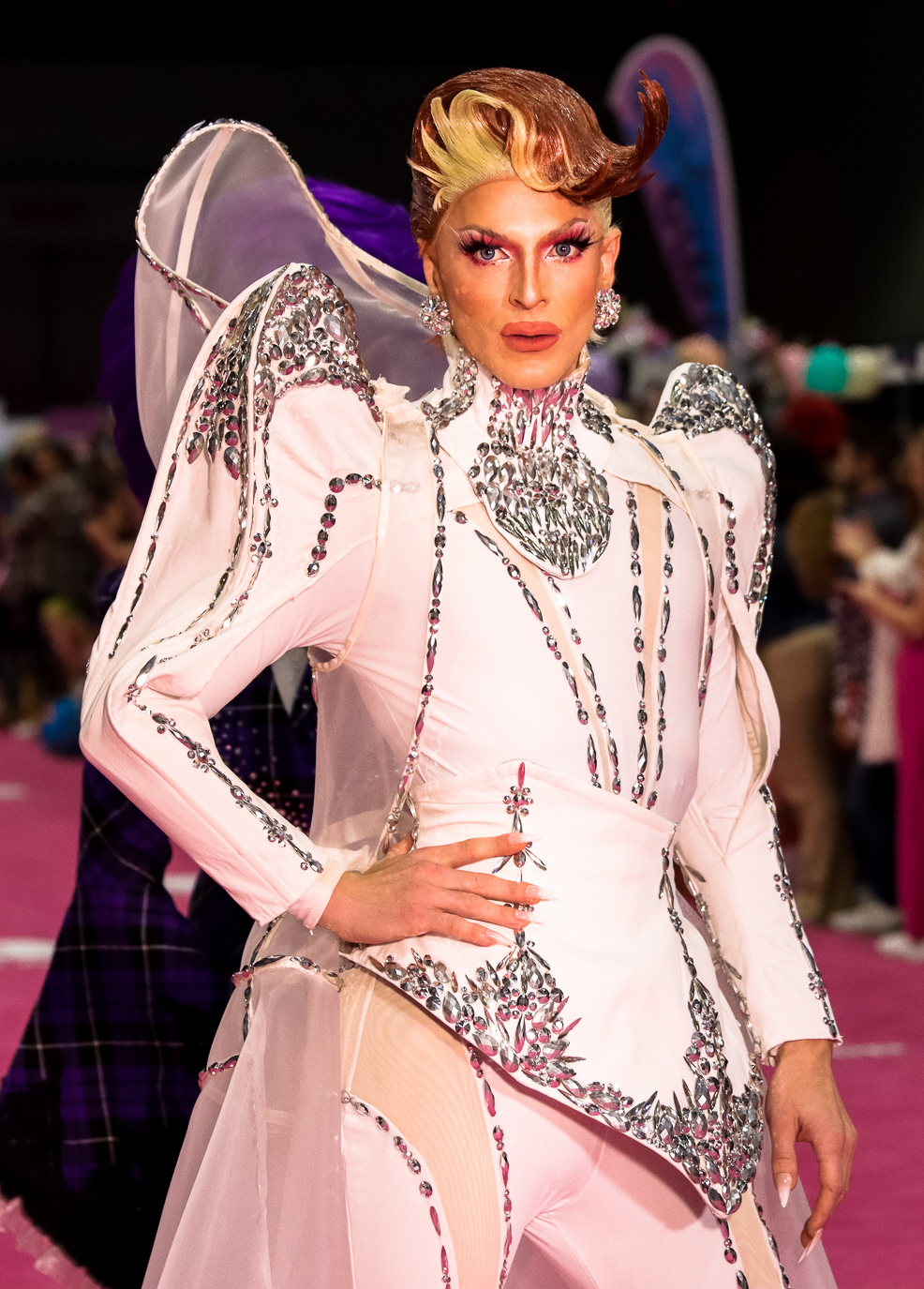
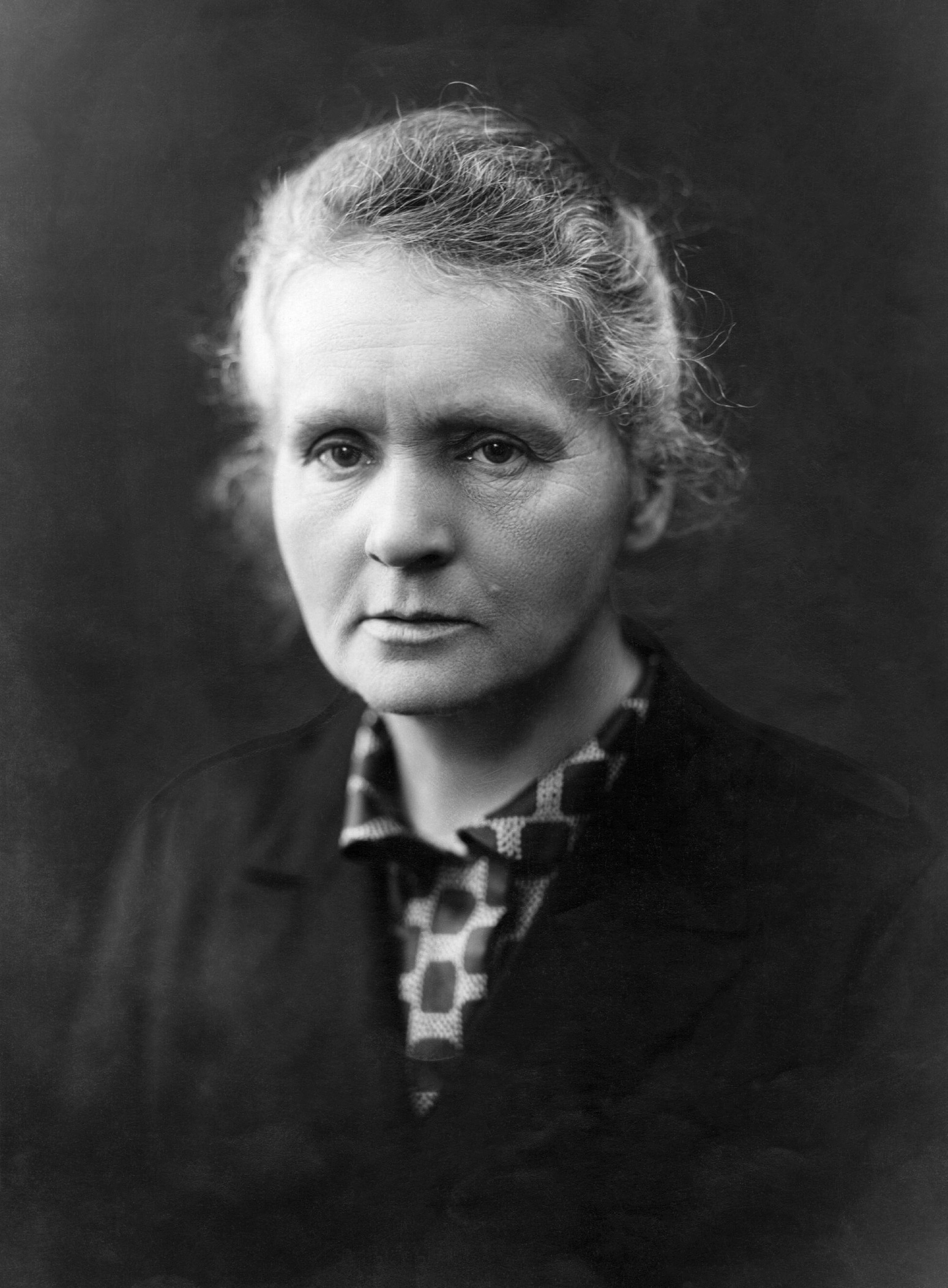
Gisèle Lullaby (left) won on season 3 for her portrayal of Marie Curie (right).
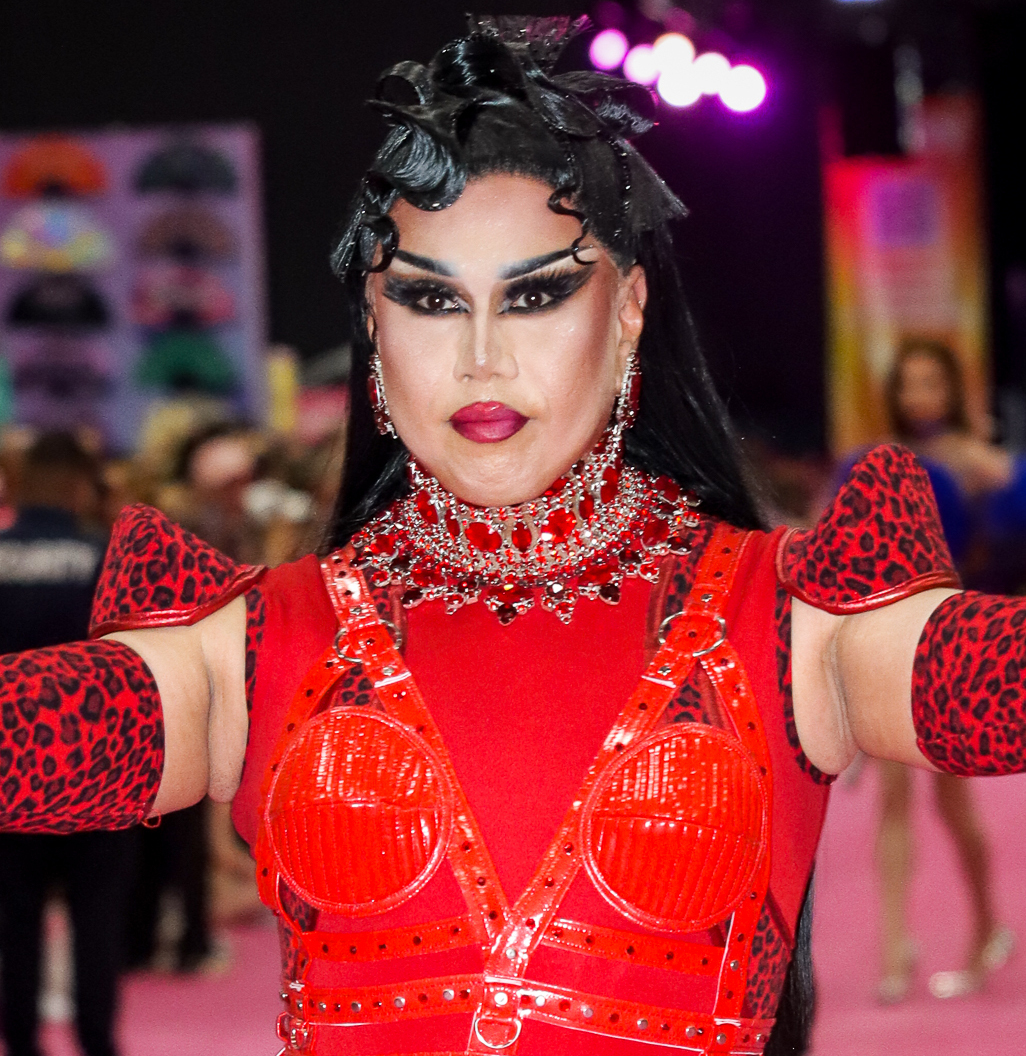
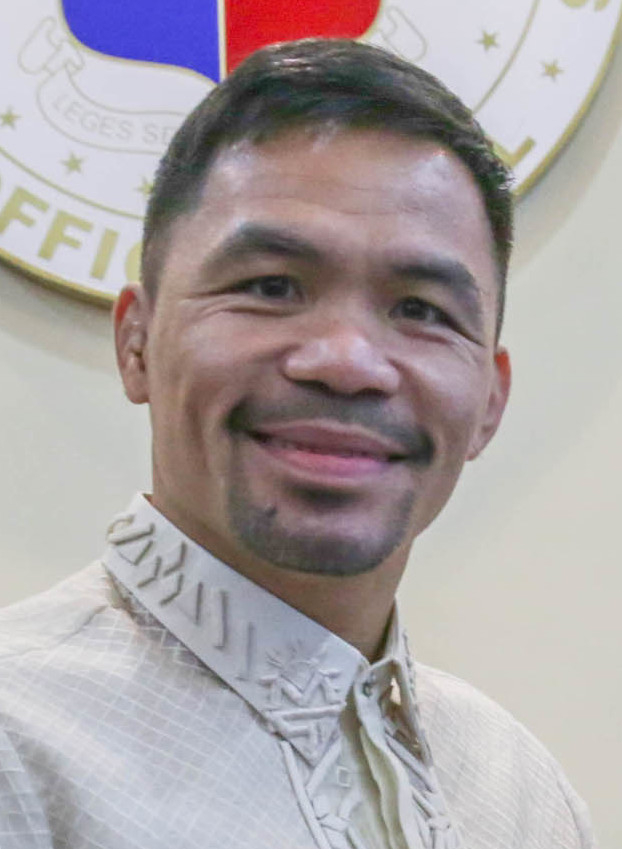
Melinda Verga (left) won on season 4 for her portrayal of Manny Pacquiao (right).

Contestants of Canada's Drag Race and their imitations
Season	Guest celebrities	Contestant	Impersonation	Result
1	Colin McAllister; Justin Ryan	Jimbo	Joan Rivers	WIN
1	Colin McAllister; Justin Ryan	BOA	Gypsy Rose Blanchard	SAFE
1	Colin McAllister; Justin Ryan	Ilona Verley	Rebecca More	SAFE
1	Colin McAllister; Justin Ryan	Lemon	JoJo Siwa	SAFE
1	Colin McAllister; Justin Ryan	Rita Baga	Édith Piaf	SAFE
1	Colin McAllister; Justin Ryan	Scarlett BoBo	Liza Minnelli	SAFE
1	Colin McAllister; Justin Ryan	Priyanka	Miss Cleo	BTM
1	Colin McAllister; Justin Ryan	Kiara	Mariah Carey	ELIM
2	Brad Goreski; Boman "Bomanizer" Martinez-Reid	Synthia Kiss	Rachel Zoe	WIN
2	Brad Goreski; Boman "Bomanizer" Martinez-Reid	Adriana	Sofía Vergara	SAFE
2	Brad Goreski; Boman "Bomanizer" Martinez-Reid	Gia Metric	Jim Carrey (Note: as Ace Ventura from Ace Ventura: Pet Detective)	SAFE
2	Brad Goreski; Boman "Bomanizer" Martinez-Reid	Icesis Couture	La Veneno	SAFE
2	Brad Goreski; Boman "Bomanizer" Martinez-Reid	Kendall Gender	Kris Jenner	SAFE
2	Brad Goreski; Boman "Bomanizer" Martinez-Reid	Kimora Amour	Leslie Jones	SAFE
2	Brad Goreski; Boman "Bomanizer" Martinez-Reid	Pythia	Grimes	SAFE
2	Brad Goreski; Boman "Bomanizer" Martinez-Reid	Eve 6000	Bernie Sanders	BTM
2	Brad Goreski; Boman "Bomanizer" Martinez-Reid	Suki Doll	Yoko Ono	ELIM
3	Brad Goreski; Traci Melchor	Gisèle Lullaby	Marie Curie	WIN
3	Brad Goreski; Traci Melchor	Bombae	Aziz Ansari	SAFE
3	Brad Goreski; Traci Melchor	Miss Fiercalicious	Kourtney Kardashian	SAFE
3	Brad Goreski; Traci Melchor	Irma Gerd	Marilyn Monroe	SAFE
3	Brad Goreski; Traci Melchor	Vivian Vanderpuss	Tammy Faye Messner	SAFE
3	Brad Goreski; Traci Melchor	Jada Shada Hudson	Saucy Santana	SAFE
3	Brad Goreski; Traci Melchor	Kimmy Couture	Ariana Grande	BTM
3	Brad Goreski; Traci Melchor	Lady Boom Boom	Mado Lamotte	ELIM
4	Brad Goreski; Traci Melchor	Melinda Verga	Manny Pacquiao	WIN
4	Brad Goreski; Traci Melchor	Aimee Yonce Shennel	Jesus Christ	SAFE
4	Brad Goreski; Traci Melchor	Denim	Julia Fox	SAFE
4	Brad Goreski; Traci Melchor	Kitten Kaboodle	Jennifer Coolidge	SAFE
4	Brad Goreski; Traci Melchor	Nearah Nuff	Jennifer Coolidge	SAFE
4	Brad Goreski; Traci Melchor	Venus	Joe Exotic	SAFE
4	Brad Goreski; Traci Melchor	Kiki Coe	Elizabeth Taylor	SAVE
4	Brad Goreski; Traci Melchor	Aurora Matrix	Zhao Bing	BTM
4	Brad Goreski; Traci Melchor	Luna DuBois	Mary Cosby	ELIM
5	Brad Goreski; Traci Melchor	Xana	Bettie Page	WIN
5	Brad Goreski; Traci Melchor	Helena Poison	Jennifer Tilly	SAVE
5	Brad Goreski; Traci Melchor	Minhi Wang	Chairman Mao	SAVE
5	Brad Goreski; Traci Melchor	Perla	Mary-Kate Olsen	SAVE
5	Brad Goreski; Traci Melchor	Makayla Couture	Oprah Winfrey	BTM
5	Brad Goreski; Traci Melchor	The Virgo Queen	Judge Lynn Toler	BTM
5	Brad Goreski; Traci Melchor	Uma Gahd	Dee Gruenig	ELIM
6	Icesis Couture (Note: as Donatella Versace); Pythia (Note: as Zeus)	Mya Foxx	Theresa Caputo	WIN
6	Icesis Couture; Pythia	Eboni La'Belle	Keke Palmer	SAFE
6	Icesis Couture; Pythia	Saltina Shaker	Albert Einstein	SAFE
6	Icesis Couture; Pythia	Sami Landri	Marjorie Taylor Greene	SAFE
6	Icesis Couture; Pythia	Velma Jones	Justin Trudeau	SAVE
6	Icesis Couture; Pythia	Karamilk	Flavor Flav	BTM

==== Canada's Drag Race: Canada vs. the World ====
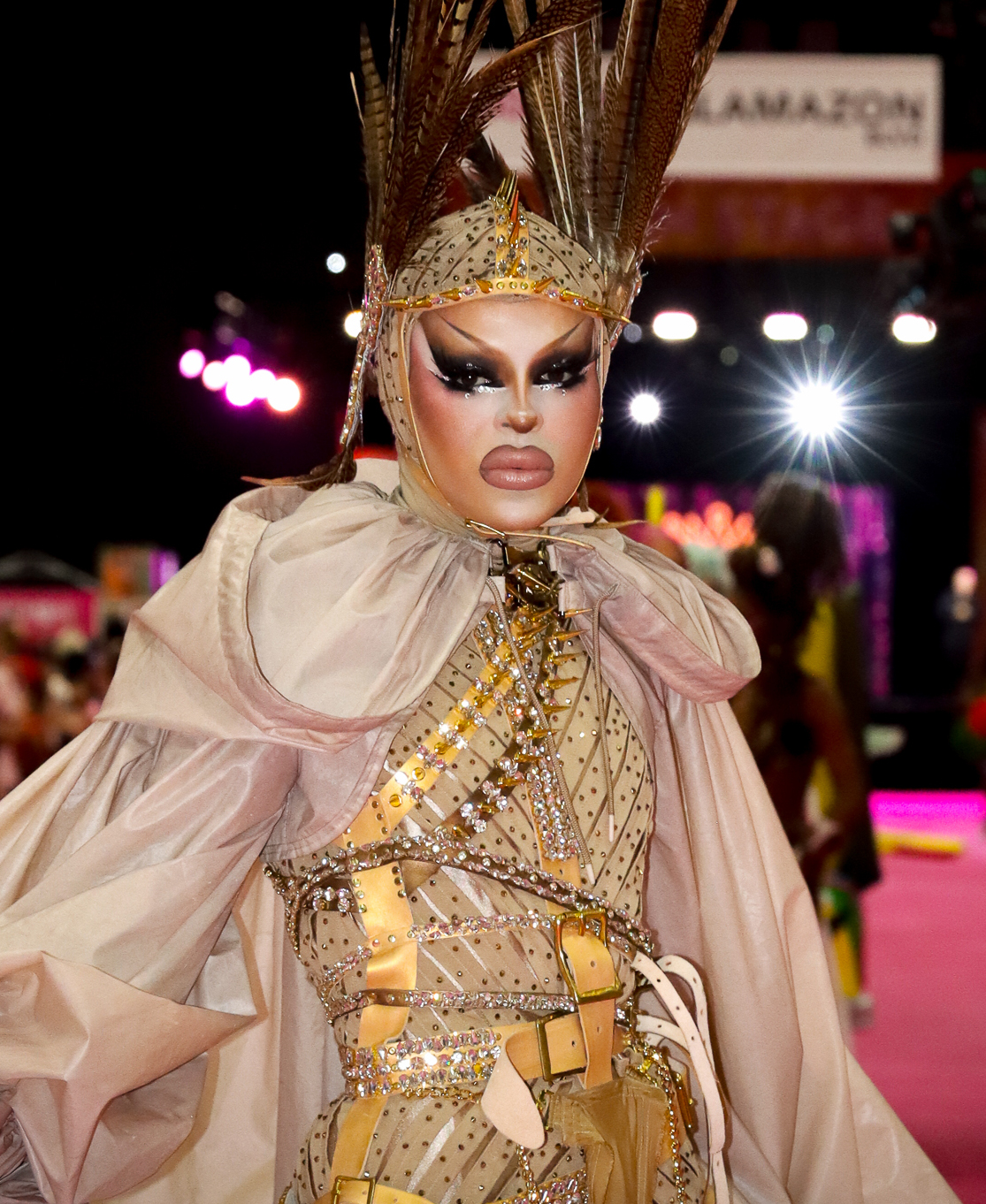
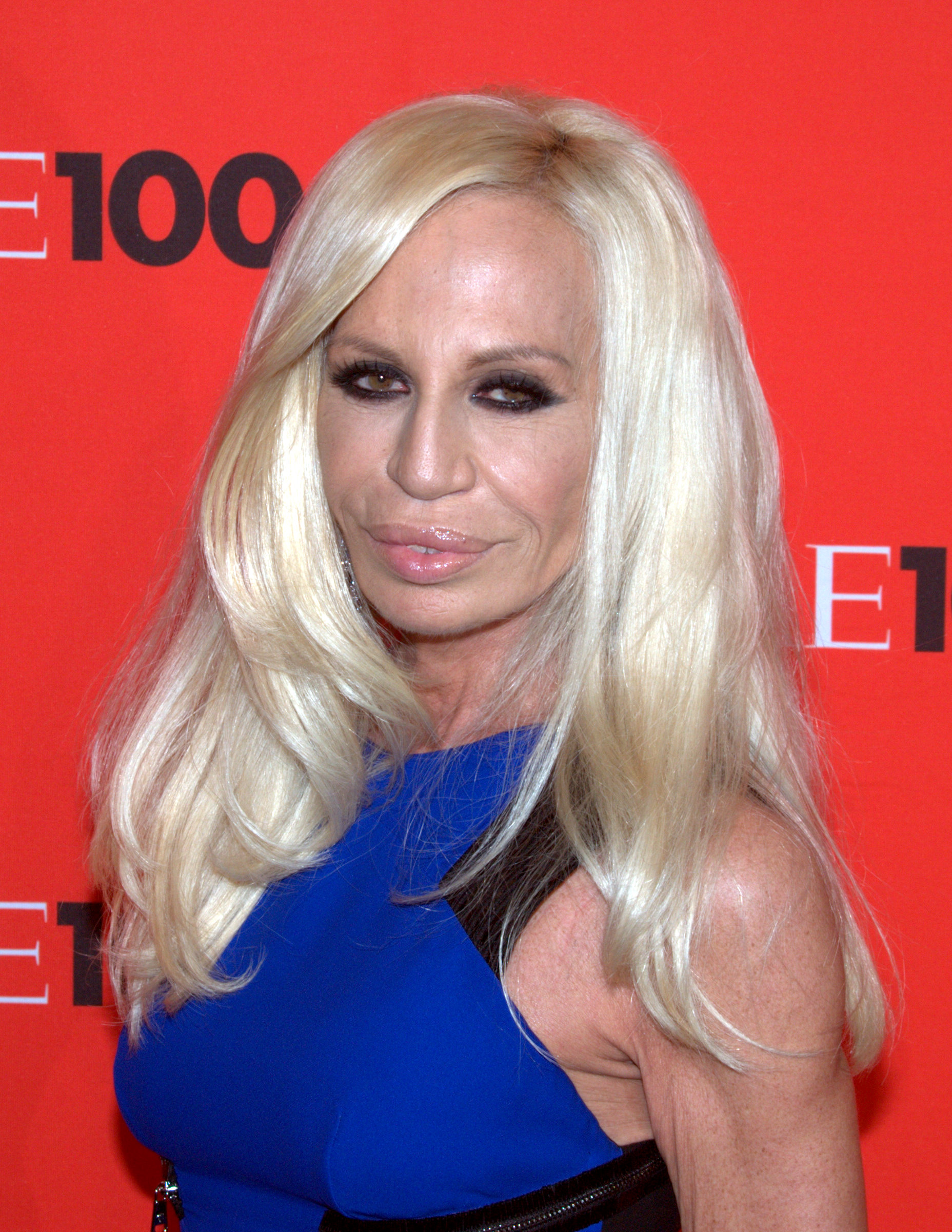
Icesis Couture (left) won on season 1 for her portrayal of Donatella Versace (right).
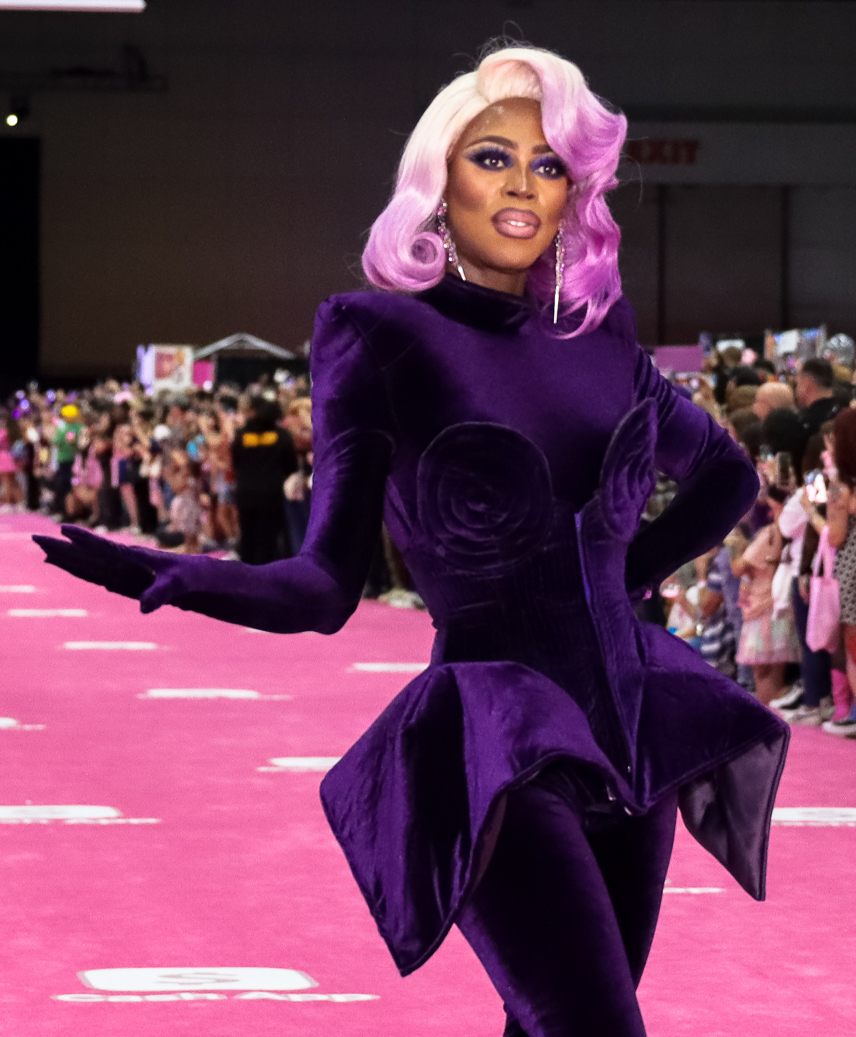
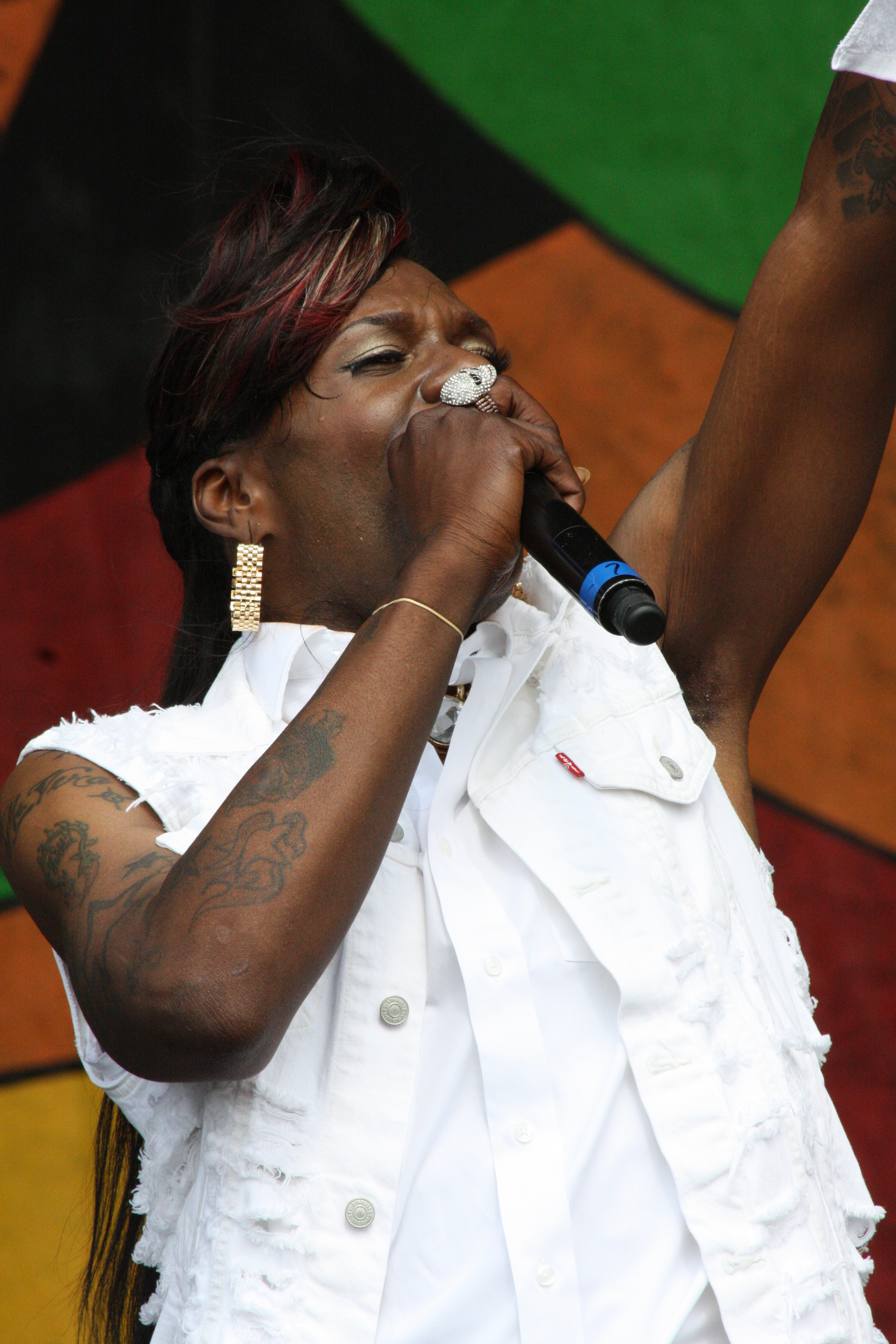
Ra'Jah O'Hara (left) also won on season 1 for her portrayal of Big Freedia (right).
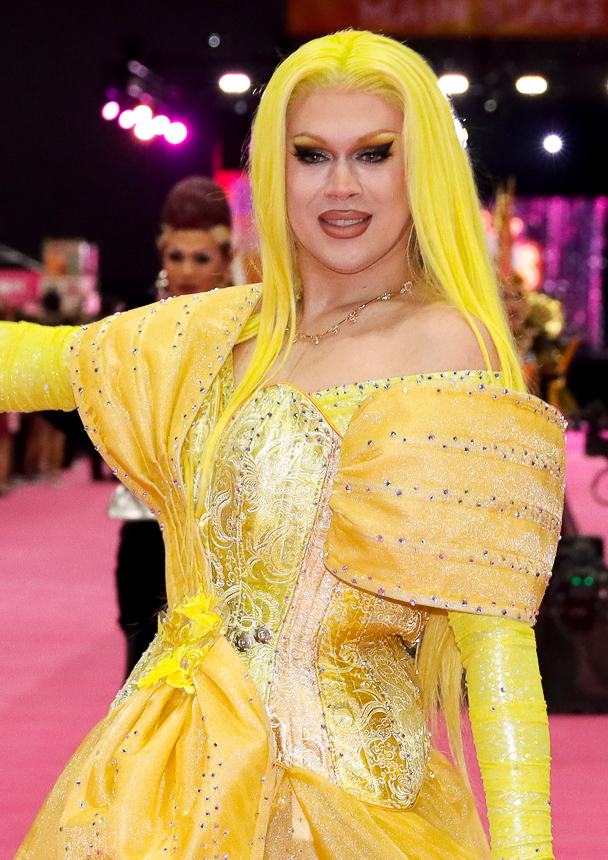
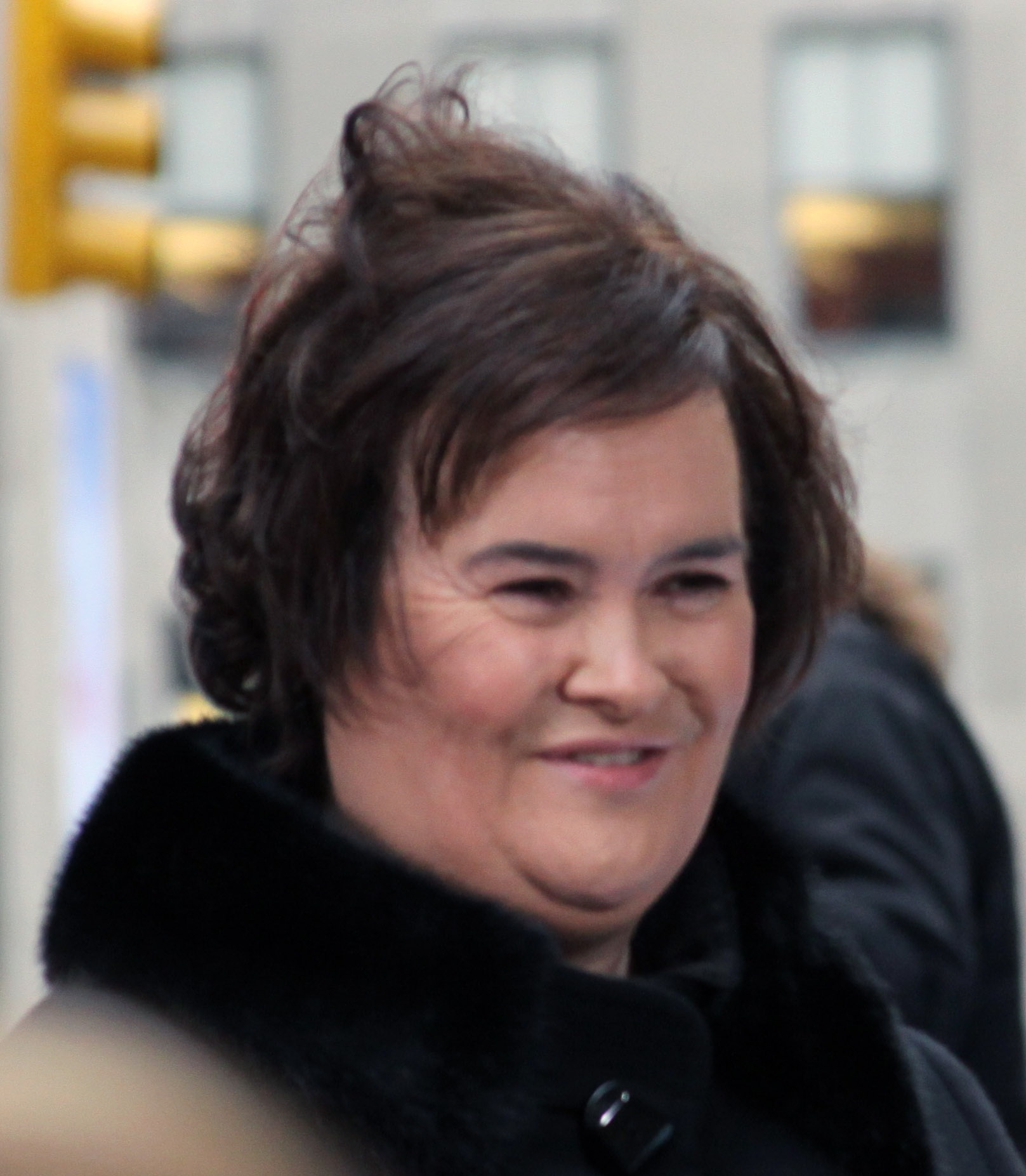
Lemon (left) won on season 2 for her portrayal of Susan Boyle (right).

Contestants of Canada's Drag Race: Canada vs. the World and their imitations
Season	Type	Guest celebrities	Contestant	Impersonation	Result
1	Snatch Summit	Traci Melchor; Sarain Fox	Icesis Couture	Donatella Versace	WIN
1	Snatch Summit	Traci Melchor; Sarain Fox	Ra'Jah O'Hara	Big Freedia	TOP2
1	Snatch Summit	Traci Melchor; Sarain Fox	Rita Baga	Guilda	SAFE
1	Snatch Summit	Traci Melchor; Sarain Fox	Silky Nutmeg Ganache	Lizzo	SAFE
1	Snatch Summit	Traci Melchor; Sarain Fox	Vanity Milan	Spice	SAFE
1	Snatch Summit	Traci Melchor; Sarain Fox	Victoria Scone	Kim Woodburn	SAFE
1	Snatch Summit	Traci Melchor; Sarain Fox	Anita Wigl'it	Adele	BTM
1	Snatch Summit	Traci Melchor; Sarain Fox	Stephanie Prince	Cardi B	ELIM
2	Snatch Game: The Rusical	—N/a	Lemon	Susan Boyle	WIN
2	Snatch Game: The Rusical	—N/a	Cheryl	Queen Victoria	SAFE
2	Snatch Game: The Rusical	—N/a	Kennedy Davenport	Tabitha Brown	SAVE
2	Snatch Game: The Rusical	—N/a	Alexis Mateo	Ron DeSantis (Note: as an infant)	BTM
2	Snatch Game: The Rusical	—N/a	Miss Fiercalicious	Mother Teresa	ELIM

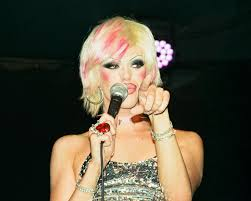
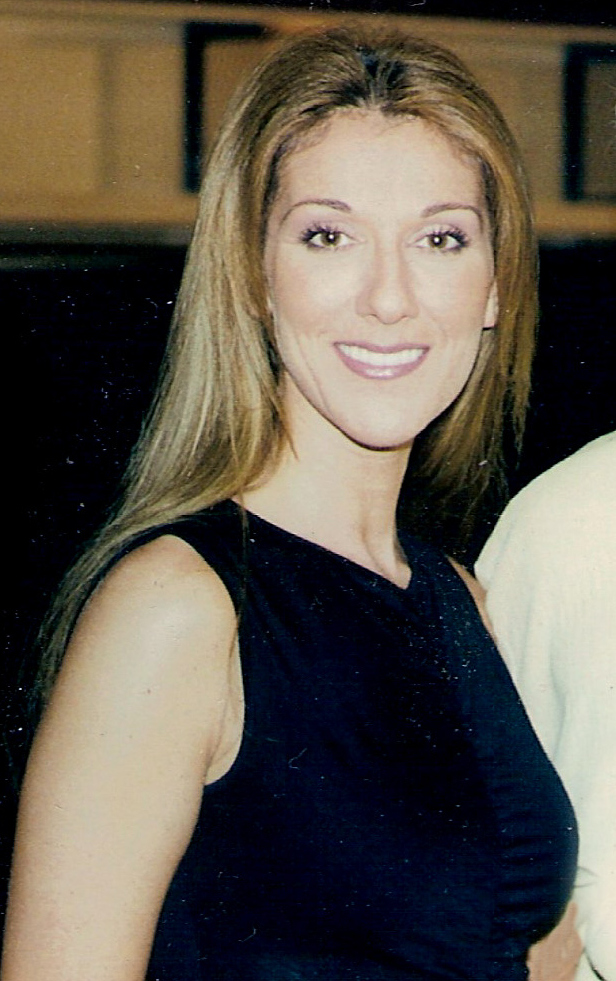
Sami Landri (left) won on All Stars season 1 for her portrayal of Celine Dion (right).

==== Canada's Drag Race All Stars ====
Contestants of Canada's Drag Race All Stars and their imitations
Season	Type	Guest celebrities	Contestant	Impersonation	Result
1	The CUNTest's Snatch Game (Note: As part of the first of four rounds of the Charisma, Uniqueness, Nerve and Talent Contest (CUNTest), no contestant was eliminated. As the winner of the challenge, Sami Landri was exempt from participating in the remaining rounds.)	Jimbo (Note: as Joan Rivers); Priyanka	Sami Landri	Celine Dion	WIN
1	The CUNTest's Snatch Game	Jimbo; Priyanka	Aurora Matrix	Olivia Chow	SAFE
1	The CUNTest's Snatch Game	Jimbo; Priyanka	Jada Shada Hudson	Ts Madison	SAFE
1	The CUNTest's Snatch Game	Jimbo; Priyanka	Nearah Nuff	Connor McDavid	SAFE
1	The CUNTest's Snatch Game	Jimbo; Priyanka	Tiffany Ann Co.	Bretman Rock	SAFE

=== Drag Race Belgique ===
Contestants of Drag Race Belgique and their imitations
Season	Guest celebrities	Contestant	Impersonation	Result
1	Plastic Bertrand; Juriji der Klee	Mademoiselle Boop	Amélie Nothomb	WIN
1	Plastic Bertrand; Juriji der Klee	Athena Sorgelikis	Serge Gainsbourg	SAFE
1	Plastic Bertrand; Juriji der Klee	Drag Couenne	Michel Daerden	SAFE
1	Plastic Bertrand; Juriji der Klee	Susan	Sœur Sourire	SAFE
1	Plastic Bertrand; Juriji der Klee	Peach	Dominique Lehmann	BTM
1	Plastic Bertrand; Juriji der Klee	Valenciaga	Vanessa Paradis	ELIM
2	Cécile Djunga; Charles	Chloe Clarke	Golluma (Note: a parodic Gollum's cousin)	WIN
2	Cécile Djunga; Charles	Alvilda	Anne Dorval (Note: as Criquette Rockwell from Le cœur a ses raisons)	SAFE
2	Cécile Djunga; Charles	Alvilda	"Anne Onimous" (Note: a woman from a La Manif pour tous protest famously mocked on Le Petit Journal)	SAFE
2	Cécile Djunga; Charles	La Veuve	Joan of Arc	SAFE
2	Cécile Djunga; Charles	Loulou Velvet	Yolande Moreau	SAFE
2	Cécile Djunga; Charles	Gabanna	Frida Kahlo	BTM
2	Cécile Djunga; Charles	Star	Little Red Riding Hood	ELIM

=== Drag Race Brasil ===
Contestants of Drag Race Brasil and their imitations
Season	Guest celebrities	Contestant	Impersonation	Result
1	Bruna Braga; Dudu Bertholini	Hellena Malditta	Narcisa Tamborindeguy	WIN
1	Bruna Braga; Dudu Bertholini	Betina Polaroid	Regina Rouca	SAFE
1	Bruna Braga; Dudu Bertholini	Dallas de Vil	Dilma Rousseff	SAFE
1	Bruna Braga; Dudu Bertholini	Miranda Lebrão	Paola Carosella	SAFE
1	Bruna Braga; Dudu Bertholini	Organzza	Maria Bethânia	SAFE
1	Bruna Braga; Dudu Bertholini	Shannon Skarllet	Inês Brasil	SAFE
1	Bruna Braga; Dudu Bertholini	Naza	Márcia Sensitiva	BTM
1	Bruna Braga; Dudu Bertholini	Rubi Ocean	Marília Gabriela	ELIM
2	Dudu Bertholini; Kelly Heelton	DesiRée Beck	Xuxa Verde	WIN
2	Dudu Bertholini; Kelly Heelton	Bhelchi	Maya Massafera	SAFE
2	Dudu Bertholini; Kelly Heelton	Melina Blley	Milton Cunha	SAFE
2	Dudu Bertholini; Kelly Heelton	Mellody Queen	Karol Conká	SAFE
2	Dudu Bertholini; Kelly Heelton	Poseidon Drag	Júlia	SAFE
2	Dudu Bertholini; Kelly Heelton	Ruby Nox	Clodovil Hernandes	SAFE
2	Dudu Bertholini; Kelly Heelton	Adora Black	Linn da Quebrada	BTM
2	Dudu Bertholini; Kelly Heelton	Mercedez Vulcão	Elke Maravilha	ELIM

=== RuPaul's Drag Race Down Under ===
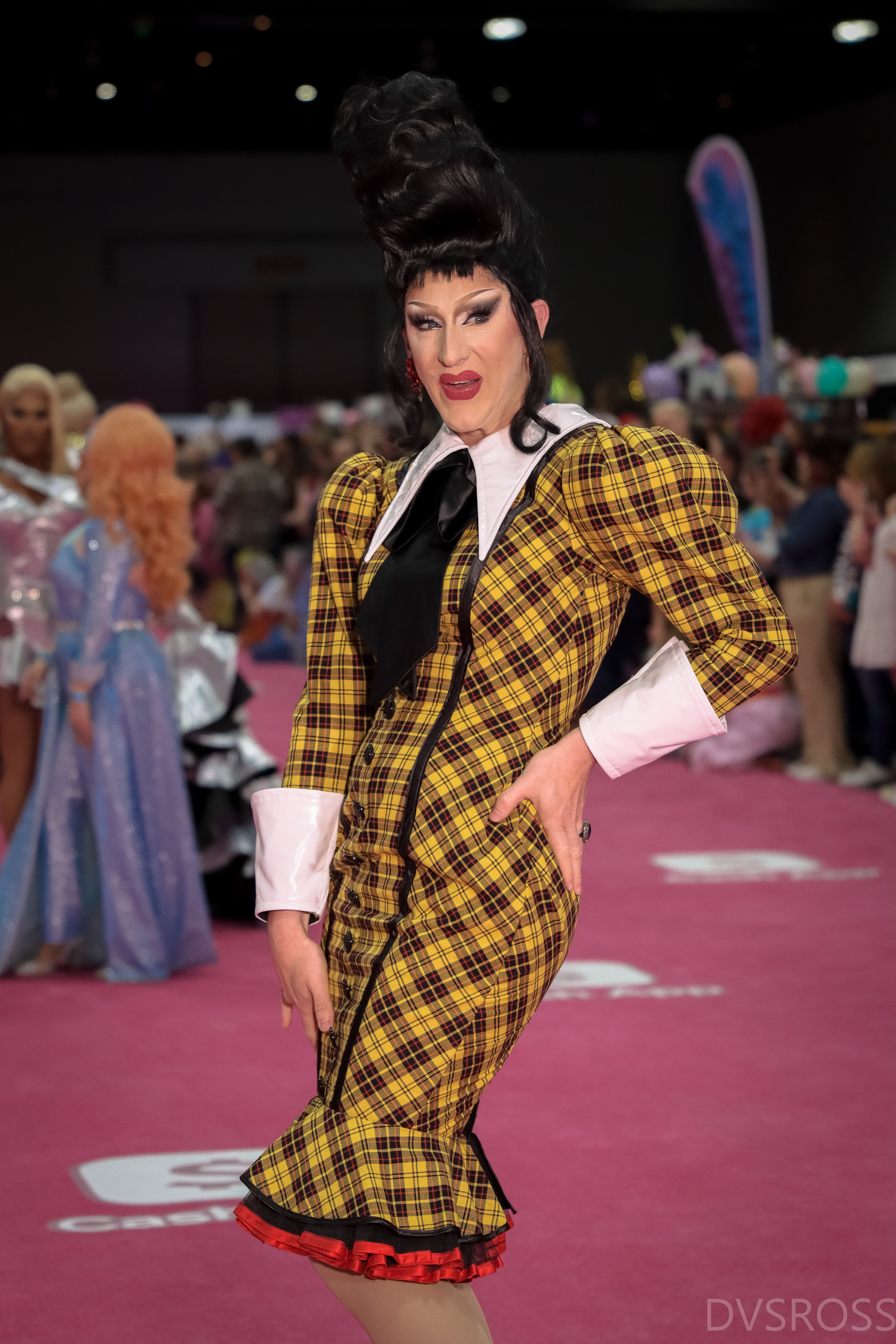
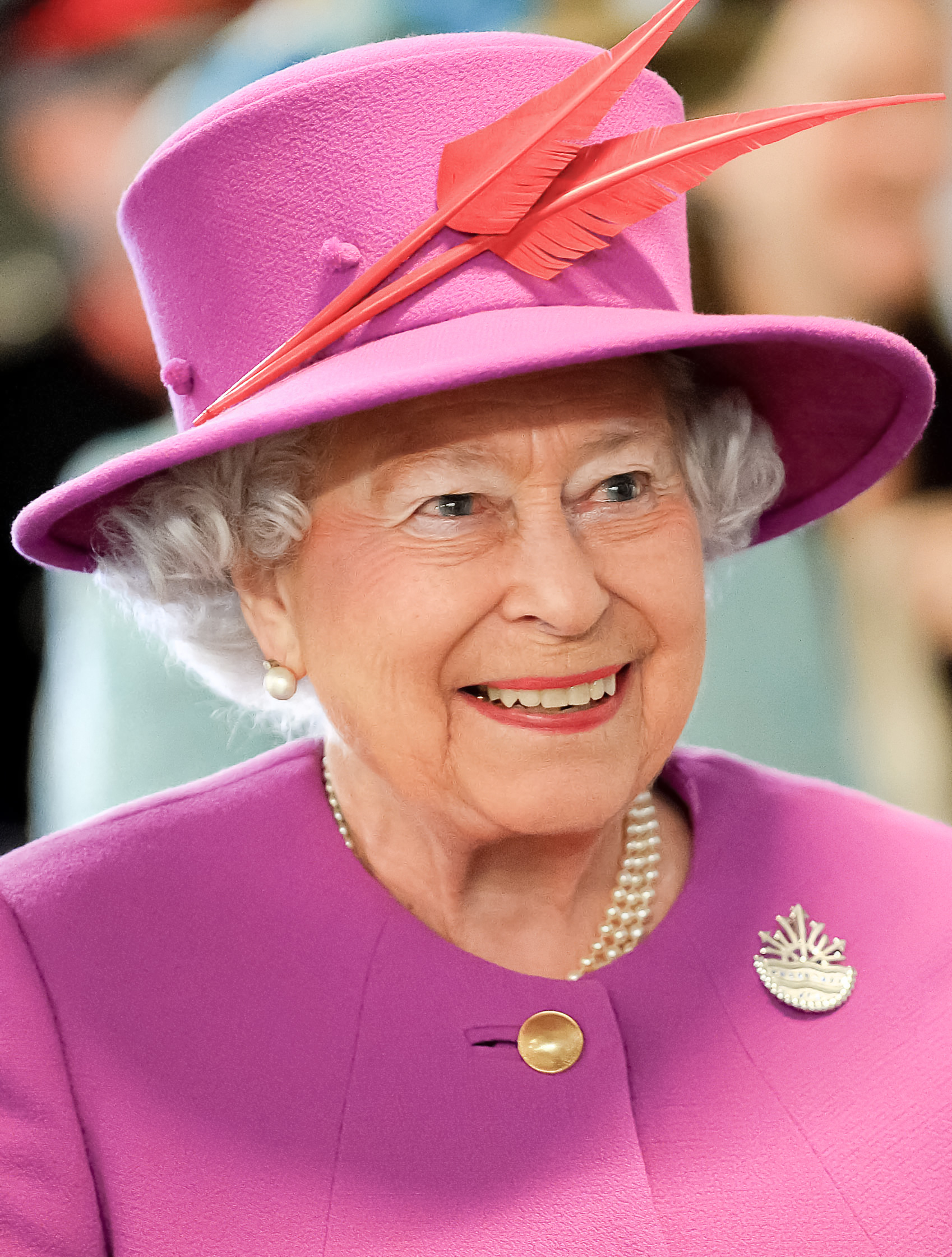
Anita Wigl'it (left) won on season 1 for her portrayal of Queen Elizabeth II (right).
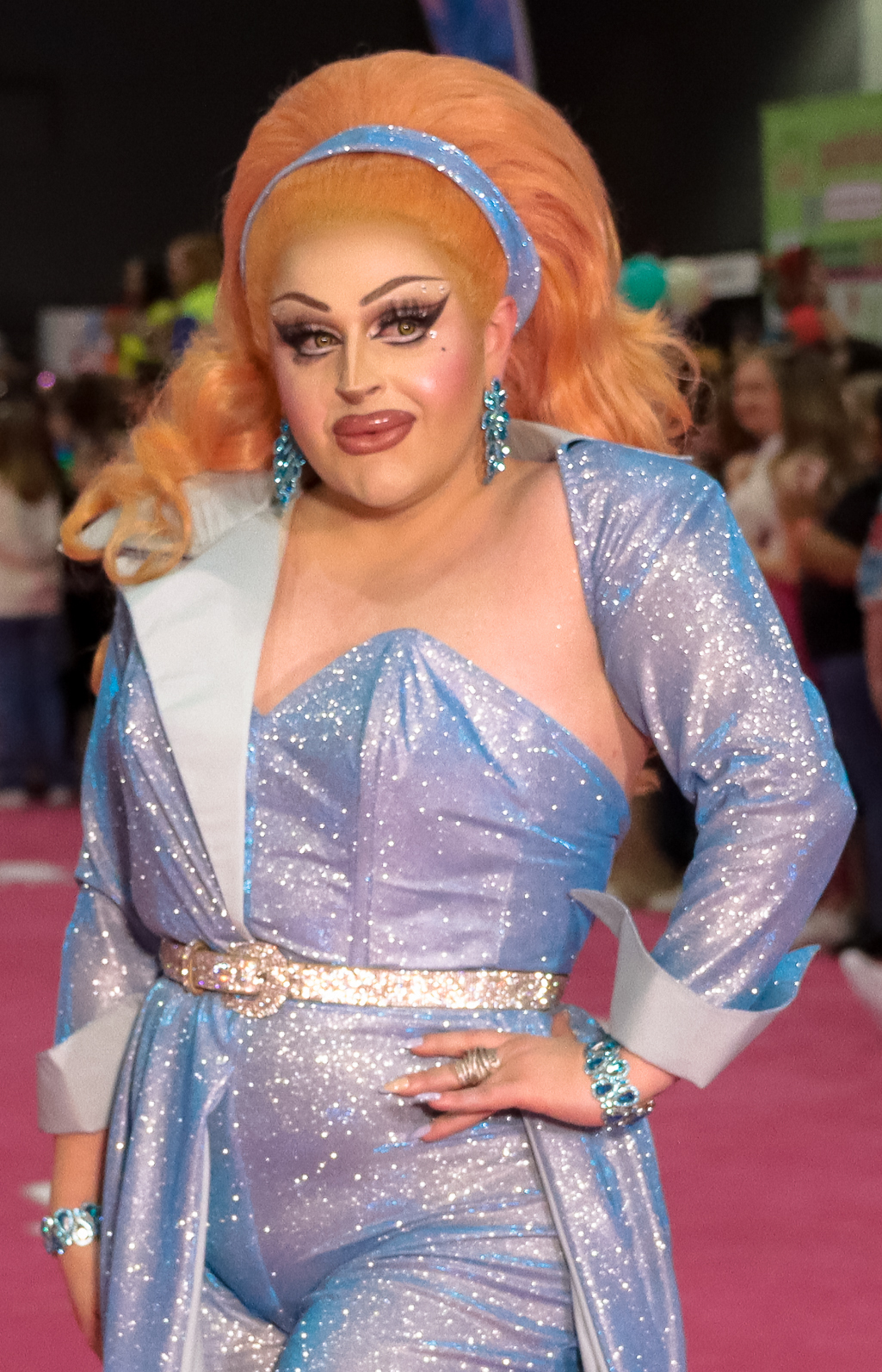
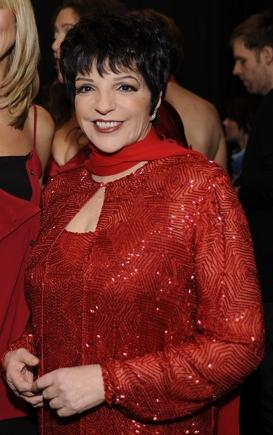
Hannah Conda (left) won on season 2 for her portrayal of Liza Minnelli (right).
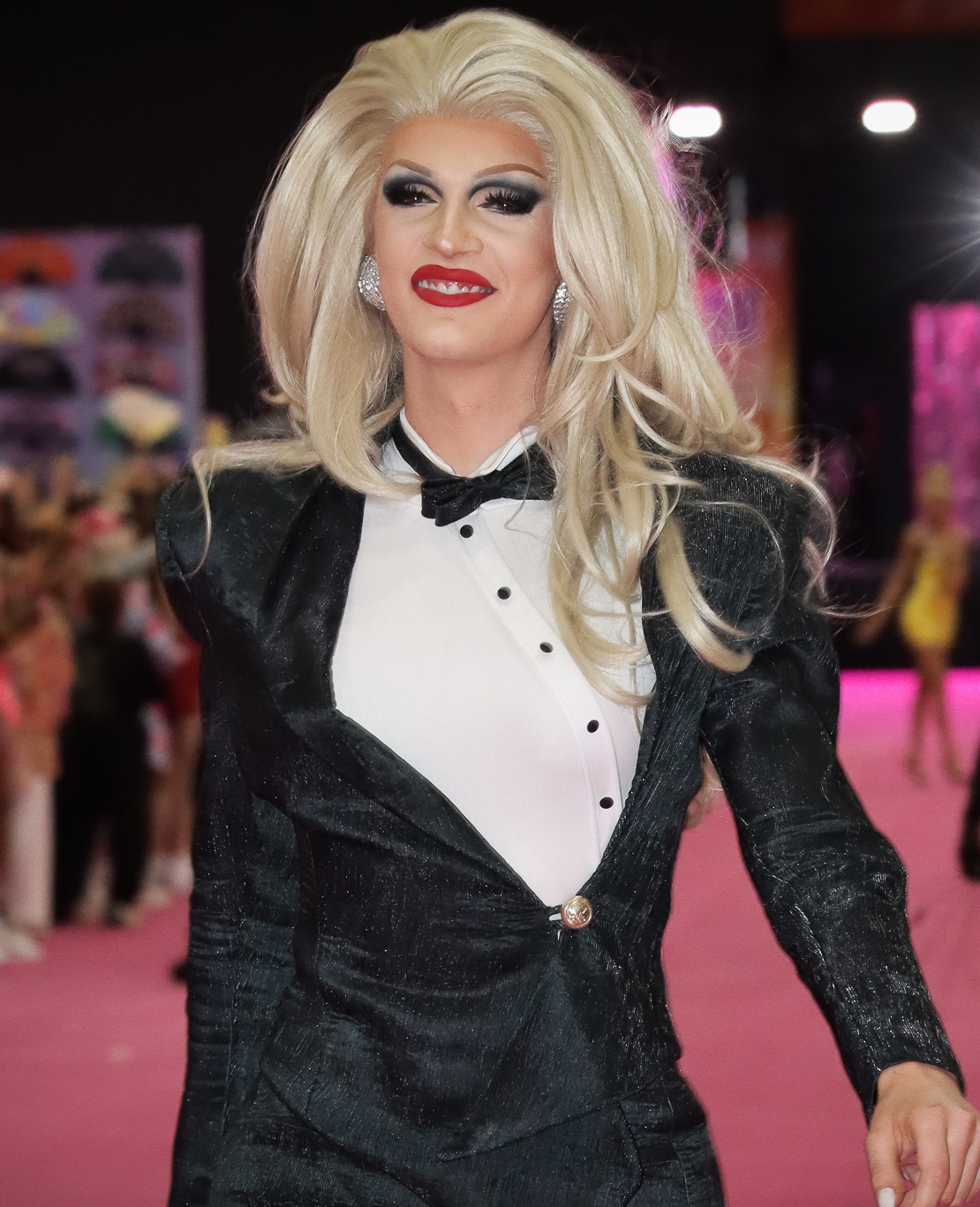
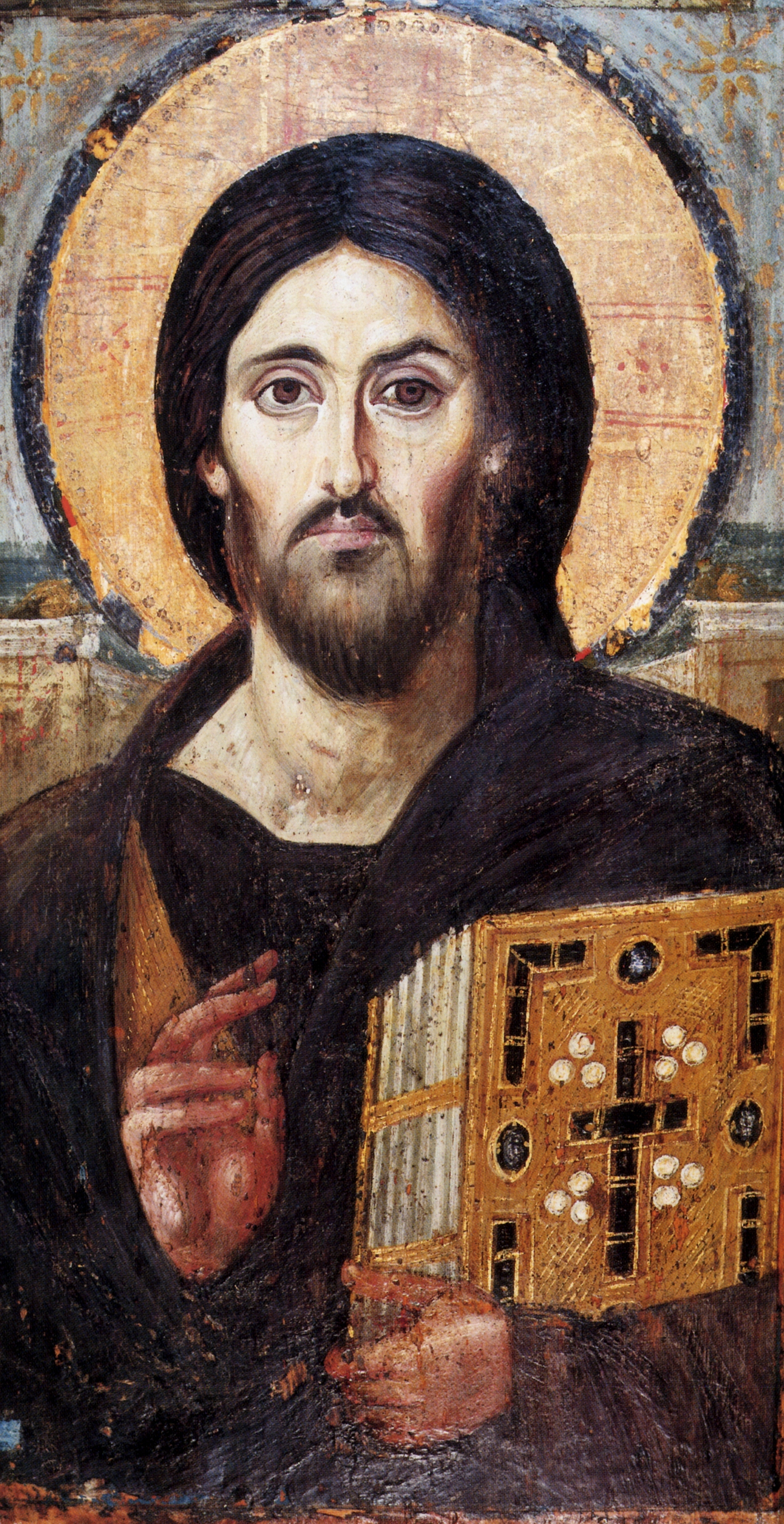
Ashley Madison (left) won on season 3 for her portrayal of Jesus (right).

Contestants of RuPaul's Drag Race Down Under and their imitations
Season	Type	Guest celebrities	Contestant	Impersonation	Result
1	—N/a	Michelle Visage; Rhys Nicholson	Anita Wigl'it	Queen Elizabeth II	WIN
1	—N/a	Michelle Visage; Rhys Nicholson	Elektra Shock	Catherine O'Hara (Note: as Moira Rose from Schitt's Creek)	SAFE
1	—N/a	Michelle Visage; Rhys Nicholson	Etcetera Etcetera	Lindy Chamberlain-Creighton	SAFE
1	—N/a	Michelle Visage; Rhys Nicholson	Karen from Finance	Dolly Parton	SAFE
1	—N/a	Michelle Visage; Rhys Nicholson	Kita Mean	Dr. Seuss	SAFE
1	—N/a	Michelle Visage; Rhys Nicholson	Maxi Shield	Magda Szubanski (Note: as Lynne Postlethwaite from The D-Generation)	SAFE
1	—N/a	Michelle Visage; Rhys Nicholson	Scarlet Adams	Jennifer Coolidge	SAFE
1	—N/a	Michelle Visage; Rhys Nicholson	Coco Jumbo	Lizzo	BTM
1	—N/a	Michelle Visage; Rhys Nicholson	Art Simone	Bindi Irwin	ELIM
2	—N/a	Michelle Visage; Raven	Hannah Conda	Liza Minnelli	WIN
2	—N/a	Michelle Visage; Raven	Kween Kong	NeNe Leakes	SAFE
2	—N/a	Michelle Visage; Raven	Molly Poppinz	Orville Peck	SAFE
2	—N/a	Michelle Visage; Raven	Spankie Jackzon	Barry Humphries (Note: as Humphries' drag character Dame Edna Everage)	SAFE
2	—N/a	Michelle Visage; Raven	Yuri Guaii	Courtney Love	SAFE
2	—N/a	Michelle Visage; Raven	Beverly Kills	Val Garland	BTM
2	—N/a	Michelle Visage; Raven	Minnie Cooper	Ellen DeGeneres	ELIM
3	—N/a	Keiynan Lonsdale; Max Currie	Ashley Madison	Jesus Christ	WIN
3	—N/a	Keiynan Lonsdale; Max Currie	Bumpa Love	Kiri Te Kanawa	SAFE
3	—N/a	Keiynan Lonsdale; Max Currie	Gabriella Labucci	Emma Watkins	SAFE
3	—N/a	Keiynan Lonsdale; Max Currie	Hollywould Star	Naomi Campbell	SAFE
3	—N/a	Keiynan Lonsdale; Max Currie	Isis Avis Loren	Donatella Versace	SAFE
3	—N/a	Keiynan Lonsdale; Max Currie	Flor	Charo	BTM
3	—N/a	Keiynan Lonsdale; Max Currie	Rita Menu	Cardi B	ELIM
4	I'm a Celebrity Impersonator – Snatch Me Outta Here!	Rhys Nicholson; Kita Mean	Brenda Bressed	Gina Riley (Note: as Trude from Kath & Kim)	WIN
4	I'm a Celebrity Impersonator – Snatch Me Outta Here!	Rhys Nicholson; Kita Mean	Freya Armani	Ms. Claus	SAFE
4	I'm a Celebrity Impersonator – Snatch Me Outta Here!	Rhys Nicholson; Kita Mean	Lazy Susan	Lindsay Lohan	SAFE
4	I'm a Celebrity Impersonator – Snatch Me Outta Here!	Rhys Nicholson; Kita Mean	Lucina Innocence	Tabatha Coffey	SAFE
4	I'm a Celebrity Impersonator – Snatch Me Outta Here!	Rhys Nicholson; Kita Mean	Mandy Moobs	Jane Turner (Note: as Kath Day-Knight from Kath & Kim)	SAFE
4	I'm a Celebrity Impersonator – Snatch Me Outta Here!	Rhys Nicholson; Kita Mean	Vybe	Julia Child	SAFE
4	I'm a Celebrity Impersonator – Snatch Me Outta Here!	Rhys Nicholson; Kita Mean	Max Drag Queen	Reese Witherspoon (Note: as Elle Woods from Legally Blonde)	BTM
4	I'm a Celebrity Impersonator – Snatch Me Outta Here!	Rhys Nicholson; Kita Mean	Nikita Iman	Mother Nature	BTM
4	I'm a Celebrity Impersonator – Snatch Me Outta Here!	Rhys Nicholson; Kita Mean	Karna Ford	Eddie Murphy (Note: as Rasputia Latimore from Norbit)	ELIM

==== Drag Race Down Under vs. the World ====
Contestants of Drag Race Down Under vs. the World and their imitations
Season	Guest celebrities	Contestant	Impersonation	Result
1	Lazy Susan; Markella Kavenagh	Art Simone	Jane Turner (Note: as Kath Day-Knight from Kath & Kim)	WIN
1	Lazy Susan; Markella Kavenagh	VYBE	Bette Midler	TOP2
1	Lazy Susan; Markella Kavenagh	Coco Jumbo	Barry White	SAFE
1	Lazy Susan; Markella Kavenagh	Estrella Xtravaganza	Charo	SAFE
1	Lazy Susan; Markella Kavenagh	LaLa Ri	Rick James	SAFE
1	Lazy Susan; Markella Kavenagh	M1ss Jade So	The Universe (Note: credited as "The Un1verse")	SAFE
1	Lazy Susan; Markella Kavenagh	Michael Marouli	Tim Curry (Note: as Dr. Frank-N-Furter from The Rocky Horror Picture Show)	SAFE
1	Lazy Susan; Markella Kavenagh	Flor	Rowan Atkinson (Note: as Mr. Bean from Mr. Bean)	BTM
1	Lazy Susan; Markella Kavenagh	Nikita Iman	Mary Jane	ELIM

=== Drag Race España ===
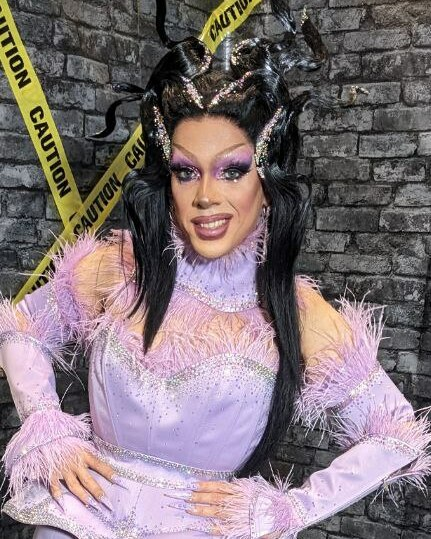
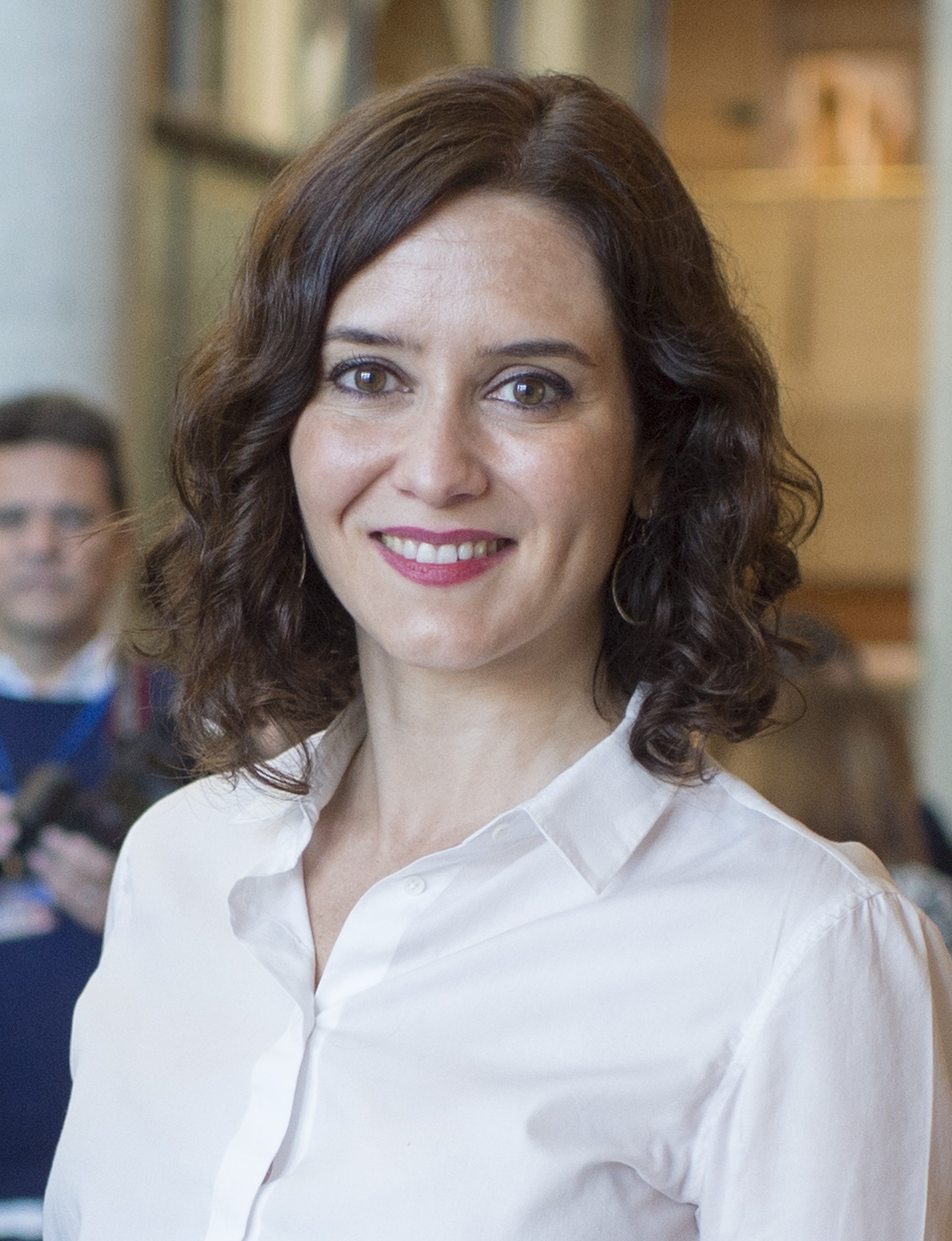
Killer Queen (left) won on season 1 for her portrayal of Isabel Díaz Ayuso (right).
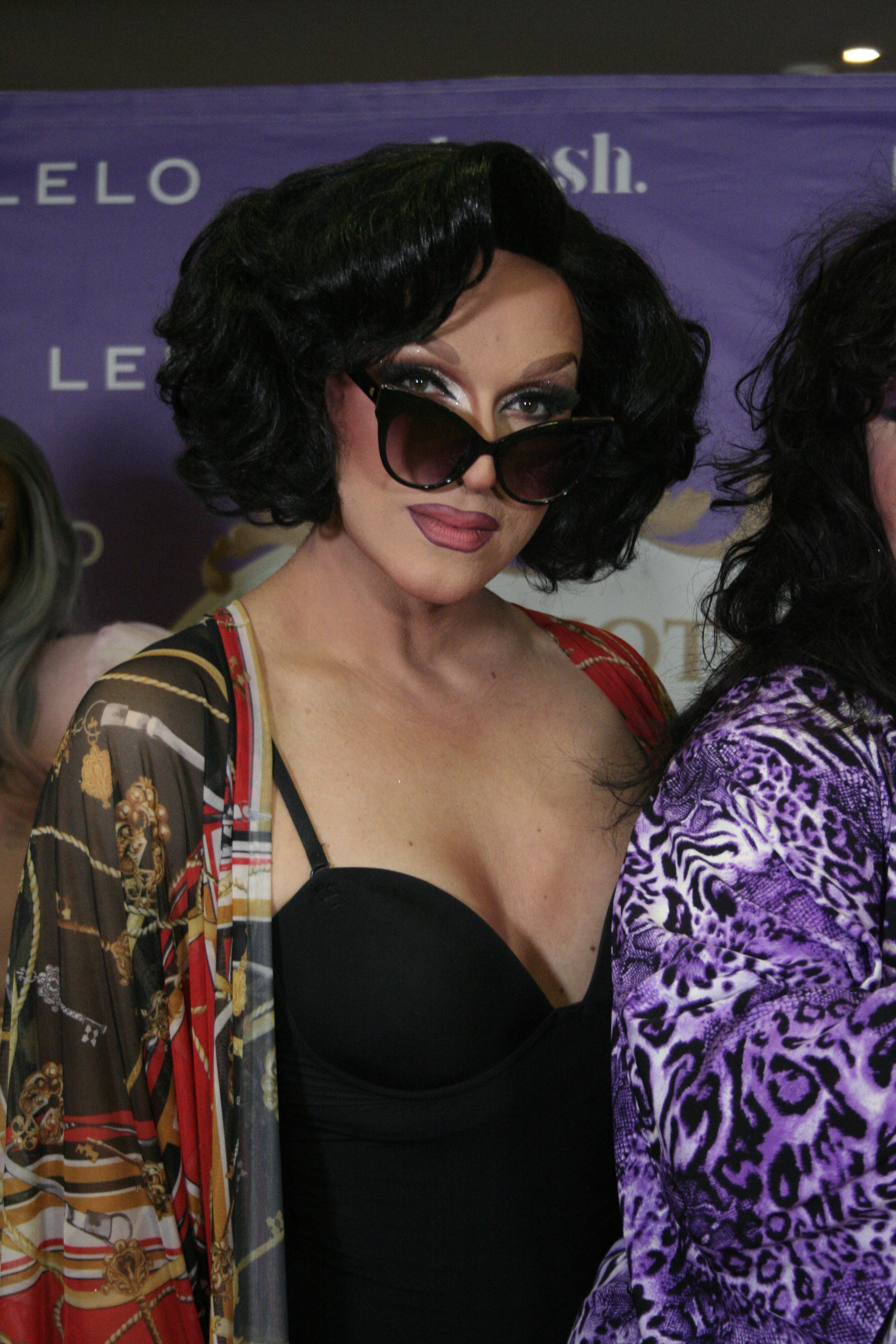
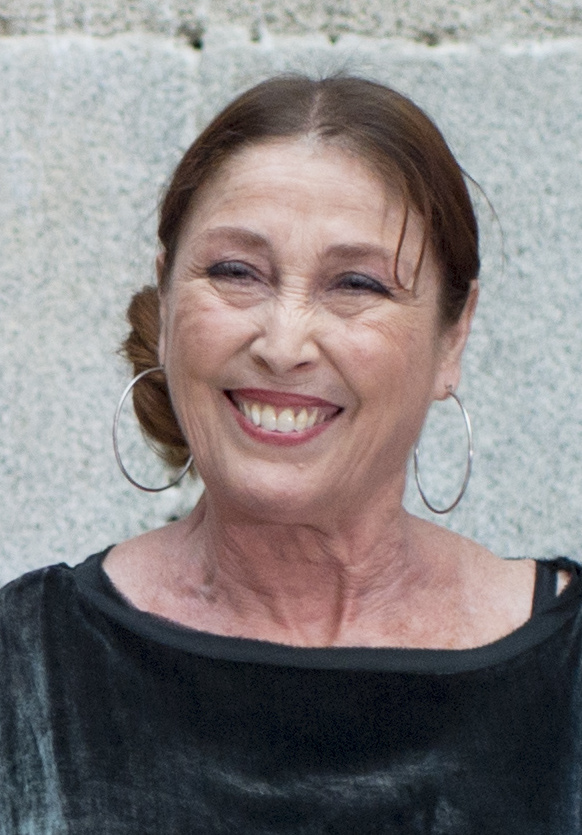
Sharonne (left) won on season 2 for her portrayal of Verónica Forqué (right).
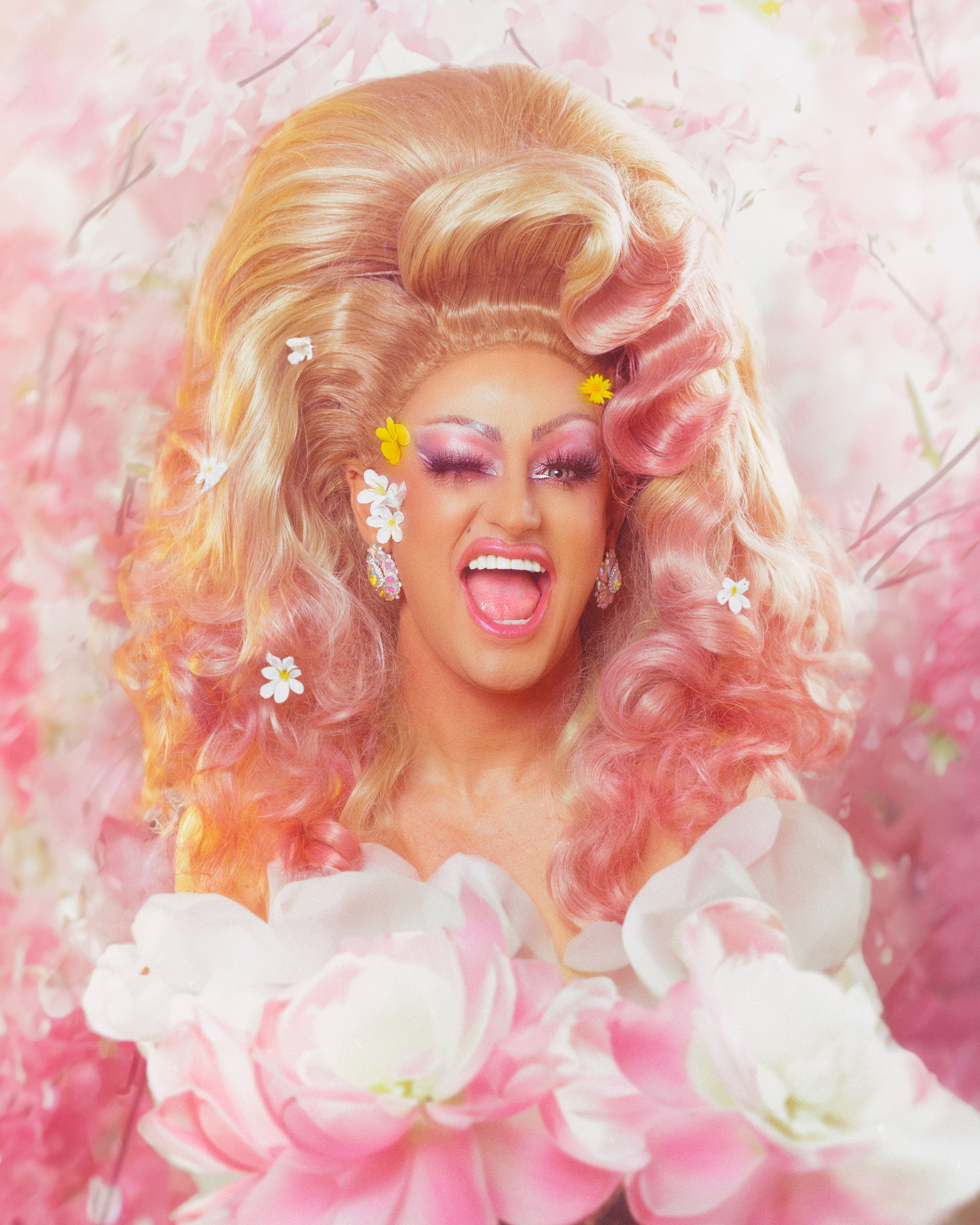
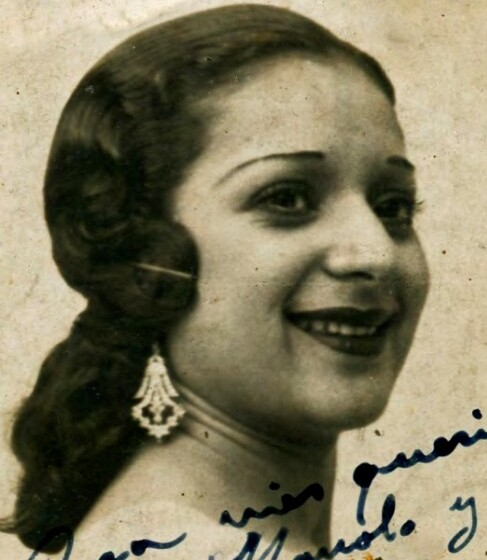
Pink Chadora (left) won on season 3 for her portrayal of Lola Flores (right).
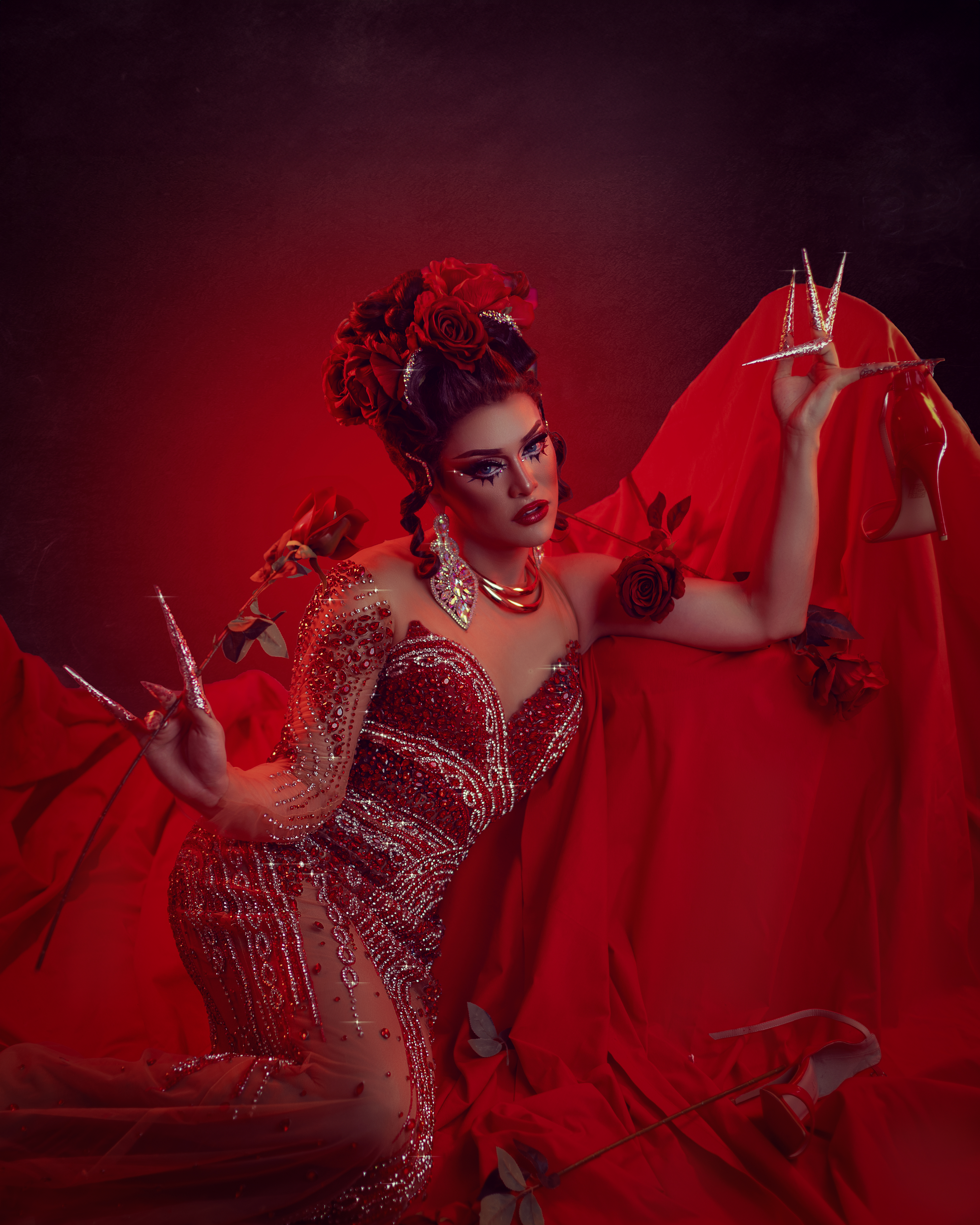
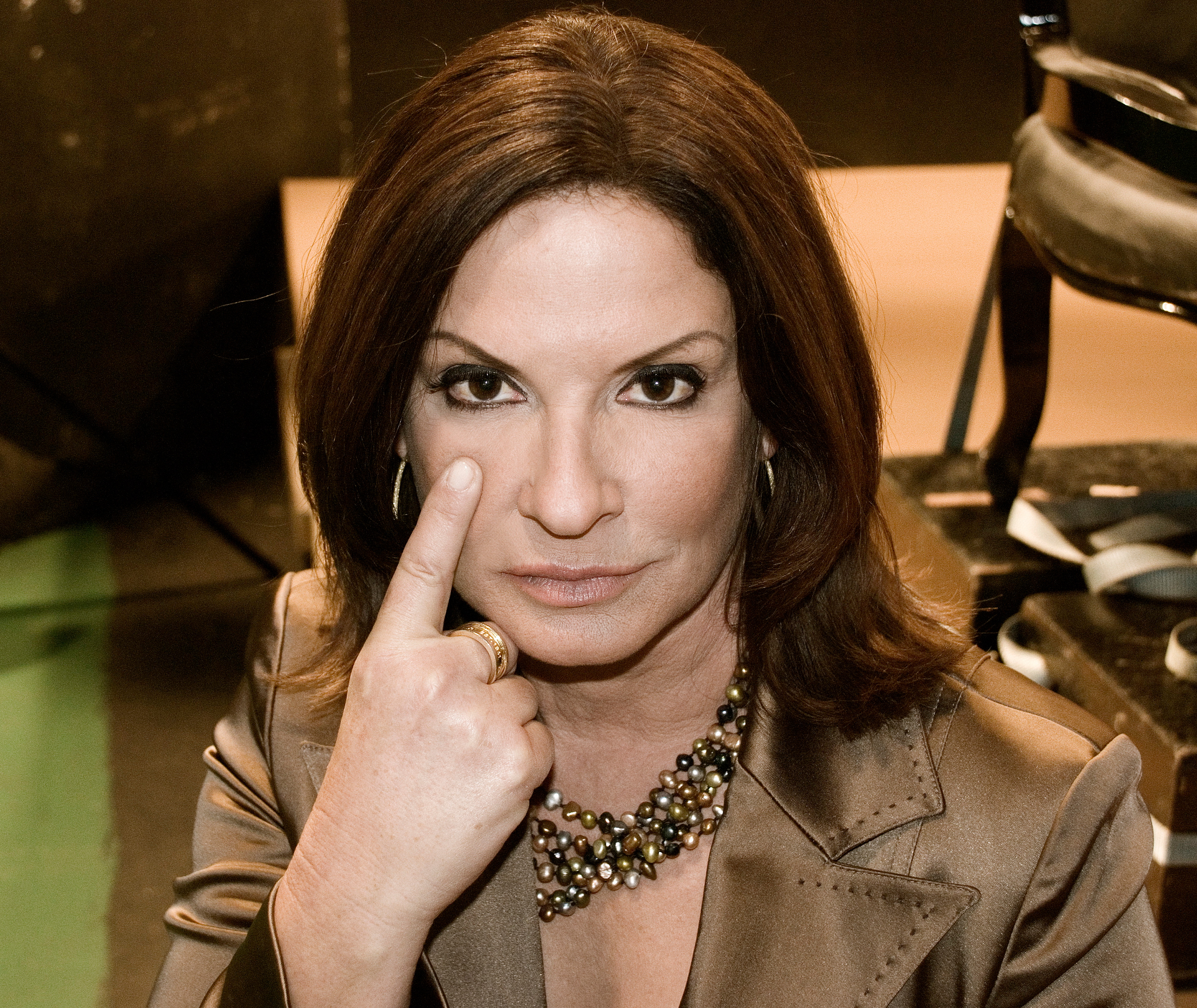
Mariana Stars (left) won on season 4 for her portrayal of Ana María Polo (right).

Contestants of Drag Race España and their imitations
Season	Guest celebrities	Contestant	Impersonation	Result
1	Samantha Hudson; Kika Lorace	Killer Queen	Isabel Díaz Ayuso	WIN
1	Samantha Hudson; Kika Lorace	Carmen Farala	Dakota Tárraga	SAFE
1	Samantha Hudson; Kika Lorace	Dovima Nurmi	Cayetana Fitz-James Stuart	SAFE
1	Samantha Hudson; Kika Lorace	Pupi Poisson	Karina	SAFE
1	Samantha Hudson; Kika Lorace	Sagittaria	Encarnita Rojas	SAFE
1	Samantha Hudson; Kika Lorace	Hugáceo Crujiente	Mona Lisa	BTM
1	Samantha Hudson; Kika Lorace	Arantxa Castilla-La Mancha	Belén Esteban	ELIM
2	Eva Hache; Jedet	Sharonne	Verónica Forqué	WIN
2	Eva Hache; Jedet	Drag Sethlas	Carmen Lomana	SAFE
2	Eva Hache; Jedet	Estrella Xtravaganza	Paquita Salas	SAFE
2	Eva Hache; Jedet	Juriji Der Klee	Isabel (Note: from the viral video Las vecinas de Valencia)	SAFE
2	Eva Hache; Jedet	Marina	Antonia Dell'Atte	SAFE
2	Eva Hache; Jedet	Venedita Von Däsh	Miguel Bosé	SAFE
2	Eva Hache; Jedet	Diamante Merybrown	RuPaul	BTM
2	Eva Hache; Jedet	Onyx	Joanna of Castile	ELIM
3	Karina; Pupi Poisson (Note: Special guest Pupi Poisson reenacted her season one impersonation of Karina, who was also a celebrity guest alongside Pupi.)	Pink Chadora	Lola Flores	WIN
3	Karina; Pupi Poisson	Bestiah	La Hierbas	SAFE
3	Karina; Pupi Poisson	Clover Bish	Maite Galdeano	SAFE
3	Karina; Pupi Poisson	Hornella Góngora	Juan Carlos I	SAFE
3	Karina; Pupi Poisson	Pitita	Sara Montiel	SAFE
3	Karina; Pupi Poisson	Vania Vainilla	Bárbara Rey	SAFE
3	Karina; Pupi Poisson	Visa	Paulina Rubio	SAFE
3	Karina; Pupi Poisson	Pakita	Peppa Pig (Note: Credited as Pepa Pink.)	BTM
3	Karina; Pupi Poisson	The Macarena	Paca la Piraña	ELIM
4	Ger; Lalachus	Mariana Stars	Ana María Polo	WIN
4	Ger; Lalachus	Chloe Vittu	Amaia Romero	SAFE
4	Ger; Lalachus	La Niña Delantro	El Neng de Castefa	SAFE
4	Ger; Lalachus	Le Cocó	Ana Locking	SAFE
4	Ger; Lalachus	Megui Yeillow	Yurena	SAFE
4	Ger; Lalachus	La Bella Vampi	Mario Vaquerizo	SAFE
4	Ger; Lalachus	Angelita La Perversa	Glòria Serra	BTM
4	Ger; Lalachus	Miss Khristo	Ylenia Padilla	ELIM
5	Brays Efe; Yenesi	Satín Greco	Isabel Pantoja	WIN
5	Brays Efe; Yenesi	Dafne Mugler	La Rebe de Plasencia	SAFE
5	Brays Efe; Yenesi	Denébola Murnau	Eduard Punset	SAFE
5	Brays Efe; Yenesi	Ferrxn	Rita Barberá	SAFE
5	Brays Efe; Yenesi	Laca Udilla	Francisco Franco	SAFE
5	Brays Efe; Yenesi	Margarita Kalifata	Torrente (Note: a fictional character portrayed by Santiago Segura in the Torrente film series.)	SAFE
5	Brays Efe; Yenesi	Nix	Mickey Mouse (Note: Credited as "Cierto Ratón Famoso")	SAVE
5	Brays Efe; Yenesi	Alexandra del Raval	Harry Potter (Note: Credited as "Harry El Petas")	BTM
5	Brays Efe; Yenesi	Krystal Forever	Celia Cruz	ELIM
6	Le Cocó (Note: as their comedic characters Las Pilardos); Megui Yeillow	Buba Anorex	La Huesito	WIN
6	Le Cocó; Megui Yeillow	Alma DeSoul	La Veneno	SAFE
6	Le Cocó; Megui Yeillow	Kim Miller	Abel Caballero	SAFE
6	Le Cocó; Megui Yeillow	Liak	Maluma	SAFE
6	Le Cocó; Megui Yeillow	Maitetxu Mia	Karlos Arguiñano	SAFE
6	Le Cocó; Megui Yeillow	Maitetxu Mia	La Otxoa	SAFE
6	Le Cocó; Megui Yeillow	Sorny	Ana Obregón	SAFE
6	Le Cocó; Megui Yeillow	Coco Luna	Laura Bozzo	SAVE
6	Le Cocó; Megui Yeillow	Vanessa Artiles	Bette Midler (Note: as Winifred Sanderson from Hocus Pocus)	BTM
6	Le Cocó; Megui Yeillow	Marcus Massalami	Ludwig van Beethoven	ELIM

==== Drag Race España All Stars ====
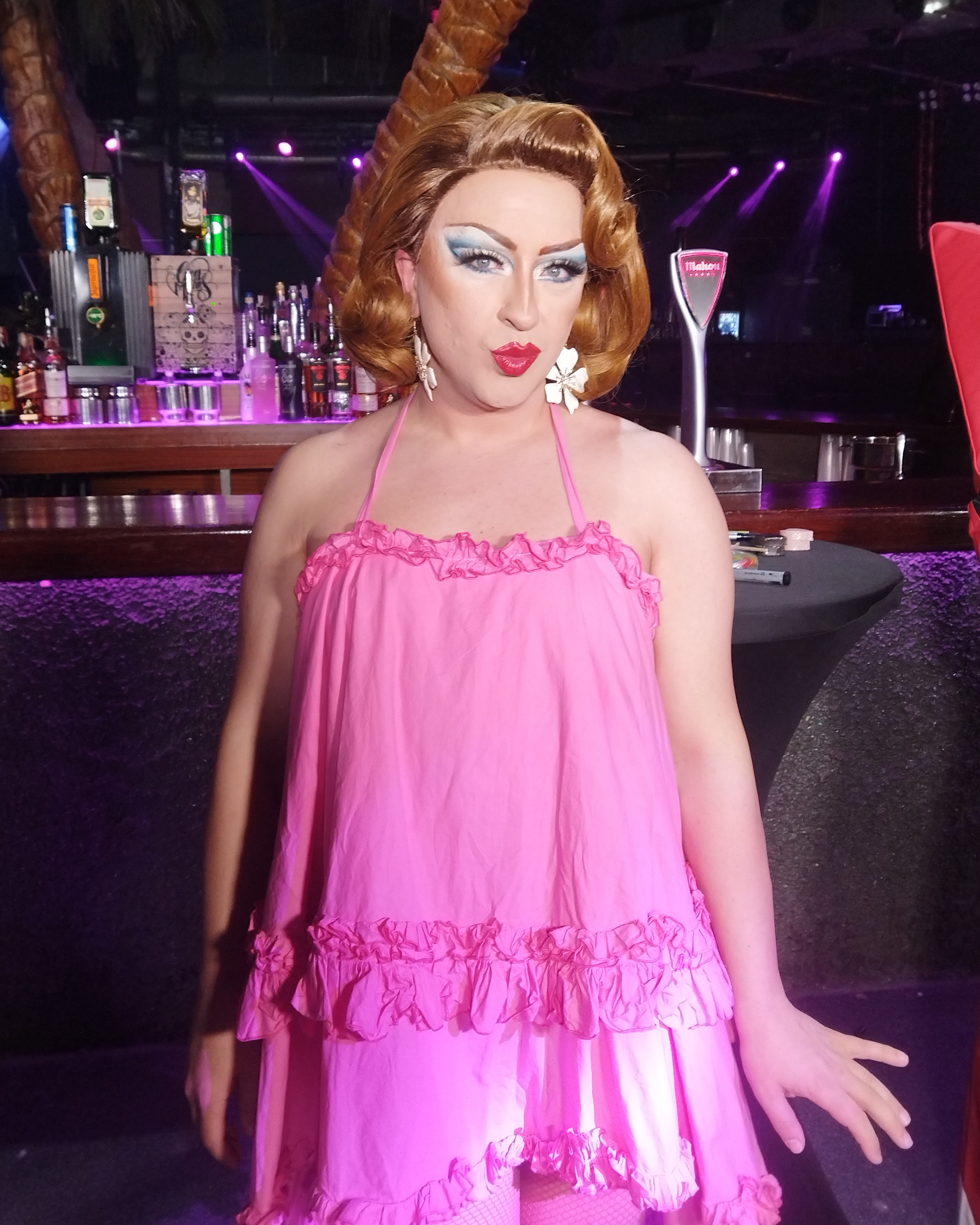
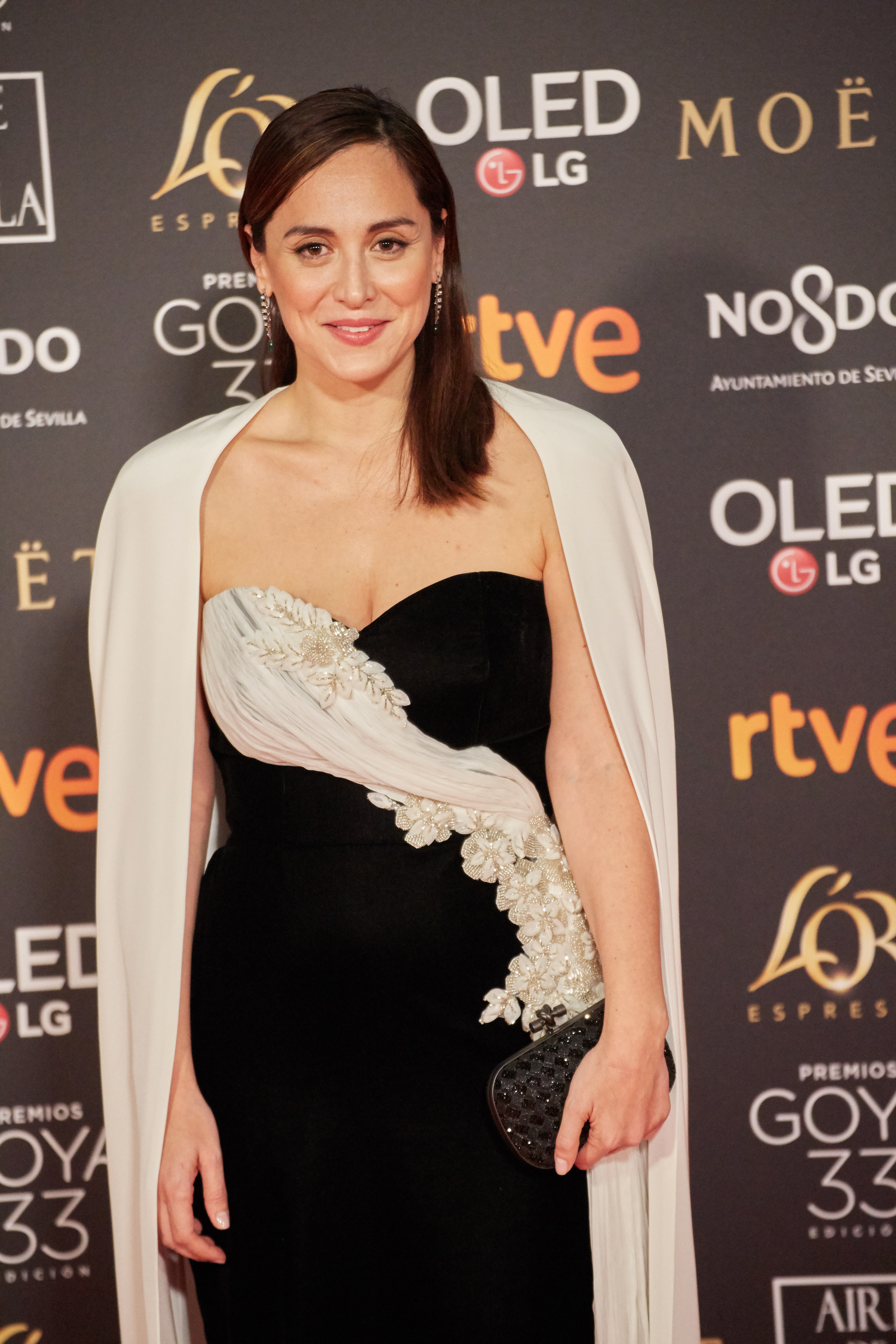
Pupi Poisson (left) won on season 1 for her portrayal of Tamara Falcó (right).

Contestants of Drag Race España All Stars and their imitations
Season	Guest celebrities	Contestant	Impersonation	Result
1	Yurena; Yola Berrocal	Pupi Poisson	Tamara Falcó	WIN
1	Yurena; Yola Berrocal	Drag Sethlas	Aless Gibaja	TOP2
1	Yurena; Yola Berrocal	Hornella Góngora	José Luis Moreno	SAFE
1	Yurena; Yola Berrocal	Juriji Der Klee	Aramis Fuster	SAFE
1	Yurena; Yola Berrocal	Pakita	Carmen de Mairena	SAFE
1	Yurena; Yola Berrocal	Samantha Ballentines	Raphael	SAFE
1	Yurena; Yola Berrocal	Sagittaria	Rosario Flores	BTM
1	Yurena; Yola Berrocal	Onyx Unleashed	Lorenzo Caprile	ELIM

=== Drag Race France ===
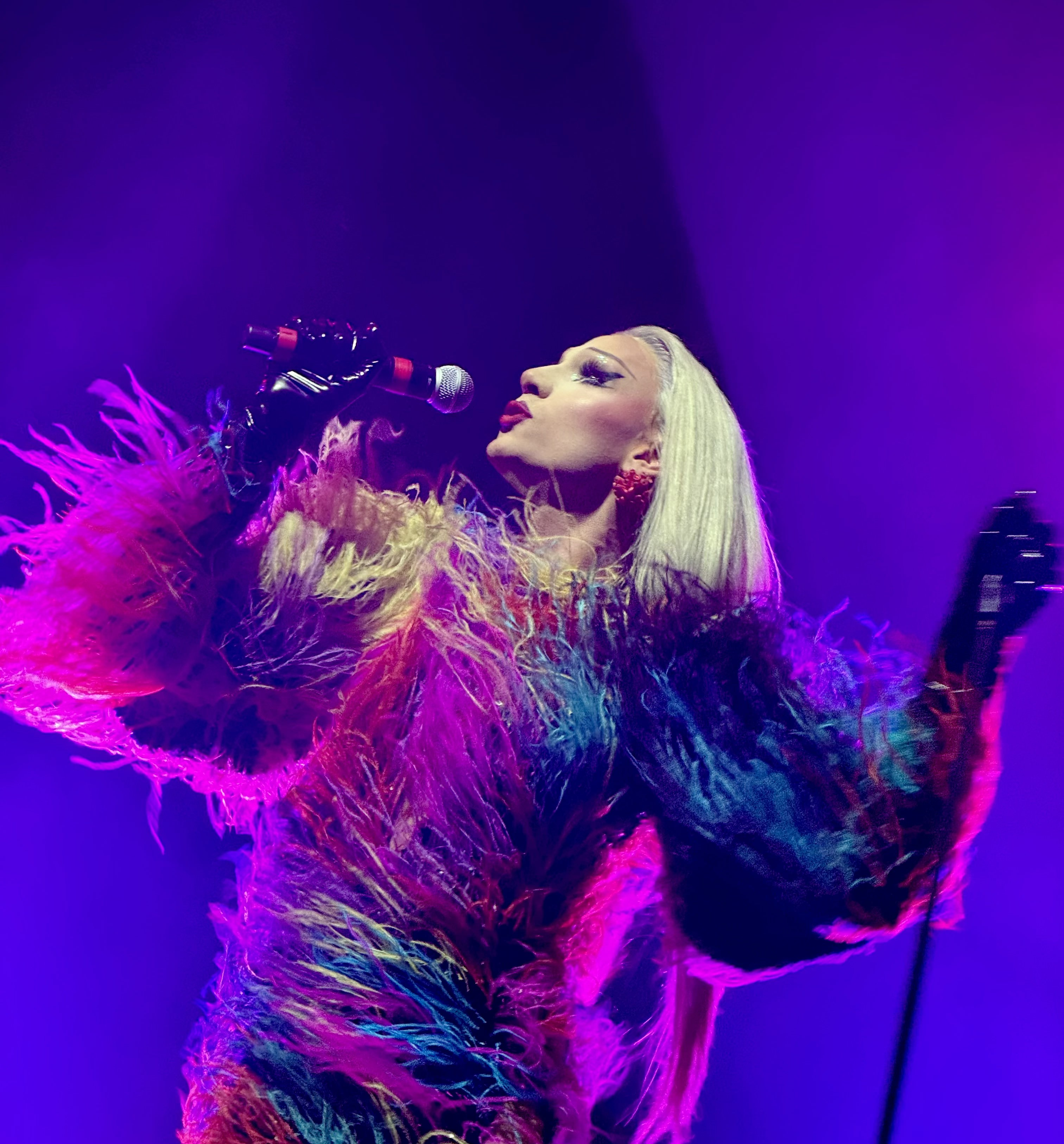
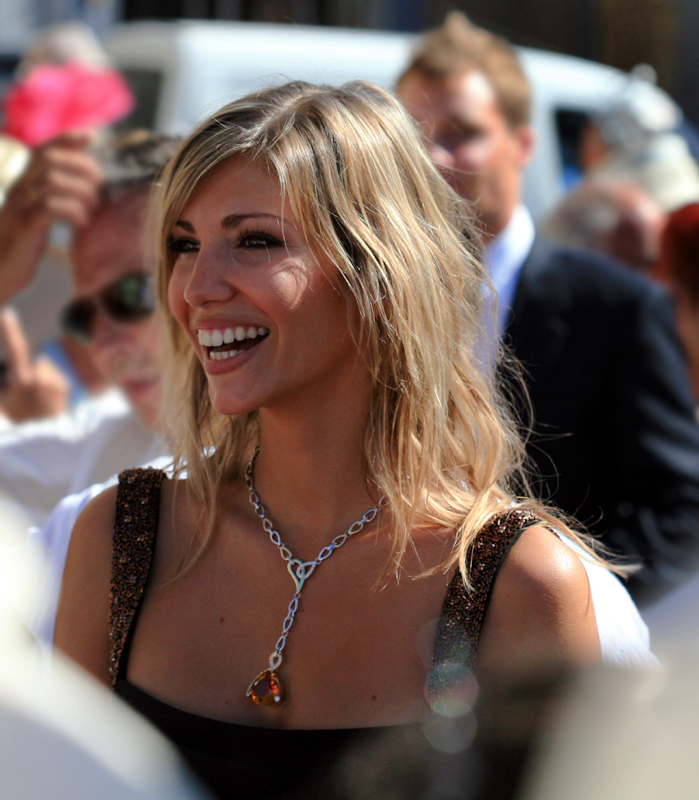
La Grande Dame (left) won on season 1 for her portrayal of Alexandra Rosenfeld (right).
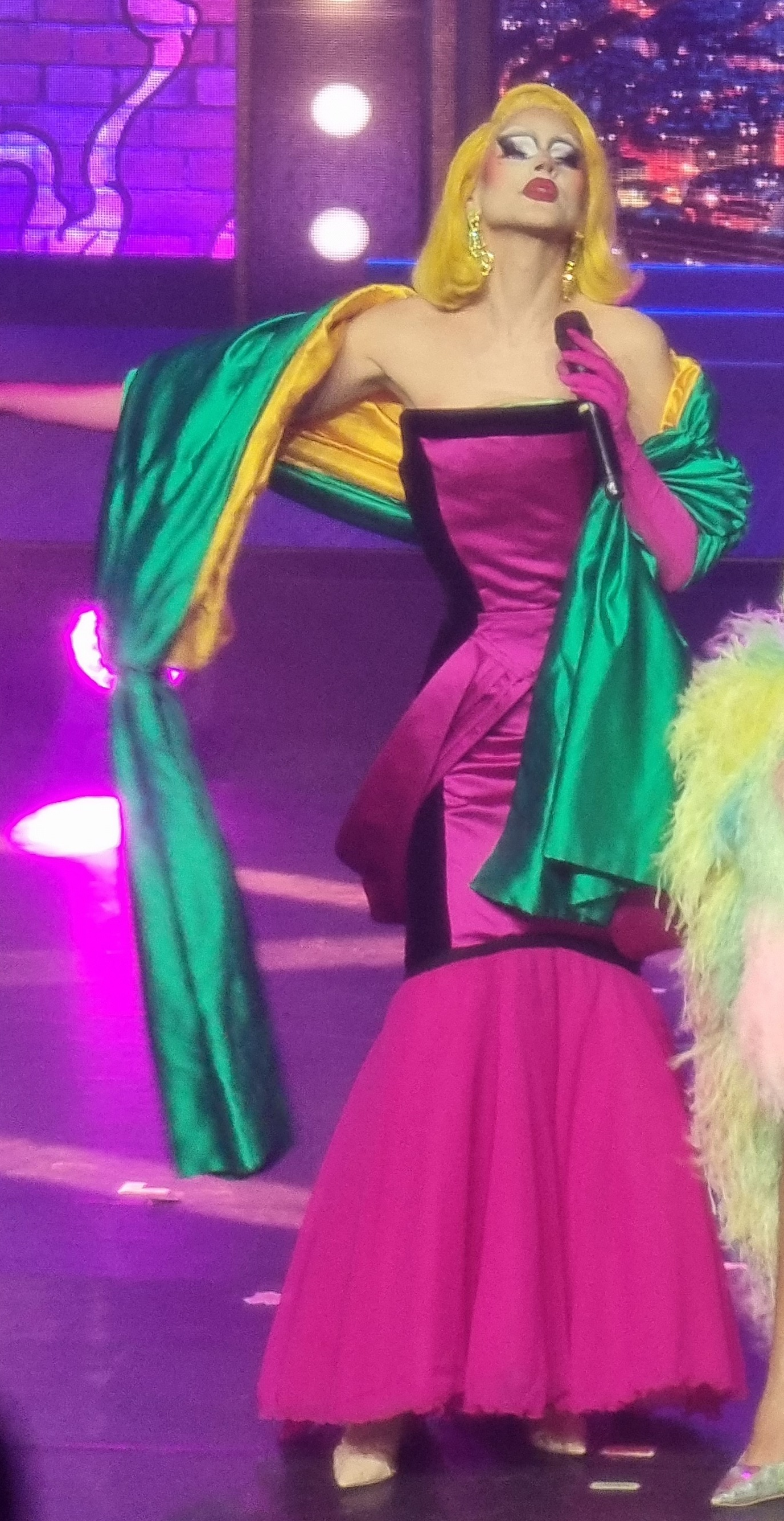
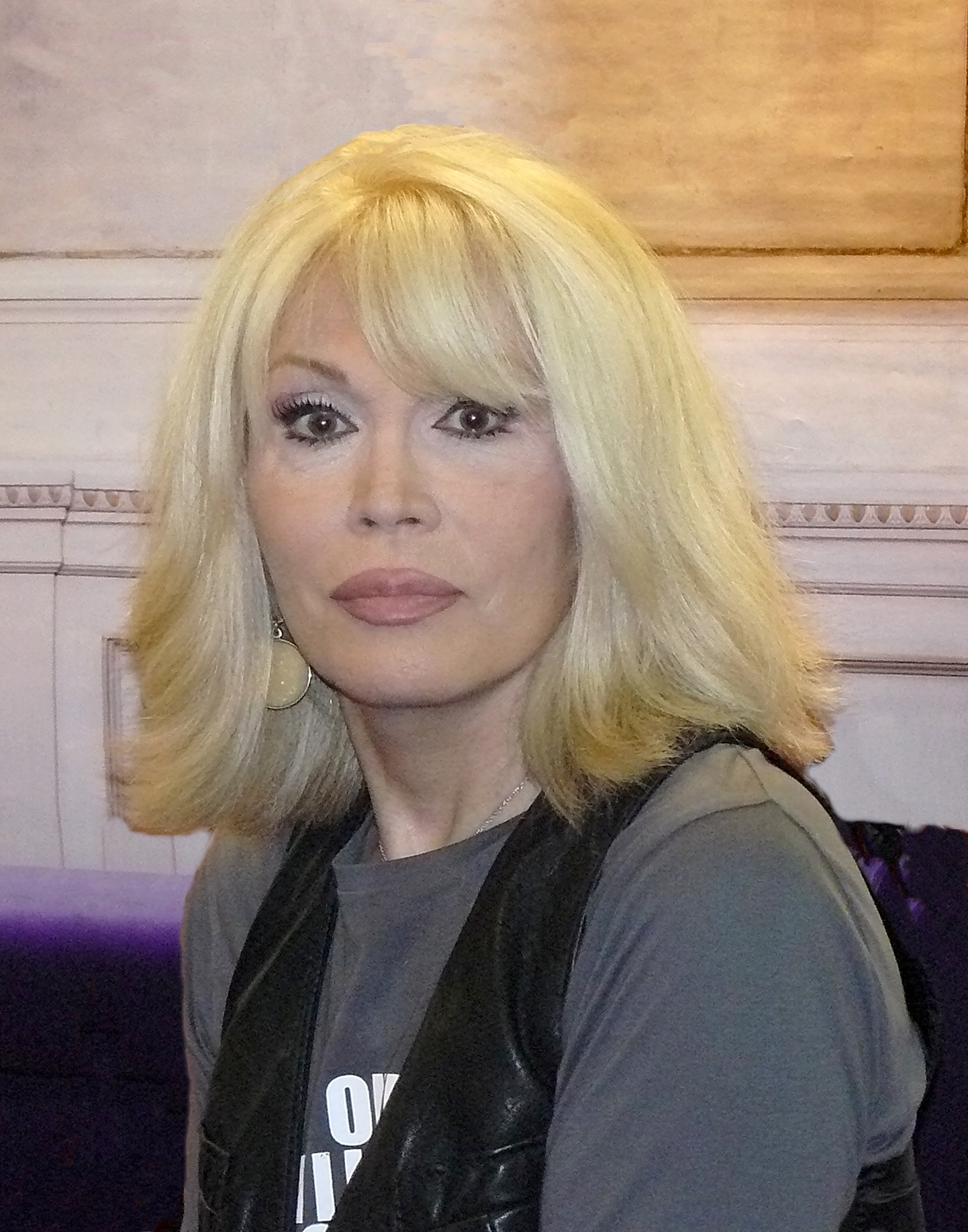
Punani (left) won on season 2 for her portrayal of Amanda Lear (right).

Contestants of Drag Race France and their imitations
Season	Guest celebrities	Contestant	Impersonation	Result
1	Bérengère Krief; Bilal Hassani	La Grande Dame	Alexandra Rosenfeld	WIN
1	Bérengère Krief; Bilal Hassani	Elips	Chantal Ladesou	SAFE
1	Bérengère Krief; Bilal Hassani	Lolita Banana	Rossy de Palma	SAFE
1	Bérengère Krief; Bilal Hassani	Paloma	Fanny Ardant	SAFE
1	Bérengère Krief; Bilal Hassani	Soa de Muse	Félindra	SAFE
1	Bérengère Krief; Bilal Hassani	La Big Bertha	Jean-Pierre Coffe	BTM
1	Bérengère Krief; Bilal Hassani	Kam Hugh	Mireille Mathieu	ELIM
2	Amanda Lear; Eddy de Pretto	Punani	Amanda Lear	WIN
2	Amanda Lear; Eddy de Pretto	Cookie Kunty	Johnny Halliday	SAFE
2	Amanda Lear; Eddy de Pretto	Keiona	Afida Turner	SAFE
2	Amanda Lear; Eddy de Pretto	Mami Watta	Shauna Sand	SAFE
2	Amanda Lear; Eddy de Pretto	Moon	Brigitte Fontaine	SAFE
2	Amanda Lear; Eddy de Pretto	Sara Forever	Françoise Sagan	SAFE
2	Amanda Lear; Eddy de Pretto	Ginger Bitch	Victoria Silvstedt	BTM
2	Amanda Lear; Eddy de Pretto	Piche	Geneviève de Fontenay	ELIM
3 (Note: As a twist, the contestants were asked to switch to a second character mid-Snatch Game.)	Cristina Córdula; Tahnee	Ruby on the Nail	Jul	WIN
3	Cristina Córdula; Tahnee	Ruby on the Nail	Isabelle Adjani	WIN
3	Cristina Córdula; Tahnee	Leona Winter	Ève Angeli	SAFE
3	Cristina Córdula; Tahnee	Leona Winter	Armande Altaï	SAFE
3	Cristina Córdula; Tahnee	Lula Strega	Barbara	SAFE
3	Cristina Córdula; Tahnee	Lula Strega	Chantal Goya	SAFE
3	Cristina Córdula; Tahnee	Misty Phoenix	Lolo Ferrari	SAFE
3	Cristina Córdula; Tahnee	Misty Phoenix	Sylvie Tellier	SAFE
3	Cristina Córdula; Tahnee	Perseo	La Veneno	SAFE
3	Cristina Córdula; Tahnee	Perseo	Katy Perry	SAFE
3	Cristina Córdula; Tahnee	Le Filip	Dalida	BTM
3	Cristina Córdula; Tahnee	Le Filip	Arielle Dombasle	BTM
3	Cristina Córdula; Tahnee	Norma Bell	Cristina Córdula	ELIM
3	Cristina Córdula; Tahnee	Norma Bell	Père Fouras	ELIM
4	Fatou Guinea; Jessé Rémond Lacroix	Lana Cotta	Celine Dion	WIN
4	Fatou Guinea; Jessé Rémond Lacroix	Daisy Superbitch	Jacques Chirac	SAFE
4	Fatou Guinea; Jessé Rémond Lacroix	La Harpie	Lara Fabian	SAFE
4	Fatou Guinea; Jessé Rémond Lacroix	Sublyme	Franck Ribéry	SAFE
4	Fatou Guinea; Jessé Rémond Lacroix	Fluffy Bidule	Marianne James	SAVE
4	Fatou Guinea; Jessé Rémond Lacroix	Azémylia	Fauve Hautot	BTM
4	Fatou Guinea; Jessé Rémond Lacroix	Holly White	Mariah Carey	ELIM

==== Drag Race France All Stars ====
Contestants of Drag Race France All Stars and their imitations
Season	Type	Family	Contestant	Impersonation	Result
1	Snatch Game en or	Camille Razat	Punani	Louis XIV	TOP2
1	Snatch Game en or	Camille Razat	La Big Bertha	Maïté	SAFE
1	Snatch Game en or	Camille Razat	Mami Watta	Eiffel Tower	SAFE
1	Snatch Game en or	Camille Razat	Moon	Shirley	SAFE
1	Snatch Game en or	Camille Razat	Kam Hugh	Caroline Margeridon	BTM
1	Snatch Game en or	Noam Sinseau	Misty Phoenix	Dorothée	WIN
1	Snatch Game en or	Noam Sinseau	Elips	Mélanie Laurent	SAFE
1	Snatch Game en or	Noam Sinseau	Piche	Sylvie Jenaly	SAFE
1	Snatch Game en or	Noam Sinseau	Soa de Muse	Jacques	ELIM

=== Drag Race Germany ===
Contestants of Drag Race Germany and their imitations
Season	Type	Guest celebrities	Contestants	Impersonation	Result
1	Snatch Game at Sea	Dianne Brill; Gianni Jovanovic	Kelly Heelton	Bruce Darnell	WIN
1	Snatch Game at Sea	Dianne Brill; Gianni Jovanovic	Metamorkid	Wolfgang Amadeus Mozart	SAFE
1	Snatch Game at Sea	Dianne Brill; Gianni Jovanovic	Pandora Nox	Arnold Schwarzenegger (Note: as Terminator from the Terminator franchise)	SAFE
1	Snatch Game at Sea	Dianne Brill; Gianni Jovanovic	Yvonne Nightstand	Vincent Raven	SAFE
1	Snatch Game at Sea	Dianne Brill; Gianni Jovanovic	Loreley Rivers	Ludwig van Beethoven	BTM
1	Snatch Game at Sea	Dianne Brill; Gianni Jovanovic	Victoria Shakespears	Inês Brasil	BTM
1	Snatch Game at Sea	Dianne Brill; Gianni Jovanovic	Nikita Vegaz	Silvia Wollny (Note: Credited as Frau Wollny.)	ELIM

=== Drag Race Holland ===
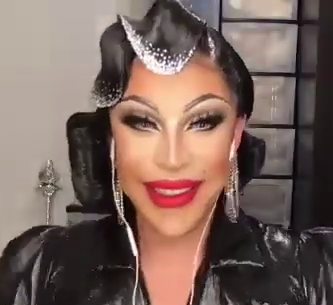
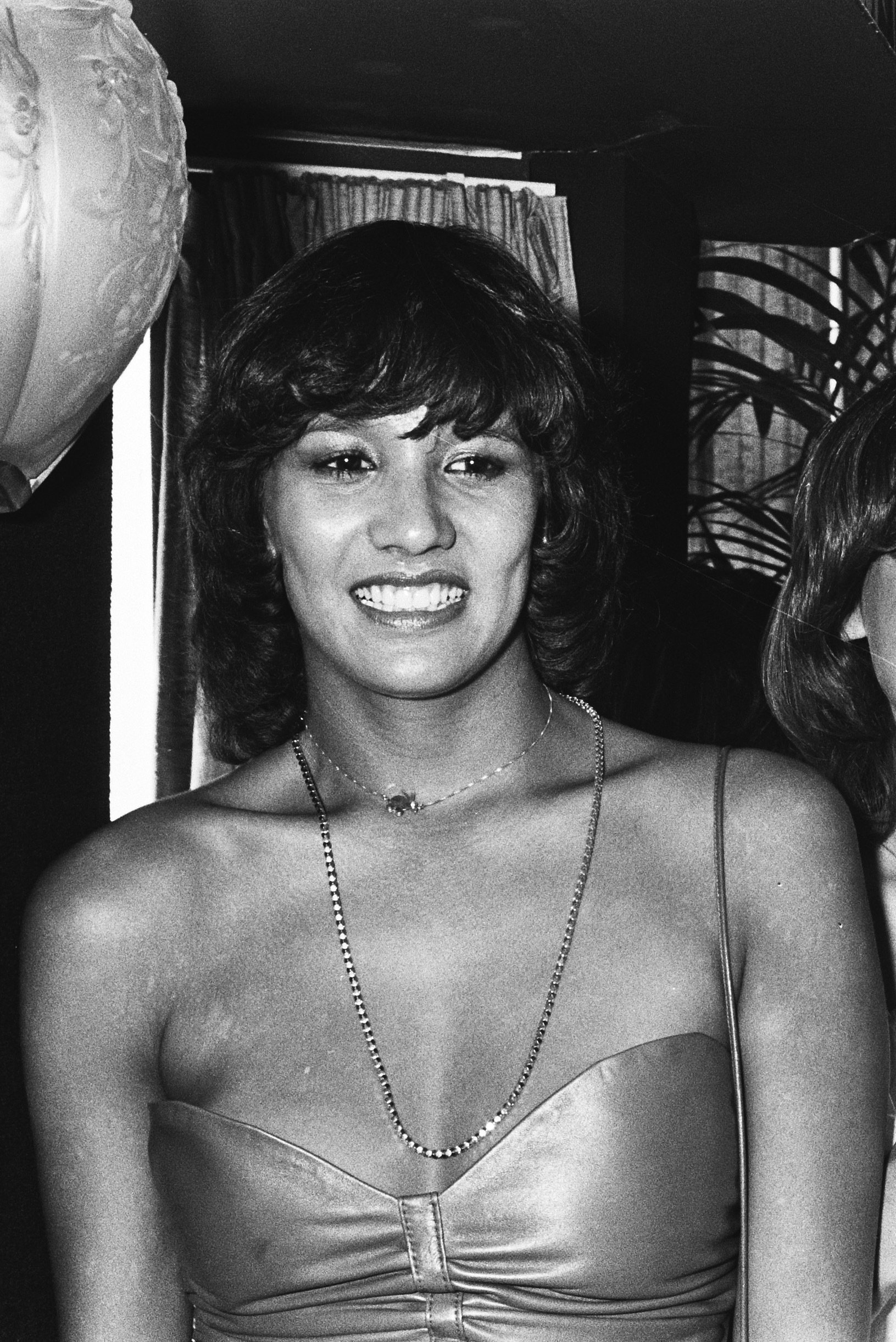
Envy Peru (left) won on season 1 for her portrayal of Patty Brard (right).
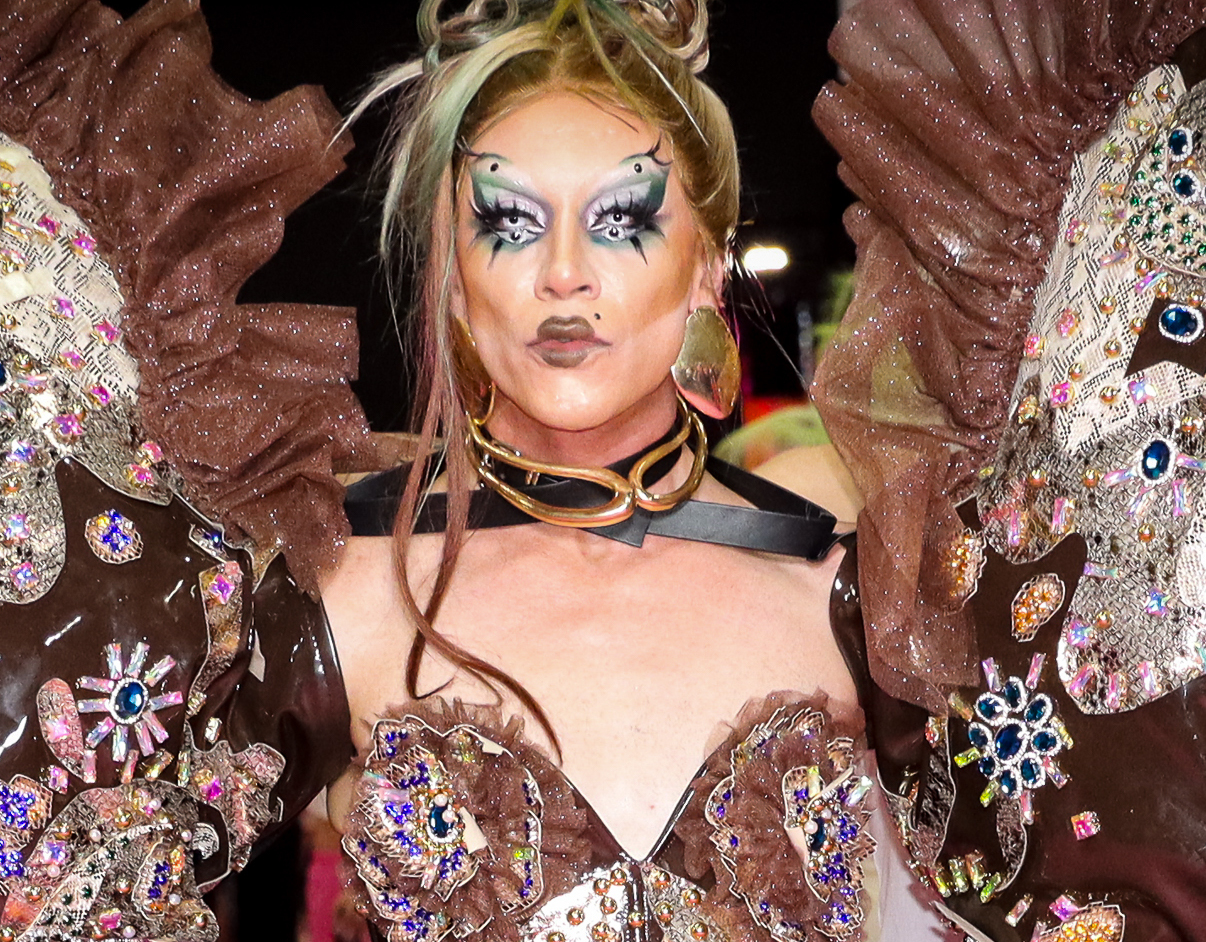
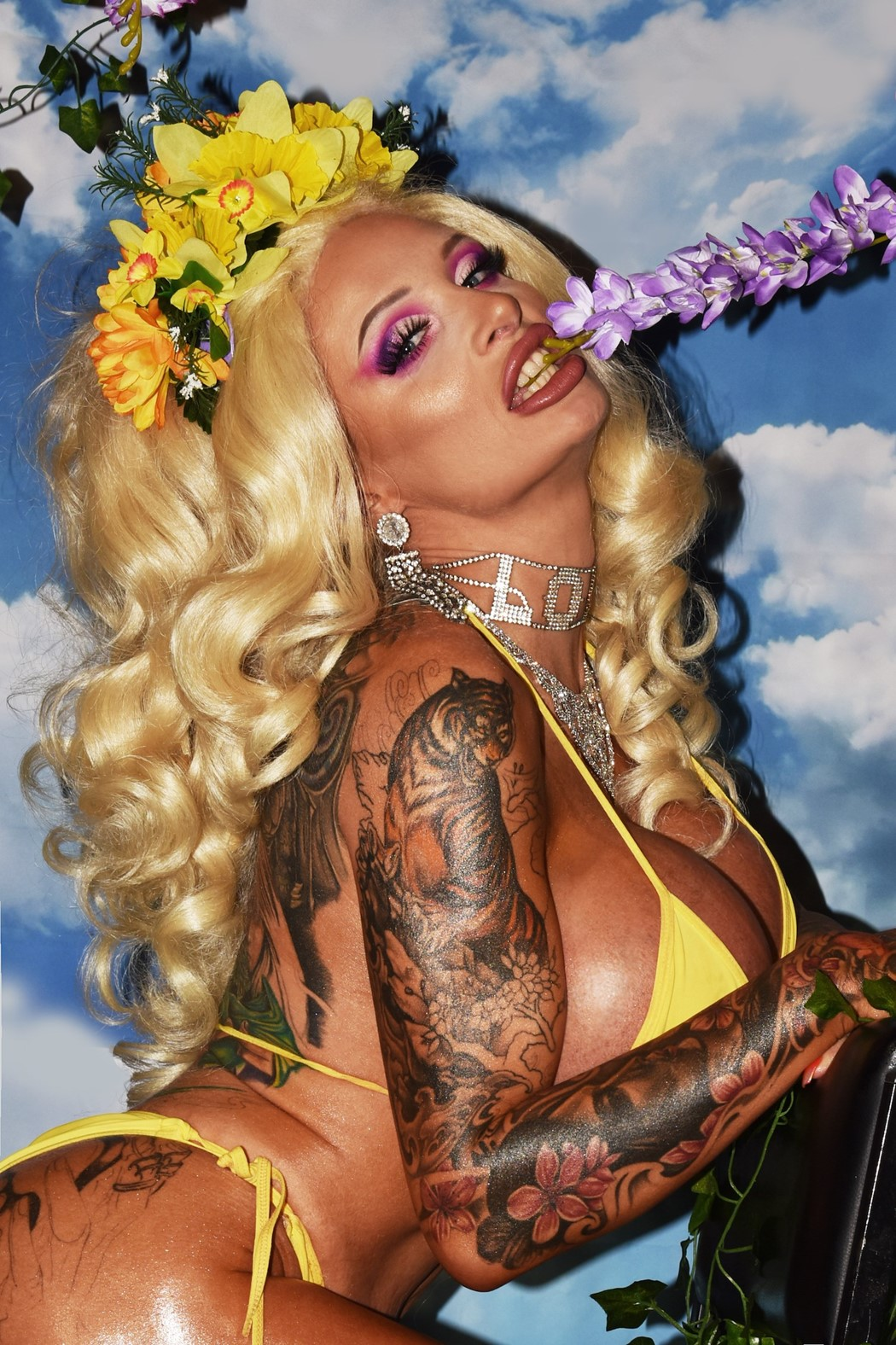
Keta Minaj (left) won on season 2 for her portrayal of Sophie Anderson (right).

Contestants of Drag Race Holland and their imitations
Season	Guest celebrities	Contestant	Impersonation	Result
1	Carlo Boszhard; Monica Geuze	Envy Peru	Patty Brard	WIN
1	Carlo Boszhard; Monica Geuze	ChelseaBoy	Joe Exotic	SAFE
1	Carlo Boszhard; Monica Geuze	Janey Jacké	Anny Schilder	SAFE
1	Carlo Boszhard; Monica Geuze	Ma'Ma Queen	Raven van Dorst	SAFE
1	Carlo Boszhard; Monica Geuze	Miss Abby OMG	Michella Kox	BTM
1	Carlo Boszhard; Monica Geuze	Sederginne	Mega Mindy (Note: Credited as Mega Mega Mindy.)	ELIM
2	Carlo Boszhard; Elise Schaap	Keta Minaj	Sophie Anderson	WIN
2	Carlo Boszhard; Elise Schaap	Vivaldi	Nikkie Plessen	WIN
2	Carlo Boszhard; Elise Schaap	My Little Puny	Marijke Helwegen	SAFE
2	Carlo Boszhard; Elise Schaap	Tabitha	Kim Holland	SAFE
2	Carlo Boszhard; Elise Schaap	The Countess	Louis XIV	SAFE
2	Carlo Boszhard; Elise Schaap	Vanessa Van Cartier	Queen Mathilde	SAFE
2	Carlo Boszhard; Elise Schaap	Ivy-Elyse	Cardi B	BTM
2	Carlo Boszhard; Elise Schaap	Love Masisi	Grace Jones	ELIM

=== Drag Race Italia ===
Contestants of Drag Race Italia and their imitations
Season	Guest celebrities	Contestant	Impersonation	Result
1	Chiara Francini; Mariano Gallo; Vincenzo De Lucia (Note: Special guest Vincenzo De Lucia took part in the Snatch Game portraying Barbara D'Urso, intervening in various sketches making parodies about the character and the show Pomeriggio Cinque.)	Le Riche	Valeria Marini	WIN
1	Chiara Francini; Mariano Gallo; Vincenzo De Lucia	Elecktra Bionic	Francesca Cipriani	SAFE
1	Chiara Francini; Mariano Gallo; Vincenzo De Lucia	Farida Kant	Alessandra Celentano	SAFE
1	Chiara Francini; Mariano Gallo; Vincenzo De Lucia	Luquisha Lubamba	Elettra Lamborghini	SAFE
1	Chiara Francini; Mariano Gallo; Vincenzo De Lucia	Ava Hangar	Alice and Ellen Kessler	BTM
1	Chiara Francini; Mariano Gallo; Vincenzo De Lucia	Divinity	Belén Rodríguez	ELIM
1	Chiara Francini; Mariano Gallo; Vincenzo De Lucia	Enorma Jean	Rita Levi-Montalcini	DISQ
2	Chiara Francini; Mariano Gallo	La Diamond	Cristiano Malgioglio	WIN
2	Chiara Francini; Mariano Gallo	Aura Eternal	Pamela Prati	SAFE
2	Chiara Francini; Mariano Gallo	Gioffré	Pingu (Note: Credited as Pinguino.)	SAFE
2	Chiara Francini; Mariano Gallo	Nehellenia	Elenoire Ferruzzi	SAFE
2	Chiara Francini; Mariano Gallo	La Petite Noire	Chiara Ferragni	SAFE
2	Chiara Francini; Mariano Gallo	Skandalove	Jill Cooper	SAFE
2	Chiara Francini; Mariano Gallo	Panthera Virus	Asia Argento	BTM
2	Chiara Francini; Mariano Gallo	Obama	Barbara D'Urso	ELIM
3	Chiara Francini; Mariano Gallo; Paolo Camilli; Tiziano Ferro (Note: Guest judge Tiziano Ferro took part in the Snatch Game as the host.)	Silvana Della Magliana	Sabrina Ferilli	WIN
3	Chiara Francini; Mariano Gallo; Paolo Camilli; Tiziano Ferro	Leila Yarn	The Head (Note: Credited as Il Testone.)	SAFE
3	Chiara Francini; Mariano Gallo; Paolo Camilli; Tiziano Ferro	Lina Galore	Amanda Lear	SAFE
3	Chiara Francini; Mariano Gallo; Paolo Camilli; Tiziano Ferro	Melissa Bianchini	Giacomo Urtis	SAFE
3	Chiara Francini; Mariano Gallo; Paolo Camilli; Tiziano Ferro	La Prada	Follettina Creation	SAFE
3	Chiara Francini; Mariano Gallo; Paolo Camilli; Tiziano Ferro	La Sheeva	Wanna Marchi	SAFE
3	Chiara Francini; Mariano Gallo; Paolo Camilli; Tiziano Ferro	Sypario	Thing (Note: Credited as Mano Drag.)	BTM
3	Chiara Francini; Mariano Gallo; Paolo Camilli; Tiziano Ferro	Sissy Lea	Patrizia Reggiani	ELIM

=== Drag Race México ===
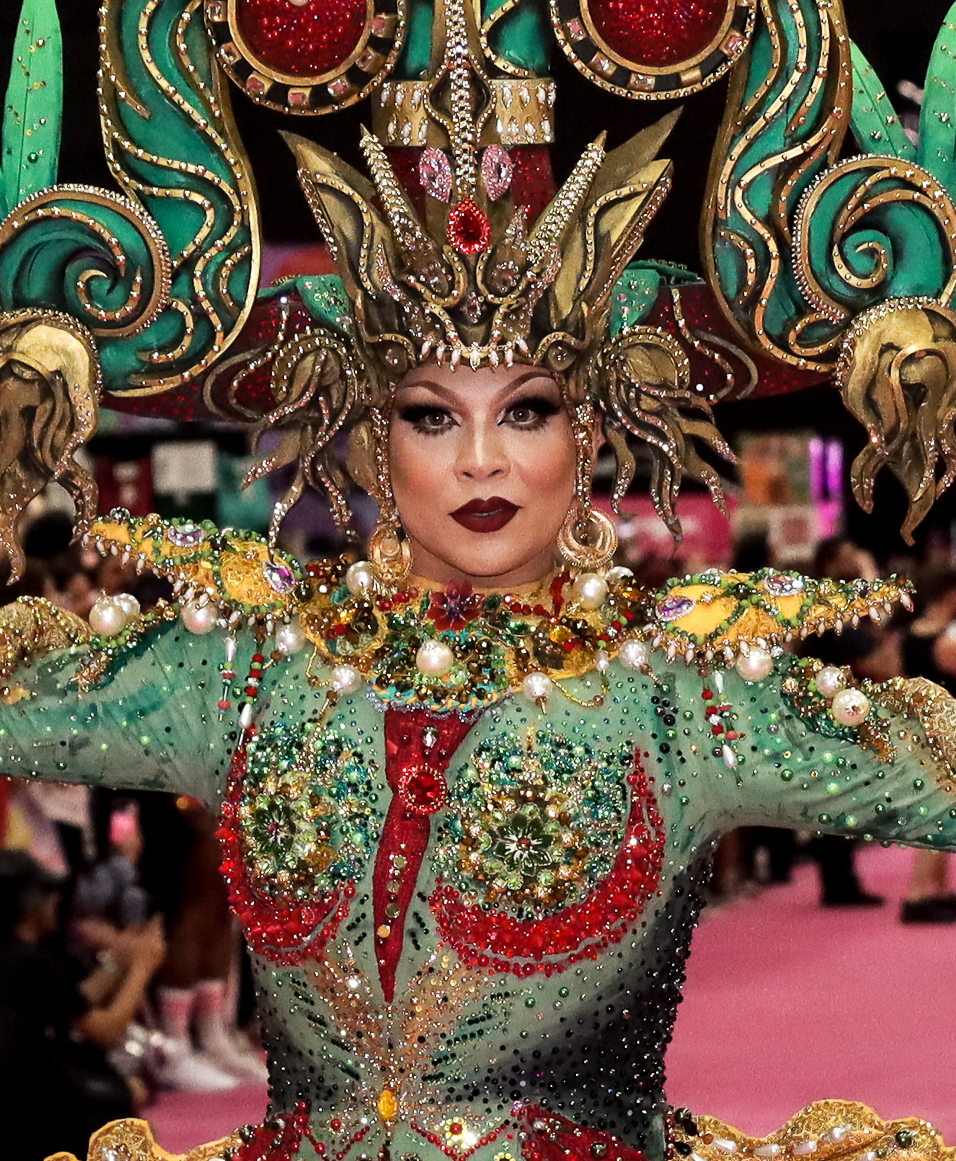
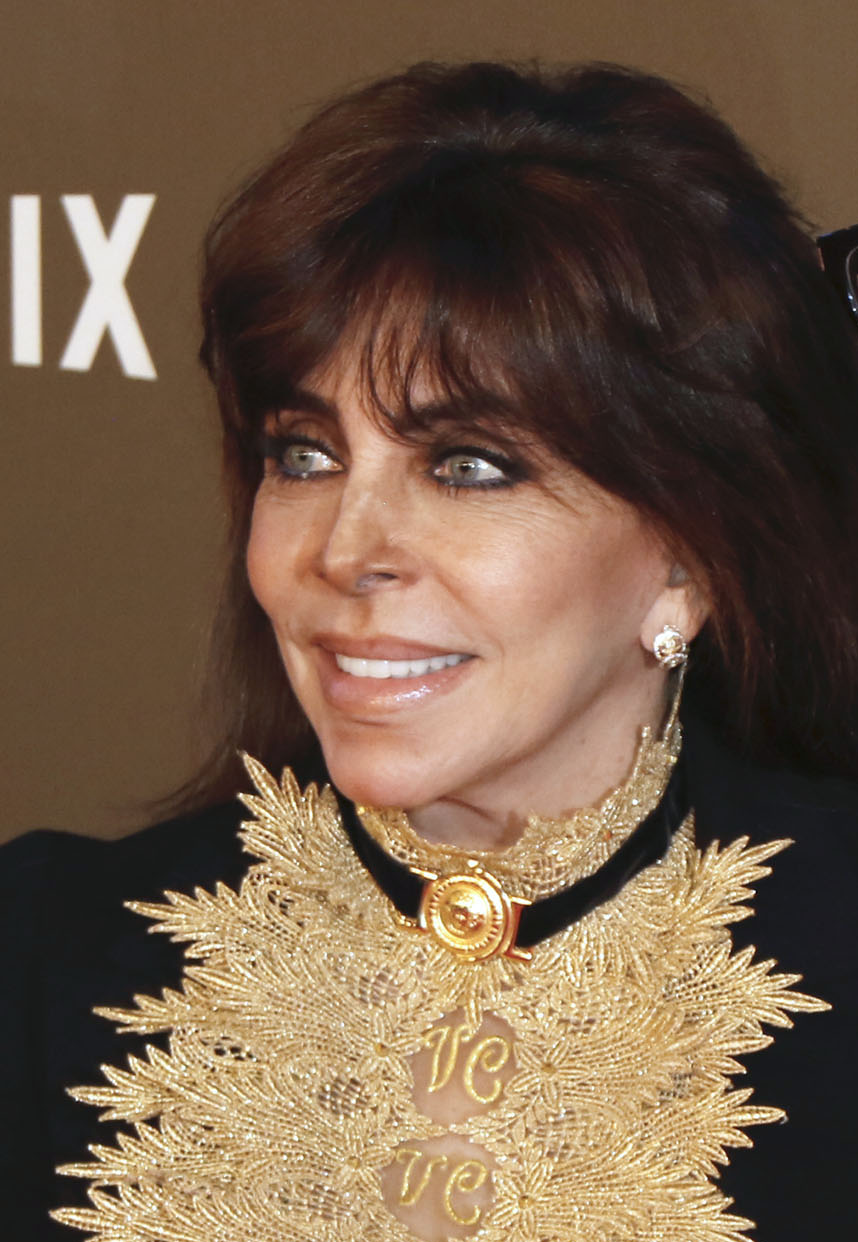
Cristian Peralta (left) won on season 1 for portraying Verónica Castro (right).

Cristian Peralta won the Snatch Game challenge on the first season of Drag Race México for portraying Verónica Castro. Luna Lansman won on the second season for impersonating José José.

Contestants of Drag Race México and their imitations
Season	Guest celebrities	Contestants	Impersonation	Result
1	Valentina; Oscar Madrazo	Cristian Peralta	Verónica Castro	WIN
1	Valentina; Oscar Madrazo	Lady Kero	Luna Gil	SAFE
1	Valentina; Oscar Madrazo	Margaret Y Ya	Martha Debayle	SAFE
1	Valentina; Oscar Madrazo	Matraka	Adela Micha	SAFE
1	Valentina; Oscar Madrazo	Regina Voce	Walter Mercado	SAFE
1	Valentina; Oscar Madrazo	Gala Varo	La Llorona	BTM
1	Valentina; Oscar Madrazo	Argennis	Gloria Trevi	ELIM
2	Turbulence; Burrita Burrona	Luna Lansman	José José	WIN
2	Turbulence; Burrita Burrona	Eva Blunt	Jesus of Iztapalapa	SAFE
2	Turbulence; Burrita Burrona	Horacio Potasio	Paco de Miguel	SAFE
2	Turbulence; Burrita Burrona	Jenary Bloom	Katy Perry	SAFE
2	Turbulence; Burrita Burrona	Leexa Fox	La Veneno	SAFE
2	Turbulence; Burrita Burrona	Suculenta	El Perro Bermúdez	SAFE
2	Turbulence; Burrita Burrona	Unique	Pedro Sola	SAFE
2	Turbulence; Burrita Burrona	Elektra Vandergeld	La Campu	BTM
2	Turbulence; Burrita Burrona	Ava Pocket	Paulina Rubio	ELIM

==== Drag Race México: Latina Royale ====
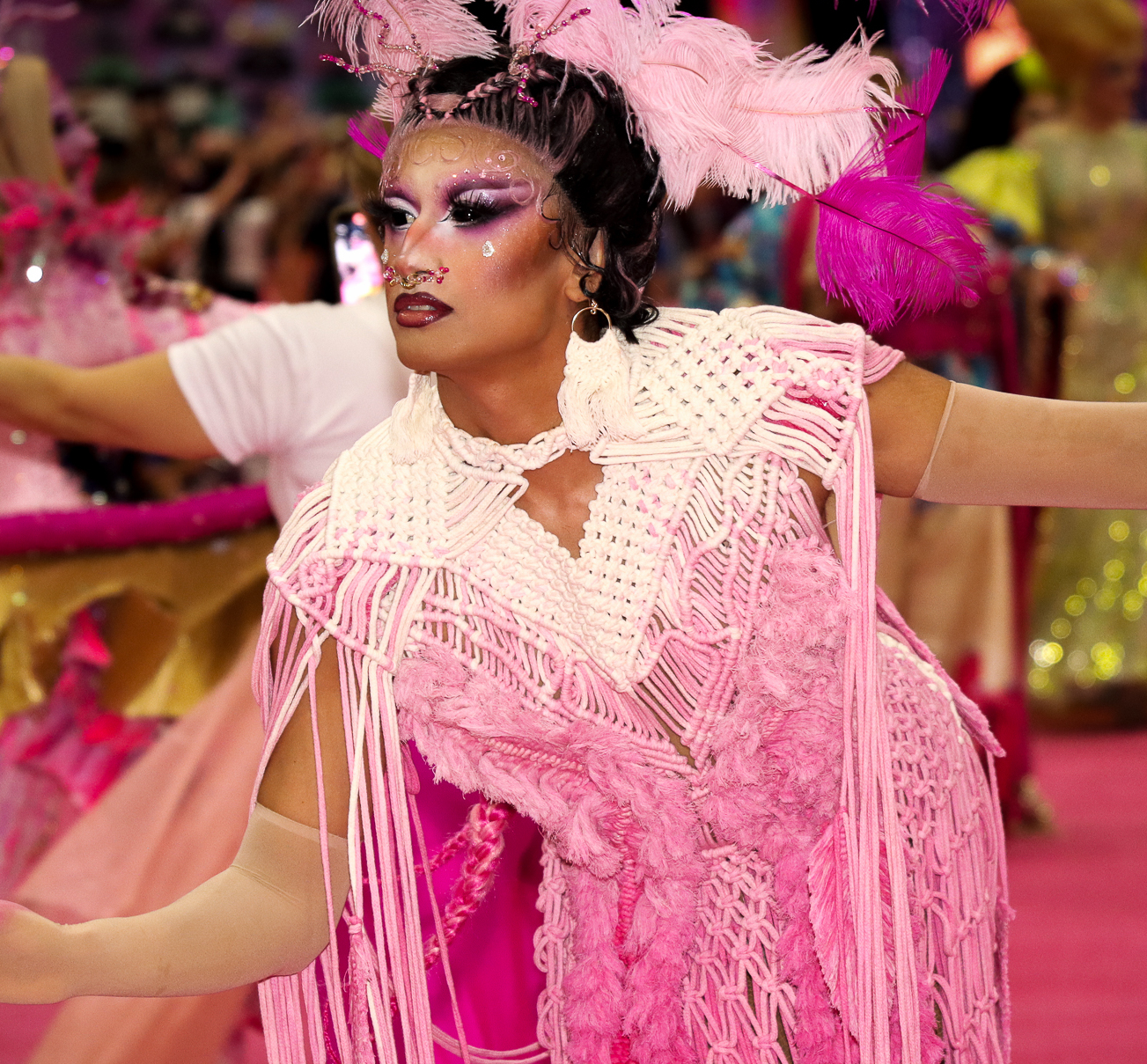
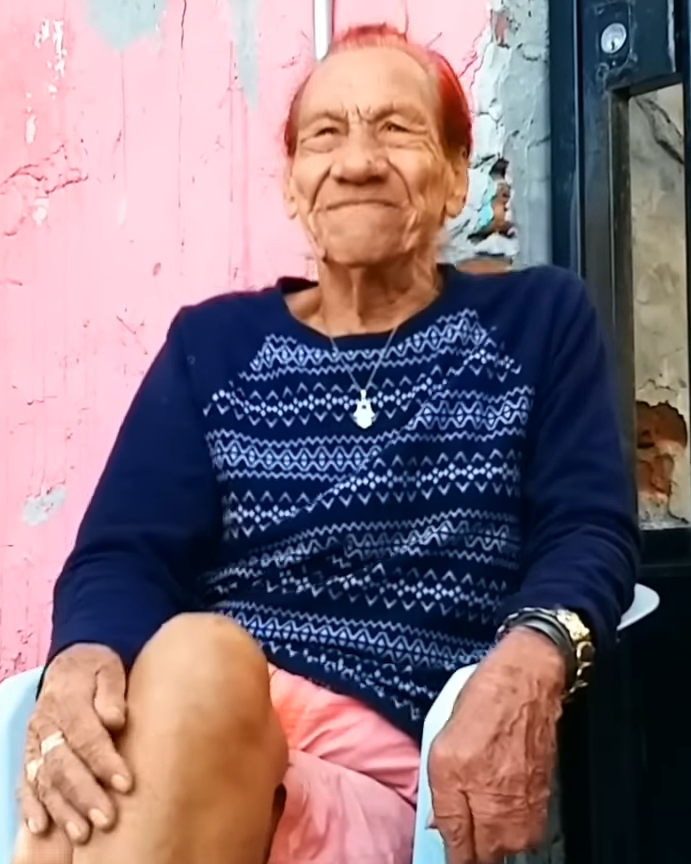
Matraka (left) won on Latina Royale season 1 for portraying La Gilbertona (right).
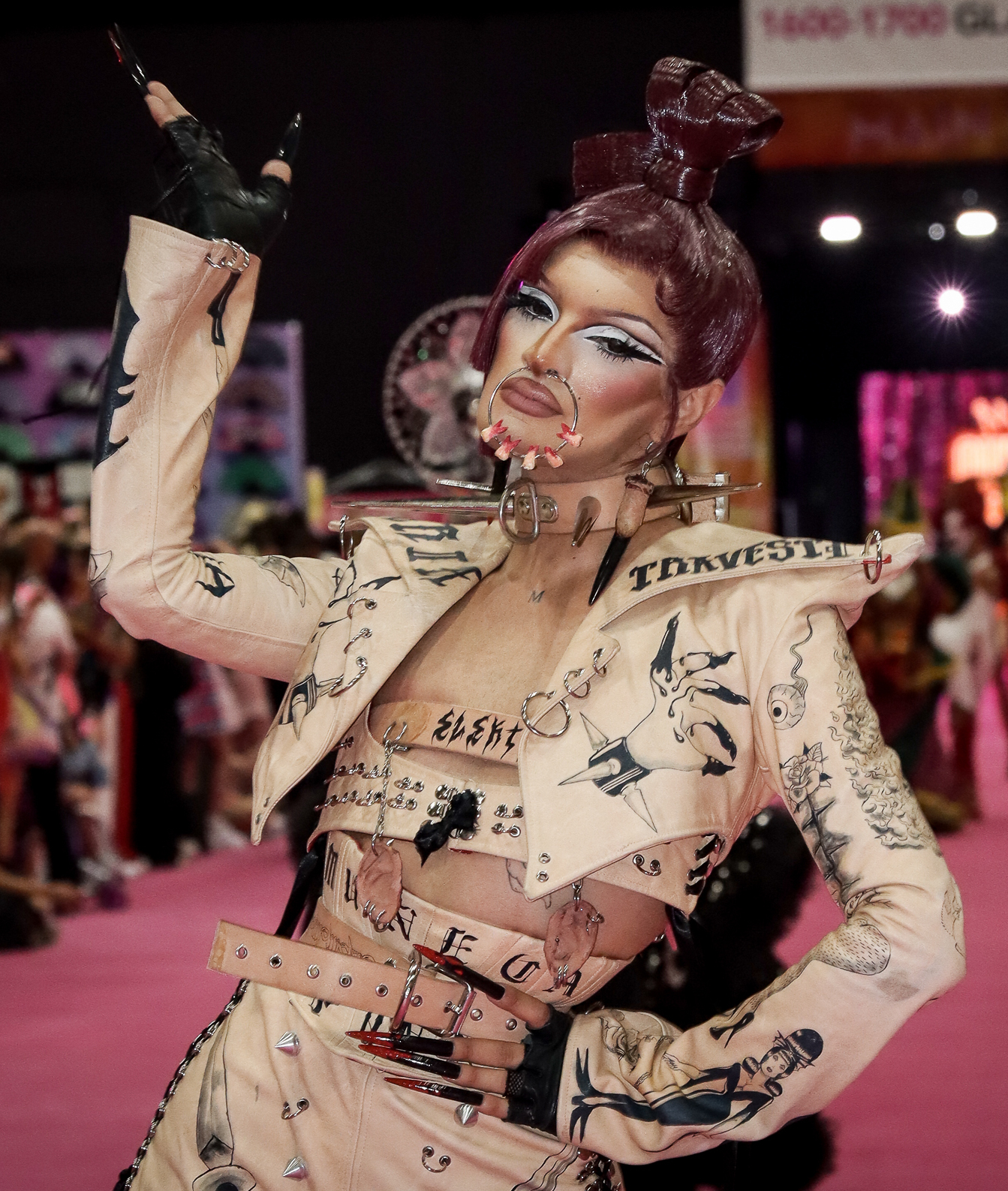
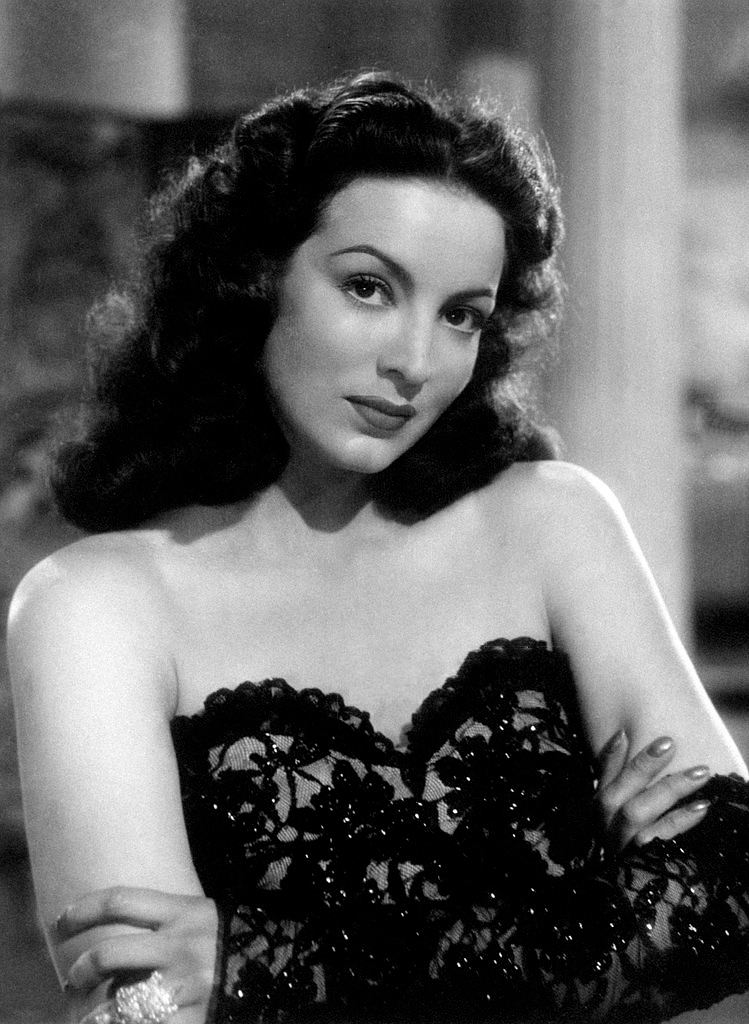
Elektra Vandergeld (left) also won on Latina Royale season 1 for her portrayal of María Félix (right).

Contestants of Drag Race México: Latina Royale and their imitations
Season	Type	Guest celebrities	Contestant	Impersonation	Result
1	Snatch Game de los Muertos	Lolita Banana; Cristian Peralta	Matraka	La Gilbertona	WIN
1	Snatch Game de los Muertos	Lolita Banana; Cristian Peralta	Elektra Vandergeld	María Félix	TOP2
1	Snatch Game de los Muertos	Lolita Banana; Cristian Peralta	Eva Blunt	Juan Gabriel	SAFE
1	Snatch Game de los Muertos	Lolita Banana; Cristian Peralta	Regina Voce	José José	SAFE
1	Snatch Game de los Muertos	Lolita Banana; Cristian Peralta	Xunami Muse	Celia Cruz	SAFE
1	Snatch Game de los Muertos	Lolita Banana; Cristian Peralta	Alexis Mateo	Burrita Burrona	BTM
1	Snatch Game de los Muertos	Lolita Banana; Cristian Peralta	Horacio Potasio	Juana Inés de la Cruz	BTM
1	Snatch Game de los Muertos	Lolita Banana; Cristian Peralta	Mariana Stars	Hugo Chávez	BTM
1	Snatch Game de los Muertos	Lolita Banana; Cristian Peralta	Miss Abby OMG	Cuca	ELIM

=== Drag Race Philippines ===
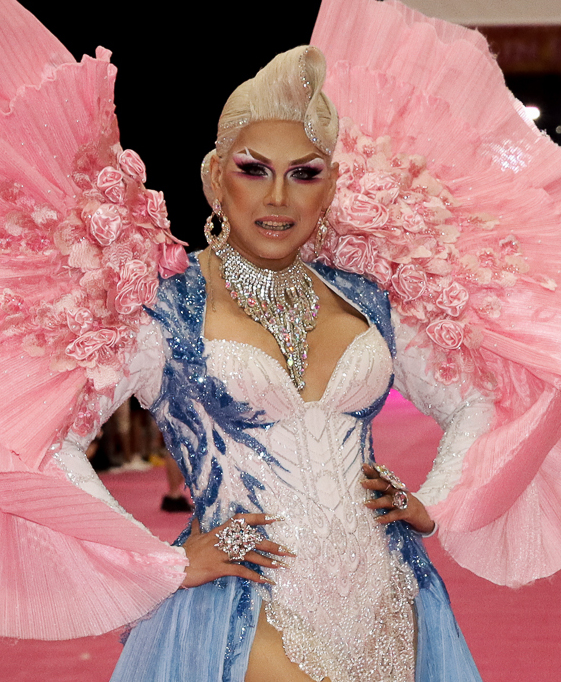
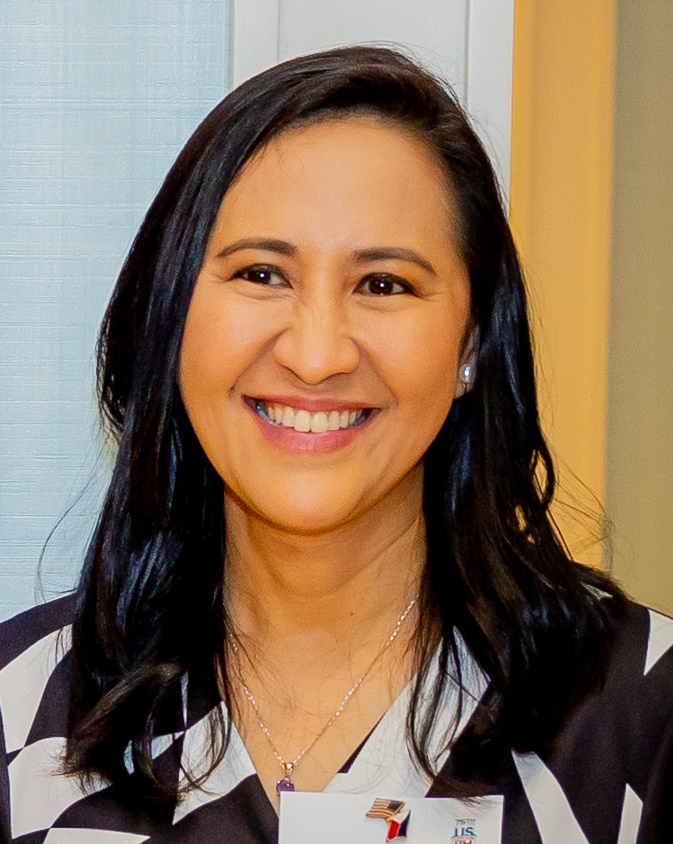
Captivating Katkat (left) won on season 2 for portraying Joy Belmonte (right).

Xilhouete won the Snatch Game challenge for impersonating Vicki Belo on the first season of Drag Race Philippines. Captivating Katkat and Angel won on the second and third seasons for impersonating Joy Belmonte and Maria Clara, respectively.

Contestants of Drag Race Philippines and their imitations
Season	Type	Guests	Contestant	Impersonation	Result
1	Snatch Game KNB?	Jon Santos; Jojie Dingcong	Xilhouete	Vicki Belo	WIN
1	Snatch Game KNB?	Jon Santos; Jojie Dingcong	Eva Le Queen	Rufa Mae Quinto	SAFE
1	Snatch Game KNB?	Jon Santos; Jojie Dingcong	Marina Summers	Gloria Macapagal Arroyo	SAFE
1	Snatch Game KNB?	Jon Santos; Jojie Dingcong	Precious Paula Nicole	Charo Santos-Concio	SAFE
1	Snatch Game KNB?	Jon Santos; Jojie Dingcong	Viñas DeLuxe	Kris Aquino	SAFE
1	Snatch Game KNB?	Jon Santos; Jojie Dingcong	Viñas DeLuxe	Boy Abunda	SAFE
1	Snatch Game KNB?	Jon Santos; Jojie Dingcong	Brigiding	Elizabeth Ramsey	BTM
1	Snatch Game KNB?	Jon Santos; Jojie Dingcong	Minty Fresh	Maria Sofia Love	BTM
2	Snatch Game KNB?	Jon Santos; Kim Molina	Captivating Katkat	Joy Belmonte	WIN
2	Snatch Game KNB?	Jon Santos; Kim Molina	Arizona Brandy	Adele	SAFE
2	Snatch Game KNB?	Jon Santos; Kim Molina	Bernie	Madam Inutz	SAFE
2	Snatch Game KNB?	Jon Santos; Kim Molina	Hana Beshie	Jessica Soho	SAFE
2	Snatch Game KNB?	Jon Santos; Kim Molina	M1ss Jade So	Queen Dura	SAFE
2	Snatch Game KNB?	Jon Santos; Kim Molina	ØV Cünt	Zenaida Seva	SAFE
2	Snatch Game KNB?	Jon Santos; Kim Molina	DeeDee Marié Holliday	Meryl Streep (Note: as Miranda Priestly from The Devil Wears Prada)	BTM
2	Snatch Game KNB?	Jon Santos; Kim Molina	DeeDee Marié Holliday	Jennifer Coolidge	BTM
2	Snatch Game KNB?	Jon Santos; Kim Molina	Matilduh	Sassa Gurl	BTM
2	Snatch Game KNB?	Jon Santos; Kim Molina	Veruschka Levels	Dionisia Dapidran-Pacquiao	ELIM
3	Snatch Game KNB?	Jon Santos; Kyle Echarri	Angel	Maria Clara	WIN
3	Snatch Game KNB?	Jon Santos; Kyle Echarri	John Fedellaga	Angel Locsin	SAFE
3	Snatch Game KNB?	Jon Santos; Kyle Echarri	Khianna	Baron Geisler	SAFE
3	Snatch Game KNB?	Jon Santos; Kyle Echarri	Maxie	Babae sa Balete Drive	SAFE
3	Snatch Game KNB?	Jon Santos; Kyle Echarri	Myx Chanel	Rufa Mae Quinto	SAFE
3	Snatch Game KNB?	Jon Santos; Kyle Echarri	Popstar Bench	Sarah Geronimo	SAFE
3	Snatch Game KNB?	Jon Santos; Kyle Echarri	Tita Baby	Kamatayan	SAFE
3	Snatch Game KNB?	Jon Santos; Kyle Echarri	Zymba Ding	Wilma Doesnt	BTM
3	Snatch Game KNB?	Jon Santos; Kyle Echarri	J Quinn	Confucius	ELIM
4	Snatch Game KNB?	KaladKaren; BJ Pascual	Bhorj Gum	Jennifer Coolidge	WIN
4	Snatch Game KNB?	KaladKaren; BJ Pascual	Katana	Jay Costura	SAFE
4	Snatch Game KNB?	KaladKaren; BJ Pascual	Manza	Aira Bermudez	SAFE
4	Snatch Game KNB?	KaladKaren; BJ Pascual	Maureen Biology	Vilma Santos	SAFE
4	Snatch Game KNB?	KaladKaren; BJ Pascual	Merckz	Janina San Miguel	SAFE
4	Snatch Game KNB?	KaladKaren; BJ Pascual	Taylor Sheesh	Ed Caluag	SAFE
4	Snatch Game KNB?	KaladKaren; BJ Pascual	Valeria	Maria Sofia Love	SAFE
4	Snatch Game KNB?	KaladKaren; BJ Pascual	Andy Crocker	Marian Rivera	BTM
4	Snatch Game KNB?	KaladKaren; BJ Pascual	Bombalicious Eklaver	Roderick Paulate	ELIM
4	Snatch Game KNB?	KaladKaren; BJ Pascual	Rufa Mae Quinto (Note: Rufa Mae Quinto joined the contestants as an additional panelist, portraying herself.)		—N/a

==== Drag Race Philippines: Slaysian Royale ====
On the spin-off series Drag Race Philippines: Slaysian Royale, contestants impersonated celebrities in a version of Snatch Game called "Snatch Elections".

Contestants of Drag Race Philippines: Slaysian Royale and their imitations
Season	Type	Guests	Contestant	Impersonation	Result
1	Snatch Elections	—N/a	Yuhua	Anna Delvey	WIN
1	Snatch Elections	—N/a	Brigiding	Maria Ressa	TOP3
1	Snatch Elections	—N/a	Viñas DeLuxe	Sara Duterte	TOP3
1	Snatch Elections	—N/a	Arizona Brandy	Lyn (Note: from the viral video Lyn from Las Vegas, also known as Las Vegas Model Is Hiring!)	SAFE
1	Snatch Elections	—N/a	Suki Doll	Lyn May	SAFE
1	Snatch Elections	—N/a	Khianna	Toni Fowler	BTM
1	Snatch Elections	—N/a	Siam Phusri	Lisa (Note: as Mook from The White Lotus)	ELIM

=== Drag Race Sverige ===
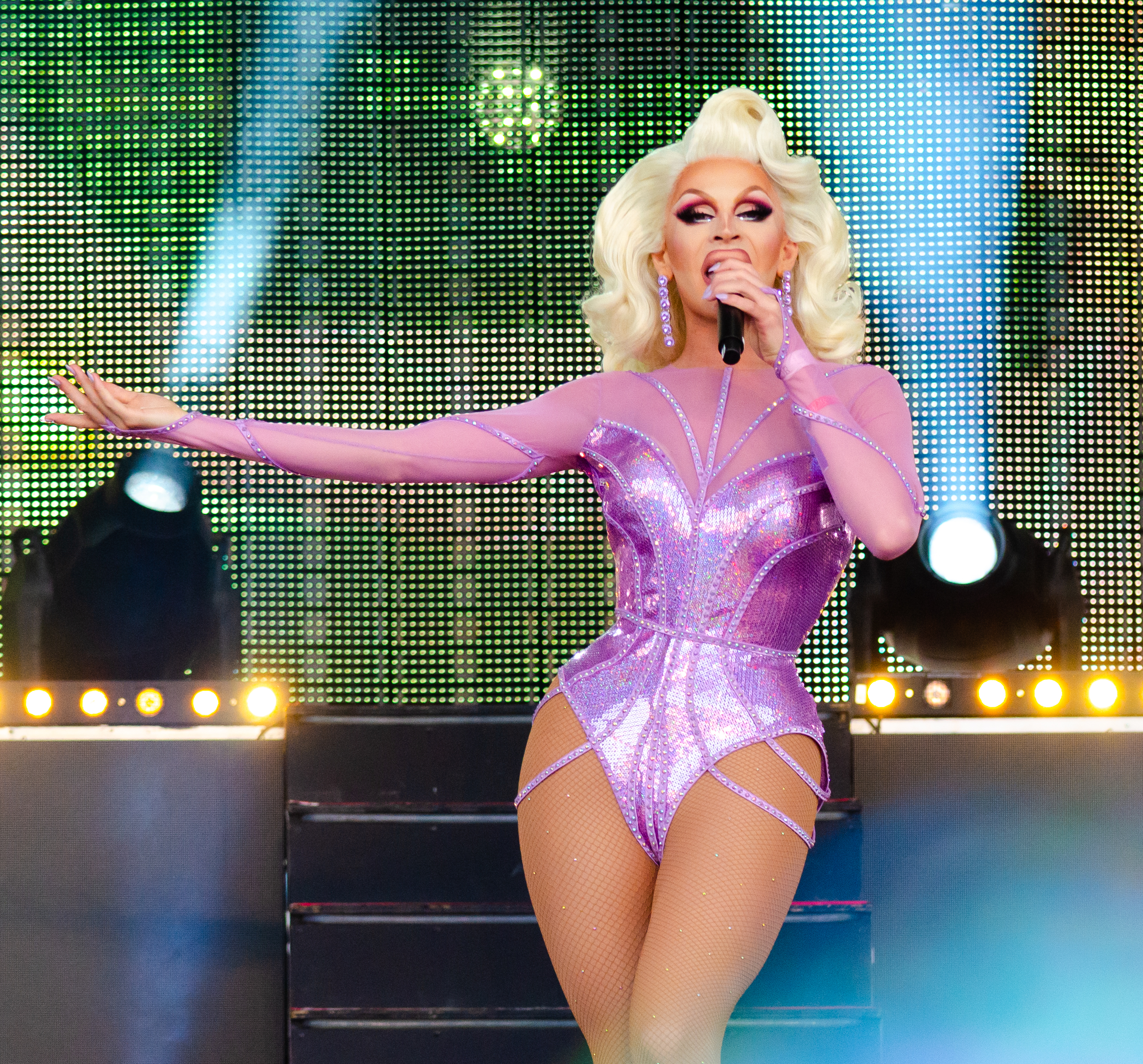
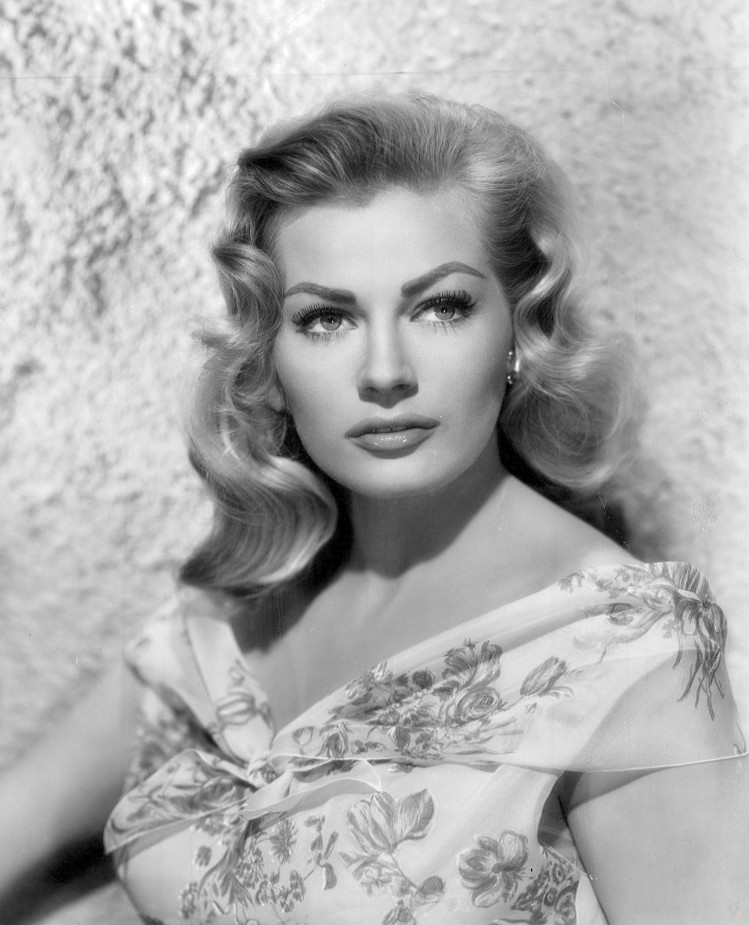
Admira Thunderpussy (left) won on season 1 for her portrayal of Anita Ekberg (right).

Contestants of Drag Race Sverige and their imitations
Season	Guest celebrities	Contestant	Impersonation	Result
1	Arantxa Alvarez; Omar Rudberg	Admira Thunderpussy	Anita Ekberg	WIN
1	Arantxa Alvarez; Omar Rudberg	Elecktra	Anna Anka	SAFE
1	Arantxa Alvarez; Omar Rudberg	Fontana	Britney Spears	SAFE
1	Arantxa Alvarez; Omar Rudberg	Santana Sexmachine	Gunilla Persson	SAFE
1	Arantxa Alvarez; Omar Rudberg	Vanity Vain	Anna Book	SAFE
1	Arantxa Alvarez; Omar Rudberg	Antonina Nutshell	Sandra Dahlberg	BTM
1	Arantxa Alvarez; Omar Rudberg	Imaa Queen	Carola	ELIM

=== Drag Race Thailand ===
Contestants of Drag Race Thailand and their imitations
Season	Guest celebrities	Contestant	Impersonation	Result
1	Metinee Kingpayom; Polpat Asavaprapha	Natalia Pliacam	Sumanee Gunakasem	WIN
1	Metinee Kingpayom; Polpat Asavaprapha	B Ella	Leena Jung	SAFE
1	Metinee Kingpayom; Polpat Asavaprapha	Amadiva	Cherprang Areekul	SAFE
1	Metinee Kingpayom; Polpat Asavaprapha	Dearis Doll	Jintara Poonlarp	SAFE
1	Metinee Kingpayom; Polpat Asavaprapha	Année Maywong	Lukkade Metinee	BTM
1	Metinee Kingpayom; Polpat Asavaprapha	JAJA	Nicki Minaj	BTM
1	Metinee Kingpayom; Polpat Asavaprapha	Petchra	Amy Winehouse	ELIM
2	Metinee Kingpayom; Khemanit "Pancake" Jamikorn	Angele Anang	Vatanika	RW
2	Metinee Kingpayom; Khemanit "Pancake" Jamikorn	Bandit	Ornapha Krisadee	SAFE
2	Metinee Kingpayom; Khemanit "Pancake" Jamikorn	Vanda Miss Joaquim	Cardi B	SAFE
2	Metinee Kingpayom; Khemanit "Pancake" Jamikorn	Srimala	Sophia La	BTM
2	Metinee Kingpayom; Khemanit "Pancake" Jamikorn	Tormai	Thapanee Ietsrichai	WEL
3	Metinee Kingpayom; Cindy Bishop	Spicy Sunshine	Pa Tue	WIN
3	Metinee Kingpayom; Cindy Bishop	Frankie Wonga	Aang Terdterng	SAFE
3	Metinee Kingpayom; Cindy Bishop	Gawdland	Bryan Tan	SAFE
3	Metinee Kingpayom; Cindy Bishop	Nane Sphera	Chao Korkaew	SAFE
3	Metinee Kingpayom; Cindy Bishop	Siam Phusri	Pumpuang Duangjan	SAFE
3	Metinee Kingpayom; Cindy Bishop	Zepee	Tik Klinsee	SAFE
3	Metinee Kingpayom; Cindy Bishop	Gigi Ferocious	Rihanna	BTM
3	Metinee Kingpayom; Cindy Bishop	Benze Diva	Marilyn Monroe	ELIM

=== RuPaul's Drag Race UK ===
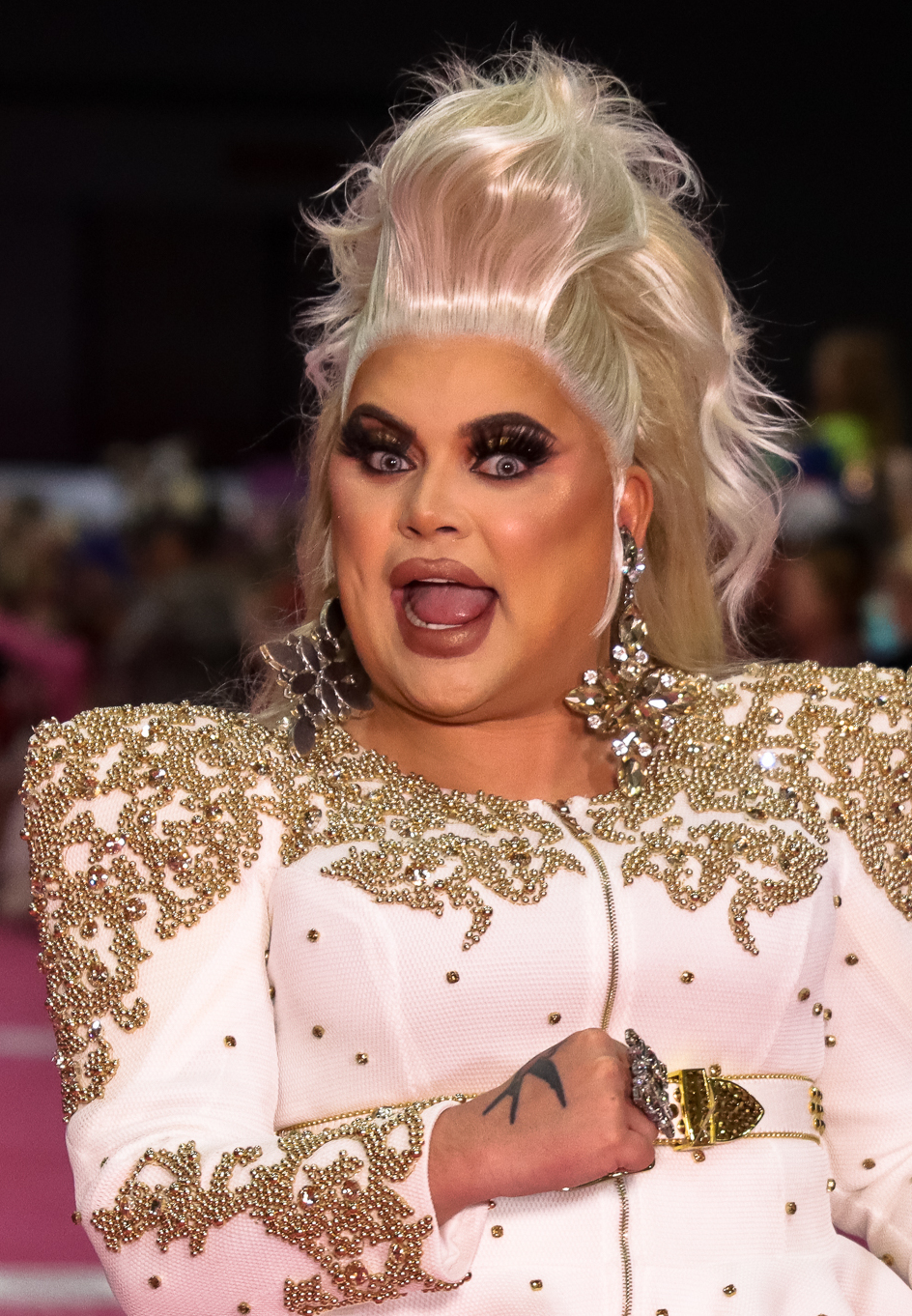
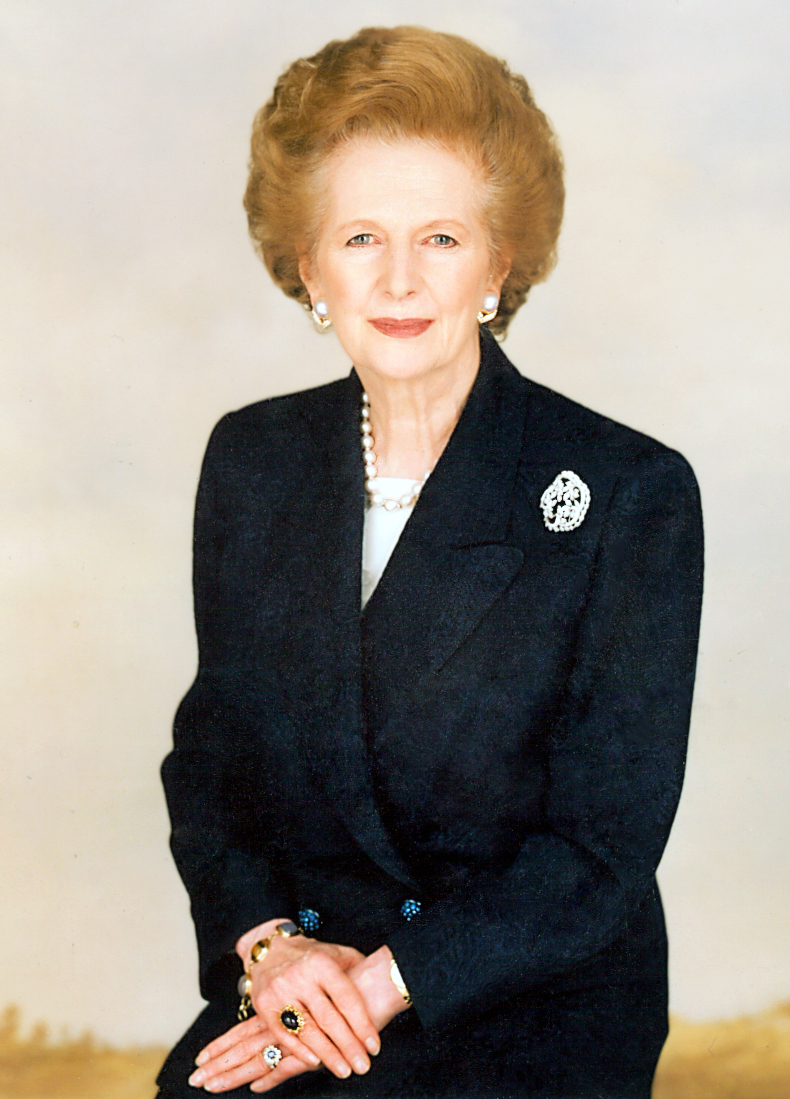
Baga Chipz (left) won on series 1 for her portrayal of Margaret Thatcher (right).
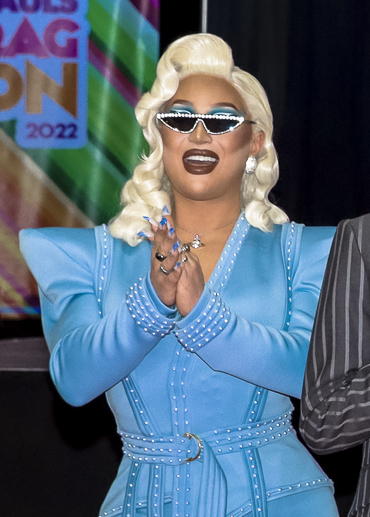
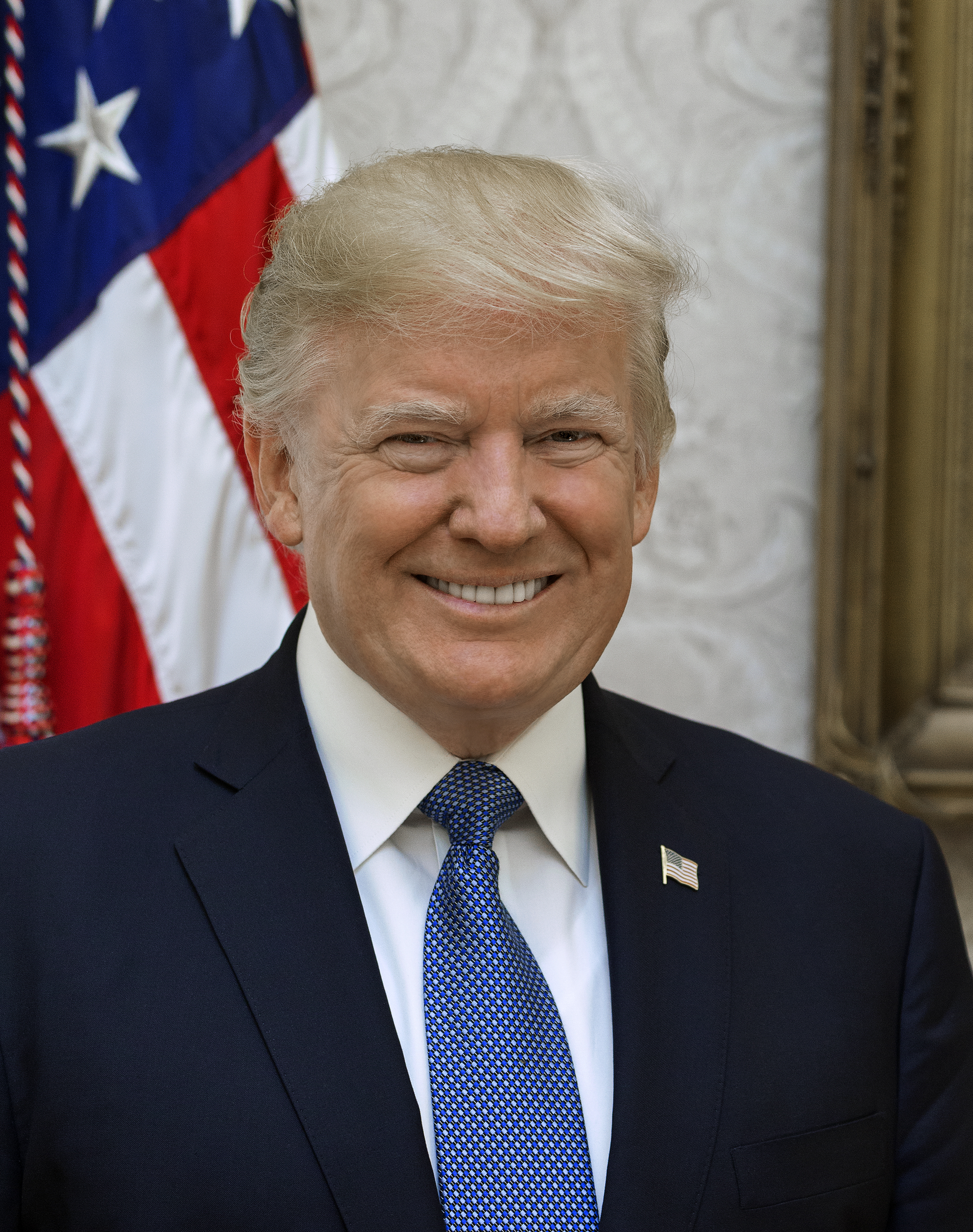
The Vivienne (left) also won on series 1 for her portrayal of Donald Trump (right).
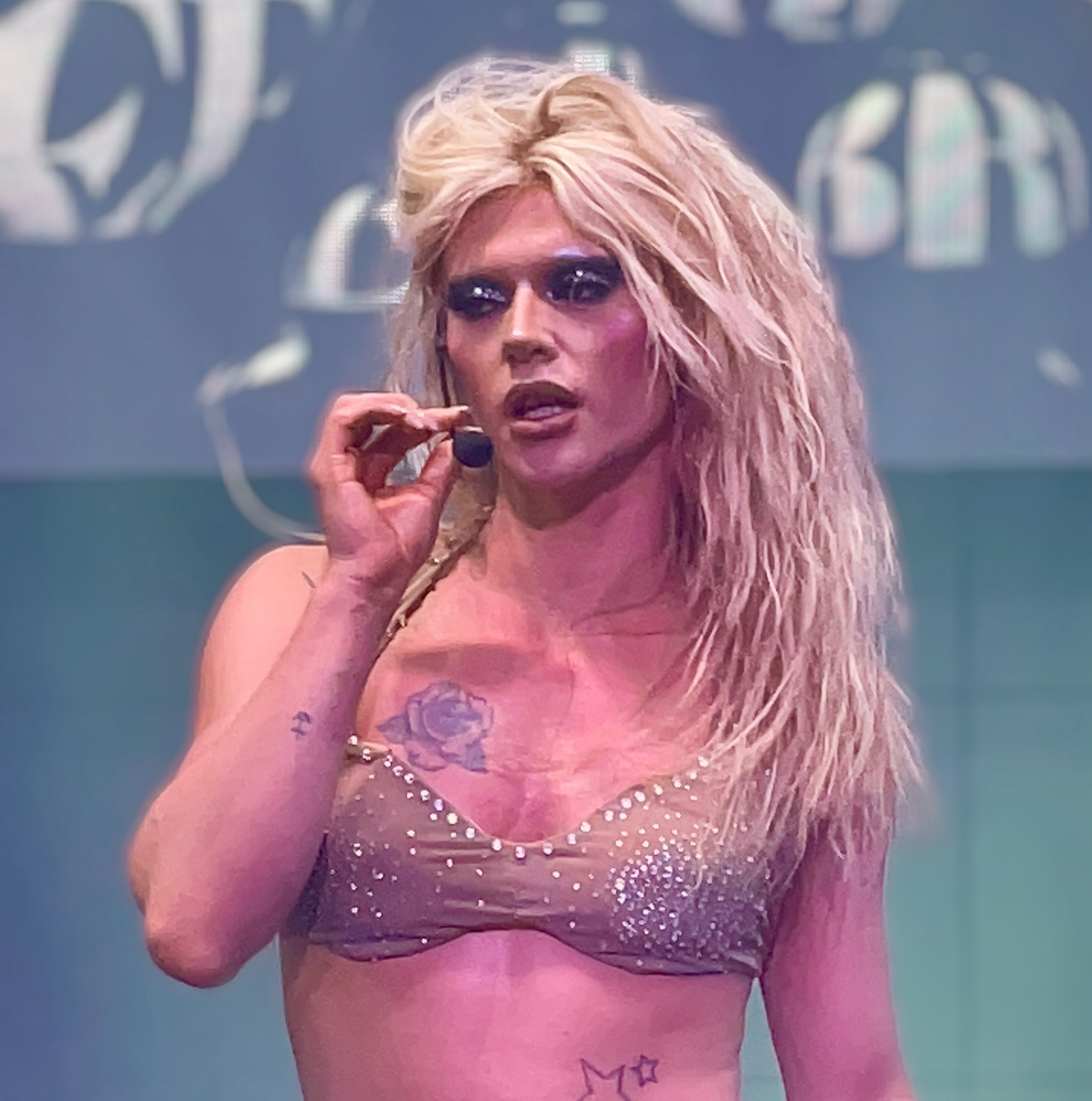
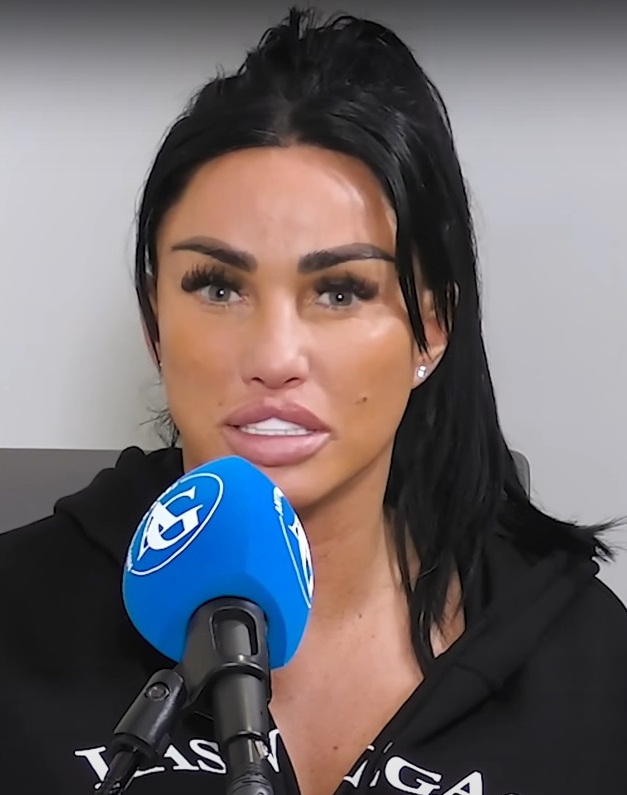
Bimini Bon-Boulash (left) won on series 2 for her portrayal of Katie Price (right).
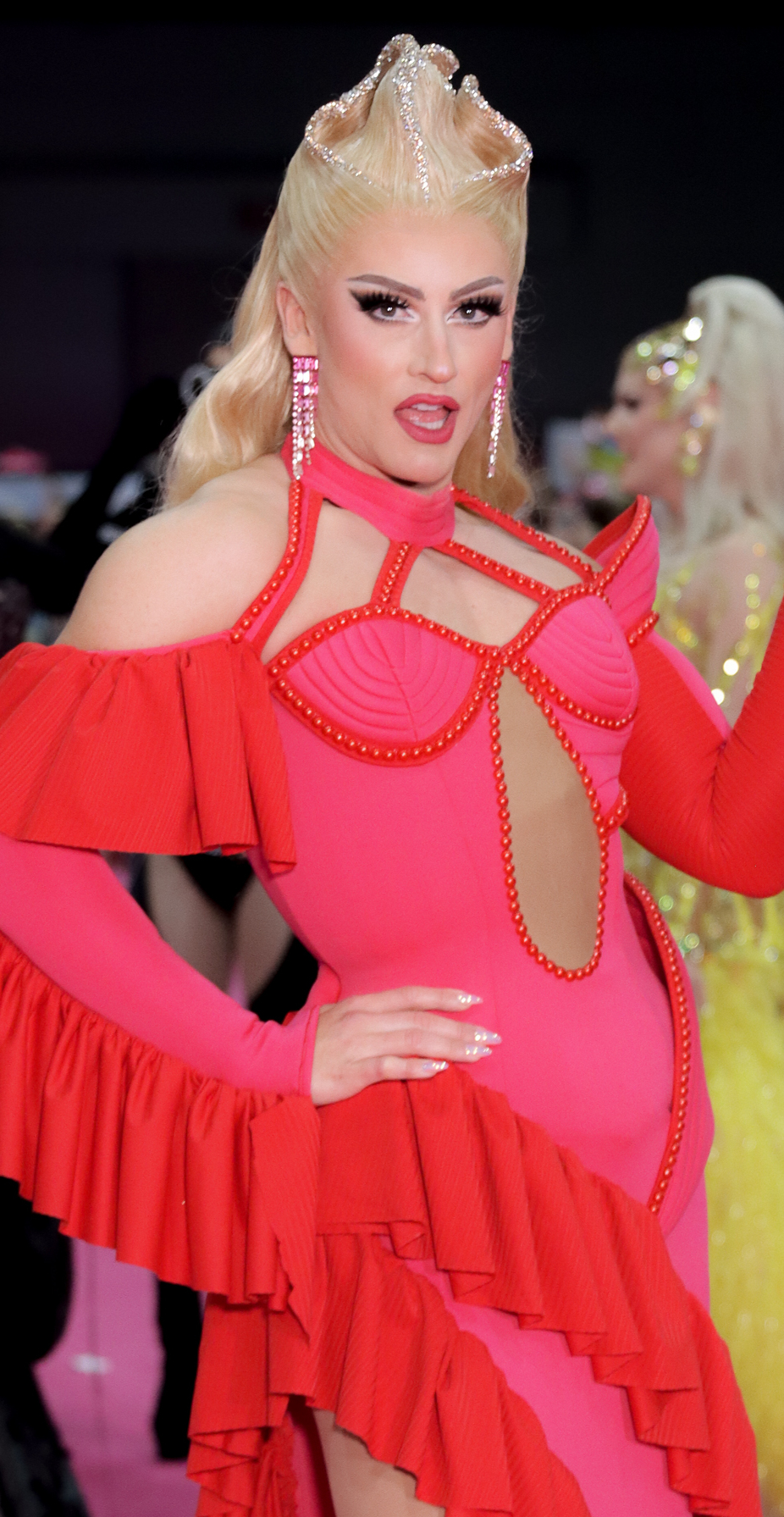
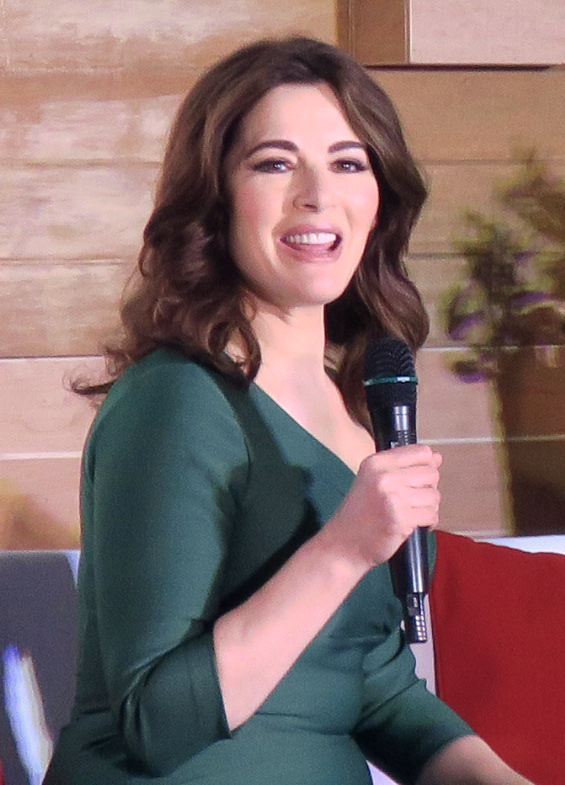
Ella Vaday (left) won on series 3 for her portrayal of Nigella Lawson (right).
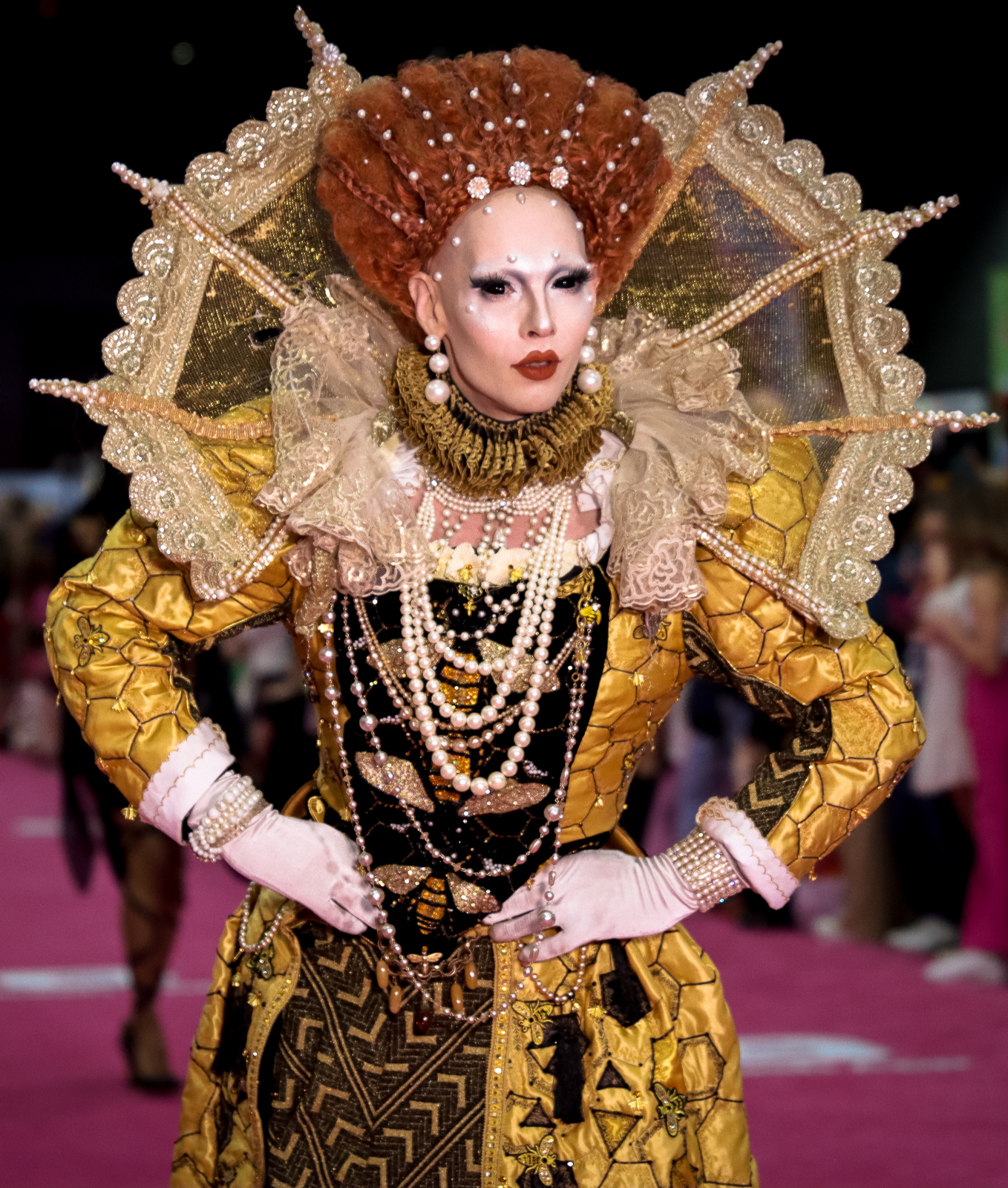
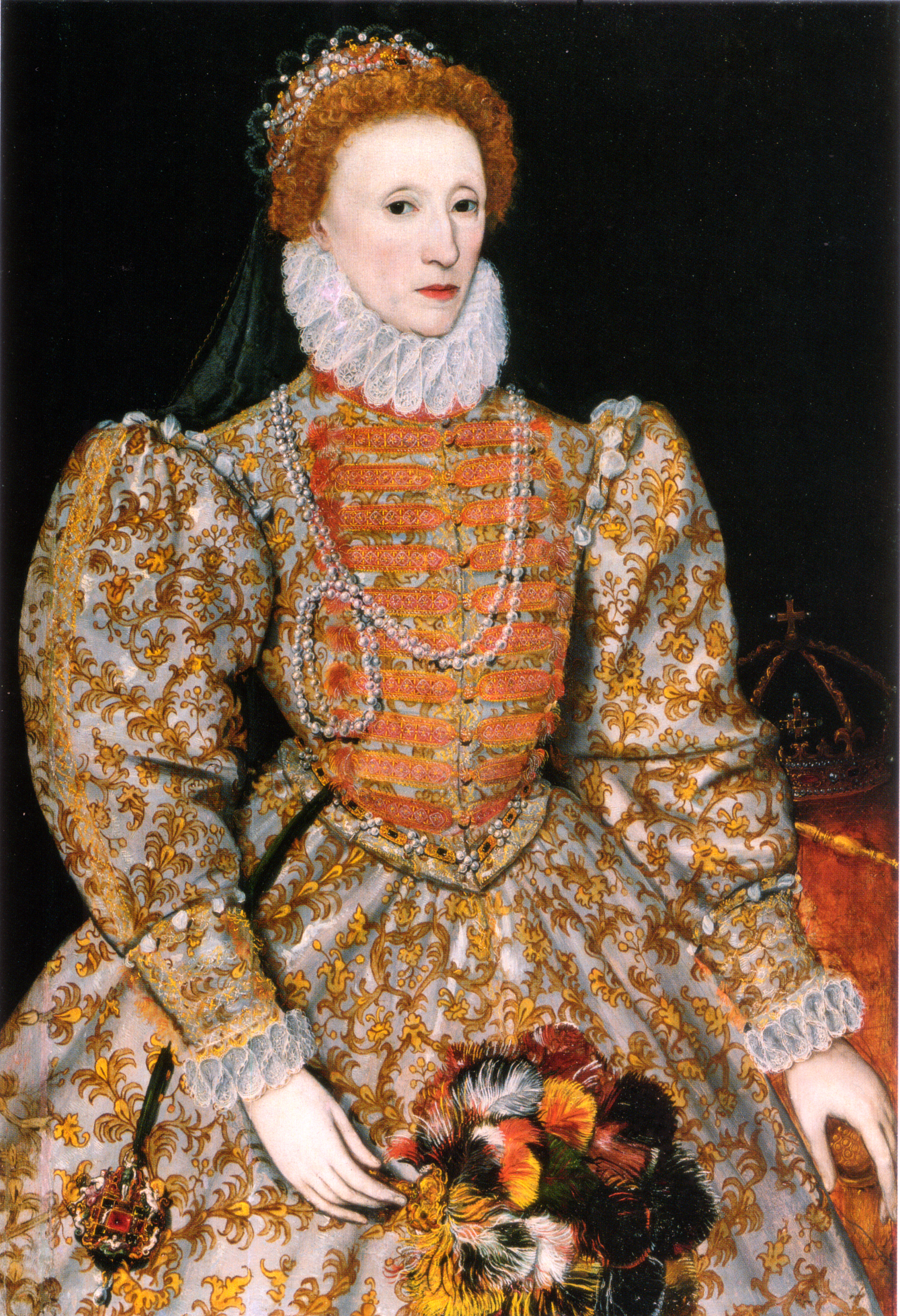
Cheddar Gorgeous (left) won on series 4 for her portrayal of Elizabeth I (right).

Contestants of RuPaul's Drag Race UK and their imitations
Series	Type	Guest celebrities	Contestant	Impersonation	Result
1	—N/a	Lorraine Kelly; Stacey Dooley	Baga Chipz	Margaret Thatcher	WIN
1	—N/a	Lorraine Kelly; Stacey Dooley	The Vivienne	Donald Trump	WIN
1	—N/a	Lorraine Kelly; Stacey Dooley	Blu Hydrangea	Mary Berry	SAFE
1	—N/a	Lorraine Kelly; Stacey Dooley	Cheryl Hole	Gemma Collins	SAFE
1	—N/a	Lorraine Kelly; Stacey Dooley	Divina de Campo	Julia Child	SAFE
1	—N/a	Lorraine Kelly; Stacey Dooley	Crystal	Rue McClanahan	BTM
1	—N/a	Lorraine Kelly; Stacey Dooley	Sum Ting Wong	Sir David Attenborough	ELIM
2	—N/a	Gemma Collins; Michelle Visage	Bimini Bon-Boulash	Katie Price	WIN
2	—N/a	Gemma Collins; Michelle Visage	A'Whora	Louie Spence	SAFE
2	—N/a	Gemma Collins; Michelle Visage	Ellie Diamond	Matt Lucas (Note: as Vicky Pollard from Little Britain)	SAFE
2	—N/a	Gemma Collins; Michelle Visage	Sister Sister	Sally Morgan (Note: Credited as Psychic Sally.)	SAFE
2	—N/a	Gemma Collins; Michelle Visage	Tayce	Jane Turner (Note: as Kath Day-Knight from Kath & Kim)	SAFE
2	—N/a	Gemma Collins; Michelle Visage	Lawrence Chaney	Miriam Margolyes	BTM
2	—N/a	Gemma Collins; Michelle Visage	Tia Kofi	Mel B	ELIM
3	—N/a	Nadine Coyle; Judi Love	Ella Vaday	Nigella Lawson	WIN
3	—N/a	Nadine Coyle; Judi Love	Kitty Scott-Claus	Gemma Collins	SAFE
3	—N/a	Nadine Coyle; Judi Love	Krystal Versace	Selina Mosinski (Note: as Sue Tuke from Charity Shop Sue)	SAFE
3	—N/a	Nadine Coyle; Judi Love	Scarlett Harlett	Macaulay Culkin (Note: as Kevin McCallister from the Home Alone films)	SAFE
3	—N/a	Nadine Coyle; Judi Love	Vanity Milan	Jocelyn Jee Esien (Note: as Gladys Kingston from Little Miss Jocelyn)	SAFE
3	—N/a	Nadine Coyle; Judi Love	Choriza May	Margarita Pracatan	ELIM
3	—N/a	Nadine Coyle; Judi Love	River Medway	Amy Childs	ELIM
4	Strictly Come Snatch Game	AJ Odudu; Tess Daly	Cheddar Gorgeous	Queen Elizabeth I	WIN
4	Strictly Come Snatch Game	AJ Odudu; Tess Daly	Dakota Schiffer	Pete Burns	SAFE
4	Strictly Come Snatch Game	AJ Odudu; Tess Daly	Danny Beard	Cilla Black	SAFE
4	Strictly Come Snatch Game	AJ Odudu; Tess Daly	Jonbers Blonde	Saint Patrick (Note: Credited as Sainty Paddy.)	SAFE
4	Strictly Come Snatch Game	AJ Odudu; Tess Daly	Pixie Polite	Shirley Bassey	SAFE
4	Strictly Come Snatch Game	AJ Odudu; Tess Daly	Black Peppa	Lil Nas X	BTM
4	Strictly Come Snatch Game	AJ Odudu; Tess Daly	Le Fil	Marie Kondo	ELIM
5	—N/a	Alexandra Burke; Carol Vorderman	Ginger Johnson	Barbara Cartland	WIN
5	—N/a	Alexandra Burke; Carol Vorderman	Cara Melle	Dionne Warwick	SAFE
5	—N/a	Alexandra Burke; Carol Vorderman	Kate Butch	Kate Bush	SAFE
5	—N/a	Alexandra Burke; Carol Vorderman	Michael Marouli	Catherine Tate (Note: as Bernie and Derek Faye from The Catherine Tate Show)	SAFE
5	—N/a	Alexandra Burke; Carol Vorderman	Tomara Thomas	Robin Williams (Note: as Mrs. Doubtfire from Mrs. Doubtfire)	SAFE
5	—N/a	Alexandra Burke; Carol Vorderman	DeDeLicious	Lady Colin Campbell	BTM
5	—N/a	Alexandra Burke; Carol Vorderman	Vicki Vivacious	Fanny Cradock	ELIM
6	—N/a	Jon Lee; Rachel Stevens	Kyran Thrax	Elvis Presley	WIN
6	—N/a	Jon Lee; Rachel Stevens	La Voix	Liza Minnelli	WIN
6	—N/a	Jon Lee; Rachel Stevens	Actavia	Welsh Dragon	SAFE
6	—N/a	Jon Lee; Rachel Stevens	Charra Tea	Nadine Coyle (Note: portrayed as having just auditioned for the role of Mary Poppins played by Julie Andrews)	SAFE
6	—N/a	Jon Lee; Rachel Stevens	Lill	Queen Victoria	SAFE
6	—N/a	Jon Lee; Rachel Stevens	Marmalade	Marie Antoinette	SAFE
6	—N/a	Jon Lee; Rachel Stevens	Rileasa Slaves	Rihanna	BTM
6	—N/a	Jon Lee; Rachel Stevens	Chanel O'Conor	Miss Coco Peru	ELIM
7	Snatch Me Out!	Jordan North			
7	Snatch Me Out!	Jordan North	Bonnie Ann Clyde	Cher (Note: credited as "chair")	WIN
7	Snatch Me Out!	Jordan North	Catrin Feelings	Bonnie Tyler	SAFE
7	Snatch Me Out!	Jordan North	Elle Vosque	JoJo Siwa	SAFE
7	Snatch Me Out!	Jordan North	Silllexa Diction	Zoë Wanamaker (Note: as Lady Cassandra from Doctor Who)	SAFE
7	Snatch Me Out!	Jordan North	Tayris Mongardi	Matt Lucas (Note: as Precious Little from Come Fly with Me)	SAFE
7	Snatch Me Out!	Jordan North	Bones	Liam Gallagher	BTM
7	Snatch Me Out!	Jordan North	Paige Three	Amazon Alexa	ELIM
8	Snatch Me Out!	Arian Nik			
8	Snatch Me Out!	Arian Nik	Coral-Hole Mandi	Jane Turner (Note: as Kath Day-Knight from Kath & Kim)	WIN
8	Snatch Me Out!	Arian Nik	Coral-Hole Mandi	Gina Riley (Note: as Kim Craig from Kath & Kim)	WIN
8	Snatch Me Out!	Arian Nik	Anita Piss	Bill Skarsgård (Note: as Count Orlok from Nosferatu)	SAFE
8	Snatch Me Out!	Arian Nik	Mocha	Guy Fawkes	SAFE
8	Snatch Me Out!	Arian Nik	Naya Thorn	Gretel	SAFE
8	Snatch Me Out!	Arian Nik	Paris Baby	Eve	SAFE
8	Snatch Me Out!	Duncan James	Flesh	Charlotte Tilbury	SAFE
8	Snatch Me Out!	Duncan James	KY Kelly	Jane McDonald	SAFE
8	Snatch Me Out!	Duncan James	The Delta Quadrant	Mary Todd Lincoln	SAFE
8	Snatch Me Out!	Duncan James	Alik	Rupert Everett (Note: as Camilla Fritton from St Trinian's)	BTM
8	Snatch Me Out!	Duncan James	Tequila Thirst	Helena Bonham Carter	ELIM

==== RuPaul's Drag Race: UK vs. the World ====
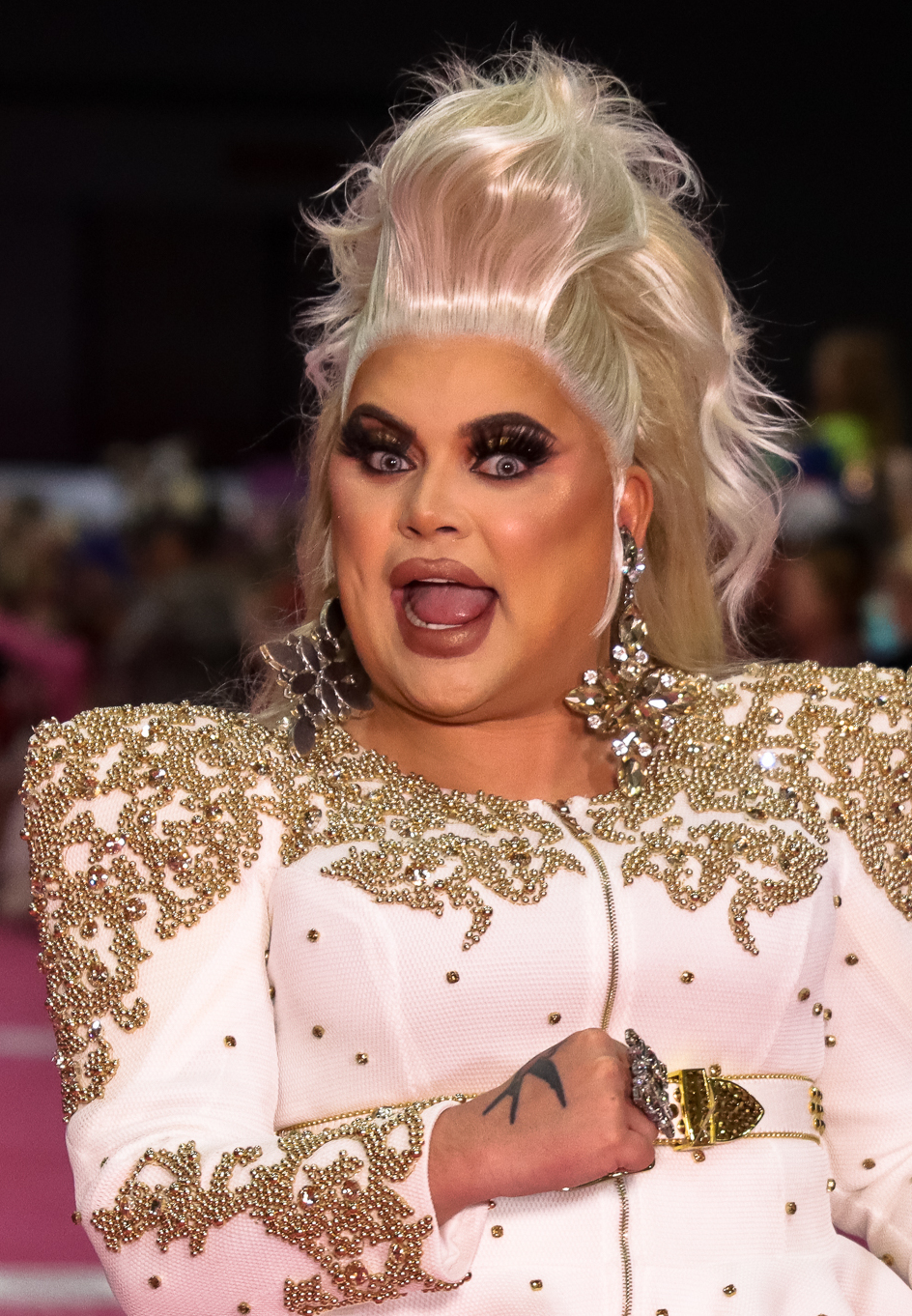
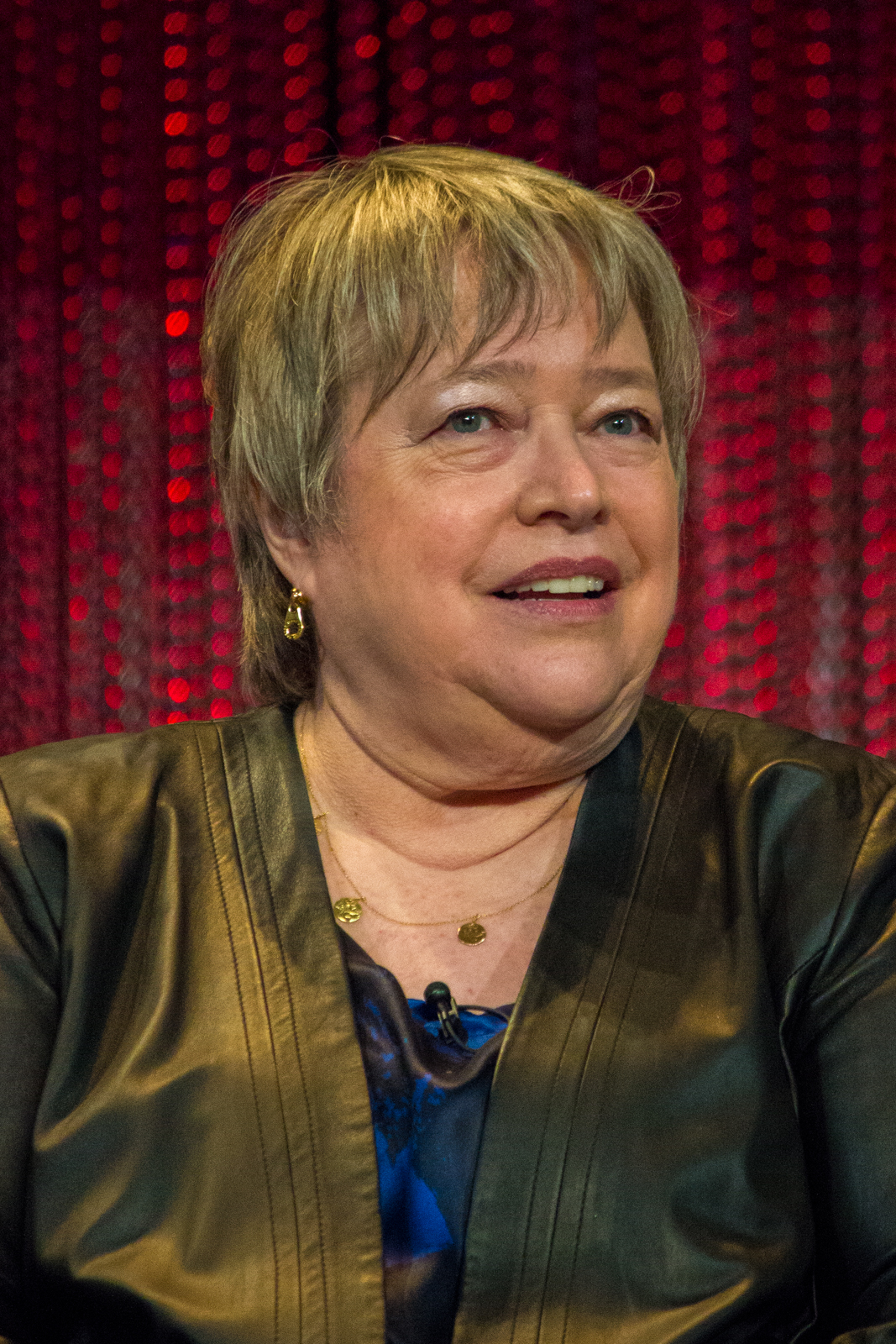
Baga Chipz (left) won on series 1 for her portrayal of Kathy Bates (right), becoming the third contestant to win the challenge twice.
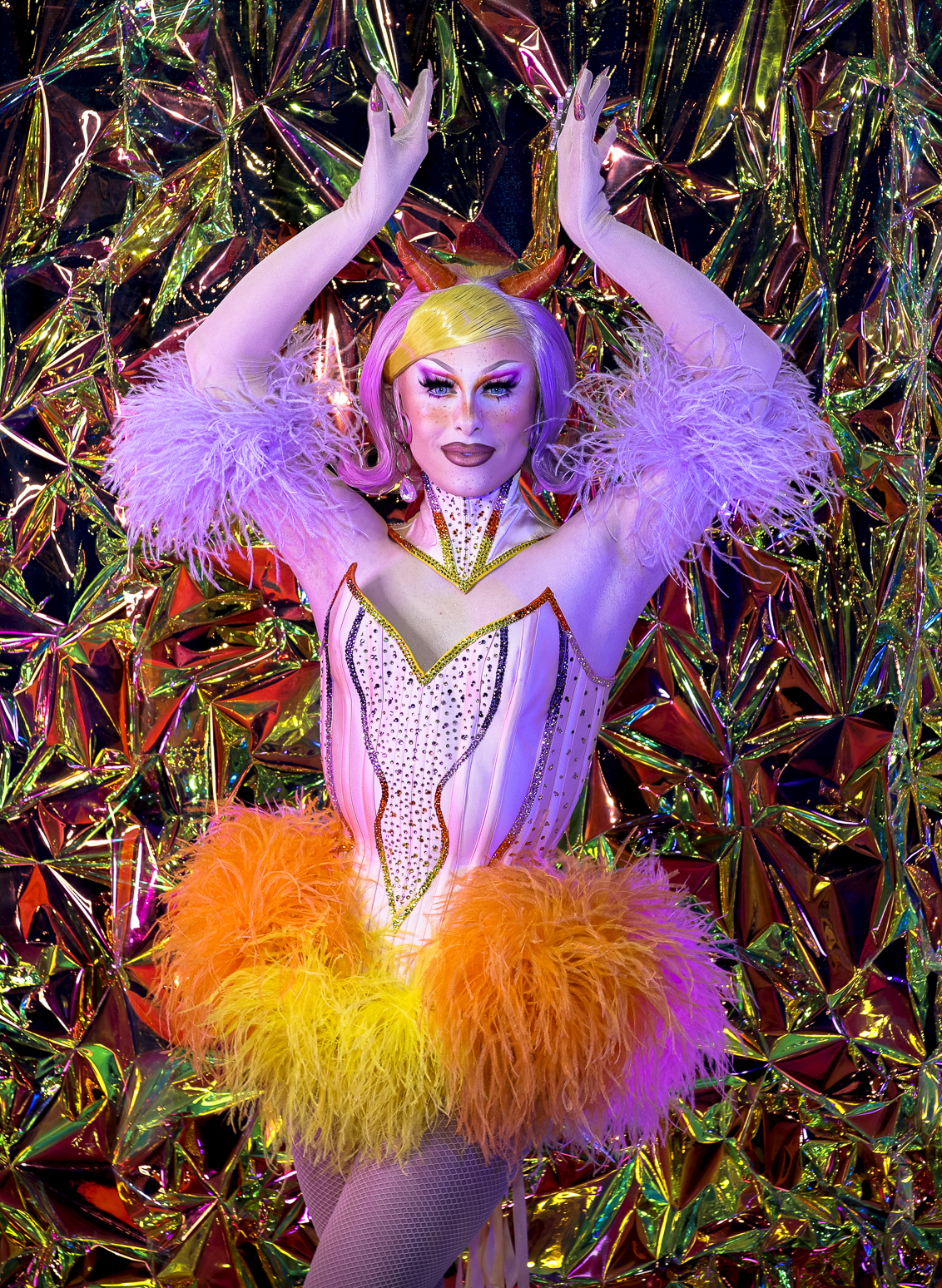
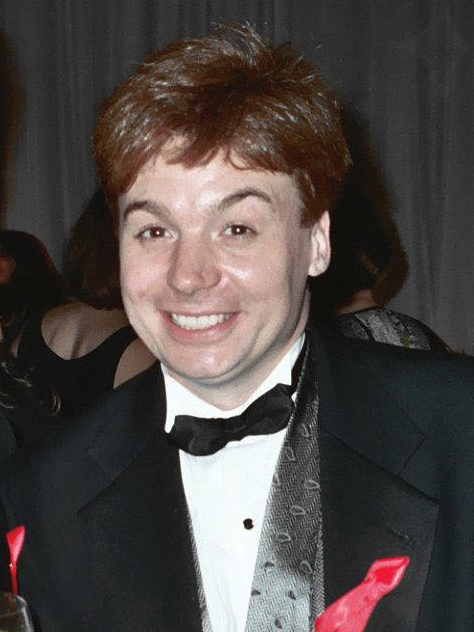
Blu Hydrangea (left) also won on series 1 for her portrayal of Mike Myers (right).
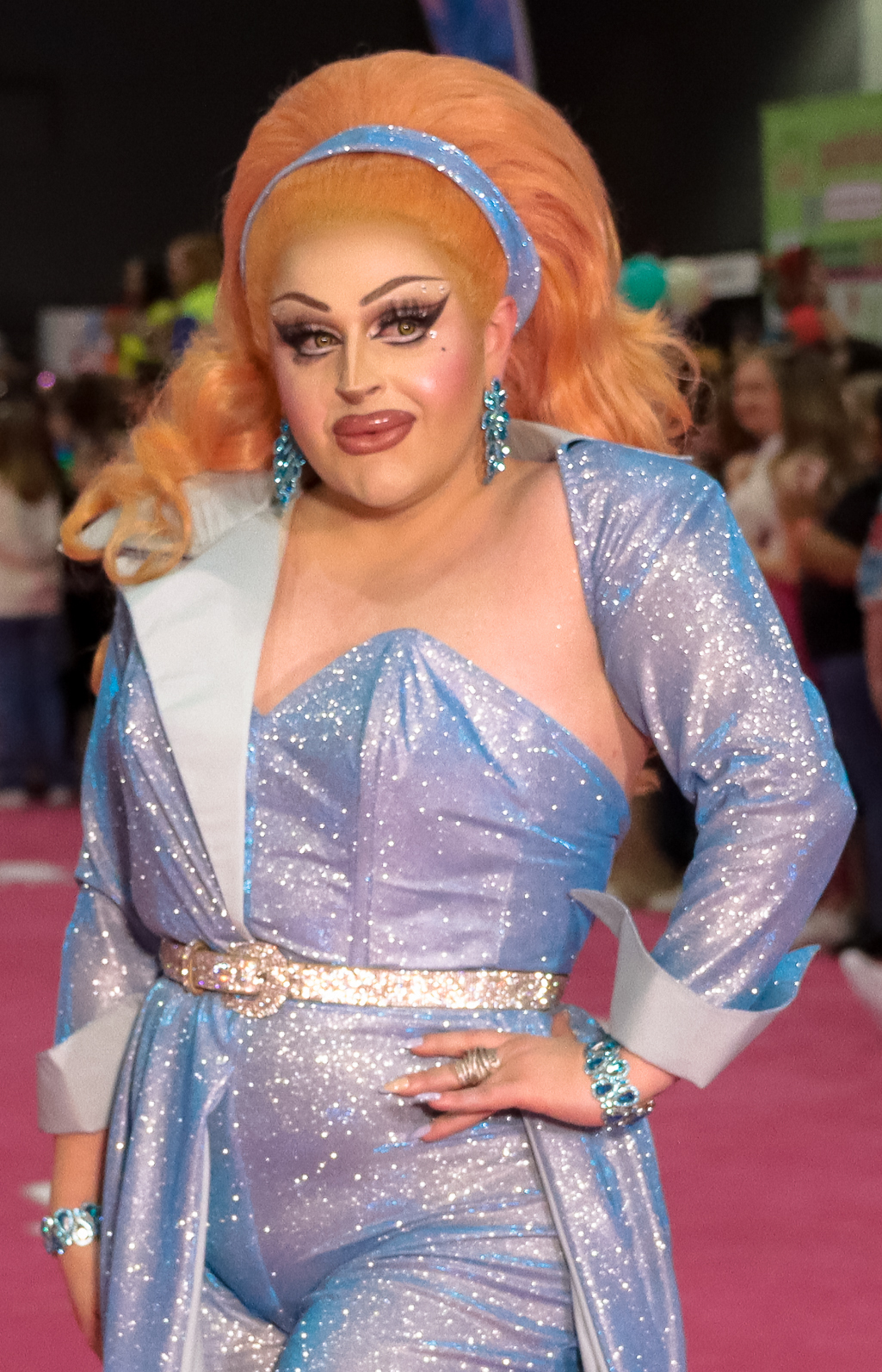
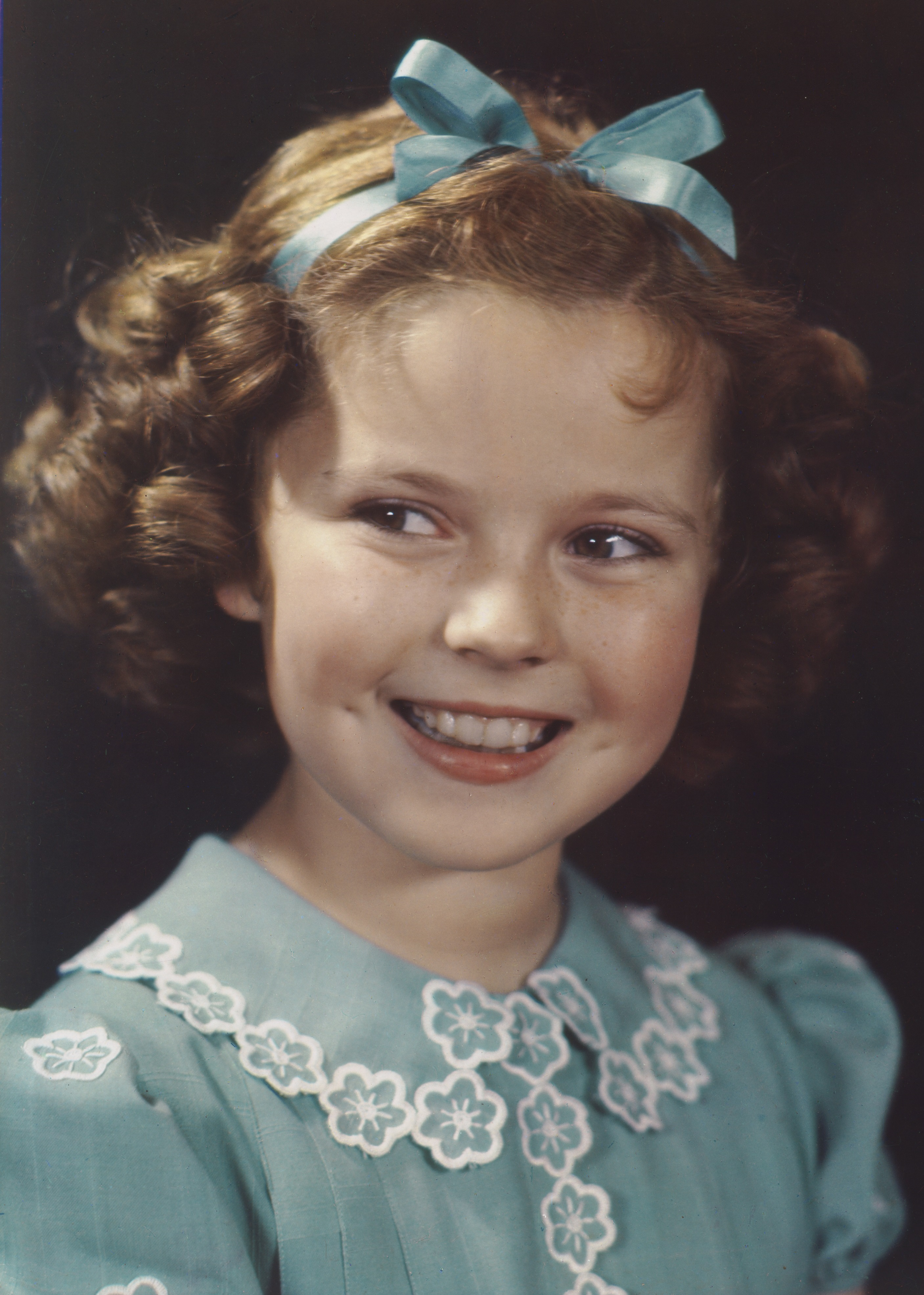
Hannah Conda (left) won on series 2 for her portrayal of Shirley Temple (right), becoming the seventh queen to win the challenge twice.
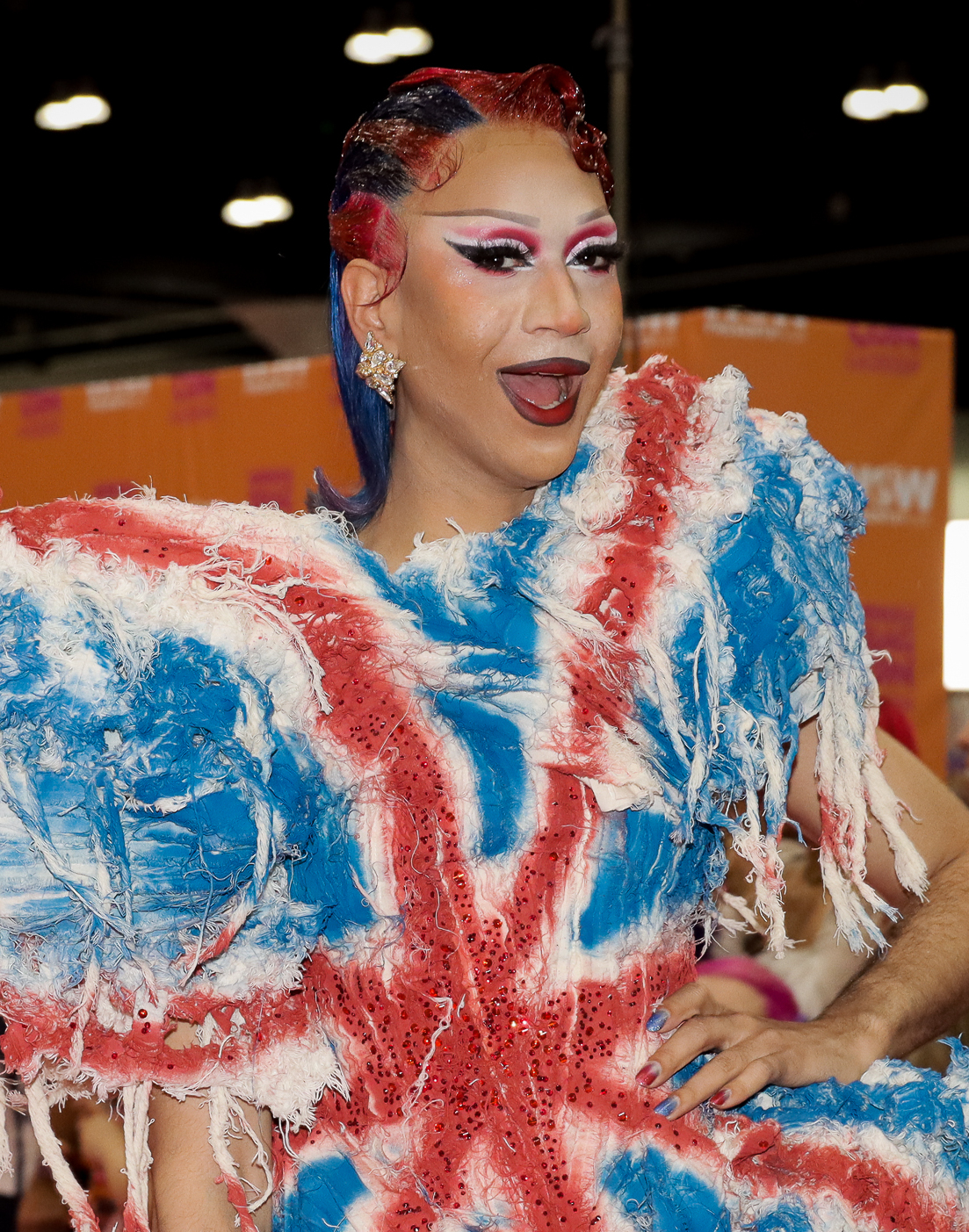
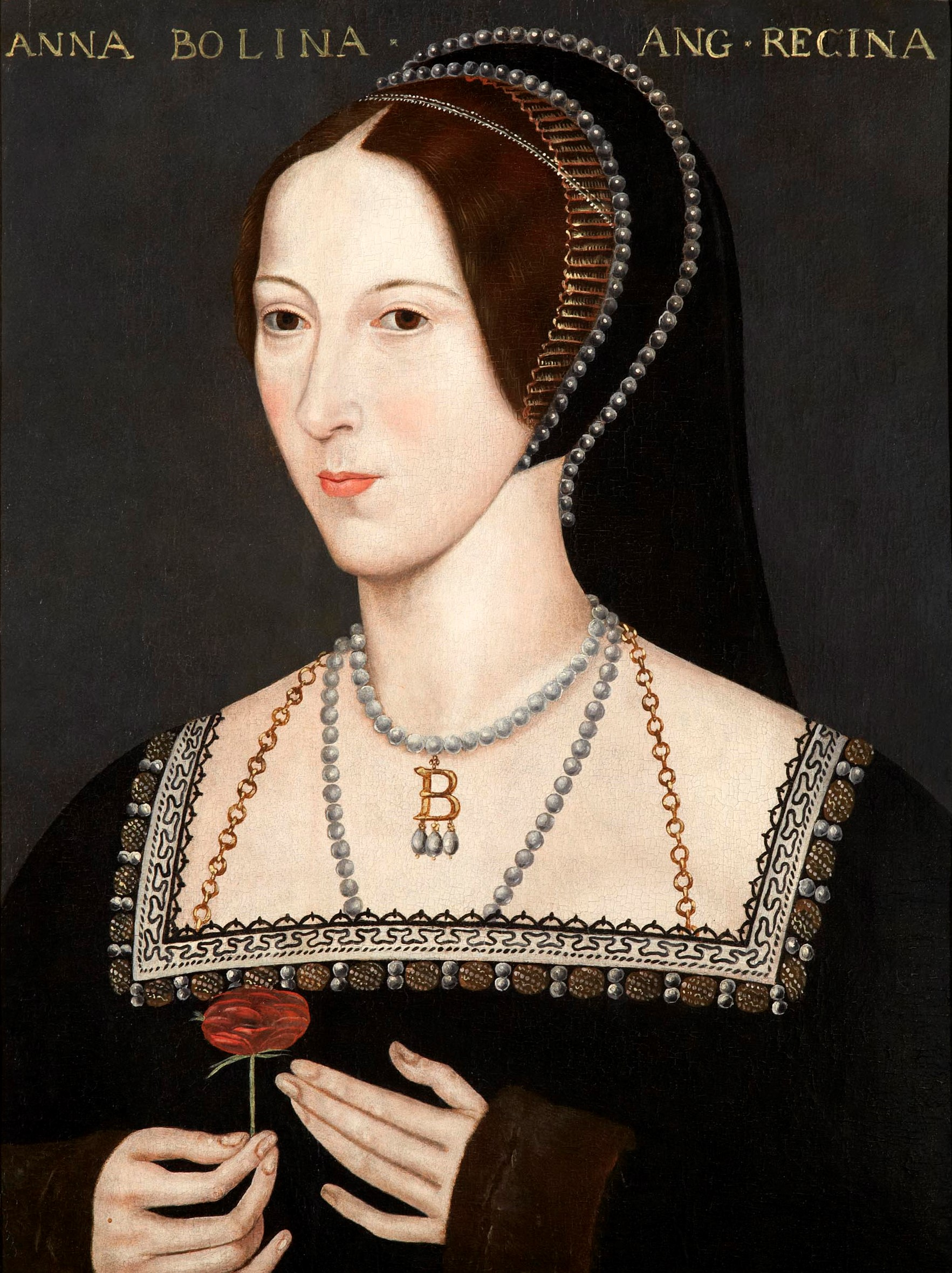
Tia Kofi (left) also won on series 2 for her portrayal of Anne Boleyn (right).

Contestants of RuPaul's Drag Race: UK vs. the World and their imitations
Series	Type	Guest celebrities	Contestant	Impersonation	Result
1	Snatch Game: Family Edition	Katie Price	Baga Chipz	Kathy Bates (Note: as Annie Wilkes from Misery)	TOP2
1	Snatch Game: Family Edition	Katie Price	Jujubee	Cher	BTM
1	Snatch Game: Family Edition	Katie Price	Pangina Heals	Mariah Carey	ELIM
1	Snatch Game: Family Edition	Michelle Visage	Blu Hydrangea	Mike Myers (Note: first as Austin Powers and then as Dr. Evil from the Austin Powers series of films)	WIN
1	Snatch Game: Family Edition	Michelle Visage	Janey Jacké	James Charles	BTM
1	Snatch Game: Family Edition	Michelle Visage	Mo Heart	Billy Porter (Note: as Pray Tell from Pose)	BTM
2	Snatch Game: Family Edition	Jane McDonald	La Grande Dame	Carla Bruni	SAFE
2	Snatch Game: Family Edition	Jane McDonald	Marina Summers	Manny Pacquiao	SAFE
2	Snatch Game: Family Edition	Jane McDonald	Gothy Kendoll	Kim Woodburn	BTM
2	Snatch Game: Family Edition	Jane McDonald	Keta Minaj	Fran Drescher	ELIM
2	Snatch Game: Family Edition	Sinitta	Tia Kofi	Anne Boleyn	WIN
2	Snatch Game: Family Edition	Sinitta	Hannah Conda	Shirley Temple	TOP2
2	Snatch Game: Family Edition	Sinitta	Choriza May	Catherine of Aragon	SAFE
2	Snatch Game: Family Edition	Sinitta	Scarlet Envy	Statue of Liberty	SAFE
3	The Miss Snatch Game Pageant	Ashley Roberts; Kimberly Wyatt			
3	The Miss Snatch Game Pageant	Ashley Roberts; Kimberly Wyatt	Gawdland	Cardi B	WIN
3	The Miss Snatch Game Pageant	Ashley Roberts; Kimberly Wyatt	Kate Butch	Humpty Dumpty	SAFE
3	The Miss Snatch Game Pageant	Ashley Roberts; Kimberly Wyatt	Mariah Balenciaga	Jackée Harry	SAFE
3	The Miss Snatch Game Pageant	Ashley Roberts; Kimberly Wyatt	The Only Naomy	Gerrharrt H. (Note: a satirical gay brother of Adolf Hitler)	SAFE
3	The Miss Snatch Game Pageant	Ashley Roberts; Kimberly Wyatt	Sminty Drop	Big Bad Wolf	SAFE
3	The Miss Snatch Game Pageant	Ashley Roberts; Kimberly Wyatt	Zahirah Zapanta	Jessica Alves	SAFE
3	The Miss Snatch Game Pageant	Ashley Roberts; Kimberly Wyatt	Serena Morena	Charo	SAVE
3	The Miss Snatch Game Pageant	Ashley Roberts; Kimberly Wyatt	Fontana	Carmen Miranda	BTM
3	The Miss Snatch Game Pageant	Ashley Roberts; Kimberly Wyatt	Minty Fresh	Unicorn	ELIM

== Celebrities impersonated multiple times ==
Cardi B and Jennifer Coolidge are the most frequently impersonated celebrities. Coolidge was the first to be simultaneously impersonated by two competing contestants in the same Snatch Game followed by Liberace. All the contestants who impersonated Mariah Carey and two of the contestants who impersonated Cardi B and Celia Cruz were eliminated, making them the only impersonations to lead to multiple eliminations. Both of the contestants to impersonate Ariana Grande, Ellen DeGeneres, Ludwig van Beethoven, Nancy Grace, and Rue McClanahan, respectively, two of the three contestants to impersonate Lady Gaga, and two of the four contestants to impersonate Celine Dion were up for elimination due to their performances, but only one contestant was eliminated for each. Two of the four contestants to impersonate Eartha Kitt, and two of the three contestants to impersonate Cher and RuPaul, respectively, landed in the bottom, but none of them were eliminated. Three of the four contestants to impersonate Liza Minnelli won the Snatch Game, making her the first impersonation subject to earn multiple contestants a win, while Joan Rivers became the second following season 15 of RuPaul's Drag Race.

Number	Celebrity	Contestant	Season
6	Cardi B	Vanda Miss Joaquim	Thailand 2
6	Cardi B	Jaida Essence Hall	Season 12
6	Cardi B	Ivy-Elyse	Holland 2
6	Cardi B	Stephanie Prince	Canada vs. the World 1
6	Cardi B	Rita Menu	Down Under 3
6	Cardi B	Gawdland	UK vs. the World 3
6	Jennifer Coolidge	Scarlet Adams	Down Under 1
6	Jennifer Coolidge	Jaymes Mansfield	All Stars 8
6	Jennifer Coolidge	DeeDee Marié Holliday	Philippines 2
6	Jennifer Coolidge	Kitten Kaboodle	Canada 4
6	Jennifer Coolidge	Nearah Nuff	Canada 4
6	Jennifer Coolidge	Bhorj Gum	Philippines 4
4	Celine Dion	Brooke Lynn Hytes	Season 11
4	Celine Dion	Chic-Li-Fay	Celebrity 2
4	Celine Dion	Lana Cotta	France 4
4	Celine Dion	Sami Landri	Canada All Stars 1
4	Charo	Shuga Cain	Season 11
4	Charo	Flor	Down Under 3
4	Charo	Serena Morena	UK vs. the World 3
4	Charo	Estrella Xtravaganza	Down Under vs. the World 1
4	Cher	Delta Work	Season 3
4	Cher	Chad Michaels	Season 4
4	Cher	Jujubee	UK vs. the World 1
4	Cher	Bonnie Ann Clyde	UK 7
4	Eartha Kitt	Chi Chi DeVayne	Season 8
4	Eartha Kitt	Valentina	All Stars 4
4	Eartha Kitt	Jujubee	All Stars 5
4	Eartha Kitt	Chakra 7	Celebrity 2
4	Jane Turner	Tayce	UK 2
4	Jane Turner	Mandy Moobs	Down Under 4
4	Jane Turner	Art Simone	Down Under vs. the World 1
4	Jane Turner	Coral-Hole Mandi	UK 8
4	La Veneno	Icesis Couture	Canada 2
4	La Veneno	Perseo	France 3
4	La Veneno	Leexa Fox	México 2
4	La Veneno	Alma DeSoul	España 6
4	Liza Minnelli	Alexis Michelle	Season 9
4	Liza Minnelli	Scarlett BoBo	Canada 1
4	Liza Minnelli	Hannah Conda	Down Under 2
4	Liza Minnelli	La Voix	UK 6
3	Adele	Ginger Minj	Season 7
3	Adele	Anita Wigl'it	Canada vs. the World 1
3	Adele	Arizona Brandy	Philippines 2
3	Beyoncé	Tyra Sanchez	Season 2
3	Beyoncé	Kenya Michaels	Season 4
3	Beyoncé	Asia O'Hara	Season 10
3	Britney Spears	Tatianna	Season 2
3	Britney Spears	Derrick Barry	Season 8
3	Britney Spears	Fontana	Sverige 1
3	Celia Cruz	Lineysha Sparx	Season 5
3	Celia Cruz	Krystal Forever	España 5
3	Celia Cruz	Xunami Muse	Latina Royale 1
3	Donatella Versace	Miss Fame	Season 7
3	Donatella Versace	Icesis Couture	Canada vs. the World 1
3	Donatella Versace	Isis Avis Loren	Down Under 3
3	Jesus Christ	Ashley Madison	Down Under 3
3	Jesus Christ	Aimee Yonce Shennel	Canada 4
3	Jesus Christ	Eva Blunt	México 2
3	JoJo Siwa	Lemon	Canada 1
3	JoJo Siwa	Elle Vosque	UK 7
3	JoJo Siwa	Juicy Love Dion	Season 18
3	Julia Child	Milk	Season 6
3	Julia Child	Divina de Campo	UK 1
3	Julia Child	Vybe	Down Under 4
3	Katy Perry	Alyssa Edwards	Season 5
3	Katy Perry	Perseo	France 3
3	Katy Perry	Jenary Bloom	México 2
3	Lady Gaga	Sonique	Season 2
3	Lady Gaga	Phi Phi O'Hara	Season 4
3	Lady Gaga	Miz Cracker	All Stars 5
3	Lizzo	Coco Jumbo	Down Under 1
3	Lizzo	Silky Nutmeg Ganache	Canada vs. the World 1
3	Lizzo	Kenya Pleaser	Season 18
3	Mariah Carey	Kiara	Canada 1
3	Mariah Carey	Pangina Heals	UK vs. the World 1
3	Mariah Carey	Holly White	France 4
3	Marilyn Monroe	Ivy Winters	Season 5
3	Marilyn Monroe	Irma Gerd	Canada 3
3	Marilyn Monroe	Benze Diva	Thailand 3
3	RuPaul	Jessica Wild	Season 2
3	RuPaul	Trixie Mattel	All Stars 3
3	RuPaul	Diamante Merybrown	España 2
3	Whitney Houston	Sahara Davenport	Season 2
3	Whitney Houston	Monét X Change	All Stars 4
3	Whitney Houston	Trinity K. Bonet	All Stars 6
2	Alyssa Edwards	Violet Chachki	Season 7
2	Alyssa Edwards	Aja	Season 9
2	Amanda Lear	Punani	France 2
2	Amanda Lear	Lina Galore	Italia 3
2	Amanda Lepore	Trinity Taylor	Season 9
2	Amanda Lepore	Luxx Noir London	Season 15
2	Amy Winehouse	Yara Sofia	Season 3
2	Amy Winehouse	Petchra	Thailand 1
2	Anna Delvey	Morphine Love Dion	Season 16
2	Anna Delvey	Yuhua	Slaysian Royale 1
2	Ariana Grande	Tatianna	All Stars 2
2	Ariana Grande	Kimmy Couture	Canada 3
2	Bette Midler	VYBE	Down Under vs. the World 1
2	Bette Midler	Vanessa Artiles	España 6
2	Big Ang	Pearl	Season 7
2	Big Ang	Kori King	Season 17
2	Bretman Rock	Aura Mayari	Season 15
2	Bretman Rock	Tiffany Ann Co.	Canada All Stars 1
2	Carol Channing	Pandora Boxx	Season 2
2	Carol Channing	Bob the Drag Queen	Season 8
2	Catherine Tate	The Vivienne	All Stars 7
2	Catherine Tate	Michael Marouli	UK 5
2	Sir David Attenborough	Sum Ting Wing	UK 1
2	Sir David Attenborough	Nini Coco	Season 18
2	Diana Vreeland	Robbie Turner	Season 8
2	Diana Vreeland	Raja	All Stars 7
2	Dolly Parton	Karen from Finance	Down Under 1
2	Dolly Parton	Kylie Sonique Love	All Stars 6
2	Drew Barrymore	Willow Pill	Season 14
2	Drew Barrymore	Myki Meeks	Season 18
2	Eddie Murphy	Karna Ford	Down Under 4
2	Eddie Murphy	Onya Nurve	Season 17
2	Ellen DeGeneres	Blair St. Clair	All Stars 5
2	Ellen DeGeneres	Minnie Cooper	Down Under 2
2	Flavor Flav	Shea Couleé	All Stars 5
2	Flavor Flav	Karamilk	Canada 6
2	Fran Drescher	Courtney Act	Season 6
2	Fran Drescher	Keta Minaj	UK vs. the World 2
2	Gemma Collins	Cheryl Hole	UK 1
2	Gemma Collins	Kitty Scott-Claus	UK 3
2	Gina Riley	Brenda Bressed	Down Under 4
2	Gina Riley	Coral-Hole Mandi	UK 8
2	Grace Jones	BeBe Zahara Benet	All Stars 3
2	Grace Jones	Love Masisi	Holland 2
2	Inês Brasil	Shannon Skarlett	Brasil 1
2	Inês Brasil	Victoria Shakespears	Germany 1
2	Joan Crawford	Mariah	Season 3
2	Joan Crawford	Alyssa Edwards	All Stars 2
2	Joan Rivers	Jimbo	Canada 1
2	Joan Rivers	Loosey LaDuca	Season 15
2	Joe Exotic	ChelseaBoy	Holland 1
2	Joe Exotic	Venus	Canada 4
2	José José	Luna Lansman	México 2
2	José José	Regina Voce	Latina Royale 1
2	Kim Woodburn	Victoria Scone	Canada vs. the World 1
2	Kim Woodburn	Gothy Kendoll	UK vs. the World 2
2	Leslie Jones	Heidi N Closet	Season 12
2	Leslie Jones	Kimora Amour	Canada 2
2	Liberace	Nina West	All Stars 9
2	Liberace	Shannel	All Stars 9
2	Louis XIV	The Countess	Holland 2
2	Louis XIV	Punani	France All Stars 1
2	Ludwig van Beethoven	Loreley Rivers	Germany 1
2	Ludwig van Beethoven	Marcus Massalami	España 6
2	Manny Pacquiao	Melinda Verga	Canada 4
2	Manny Pacquiao	Marina Summers	UK vs. the World 2
2	Maria Sofia Love	Minty Fresh	Philippines 1
2	Maria Sofia Love	Valeria	Philippines 4
2	Matt Lucas	Ellie Diamond	UK 2
2	Matt Lucas	Tayris Mongardi	UK 7
2	Maya Angelou	Chi Chi DeVayne	All Stars 3
2	Maya Angelou	Monét X Change	Season 10
2	Mrs. Claus	Freya Armani	Down Under 4
2	Mrs. Claus	Darlene Mitchell	Season 18
2	Mona Lisa	Hugáceo Crujiente	España 1
2	Mona Lisa	Jax	Season 15
2	Nancy Grace	Acid Betty	Season 8
2	Nancy Grace	Detox	All Stars 2
2	Naomi Campbell	Shea Couleé	Season 9
2	Naomi Campbell	Hollywould Star	Down Under 3
2	NeNe Leakes	Peppermint	Season 9
2	NeNe Leakes	Kween Kong	Down Under 2
2	Nicki Minaj	Trinity K. Bonet	Season 6
2	Nicki Minaj	JAJA	Thailand 1
2	Paris Hilton	Raven	Season 2
2	Paris Hilton	Gottmik	Season 13
2	Paulina Rubio	Visa	España 3
2	Paulina Rubio	Ava Pocket	México 2
2	Pete Burns	Dakota Schiffer	UK 4
2	Pete Burns	Lydia B Kollins	All Stars 10
2	Rachel Zoe	Laganja Estranja	Season 6
2	Rachel Zoe	Synthia Kiss	Canada 2
2	Rihanna	Rileasa Slaves	UK 6
2	Rihanna	Gigi Ferocious	Thailand 3
2	Rue McClanahan	Crystal	UK 1
2	Rue McClanahan	Elliott with 2 Ts	Season 13
2	Rufa Mae Quinto	Eva Le Queen	Philippines 1
2	Rufa Mae Quinto	Myx Chanel	Philippines 3
2	Saucy Santana	Jada Shada Hudson	Canada 3
2	Saucy Santana	Malaysia Babydoll Foxx	Season 15
2	Shirley Temple	Jimbo	All Stars 8
2	Shirley Temple	Hannah Conda	UK vs. the World 2
2	Sofía Vergara	Cynthia Lee Fontaine	Season 9
2	Sofía Vergara	Adriana	Canada 2
2	Tabitha Brown	Olivia Lux	Season 13
2	Tabitha Brown	Kennedy Davenport	Canada vs. the World 2
2	Tammy Faye Messner	Ginger Minj	All Stars 2
2	Tammy Faye Messner	Vivian Vanderpuss	Canada 3
2	Theresa Caputo	Phi Phi O'Hara	All Stars 2
2	Theresa Caputo	Mya Foxx	Canada 6
2	Tiffany Haddish	Monique Heart	All Stars 4
2	Tiffany Haddish	A'keria C. Davenport	Season 11
2	Tina Turner	Shangela	Season 3
2	Tina Turner	Widow Von'Du	Season 12
2	Trisha Paytas	Sugar	Season 15
2	Trisha Paytas	Acacia Forgot	Season 17
2	Ts Madison	Silky Nutmeg Ganache	Season 11
2	Ts Madison	Jada Shada Hudson	Canada All Stars 1
2	Queen Victoria	Cheryl	Canada vs. the World 2
2	Queen Victoria	Lill	UK 6
2	Walter Mercado	Alexis Mateo	All Stars 5
2	Walter Mercado	Regina Voce	México 1
2	Wendy Williams	DiDa Ritz	Season 4
2	Wendy Williams	Naomi Smalls	All Stars 4

== Reception ==
Snatch Game is considered the signature challenge on the show. Kevin O'Keeffe from Into discusses that the challenge isn't only about the celebrity impersonation and RuPaul looks for accuracy, humor, and the idea of the character. He also states that the challenge tests a lot of different skills, such as the queens' ability to put on a different look from their signature one, and also their ability to be "funny on a dime". RuPaul states each year, as the challenge is introduced, that the cardinal rule of the challenge is to make him laugh.

Writing for Vulture, Bowen Yang and Matt Rogers state that "Snatch Game" is "the mother of all comedy challenges on a reality show" despite the varied results over the years. On a more critical reception of the challenge, Josh Lee, for PopBuzz, argues that while the annual challenge has given viewers some of the best moments from RuPaul's Drag Race, it is starting to feel stale overall. He comments that recent celebrity impersonations in the challenge have been lackluster and the show should adapt and retire "Snatch Game" in future seasons of the series.
