= Bandit (drag queen) =

Thai drag performer and costume designer (1985–2023)

- บัณฑิต จันทะวัน
- Born: Bandit Janthawan; 10 July 1985
- Died: 26 December 2023 (aged 38); Thailand
- Other names: Tum
- Television: Drag Race Thailand (season 2)

Bandit Janthawan (Thai: บัณฑิต จันทะวัน, pronounced [bān.dìt tɕān tʰa.wān]; 10 July 1985 – 26 December 2023), known by the stage name of Bandit, was a Thai drag performer, costume designer, and personal stylist who competed on season 2 of Drag Race Thailand. Bandit created outfits worn by Pangina Heals on the show.

== Career ==
Bandit Janthawan competed as Bandit on the second season of Drag Race Thailand, which aired in 2019. She won the fifth episode's acting challenge, alongside Vanda Miss Joaquim, Angele Anang, Genie, Miss Gimhuay, and Mocha Diva. Bandit and Vanda Miss Joaquim were eliminated on episode 11, placing 4th/5th overall.

As a fashion designer, Bandit released the collection The Men from the Venus in 2011. In addition to designing and sewing, Bandit was able to spin, knit, and process fabric for garments. Bandit was an adjunct lecturer of fashion design at multiple universities, and ran the fashion line Bandit by Bandit.

== Personal life and death ==
Janthawan was born on 10 July 1985, and died in Thailand in December 2023, at the age of 38.

Following the announcement of Bandit's death, Drag Race Thailand judge Pangina Heals and contestants paid tribute on social media, including Angele Anang and Kana Warrior. World of Wonder, the American production company behind Drag Race, also paid tribute to Bandit.

== Filmography ==
=== Television ===
List of television credits
| Year | Title | Role | Notes | Ref. |
|---|---|---|---|---|
| 2019 | Drag Race Thailand (season 2) | Herself/Contestant | 4th/5th place | |
