= Drag Race Thailand season 1 =

Drag Race Thailand
- Season 1
- Promotional poster for season one
- Judges: Art Arya; Pangina Heals
- No. of contestants: 10
- Winner: Natalia Pliacam
- Runners-up: Année Maywong; Dearis Doll
- Miss Congeniality: B Ella
- No. of episodes: 8

Release
- Original network: Kantana Group
- Original release: 15 February – 5 April 2018

Season chronology
- Next → Season 2

Drag Race Thailand is a Thai reality competition television series based on the American reality competition series RuPaul's Drag Race. Art Arya and Pangina Heals are the judges of the show. The first season premiered on 15 February 2018 and ended on 5 April 2018.

The winner of this season was Natalia Pliacam, and Année Maywong and Dearis Doll were the runners-up. B Ella was voted Miss Congeniality.

== Contestants ==
(Ages, names, and cities stated are at time of filming.)

Contestants of Drag Race Thailand season 1 and their backgrounds
| Contestant | Age | Hometown | Outcome |
|---|---|---|---|
| Natalia Pliacam | 37 | Bangkok | Winner |
| Année Maywong | 30 | Bangkok | Runners-up |
| Dearis Doll | 30 | Nakhon Pathom | Runners-up |
| B Ella | 30 | Nakhon Ratchasima | 4th place (Note: B Ella was voted Miss Congeniality by the fans.) |
| Amadiva | 24 | Bangkok | 5th place |
| JAJA | 34 | Imus, Philippines | 5th place |
| Petchra | 30 | Rayong | 7th place |
| Morrigan (Note: Morrigan Xaster is referred to as Morrigan on the show.) | 18 | Bangkok | 8th place |
| Bunny Be Fly | 25 | Nakhon Ratchasima | 9th place |
| Meannie Minaj | 26 | Phrae | 10th place |

== Contestant progress ==
Legend:

Natalia Pliacam won Drag Race Thailand season 1.
Année Maywong and Dearis Doll were the runners-up.
B Ella was voted Miss Congeniality (Miss C) by fellow contestants.
WIN indicates that the contestant won both the maxi and runway challenges.
TOP indicates that the contestant won the maxi challenge.
RW (Runway win) indicates that the contestant won the runway challenge.
SAFE indicates that the contestant was declared safe by the judges.
BTM (Bottom) indicates that the contestant was up for elimination.
WBT (Winner in the bottom) indicates that although the contestant won the maxi challenge, they were the worst in the runway challenge and were subsequently put up for elimination.
ELIM (Eliminated) indicates that the contestant was eliminated.
Guest indicates that the contestant returned as a guest.

Contestants progress with placements in each episode
| Contestant | Episode | | | | | | | |
| Contestant | 1 | 2 | 3 | 4 | 5 | 6 | 7 | 8 |
|---|---|---|---|---|---|---|---|---|
| Natalia Pliacam | SAFE | TOP | SAFE | WBM | WIN | SAFE | SAFE | Winner |
| Année Maywong | TOP | SAFE | TOP | SAFE | BTM | SAFE | WIN | Runner-up |
| Dearis Doll | SAFE | SAFE | BTM | RW | SAFE | WIN | BTM | Runner-up |
| B Ella | SAFE | SAFE | SAFE | SAFE | SAFE | TOP | ELIM | Miss C |
| Amadiva | SAFE | RW | SAFE | BTM | SAFE | ELIM | Guest | Guest |
| JAJA | SAFE | SAFE | SAFE | RW | BTM | ELIM | Guest | Guest |
| Petchra | SAFE | BTM | SAFE | SAFE | ELIM | | Guest | Guest |
| Morrigan | BTM | SAFE | ELIM | | | | Guest | Guest |
| Bunny Be Fly | SAFE | ELIM | | | | | Guest | Guest |
| Meannie Minaj | ELIM | | | | | | Guest | Guest |

== Lip syncs ==
| Episode | Contestants | | | Song | Eliminated |
|---|---|---|---|---|---|
| 1 | Meannie Minaj | vs. | Morrigan | "Born This Way" (Lady Gaga) | Meannie Minaj |
| 2 | Bunny Be Fly | vs. | Petchra | "รักยังไม่ต้องการ (I Don't Want Love Yet)" (Marsha Vadhanapanich) | Bunny Be Fly |
| 3 | Dearis Doll | vs. | Morrigan | "O.K.นะคะ (O.K. Yes)" (Katreeya English) | Morrigan |
| 4 | Amadiva | vs. | Natalia Pliacam | "Dhoom Dhoom" (Tata Young) | None |
| 5 | Année Maywong vs. JAJA vs. Petchra | | | "Toxic" (Britney Spears) | Petchra |
| 6 | Amadiva | vs. | JAJA | "เพลงสุดท้าย (Last Song)" (Suda Chuenban) | Amadiva |
| 6 | Amadiva | vs. | JAJA | "เพลงสุดท้าย (Last Song)" (Suda Chuenban) | JAJA |
| 7 | B Ella | vs. | Dearis Doll | "Crazy in Love" (Beyoncé ft. Jay-Z) | B Ella |

The contestant was eliminated after their first time in the bottom.
The contestant was eliminated after their second time in the bottom.

== Guest judges ==
- Madame Mod, Thai drag queen
- Madeaw, stylist
- Pa-Tue, fashion designer
- Marsha Vadhanapanich, actress, model and singer
- Jai Sira, Thai drag queen
- Mae Baan Mee Nuad, Thai drag queen
- Prapakas Angsulin, fashion designer
- Cris Horwang, actress and model
- Ananda Everingham, actor
- Sinjai Plengpanich, actress, model and singer
- Pattriya Na Nakorn, author, socialite and Director at Gucci
- Metinee Kingpayom, actress, model, producer and Miss Thailand World 1992
- Polpat Asavaprapha, fashion designer
- Araya A. Hargate, actress, model and TV host
- Ornapa Krisadee, actress
- Pavarisa Chumvigrant, VP of Marketing "Line Mobile", DTAC TriNet Co., Ltd.
- Chom, Thai drag queen
- Ploy Chermarn, actress and model
- Utt Uttsada, actor and model

=== Special guests ===
Guests who appeared in episodes, but did not judge on the main stage.

Episode 4

- Ajirapha "Sabina" Meisinger, actress and model
- Natthaya "Grace" Boonchompaisarn, model
- RuPaul, American drag queen and RuPaul's Drag Race host

Episode 7

- DJ Matoom, DJ
- Teerasak Promngoen, actor

Episode 7

- Amadiva, contestant on season one
- Dearis Doll, contestant on season one
- JAJA, contestant on season one
- Meannie Minaj, contestant on season one
- Morrigan, contestant on season one
- Petchra, contestant on season one

== Episodes ==
| No. overall | No. in season | Title | Original release date |
|---|---|---|---|
| 1 | 1 | "Contestant's Story" | 15 February 2018 |
Ten new drag queens enter the workroom. For the first mini-challenge, the queens will do a photoshoot while being doused with buckets of water. Morrigan wins the mini-challenge. For the main challenge, the queens will design a three-in-one runway look which incorporates specific materials that tell a story about the contestant's life. On the runway, Année Maywong wins the challenge. Meannie Minaj and Morrigan are announced as the bottom two. They lip-sync to "Born This Way" by Lady Gaga. Morrigan wins the lip-sync and Meannie Minaj is the first queen to sashay away.: Guest Judges: Madame Mod, Madeaw and Pa-Tue; Mini-Challenge: Photoshoot while being doused with buckets of water; Mini-Challenge Winner: Morrigan; Main Challenge: Design a three-in-one runway look which incorporates specific materials that tell a story about the contestant's life; Challenge Winner: Année Maywong; Main Challenge Prize: 50,000฿ gift voucher from Apex Medical Center; Bottom Two: Meannie Minaj and Morrigan; Lip-Sync Song: "Born This Way" by Lady Gaga; Eliminated: Meannie Minaj; Farewell Message: "ขอบคุณทุกคนมาก ๆ นะ วันนี้อาจจะยังไม่วันของเรา สู้ๆนะคะ Meannie Minaj" (Thank you so much, everyone. Today probably isn't my day. Keep fighting. Meannie Minaj)
| 2 | 2 | "The Power of Love" | 22 February 2018 |
For this week's mini-challenge, the queens will do a photoshoot with blacklight. Natalia Pliacam wins the mini-challenge. For the main challenge, the queens will dress up as the bride and groom in a photoshoot. On the runway, category is Power of Love. Amadiva, Année Maywong and Natalia Pliacam receive positive critiques. Natalia Pliacam wins the main challenge. Amadiva wins the runway challenge. B Ella, Bunny Be Fly, and Petchra receive negative critiques, with B Ella being safe. Bunny Be Fly and Petchra lip-sync to "รักยังไม่ต้องการ" (I Don't Want Love Yet) by Marsha Vadhanapanich. Petchra wins the lip-sync and Bunny Be Fly sashays away.: Guest Judges: Marsha Vadhanapanich and Jai Sira; Mini-Challenge: Photoshoot with blacklight; Mini-Challenge Winner: Natalia Pliacam; Mini-Challenge Prize: 30 minutes for the maxi-challenge instead of 15; Main Challenge: Dress up as the bride and groom in a photo shoot; Main Challenge Winner: Natalia Pliacam; Main Challenge Prize: Custom pair of men's and women's shoes from Tango worth 30,000฿; Runway Theme: Power of Love; Runway Winner: Amadiva; 'Runway Prize: 50,000฿ gift voucher from Kharities Medical Aesthetic Clinic; Bottom Two: Bunny Be Fly and Petchra; Lip-Sync Song: "รักยังไม่ต้องการ" (I Don't Want Love Yet) by Marsha Vadhanapanich; Eliminated: Bunny Be Fly; Farewell Message: "ฉันยังไม่ตาย สู้ๆ นะจ๊ะ แล้วเจอกันที่สุดขอบโลก ขอบคุณสำหรับความรัก" (I'm still alive. Keep fighting. See you at the end of the world. Thank you for your love)
| 3 | 3 | "Curtain to Couture" | 1 March 2018 |
For this week's mini-challenge, the queens will do a fairy tale puppet show. Dearis Doll wins the mini-challenge. For the main challenge, the queens will design a couture evening gown made from window curtains. On the runway, Amadiva, Année Maywong, JAJA and Natalia Pliacam receive positive critiques, with Année Maywong winning the challenge. B Ella, Dearis Doll and Morrigan receive negative critiques, with B Ella being safe. Dearis Doll and Morrigan lip-sync to "O.K.นะคะ" (Okay Yes) by Katreeya English. Dearis Doll wins the lip-sync and Morrigan sashays away.: Guest Judges: Mae Baan Mee Nuad, Prapakas and Cris Horwang; Mini-Challenge: Fairy tale puppet show; Mini-Challenge Winner: Dearis Doll; Main Challenge: Create a couture evening gown out of window curtains; Challenge Winner: Année Maywong; Main Challenge Prize: 20,000฿ gift voucher from KarmaKamet; Bottom Two: Dearis Doll and Morrigan; Lip-Sync Song: "O.K.นะคะ" (Okay Yes) by Katreeya English; Eliminated: Morrigan; Farewell Message: "หนูขอบคุณมากนะที่สอนหนู รักมากนะ ♡ บายพี่จ้า จุ๊บๆ" (Thanks for teaching me. Love you so much.♡ Bye you all. XX)
| 4 | 4 | "Drag Race Thailand Debut Season Award" | 8 March 2018 |
For this week's mini-challenge, the queens will do a pink carpet photoshoot. JAJA wins the mini-challenge. For the main challenge, the queens will present and accept "Drag Race Thailand Debut Season Awards". On the runway, category is Beloved Thai Movies. B Ella, Dearis Doll, JAJA, Natalia Pliacam and Petchra receive positive critiques. Natalia Pliacam wins the main challenge. Dearis Doll and JAJA both win the runway challenge. Amadiva and Année Maywong receive negative critiques, with Année Maywong being safe. It is then announced that even though for winning the main challenge, Natalia Pliacam will be in the bottom two because of her runway, besides Amadiva. Amadiva and Natalia Pliacam lip-sync to "Dhoom Dhoom" by Tata Young. They both win the lip sync and no one is eliminated.: Guest Judges: Ananda Everingham, Sinjai Plengpanich and Pattriya Na Nakorn; Mini-Challenge: Pink carpet photoshoot; Mini-Challenge Winner: JAJA; Main Challenge: Present and accept "Drag Race Thailand Debut Season Awards"; Main Challenge Winner: Natalia Pliacam; Main Challenge Prize: One-year supply of Biore products; Runway Theme: Beloved Thai movies; Runway Winner: Dearis Doll and JAJA; Runway Prize: One-year supply of Vampye eyelashes; Bottom Two: Amadiva and Natalia Pliacam; Lip-Sync Song: "Dhoom Dhoom" by Tata Young; Eliminated: None
| 5 | 5 | "Snatch Game" | 15 March 2018 |
For this week's mini-challenge, the queens will read each other to filth. Amadiva wins the mini-challenge. For the main challenge, the queens will play the Snatch Game. Metinee Kingpayom and Polpat Asavaprapha star as the celebrity contestants. The characters are as follows: Amadiva as Cherprang Areekul; Annee Maywong as Lukkade Metinee; B Ella as Leena Jung; JAJA as Nicki Minaj; Natalia Pliacam as Sumanee Gunakasem; Petchra as Amy Winehouse; On the runway, category is Thai Silk Extravaganza. B Ella and Natalia Pliacam receive positive critiques. Natalia Pliacam wins both the main challenge and the runway challenge. Amadiva, Année Maywong, JAJA and Petchra receive negative critiques, with Amadiva being safe. Année Maywong, JAJA and Petchra lip-sync to "Toxic" by Britney Spears. Année Maywong and JAJA win the lip-sync and Petchra sashays away.: Guest Judges: Metinee Kingpayom and Polpat Asavaprapha; Mini-Challenge: Reading is Fundamental; Mini-Challenge Winner: Amadiva; Main Challenge: Snatch Game; Main Challenge Winner: Natalia Pliacam; Runway Theme: Thai Silk Extravaganza; Runway Winner: Natalia Pliacam; Main Challenge and Runway Prize: A 3 day stay at the AVANI Garden Room in Pattaya, worth 20,000฿; Bottom Three: Année Maywong, JAJA and Petchra; Lip-Sync Song: "Toxic" by Britney Spears; Eliminated: Petchra; Farewell Message: "พี่นาตาเลีย, แอนเน่, บีเอลล่า, เดียร์ริสดอล (คิดถึงทุกคนนะ) See you, Petchra" (Natalia, Année, B Ella, Dearis Doll (Miss you guys) See you, Petchra)
| 6 | 6 | "Commercial, Commercial" | 22 March 2018 |
For this week's mini-challenge, the queens will do a Line Mobile presentation clip. B Ella wins the mini-challenge. For the main challenge, the queens will pair up to create parodies of Line Mobile commercials.: Easy Love, Low Cost - Année Maywong and Natalia Pliacam; Easy Love, No Wait Time - Amadiva and JAJA; Easy Love, No Attachment - B Ella and Dearis Doll; On the runway, category is Chompoo Araya. Année Maywong, B Ella, Dearis Doll and Natalia Pliacam receive positive critiques. B Ella and Dearis Doll win the main challenge. Dearis Doll also wins the runway challenge. Amadiva and JAJA receive negative critiques, and are announced as the bottom two. They lip-sync to "เพลงสุดท้าย" (Last Song) by Suda Chuenban. After the lip-sync, Art decides to eliminate both Amadiva and JAJA from the competition, and they sashay away.: Guest Judges: Araya A. Hargate, Ornapa Krisadee and Pavarisa Chumvigrant; Mini-Challenge: Line Mobile presentation clip; Mini-Challenge Winner: B Ella; Mini-Challenge Prize: Free for use of "Line Mobile by DTAC" for 2-years with unlimited package, and privileges for select the partners of main challenge.; Main Challenge: In pairs, create parodies of Line Mobile commercials; Main Challenge Winner: B Ella and Dearis Doll; Main Challenge Prize: Free for use of "Line Mobile by DTAC" for 3-years with unlimited package for winners, and free 1 year for other competitors and presenters.; Runway Theme: Chompoo Araya; Runway Winner: Dearis Doll; Runway Prize: Gift Voucher of Tichin Nintha Krungthep, worth 20,000฿; Bottom Two: Amadiva and JAJA; Lip-Sync Song: "เพลงสุดท้าย" ("Last Song") by Suda Chuenban; Eliminated: Amadiva and JAJA; Amadiva's Farewell Message: "พวกพี่คือยอดมนุษย์ ♡ รักมากนะคะ, Amadiva" (You're Heroes. Love you so much ♡, Amadiva); JAJA's Farewell Message: "DRTH keep showing the world! Khob Khun Krub! Susu na Kha! Gicci Gicci yaya JAJA!" (Khob Khun Krub! Susu na Kha! is a Thai reading word "ขอบคุณครับ! สู้ๆ นะคะ" to transliterated in English, meaning = Thank you! Keep fighting!)
| 7 | 7 | "Twins" | 29 March 2018 |
For this week's mini-challenge, the queens will do a twin photoshoot. Année Maywong and Dearis Doll win the mini-challenge. For the first main challenge, the queens will design a conjoined twin outfit with a previous eliminated queen. Année Maywong is paired with Meannie Minaj, B Ella is paired with Bunny Be Fly, Dearis Doll is paired with Petchra and Natalia Pliacam is paired with Amadiva. For the second main challenge, the queens will act out a scene inspired by Plerng Phra Nang. On the runway, category is Water Festival (Songkran). Année Maywong and Natalia Pliacam receive positive critiques. Année Maywong wins both main challenges and the runway challenge. B Ella and Dearis Doll receive negative critiques and are announced as the bottom two. They lip-sync to "Crazy in Love" by Beyoncé. Dearis Doll wins the lip-sync and B Ella sashays away.: Guest Judges: Ploy Chermarn, Utt Uttsada, Chom; Mini-Challenge: Twin photoshoot; Mini-Challenge Winner: Année Maywong and Dearis Doll; Mini-Challenge Prize: Assign pairs for first main challenge; Main Challenge 1: Design conjoined twins outfit out of Eighteen boxes; Main Challenge 1 Winner: Année Maywong and Meannie Minaj; Main Challenge 1 Prize: 40,000฿; Main Challenge 2: Act out a scene inspired by Plerng Phra Nang; Main Challenge 2 + Runway Winner: Année Maywong; Runway Theme: Water Festival (Songkran); Main Challenge 2 and Runway Prize: 30,000฿ gift voucher for ERB spa; Bottom Two: B Ella and Dearis Doll; Lip-Sync Song: "Crazy in Love" by Beyoncé; Eliminated: B Ella; Farewell Message: "ดีใจที่ได้อยู่ครอบครัวนี้ รักทุกคนนะ ♡ ช้างแห่ง DRTH, B Ella" (I'm glad to live in this family. Love you all ♡ elephant of DRTH, B Ella)
| 8 | 8 | "Final Runway" | 5 April 2018 |
All ten queens return for the finale. The finalists all walk the runway to themes of Moulin Rouge and Best Drag. The finalists all then lip-sync to a song of their choice. B Ella is announced this season's Miss Congeniality. It is then announced that Natalia Pliacam is the winner, Année Maywong and Dearis Doll leaving as the runners-up.: Runway Themes: Moulin Rouge and Best Drag; Miss Congeniality: B Ella; Runners-up: Année Maywong and Dearis Doll; Winner of Drag Race Thailand Season One: Natalia Pliacam

== Reception ==
Season 1 of Drag Race Thailand was met with a successful rating in Thai television. It was later announced that the first season will premiere in the United States in May 2018. The first season also made stirs in the Asian LGBTQ community, the most prominent of which is a campaign to establish a RuPaul's Drag Race version as well in the Philippines and Taiwan, two of the most LGBTQ-accepting nations in all of Asia.
