= Mocha Diva =

Filipino drag performer

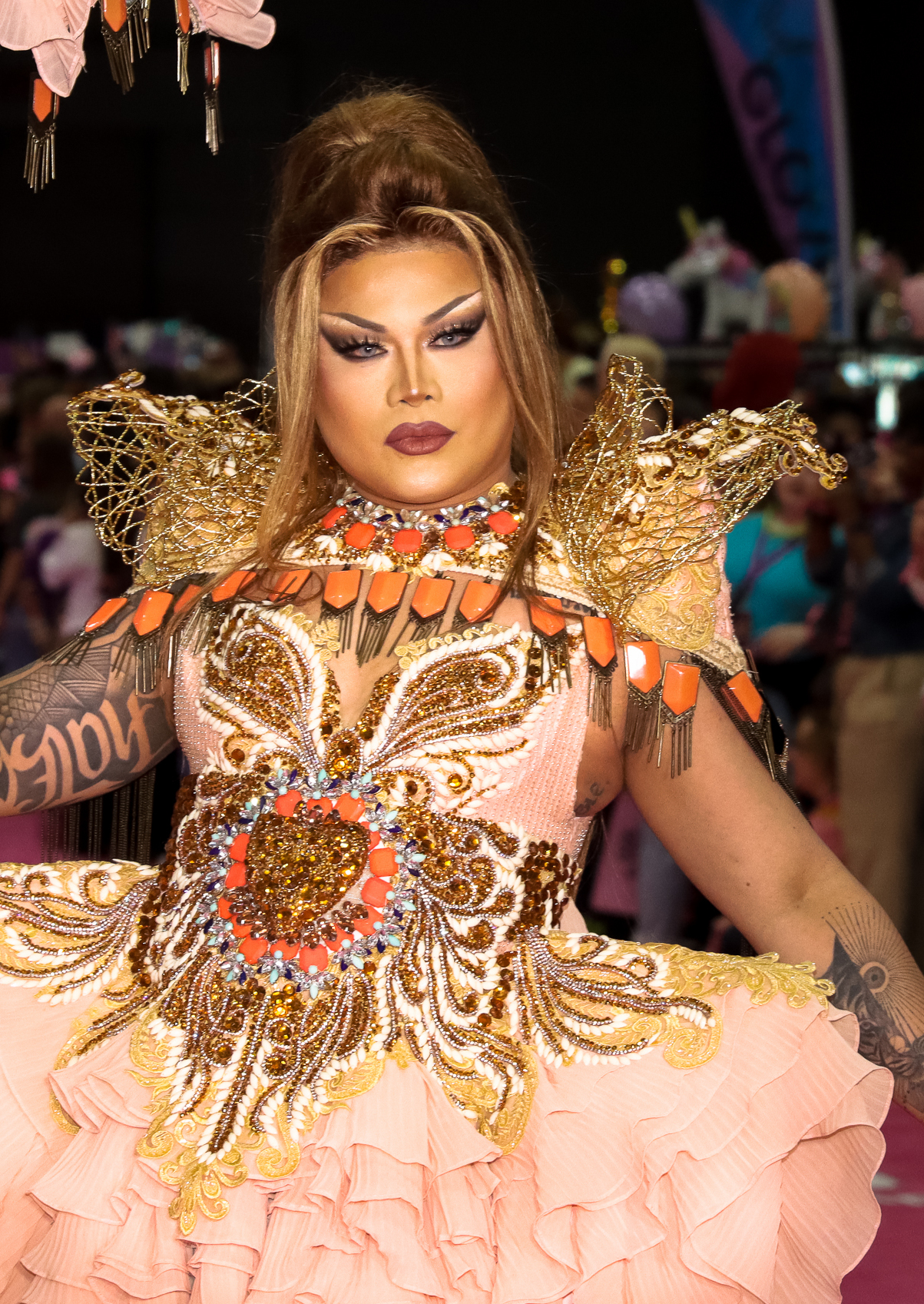
- Mocha Diva at RuPaul's DragCon LA in 2023
- Born: Jay Venn
- Occupation: Drag queen
- Television: Drag Race Thailand (season 2)

Mocha Diva is the stage name of Jay Venn, a Filipino drag queen, based in Hong Kong, who competed on season 2 of Drag Race Thailand.

== Career ==
Venn is a drag queen who has been described as a pioneer of Hong Kong's drag scene by Rappler. He started performing in drag in 2006, and has worked in Manila, Singapore, Thailand, and the United States. In Hong Kong, Venn's drag persona Mocha Diva has been part of the roster at bar and nightclub Petticoat Lane.

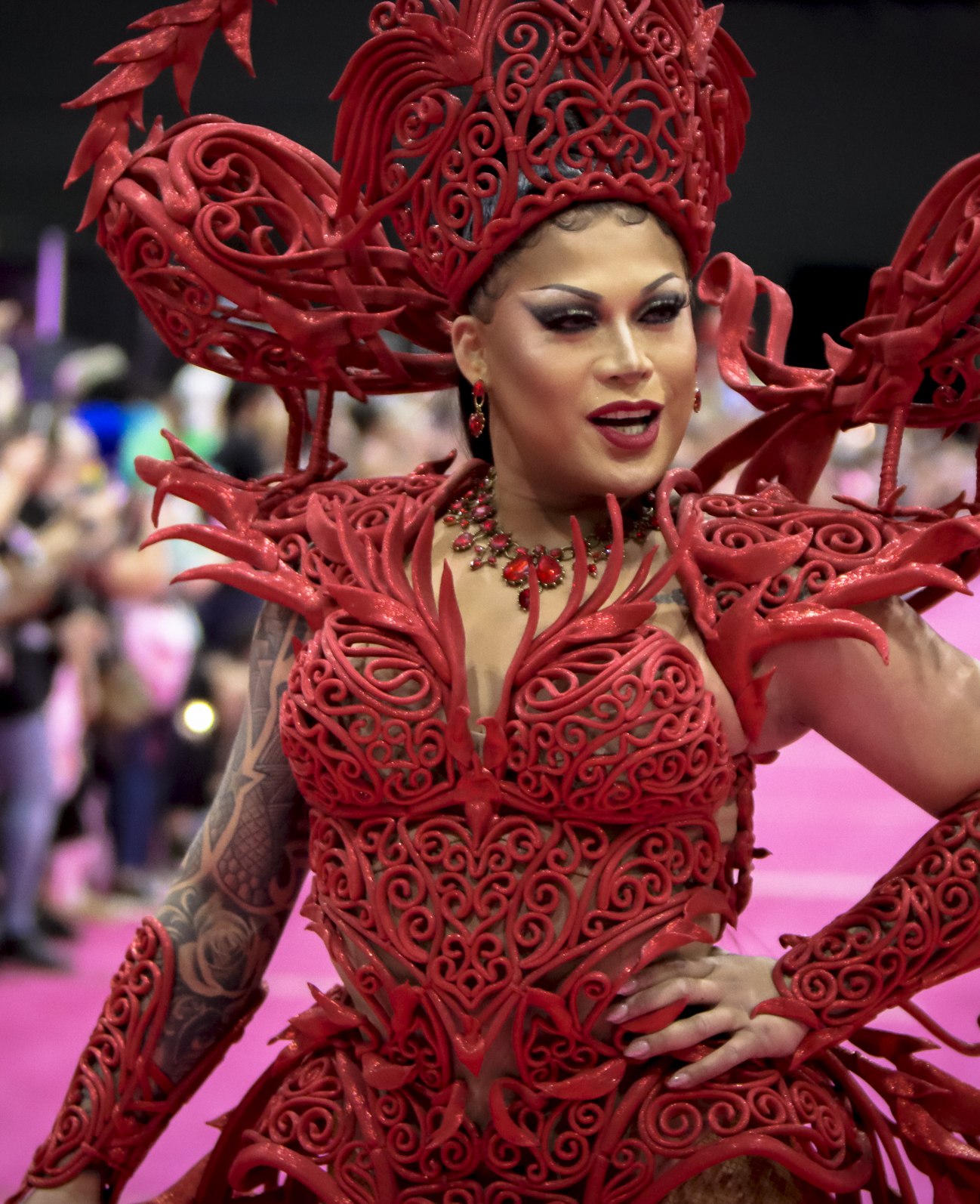
Mocha Diva at RuPaul's DragCon LA, 2022

Mocha Diva competed on season 2 (2019) of Drag Race Thailand. She placed tenth overall. When she was eliminated from the competition, she told the judges that Miss Gimhuay violated rules by using materials inappropriately, resulting in Miss Gimhuay's disqualification. Mocha Diva attended RuPaul's DragCon NYC, and participated in RuPaul's Digital DragCon (2020) during the COVID-19 pandemic.

Rappler said in 2021, "With her muscular built, Mocha Diva mixes her dance moves with acrobatics that show off her athleticism. A trained make-up artist, she uses her skills to create a myriad of looks." In 2023, Bernardo Sim included Mocha Diva in a list of the 30 best "trades of the season" within the Drag Race franchise.

Mocha Diva created Drag Extravaganza, described as "a showcase of themed drag performances for Hong Kong's entertainment scene", and manages the events company Lips Events HK.

Outside of drag, Venn owns Vivere, described by Time Out Hong Kong as a "hip restobar" serving Italian cuisine.

== Personal life ==
Venn is based in Hong Kong. Venn is also famous for being a drag mother to a lot of Filipino drag artists.

== Filmography ==
- Drag Race Thailand (season 2)

== See also ==
- List of drag queens
