= Vanda Miss Joaquim (drag queen) =

Drag performer

- Born: Azizul Mahathir; June 8, 1989 (age 37); Singapore
- Television: Drag Race Thailand (season 2)

Azizul "Izzy" Mahathir (born June 8, 1989), best known by the stage name Vanda Miss Joaquim, is a Singaporean drag performer who competed on the second season of Drag Race Thailand. She is the first Malay Muslim who represented Singapore on the show. She has been described as one of Singapore's most famous drag queens. She operates the House of Miss Joaquim. In 2019, she was a panelist on "All Around the World: International Drag Queens" at RuPaul's DragCon NYC.

== Filmography ==
=== Television ===
- Drag Race Thailand (season 2)

=== Content ===
- The Rise of Vanda Miss Joaquim
