= Genie (drag queen) =

American drag performer

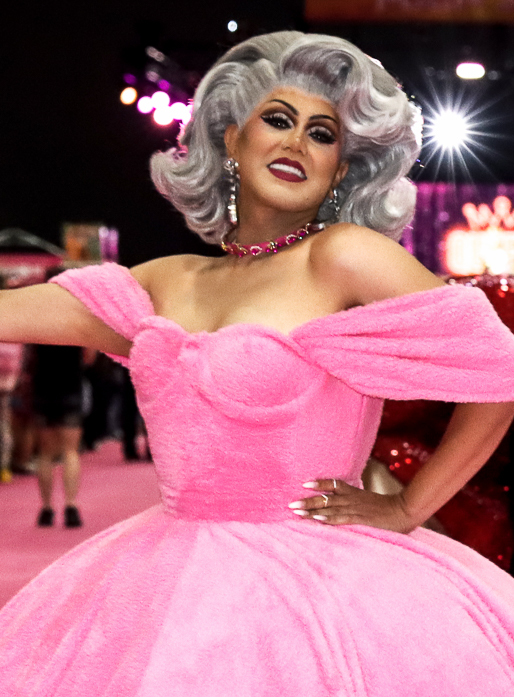
- Genie at RuPaul's DragCon LA, 2024
- Born: Amit Gurnani; California, United States

Amit Gurnani, better known by the stage name Genie, is an American drag performer who competed on the second season of Drag Race Thailand.

== Early life ==
Genie was born in the U.S. state of California.

== Career ==
Genie was the first American to compete on Drag Race Thailand. According to Gay Times, she was the first Hindu and the first contestant of Indian descent to compete on Drag Race. In 2019, she participated in the "All Around the World: International Drag Queens" panel at RuPaul's DragCon NYC.

Gurnani became executive creative director for the Americas region of Virtue, a Vice Media-owned creative agency, in 2020. Prior to that, they were appointed to lead creative for Vice Media Asia-Pacific in 2019.

== Filmography ==
=== Television ===
- Drag Race Thailand (season 2)

=== Content ===
- Finding Family in Bangkok's Rising Drag Scene
- Genie: Transformations with James St. James 531

=== Music videos ===
Year	Title	Artist	Ref
2020	"The Most Office"	Bob the Drag Queen and Peppermint	
