= Drag Race Thailand season 2 =

Drag Race Thailand
- Season 2
- Promotional poster for season two
- Judges: Art Arya; Pangina Heals
- No. of contestants: 14
- Winner: Angele Anang
- Runners-up: Kana Warrior; Kandy Zyanide
- Miss Congeniality: Maya B'Haro
- No. of episodes: 13

Release
- Original network: Kantana Group (Thailand); WOW Presents Plus (International)
- Original release: 11 January – 5 April 2019

Season chronology
- ← Previous; Season 1 Next → Season 3

The second season of Drag Race Thailand had a casting announcement on 4 March 2018. A casting commercial was shown on 13 September 2018, and stated any genders were allowed to apply, as well as non-Thai citizens. Art Arya and Pangina Heals remained as main judges for the season, and the show aired again on the Kantana Group.

The season premiered on 11 January 2019 and ended on 5 April 2019. Beginning on 4 May 2020, the show began airing in America on WOWPresents Plus, with English subtitles.

The winner was Angele Anang, with Kana Warrior and Kandy Zyanide finishing as the runners-up. Miss Congeniality was awarded to Maya B’Haro.

Bandit died on 26 December 2023 at the age of 38, of unknown causes and is the first contestant from Drag Race Thailand to pass away.

== Contestants ==
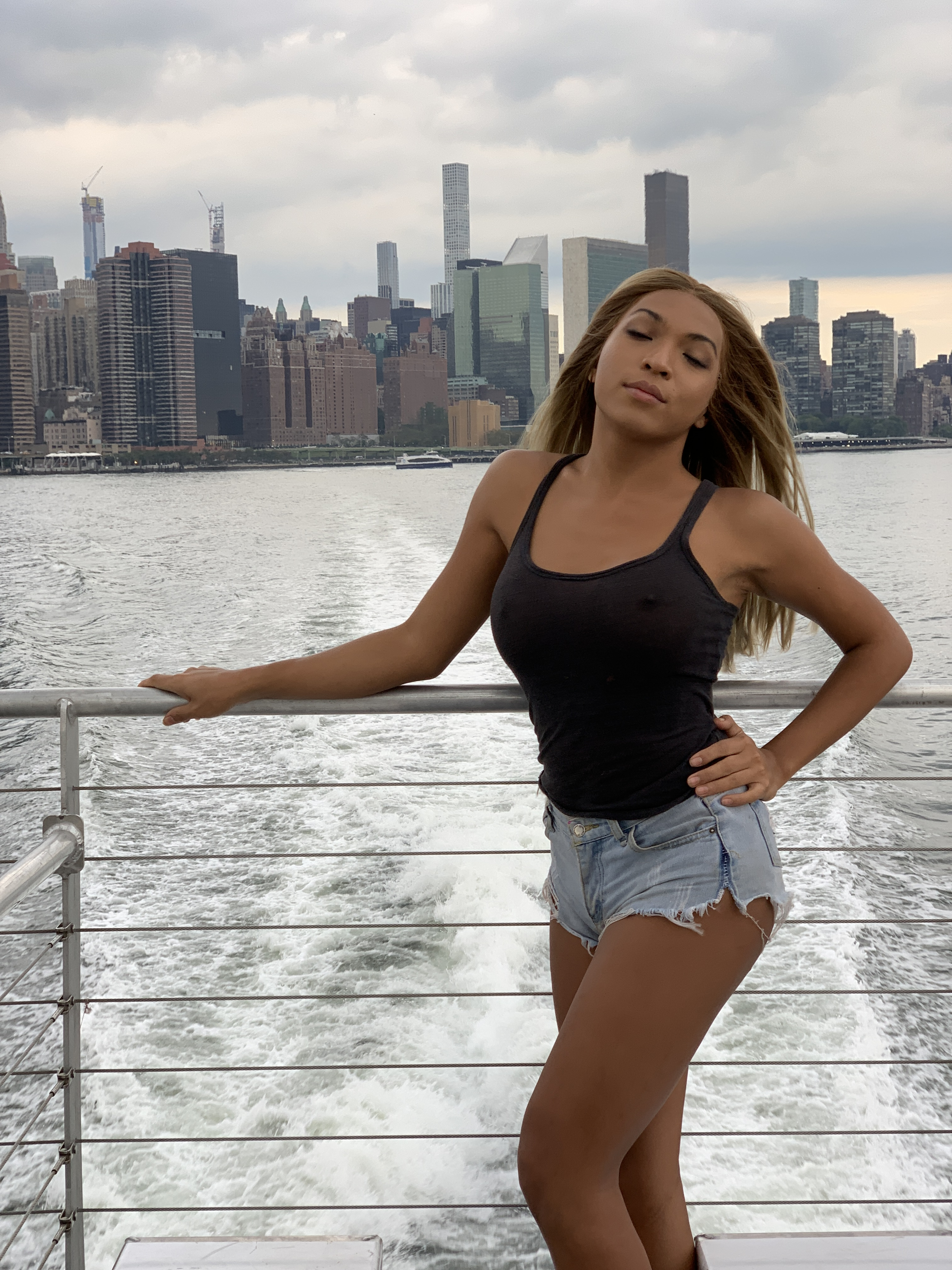
The winner, Angele Anang.

Ages, names, and cities stated are at time of filming.

Contestants of Drag Race Thailand season 2 and their backgrounds
Contestant	Age	Hometown	Outcome
Angele Anang	24	Nakhon Ratchasima	Winner
Kana Warrior	29	Nakhon Sawan	Runners-up (Note: Kana Warrior and Kandy Zyanide originally placed 9th and 11th before re-entering the competition.)
Kandy Zyanide	26	Chiang Mai	Runners-up
Bandit	34	Phrae	4th place
Vanda Miss Joaquim	29	Singapore	4th place
Srimala	29	Udon Thani	6th place
Tormai	28	Nakhon Si Thammarat	7th place
Genie	30	Los Angeles, United States	8th place
Miss Gimhuay	24	Chonburi	Disqualified (Note: Miss Gimhuay was disqualified from the competition due to bringing in props for the runway on the fifth episode that were not originally in the Werkroom, which consisted in a violation of the competition's rules.)
Mocha Diva	30	Hong Kong, China	10th place
Maya B'Haro	33	Phuket	11th place (Note: Maya B'Haro was voted Miss Congeniality.)
Katy Killer	24	Bangkok	12th place
Silver Sonic	22	Khon Kaen	13th place
M Stranger Fox	33	Bangkok	14th place

== Contestant progress ==
Legend:

Angele Anang won Drag Race Thailand season 2.
Kana Warrior and Kandy Zyanide were the runners-up.
Maya B'Haro was voted Miss Congeniality (Miss C).
Kandy Zyanide was voted Drag Pop Star (DPS) by the viewers.
WIN indicates that the contestant won both the maxi and the runway challenges.
TOP indicates that the contestant won the maxi challenge.
RW indicates that the contestant won the runway challenge.
SAFE indicates that the contestant was declared safe by the judges.
IN indicates that the contestant re-entered the competition.
BTM (Bottom) indicates that the contestant was up for elimination.
ELIM (Eliminated) indicates that the contestant was eliminated.
WEL (Winner eliminated) indicates that although the contestant won the maxi challenge, they were the worst in the runway challenge and were subsequently eliminated.
DISQ (Disqualified) indicates that Miss Gimhuay was disqualified for breaking the rules.
Guest indicates that the contestant returned as a guest.

Contestants progress with placements in each episode
Contestant	Episode												
Contestant	1	2	3	4	5	6	7	8	9	10	11	12	13
Angele Anang	TOP	SAFE	SAFE	TOP	TOP	TOP	TOP	RW	BTM	SAFE	BTM	Guest	Winner
Kana Warrior	SAFE	SAFE	BTM	BTM	ELIM			IN	BTM	TOP	RW	Guest	Runner-up
Kandy Zyanide	SAFE	SAFE	SAFE	ELIM				IN	WIN	RW	TOP	DPS	Runner-up
Bandit	SAFE	SAFE	SAFE	SAFE	TOP	SAFE	SAFE	SAFE	SAFE	SAFE	ELIM	Guest	Guest
Vanda Miss Joaquim	SAFE	SAFE	SAFE	SAFE	TOP	RW	BTM	SAFE	SAFE	BTM	ELIM	Guest	Guest
Srimala	RW	SAFE	SAFE	BTM	SAFE	BTM	SAFE	BTM	SAFE	ELIM		Guest	Guest
Tormai	SAFE	SAFE	SAFE	SAFE	SAFE	SAFE	BTM	WEL				Guest	Guest
Genie	SAFE	WIN	SAFE	SAFE	TOP	SAFE	ELIM					Guest	Guest
Miss Gimhuay	SAFE	SAFE	SAFE	SAFE	RW	DISQ						Guest	Guest
Mocha Diva	SAFE	BTM	SAFE	SAFE	TOP	WEL						Guest	Guest
Maya B'Haro	SAFE	SAFE	WIN	SAFE	ELIM							Guest	Miss C
Katy Killer	TOP	SAFE	ELIM									Guest	Guest
Silver Sonic	BTM	ELIM										Guest	Guest
M Stranger Fox	ELIM												Guest

== Lip syncs ==
Legend:

The contestant was eliminated after their first time in the bottom.
The contestant was eliminated after their second time in the bottom.
The contestant was eliminated after their third time in the bottom.
The contestant was eliminated after their fourth time in the bottom.

Episode	Contestants			Song	Eliminated
1	M Stranger Fox	vs.	Silver Sonic	"Born Naked" (RuPaul)	M Stranger Fox
2	Mocha Diva	vs.	Silver Sonic	"I Will Survive หมอลำ (I Will Survive Mor Lam)" (Saisunee Sukkrit)	Silver Sonic
3	Kana Warrior	vs.	Katy Killer	"ขอใจเธอแลกเบอร์โทร (Your Heart for My Number)" (Yinglee Srijumpol)	Katy Killer
4	Kana Warrior vs. Kandy Zyanide vs. Srimala			"จดหมายรักจากเมียเช่า (A Love Letter from a Wife)" (Mani Maniwan)	Kandy Zyanide
5	Kana Warrior	vs.	Maya B'Haro	"สุดฤทธิ์สุดเดช (Suprit Suddet)" (Mai Charoenpura)	Kana Warrior
5	Kana Warrior	vs.	Maya B'Haro	"สุดฤทธิ์สุดเดช (Suprit Suddet)" (Mai Charoenpura)	Maya B'Haro
6	Mocha Diva	vs.	Srimala	"เจ็บนิด...นิด (It Hurts a Little... a Little)" (Rhatha Phongam)	Mocha Diva
7	Genie vs. Tormai vs. Vanda Miss Joaquim			"กินจุ๊บจิ๊บ (Eat Kiss Jib)" (Pornchita na Songkhla)	Genie
8	Srimala	vs.	Tormai	"Lady Marmalade" (Christina Aguilera, Lil' Kim, Mýa, P!nk)	Tormai
9	Angele Anang	vs.	Kana Warrior	"หางเครื่อง (Dancer)" (Sukanya Nakpradit)	None
10	Srimala	vs.	Vanda Miss Joaquim	"This Is Me" (Keala Settle)	Srimala
11	Angele Anang vs. Bandit vs. Vanda Miss Joaquim			"Last Dance" (Selena)	Bandit
11	Angele Anang vs. Bandit vs. Vanda Miss Joaquim			"Last Dance" (Selena)	Vanda Miss Joaquim

== Guest judges ==
Listed in chronological order:

- Yai Amat Nimitpark, photographer
- Pitt Karchai, actor and singer
- Tae Piyarat Kaljareuk, TV executive producer
- Nut Prakopsantisook, photographer
- Sonya Couling, model
- Sakuntala Thianphairot, actress
- Vatanika, model
- Robert Poonpipat, founder and owner of Mambob Company Limited
- Surivipa Poonpipat, actress and comedian
- Cindy Bishop, actress and Beauty Pageant Titleholder
- Pae Arak, actor and musician
- Maria Poonlertlarp, Beauty Pageant Titleholder and model
- John Winyu, TV executive director
- Moo Asava, fashion designer
- James Rusameekae Fagerlund, actor
- Madame Mod, Thai drag queen
- Hungry, German drag queen
- Metinee Kingpayom, actress, model and TV producer
- Khemanit "Pancake" Jamikorn, actress and singer
- Apaporn Nakornsawan, singer
- Jennifer Kim, actress
- Sombat "Tue" Tirasaroj, producer
- New & Jiew, singer
- New Atiwat, public figure
- Petch Paopetch, actor
- Gene Kasidit, singer
- Jai Sira, Thai drag queen

=== Special guests ===
Guests who appeared in episodes, but did not judge on the main stage.

Episode 1

- Amadiva, contestant on the first season of Drag Race Thailand
- Année Maywong, runner-up on the first season of Drag Race Thailand
- B Ella, contestant on the first season of Drag Race Thailand
- Bunny Be Fly, contestant on the first season of Drag Race Thailand
- Dearis Doll, runner-up on the first season of Drag Race Thailand
- JAJA, contestant on the first season of Drag Race Thailand
- Meannie Minaj, contestant on the first season of Drag Race Thailand
- Morrigan, contestant on the first season of Drag Race Thailand
- Natalia Pliacam, winner on the first season of Drag Race Thailand
- Petchra, contestant on the first season of Drag Race Thailand

Episode 6

- Année Maywong, runner-up on the first season of Drag Race Thailand
- Dearis Doll, runner-up on the first season of Drag Race Thailand
- Natalia Pliacam, winner on the first season of Drag Race Thailand

Episode 7

- Fang Nattapong, chef

Episode 11

- Debbie Bazoo, singer

Episode 13

- RuPaul, American drag queen and RuPaul's Drag Race host

== Episodes ==
No. overall	No. in season	Title	Original release date
9	1	"Re-Born This Way"	11 January 2019
Fourteen new drag queens enter the workroom. For the first main challenge, the queens will do a re-born this way photoshoot. For the runway challenge, the queens will create a 10-year-old and a 60-year-old drag persona look. On the runway, Angele Anang, Kandy Zyanide, Katy Killer, Maya B'Haro, Miss Gimhuay, Srimala and Tormai receive positive critiques. Angele Anang and Katy Killer win the main challenge. Srimala wins the runway challenge. M Stranger Fox, Silver Sonic and Vanda Miss Joaquim receive negative critiques, with Vanda Miss Joaquim being safe. M Stranger Fox and Silver Sonic lip-sync to "Born Naked" by RuPaul. Silver Sonic wins the lip-sync and M Stranger Fox is the first queen to sashay away.: Guest Judges: Yai Amat Nimitpark, Pitt Karchai, and Tae Piyarat Kaljareuk; Main Challenge: Re-Born this way photoshoot; Main Challenge Winners: Angele Anang and Katy Killer; Runway Theme: Create a 10-year-old and a 60-year-old drag persona look; Runway Winner: Srimala; Runway Prize: 30,000฿ gift voucher from Footwork; Bottom Two: M Stranger Fox and Silver Sonic; Lip-Sync Song: "Born Naked" by RuPaul; Eliminated: M Stranger Fox; Farewell Message: "SS2 FOREVER M STRANGER FOX"
10	2	"Under the Rainbow"	18 January 2019
For this week's mini-challenge, the queens will match pairs of guys wearing the same color shorts. Kandy Zyanide wins the mini-challenge. For the main challenge, the queens will do a colored powder photoshoot. On the runway, category is Rainbow After the Rain. Genie and Tormai receive positive critiques. Genie wins both the main challenge and the runway challenge. Maya B'Haro, Miss Gimhuay, Mocha Diva, Silver Sonic and Srimala receive negative critiques, with Mocha Diva and Silver Sonic being announced as the bottom two. They lip-sync to “I Will Survive หมอลำ (I Will Survive Mor Lam)” by Saisunee Sukkrit. Mocha Diva wins the lip-sync and Silver Sonic sashays away.: Guest Judges: Nut Prakopsantisook and Sonya Couling; Mini-Challenge: Match pairs of guys wearing the same color shorts; Mini-Challenge Winner: Kandy Zyanide; Main Challenge: Colored powder photoshoot; Main Challenge Winner: Genie; Runway Theme: Rainbow After the Rain; Runway Winner: Genie; Runway Prize: 30,000฿ gift voucher from Erb.; Bottom Two: Mocha Diva and Silver Sonic; Lip-Sync Song: “I Will Survive หมอลำ (I Will Survive Mor Lam)” by Saisunee Sukkrit; Eliminated: Silver Sonic; Farewell Message: "สู้ๆ นะพี่ๆ รีบตามหนูมานะ ^_^ , Sonic" ("Fighting, everyone. Catch up to me soon. Sonic.")
11	3	"Thai Beauty"	25 January 2019
For this week's mini-challenge, the queens will create a crown made from scrap materials. Maya B'Haro wins the mini-challenge. For the main challenge, the queens will do a princess photoshoot. On the runway, category is Sang Thong: Ugly to Pretty. Bandit, Maya B'Haro and Miss Gimhuay receive positive critiques. Maya B'Haro wins both the main challenge and the runway challenge. Kana Warrior, Katy Killer and Tormai receive negative critiques, with Tormai being safe. Kana Warrior and Katy Killer lip-sync to "ขอใจเธอแลกเบอร์โทร" (You're Heart For My Number) by Yinglee Srijumpol. Kana Warrior wins the lip-sync and Katy Killer sashays away.: Guest Judges: Sakuntala Thianphairot and Vatanika; Mini-Challenge: Create a crown from scrap materials; Mini-Challenge Winner: Maya B’Haro; Main Challenge: Princess photoshoot; Main Challenge Winner: Maya B’Haro; Runway Theme: Sang Thong: Ugly to Pretty; Runway Winner: Maya B’Haro; Runway Prize: 30,000฿ gift voucher from MAC Cosmetics; Bottom Two: Kana Warrior and Katy Killer; Lip-Sync Song: "ขอใจเธอแลกเบอร์โทร" (You're Heart For My Number) by Yinglee Srijumpol; Eliminated: Katy Killer; Farewell Message: "สู้ๆ นะทุกคน ฉันยังไม่ตาย ไม่ต้องร้อง E ดอก, Katy Killer" ("Fighting, everyone. I'm not dead yet so don't cry for me, you bitches.")
12	4	"Mother and Daughter"	1 February 2019
For this week's mini-challenge, the queens will pair up and make each other over while blindfolded. Miss Gimhuay wins the mini-challenge. For the main challenge, the queens will give drag makeovers to men in committed relationships, with a bridal theme. On the runway, Angele Anang and Miss Gimhuay receive positive critiques, with Angele Anang winning the challenge. Bandit, Genie, Kana Warrior, Kandy Zyanide, Maya B'Haro, Mocha Diva, Srimala, Tormai and Vanda Miss Joaquim receive negative critiques, with Kana Warrior, Kandy Zyanide and Srimala being announced as the bottom three. They lip-sync to "จดหมายรักจากเมียเช่า" (A Love Letter From A Wife) by Mani Maniwan. Kana Warrior and Srimala win the lip-sync and Kandy Zyanide sashays away.: Guest Judges: Robert Poonpipat and Surivipa Poonpipat; Mini-Challenge: In pairs, make each other over while blindfolded; Mini-Challenge Winner: Miss Gimhuay; Main Challenge: Give drag makeovers to men in committed relationships, with a bridal theme; Main Challenge Winner: Angele Anang; Main Challenge Prize: Two nights and two days at Avani Resort Pattaya, Plus a 30,000฿ voucher; Bottom Three: Kana Warrior, Kandy Zyanide and Srimala; Lip Sync Song: "จดหมายรักจากเมียเช่า" (A Love Letter From A Wife) by Mani Maniwan; Eliminated: Kandy Zyanide; Farewell Message: "โชคดีนะค่ะ ขอโทษที่ทำได้ไม่ดี Love U all ♡ Kandy" ("Good luck. Sorry that I wasn't good enough. Love you all Kandy.")
13	5	"Hollywood Inspirations"	8 February 2019
For this week's mini-challenge, the queens will do an improv acting challenge with models from The Face Men Thailand. Tormai and Vanda Miss Joaquim win the mini-challenge. For the main challenge, the queens will team up and act in a lakorn titled "The Haunting Dolls". Team 1 consists of Angele Anang, Bandit, Genie, Mocha Diva and Vanda Miss Joaquim. Team 2 consists of Kana Warrior, Maya B'Haro, Miss Gimhuay, Srimala and Tormai. On the runway, category is Hollywood in Your Heart. It is announced that Team 1 is the winning team of the main challenge, with Angele Anang, Bandit, Genie, Mocha Diva and Vanda Miss Joaquim all winning the main challenge. Miss Gimhuay wins the runway challenge. Kana Warrior, Maya B'Haro and Tormai receive negative critiques, with Tormai being safe. Kana Warrior and Maya B'Haro lip-sync to “สุดฤทธิ์สุดเดช” (Suprit Suddet) by Mai Charoenpura. After the lip-sync, Art decides to eliminate both Kana Warrior and Maya B'Haro from the competition, and they sashay away.: Guest Judges: Cindy Bishop and Pae Arak; Mini-Challenge: An improv acting challenge with models from The Face Men Thailand; Mini-Challenge Winners: Tormai and Vanda Miss Joaquim; Main Challenge: In teams, the queens must act in a lakorn titled "The Haunting Dolls"; Main Challenge Winners: Angele Anang, Bandit, Genie, Mocha Diva and Vanda Miss Joaquim; Runway Theme: Hollywood in Your Heart; Runway Winner: Miss Gimhuay; Runway Prize: 33,100฿ watch from Victorinox Swiss Army by Timedeco; Bottom Two: Kana Warrior and Maya B’Haro; Lip-Sync Song: “สุดฤทธิ์สุดเดช” (Suprit Suddet) by Mai Charoenpura; Eliminated: Kana Warrior and Maya B’Haro; Maya B’Haro's Farewell Message: "รักทุกคนนะคะ ขอบคุณทุกคนมากๆ ขาดช่างทำผมแล้วนะพวกเธอ Maya" ("I love all of you. Thank you so much. You don't have someone to do your hair anymore though. Maya"); Kana Warrior's Farewell Message: "Smile. KANA WARRIOR"
14	6	"Power of Speech"	15 February 2019
For this week's mini-challenge, the queens will read each other to filth. Tormai wins the mini-challenge. For the main challenge, the queens will do a talk show with the finalists of Drag Race Thailand Season 1.: Yin Yang Show - Miss Gimhuay and Vanda Miss Joaquim; TALK Mai? With Tormai - Bandit and Tormai; CHIT CHAT Tonight - Genie and Srimala; M & A Show - Angele Anang and Mocha Diva; On the runway, category is Miss Star of the Galaxy Pageant. Angele Anang, Miss Gimhuay, Mocha Diva and Vanda Miss Joaquim receive positive critiques. Angele Anang and Mocha Diva both win the main challenge. Vanda Miss Joaquim wins the runway challenge. Srimala and Tormai receive negative critiques, with Tormai being safe. It is then announced that even though for winning the main challenge, Mocha Diva will be in the bottom two because of her runway, besides Srimala. Mocha Diva and Srimala lip-sync to “เจ็บนิด...นิด” (It Hurts A Little... A Little) by Rhatha Phongam. Srimala wins the lip-sync and Mocha Diva sashays away. After the lip-sync, it is announced that Miss Gimhuay brought props to last week's challenge, which was a violation of the rules. Miss Gimhuay is then disqualified from the competition, and sashays away.: Guest Judges: Maria Lynn Ehren, John Winyu, and Moo Asava; Mini-Challenge: Reading is Fundamental; Mini-Challenge Winner: Tormai; Main Challenge: Talk Show with the finalists of Drag Race Thailand Season 1; Main Challenge Winners: Angele Anang and Mocha Diva; Main Challenge Prize: A year supply of premium mink lashes by ChiChi, worth 30,000฿; Runway Theme: Miss Star of the Galaxy Pageant; Runway Winner: Vanda Miss Joaquim; Runway Prize: 50,000฿ gift voucher from APEX Medical Center; Bottom Two: Mocha Diva and Srimala; Lip-Sync Song: “เจ็บนิด...นิด” (It Hurts A Little... A Little) by Rhatha Phongam; Eliminated: Mocha Diva; Disqualified: Miss Gimhuay; Mocha Diva's Farewell Message: "DON'T CHEAT!! M.D."
15	7	"Food Lover"	22 February 2019
For this week's mini-challenge, the queens will create a portrait out of Thai fruits and vegetables. Angele Anang wins the mini-challenge. For the main challenge, the queens will create a runway look inspired by Thai cuisine. On the runway, Angele Anang, Bandit and Srimala receive positive critiques, with Angele Anang winning the challenge. Genie, Tormai and Vanda Miss Joaquim receive negative critiques, and are all announced as the bottom three. They lip-sync to "กินจุ๊บจิ๊บ" (Eat Kiss Jib) by Pornchita na Songkhla. Tormai and Vanda Miss Joaquim win the lip-sync and Genie sashays away.: Guest Judge: James Rusameekae Fagerlund, Madame Mod and Tae Piyarat Kaljareuk; Mini-Challenge: Create a portrait out of Thai fruits and vegetables; Mini-Challenge Winner: Angele Anang; Main Challenge: Create a runway look inspired by Thai cuisine; Main Challenge Winner: Angele Anang; Main Challenge Prize: Two vouchers for a two night/three day stay at Aksorn Rayong The Vitality Collection with a volcano detox treatment from Aksorn Wellness worth ฿55,000; Bottom Three: Genie, Tormai and Vanda Miss Joaquim; Lip-Sync Song: "กินจุ๊บจิ๊บ" (Eat Kiss Jib) by Pornchita na Songkhla; Eliminated: Genie; Farewell Message: "Never forget DRTH SS2, Genie"
16	8	"Heavenly Snatch"	1 March 2019
For this week's main challenge, the queens will play the Snatch Game of Love. Metinee Kingpayom and Khemanit "Pancake" Jamikorn star as the celebrity contestants. The characters are as follows: Angele Anang as Vatanika; Bandit as Ornapha Krisadee; Srimala as Sophia La; Tormai as Thapanee Ietsrichai; Vanda Miss Joaquim as Cardi B; On the runway, category is Cover and Reveal. Angele Anang, Bandit and Tormai receive positive critiques. Tormai wins the main challenge. Angele Anang wins the runway challenge. Srimala and Vanda Miss Joaquim receive negative critiques, with Vanda Miss Joaquim being safe. It is then announced that even though for winning the main challenge, Tormai will be in the bottom two because of her runway, besides Srimala. Srimala and Tormai lip-sync to "Lady Marmalade" by Christina Aguilera, Lil' Kim, Mýa and Pink. Srimala wins the lip-sync and Tormai sashays away. At the end of the episode, Pangina announces that Kana Warrior and Kandy Zyanide will be returning to the competition.: Guest Judges: Hungry, Metinee Kingpayom, and Khemanit "Pancake" Jamikorn; Main Challenge: Snatch Game of Love; Main Challenge Winner: Tormai; Runway Theme: Cover and Reveal; Runway Winner: Angele Anang; Runway Prize: 30,000฿ gift voucher from Anissa Clinic; Bottom Two: Srimala and Tormai; Lip-Sync Song: "Lady Marmalade" by Christina Aguilera, Lil' Kim, Mýa and Pink; Eliminated: Tormai; Farewell Message: "Finally I go to top 5 ขอบคุณสำหรับมิตรภาพและโอกาสนะคะ Always love you DRTHSS2 XOXO, Tormai" ("Finally I go to top 5. Thank you for friendship and opportunity. Always love you DRTHSS2 XOXO, Tormai."); Returned: Kana Warrior and Kandy Zyanide
17	9	"Thai Musical"	8 March 2019
For this week's main challenge, the queens will perform in a musical tribute to Apaporn Nakornsawan. On the runway, category is Pumpuang Duangjan Realness. Bandit, Kandy Zyanide and Vanda Miss Joaquim receive positive critiques. Kandy Zyanide wins both the main challenge and the runway challenge. Angele Anang, Kana Warrior and Srimala receive negative critiques, with Srimala being safe. Angele Anang and Kana Warrior lip-sync to "หางเครื่อง" (Dancer) by Sukanya Nakpradit. After an emotional lip-sync, Art declares them both the winners of the lip-sync and no one is eliminated.: Guest Judges: Apaporn Nakornsawan, Jennifer Kim, and Sombat "Tue" Tirasaroj; Main Challenge: Perform in a musical tribute to Apaporn Nakornsawan; Main Challenge Winner: Kandy Zyanide; Runway Theme: Pumpuang Duangjan Realness; Runway Winner: Kandy Zyanide; Runway Prize: 30,000฿ gift voucher from TichinNintha Shoes for All; Bottom Two: Angele Anang and Kana Warrior; Lip-Sync Song: "หางเครื่อง" (Dancer) by Sukanya Nakpradit; Eliminated: None
18	10	"Family Superheroes"	15 March 2019
For this week's main challenge, the queens will teach an exercise class to senior citizens that is both energizing and entertaining. On the runway, category is Twin Heroes. Angele Anang, Kana Warrior and Kandy Zyanide receive positive critiques. Kana Warrior wins the main challenge. Kandy Zyanide wins the runway challenge. Bandit, Srimala and Vanda Miss Joaquim receive negative critiques, with Bandit being safe. Srimala and Vanda Miss Joaquim lip-sync to "This Is Me" by Keala Settle. Vanda Miss Joaquim wins the lip-sync and Srimala sashays away.: Guest Judges: New & Jiew, New Atiwat and Petch Paopetch; Main Challenge: Teach an exercise class to senior citizens that is both energizing and entertaining; Main Challenge Winner: Kana Warrior; Main Challenge Prize: 30,000฿ gift voucher from Positif, premium Japanese beauty products; Runway Theme: Twin Heroes; Runway Winner: Kandy Zyanide; Runway Prize: Two round-trip plane tickets worth 50,000฿ from Bangkok to Bali courtesy of Thai AirAsia; Bottom Two: Srimala and Vanda Miss Joaquim; Lip-Sync Song: "This Is Me" by Keala Settle; Eliminated: Srimala; Farewell Message: "I L♡VE DRTH SS2 รักทุกคนค่ะ สู้ๆ ต่อนะคะ ศรี มาทำไม อ๋อ! ศรีมาลา" ("I L<3VE DRTH SS2! Keep fighting, I love you all! Srimala")
19	11	"White Elephants"	22 March 2019
For this week's main challenge, the queens will write and record lyrics for a song and perform in a music video. On the runway, category is White Elephant Extravaganza. Kana Warrior and Kandy Zyanide receive positive critiques. Kandy Zyanide wins the main challenge. Kana Warrior wins the runway challenge. Angele Anang, Bandit and Vanda Miss Joaquim receive negative critiques, and are announced as the bottom three. They lip-sync to “Last Dance” by Selena. Angele Anang wins the lip-sync and Bandit and Vanda Miss Joaquim both sashay away.: Guest Judges: Gene Kasidit and Jai Sira; Main Challenge: Write and record lyrics for a song and perform in a music video; Main Challenge Winner: Kandy Zyanide; Main Challenge Prize: Two night stay at Lebua Hotel and Resort in the luxury suite and a 50,000฿ voucher for meals at Tower Club Lounge; Runway Theme: White Elephant Extravaganza; Runway Winner: Kana Warrior; Runway Prize: 50,000฿ beauty gift voucher from Wind Holistic Clinic; Bottom Three: Angele Anang, Bandit and Vanda Miss Joaquim; Lip-Sync Song: “Last Dance” by Selena; Eliminated: Bandit and Vanda Miss Joaquim
20	12	"Queens Reunited"	29 March 2019
All the queens return for the reunion episode. Kandy Zyanide was voted by the public as this season's Drag Pop Star.: Drag Pop Star: Kandy Zyanide; Drag Pop Star Prize: 50,000฿ gift voucher from Masterwork Clinic
21	13	"Final Runway"	5 April 2019
For the final challenge of the season, the queens will direct and perform in their own unique stage show. The queens all walk the runway one last time. Maya B'Haro is announced this season's Miss Congeniality. It is then announced that Angele Anang is the winner, leaving Kana Warrior and Kandy Zyanide as the runners-up.: Main Challenge: Direct and perform in a unique stage show; Runway Theme: Nang Sita 2040 (The Hindu Goddess of Good Fortune and Prosperity); Miss Congeniality: Maya B'Haro; Runners-Up: Kana Warrior and Kandy Zyanide; Winner of Drag Race Thailand Season Two: Angele Anang
