= List of Drag Race Thailand episodes =

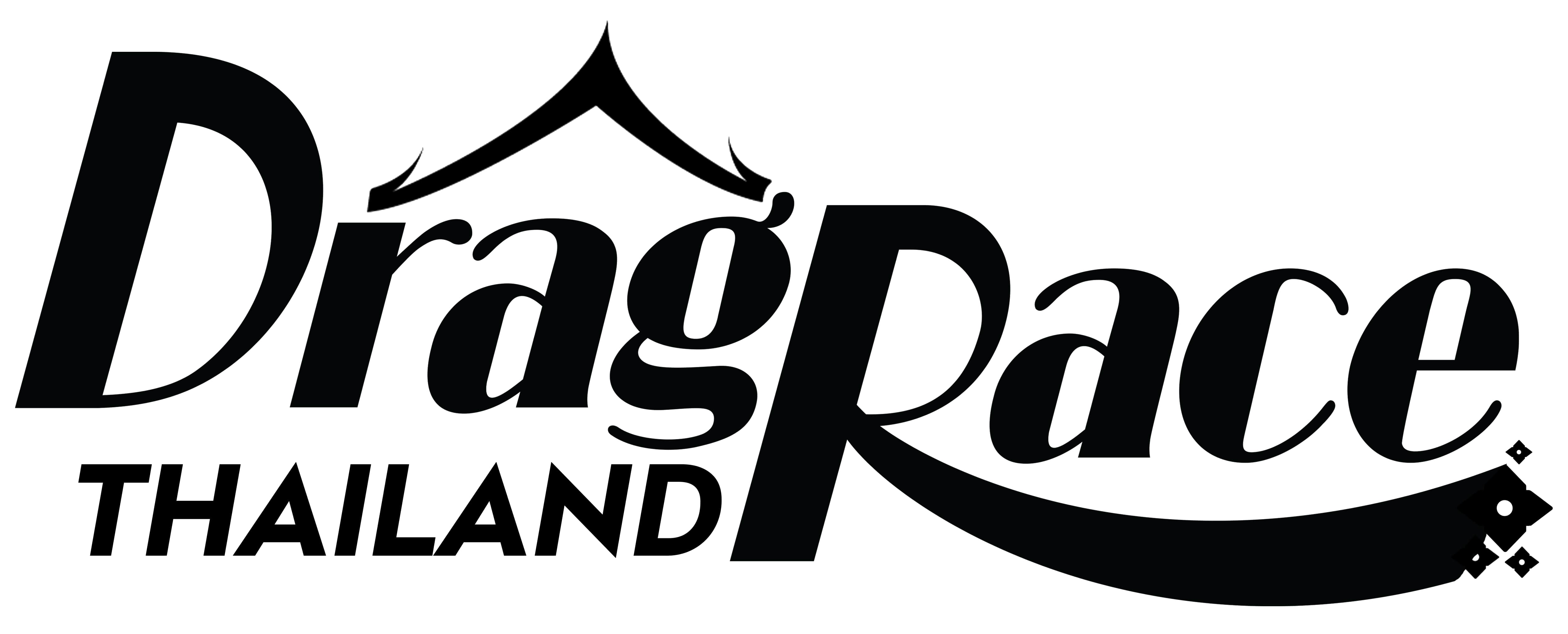
Logo for Drag Race Thailand

Drag Race Thailand is a Thai reality competition television series, based on the American RuPaul's Drag Race. The series was licensed by the Kantana Group and premiered on 15 February 2018. The show is hosted by fashion stylist Art Arya, while drag performer Pangina Heals co-hosts. The series was renewed for a second season in 2018, and the second season began airing on 11 January 2019. In 2021, the series was renewed for a third season.

== Series overview ==
Series	Episodes	Originally released	
Series	Episodes	First released	Last released
1	8	15 February 2018	5 April 2018
2	13	11 January 2019	5 April 2019
3	10	16 October 2024	18 December 2024

== Episodes ==
=== Season 1 (2018) ===
No. overall	No. in season	Title	Original release date
1	1	"Contestant's Story"	15 February 2018
2	2	"The Power of Love"	22 February 2018
3	3	"Curtain to Couture"	1 March 2018
4	4	"Drag Race Thailand Debut Season Award"	8 March 2018
5	5	"Snatch Game"	15 March 2018
6	6	"Commercial, Commercial"	22 March 2018
7	7	"Twins"	29 March 2018
8	8	"Final Runway"	5 April 2018

=== Season 2 (2019) ===
No. overall	No. in season	Title	Original release date
9	1	"Re-Born This Way"	11 January 2019
10	2	"Under the Rainbow"	18 January 2019
11	3	"Thai Beauty"	25 January 2019
12	4	"Mother and Daughter"	1 February 2019
13	5	"Hollywood Inspirations"	8 February 2019
14	6	"Power of Speech"	15 February 2019
15	7	"Food Lover"	22 February 2019
16	8	"Heavenly Snatch"	1 March 2019
17	9	"Thai Musical"	8 March 2019
18	10	"Family Superheroes"	15 March 2019
19	11	"White Elephants"	22 March 2019
20	12	"Queens Reunited"	29 March 2019
21	13	"Final Runway"	5 April 2019

=== Season 3 (2024) ===
No. overall	No. in season	Title	Original release date
22	1	"Thai Tea Is Back Back Back Again"	16 October 2024
23	2	"The Pageant Ball"	23 October 2024
24	3	"Dig Mountain Music Fiercetival"	30 October 2024
25	4	"Acting Is Not Acting, Isn't It?"	6 November 2024
26	5	"Snatch Game"	13 November 2024
27	6	"Hunter, Lover, Mother?"	20 November 2024
28	7	"Yes, and..."	27 November 2024
29	8	"Makeover With Pride"	4 December 2024
30	9	"Tea V Show"	11 December 2024
31	10	"Grand Finale"	18 December 2024
