= Miss Gimhuay =

Thai drag performer

- Born: Warit Kesmanee
- Television: Drag Race Thailand (season 2)

Miss Gimhuay is the stage name of Warit Kesmanee, a Thai drag performer who competed on season 2 of Drag Race Thailand. Miss Gimhuay was disqualified from the competition. She performs at the House of Heals, and appears in the music video for "Got Me Started" (2023) by Troye Sivan.

== Filmography ==
=== Television ===
- Drag Race Thailand (season 2)

=== Music videos ===
- "Got Me Started" (2023) by Troye Sivan
