= Angele Anang =

Thai drag performer

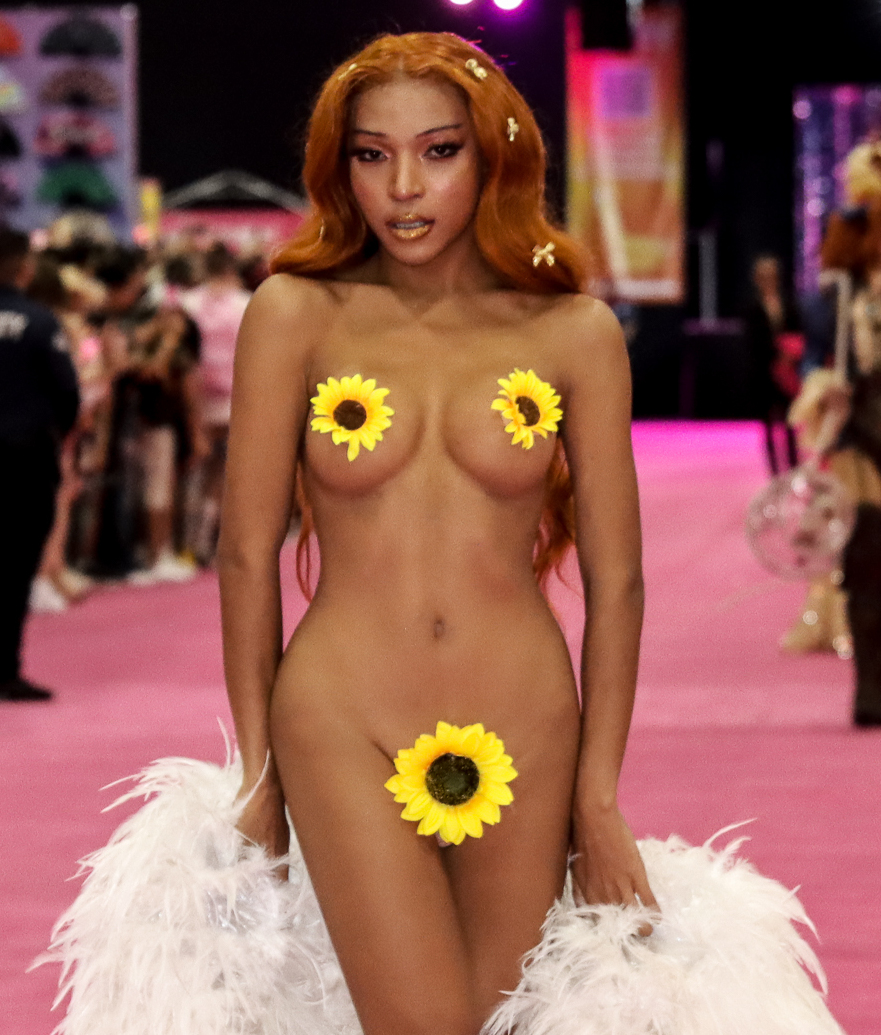
- Angele Anang at RuPaul's DragCon LA in 2024
- Born: September 24, 1994 (age 31); Nakhon Ratchasima, Thailand
- Other name: Angele-Anang Pokinwuttipob
- Occupations: Drag queen; performer; actress; model
- Television: Drag Race Thailand (season 2)
- Website: angeleanang.com

Angele-Anang Pokinwuttipob, known professionally as Angele Anang, is a Thai drag performer, best known for winning the second season of Drag Race Thailand, the Thai spinoff of RuPaul's Drag Race. She was the first transgender winner in the franchise.

== Early life ==
Angele was born in Nakhon Ratchasima in 1994. She lived with her parents in Ayutthaya, she studied at Joseph Ayutthaya school Santi Asoke and Nonformal learning school.

As a teenager, Angele’s mother died from breast cancer she had a history of physical abuse by her father and drug abuse. After rehabilitation, she briefly became a monk.

== Career ==
Angele was a successful Beyonce impersonator. She has her first act in a transgender cabaret show in Bangkok, Calypso Cabaret. Angele was announced as one of the fourteen contestants for the second season of Drag Race Thailand, that began airing on January 11, 2019. Throughout her time in the competition, she won six challenges, more than any other queen in the franchise's history. On April 5, she was crowned the winner. She is the first trans woman to win a season of Drag Race.

In 2019, Angele spoke at DragCon NYC's "All Around the World: International Drag Queen" panel. Angele was a featured performer of Xtra in 2020, a digital drag show created to support drag queens struggling from the economic impact of the COVID-19 pandemic. Later that year, she was a featured performer of Oaklash, which was also held virtually.

She is also a notable pro-democracy activist in Thailand.

== Filmography ==
=== Television ===
Year	Name	Role	Note
2019	I Can See Your Voice Thailand season 3	Herself	Mystery singer
2019	Drag Race Thailand	Herself	Contestant (Season 2)
2022	Project Runway Thailand	Herself	Model
2024	Drag Race Thailand	Herself	Special guest (Season 3)

=== Web series ===
Year	Name	Role	Note	Reference
2019	Bootleg Opinions	Herself	Guest, Episode: "Drag UK's Drag Con NY 2019 Looks"	

=== Music videos ===
Year	Name	Artist	Reference
2019	"Contrast"	Preen	
2023	"Got Me Started"	Troye Sivan	

=== Movies ===
Year	Name	Role	Reference
2023	Farang	Prostitute	
