= Natalia Pliacam =

Thai drag performer

- Born: Assadayut Khunviseadpong; January 7, 1980 (age 45); Bangkok, Thailand
- Occupation: Drag queen
- Known for: Winner of Drag Race Thailand (season 1)
- Successor: Angele Anang

Natalia Pliacam is the stage name of Assadayut Khunviseadpong, a Thai drag performer, best known for winning the first season of Drag Race Thailand, the Thai spinoff of RuPaul's Drag Race.

== Biography ==
Khunviseadpong is of Chinese descent, and he owns a coffin-manufacturing company based in the Chinatown area of Bangkok. He took dance classes starting in 1997 and taught cheerleading to deaf students for ten years at the Rangsit University Student Club. He started doing drag in 2006, when he entered and won the "Miss AC/DC" beauty pageant, that involves creating a persona specific to a country. He chose the United States, and the name Natalia Pliacam comes from Miss Universe 2005 Natalie Glebova and a painkiller brand. The "Pliacam" part of his drag name is also play on words that can be translated to "tired labia" in English. He is gay.

== Drag Race ==
Pliacam was announced as one of ten contestants for the first season of Drag Race Thailand that began airing on February 15, 2018. During the show, Pliacam won three main challenges and one runway challenge. She advanced in the top three with Annee Maywong and Dearis Doll to the live finale episode on April 5, 2018. He performed a custom lip sync to Whitney Houston's "Queen of the Night" for his last challenge. Pliacam is the first plus-size winner of the Drag Race franchise; she would later be followed by Lawrence Chaney who won Series 2 of RuPaul's Drag Race UK.

== Politics ==
On February 5, 2019, Pliacam announced she was running for Congress, gunning for a seat with the Local Thai Party, campaigning on a strong platform of LGBTIQ+ issues.

== Filmography ==
=== Television ===
Year	Title	Role	Notes
2018	Drag Race Thailand	Herself	Contestant - Winner
2019	Lip Sync Battle Thailand	Herself	Guest

=== Web series ===
Year	Title	Role	Notes	Ref.
2018–Present	DragDaek	Herself	Co-Host	
