= Année Maywong =

Thai drag performer

- Born: Thanisorn Hengsoontorn
- Television: Drag Race Thailand (season 1)

Année Maywong is the stage name of Thanisorn Hengsoontorn, a Thai drag performer and fashion designer who competed on season 1 of Drag Race Thailand.

== Career ==
Année Maywong was a runner-up on season 1 of Drag Race Thailand. She competed at the age of 30. According to Lifestyle Asia, she is also a coach at Muse by Metinee, "a school specialising in the modeling and the entertainment industry." She has performed at the House of Heals, and appears in the music video for "Got Me Started" (2023) by Troye Sivan.

Hengsoontorn is based in Bangkok. Outside of drag, he is a government worker.

== Filmography ==
=== Television ===
- Drag Race Thailand (season 1)

=== Music videos ===
- "Got Me Started" (2023) by Troye Sivan

== See also ==
- List of drag queens
