= Line Mobile =

Division of Line Corporation

Line Mobile Corporation
- Logo used internationally

- Logo used in Thailand
- Company type: Subsidiary
- Founded: 21 September 2016; 9 years ago (Japan); September 2017; 8 years ago (Thailand); 24 April 2018; 8 years ago (Taiwan)
- Defunct: 1 March 2022
- Parent: Line Corporation
- Website: mobile.line.me (Japan) www.linemobile-tw.com (Taiwan) finnmobile.io/th/ (Thailand)

Line Mobile (known as Finn Mobile in Thailand; stylised in all caps) is a mobile virtual network operator (MVNO) which operates in Japan, Thailand, and Taiwan under partnerships with Line Corporation.

== History ==
Line Mobile was launched in Japan in September 2016 by LINE MOBILE Corporation, a subsidiary of Line Corporation. It initially operated on the NTT DoCoMo network. In Japan, Line Mobile offers plans including free access to LINE application and social network services.

In January 2018, it was announced that LINE Corporation and SoftBank Corp had signed a partnership for Line Mobile. As a result, SoftBank would hold a 51% stake in Line Mobile Corporation. Line Mobile began using the SoftBank network in Japan in July 2018.

== International operations ==
=== Thailand ===
Line Mobile operates in Thailand as a sub-licensing brand on the traditional mobile operator dtac, as its agreement with Line Mobile Thailand is limited to brand licensing. The setup, which is similar to Virgin Mobile's MVNO licensing setup was challenged by telecom consultants, and the network operators, Advanced Info Service and TrueMove, for setting up a MVNO, without a MVNO license, to avoid paying regulatory fees.

The National Broadcasting and Telecommunications Commission (NBTC), decided Line Mobile would not have to apply for a license under the mobile virtual network operator (MVNO) scheme, despite being classified as a MVNO in Japan and Taiwan. However, in its resolution, the NBTC board will keep monitoring Line Mobile and ordered it to amend its online registration system as it violates existing regulations, which require registration to be done at a service point in person with an ID card. The NBTC also ordered Line Mobile to improve awareness of the product's features and ownership to its customers, many of whom may lack of essential information about the service, said NBTC secretary-general Takorn Tantasith. "Line Mobile must strictly adhere to the order of the NBTC board, or face punishment by the regulator," Mr Takorn said.

On 16 September 2019, Line Mobile Thailand announced it would be renamed to Finn Mobile.

Dtac has yet provided any public information about the number of subscribers of Finn Mobile, since its launch a year ago.

=== Taiwan ===
Line Mobile operates in Taiwan on the Chunghwa Telecom network. The service was originally launched in 2018 through a partnership with Far EasTone, which expired on 19 April 2021 and saw Line Mobile customers folded into Far EasTone. The current iteration of Line Mobile on Chunghwa's network was launched on 18 April 2023.
