= RuPaul's DragCon NYC =

Drag culture exposition in New York City

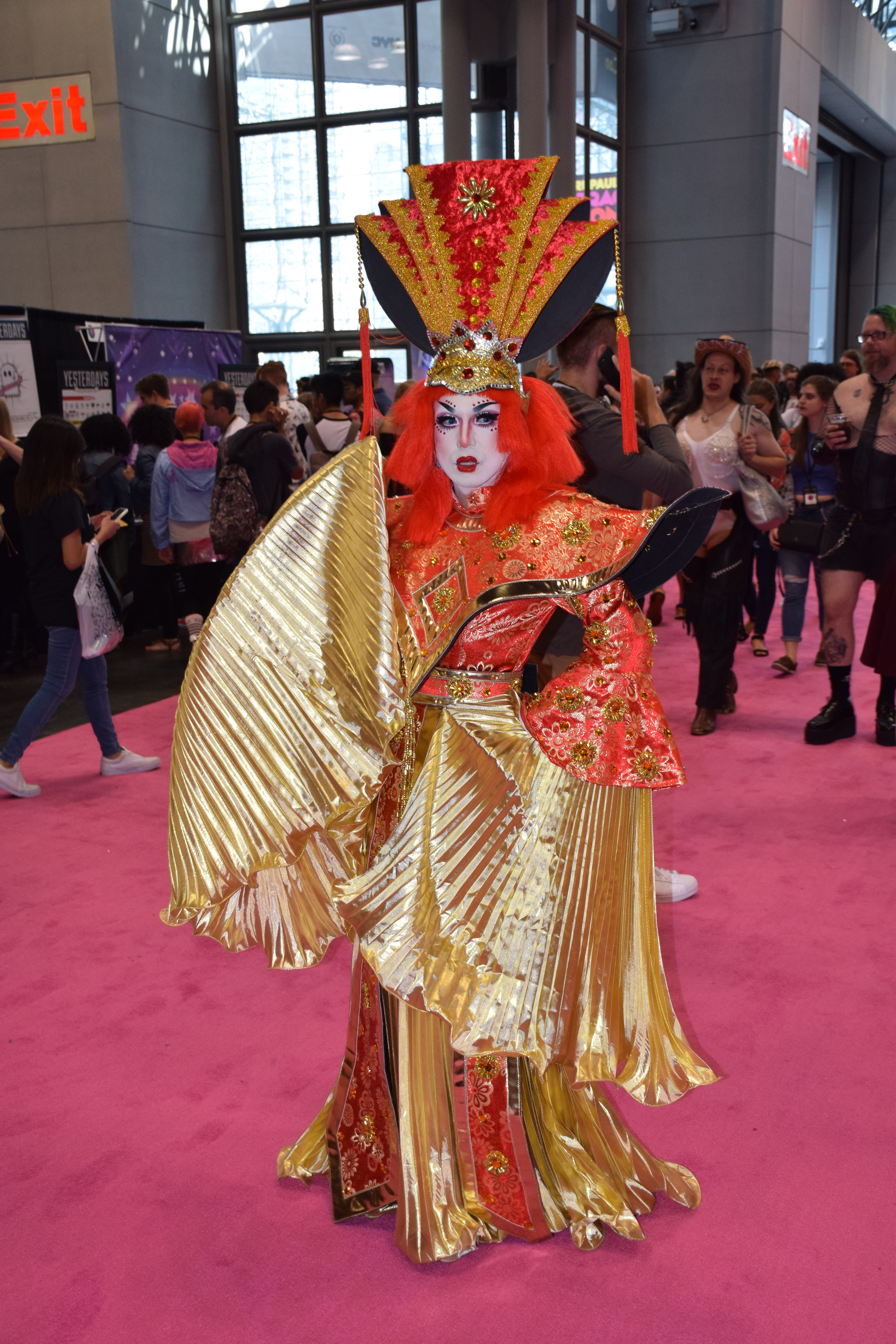
RuPaul's DragCon NYC, 2017

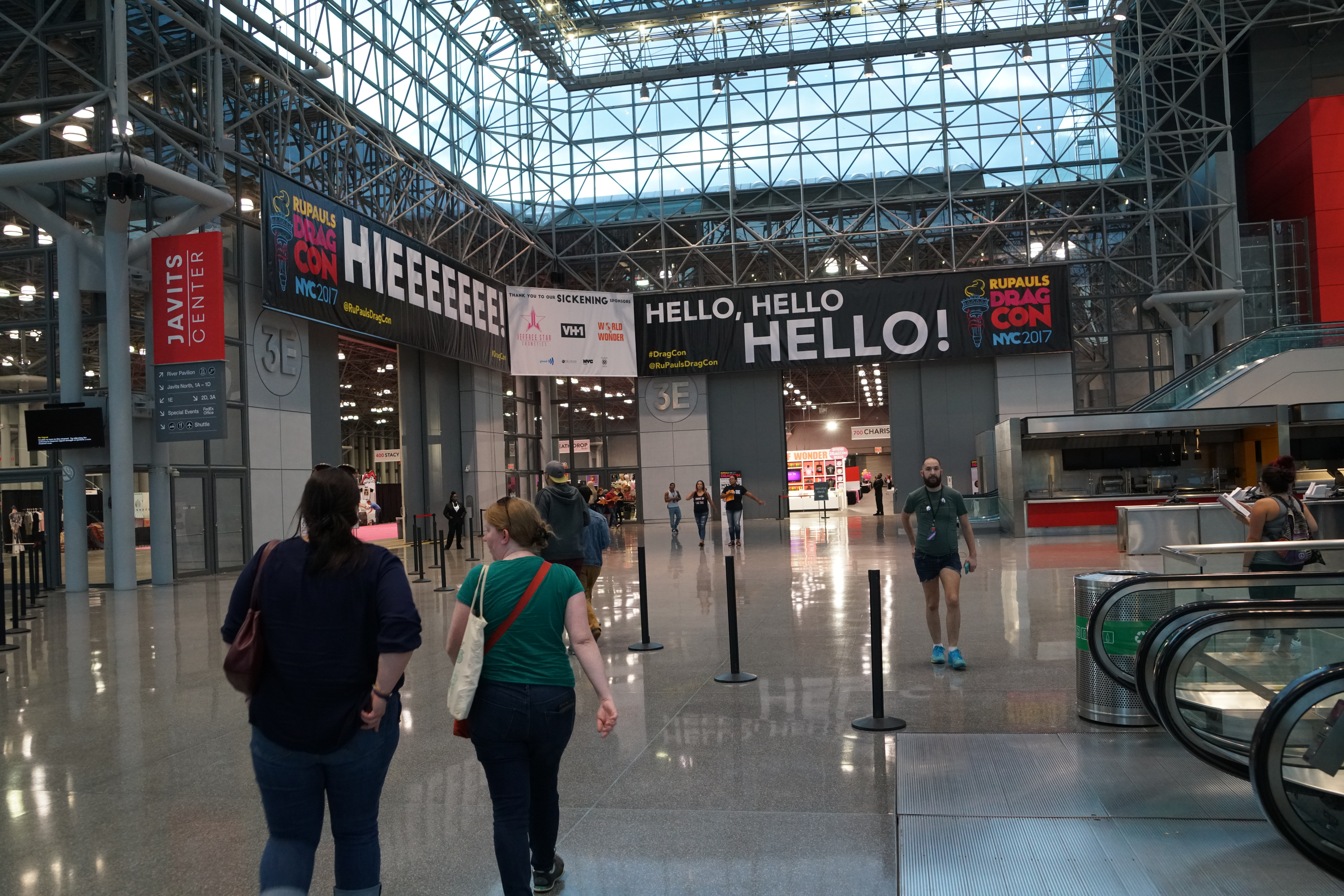
The entrance of RuPaul's DragCon in NYC in 2017

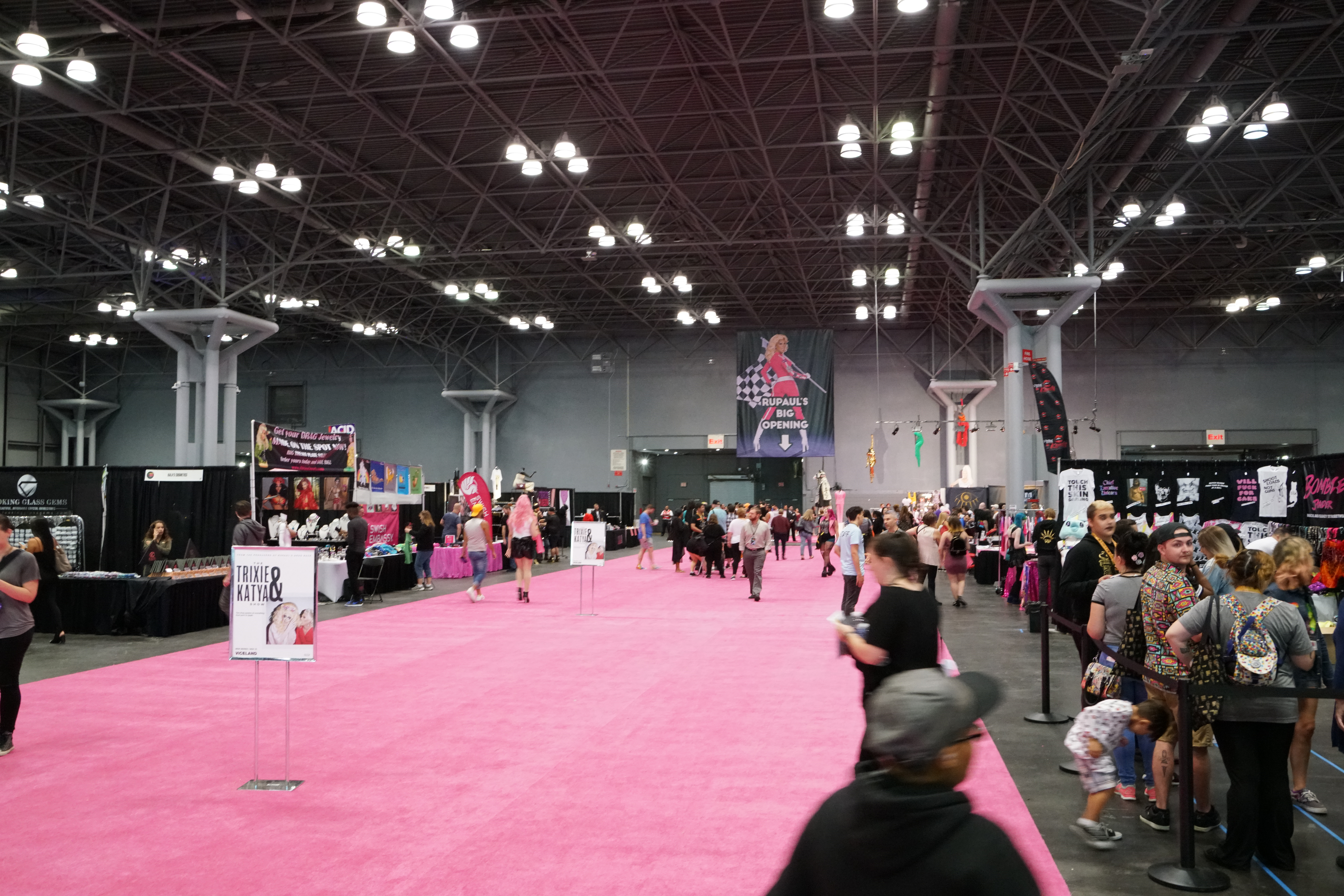
RuPaul's DragCon in NYC in 2017

RuPaul's DragCon NYC is an annual fan convention and expo of drag culture held in New York City, which debuted in September 2017. The convention is based on the successful RuPaul's DragCon LA which was launched in Los Angeles in 2015 billed as a “convention that celebrates ‘the art of drag, queer culture and self-expression for all’”. The NYC event is considered the "world's largest celebration of drag culture" with 100,000 attendees. The event is an outgrowth of the internationally successful RuPaul's Drag Race, which generated Drag Race Thailand, RuPaul's Drag Race UK, RuPaul's Drag Race All Stars, and Chile's The Switch Drag Race. RuPaul's Drag Race and the two DragCons come from World of Wonder Entertainment (WOW), a production company based in Los Angeles. The first RuPaul's DragCon NYC was held in 2017 at the Javits Center, with over 40,000 attendees at the two-day all-ages event; it “garnered 687 million (online) impressions in 2018.” Based on the success of the original LA event, the NYC event expanded to three days in 2019: both had over 100,000 attendees in 2019.

At RuPaul's DragCon NYC, past RuPaul's Drag Race contestants and other well-known drag artists meet with fans, take pictures, sign autographs, and sometimes perform or take part in discussion panels, as well as sell merchandise. The discussion panels vary from more obvious topics like clothing, fashion, wigs, and makeup, to history of drag, drag activism, trans rights, queer pop culture, and political issues facing the LGBTQ community. WOW's co-director and producer of the convention, Randy Barbato, shared that ironically the panels have significant depth, because although drag queens are known for being fun and about their looks, the queens are smart artists and activists. He also said, "For us, drag has always been political!" The main stage presents performances and runway events all day long. There are also over 220 vendors offering drag supplies and accessories; at the 2018 event they sold over $8 million in merchandise.

According to Glossy, “the event’s core demographic are 18- to 34-year-olds, with 60% female attendees and 40% male. About 60% of DragCon’s audience identify as LGBTQ and 40% as heterosexual.” Kids under ten are let in free when accompanied by an adult. IndieWire notes that DragCon is similar to the annual Burning Man art festival in that attendees exhibit radical self-expression, the culture is participatory and inclusive, and what is presented is ephemeral.

== History ==
=== Background ===
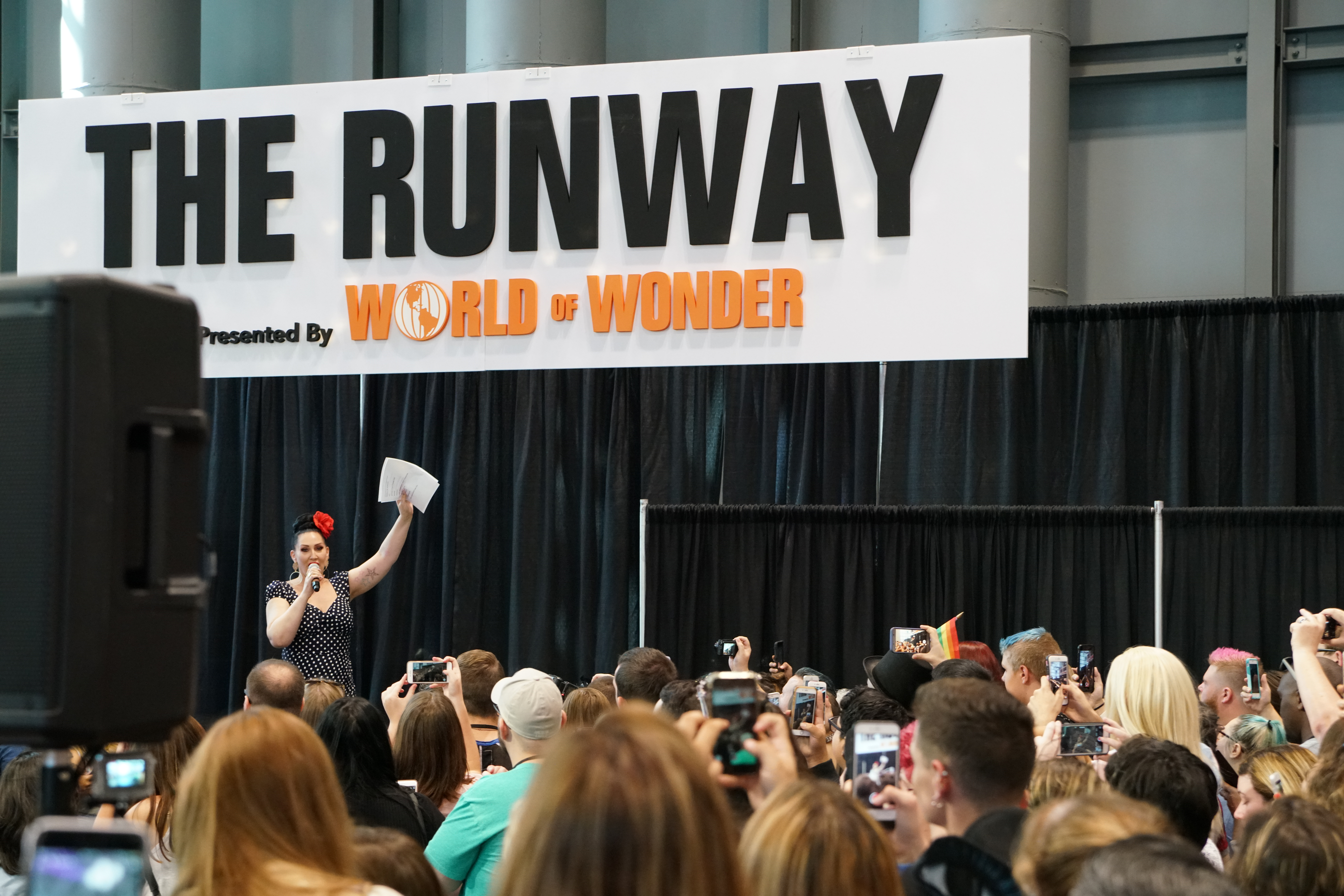
Michelle Visage at RuPaul's DragCon in NYC in 2017

It is based on the successful RuPaul's DragCon LA which was launched in Los Angeles in 2015, and considered the "world's largest celebration of drag culture" with 50,000 attendees. The event is an outgrowth of the internationally successful RuPaul's Drag Race, which generated Drag Race Thailand, RuPaul's Drag Race UK, RuPaul's Drag Race All Stars, and Chile's The Switch Drag Race. RuPaul's Drag Race and the two DragCons come from World of Wonder Entertainment (WOW), a production company based in Los Angeles.

WOW opted to start producing the New York City event to "return to their roots", as they met RuPaul in the 1980s in the city and have worked with her since then.

=== 2018 ===
The 2018 event was held in September at The Javits Center, and expanded to three days, with 50,000 attendees. One of the notable panels was "Beyond the Binary", with Aja, performance artist Alok Vaid-Menon, and actor Nico Tortorella discussing "how can we make the world more inclusive of non-binary and gender non-conforming people?" As a first, RuPaul met with fans face-to-face taking part in panels and runway events. RuPaul hosted RuTalks, one discussing the political climate with a Trump administration with New York Times columnist Charles M. Blow.

Another highlight was the staging of an all-ages version of Sasha Velour's popular monthly drag show Nightgowns. A surprising non-drag vendor booth was The Warwick Rowers project, a gay/straight alliance of the men rowers of the University of Warwick Boat Club. Since 2009, the athletic men have posed nude for calendars and other products, shipped to eighty countries, raising over $1 million, with their campaign to fight homophobia in sports reaching 140 countries.

The New York convention included a 'Kids Zone' featuring Drag Queen Story Hour, arts and crafts, and other children's activities. This event coincided with an increasing visibility of drag performers among younger audiences, a trend noted by drag historian Joe E. Jeffreys.

=== 2019 ===
RuPaul's RuTalks, where she interviews celebs on the main stage will take place again: Women’s Wear Daily confirmed Diane von Fürstenberg will be interviewed by RuPaul on Saturday of the event. Included in the interview will be Fürstenberg's efforts to raise funds for a museum at the base of the Statue of Liberty, and her role in the HBO documentary Liberty: Mother of Exiles. On Sunday, the featured guest is Whoopi Goldberg, a longtime ally of the LGBTQ communities.

In July 2019, it was announced that the inaugural drag queens for RuPaul's Drag Race UK, which airs in September, will be introduced at DragCon NYC.

On the Saturday of the expo, Yvie Oddly, winner of season eleven of Drag Race, was named as one of a rotating cast of a dozen Drag Race queens in RuPaul's Drag Race Live!, a Las Vegas show residency from January to August 2020 at the Flamingo Las Vegas. The show will feature RuPaul’s music and seven of the twelve queens: Oddly, Aquaria (winner of season ten), Asia O'Hara (season ten), Coco Montrese (season five, All Stars season two), Derrick Barry (season eight), Eureka O'Hara (season nine and ten), India Ferrah (season three), Kahanna Montrese (season eleven), Kameron Michaels (season ten), Kim Chi (season eight), Naomi Smalls (season eight), and Shannel (season one, All Stars one).

A UK version of the convention was announced at DragCon NYC 2019. RuPaul's DragCon UK will be held at Olympia London in January 2020.

This year’s event included efforts to politically activate attendees by registering people to vote, and through seminars on organizing for equal LGBTQ rights. A first for DragCon was a booth and representation of a U.S. Presidential candidate; organizers reached out to all the 2020 Democratic Party presidential candidates, but only Senator Elizabeth Warren, from Massachusetts, had her campaign represented. LGBTQ voters overwhelmingly skew to the Democratic Party. Warren had a booth with Shea Couleé (Drag Race season nine) speaking with potential voters about the presidential election.

== Community safe space ==
RuPaul's Drag Race co-judge and one of RuPaul’s best friends, Michelle Visage, who has a child in the cosplay community, shared that DragCons are a safe space for the all-ages and LGBTQ communities. Possibly the only one many of the attendees have ever experienced, where being different and LGBTQ is celebrated. Visage stated, “It’s a safety zone for these kids to know they won’t be judged, they won’t be heckled, they won’t be jeered, it will all be cheers and love and community." In addition to the Kids Zone, DragCon has Drag Queen Story Hours and a Kids Fashion Show.

== Booths ==
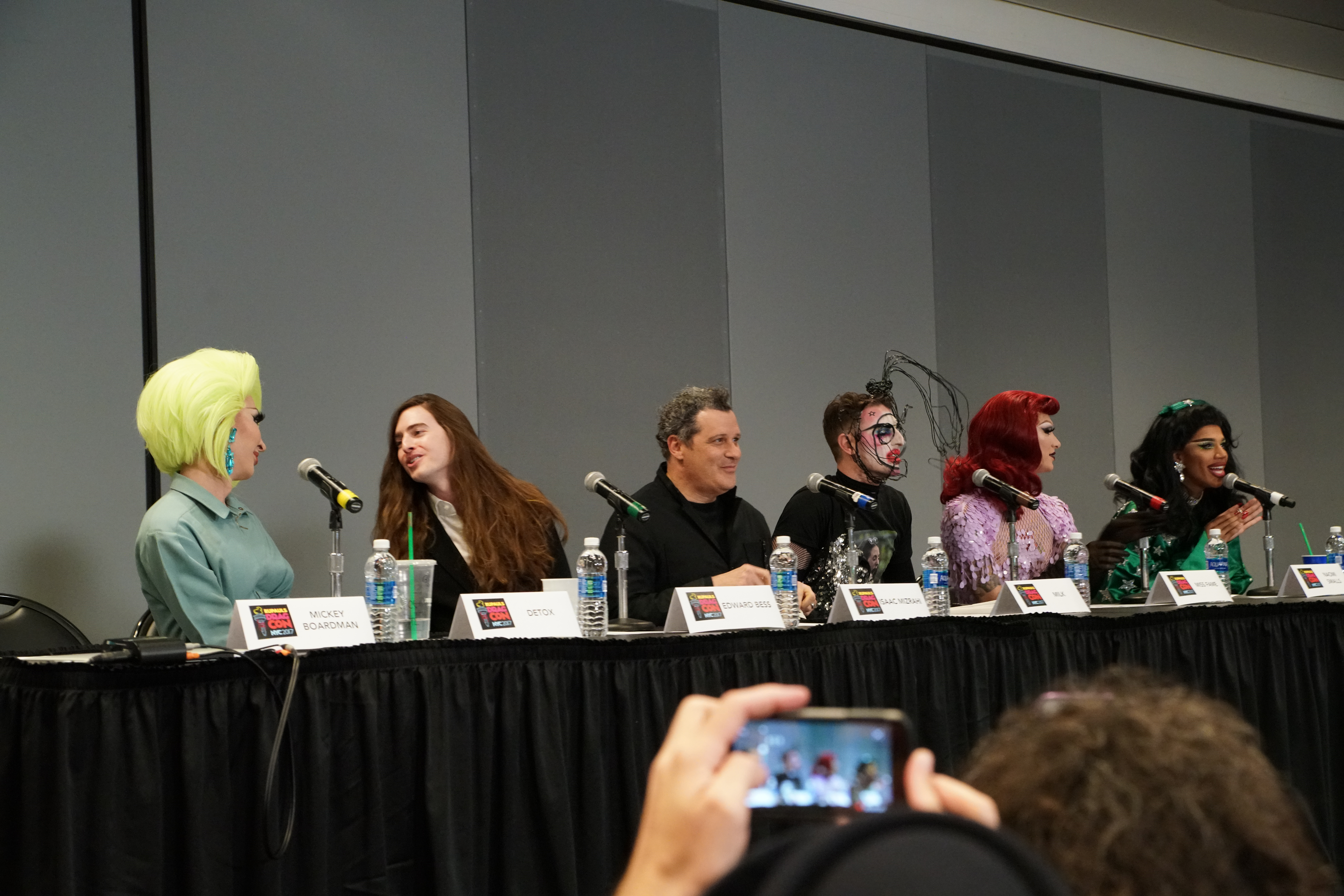
Discussion panel, 2017

RuPaul's DragCon NYC is a convention where drag artists and past RuPaul's Drag Race contestants meet fans, take photographs, sign autographs, perform, participate in panel discussions, and sell merchandise. Exhibitors set up custom-designed booths to promote their brands. The event, curated by World of Wonder (WOW) co-founders Fenton Bailey and Randy Barbato, features themed attractions, dedicated areas such as a children's zone, and various interactive experiences

There is also hundreds of vendors offering drag supplies and accessories.

=== Beauty influencers ===
According to WOW’s Bailey, “RuPaul was the first drag queen associated with beauty, with MAC Cosmetics in the ’90s.” RuPaul’s Drag Race has highlighted how the drag queens embrace and use make-up as “drag queen(s) stress-tests the best beauty products”; many are also beauty influencers for various brands including their own; some of whom have booths at the convention to sample and sell products. Glossy notes that of “beauty festivals” DragCon NYC is one of few with “ultra-engaged audiences.” The event will have more than fifty beauty exhibitors including a sponsorship with Wet N Wild, one of California-based Markwins Beauty Brands‘ cosmetics and skin care companies, WOW’s “first partnership combining both of its hero properties, DragCon and WOW Presents.” WOW’s YouTube channel will run an eight-part unscripted series featuring a DragCon attendee being given make-up and beauty advice by Raven—who placed as runner up on both the second season of the show, and the first season of RuPaul's Drag Race All Stars—and is RuPaul’s personal make-up artist.

In 2015, the first year of DragCon LA, there were eight beauty companies presented. DragCon “has seen 615% year-over-year growth in beauty vendors and sponsors”; with “more than $8.2 million in on-site sales in 2018, and 93% of attendees purchased merchandise valued at $200 or more.”

== Interacting with drag queens ==
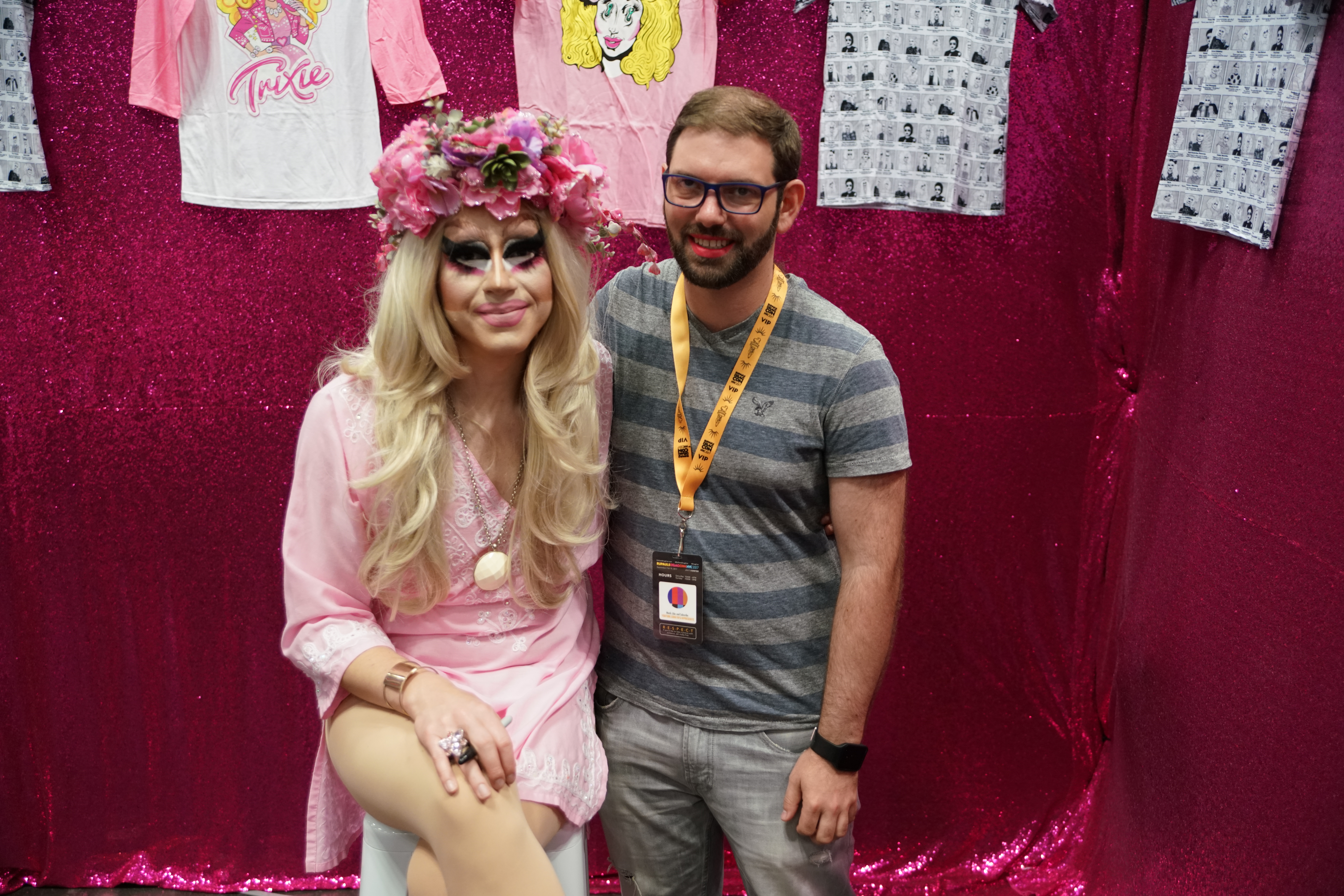
Fan posing with Trixie Mattel, 2017

Ginger Minj, when asked the value in meeting fans personally, said it helps humanize the drag queen they've only seen on the screen, and "helps them realize that this is a serious job for us, not just fun and games on TV". She notes that the queens have a job because of the fans so she cultivates positive relationships with them. “It’s really cool just having a bigger platform (because) everyone gets to see more of what I do,” stated Ariel Versace, RPDR season eleven contestant, “you get more recognized for the hard work that you put into your drag.”

== See also ==
- Drag culture in New York City
- Drag Kids
- LGBTQ culture in New York City
- List of LGBTQ people in New York City § Drag
- NYC Drag March
- Wigstock
