= Drag Race Thailand =

Thai reality television series

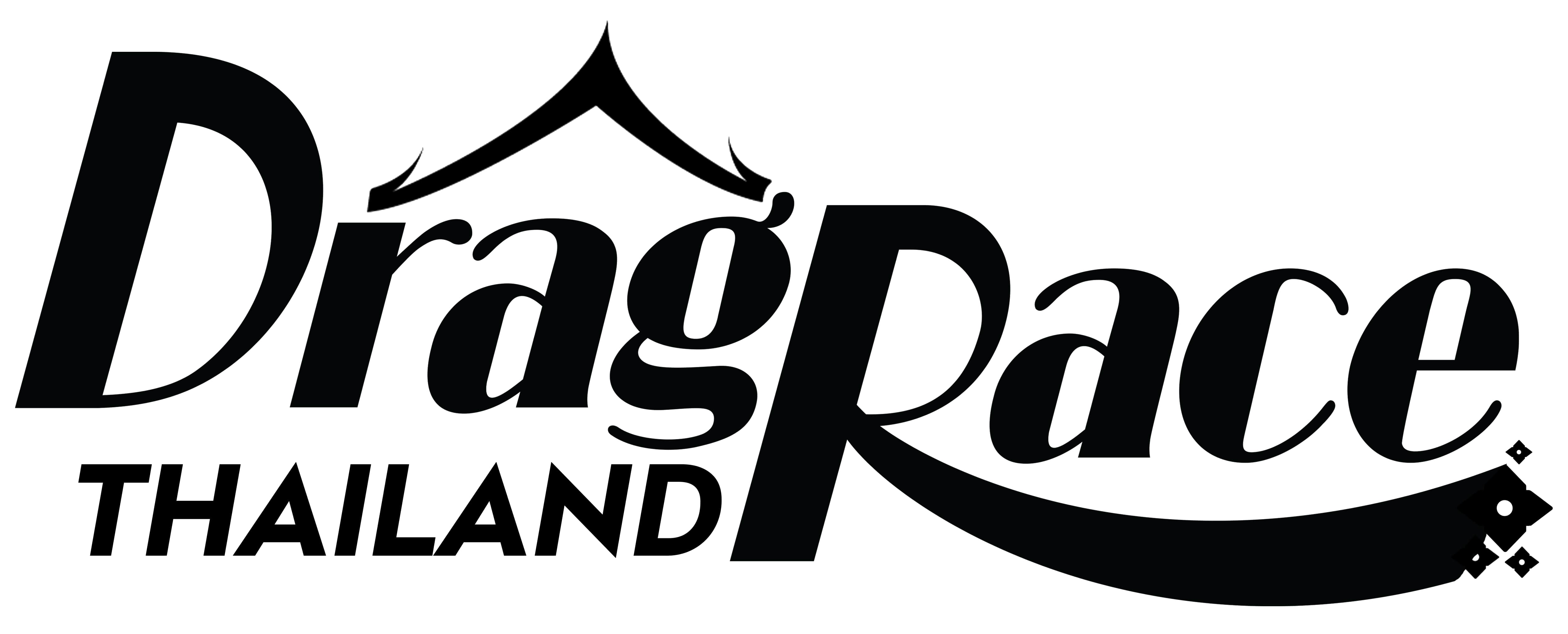
- Thai: แดร็ก เรซ ไทยแลนด์
- Genre: Reality competition
- Based on: RuPaul's Drag Race
- Presented by: Pangina Heals; Art Arya (s. 1-2)
- Judges: Pangina Heals; Art Arya; Gus Setthachai; Metinee Kingpayome; Niti Chaichitathorn
- Ending theme: "Fly Tonight" (season 2); "Rock It (To the Moon)" (season 3)
- Country of origin: Thailand
- Original languages: Thai; English
- No. of seasons: 3
- No. of episodes: 31 (list of episodes)

Production
- Executive producer: Piyarat Kaljaruek
- Camera setup: Multi-camera
- Running time: 55–60 minutes
- Production companies: Katana Group; O4 Media; Fullhouse Asia; World of Wonder

Original release
- Network: Line TV; WOW Presents Plus
- Release: 15 February 2018 – present

Drag Race Thailand is a Thai reality competition television series based on the American series, RuPaul's Drag Race. The series was licensed by the Kantana Group and premiered on 15 February 2018, through streaming service Line TV. Thai drag queen Pangina Heals is the host and head judge of the series. Art Arya was previously a co-host and co-head judge of the series in its first and second seasons.

Natalia Pliacam won the first season in 2018, with Angele Anang winning the second season in 2019. In December 2023, World of Wonder announced the third season's casting.

== Thai drag ==
The host is drag queen Pangina Heals. Pangina Heals spoke about drag as an artform, saying "People are understanding that drag isn’t about sex or gender, but about performance and making other people happy." She also addressed the idea that drag and "ladyboys" are the same thing, saying "Thai people are really accepting of transgender girls, especially with the popularization of the Miss Tiffany's pageant shows."

Pangina Heals is the most famous drag queen in Thailand, dubbed the "RuPaul of Thailand", and was the winner of Thailand's first TV drag competition T-Battle.

== Production ==
=== Format ===
The series takes a distinctively different approach to other international franchises. Most of the challenges reflect on the Thai culture, including mythology, food, and pop culture. In the Thai adaptation, they critiqued the contestants on two challenges. In maxi challenges, the contestants must perform in various challenges for a prize. The winner(s) of the maxi challenge are not exempt from elimination, however, as that is determined by the runway challenge. The runway challenge determines the winner and who will be safe from elimination.

=== Judges ===
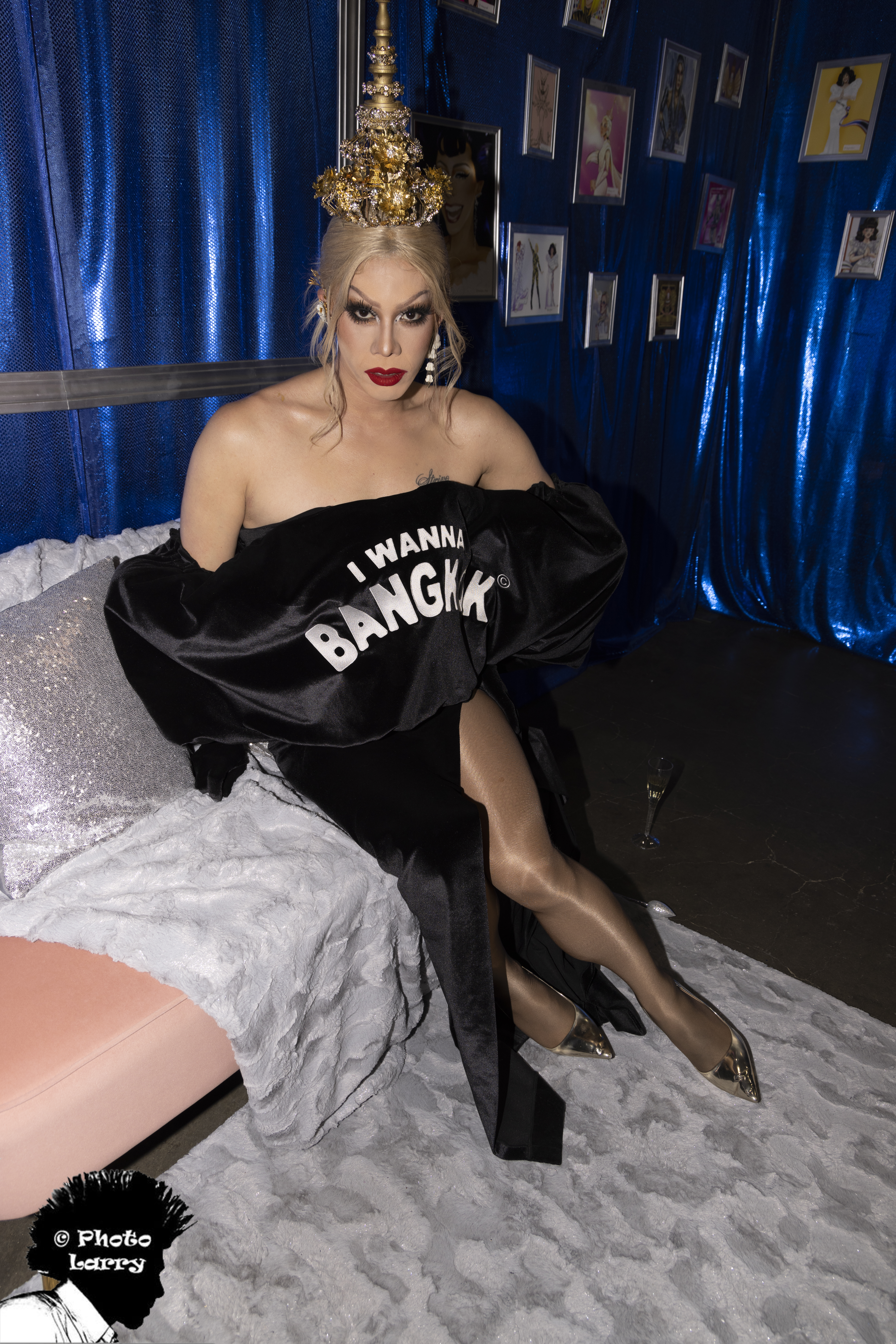
Pangina Heals

The competition series is co-hosted and judged by Thai drag queens, Art Arya and Pangina Heals. After its four-year hiatus, it was confirmed that Pangina Heals would come as host for season three, with Arya returning also as a permanent judge. On October 8, 2024, Pangina Heals announced that Gus Setthachai, Metinee Kingpayome, and Niti Chaichitathorn would be joining the judging panel.

Judges on Drag Race Thailand
Judge	Season		
Judge	1	2	3
Pangina Heals	Main	Main	Main
Art Arya	Main	Main	Main
Gus Setthachai			Main
Metinee Kingpayome			Main
Niti Chaichitathorn			Main

=== Contestants ===
Currently, there has been a total of 24 contestants that competed in Drag Race Thailand.

== Series overview ==
Season	Contestants	Episodes	Originally released		Winner	Runner(s)-up	Miss Congeniality
Season	Contestants	Episodes	First released	Last released	Winner	Runner(s)-up	Miss Congeniality
1	10	8	15 February 2018	5 April 2018	Natalia Pliacam	Année Maywong; Dearis Doll	B Ella
2	14	13	11 January 2019	5 April 2019	Angele Anang	Kana Warrior; Kandy Zyanide	Maya B'Haro
3	11	10	16 October 2024	18 December 2024	Frankie Wonga	Zepee	Benze Diva

=== Season 1 (2018) ===
The first season of Drag Race Thailand premiered on 15 February 2018, on LINE TV. The show was adapted from the American version RuPaul's Drag Race, with references and inclusion of RuPaul's music throughout the show. The winner of the first season was Natalia Pliacam, with B Ella winning Miss Congeniality.

=== Season 2 (2019) ===
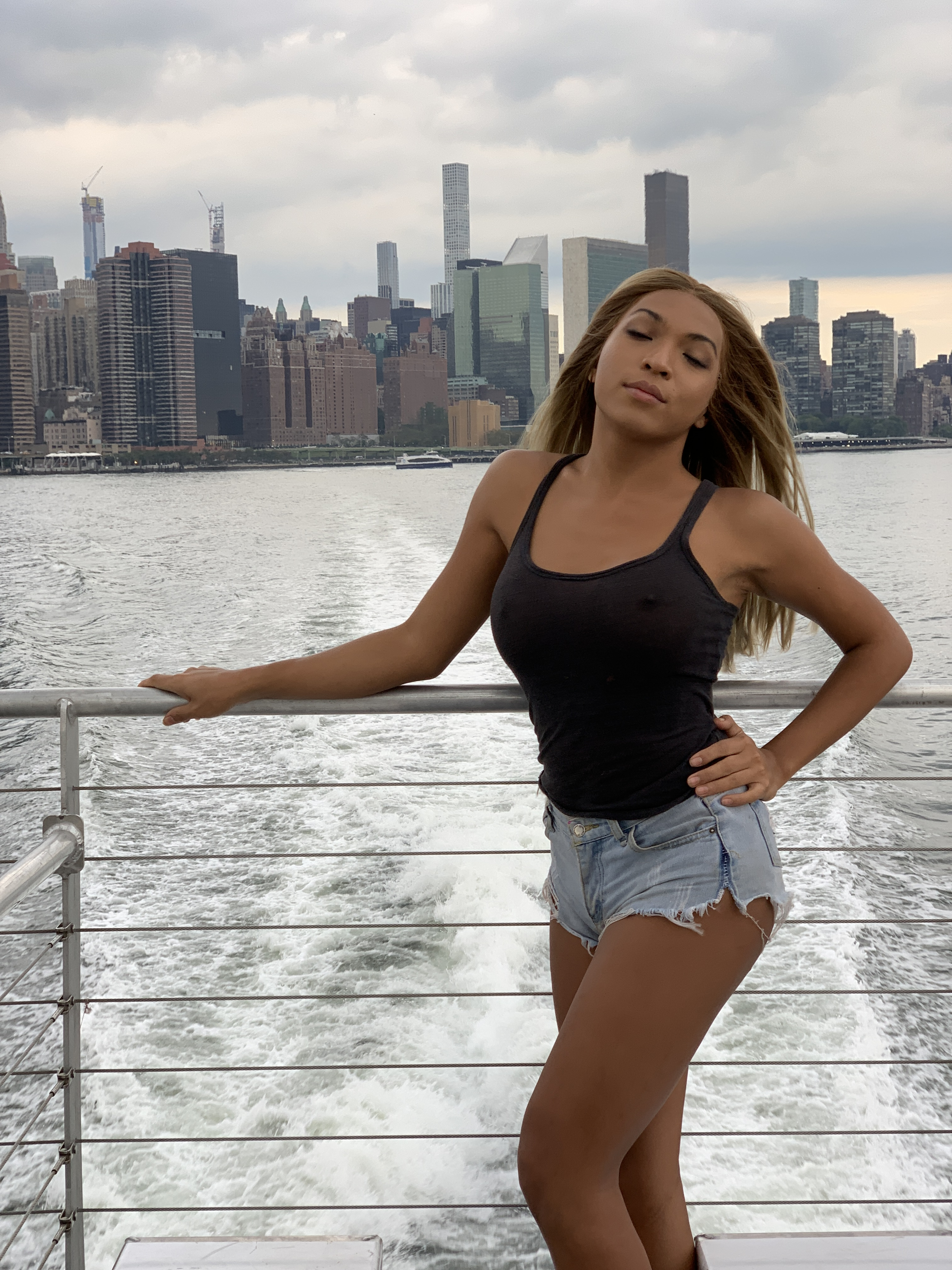
Angele Anang, winner of season 2

A casting announcement for season two was announced on 4 March 2018. A casting commercial was shown on September 13, 2018, and stated any genders were allowed to apply, as well as non-Thai citizens. The show premiered on 11 January 2019. The winner of the second season was Angele Anang, with Maya B'Haro winning Miss Congeniality.

=== Season 3 (2024) ===
In July 2021, Piyarat Kaljaruek of the Kantana Group, announced on social media that the Thai reality series would be returning for a third season, to coincide with the 70th anniversary of the production company. In November 2022, it was revealed that O4 Media acquired the franchise license to produce season three, from the Kantana Group and World of Wonder. A year later, World of Wonder and Fullhouse Asia announced the renewal of the Thai adaptation for season three, with Pangina Heals coming back as host. The winner of the third season is Frankie Wonga, with Benze Diva winning Miss Congeniality.
