= Arizona Brandy =

Filipino drag performer

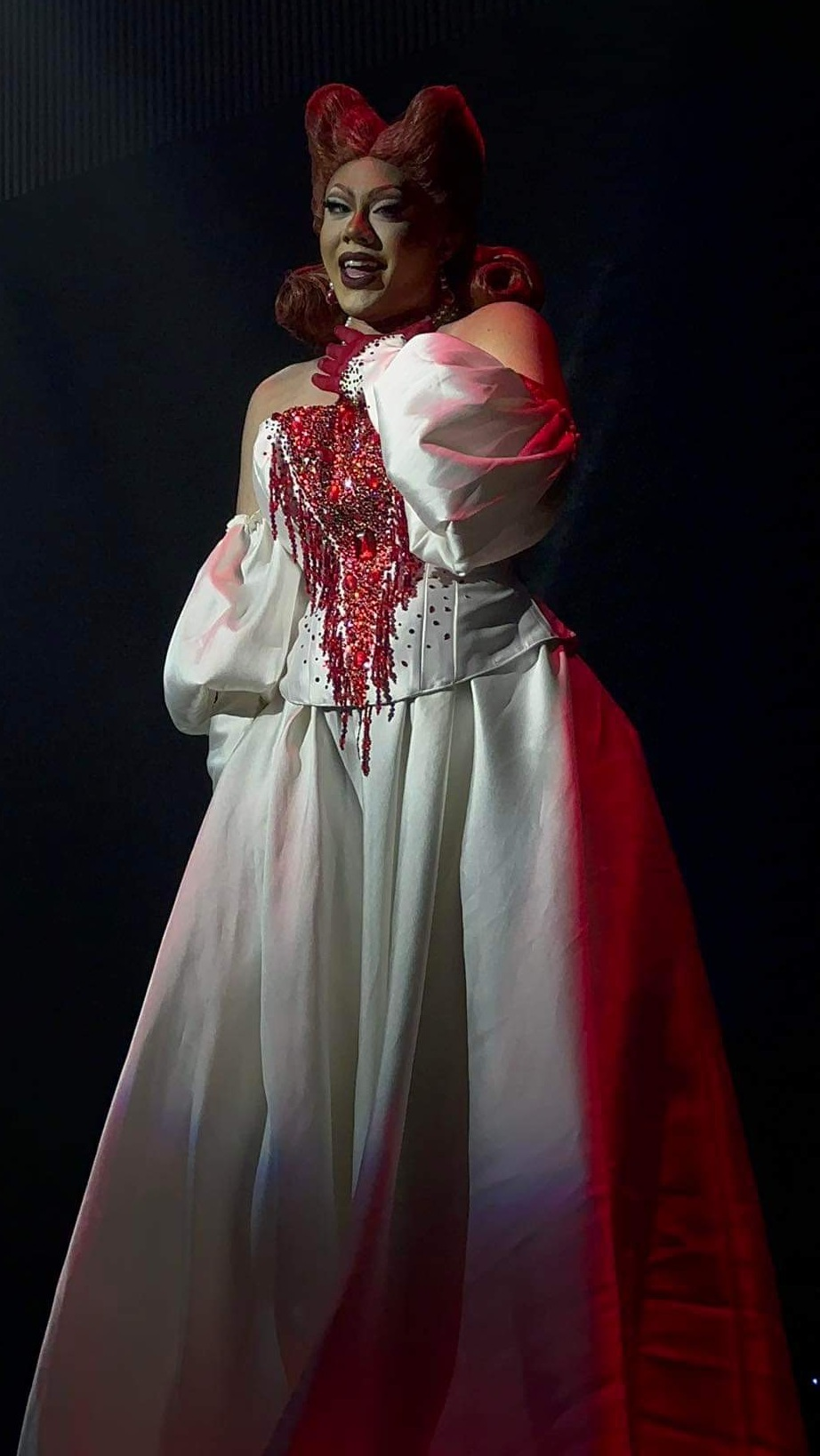
- Arizona Brandy performing in 2023
- Born: Genesis Brillantes Vijandre
- Occupation: Drag queen
- Notable work: Arizona Branded
- Television: Drag Race Philippines (season 2) Drag Race Philippines Slaysian Royale (season 1)

Genesis Brillantes Vijandre known mononymously as Arizona Brandy, is a Filipino drag performer. She is best known for being the runner-up on Season 2 of Drag Race Philippines and one of the top four finalists on Season 1 of Drag Race Philippines: Slaysian Royale.

== Career ==
Arizona Brandy is a drag performer. A seasoned performer in the Cubao drag scene, she represents the Rapture Royalties when she competed on season 2 of Drag Race Philippines. She started the competition strong with a win in the first episode through her performance of the main challenge: writing, recording and performing a verse to "BOOGSH!". She placed in the bottom two of episode 3 in a design challenge. She performed a lip-sync of "Kitty Girl" by RuPaul against Tiny DeLuxe. This lip-sync involved blowing powder on the stage and floor licking. Tiny DeLuxe was eliminated.

On episode 9, she placed in the bottom three alongside Hana Beshie and ØV Cünt. The three performed a lip-sync to "Dati" by Sam Concepcion and Tippy Dos Santos featuring Quest. Her performance resulted to a double elimination of Hana Beshie and ØV Cünt, securing her spot in the final four, with M1ss Jade So, Bernie and Captivating Katkat. In the final episode, she competed with M1ss Jade So for the second round of the lip-sync smackdown, performing "Who Is She?" by RuPaul. Her performance included a wig change, swallowing her contact lenses, and drinking and pouring liquor on herself. She then battled Captivating Katkat for the crown with their rendition of "Kapangyarihan" by iDolls. She placed runner-up in the competition.

Arizona also competed as a drag mother/"Mudra" with her drag child, Jean Vilogue, on the first season of Mudrakels earlier in the year. Her team ranked 5th/6th place after returning and advancing to the finale after getting eliminated in the fourth episode.

== Discography ==
=== Singles ===
List of Singles
Title	Year
"Arizona B"	2025
"Arizona B" (Clean Christmas Version)	2025

"Isaw"

=== Collaborations ===
List of collaborations
Title	Year	Other artist(s)	Album
"Boogsh!" (Pak Girls Version)	2023	Matilduh, Nicole Pardaux, Captivating Katkat, M1ss Jade So, Tiny DeLuxe (The Cast of Drag Race Philippines 2)	Non-album single
"Asian Eyyy!" (P-Nice Version)	2025	Bernie, Brigiding, Khianna, Viñas DeLuxe (The Cast of Drag Race Philippines: Slaysian Royale)	Non-album single
"High Time" (Top 4 Remix)	2025	Captivating Katkat, Marina Summers, Precious Paula Nicole, feat. Brigiding, Suki Doll, Viñas DeLuxe (The Cast of Drag Race Philippines: Slaysian Royale)	REYN4

== Filmography ==
=== Television ===
Year	Title	Network/Platform	Role	Notes
2023	Drag Race Philippines	HBO Go, WOW Presents Plus	Contestant	Season 2, Runner-up (10 episodes)
2023	Drag Race Philippines: Untucked!	HBO Go, WOW Presents Plus	Herself	Season 2 (10 episodes)
2023	Family Feud	GMA Network	Contestant	Ep. 345: Team Four the Love (with Bernie, Captivating Katkat, M1ss Jade So)
2025	Bring Back My Girls	WOW Presents Plus	Herself	Season 4
2025	Drag Race Philippines: Slaysian Royale	WOW Presents Plus	Contestant	Season 1, Finalist (10 episodes)
2025–present	B is for Bonding	YouTube	Host	with Hana Beshie

=== Films ===
Year	Title	Role	Ref.
2025	Ikaw, Kelan?	Miko	
