= Drag Race Philippines: Slaysian Royale =

Philippine reality television series

- Promotional poster for season one
- Genre: Reality competition
- Directed by: Arnel Natividad; Ice Seguerra
- Presented by: Paolo Ballesteros
- Judges: Paolo Ballesteros
- Country of origin: Philippines
- Original languages: English; Filipino / Tagalog
- No. of seasons: 1
- No. of episodes: 10

Production
- Executive producers: Randy Barbato; Fenton Bailey; Tom Campbell; RuPaul Charles; Alex Godinez-Lopez; Yanah Laurel; Jimson Tamano; Maricel Ticar Santos; Gina Godinez
- Camera setup: Multi-camera
- Running time: 55–90 minutes
- Production companies: Fullhouse Asia; World of Wonder

Original release
- Network: WOW Presents Plus
- Release: August 13 – October 15, 2025

Related
- Drag Race Philippines; RuPaul's Drag Race: UK vs. the World; Canada's Drag Race: Canada vs. the World; RuPaul's Drag Race Global All Stars; Drag Race Down Under vs. the World; Drag Race México: Latina Royale

Drag Race Philippines: Slaysian Royale is a spin-off of Drag Race Philippines. The show is based on the "vs. the World" format used within the Drag Race franchise and features former Drag Race Philippines contestants compete with Asian contestants from other franchises. It premiered on WOW Presents Plus on August 13, 2025.

== Production ==
The show is produced in the Philippines by Fullhouse Asia Production Studios, Inc. and World of Wonder, with Fenton Bailey, Randy Barbato, Tom Campbell, RuPaul, Alex Godinez–Lopez and Maricel Ticar Santos as executive producers.

== Contestants ==
Drag Race Philippines: Slaysian Royale contestants and their backgrounds (Note: All ages, names, with hometowns, and outcome are stated at time of filming.)
| Contestant | Age | Hometown | Original season | Original placement | Outcome |
|---|---|---|---|---|---|
| Brigiding | 33 | Mandaluyong, Philippines | Philippines season 1 | 6th place | Winner |
| Viñas DeLuxe | 28 | San Jose del Monte, Philippines | Philippines season 1 | 7th place | Runner-up |
| Arizona Brandy | 28 | Makati, Philippines | Philippines season 2 | Runner-up | 3rd place (Note: Suki Doll was voted Miss Congeniality.) |
| Suki Doll | 31 | Montréal, Canada | Canada season 2 | 9th place (Note: Suki Doll was voted Miss Congeniality by fellow contestants on her original season.) | 3rd place |
| Khianna | 23 | Cagayan de Oro, Philippines | Philippines season 3 | Runner-up | 5th place |
| Yuhua (Note: Yuhua Hamasaki is referred to as Yuhua on the show.) | 35 | New York City, United States | US season 10 | 12th place | 6th place |
| Siam Phusri | 35 | Las Vegas, United States | Thailand season 3 | 7th place | 7th place |
| Bernie (Note: Bernie Barrantes is referred to as Bernie on the show.) | 38 | Mandaluyong, Philippines | Philippines season 2 | 3rd place | 8th place |
| Kitty Space | 29 | Lyon, France | France season 2 | 9th place | 9th place |
| Ivory Glaze | 28 | Sydney, Australia | Down Under season 3 | 9th place | 10th place |
| Sum Ting Wong | 36 | Birmingham, England | UK series 1 | 7th place | 11th place |
| Madame Yoko | 34 | Luxembourg City, Luxembourg | Belgique season 2 | 8th place | 12th place |

== Contestant progress ==
Legend:

Brigiding won Drag Race Philippines: Slaysian Royale.
Viñas DeLuxe was the runner-up.
Suki Doll was voted Miss Congeniality (Miss C) by fellow contestants.
WIN indicates that the contestant won the challenge.
TOP2/TOP3 indicates that the contestant won the challenge, but lost the Lip Sync for Your Legacy.
SAFE indicates that the contestant was declared safe by the judges.
GB indicates that Viñas DeLuxe was given the Golden Balut by the Lip Sync LaLaPaRuZa Slaysian Smackdown winner Brigiding, saving her from the Lip Sync for Your Life.
BTM (Bottom) indicates that the contestant was up for elimination.
ELIM (Eliminated) indicates that the contestant was eliminated.
Guest indicates that the contestant returned as a guest.

Contestants progress with placements in each episode
| Contestant | Episode | | | | | | | | | | |
| Contestant | 1 | 2 | 3 | 4 | 5 | 6 | 7 | 8 | 9 | 10 | |
|---|---|---|---|---|---|---|---|---|---|---|---|
| Brigiding | SAFE | SAFE | SAFE | TOP2 | WIN | TOP3 | WIN | SAFE | WIN | Winner | |
| Viñas DeLuxe | SAFE | WIN | WIN | SAFE | SAFE | TOP3 | GB | BTM | BTM | Runner-up | |
| Arizona Brandy | SAFE | TOP2 | BTM | WIN | BTM | SAFE | TOP3 | WIN | SAFE | Eliminated | |
| Suki Doll | SAFE | SAFE | SAFE | SAFE | TOP2 | SAFE | TOP3 | WIN | BTM | Eliminated | MC |
| Khianna | WIN | SAFE | SAFE | SAFE | SAFE | BTM | BTM | ELIM | | Guest | |
| Yuhua | SAFE | SAFE | SAFE | SAFE | SAFE | WIN | ELIM | | | Guest | |
| Siam Phusri | TOP2 | SAFE | SAFE | SAFE | SAFE | ELIM | | | | Guest | |
| Bernie | SAFE | SAFE | SAFE | BTM | ELIM | | | | | Guest | |
| Kitty Space | SAFE | SAFE | TOP2 | ELIM | | | | | | Guest | |
| Ivory Glaze | SAFE | BTM | ELIM | | | | | | | Guest | |
| Sum Ting Wong | BTM | ELIM | | | | | | | | Guest | |
| Madame Yoko | ELIM | | | | | | | | | Guest | |

== Lip syncs ==
Legend:

The contestant was eliminated after their first time in the bottom.
The contestant was eliminated after their second time in the bottom.
The contestant was eliminated after their third time in the bottom.
The contestant won the first round of the Lip Sync LaLaPaRuZa Slaysian Smackdown and advanced to the second one.
The contestant won the second round of the Lip Sync LaLaPaRuZa Slaysian Smackdown and was declared the winner of the challenge.
The contestant was saved by the winner of the challenge from the bottom.
The contestant won the Lip Sync for the Crown and was declared the winner of the season.

| Episode | Top Slaysians (Elimination) | | | Song | Winner | Bottom | Eliminated |
|---|---|---|---|---|---|---|---|
| 1 | Khianna (Yoko) | vs. | Siam Phusri (Sum Ting) | "Debut" (Katseye) | Khianna | Yoko, Sum Ting | Madame Yoko |
| 2 | Arizona Brandy (Sum Ting) | vs. | Viñas DeLuxe (Sum Ting) | "XL" (Silvy) | Viñas DeLuxe | Ivory, Sum Ting | Sum Ting Wong |
| 3 | Kitty Space (Arizona) | vs. | Viñas DeLuxe (Ivory) | "Winna Winna" (Pangina Heals) | Viñas DeLuxe | Arizona, Ivory | Ivory Glaze |
| 4 | Arizona Brandy (Kitty) | vs. | Brigiding (Kitty) | "Cartoon Heroes" (Aqua) | Arizona Brandy | Bernie, Kitty | Kitty Space |
| 5 | Brigiding (Bernie) | vs. | Suki Doll (Bernie) | "Room" (Stell) | Brigiding | Arizona, Bernie | Bernie |
| 6 | Brigiding (Siam) vs. Viñas DeLuxe (Siam) vs. Yuhua (Siam) | | | "Out of My Head" (Bini) | Yuhua | Khianna, Siam | Siam Phusri |
| Episode | Slaysians | | | Song | Winner | | |
| 7 | Suki Doll | vs. | Yuhua | "Goddess" (Sasha Colby) | Suki Doll | | |
| 7 | Brigiding | vs. | Viñas DeLuxe | "The Queendom (JROB Remix)" (RuPaul) | Brigiding | | |
| 7 | Arizona Brandy | vs. | Khianna | "Boom, Boom, Boom, Boom!!" (Vengaboys) | Arizona Brandy | | |
| 7 | Top Slaysians | | | Song | Winner | Bottom | Saved |
| 7 | Arizona Brandy vs. Brigiding vs. Suki Doll | | | "Queen" (Silvy) | Brigiding | Khianna, Viñas, Yuhua | Viñas DeLuxe |
| 7 | Bottom Slaysians | | | Song | Eliminated | | |
| 7 | Khianna | vs. | Yuhua | "Misbehave" (Lola Amour) | Yuhua | | |
| 8 | Khianna | vs. | Viñas DeLuxe | "Race Car" (Calista) | Khianna | | |
| 9 | Suki Doll | vs. | Viñas DeLuxe | "Power" (Morissette Amon) | None | | |
| Episode | Final Slaysians | | | Song | Winner | | |
| 10 | Brigiding | vs. | Viñas DeLuxe | "Born to Do Drag" (Marina Summers) | Brigiding | | |

== Guest judges ==
Listed in chronological order:

- Jimbo, contestant on Canada's Drag Race season 1, RuPaul's Drag Race: UK vs. the World series 1 and winner of All Stars season 8
- Maxie, contestant on Queen of the Universe season 2 and winner of Drag Race Philippines season 3
- KaladKaren, actress, television personality and Drag Race Philippines judge
- Pangina Heals, host of Drag Race Thailand and contestant on RuPaul's Drag Race: UK vs. the World series 1
- Alyssa Edwards, contestant on RuPaul's Drag Race season 5, All Stars season 2 and winner of Global All Stars season 1
- Captivating Katkat, winner of Drag Race Philippines season 2
- Precious Paula Nicole, winner of Drag Race Philippines season 1
- Sasha Colby, winner of RuPaul's Drag Race season 15
- Marina Summers, contestant on Drag Race Philippines season 1 and RuPaul's Drag Race: UK vs. the World series 2
- Nymphia Wind, winner of RuPaul's Drag Race season 16

=== Special guests ===
Guests who appeared in episodes, but did not judge on the main stage.

Episode 1

- Jon Santos, actor, comedian and Drag Race Philippines judge
- KaladKaren

Episode 2

- Moophs, musician, producer, songwriter and DJ

Episode 4

- Cecile Martinez, choreographer

Episode 5

- Norvina, president of Anastasia Beverly Hills
- Ermie Caoile, an Overseas Filipino Worker
- Christine Salta, an Overseas Filipino Worker
- Angelique Parungao, an Overseas Filipino Worker
- Bevily Davis, an Overseas Filipino Worker

Episode 7

- Lola Amour, rock band

Episode 8

- Seven Barreto, photographer

Episode 9

- KaladKaren
- Seven Barreto
- Precious Paula Nicole
- Captivating Katkat
- Maxie
- Moophs
- Nunoy, choreographer

== Episodes ==
| No. | Title | Original release date |
|---|---|---|
| 1 | "Miss Shutacca: Slaysian Edition" | August 13, 2025 |
Guest Judges: Jimbo and Maxie; Mini-Challenge: Perform in hairography dance-battles; Mini-Challenge Winner: Khianna; Mini-Challenge Prize: A cash tip of ₱20,000 courtesy of Cream Silk; Main Challenge: Present two looks for The Miss Shutacca: Slaysian Edition; Runway Themes: From Roots to Runway and Ruveal Yourself; Top Two: Khianna and Siam Phusri; Lip-Sync Song: "Debut" by Katseye; Lip-Sync for Your Legacy Winner: Khianna; Lip-Sync for Your Legacy Prize: A cash tip of ₱80,000; Bottom Two: Madame Yoko and Sum Ting Wong; Eliminated: Madame Yoko; Farwell Message: "♡ The journey is not finished Shall we keep on going on 2gether? Y͟e͟s͟ Madame Yoko ♡"
| 2 | "Asian Eyyy!" | August 20, 2025 |
Guest Judges: Jimbo and Maxie; Mini-Challenge: Play a traditional game of "Kadang-Kadang"; Mini-Challenge Winner: Khianna; Mini-Challenge Prize: A cash tip of ₱20,000; Main Challenge: Write, record, and perform verses to "Asian Eyyy!"; Runway Theme: Tech Couture; Top Two: Arizona Brandy and Viñas DeLuxe; Lip-Sync Song: "XL" by Silvy; Lip-Sync for Your Legacy Winner: Viñas DeLuxe; Lip-Sync for Your Legacy Prize: A cash tip of ₱80,000 courtesy of Cream Silk; Bottom Two: Ivory Glaze and Sum Ting Wong; Eliminated: Sum Ting Wong; Farwell Message: "No hard feelings only hard cocks. love you long time. Sum Ting Wong ♡"
| 3 | "Holy Cacao!" | August 27, 2025 |
Guest Judges: KaladKaren and Pangina Heals; Mini-Challenge: Play a game of Kep Kep, Boob-ay; Mini-Challenge Winner: Brigiding; Mini-Challenge Prize: A cash tip of ₱20,000; Main Challenge: Create an outfit made out of fossilized cacao leaves; Runway Theme: Holy Cacao!; Top Two: Kitty Space and Viñas DeLuxe; Lip-Sync Song: "Winna Winna" by Pangina Heals; Lip-Sync for Your Legacy Winner: Viñas DeLuxe; Lip-Sync for Your Legacy Prize: A cash tip of ₱80,000 and a year's supply of products courtesy of Auro Chocolate; Bottom Two: Arizona Brandy and Ivory Glaze; Eliminated: Ivory Glaze; Farwell Message: "It's a great Aussie proverb: "Shit happens"
| 4 | "Crazy Bitch Slaysians: The Musical" | September 3, 2025 |
Special Guest: Cecile Martinez; Guest Judges: Jervi Wrightson and Pangina Heals; Mini-Challenge: Drop Balls; Mini-Challenge Winner: Siam Phusri; Mini-Challenge Prize: A cash tip of ₱20,000 courtesy of Bingo Plus; Main Challenge: Crazy Bitch Slaysians: The Rusical; Runway Theme: Happy Face-tival; Top Two: Arizona Brandy and Brigiding; Lip-Sync Song: "Cartoon Heros" by Aqua; Lip-Sync for Your Legacy Winner: Arizona Brandy DeLuxe; Lip-Sync for Your Legacy Prize: A cash tip of ₱80,000; Bottom Two: Bernie and Kitty Space; Eliminated: Kitty Space; Farwell Message: "Continuez de croire en vos rêves Slay accla ♡ Love Kitty"
| 5 | "Homecoming Queens" | September 10, 2025 |
Special Guest: Norvina; Guest Judges: Alyssa Edwards and Captivating Katkat; Mini-Challenge: Gagam-badings; Mini-Challenge Winner: Khianna; Mini-Challenge Prize: A cash tip of ₱20,000; Main Challenge: In pairs, give a drag makeover to female OFWs; Runway Theme: Homecoming Gala Night; Top Two: Brigiding and Suki Doll; Lip-Sync Song: "Room" by Stell; Lip-Sync for Your Legacy Winner: Brigiding DeLuxe; Lip-Sync for Your Legacy Prize: A cash tip of ₱80,000; Bottom Two: Arizona Brandy and Bernie; Eliminated: Bernie; Farwell Message: "I love you all See you bitches"
| 6 | "Snatch Election" | September 17, 2025 |
Guest Judges: Alyssa Edwards and Captivating Katkat; Mini-Challenge: Rate-a-queen; Mini-Challenge Winner: Viñas DeLuxe; Mini-Challenge Prize: A cash tip of ₱20,000; Main Challenge: Snatch Elections; Runway Theme: Asian Mythical Creature Couture; Top Three: Brigiding, Viñas DeLuxe, and Yukua; Lip-Sync Song: "Out of my Head" by BINI; Lip-Sync for Your Legacy Winner: Yuhua DeLuxe; Lip-Sync for Your Legacy Prize: A cash tip of ₱80,000; Bottom Two: Khianna and Siam Phusri; Eliminated: Siam Phursi; Farwell Message: "I Love you all Never say goodbye Phusri on tonight"
| 7 | "Lip Sync Lalaparuza Smackdown" | September 24, 2025 |
Special Guest: Lola Amour; Guest Judges: Precious Paula Nicole and Sasha Colby; Mini-Challenge: Reading the future is fundamental; Mini-Challenge Winner: Suki Doll; Mini-Challenge Prize: A cash tip of ₱20,000; Main Challenge: Lipsync LaLaPaRuZa Smackdown; Lip-Sync Winner: Brigiding; Main Challenge Prize: A cash tip of ₱80,000 courtesy of BingoPlus and the Golden Balut; Bottom Three: Khianna, Viñas DeLuxe, and Yuhua; Golden Balut: Viñas DeLuxe; Lip-sync song: "Misbehave" by Lola Amour; Eliminated: Yuhua; Farwell Message: "Thank you Slaysian Royale for showing me what love is. Stay blessed and keep on loving one another Take care =) ♡" "
| 8 | "Dragcon Slaysia!" | October 1, 2025 |
Special Guest: Seven Barretto; Guest Judges: Alyssa Edwards and Captivating Katkat; Mini-Challenge: Photobombing photoshoot; Mini-Challenge Winner: Khianna; Mini-Challenge Prize: A cash tip of ₱20,000; Main Challenge: Create and design a booth for DragCon Slaysia; Runway Theme: RuBirth; Main Challenge Winners: Arizona Brandy and Suki Doll; Main Challenge Prize: A cash tip of ₱80,000 (Split ₱40,000 each); Bottom Two: Viñas DeLuxe and Khianna; Lip-Sync Song: "Out of my Head" by Calista; Eliminated: Khianna; Farwell Message: "I'm sorry Thanks for believing K for hindi ito Ang KATAPOSAN ♡♡♡ 👁️ IKONIC"; Farewell Message English Translation: "I'm sorry Thanks for believing K for "this Kannot be the end" ♡♡♡ 👁️ IKONIC"
| 9 | "High Time" | October 8, 2025 |
Special Guest: Jervi Wrightson, Moophs, Nunoy Revlon, REYN4, and Seven Barretto; Guest Judges: Marina Summers and Nymphia Wind; Mini-Challenge: Yin and yang photoshoot; Mini-Challenge Winner: Viñas DeLuxe; Mini-Challenge Prize: A cash tip of ₱20,000; Main Challenge: Write verses and star in a music video for REYN4's song "High Time"; Runway Theme: Award Giving Bodi-yodi-yodies; Main Challenge Winner: Brigiding; Main Challenge Prize: A cash tip of ₱80,000; Bottom Two: Suki Doll and Viñas DeLuxe; Lip-Sync Song: "Power" by Morissette Amon; Eliminated: None
| 10 | "Slaysian Grand T.I.T.E! (Totally Impressive Talent Extravaganza!)" | October 15, 2025 |
Guest Judges: Marina Summers and Nymphia Wind; Maxi Challenge: Present three looks at the finale ball, and perform individual show-stopping performances at the Drag Race Philippines Slaysian T.I.T.E.: Totally Impressive Talent Extravaganza; Runway Themes: Defying Gravity; Yellow, Yellow, Yellow!; Come in Your Best Drag; Miss Congee-niality: Suki Doll; Top Two: Brigiding and Viñas DeLuxe; Lip Sync Song: "Born to do Drag" by Marina Summers; Winner of Drag Race Philippines: Slaysian Royale Season 1: Brigiding; Runner-Up: Viñas DeLuxe; Third/Fourth Place: Arizona Brandy and Suki Doll
