= Sum Ting Wong =

Sum Ting Wong, a double entendre for "something wrong", may refer to:

- A gag name used in the Asiana Airlines Flight 214 KTVU prank
- Sum Ting Wong (drag queen), a British drag queen
