= O Bar =

Drag venue in Metro Manila

- Interactive map of O Bar
- Address: Manilla; Philippines
- Coordinates: 14.5860°N 121.0669°E

O Bar is an LGBTQ-friendly bar and drag venue in Metro Manila. Tatler Asia has ranked O Bar among the top safe queer spaces in the Philippines.

== History ==
O Bar opened in Malate on December 15, 2005, and later expanded to Ortigas, Pasig. It has become a popular drag venue, featuring regular drag shows by Filipino performers such as Drag Race Philippines contestants Angel Galang, Bernie, Brigiding, Captivating Katkat, Corazon, John Fedellaga, Marina Summers, Precious Paula Nicole, and Prince, as well as guests such Drag Race Thailand co-host Pangina Heals and RuPaul's Drag Race contestants Adore Delano, Alyssa Edwards, Jiggly Caliente, Laganja Estranja, and Manila Luzon.

The venue has an annual Pride celebration, which has been hosted by KaladKaren. Celeste Cortesi and Bretman Rock have visited O Bar.

== See also ==
- LGBTQ culture in the Philippines
