= RuPaul's Drag Race Live Untucked =

American television series

- Genre: Reality television
- Based on: RuPaul's Drag Race Live!
- Narrated by: RuPaul
- Country of origin: United States
- Original language: English
- No. of seasons: 2
- No. of episodes: 12

Production
- Executive producers: Fenton Bailey; Randy Barbato; Tom Campbell
- Running time: 25 minutes
- Production company: World of Wonder

Original release
- Network: WOW Presents Plus
- Release: April 17, 2024 – present

Related
- RuPaul's Drag Race; RuPaul's Drag Race: Vegas Revue

RuPaul's Drag Race Live Untucked is an American reality streaming television series that premiered on WOW Presents Plus on April 17, 2024. The show follows cast members of the RuPaul's Drag Race Live! variety show in Las Vegas as they prepare for, and after, their performances. The concept is based on RuPaul's Drag Race: Untucked, which is a spin-off of RuPaul's Drag Race and has been adapted by other iterations of the Drag Race franchise. It is the second series based on the RuPaul's Drag Race Live! variety show, following RuPaul's Drag Race: Vegas Revue.

In May 2024, the series was renewed for a second season. It premiered on April 16, 2025.

== Cast ==
The cast for the first season was revealed in October 2023. The cast for the second season was revealed in March 2025.

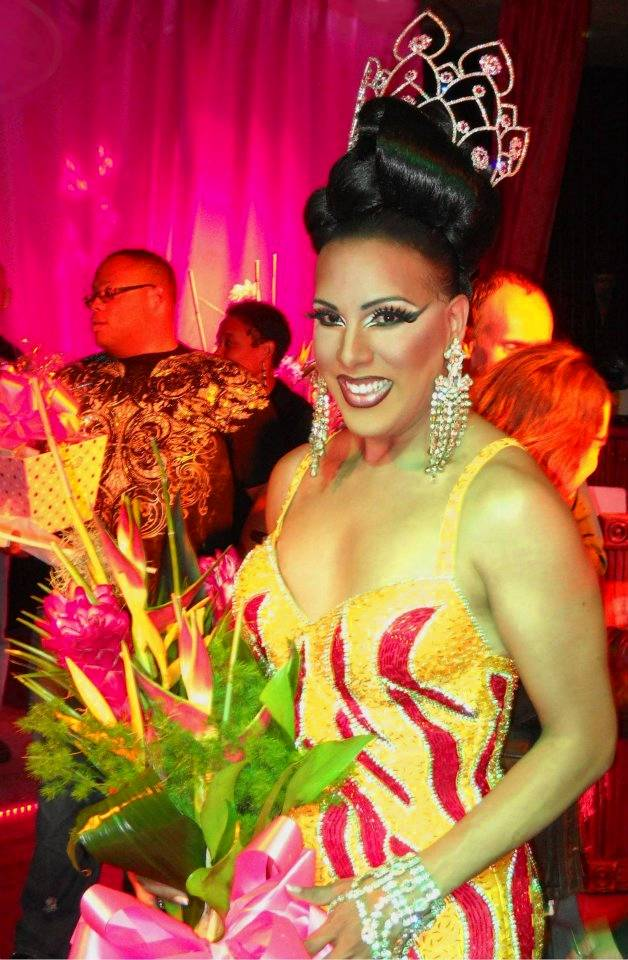
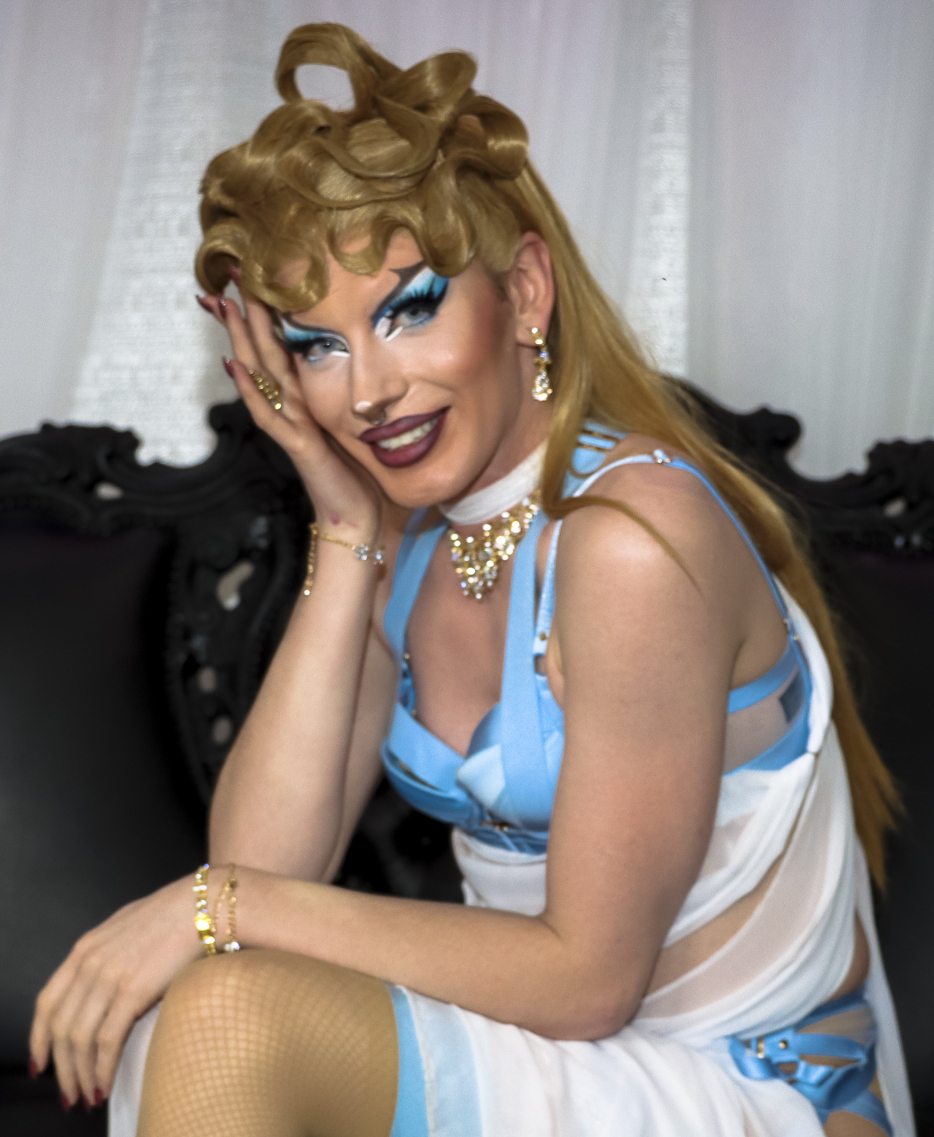
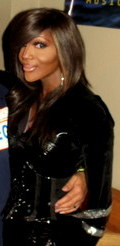
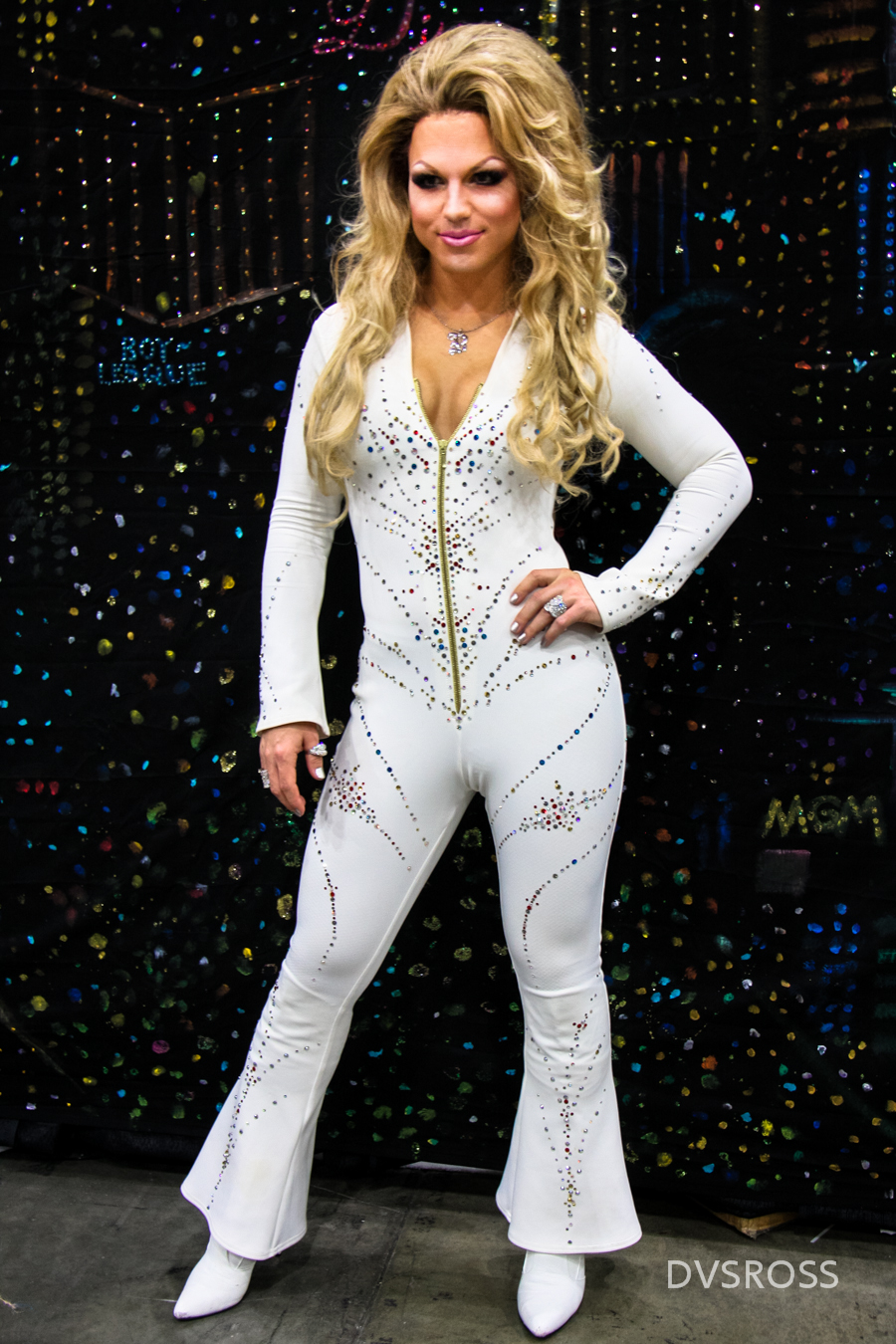
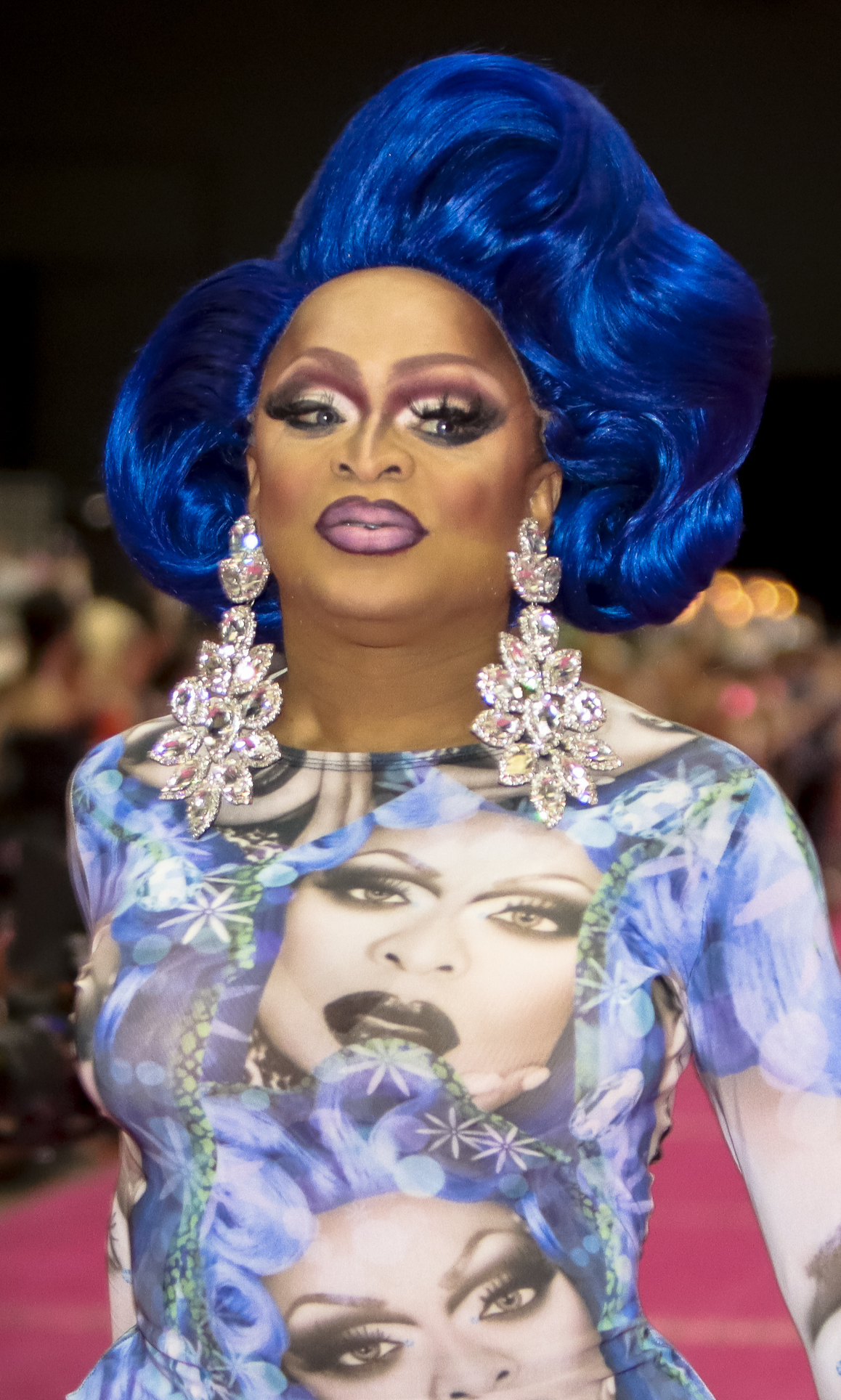
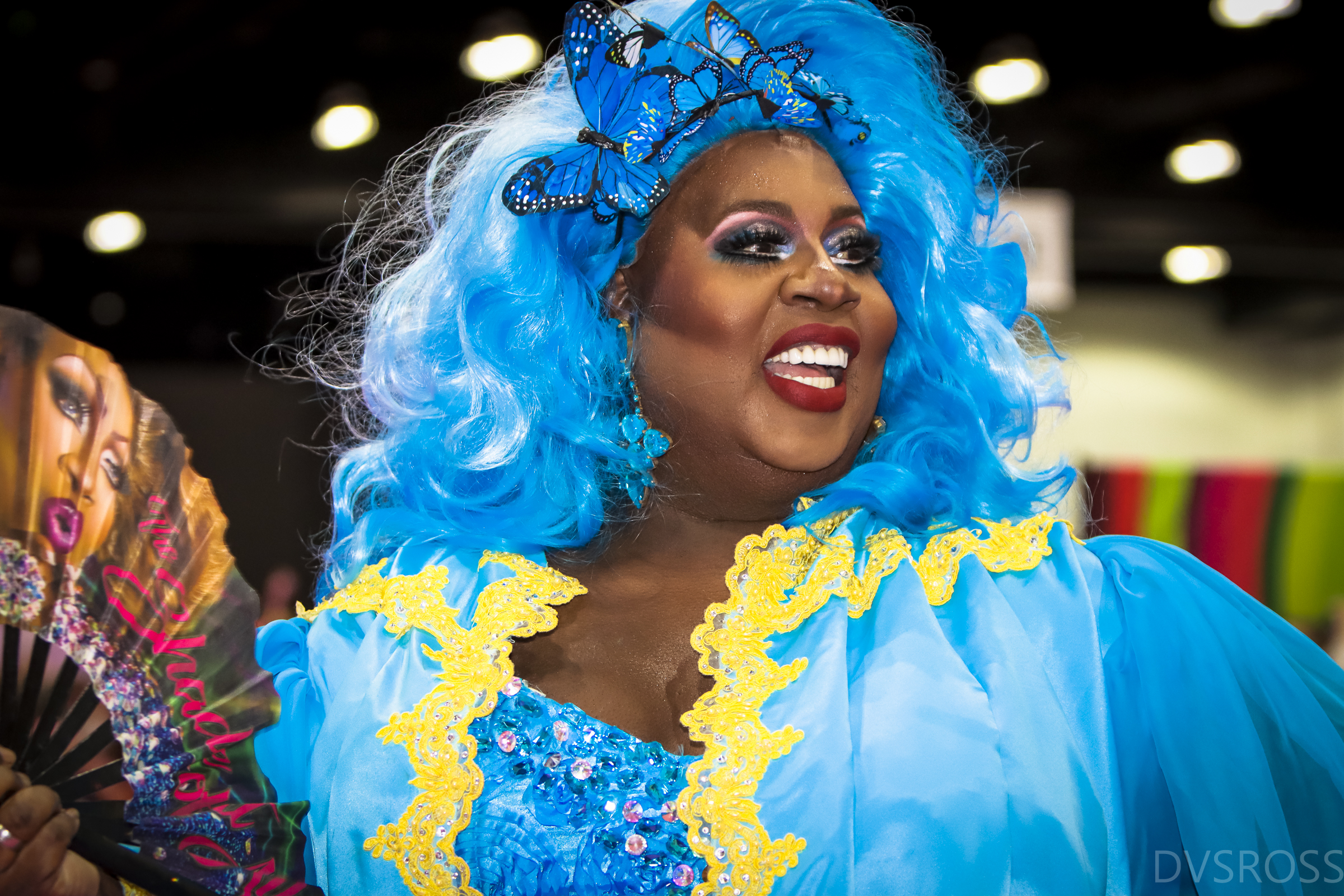
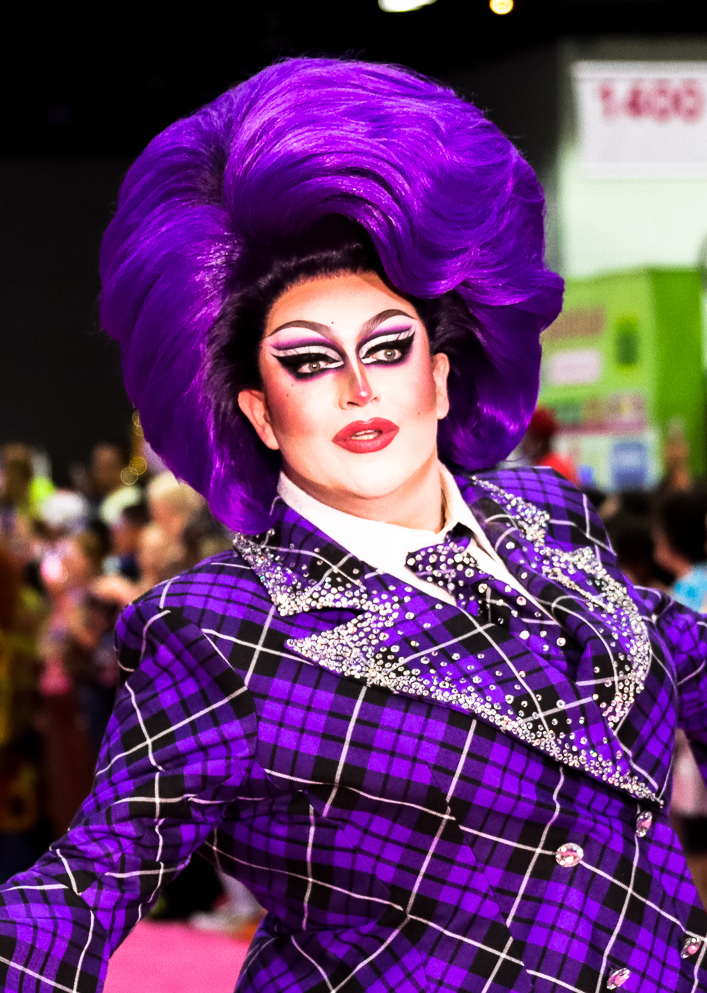
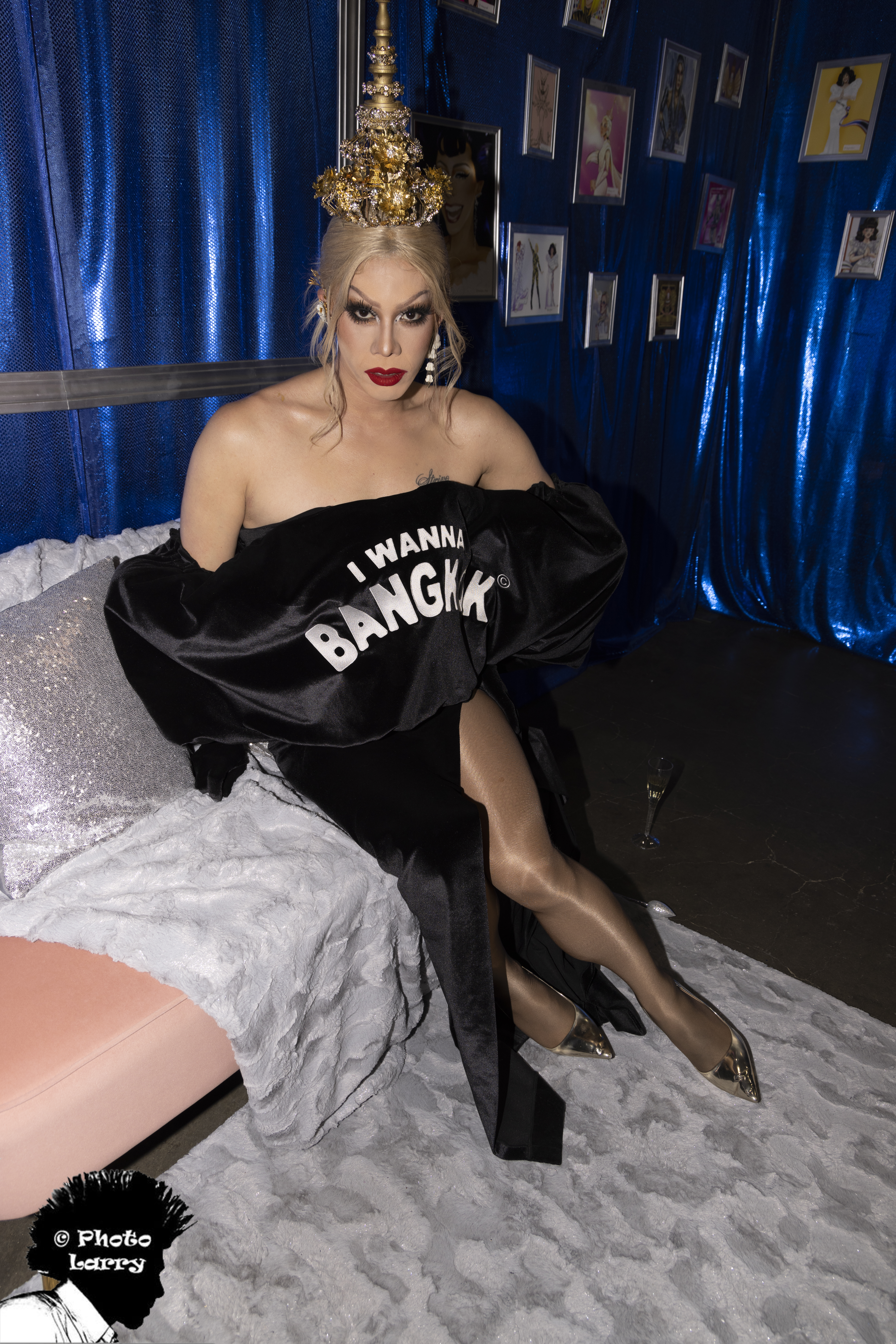
From left to right: Alexis Mateo, Bosco, Coco Montrese, Derrick Barry, Kennedy Davenport, Latrice Royale and Pangina Heals

Performer	Season	
Performer	1	2
Alexis Mateo	Main (Note: In season 1, Alexis Mateo was present in episode 1.)	
Bosco	Main	Main
Coco Montrese	Main	
Derrick Barry	Main	Main
Kennedy Davenport	Main	Main
Latrice Royale	Main	Main
Lawrence Chaney	Main (Note: In season 1, Lawrence Chaney was present in episodes 1–3.)	Main
Pangina Heals	Main	
Mirage		Main (Note: In season 2, Mirage was present in episode 3.)
Nymphia Wind		Main

== Episodes ==
Season	Episodes	Originally released	
Season	Episodes	First released	Last released
1	6	April 17, 2024	May 22, 2024
2	6	April 16, 2025	May 21, 2025

=== Season 1 (2024) ===
No. overall	No. in season	Title	Original release date
1	1	"Welcoming the New Girl"	April 17, 2024
2	2	"Dating a Drag Queen"	April 24, 2024
3	3	"The Girls Have Gone Wild"	May 1, 2024
4	4	"Sweating the House Down Boots"	May 8, 2024
5	5	"The Family Bond"	May 15, 2024
6	6	"The Shade of It All"	May 22, 2024

=== Season 2 (2025) ===
No. overall	No. in season	Title	Original release date
7	1	"New Queen on the Strip"	April 16, 2025
8	2	"Not a Dress Rehearsal"	April 23, 2025
9	3	"Season 16 Sisters"	April 30, 2025
10	4	"When You’re Here You’re Family"	May 7, 2025
11	5	"Hidden Talent"	May 14, 2025
12	6	"The Fly Girls"	May 21, 2025

== Reception ==
The series was the highest-rated WOW Presents Plus original premiere since the platform launched in 2017.
