= Nymphia Wind =

Taiwanese-American drag performer

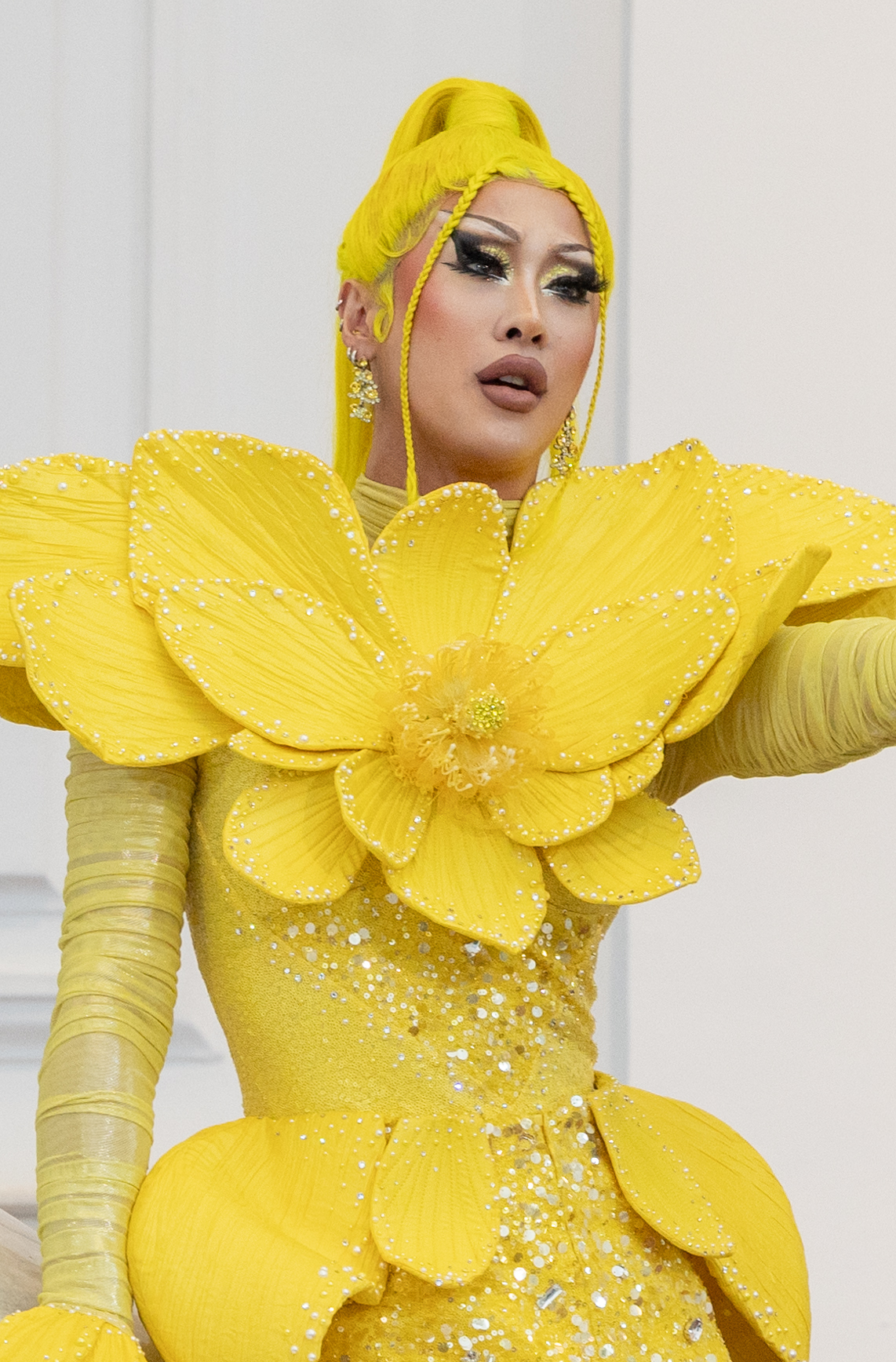
- Nymphia Wind in 2024
- Born: Leo Tsao; July 23, 1995 (age 31); Los Angeles, California, U.S.
- Citizenship: Taiwan; United States
- Education: University for the Creative Arts (BA)
- Occupations: Drag queen; dressmaker
- Years active: 2018–present
- Known for: RuPaul's Drag Race (Season 16) Winner
- Relatives: Ts'ao Yung-ho (granduncle)
- Website: nymphiawind.com

Leo Tsao (Chinese: 曹米駬; born July 23, 1995), known professionally as Nymphia Wind (Chinese: 妮妃雅‧瘋), is a Taiwanese-American drag performer and dressmaker. In 2024, Nymphia Wind was crowned the winner of season 16 of RuPaul's Drag Race, becoming the first East Asian winner of the franchise.

== Early life ==
Leo Tsao was born in Los Angeles and raised in Hong Kong until the age of six when his family moved to Taiwan. Leo was bullied as a child due to gender expression, which led his mother to transfer him to the Holistic Education School. During high school, his interest in fashion was sparked by K-pop girl groups. Then, he developed a passion for drag, practicing dressing up and getting creative with makeup while studying at the university. In 2017, he received a Bachelor of Arts in Fashion Atelier from the University for the Creative Arts in Rochester, England.

== Career ==
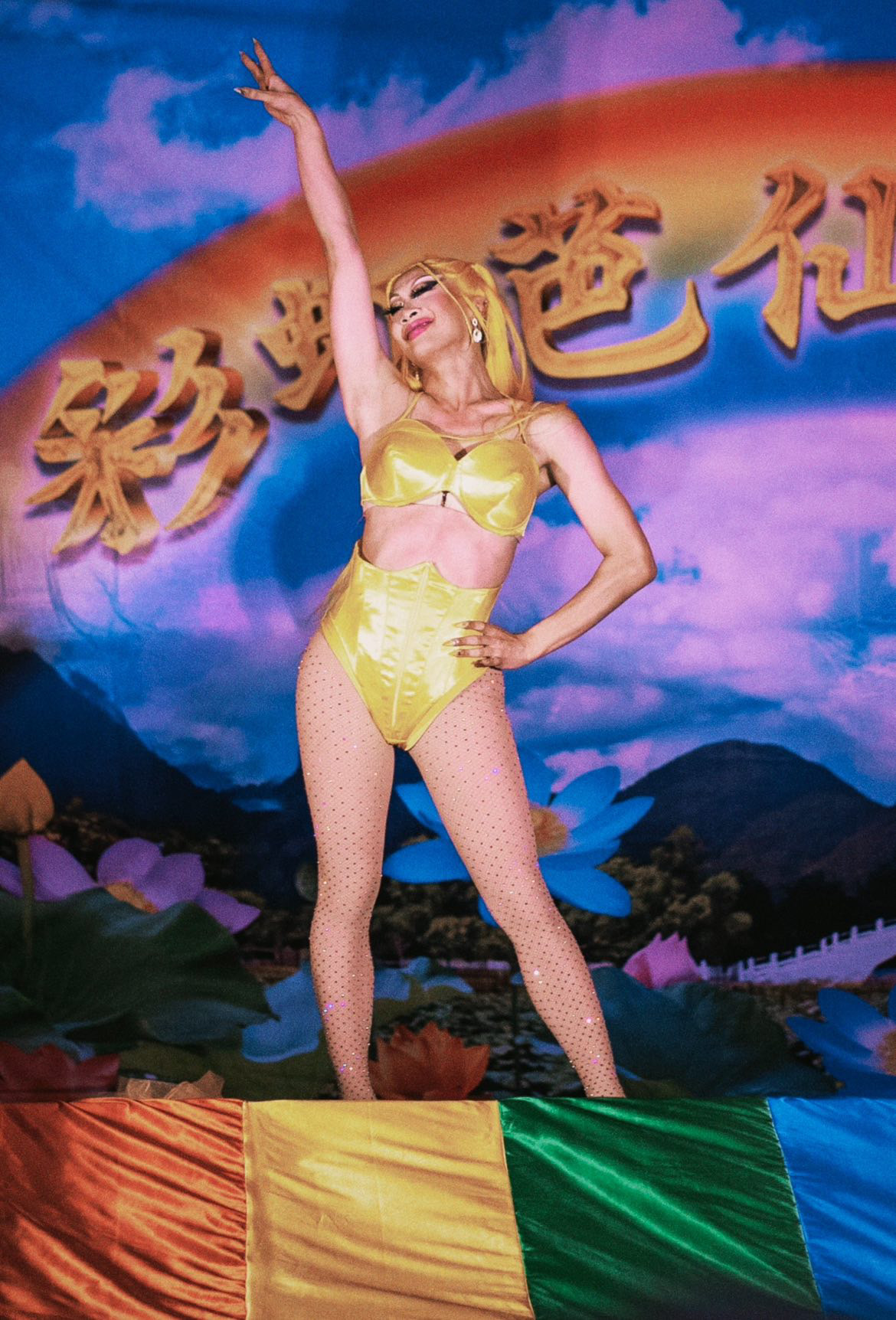
Nymphia Wind performing in 2023

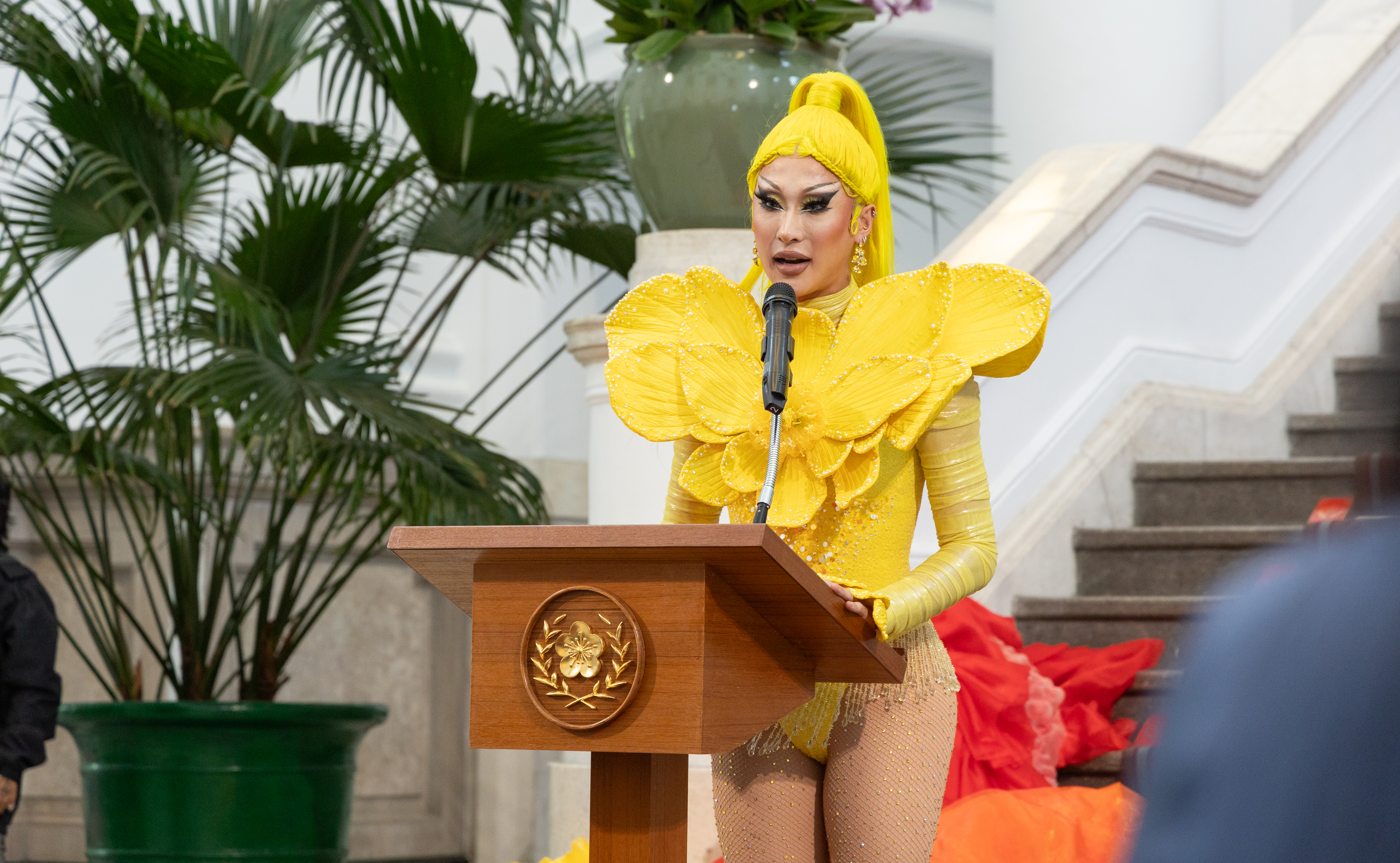
Nymphia Wind in Taiwan Presidential Office in 2024

Since 2018, Nymphia Wind began performing in Taipei. Her first name "Nymphia" comes from the Japanese name of Pokémon character Sylveon (Nymphia), and her last name "Wind" means she likes to be free and invisible, also, "Wind" is a homophone of "craziness" in Mandarin. She is the mother of "House of Wind" (瘋家, use "craziness" in Mandarin). Nymphia Wind's signature color is yellow, as fashion choice and her Asian identity, and her performances often incorporate banana and Taiwanese cultural elements. She calls herself "Banana Buddha" and her fanbase as "Banana Believers". Outside of drag, she is a seamstress.

In 2019, Nymphia Wind won "NYX Face Award 2019 Taiwan". In early 2021, she won "Make a Diva Season 2" in Taiwan. In late 2021, the documentary Leo & Nymphia was completed, which was nominated for the 57th Golden Bell Awards's Best Cinematography and screened at the 2022 Silver Wave Film Festival, the 2023 Thomas Edison Film Festival and the 2023 Queer East Film Festival. Nymphia Wind produced her first show, Bye Bye Nymphia~ Farewell Drag Show, which used a Taiwanese electric flower car as a stage, in June 2022 in Taipei. She is dedicated to combining her Taiwanese cultural significance and aesthetics in her drag performances.

In August 2022, Nymphia Wind moved to Brooklyn to challenge her drag. In early 2023, she won the competition "Mother Season 2" in New York. In 2024, she won the sixteenth season of RuPaul's Drag Race, becoming the first person of East Asian descent to win an installment of the American series, and the second queen of Asian descent to win after Raja Gemini. Her victory also won praise from Taiwan's President Tsai Ing-wen and was invited to perform at Taiwan's presidential office. In May 2024, Nymphia Wind was listed in the arts category on Forbes 30 Under 30 Asia 2024. In August, Nymphia and the House of Wind represented Taiwan performing Formosan Follies at the 2024 Cultural Olympiad in Paris. In October 2024, she was listed on the 2024 Out100 as 100 influential LGBTQ people this year. In December 2024, she was awarded as Harvard Undergraduate Foreign Policy Initiative's inaugural recipient of its Changemaker of the Year award.

== Personal life ==
Leo lives in a supportive family with his mother, who often watches his shows and helps his drag. His granduncle was Ts'ao Yung-ho, a historian who specialized in the history of Taiwan.

== Filmography ==
=== Film ===
Year	Title	Notes	Ref.
2021	Leo & Nymphia	Documentary	
2025	What’s the Vibe in Taiwan?	Documentary	

=== Television ===
Year	Title	Notes	Ref.
2020	Guess Who: My Bestie Mom	Guest	
2024	RuPaul's Drag Race (season 16)	Contestant, Winner	
2024	RuPaul's Drag Race: Untucked	Contestant, Winner	
2024	Da Win Dining	Guest	
2025	RuPaul's Drag Race Live Untucked (season 2)	Guest	
2025	RuPaul's Drag Race (season 17)	Special guest; Episode: "Grande Finale"	
2025	Drag Race Philippines: Slaysian Royale	Judge	

=== Web series ===
Year	Title	Role	Notes	Ref
2020	Jiang Play	Herself	Guest	
2021	Make a Diva 2	Herself	Contestant, Winner	
2021	Youjena Salon	Herself	Guest	
2023	Meet the Queens	Herself	Stand-alone special RuPaul's Drag Race Season 16	
2023	Entertainment Weekly	Herself	Guest	
2024	TaiwanPlus News	Herself	Guest	
2024	Zoom In Zoom Out	Herself	Guest	
2024	Whatcha Packin'	Herself	Guest	
2024	MIB gives drag make over	Herself	Guest	
2024	Newsweek	Herself	Guest	
2024	Good Morning America	Herself	Guest	
2024	Denali ON ICE	Herself	Guest	
2024	Hey Qween!	Herself	Guest	
2024	Bring Back My Girls	Herself	Guest	
2024	Tongue Thai'd	Herself	Guest	

== Discography ==
Year	Title	Album	Ref.
2024	"Power" (with the cast of RuPaul's Drag Race season 16)	Non-album singles	
2024	"Queen of Wind"	Non-album singles	

== Awards and nominations ==
Year	Award giving body	Category	Work	Results	Ref.
2024	Harvard Undergraduate Foreign Policy Initiative	Changemaker of the Year	Herself	Won	

== See also ==
- LGBTQ culture in New York City
- List of LGBTQ people from New York City
- List of Taiwanese Americans
- List of Taiwanese people
- Taiwanese people in New York City

Awards and achievements
Preceded by Sasha Colby	Winner of RuPaul's Drag Race; US season 16	Succeeded by Onya Nurve
