= Tongue Thai'd =

Television series

- Genre: Interview
- Presented by: Pangina Heals
- Country of origin: United States
- Original language: English
- No. of seasons: 3
- No. of episodes: 24

Production
- Executive producers: Fenton Bailey; Randy Barbato; Tom Campbell
- Camera setup: Multi-camera
- Running time: 13–18 minutes
- Production company: World of Wonder

Original release
- Network: WOW Presents Plus
- Release: December 6, 2022 – present

Tongue Thai'd with Pangina Heals is a talk show hosted by Drag Race Thailand co-host and RuPaul's Drag Race: UK vs the World contestant Pangina Heals, produced by World of Wonder. The first season premiered on December 6, 2022, through WOW Presents Plus. A second season was renewed and premiered on December 4, 2023. A third season followed premiering December 3, 2024.

== Production ==
The series' production company announced their late 2022 programming for their streaming service, WOW Presents Plus. Many new series were revealed in a trailer, including Sketchy Queens, Bring Back My Girls, Muff Busters, and Tongue Thai'd. A trailer was released and showcased Pangina Heals presenting the series with many contestants and winners from the Drag Race franchise eating Thai cuisine. The show is filmed in Los Angeles.

=== Format ===
The series format is related to the American interview show, Hot Ones. Every episode of the program features a guest from the Drag Race franchise and is presented by judging panelist Pangina Heals. They both get lunches at a Thai restaurant. Each Thai dish gets progressively hotter as they consume it. They both engage in entertaining challenges or mini-games while eating. After dining, Pangina tells the guest about their total score and the prizes they have won.

== Episodes ==
Season	Episodes	Originally released	
Season	Episodes	First released	Last released
1	8	December 6, 2022	January 24, 2023
2	8	December 4, 2023	January 22, 2024
3	8	December 3, 2024	January 21, 2025

=== Season 1 (2022–23) ===
No. overall	No. in season	Title	Original release date
1	1	"Jujubee at Hoy-Ka Hollywood"	December 6, 2022
The first episode, showcases the host: Pangina Heals eating at the Hoy-Ka Hollywood with guest Jujubee. They both discuss their Asian roots while eating Thai cuisine. While eating, they also discuss their time in RuPaul's Drag Race: UK vs the World. For each Thai plate, the spiciness increases. In between eating Thai cuisine, they also do mini-challenges. Pangina tells Jujubee's score which is a total of 16.7 with a prize of a two-and-a-half-hour supply of House of Love mocktails and an overripe mango.
2	2	"Cheryl Hole at Crispy Pork Gang"	December 13, 2022
In the second episode, Pangina Heals eats at the Crispy Pork Gang with guest Cheryl Hole. They both discuss their midnight snacking and British meanings. For each Thai plate, the spiciness increases. While eating, they also discuss their time on RuPaul's Drag Race: UK vs the World. In between eating Thai cuisine, they also do mini-challenges such as impressions. Pangina tells Cheryl Hole's score which is a total of an A-plus with a prize of a ten-minute supply of House of Love cocktails and a dish of fish and chips.
3	3	"Ongina at Hoy-Ka Hollywood"	December 20, 2022
The third episode premiered, and Pangina Heals is again at the Hoy-Ka Hollywood with guest Ongina. They both discuss their inspiration in drag and their Asian heritage. For each Thai plate, the spiciness increases. Between eating Thai cuisine, they play a mini-game called "Mai or Chai" similar to the game: "Yes or No". Pangina tells Ongina's total score which is 5,259 with a prize of a two-and-a-half-hour supply of House of Love cocktails and a can of French vanilla pudding.
4	4	"Honey Davenport at Luv2Eat Thai"	December 27, 2022
5	5	"Maxi Shield at Crispy Pork Gang"	January 3, 2023
6	6	"Mark Kanemura at Hoy-Ka Hollywood"	January 10, 2023
7	7	"Jimbo at Hoy-Ka Hollywood"	January 17, 2023
8	8	"Kim Chi at Luv2Eat Thai"	January 24, 2023

=== Season 2 (2023–24) ===
No. overall	No. in season	Title	Original release date
9	1	"Jaida Essence Hall at Pailin Thai Cuisine"	December 4, 2023
10	2	"Lady Camden at Hoy-Ka Hollywood"	December 11, 2023
11	3	"Priyanka at Pailin Thai Cuisine"	December 18, 2023
12	4	"Laganja Estranja at Hoy-Ka Hollywood"	December 25, 2023
13	5	"Jared Goldstein at Crispy Pork Gang"	January 1, 2024
14	6	"Raja at Crispy Pork Gang"	January 8, 2024
15	7	"Sasha Colby at Crispy Pork Gang"	January 15, 2024
16	8	"Blu Hydrangea at Crispy Pork Gang"	January 22, 2024

=== Season 3 (2024–25) ===
No. overall	No. in season	Title	Original release date
17	1	"Nymphia Wind at Kruang Tedd"	December 3, 2024
18	2	"Farrah Moan at Siam Sunset"	December 10, 2024
19	3	"Tia Kofi at Bulan"	December 17, 2024
20	4	"Aurora Matrix at Sapp Coffee Shop"	December 24, 2024
21	5	"Derrick Barry at Kruang Tedd"	December 31, 2024
22	6	"M1ss Jade So at Sapp Coffee Shop"	January 7, 2025
23	7	"Viñas Deluxe at Siam Sunset"	January 14, 2025
24	8	"Marina Summers at Bulan"	January 21, 2025
