= Drag Race Philippines season 2 =

2023 season of television series

Drag Race Philippines
- Season 2
- Promotional poster for season two
- Hosted by: Paolo Ballesteros
- Judges: Paolo Ballesteros; KaladKaren; Jiggly Caliente; Rajo Laurel; BJ Pascual; Jon Santos
- No. of contestants: 12
- Winner: Captivating Katkat
- Runner-up: Arizona Brandy
- Miss Congeniality: Hana Beshie
- No. of episodes: 10

Release
- Original network: HBO Go (Philippines); WOW Presents Plus (International)
- Original release: August 2 – October 4, 2023

Season chronology
- ← Previous; Season 1 Next → Season 3

The second season of Drag Race Philippines premiered on 2 August 2023. The season aired on HBO Go in Philippines and WOW Presents Plus internationally. The season was confirmed, alongside Drag Race Philippines: Untucked!, by World of Wonder on 19 October 2022.

The winner of the second of Drag Race Philippines was Captivating Katkat, with Arizona Brandy as the runner-up. Hana Beshie was named Miss Congeniality.

== Production ==
On 6 October 2022, season 1 alternate judge Rajo Laurel teased about a renewal of the show. However, both Discovery+ and HBO Go denied that there was already a season two of Drag Race Philippines in production.

On 19 October 2022, the production company, World of Wonder announced that the show, alongside Drag Race Philippines: Untucked!, have been renewed for a second season.

On 30 October 2022, it was announced via the shows official Instagram page, that casting for the second season was now open. Applications remained open for four weeks until closing on 1 December 2022.

In March 2023, Warner Bros. Discovery Asia-Pacific announced that streaming platform Discovery+ would be discontinued in the Philippines on 27 April 2023, leaving the national broadcasting exclusivity to video-on demand service HBO Go.

On 29 June 2023, World of Wonder, released a promotional post on social media. The post showcases the host, Paolo Ballesteros in a tropical-themed set. On 5 July 2023, alongside Ballesteros, judges KaladKaren and Jiggly Caliente would recur their roles again during season 2. And lastly, on 28 July 2023, photographer BJ Pascual, actor and comedian Jon Santos and fashion designer Rajo Laurel were reconfirmed as alternating judges this season.

Twelve contestants were announced on 11 July 2023.

== Contestants ==
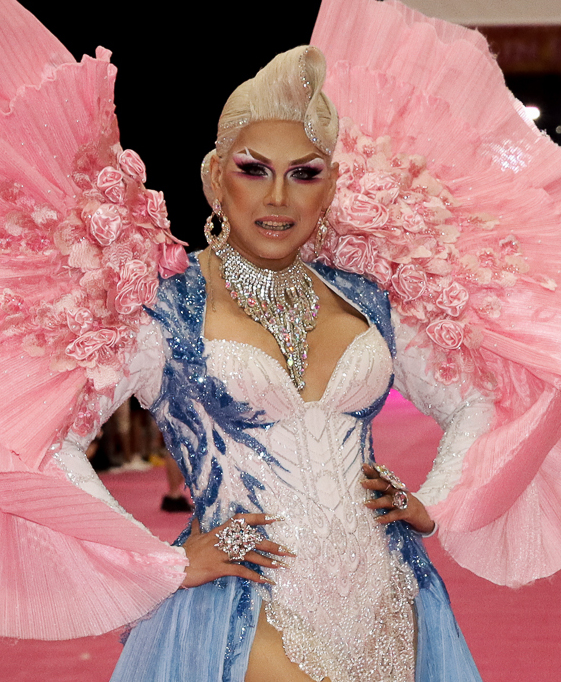
The winner, Captivating Katkat.

Drag Race Philippines season 2 contestants and their backgrounds (Note: All ages, names, with hometowns, and outcome are stated at time of filming.)
Contestant	Age	Hometown	Outcome
Captivating Katkat	42	Santa Maria, Ilocos Sur	Winner
Arizona Brandy	25	Makati, Metro Manila	Runner-up
Bernie (Note: Bernie Barrantes is referred to as Bernie on the show.)	35	Mandaluyong, Metro Manila	3rd place
M1ss Jade So	23	Marikina, Metro Manila	3rd place
Hana Beshie	24	Cagayan de Oro, Misamis Oriental	5th place (Note: Hana Beshie was voted Miss Congeniality.)
ØV Cünt	24	Rosario, Cavite	5th place
DeeDee Marié Holliday	39	Tayabas, Quezon	7th place
Matilduh	24	Vigan, Ilocos Sur	8th place
Veruschka Levels	36	Hong Kong, China	9th place
Tiny DeLuxe	22	Pasig, Metro Manila	10th place
Astrid Mercury	29	Mandaluyong, Metro Manila	11th place
Nicole Pardaux	37	Cebu City, Cebu	11th place

Footnotes

== Contestants progress ==
Legend:

Captivating Katkat won Drag Race Philippines season 2.
Arizona Brandy was the runner-up.
Hana Beshie was voted Miss Congeniality (Miss C) by fellow contestants.
WIN indicates that the contestant won the challenge.
TOP2 indicates that the contestant was one of the two best performing in the challenge, but lost the lip sync to win it.
SAFE indicates that the contestant was declared safe by the judges.
BTM (Bottom) indicates that the contestant was up for elimination.
ELIM (Eliminated) indicates that the contestant was eliminated.
Guest indicates that the contestant returned as a guest.

Contestants progress with placements in each episode
Contestant	Episode									
Contestant	1	2	3	4	5	6	7	8	9	10
Captivating Katkat	SAFE		SAFE	WIN	SAFE	WIN	SAFE	BTM	SAFE	Winner
Arizona Brandy	WIN		BTM	SAFE	SAFE	SAFE	SAFE	SAFE	BTM	Runner-up
Bernie		WIN	SAFE	SAFE	SAFE	SAFE	WIN	BTM	SAFE	Eliminated
M1ss Jade So	SAFE		SAFE	SAFE	BTM	BTM	SAFE	SAFE	WIN	Eliminated
Hana Beshie		BTM	SAFE	SAFE	SAFE	SAFE	SAFE	SAFE	ELIM	Miss C
ØV Cünt		SAFE	SAFE	SAFE	SAFE	SAFE	TOP2	WIN	ELIM	Guest
DeeDee Marié Holliday		SAFE	SAFE	BTM	WIN	ELIM				Guest
Matilduh	SAFE		SAFE	BTM	ELIM					Guest
Veruschka Levels		SAFE	WIN	ELIM						Guest
Tiny DeLuxe	BTM		ELIM							Guest
Astrid Mercury		ELIM								Guest
Nicole Pardaux	ELIM									Guest

== Lip syncs ==
Legend

The contestant was eliminated after their first time in the bottom.
The contestant was eliminated after their second time in the bottom.
The contestant won the lip sync to win the challenge.
The contestant won the first round of the Lip Sync Smackdown for the Crown and advanced to the second.
The contestant won the second round of the Lip Sync Smackdown for the Crown and was declared the winner of the season.

Episode	Contestants			Song	Eliminated
1	Nicole Pardaux	vs.	Tiny DeLuxe	"Here We Go" (4th Impact)	Nicole Pardaux
2	Astrid Mercury	vs.	Hana Beshie	"Unleash the Diva" (4th Impact)	Astrid Mercury
3	Arizona Brandy	vs.	Tiny DeLuxe	"Kitty Girl" (RuPaul)	Tiny DeLuxe
4	DeeDee Marié Holliday vs. Matilduh vs. Veruschka Levels			"Bongga Ka 'Day" (Kim Molina)	Veruschka Levels
5	M1ss Jade So	vs.	Matilduh	"Gusto Ko Nang Bumitaw" (Morissette)	Matilduh
6	DeeDee Marié Holliday	vs.	M1ss Jade So	"I Bring the Beat" (RuPaul)	DeeDee Marié Holliday
Episode	Contestants			Song	Winner
7	Bernie	vs.	ØV Cünt	"A Little Kiss, a Little Hug" (Vernie Varga)	Bernie
Episode	Contestants			Song	Eliminated
8	Bernie	vs.	Captivating Katkat	"The Power" (Ann Raniel)	None
9	Arizona Brandy vs. Hana Beshie vs. ØV Cünt			"Dati" (Sam Concepcion, Tippy Dos Santos ft. Quest)	Hana Beshie
9	Arizona Brandy vs. Hana Beshie vs. ØV Cünt			"Dati" (Sam Concepcion, Tippy Dos Santos ft. Quest)	ØV Cünt
Episode	Contestants			Song	Winner
10	Bernie	vs.	Captivating Katkat	"Just What They Want" (RuPaul)	Captivating Katkat
10	Arizona Brandy	vs.	M1ss Jade So	"Who Is She?" (RuPaul)	Arizona Brandy
10	Arizona Brandy	vs.	Captivating Katkat	"Kapangyarihan" (iDolls)	Captivating Katkat

== Guest judges ==
On July 28, the celebrity guest judges for this season were revealed:

- Almira and Mylene Cercado, singers and members of girl group 4th Impact
- Celina and Irene Cercado, singers and members of girl group 4th Impact
- Tessa Prieto, interior designer and socialite
- Kim Molina, singer and actress
- Anne Curtis, actress
- Maricel Soriano, actress
- Gloria Diaz, actress, model and Miss Universe 1969
- Pangina Heals, co-host of Drag Race Thailand and contestant on RuPaul's Drag Race: UK vs the World
- Bretman Rock, social media personality

=== Special guests ===
Guests who appeared in episodes, but did not judge on the main stage.

Episode 1 and 2:

- Moophs, musician, producer, songwriter and DJ

Episode 5:

- Cecile Martinez, choreographer

Episode 7:

- Norvina, president of Anastasia Beverly Hills

Episode 8:

- Fifth Solomon, actor and director

Episode 9:

- Nunoy Revlon, choreographer and ballroom performer

Episode 10:

- Lady Morgana, contestant and Miss Congeniality on the first season of Drag Race Philippines
- Precious Paula Nicole, winner on the first season of Drag Race Philippines

== Episodes ==
No. overall	No. in season	Title	Original release date
11	1	"Grand Opening Part 1"	August 2, 2023
Six new queens enter the workroom. It is announced that this season will be a split premiere. For the first mini-challenge, the queens do a photoshoot with a tarantula. Matilduh wins the mini-challenge. For the main challenge, the queens write, record, and perform verses to "BOOGSH!" On the runway, category is Feather You Like It or Not. Arizona Brandy, Captivating Katkat and M1ss Jade So receive positive critiques, with Arizona Brandy winning the challenge. Matilduh, Nicole Pardaux and Tiny DeLuxe receive negative critiques, with Matilduh being safe. Nicole Pardaux and Tiny DeLuxe lip-sync to "Here We Go" by 4th Impact. Tiny DeLuxe wins the lip-sync and Nicole Pardaux is the first queen to sashay away.: Guest Judges: Almira and Mylene Cercado; Alternating Judge: BJ Pascual; Mini-Challenge: Photoshoot with a tarantula; Mini-Challenge Winner: Matilduh; Mini-Challenge Prize: A ₱20,000 cash tip; Main Challenge: Write, record, and perform verses to "BOOGSH!"; Runway Theme: Feather You Like It or Not; Challenge Winner: Arizona Brandy; Challenge Prize: A ₱80,000 cash tip; Bottom Two: Nicole Pardaux and Tiny DeLuxe; Lip-Sync Song: "Here We Go" by 4th Impact; Eliminated: Nicole Pardaux; Farewell Message: "Gihigugma ko kamo! Shagit ug kusog! Viva! Nicole ♡" ("I love all of you! Shout out loud! Viva! Nicole ♡")
12	2	"Grand Opening Part 2"	August 9, 2023
The final six queens enter the workroom for the second half of the split premiere. For the mini-challenge, the queens do a photoshoot with a snake. Veruschka Levels wins the mini-challenge. For the main challenge, the queens write, record, and perform verses to "BOOGSH!" On the runway, category is Fringe with Benefits. Bernie, DeeDee Marié Holliday and ØV Cünt receive positive critiques, with Bernie winning the challenge. Astrid Mercury, Hana Beshie and Veruschka Levels receive negative critiques, with Veruschka Levels being safe. Astrid Mercury and Hana Beshie lip-sync to "Unleash the Diva" by 4th Impact. Hana Beshie wins the lip-sync and Astrid Mercury is the second queen to sashay away.: Guest Judges: Celina and Irene Cercado; Alternating Judge: BJ Pascual; Mini-Challenge: Photoshoot with a snake; Mini-Challenge Winner: Veruschka Levels; Mini-Challenge Prize: A ₱20,000 cash tip; Main Challenge: Write, record, and perform verses to "BOOGSH!"; Runway Theme: Fringe with Benefits; Challenge Winner: Bernie; Challenge Prize: A ₱80,000 cash tip; Bottom Two: Astrid Mercury and Hana Beshie; Lip-Sync Song: "Unleash the Diva" by 4th Impact; Eliminated: Astrid Mercury; Farewell Message: "To my Season 2 queens, I LOVE YOU ALL!!! Slay the competition - ASTRID MERCURY 💋"
13	3	"Who Wore It Bettah?"	August 16, 2023
For this week's mini-challenge, the queens pair up and play the Lolapalooza Newspaper Dance. Matilduh wins the mini-challenge. For the main challenge, the queens create a look with the same party supplies as your drag sister.: Birthday - Arizona Brandy vs. Veruschka Levels; Christmas - Bernie vs. M1ss Jade So; Fiesta - Hana Beshie vs. Tiny DeLuxe; Halloween - Matilduh vs. ØV Cünt; Valentine's Day - Captivating Katkat vs. DeeDee Marié Holliday; On the runway, category is Who Wore It Bettah?. DeeDee Marié Holliday, Hana Beshie, M1ss Jade So, Matilduh and Veruschka Levels receive positive critiques, with Veruschka Levels winning the challenge. Arizona Brandy, Captivating Katkat and Tiny DeLuxe receive negative critiques, with Captivating Katkat being safe. Arizona Brandy and Tiny DeLuxe lip-sync to "Kitty Girl" by RuPaul. Arizona Brandy wins the lip-sync and Tiny DeLuxe sashays away.: Guest Judge: Tessa Prieto; Alternating Judges: Jon Santos and Rajo Laurel; Mini-Challenge: In pairs, play the "Lolapalooza Newspaper Dance"; Mini-Challenge Winner: Matilduh; Mini-Challenge Prize: A ₱20,000 cash tip; Main Challenge: Create a look with the same party supplies as your drag sister; Runway Theme: Who Wore It Bettah?; Challenge Winner: Veruschka Levels; Challenge Prize: A ₱80,000 cash tip; Bottom Two: Arizona Brandy and Tiny DeLuxe; Lip-Sync Song: "Kitty Girl" by RuPaul; Eliminated: Tiny DeLuxe; Farewell Message: "Girlssss I ♡ U all so much! Tangina RUGIRLS! Love you EXTRA LARGE - TINY DELUXE"
14	4	"Snatch Game" "Snatch Game KNB?"	August 23, 2023
For this week's mini-challenge, the queens perform a tinikling dance routine. Matilduh wins the mini-challenge. For the main challenge, the queens play the Snatch Game. Jon Santos and Kim Molina star as the celebrity contestants. The cast consisted of: Arizona Brandy as Adele; Bernie as Madam Inutz; Captivating Katkat as Joy Belmonte; DeeDee Marié Holliday as Meryl Streep and Jennifer Coolidge; Hana Beshie as Jessica Soho; M1ss Jade So as Queen Dura; Matilduh as Sassa Gurl; ØV Cünt as Zenaida Seva; Veruschka Levels as Dionisia Dapidran-Pacquiao; On the runway, category is Uuh-La-Lam Realness. Arizona Brandy, Captivating Katkat and ØV Cünt receive positive critiques with Captivating Katkat winning the challenge. DeeDee Marié Holliday, Matilduh and Veruschka Levels receive negative critiques and are announced as the bottom three. They lip-sync to "Bongga Ka 'Day" by Kim Molina. DeeDee Marié Holliday and Matilduh win the lip-sync and Veruschka Levels sashays away.: Guest Judge: Kim Molina; Alternating Judge: Jon Santos; Mini-Challenge: Perform a tinikling routine; Mini-Challenge Winner: Matilduh; Mini-Challenge Prize: A ₱20,000 cash tip; Main Challenge: Snatch Game; Runway Theme: Uuh-La-Lam Realness; Challenge Winner: Captivating Katkat; Challenge Prize: A ₱80,000 cash tip; Bottom Three: DeeDee Marié Holliday, Matilduh and Veruschka Levels; Lip-Sync Song: "Bongga Ka 'Day" by Kim Molina; Eliminated: Veruschka Levels; Farewell Message: "SIS! I'm going away with a BIG SMILE & so much LOVE for u all LOVE VERUSCHKA LEVELS"
15	5	"Sirena: The Rusical"	August 30, 2023
For this week's mini-challenge, the queens play a game of musical chairs. Captivating Katkat wins the mini-challenge. For the main challenge, the queens perform in Sirena: The Rusical.: Arizona Brandy plays Pia; Bernie plays Tampalpuke; Captivating Katkat plays Sirena; DeeDee Marié Holliday plays Tiya Pusit; Hana Beshie plays Queen Tritona; M1ss Jade So plays Princess Erica; Matilduh plays Catriona; ØV Cünt plays Labastyan; On the runway, category is The Shoooes! Bernie, Captivating Katkat, DeeDee Marié Holliday and ØV Cünt receive positive critiques with DeeDee Marié Holliday winning the challenge. M1ss Jade So and Matilduh receive negative critiques, and are announced as the bottom two. They lip-sync to "Gusto Ko Nang Bumitaw" by Morrissette. M1ss Jade So wins the lip-sync and Matilduh sashays away.: Guest Judge: Anne Curtis; Alternating Judge: Jon Santos; Mini-Challenge: Play a game of musical chairs; Mini-Challenge Winner: Captivating Katkat; Mini-Challenge Prize: A ₱20,000 cash tip; Main Challenge: Sirena: The Rusical; Runway Theme: The Shoooes!; Challenge Winner: DeeDee Marié Holliday; Challenge Prize: A ₱80,000 cash tip; Bottom Two: M1ss Jade So and Matilduh; Lip-Sync Song: "Gusto Ko Nang Bumitaw" by Morrissette; Eliminated: Matilduh; Farewell Message: "I'm glad na nakilala ko kayo. Don't let others outshine you. Love you girls! ╭ᑎ╮Duh 💋" ("I'm glad to have met all of you. Don't let others outshine you. Love you girls! ╭ᑎ╮Duh 💋")
16	6	"Dramarama Mama!"	September 6, 2023
For this week's mini-challenge, the queens have a bitchfest with puppets. Hana Beshie wins the mini-challenge. For the main challenge, the queens overact in "Pangako Sa'Yo, Mula sa Puso... Magkaribal sa Dulo ng Walang Hanggan ng Kadenang Ginto... The Second Installment!" (A Promise to You, From the Heart... Rivals 'til the End of Eternity's Golden Chains... The Second Installment!): Arizona Brandy plays Madame Eva Le Quickie; Bernie plays Marla; Captivating Katkat plays Barda; DeeDee Marié Holliday plays Charing; Hana Beshie plays Susan Pabrika; M1ss Jade So plays Carla; ØV Cünt plays Sister Marites; On the runway, category is Can I Get an Alien? Bernie, Captivating Katkat and Hana Beshie receive positive critiques, with Captivating Katkat winning the challenge. Arizona Brandy, DeeDee Marié Holliday and M1ss Jade So receive negative critiques, with Arizona Brandy being safe. DeeDee Marié Holliday and M1ss Jade So lip-sync to "I Bring the Beat" by RuPaul. M1ss Jade So wins the lip-sync and DeeDee Marié Holliday sashays away.: Guest Judge: Maricel Soriano; Alternating Judge: Jon Santos; Mini-Challenge: Everybody Loves Puppets; Mini-Challenge Winner: Hana Beshie; Mini-Challenge Prize: A ₱20,000 cash tip; Main Challenge: Overact in "Pangako Sa'Yo, Mula sa Puso... Magkaribal sa Dulo ng Walang Hanggan ng Kadenang Ginto... The Second Installment!" (A Promise to You, From the Heart... Rivals 'til the End of Eternity's Golden Chains... The Second Installment!); Runway Theme: Can I Get an Alien?; Challenge Winner: Captivating Katkat; Challenge Prize: A ₱80,000 cash tip; Bottom Two: DeeDee Marié Holliday and M1ss Jade So; Lip-Sync Song: "I Bring the Beat" by RuPaul; Eliminated: DeeDee Marié Holliday; Farewell Message: "To my Sisters and new daughters, You are all superstars. Let's conquer the world and build a sisterhood of a lifetime. xoxo DeeDee Marié Holliday"
17	7	"Twinning: The Shequel"	September 13, 2023
For this week's mini-challenge, the queens apply makeup using only one compact mirror and pose for a photoshoot. Bernie wins the mini-challenge. For the main challenge, the queens makeover members of the Golden Gays. On the runway, category is Twinning: The Shequel. Arizona Brandy, Bernie, Captivating Katkat, Hana Beshie, M1ss Jade So and ØV Cünt receive positive critiques. It is then announced that Bernie and ØV Cünt are the top two queens of the week and will lip-sync for the win. They lip-sync to "A Little Kiss, a Little Hug" by Vernie Varga. After the lip-sync, Bernie is announced as the winner of the challenge. Paolo Ballesteros then announces that no one will be going home.: Guest Judge: Gloria Diaz; Alternating Judge: Rajo Laurel; Mini-Challenge: Apply makeup using only one compact mirror and pose for a photoshoot; Mini-Challenge Winner: Bernie; Mini-Challenge Prize: A ₱20,000 cash tip; Main Challenge: Makeover members of the Golden Gays; Runway Theme: Twinning: The Shequel; Top Two: Bernie and ØV Cünt; Lip-Sync Song: "A Little Kiss, a Little Hug" by Vernie Varga; Challenge Winner: Bernie; Challenge Prize: A ₱80,000 cash tip
18	8	"Branding-Ding-Ding!"	September 20, 2023
For this week's mini-challenge, the queens read the other queens through a rap. Arizona Brandy wins the mini-challenge. For the main challenge, the queens create, market, and film a commercial for your own shampoo. On the runway, category is Rainbow Runway Realness. Arizona Brandy, Hana Beshie, M1ss Jade So and ØV Cünt receive positive critiques, with ØV Cünt winning the challenge. Even though M1ss Jade So was given positive critiques, she received a low placement as punishment for using more than the allocated time to film her commercial. Bernie and Captivating Katkat receive negative critiques, and are announced as the bottom two. They lip-sync to "The Power" by Ann Raniel. Both queens win the lip-sync and no one goes home.: Guest Judge: Pangina Heals; Alternating Judge: BJ Pascual; Mini-Challenge: Read the other queens through a rap; Mini-Challenge Winner: Arizona Brandy; Mini-Challenge Prize: A ₱20,000 cash tip courtesy of Havaianas; Main Challenge: Create, market, and film a commercial for your own shampoo; Runway Theme: Rainbow Runway Realness; Challenge Winner: ØV Cünt; Challenge Prize: A ₱80,000 cash tip; Bottom Two: Bernie and Captivating Katkat; Lip-Sync Song: "The Power" by Ann Raniel; Eliminated: None
19	9	"The Main Event"	September 27, 2023
For this week's main challenge, the queens star and perform in a music video for RuPaul's song "Main Event". On the runway, category is Doble-Kara Extravaganza (Two-Face Extravaganza). Bernie, Captivating Katkat and M1ss Jade So receive positive critiques, with M1ss Jade So winning the challenge. Arizona Brandy, Hana Beshie and ØV Cünt receive negative critiques, and are announced as the bottom three. They lip-sync to "Dati" by Sam Concepcion and Tippy Dos Santos ft. Quest. Arizona Brandy wins the lip-sync and Hana Beshie and ØV Cünt both sashay away.: Guest Judge: Bretman Rock; Alternating Judge: Jon Santos; Main Challenge: Star and perform in a music video for RuPaul's song "Main Event"; Runway Theme: Doble-Kara Extravaganza (Two-Face Extravaganza); Challenge Winner: M1ss Jade So; Challenge Prize: A ₱80,000 cash tip; Bottom Three: Arizona Brandy, Hana Beshie and ØV Cünt; Lip-Sync Song: "Dati" by Sam Concepcion and Tippy Dos Santos ft. Quest; Eliminated: Hana Beshie and ØV Cünt; Hana Beshie's Farwell Message: "'Edi bye! PS: Iwan niyo kami ng remembrance - Hana Beshie" ("Goodbye, then! PS: Leave a parting gift for both of us - Hana Beshie"); ØV Cünt's Farewell Message: "👁️ ØV CÜNT"
20	10	"Grand Finale - Philippines Season 2"	October 4, 2023
For the final challenge of the season, the queens walk the runway one last time in the categories Wildlife Couture Extravaganza, My Precious Stones Fantasy and Your Best Drag Eleganza. The eliminated queens all return to the runway, where it is announced that Hana Beshie is this season's Miss Congeniality. Paolo then announces that the final four queens will take part in a Lip-Sync Smackdown for the Crown. The first lip-sync is between Bernie and Captivating Katkat. They lip-sync to "Just What They Want" by RuPaul. Captivating Katkat wins the lip-sync and Bernie is eliminated. The second lip-sync is between Arizona Brandy and M1ss Jade So. They lip-sync to "Who Is She?" by RuPaul. Arizona Brandy wins the lip-sync and M1ss Jade So is eliminated. The final lip-sync is between Arizona Brandy and Captivating Katkat. They lip-sync to "Kapangyarihan" by iDolls. It is announced that Captivating Katkat is the winner, leaving Arizona Brandy as the runner-up.: Alternating Judges: BJ Pascual, Jon Santos and Rajo Laurel; Runway Themes: Wildlife Couture Extravaganza, My Precious Stones Fantasy and Your Best Drag Eleganza; Final Four: Arizona Brandy, Bernie, Captivating Katkat and M1ss Jade So; Miss Congeniality: Hana Beshie; Lip-Sync Smackdown #1: Bernie vs. Captivating Katkat; Lip-Sync Song: "Just What They Want" by RuPaul; Eliminated: Bernie; Lip-Sync Smackdown #2: Arizona Brandy vs. M1ss Jade So; Lip-Sync Song: "Who Is She?" by RuPaul; Eliminated: M1ss Jade So; Lip-Sync Smackdown #3: Arizona Brandy vs. Captivating Katkat; Lip-Sync Song: "Kapangyarihan" by iDolls; Runner-up: Arizona Brandy; Winner of Drag Race Philippines Season Two: Captivating Katkat
