= Bernie (drag queen) =

Filipino drag performer

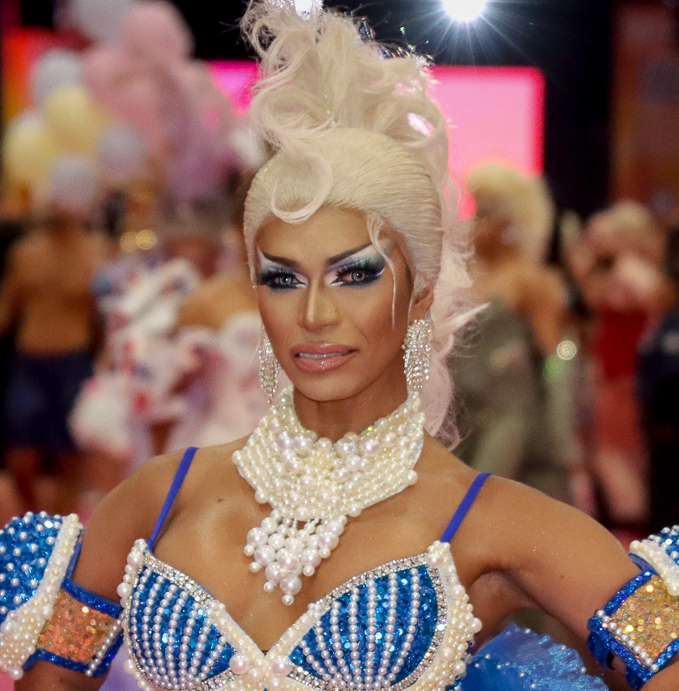
- Bernie at RuPaul's DragCon LA, 2024
- Born: Bernie Barrantes
- Other name: Bernie Diday
- Occupation: Drag queen
- Television: Drag Race Philippines (season 2)

Bernie Barrantes (also known as Bernie Diday, or simply Bernie) is a Filipino drag performer who competed on season 2 of Drag Race Philippines and season 1 of Drag Race Philippines: Slaysian Royale.

== Career ==
Bernie has been a drag performer for more than fifteen years, and has been described as "one of the most esteemed and established" queens in Manila. She is a regular performer at O Bar.

Bernie competed on season 2 of Drag Race Philippines. She was one of the first three transgender contestants on the series, alongside Captivating Katkat and M1ss Jade So. Bernie won two challenges, including the girl group challenge. She impersonated Madam Inutz for the Snatch Game challenge. Bernie and Captivating Katkat placed in the bottom two of the branding challenge, but both were saved from elimination after an emotional lip sync to "The Power" by Ann Raniel in which both embraced their gender identity. Bernie placed in the top four and was eliminated from the competition by Captivating Katkat in a lip sync to RuPaul's "Just What They Want".

== Personal life ==
Bernie is a trans woman. She was previously legally blind in one eye until an online fundraiser granted her the ability to undergo surgery in 2023.

== Filmography ==
=== Film ===
- I'm an Electric Lampshade (2023), as Bernie the Drag Queen
- Warla (2025), as Heart Sayson

=== Television ===
- Drag Race Philippines (season 2, 2023)
- Drag Race Philippines: Untucked! (2023)
- Bring Back My Girls (2025)
- Drag Race Philippines: Slaysian Royale (2025)

== Discography ==
=== Singles ===
Year	Song Title	Composer	Record Label
2025	Diday	Dale Toloza	Manic Records

=== Collaborations ===
List of collaborations
Title	Year	Other artist(s)	Album
"BOOGSH!" (Vlyungangühveoux Version)	2023	Astrid Mercury, DeeDee Marié Holliday, Hana Beshie, ØV_Cünt, Veruschka Levels (The Cast of Drag Race Philippines season 2)	Non-album single
"Asian Eyyy!" (P-Nice Version)	2025	Arizona Brandy, Brigiding, Khianna, Viñas DeLuxe (The Cast of Drag Race Philippines: Slaysian Royale)	Non-album single
