= Captivating Katkat =

Filipina drag performer

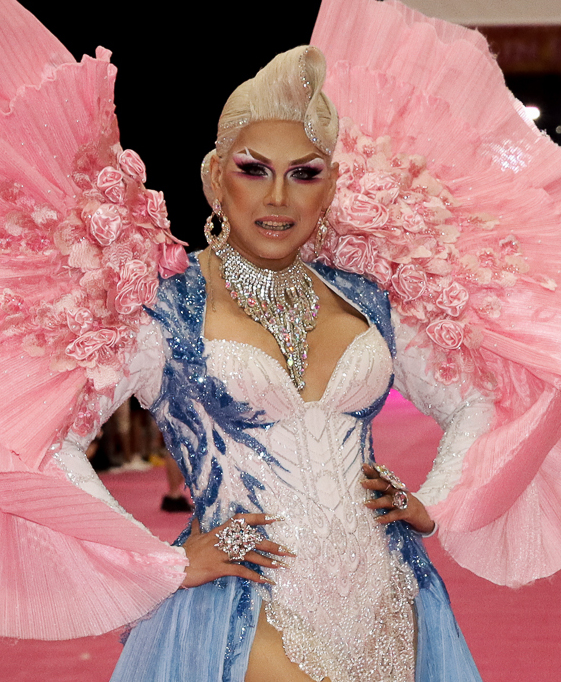
- Katkat at RuPaul's DragCon LA, 2024
- Other names: Katkat Dasalla
- Occupation: Drag queen
- Years active: 2000 - present
- Television: Drag Race Philippines (season 2)

Captivating Katkat is the stage name of Katkat Dasalla, a Filipina drag performer and winner of season 2 of Drag Race Philippines.

== Career ==
Captivating Katkat is a drag performer who has worked at O Bar in Pasig, as well as The One 690 Entertainment Bar in Manila. The Manila Bulletin has called her a "seasoned" drag performer, and Nylon Manila has described her as "one of the most prominent" drag queens in the Philippines.

Captivating Katkat was the winner of season 2 of Drag Race Philippines. She was one of the first three trans women to compete on the show, along with Bernie and M1ss Jade So. Captivating Katkat won two challenges, including the Snatch Game challenge (in which she impersonated politician Joy Belmonte) and the acting challenge. She placed in the bottom two of the branding challenge, which saw contestants create shampoo commercials. She lip-synced against Bernie to "The Power" by Ann Raniel, but both were saved from elimination. Captivating Katkat was a top four finalist, before winning.

== Personal life ==
Dasalla is a trans woman.

== Filmography ==
- Drag Race Philippines
- Bring Back My Girls (2025)
- Drag Race Philippines: Slaysian Royale (2025), guest judge
