= BingoPlus =

Philippine-based online gambling platform

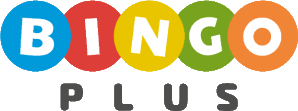
- Type: Online gambling
- Launched: January 2022
- Operating systems: IOS, Android
- Members: 40 million users (2024)
- Availability: Philippines
- Website: bingoplus.ph

BingoPlus is a Philippine online gambling platform known for its live-streamed bingo games. It was launched in 2022 by a subsidiary of DigiPlus, AB Leisure Exponent Inc. and features a wide selection of online gambling games, such as traditional bingo.

== History ==
Taking advantage of the COVID-19 pandemic, the Leisure and Resorts World Corporation (LRWC; known as DigiPlus since February 2023.) through its subsidiary AB Leisure Exponent Inc. (ABLE) launched Bingo Plus in January 2022 allowing potential players to play livestreamed bingo. The company was granted an Online Traditional Bingo (OTB) license from state-run gambling regulator Philippine Amusement and Gaming Corporation (PAGCOR) within the same year.

It replaced Bingo Bonanza, which was an electronic bingo hall chain often is housed inside shopping malls.

In 2024, BingoPlus' registered users rose to 40 million doubling the figures from last year, benefitting from the Philippine government's crackdown on overseas-catering casinos or Philippine offshore gaming operators.

On September 29, 2024, BingoPlus introduced a perya game called Pinoy Drop Ball with DigiPlus billing the game as the first live drop ball game of its type launched in the Philippines

== Games ==
The BingoPlus platform provides online bingo, as well as other games such as baccarat, tong-its and perya (fair) games.

== Locations ==
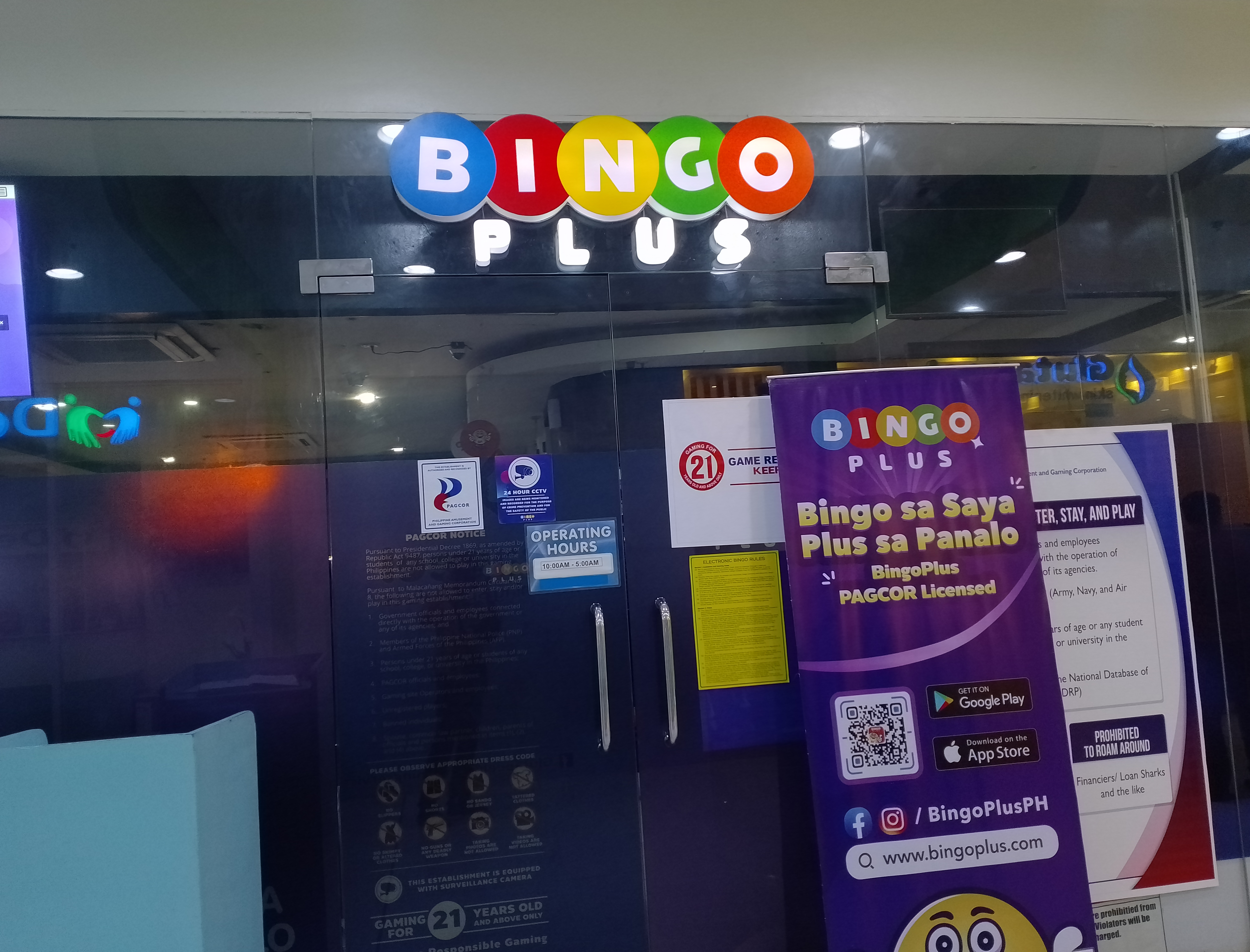
Bingo Plus at Parkmall in Mandaue, Cebu.

BingoPlus' online gambling operations are supported by physical outlets across the Philippines. As of 2024, it has around 134 physical branches.

== Marketing ==
=== Brand ambassadors ===
BingoPlus has used celebrities as brand ambassadors, the first of which was Luis Manzano. This was followed by Maine Mendoza, Piolo Pascual, and Kim Chiu.

=== Sponsorships ===
BingoPlus is a sponsor of the Philippine Basketball Association (PBA) entering their first deal in August 2022. The deal covered 2022–23 and the 2023–24 seasons.

In October 2022, BingoPlus entered into a sponsorship deal with the Premier Volleyball League (PVL). The gambling platform became the women's volleyball league's official gaming partner.

It has sponsored the MassKara Festival of Bacolod in 2022, 2023, and 2024.

In 2025, the International Series Golf tournament, hosted by BingoPlus, is scheduled to be held in the Philippines for the first time.

== Legal actions ==
In June 2024, a player and three employees at the BingoPlus SM City Cauayan branch were alleged to have conspired to manipulate the results of the Bingo Milyonaryo game, illegally winning a jackpot of approximately ₱3.96 million (US$80,406.09). A fraud case was filed, and the individuals involved were arrested.

== See also ==
- Online bingo
- Gambling in the Philippines
- Bingo in the Philippines
