= Sum Ting Wong (drag queen) =

British drag performer

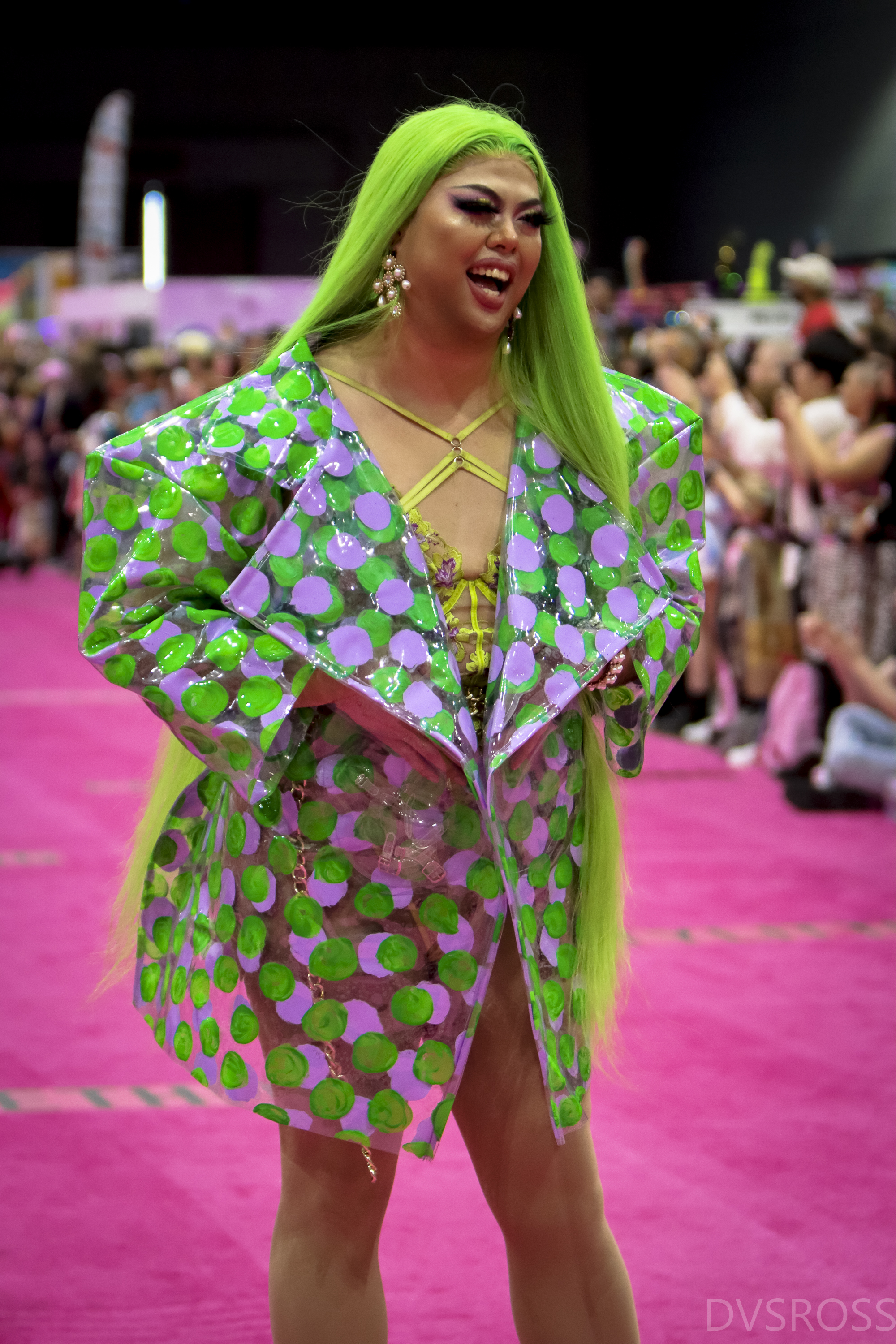
- Sum Ting Wong at RuPaul's DragCon LA, 2022
- Born: Bo Zeng; Birmingham, England, U.K.
- Occupation: Drag queen
- Television: RuPaul's Drag Race UK (series 1); Drag Race Philippines: Slaysian Royale
- Website: Official website (archived)

Sum Ting Wong is the stage name of Bo Zeng, a drag queen from Birmingham, England. She is best known for her appearances on the first series of RuPaul's Drag Race UK and the first season of Drag Race Philippines: Slaysian Royale.

== Early life ==
Bo Zeng was born in Birmingham to Vietnamese immigrant parents of Chinese descent.

== Career ==
Sum Ting Wong's name comes from an incident in 2013, when KTVU in San Francisco aired stereotypical Chinese-sounding gag names of the Asiana Airlines Flight 214 pilots including "Sum Ting Wong" (something wrong), "Wi Tu Lo" (we [are] too low), "Ho Lee Fuk" (holy fuck), and "Bang Ding Ow" (onomatopoeias of sounds made when crash landing). Wong has said she chose to reappropriate the name for herself to reflect her British Vietnamese heritage. She competed on the first series of RuPaul's Drag Race UK.

Outside of Drag Race, she is a Twitch streamer and musician.

== Discography ==
=== Singles ===
- Crossfire (2019)
- Hypnotise (2021)
- This Isn't Love (2023)
- U N I (You & I) (2023)
- Ex (Friends) (2024)

== Filmography ==
- RuPaul's Drag Race UK (series 1)
- Bring Back My Girls (2022)
- Drag Race Philippines: Slaysian Royale (2025)
