= M1ss Jade So =

Filipina drag performer

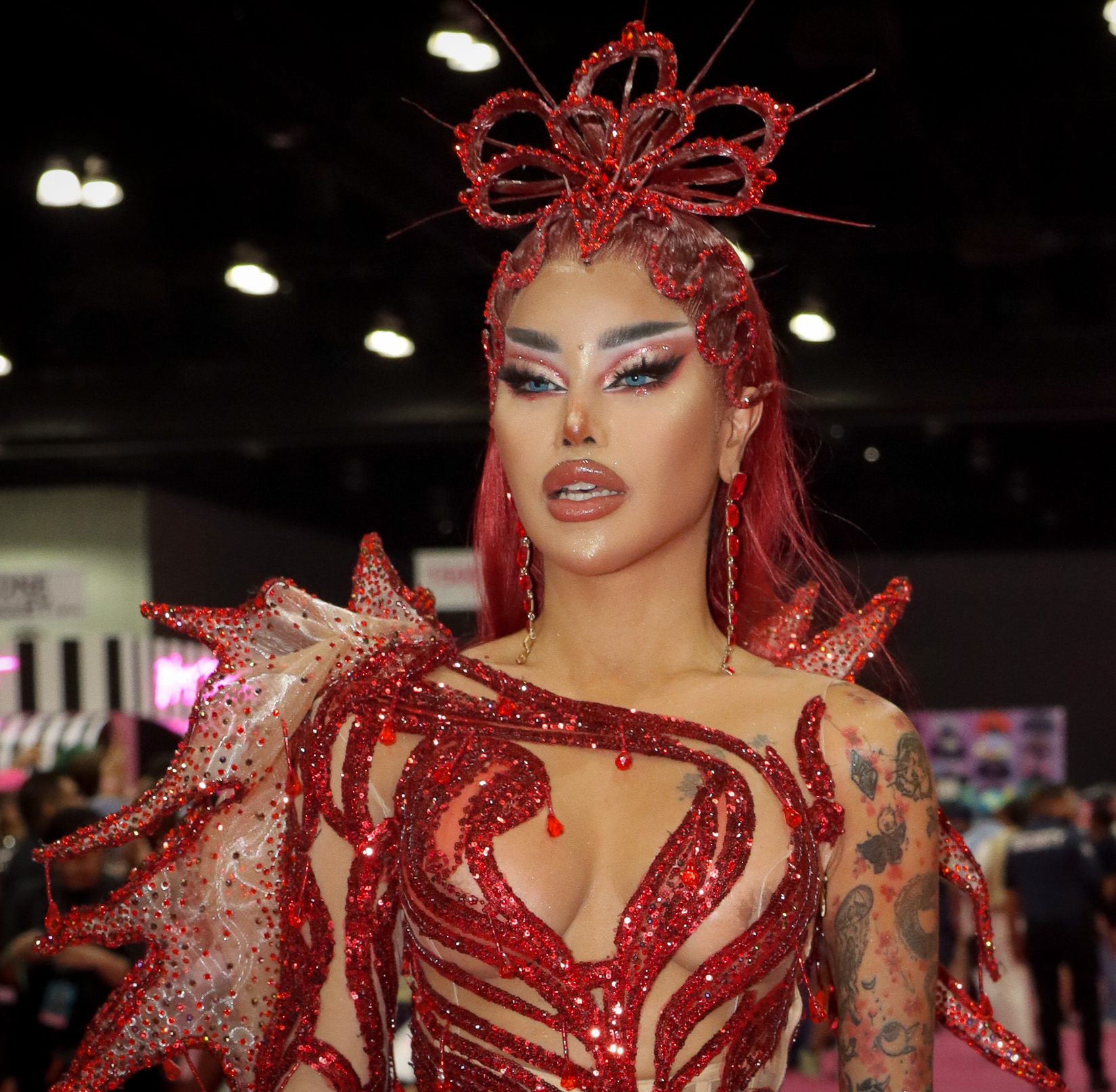
- M1ss Jade So at RuPaul's DragCon 2024
- Born: July 12, 1999 (age 27)
- Other name: Jade Rhian So
- Occupation: Drag queen
- Television: Drag Race Philippines (season 2)

M1ss Jade So is the stage name of Jade Rhian So, a Filipina drag performer who competed on season 2 of Drag Race Philippines. She would later return to compete on the first season of Drag Race Down Under vs. the World, representing the Philippines.

== Early life and education ==
M1ss Jade So was unable to attend her high school prom because school officials would not let her in wearing a dress, insisting she should wear "men's clothing".

== Career ==
M1ss Jade So is a drag performer. She competed on season 2 of Drag Race Philippines. She was one of the first three trans women contestants on the show, along with Bernie and Captivating Katkat. M1ss Jade So performed well during the girl group, design, and makeover challenges, but placed in the bottom during the Rusical and acting challenges. She also performed well, but exceeded the time limit during the advertisement challenge, and won the music video challenge. She was a top four finalist.

== Personal life ==
M1ss Jade So has been discriminated against because of her gender identity.

On July 20, 2026, So appeared on a TikTok livestream experiencing a mental health crisis that caused concern among the general public. Her management published a statement requesting the public to avoid sharing clips from the livestream. On her Instagram account a few days later, So assured fans that mental health professionals are helping her recover, thanking her friends, family, and supporters for their "non-stop love and comfort".

== Filmography ==
- Drag Race Philippines (season 2, 2023)
- Touch-Ups with Raven (2024)
- Tongue Thai'd (2025)
- Bring Back My Girls (2025)
- Drag Race Down Under vs. the World (2026)
