= WOW Presents Plus =

Streaming service owned by World of Wonder

- The logo of WOW Presents Plus.

- Screenshot Screenshot of WOW Presents Plus' English website in 2022.
- Company type: Public
- Website type: OTT streaming platform
- Available in: List: Arabic; Chinese (Cantonese & Mandarin); English (American & British); French; German; Indonesian; Italian; Japanese; Korean; Portuguese (Brazilian); Spanish (European & Latin American)
- Headquarters: Los Angeles, California
- Country of origin: United States
- Area served: Worldwide (excluding Mainland China, Russia, North Korea and Syria)
- Owner: World of Wonder
- Founders: Randy Barbato; Fenton Bailey
- Industry: Entertainment industry
- Products: Streaming media; Pay television; Video on demand
- Services: Film production; Film distribution; Television production; Television distribution
- Website: www.wowpresentsplus.com
- IPv6 support: Yes
- Registration: Required
- Launched: November 2017; 9 years ago
- Current status: Active

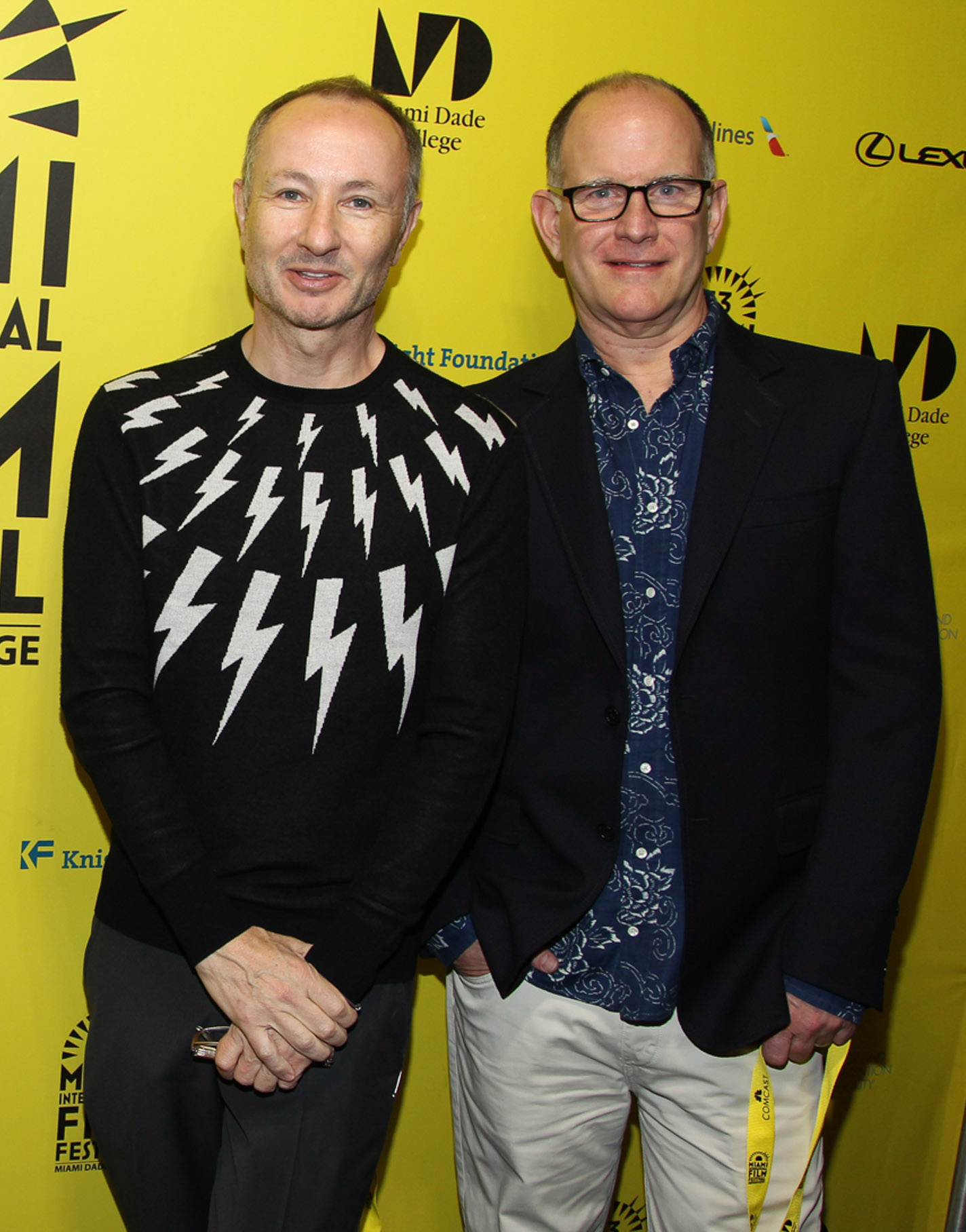
Fenton Bailey (left) and Randy Barbato (right) are the co-founders for the streaming platform WOW Presents Plus.

WOW Presents Plus (also called World of Wonder Presents Plus or WOWPresents+) is a subscription-based streaming service owned by production company, World of Wonder. The subscription service was founded in November 2017, by Randy Barbato and Fenton Bailey. The service offers a multitude of original series, including shows like Painted with Raven and UNHhhh.

This service also exclusively includes RuPaul's Drag Race (though it is not available in the US) and its incarnations of the franchise. Many web series from WOW Presents' YouTube channel are included in their subscription service. Business Insider names WOW Presents Plus the "best streaming service for 'Drag Race' fans".

== Distribution ==
The cost of the subscription service is $5.99 USD a month, for the yearly cost is $99.99 USD. It also offers users to download episodes for offline viewing. The streaming platform supports access through most modern web-browsers, such as iOS/iPadOS, Android and Android TV devices, Apple TV, Amazon Fire TV, and Roku.

== Original programming ==
WOW Presents Plus began to produce its own original content. Starting Trixie Mattel and Katya Zamolodchikova, hosting UNHhhh (an unscripted webseries), that premiered on YouTube then later included to the streaming service for its uncensored content. The first production series released is God Shave the Queens, which is their first original docuseries showcasing the RuPaul's Drag Race UK tour in the United Kingdom. World of Wonder announced new show lineups from early 2022. Many drag queens such as Jinkx Monsoon, Pangina Heals, Heidi N' Closet, and Rock M. Sakura; will star in their shows.

Key
| † | Currently airing program |
| ‡ | Program announced or renewed |
| # | Program no longer in production |
| ⁂ | Status of program unknown |

=== Animation ===
| Title | Genre | Premiere | Seasons | Runtime | Status |
|---|---|---|---|---|---|
| Drag Tots | Adventure | June 27, 2018 | 2 seasons | 2–5 min | # |

=== Comedy ===
| Title | Genre | Premiere | Seasons | Runtime | Status |
|---|---|---|---|---|---|
| Rock M. Sakura Sexy Superhero Sickening Spectacular | Comedy | March 3, 2021 | 1 season | 8–11 min | # |
| Why R Humans? | Comedy | March 30, 2022 | 1 season | 14–19 min | # |
| Sketchy Queens | Sketch comedy | September 15, 2022 | 2 seasons | 11–46 min | ⁂ |
| House of Laughs | Stand-up comedy | April 2, 2024 | 1 season | 17–24 min | ⁂ |
| Drag Me to the Movies | Parody | May 15, 2024 | 1 season | 11–13 min | ⁂ |
| Ginger's House | Comedy | October 16, 2024 | 1 season | 9–10 min | ⁂ |

=== Documentary ===
| Title | Genre | Premiere | Seasons | Runtime | Status |
|---|---|---|---|---|---|
| Werq the World | Docuseries | June 5, 2019 | 2 seasons | 23–36 min | # |
| Alyssa Raw | Docuseries | November 25, 2019 | 1 season | 10–14 min | # |
| God Shave the Queens | Docuseries | September 10, 2020 | 2 seasons | 18–24 min | # |
| Frock Destroyers: Frockumentary | Docuseries | March 15, 2022 | 1 season | 18–23 min | # |
| Click Boys | Docuseries | February 27, 2023 | 1 season | 7–13 min | # |
| Keeping Up with Krystal Versace | Docuseries | June 29, 2023 | 1 season | 7–13 min | # |
| RuPaul's Drag Race Live Untucked | Docuseries | April 17, 2024 | 2 seasons | 22–29 min | ⁂ |
| House on Fire | Docuseries | June 4, 2024 | 1 season | 45–53 min | ⁂ |
| My Untucked Life | Docuseries | October 7, 2025 | 3 seasons | 7–17 min | † |

=== Reality ===
| Title | Genre | Premiere | Seasons | Runtime | Status |
|---|---|---|---|---|---|
| What's My Game? with Priyanka | Game show | May 13, 2021 | 1 season | 15–21 min | # |
| Painted with Raven | Competition | November 25, 2021 | 2 seasons | 40–45 min | # |
| Vanjie: 24 Hours of Love | Competition | June 9, 2022 | 1 season | 15–35 min | # |
| Drag Race México (season 2) | Competition | June 20, 2024 | 1 season | 61–93 min | ‡ |
| Drag Race Thailand (season 3) | Competition | October 16, 2024 | 1 season | 67–71 min | ⁂ |
| Drag Race Brasil (season 2) | Competition | July 10, 2025 | 1 season | 61–70 min | ⁂ |
| Drag Race Philippines: Slaysian Royale | Competition | August 13, 2025 | 1 season | 68–75 min | ⁂ |

=== Unscripted ===
| Title | Genre | Premiere | Seasons | Runtime | Status |
|---|---|---|---|---|---|
| UNHhhh | Comedy | March 25, 2016 | 8 seasons | 4–15 min | # |
| Wait, What? | Trivia show | February 5, 2018 | 4 seasons | 7–17 min | † |
| Trixie and Katya Save the World | Talk show | March 30, 2020 | 1 season | 9–14 min | # |
| The Vivienne Takes on Hollywood | Comedy | April 9, 2020 | 1 season | 14–16 min | # |
| All the Queens' Men | Talk show | November 23, 2020 | 2 seasons | 8–11 min | # |
| Gay Sex Ed | Talk show | May 11, 2021 | 2 seasons | 16–26 min | # |
| Tartan Around with Lawrence Chaney | Comedy | May 10, 2022 | 1 season | 15–19 min | # |
| Muff Busters | Talk show | September 12, 2022 | 1 season | 9–11 min | # |
| Bring Back My Girls | Reunion show | October 18, 2022 | 4 seasons | 25–37 min | ⁂ |
| Tongue Thai'd with Pangina Heals | Talk show | December 6, 2022 | 3 seasons | 11–17 min | ⁂ |
| Kerri Kares | Talk show | January 25, 2023 | 1 season | 7–16 min | # |
| Alyssa's Secret: The Reboot | Talk show | April 26, 2023 | 1 season | 7 min | # |
| Jimbo Presents: It's My Special Show | Talk show | August 7, 2023 | 1 season | 10–15 min | # |
| Inside the Producers Studio with Kandy Muse | Talk show | August 7, 2023 | 1 season | 10–15 min | # |
| Ts Madison Ate That | Talk show | September 11, 2023 | 1 season | 10–15 min | # |
| Avalon TV | Variety show | October 9, 2023 | 2 seasons | 20–32 min | ⁂ |
| Sissy That Psyche | Talk show | November 6, 2023 | 1 season | 12–15 min | # |
| Grag Hearts Drag | Reunion/Travel show | November 8, 2023 | 1 season | 15–19 min | # |
| Chill with Phil | Crafting show | November 22, 2023 | 1 season | 12–13 min | # |
| Hey Qween! | Talk show | January 22, 2024 | 2 seasons | 30–47 min | ⁂ |
| Touch-Ups with Raven | Talk show | September 11, 2024 | 2 seasons | 12–13 min | ⁂ |
| Painting with Raven | Talk show | October 8, 2024 | 1 season | 20–24 min | ⁂ |
| Hello Hello Hello | Talk show | January 27, 2025 | 2 seasons | 10 min | ⁂ |
| Happy Endings with Bruno | Talk show | July 5, 2025 | 1 season | 11–14 min | ⁂ |
| Scroll Patrol | Talk show | November 12, 2025 | 2 seasons | 5–9 min | ⁂ |
| I Said What I Said | Talk show | December 8, 2025 | 1 season | 16–17 min | ⁂ |
| F**K This with Discord Addams | Talk show | May 22, 2026 | 1 season | 4–7 min | † |

=== Films ===
==== Documentary ====
| Title | Premiere | Runtime | Ref. |
|---|---|---|---|
| Cherry Valentine: Gypsy Queen and Proud | January 25, 2022 | 55 min | |
| Dear Viv | August 28, 2025 | 61 min | |

== Exclusive programming ==
WOW Presents Plus exclusively broadcast the many incarnations of the Drag Race franchise. However, all incarnations are not available on the service in their original countries, since they are broadcast on local network or service (for example, RuPaul's Drag Race or RuPaul's Drag Race All Stars are available worldwide, except in the United States) with the exception of the versions in Mexico, Brazil, Germany, and the Philippines .

Key
| † | Currently airing program |
| ‡ | Program announced or renewed |
| # | Program no longer in production |
| ⁂ | Status of program unknown |

=== Reality ===
| Title | Original network | Premiere | Seasons | Runtime | Status |
|---|---|---|---|---|---|
| RuPaul's Drag Race | Current; MTV (s. 15–); Former; Logo TV (s. 1–8); VH1 (s. 9–14) | February 2, 2009 | 18 seasons | 42–60 min | ‡ |
| RuPaul's Drag Race: Untucked | Current; MTV (s. 14–); Former; Logo TV (s. 1–5); YouTube (s. 6–8); VH1 (s. 9–13) | February 1, 2010 | 17 seasons | 20 min | ⁂ |
| RuPaul's Drag Race All Stars | Current; Paramount+ (s. 6–); Former; Logo TV (s. 1–2); VH1 (s. 3–5) | October 22, 2012 | 11 seasons | 42–60 min | † |
| RuPaul's Drag Race All Stars: Untucked! | Current; Paramount+ (s. 3–); Former; Logo TV (s. 1); VH1 (s. 2) | October 22, 2012 | 8 seasons | 20 min | † |
| Drag Race Thailand (seasons 1–2) | Line TV | February 15, 2018 | 2 seasons | 47-60 min | # (Note: While no longer airing on a local network, subsequent seasons were released as WOW Presents Plus exclusives globally.) |
| RuPaul's Drag Race UK | BBC Three | October 3, 2019 | 7 seasons | 60–70 min | ‡ |
| Canada's Drag Race | Crave | July 2, 2020 | 6 seasons | 60 min | ‡ |
| Drag Race Holland | Videoland | September 18, 2020 | 2 seasons | 60 min | ⁂ |
| Drag Race Down Under | Stan/TVNZ 2 | May 1, 2021 | 4 seasons | 60 min | ⁂ |
| Drag Race España | Atresplayer | May 30, 2021 | 5 seasons | 60 min | ‡ |
| Drag Race Italia | Current; MTV (s. 3–); Former; Discovery+ (s. 1–2) | November 18, 2021 | 3 seasons | 70–95 min | ⁂ |
| Queen of the Universe | Paramount+ | December 2, 2021 | 2 seasons | 60 min | # |
| RuPaul's Drag Race: UK vs. the World | BBC Three | February 1, 2022 | 3 seasons | 60–70 min | ⁂ |
| Drag Race France | Current; France 2 (s. 3–); Former; France.tv Slash (s. 1-2) | June 25, 2022 | 3 seasons | 60 min | ‡ |
| Drag Race Philippines | HBO Go | August 17, 2022 | 3 seasons | 60 min | ‡ |
| Drag Race Philippines: Untucked! | HBO Go | August 19, 2022 | 3 seasons | 20 min | ⁂ |
| Canada's Drag Race: Canada vs. the World | Crave | November 18, 2022 | 2 seasons | 60 min | ⁂ |
| Drag Race Belgique | Tipik | February 16, 2023 | 2 seasons | 60 min | ⁂ |
| Drag Race Sverige | SVT1 | March 4, 2023 | 1 season | 60 min | ⁂ |
| Drag Race Sverige: Untucked! | SVT1 | March 4, 2023 | 1 season | 20 min | ⁂ |
| Big Freedia Means Business | Fuse | June 7, 2023 | 1 season | 25-30 min | ⁂ |
| Drag Race México (season 1) | MTV | June 22, 2023 | 1 season | 60 min | # |
| Drag Race Brasil (season 1) | MTV | August 30, 2023 | 1 season | 60 min | # |
| Drag Race Germany | MTV | September 5, 2023 | 1 season | 60 min | ⁂ |
| Drag Race España All Stars | Atresplayer | February 4, 2024 | 1 season | 60 min | ‡ |
| RuPaul's Drag Race Global All Stars | Paramount+ | August 16, 2024 | 1 season | 44-52 min | ⁂ |
| Slaycation | Crave | December 31, 2024 | 2 seasons | 37-47 min | ⁂ |
| Drag Race France All Stars | France 2 | July 10, 2025 | 1 season | 72-93 min | ⁂ |

=== Unscripted ===
| Title | Original network | Premiere | Seasons | Runtime | Status |
|---|---|---|---|---|---|
| Drama Queens, chez Paloma | France.tv Slash | June 30, 2023 | 1 season | 10-15 min | # |
| The After Shave with Danny Beard | BBC Three | September 28, 2023 | 1 season | 10-15 min | # |

=== Comedy ===
| Title | Original network | Premiere | Seasons | Runtime | Status |
|---|---|---|---|---|---|
| I Hate People, People Hate Me | CBC Gem | January 13, 2025 | 1 season | 11–14 min | ⁂ |

== Upcoming original programming ==
Key
| ‡ | Program announced |

| Title | Genre | Premiere | Seasons | Runtime | Status |
|---|---|---|---|---|---|
| Canada's Drag Race All Stars | Reality show | July 9, 2026 | 1 season | TBA | ‡ |
| Drag Race Down Under vs. the World | Reality show | July 24, 2026 | 1 season | TBA | ‡ |
| Drag Race South Africa | Reality show | TBA | 1 season | TBA | ‡ |
| Drag Race México: Latina Royale | Reality show | TBA | 1 season | TBA | ‡ |
