= Pangina Heals =

Drag performer (born 1988)

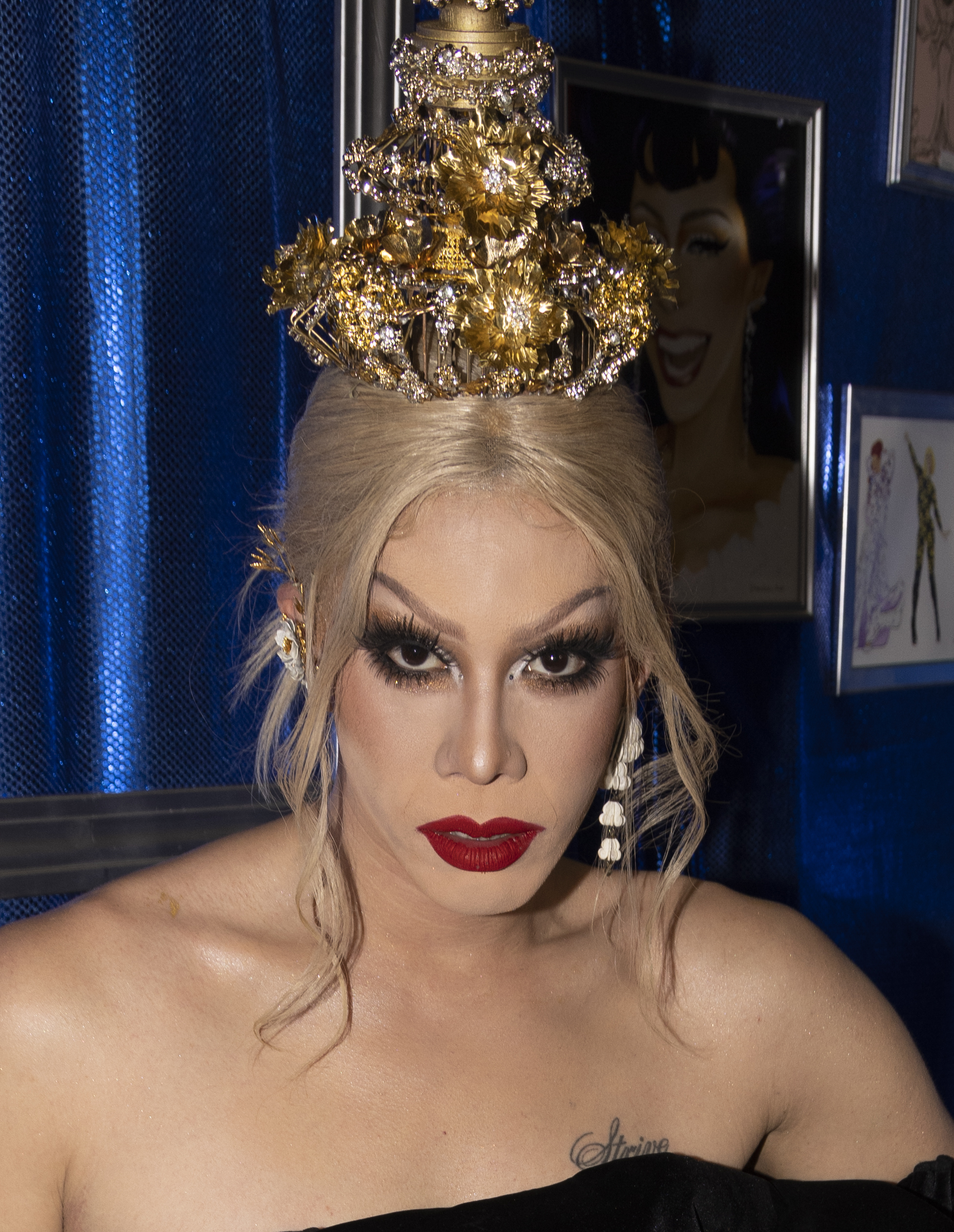
- Pangina Heals at RuPaul's DragCon in 2022
- Born: Pan Pan Narkprasert; July 22, 1988 (age 38); Bangkok, Thailand
- Education: University of California, Los Angeles (BFA)
- Occupations: Drag queen; model
- Known for: Drag Race Thailand; RuPaul's Drag Race: UK vs. the World (series 1)

Pan Pan Narkprasert (Thai: ปันปัน นาคประเสริฐ; born July 22, 1988), known as Pangina Heals, is a Thai drag queen and judge on Drag Race Thailand, who later went on to compete on the first series of RuPaul's Drag Race: UK vs. the World (2022). He has been described as one of the most popular drag performers in Asia, and is often called the RuPaul of Thailand. Narkprasert founded the Bangkok drag venue, House of Heals.

== Early life and education ==
Narkprasert was born to a Thai father and a Taiwanese mother in Bangkok. He was a student at Shrewsbury International School and Harrow International School Bangkok. He was bullied by his peers and battled depression and bulimia. He later lived in Los Angeles for four years, where he studied fine arts at the University of California, Los Angeles.

After graduating, Narkprasert returned to spend a year navigating Bangkok’s art scene. He entered his first competition, a Lady Gaga lookalike competition, in 2010 and won a trip to New York City to see her perform in concert. Eventually, with the help of local drag performer Sira Soda, he learned how to dress and put on makeup.

== Career ==
Narkprasert chose his drag name as a reference to the drag queen Ongina and the super continent Pangaea. By 2011, Narkprasert had made a name for himself as Thailand's waacking queen, and he would go on to win T Battle 2014, Thailand’s first reality TV drag competition. Pangina Heals continued to hone his craft by hosting a weekly LGBTQI+ night in Bangkok at the upmarket cabaret bar Maggie Choo's.

Pangina Heals made his acting debut after joining the main cast of the play, The Lisbon Traviata, written by American playwright Terrence McNally and produced by English-language multicultural theatre group Culture Collective Studio, where he portrayed Mendy. Pangina Heals opened for Tube Gallery's 20th anniversary fashion show. He was a part of the lineup for Melbourne’s Drag Exp in 2020. In June 2021, he hosted Queer Got Talent, an online talent competition.

In 2020, Narkprasert opened House of Heals, a drag bar in Bangkok.

=== Television and film ===
As Pangina Heals, Narkprasert participated on Thailand's version of Lip Sync Battle and won the competition with a rendition of Lady Gaga's "Telephone". He competed in and won T Battle, a Thai reality show where 13 local gender benders competed in singing, dancing and impersonation challenges. He also competed on Thailand Dance Now. In 2018, he was announced to co-host Drag Race Thailand, a Thai spin-off of RuPaul's Drag Race, produced by Kantana Group.

In January 2022, he was announced as one of the nine contestants on the first series of RuPaul's Drag Race: UK vs. the World, making his the first ever contestant to have judged an iteration of the show before entering the competition. In the premiere episode, Pangina Heals won the episode after beating Jimbo to a lipsync to "Say You'll Be There" by The Spice Girls, and chose to eliminate Lemon from the competition. In Episode 3, Pangina won for the second time after beating Dutch contestant Janey Jacké in a lipsync performance to "We Like to Party! (The Vengabus)" by the Vengaboys and eliminated Jimbo. Pangina Heals was eliminated in the following episode, the Snatch Game, by Blu Hydrangea, after his performance as Mariah Carey in the Snatch Game, which she did not react well to.

Pangina Heals has a drag "daughter", Felicia Heals, who appeared in the casting special for the second season of Drag Race Thailand, becoming the first cisgender female queen to appear in the franchise.

Heals was profiled in Pailin Wedel's 2026 documentary film Heals, which had its world premiere at the 2026 Inside Out Film and Video Festival.

== Filmography ==
=== Film ===
Year	Title	Role	Notes
2026	Heals	Self	
TBA	Lady Bangkok Boy †	Pangina Heals	Pre-production

=== Television ===
Year	Title	Role	Notes
2014	Thailand Dance Now	Himself	Contestant
2014	T Battle	Himself	Winner
2017	The Face Thailand Season 3	Himself	Special Guest (Episode 10: "Zorb Ball Catwalk")
2018	Lip Sync Battle Thailand	Himself	Guest
2018–present	Drag Race Thailand	Himself	Co-Host (seasons 1-2), Host (season 3)
2018	The Face All Star Thailand	Himself	Special Guest (Episode 3: "Outstanding")
2022	RuPaul's Drag Race: UK vs. the World	Himself	Contestant (6th place); Series 1
2023	RuPaul's Drag Race: All Stars	Himself	Lip Sync Assassin; Season 8
2023	Drag Race Philippines	Himself	Guest Judge (Episode 8); Season 2
2023	RuPaul's Drag Race UK	Himself	Special guest (Episode: "Tickety-Boo"); Series 5
2025	Drag Race Philippines: Slaysian Royale	Himself	Guest Judge (Episode 4); Season 1

=== Music videos ===
Year	Title	Artist	Ref.
2022	"The Motto" (Official Drag Video)	Ava Max and Tiësto	

=== Web series ===
Year	Title	Role	Notes	Ref.
2014	Queer as Fuck	Himself	Host	
2018	Rat Nok	Himself	Guest	
2018	Take Her Home	Himself	Guest	
2018	Loukgolf's English Room	Himself	Guest, Episode 178	
2019	Work Bitch Work	Himself	Guest	
2019	Follow Me	Himself	World of Wonder series; guest	
2019	Drag to Go Gro	Himself	Host	
2019	Bed Bitch & Beyond	Himself	Host	
2022	The Pit Stop	Himself	Guest	
2022	Bring Back My Girls	Himself	Guest	
2022	Tongue Thai'd	Himself	Host	
2023	Give It to Me Straight	Himself	Guest	
2024	RuPaul's Drag Race Live Untucked	Himself	WOWPresents Plus original	

== See also ==
- List of University of California, Los Angeles people
