= List of Drag Race Philippines episodes =

Drag Race Philippines is a Philippine reality competition television series based on RuPaul's Drag Race. The series debuted on 17 August 2022. The second season premiered on 2 August 2023. The third season followed on 7 August 2024.

== Series overview ==
Season	Contestants	Episodes	Originally released		Winner	Runner-up	Miss Congeniality
Season	Contestants	Episodes	First released	Last released	Winner	Runner-up	Miss Congeniality
1	12	10	17 August 2022	12 October 2022	Precious Paula Nicole	Marina Summers	Lady Morgana
2	12	10	2 August 2023	4 October 2023	Captivating Katkat	Arizona Brandy	Hana Beshie
3	11	10	7 August 2024	9 October 2024	Maxie	Khianna	Versex
4	12	TBA	25 September 2026	TBA	TBA	TBA	TBA

== Episodes ==
=== Season 1 (2022) ===
No. overall	No. in season	Title	Original release date
1	1	"Mabu-Heeey!"	August 17, 2022
2	2	"Sagalamazon"	August 17, 2022
3	3	"Pop Off Ate!"	August 24, 2022
4	4	"OPM Divas: The Rusical"	August 31, 2022
5	5	"Miss Shutacca"	September 7, 2022
6	6	"Snatch Game KNB?"	September 14, 2022
7	7	"The Shop Shop Ladies Ball"	September 21, 2022
8	8	"Twinning!"	September 28, 2022
9	9	"Charot of Fire"	October 5, 2022
10	10	"Grand Finale"	October 12, 2022

=== Season 2 (2023) ===
No. overall	No. in season	Title	Original release date
11	1	"Grand Opening Part 1"	August 2, 2023
12	2	"Grand Opening Part 2"	August 9, 2023
13	3	"Who Wore It Bettah?"	August 16, 2023
14	4	"Snatch Game" "Snatch Game KNB?"	August 23, 2023
15	5	"Sirena: The Rusical"	August 30, 2023
16	6	"Dramarama Mama!"	September 6, 2023
17	7	"Twinning: The Shequel"	September 13, 2023
18	8	"Branding-Ding-Ding!"	September 20, 2023
19	9	"The Main Event"	September 27, 2023
20	10	"Grand Finale - Philippines Season 2"	October 4, 2023

=== Season 3 (2024) ===
No. overall	No. in series	Title	Original release date
21	1	"Viral Queens"	August 7, 2024
22	2	"The Sustaina-Ball"	August 14, 2024
23	3	"Dapat Pakak!"	August 21, 2024
24	4	"Pao Presents Plus"	August 28, 2024
25	5	"Snatch Game" "Snatch Game KNB?"	September 4, 2024
26	6	"AaWicked Kita: The Rusical"	September 11, 2024
27	7	"Super Queens!"	September 18, 2024
28	8	"Lip Sync Lalaparuza Smackdown"	September 25, 2024
29	9	"Slay Accla, Slay!"	October 2, 2024
30	10	"Grand Finale" "GRAND T.I.T.E! (Totally Impressive Talent Extravaganza!)"	October 9, 2024

=== Season 4 (2026) ===
No. overall	No. in series	Title	Original release date
31	1	"Show Me Your T.I.T.E. (Totally Impressive Talent Extravaganza)"	September 25, 2026
32	2	"Can I Get An Eme?"	October 2, 2026
33	3	"Beks 2 Skul Ball"	October 9, 2026
34	4	"The Gayest Shokla: The Rusical"	October 16, 2026
35	5	"Snatch Game KNB?"	October 23, 2026
