= Kuan on One =

- Title card
- Genre: Talk show
- Created by: Jose Michael Alexander Magsaysay; Christian Gamboa; Romulo Rogerson Bulatao
- Showrunner: Frances Octaviano
- Written by: Precious Tracy Octaviano, France Espanol & Kervin Quieta
- Directed by: Joshue Isaac Dizon
- Presented by: Melai Cantiveros
- Country of origin: Philippines
- Original language: Cebuano
- No. of seasons: 5
- No. of episodes: 67

Production
- Executive producers: Carlo Katigbak; Cory Vidanes; Laurenti Dyogi; Eugenio C. Lopez IV
- Producer: Alex D. Asuncion
- Running time: 45-90 minutes
- Production companies: ABS-CBN Studios; Star Magic

Original release
- Network: YouTube iWant
- Release: July 2, 2024 – present

External videos
- Kuan on One Full Episodes (Seasons 1 to 4)

Kuan on One (Note: Translation note: the title is a play on the Cebuano word kuan and the English phrase "one on one") is a Philippine digital talk show by ABS-CBN Studios with association of Star Magic. Hosted by Melai Cantiveros-Francisco, it premiered on YouTube and iWant on July 2, 2024. It has been recognized as the first mainstream talk show in the Cebuano language.

Each episode features different celebrity guests who can speak in Cebuano or any other Visayan language such as Waray or Hiligaynon. Both the celebrity guest and Melai primarily communicate in their native language. English and Filipino subtitles are also available for non-Bisaya speakers.

The fifth season premiered on June 9, 2026.

== Development ==
The series was first announced on June 11, 2024, on ABS-CBN's social media pages. A mediacon for the series entitled "Kuan on One with the Media" was held on June 25 along with the release of the series' second trailer and a poster drop. The first season then premiered on July 2, 2024.

Kuan on One was later renewed for a second season, with a media conference for the second season entitled "Kuan on One and One with the Media" held last November 8, 2024, with drag queen Lady Morgana of Drag Race Philippines season 1 as the host. The second season then premiered on November 12, 2024.

Kuan on One would then be renewed for a third season which was announced on May 22, 2025. The season then premiered on June 17, 2025.

Kuan on One would further be renewed for a fourth season which was announced on November 5, 2025. During the media conference held on November 19, Cantiveros revealed AZ Martinez, Matteo Guidicelli, and Beauty Gonzalez as the newest celebrity guests for the upcoming season, which premiered on November 25.

Kuan on One was subsequently renewed for a fifth season, with the announcement made on May 26, 2026. A media conference, branded as #KuanConSeason5, was held on June 4, 2026, and was hosted by Season 2 guest Hana Beshie. During the event, Cantiveros revealed Ellen Adarna as the first celebrity guest of the upcoming season.

== Hosts ==
=== Main host ===
- Melai Cantiveros as "Kuantie" Melai Cantiveros-Francisco

=== Season 1 celebrity guests ===
- Kim Chiu (episode 1)
- Aiah Arceta of Bini (episode 2)
- Maymay Entrata (episode 3)
- Colet Vergara of Bini (episode 4)
- Christian Bables (episode 5)
- Vivoree Esclito (episode 6)
- Jason Dy (episode 7)
- Vina Morales (episode 8)
- Anji Salvacion (episode 9)
- KZ Tandingan and TJ Monterde (episode 10)
- Joj and Jai Agpangan (episode 11)
- JM Dela Cerna and Marielle Montellano (episode 12)
- Sheryn Regis (episode 13)
- Alora Sasam and Darla Sauler (episode 14)
- Regine Velasquez (episode 15)

=== Season 2 celebrity guests ===
Four new guests were revealed on November 28, 2024.

- Juan Karlos Labajo (episode 1)
- Kyle Echarri (episode 2)
- Jas Dudley-Scales and Binsoy Namoca of Pinoy Big Brother: Gen 11 (episode 3)
- Phillip Te Hernandez a.k.a. Davao Conyo (episode 4)
- Rain Celmar, Kolette Madelo, and Kai Montinola of Pinoy Big Brother: Gen 11 (episode 5)
- Enrique Gil (episode 6)
- Andi Eigenmann (episode 7)
- Sylvia Sanchez and Gela Atayde (episode 8)
- Khianna and Hana Beshie of Drag Race Philippines (episode 9)
- Morissette (episode 10)
- Chito Samontina (episode 11)
- Felip of SB19 (episode 12)
- Sisi Rondina (episode 13)
- Sofronio Vasquez (episode 14)

=== Season 3 celebrity guests ===
- Gerald Anderson (episode 1)
- Sofia Andres and Daniel Miranda (episode 2)
- Arthur Nery (episode 3)
- Esnyr Ranollo (episode 4)
- Maris Racal (episode 5)
- Charlie Fleming (episode 6)
- James Torres a.k.a. Bite King (episode 7)
- Deanna Wong (episode 8)
- Shuvee Etrata (episode 9)
- Zeke Abella (episode 10)
- Sue Ramirez (episode 11)
- Kaye Abad (episode 12)

=== Season 4 celebrity guests ===
Three new guests were first revealed on November 19, 2025.

- Beauty Gonzalez (episode 1)
- Matteo Guidicelli (episode 2)
- AZ Martinez (episode 3)
- BJ and Charlotte Bactong of Sweetnotes (episode 4)
- Karla Estrada (episode 5)
- Isabel Oli (episode 6)
- Justine Luzares (episode 7)
- Yamyam Gucong (episode 8)
- Elias J (episode 9)
- Mary Jean Lastimosa (episode 10)
- Dulce (episode 11)
- Jaime Onod a.k.a. Telma (episode 12)
- Krystal Mejes (episode 13)

=== Season 5 celebrity guests ===
- Ellen Adarna (episodes 1 and 2)
- Mark Bautista (episode 3)
- Paul Jake Castillo (episode 4)
- Gazini Ganados (episode 5)
- Chanda Romero (episode 6)
- Ian Mark Kamangkang a.k.a. Pitik Queen (episode 7)
- Iwa Moto (episode 8)
- Michael Giovan Sarthou III a.k.a. Chef Tatung (episode 9)
- Argel Saycon and Elyson de Dios (episode 10)
- Randolph Valmoria a.k.a. Run Dolph Vibes (episode 11)
- Richard Yap (episode 12)
- Jose Mari Chan (episode 13)

== Series overview ==
Season	No. of episodes	No. of guests (Note: If there are multiple guests in an episode, they are counted separately.)	Original Release	
Season	No. of episodes	No. of guests	First aired	Last aired
1	15	19	July 2, 2024	October 8, 2024
2	14	19	November 12, 2024	April 26, 2025
3	12	13	June 17, 2025	September 2, 2025
4	13	14	November 25, 2025	March 17, 2026
5	13	13	June 9, 2026	September 1, 2026

== Episodes ==
The episode titles and air dates displayed in the episode table are based on the episodes' YouTube videos, while the summaries are based on each episodes' descriptions on iWant. New episodes are released on Tuesdays.

Extended scenes, or moments not featured in the published episodes, are featured in some of the guests' appearances. The only people who can view these scenes are Super Kapamilya members who have a membership subscription to ABS-CBN Entertainment's YouTube channel. Beginning in the second season, each episode includes an extended scene, a format continued in the third season—these extended scenes are titled "KuanTuhan Uncensored".

=== Season 1 (2024) ===
The first season of Kuan on One premiered on July 2, 2024, and ran for 15 episodes featuring 19 guests.

No. overall	No. in season	Title	Original release date
1	1	"Kim Chiu: Tagsa-tagsa lang... ('One-by-one...')"	July 2, 2024 (Note: iWant broadcasts one episode 24 hours before it is uploaded to ABS-CBN Entertainment's YouTube channel the following day.)
KUANtie Melai-Cantiveros-Francisco sits down with the one and only "Chinita Princess" Kim Chiu to talk about their ironic and funny life experiences as Pinoy Big Brother Big Winners and Bisaya celebrities.
2	2	"Bini Aiah: Kanus-a man ta mag-boom, ma boom panes na lang ta... ('When will we boom? Maybe we'll just boom panes...')"	July 9, 2024 (Note: An extended scene is available for this episode.)
KUANtie Melai-Cantiveros-Francisco lends an ear to BINI Aiah as the Cebuana talks about the rejections she faced and her group's eventual rise to fame.
3	3	"Maymay Entrata: Hala uy, karon lang siguro ko maka-confess... ('Hey, maybe I can just confess now..')"	July 16, 2024
KUANtie Melai-Cantiveros-Francisco and "AMAKABOGERA" singer Maymay Entrata recall their most memorable experiences back when they were students and the hard lessons they have learned in the showbiz industry.
4	4	"Bini Colet: Mao to ang pinaka-intense na nanabo sa akong kinabuhi... ('That was the most intense thing that ever happened in my life...')"	July 23, 2024
Interviewed by KUANtie Melai Cantiveros-Francisco, BINI Colet recalls how she became a member of the nation's girl group and the moments she tapped into her inner strength to face life's challenges.
5	5	"Christian Bables: Kinahanglan kahibaw ka kanus-a ka mu-stop... ('You need to know when to stop...')"	July 30, 2024
KUANtie Melai Cantiveros-Francisco and award-winning actor Christian Bables discuss whether a man and a woman can only be friends. The two also talk about friendships, romance, and everything in between.
6	6	"Vivoree: Loyal ko sa akong crush... ('I am loyal to my crush...')"	August 6, 2024
KUANtie Melai Cantiveros-Francisco and Boholana actress Vivoree Esclito share their funny "main character" experiences whenever they return home from the capital. The two also talk about the importance of confidence and self-reliance.
7	7	"Jason Dy: Ang mga taga Butuan kay dagko’g kuan... ('The people of Butuan have big...')"	August 13, 2024
Hailing from Butuan City, The Voice champion Jason Dy talks about the diverse talents in Mindanao and recalls how he achieved his dream of becoming a singer.
8	8	"Vina Morales: Kung ingon si Lord nga maghatag ug blessing, ang mga Bisaya nag-nganga na... ('When the Lord said he would give a blessing, the Visayans were immediately speechless...')"	August 20, 2024
Ultimate Performer Vina Morales graces KUANtie Melai Cantiveros-Francisco's podcast studio to talk about her experiences as a daughter and as a mother.
9	9	"Anji Salvacion: Wala ko naulawan sa ila, nasakitan ko! ('I'm not ashamed of them, I'm hurt!')"	August 27, 2024
Pinoy Big Brother: Kumunity Season 10 Big Winner Anji Salvacion and KUANtie Melai Cantiveros-Francisco recall how strict their mothers were when they were young girls and share funny memories of their moms.
10	10	"KZ Tandingan & TJ Monterde: Kinsa ba ning nag-message sa imog 'nagkaon na ka baby?' ('Who sent you a message asking, have you eaten yet, baby?')"	September 3, 2024
Real-life couple TJ Monterde and KZ Tandingan talk about the time they first met and their sweet but challenging journey from close friends to lovers.
11	11	"Joj & Jai Agpangan: Basta Ilongga, gwapa! ('If you're Ilongga, you're beautiful!')"	September 10, 2024
Conversing in Hiligaynon, Ilonggo twins Joj and Jai Agpangan talk about their close bond as sisters and share how they were raised by their parents. The PBB alumnae also recall their most memorable experiences as siblings.
12	12	"JM Dela Cerna & Marielle Montellano: Murag nakaangay lang siya pero dili siya sure. ('It seemed like he liked it but he wasn't sure.')"	September 17, 2024
Tawag ng Tanghalan: Duets grand champions JM Dela Cerna and Marielle Montellano share their views on traditional versus modern-day courtship. They also open up about the real status of their relationship.
13	13	"Sheryn Regis: Gihilak la nako og two weeks... ('I just cried for two weeks...')"	September 24, 2024
Recalling her memorable defeat in Star in a Million, Crystal Voice of Asia Sheryn Regis opens up about the other times in her life when she nearly gave up but decided to persevere despite facing overwhelming challenges.
14	14	"Darla Sauler & Alora Sasam: Lahi pud ang pagka-solid fans sa mga Bisdak... ('The Visayans are on another level of being solid fans...')"	October 1, 2024
Proud Mindanaoans Darla Sauler and Alora Sasam bring barrels of laughter with KUANtie Melai Cantiveros-Francisco as they recount their most memorable fangirl moments.
15	15	"Regine Velasquez: Pastilan nga bata-a ka! ('Ah, you damn kid!')"	October 8, 2024
Asia's Songbird, Regine Velasquez-Alcasid, recalls how she fell in love with performing as a little girl in Leyte and how she rose to become one of the most influential singers in the country.

=== Season 2 (2024–2025) ===
The second season premiered on November 12, 2024, and ran for 14 episodes with 19 guests.

It was the first season to include extended scenes and the first to feature more than two guests in a single episode.

No. overall	No. in season	Title	Original release date
16	1	"JK Labajo: "Kinsa ba gi ingon nga bad boy ko? Kulatahon tika!" ('Who said that I was a bad boy? I'll beat you up!')"	November 12, 2024
Kuantie Melai Cantiveros-Francisco kicks off season two of her trending podcast Kuan on One with singer-songwriter Juan Karlos Labajo. Together, they dive into the stories and emotions behind the Cebuano artist's hit singles.
17	2	"Kyle Echarri: "...mao na ang usa ka reason kung ngano single pa ko karon." ('...that's one of the reasons why I'm still single today.')"	November 19, 2024
Cebuano actor-singer Kyle Echarri teams up with Kuantie Melai Cantiveros-Francisco to explore the complex and intricate dynamics of the Gen Z dating scene.
18	3	"Jas Dudley-Scales and Binsoy Namoca: "Kada naay ma-evict, paki-add sa group chat..." ('Whenever someone gets evicted, please add them to the group chat...')"	November 26, 2024
Pinoy Big Brother: Gen 11 housemates Jas Dudley-Scales and Binsoy Namoca get up close and personal with Kuantie Melai Cantiveros-Francisco as they share their experiences as the eldest siblings in their families.
19	4	"Davao Conyo: Private School vs. Public School!"	December 3, 2024
Kuantie Melai Cantiveros-Francisco sits down with content creator Phillip "Davao Conyo" Hernandez to dive into the life of the trending influencer and uncover the inspirations behind his viral, relatable skits.
20	5	"Kolette Madelo, Kai Montinola, and Rain Celmar: "Mao na ang i-manifest namong tulo, ang mag..." ('That's what the three of us will manifest, to...')"	December 10, 2024
Kuantie Melai Cantiveros-Francisco sits down with Pinoy Big Brother: Gen 11 stars Kai Montinola, Rain Celmar, and Kolette Madelo. The proud Bisdaks open up about how they manifest their dreams and take steps to turn them into reality.
21	6	"Enrique Gil: "Dako jud, dako!" ('It's big, it's big!')"	December 17, 2024
Visiting Kuantie Melai Cantiveros-Francisco, Cebuano actor and I Am Not Big Bird star Enrique Gil opens up about the realizations that changed his outlook on life. The "King of the Gil" also shares his fears and the things that bring him happiness.
22	7	"Andi Eigenmann: "Lami ang simple nga kinabuhi." ('The simple life is good.')"	January 7, 2025
Proud Bisdak at heart Andi Eigenmann joins Kuantie Melai Cantiveros-Francisco's podcast to share her love for Siargao and talk about her decision to settle down and start a family in the country's surfing capital.
23	8	"Sylvia Sanchez and Gela Atayde: "Lisod maging inahan, lisod maging ginikanan..." ('It's hard to be a mother, it's hard to be a parent...')"	January 14, 2025
Sylvia Sanchez sits down with Kuantie Melai Cantiveros-Francisco to discuss her journey and challenges as a breadwinner. Joined by her daughter, Gela Atayde, the FAMAS-winning actress reflects on the values they have shared with each other.
24	9	"Khianna and Hana Beshie: "Sobra ka-creative ang regional drag queens..." ('Regional drag queens are so creative...')"	January 21, 2025
Hailing from the City of Golden Friendship, Khianna and Hana Beshie share their inspiring journeys as regional drag queens in a lively and fun-filled interview with Kuantie Melai Cantiveros-Francisco.
25	10	"Morissette: "5 years ming walay istoryahay..." ('We haven't talked for 5 years...')"	January 28, 2025
Internationally acclaimed Cebuana singer Morissette joins Kuantie Melai Cantiveros-Francisco to share the challenges she overcame on her journey to earning the title of Asia's Phoenix.
26	11	"Chito Samontina: "Kung wala nako ‘to naagian, di ko maningkamot..." ('If I hadn't gone through this, I wouldn't have tried...')"	February 4, 2025
Davaoeño influencer and content creator Chito Samontina sits down with Kuantie Melai Cantiveros-Francisco to talk about their journeys to success and the importance of savoring the rewards of their hard work.
27	12	"Felip: "Kuantie Melai, pwede ko mangihi?" ('Kuantie Melai, can I pee?')"	February 11, 2025
SB19's Felip Jhon "Ken" Suson joins Kuantie Melai Cantiveros-Francisco's podcast to share his journey from childhood in Zamboanga del Sur to rising as a member of the country's Kings of P-Pop, recalling the challenges he overcame along the way.
28	13	"Sisi Rondina: "Wala ko kabalo nga naa diay sweldo..." ('I didn't know there was a salary...')"	February 19, 2025
Cebuana volleyball star Sisi Rondina steps off the hard court to join Kuantie Melai Cantiveros-Francisco, sharing her journey to becoming an MVP and the challenges she overcame along the way.
29	14	"Sofronio Vasquez: "Naanad ta na dili ta pilianon." ('We are used to not being chosen.')"	April 26, 2025 (Note: Considered a special episode, this installment was released nine weeks after the previous episode. Despite its delayed release, it remains part of Season 2, whose episodes were otherwise released weekly on Tuesdays.)
The Voice USA grand winner Sofronio Vasquez pays a special visit to Kuantie Melai Cantiveros-Francisco, sharing how he persevered through countless rejections and failures in pursuit of his passion and dreams.

=== Season 3 (2025) ===
The third season premiered on June 17, 2025, and ran for 12 episodes with 13 guests, the fewest in the series to date.

It is the first season without more than three guests in any episode and the first to feature a guest whose primary language is not Bisaya but speaks Bisaya, described by the show as “Bisaya by heart.” This season also continued the inclusion of extended scenes introduced in the previous season.

No. overall	No. in season	Title	Original release date
30	1	"Gerald Anderson: "Nawala na ang akong kahadlok mag-settle down." ('My fear of settling down is gone.')"	June 17, 2025
Kicking off the third season with a bang, Melai Cantiveros-Francisco sits down with Gerald Anderson to talk about his life experiences. The Sins of the Father star also shares how he juggles his career, business, and personal life.
31	2	"Sofia Andres and Daniel Miranda: "Dili lang unfollow... Gi-block ko!." ('Not just unfollowed… I was blocked!')"	June 24, 2025
Daniel Miranda and Sofia Andres visit Kuantie Melai Cantiveros-Francisco to share how they navigate unavoidable challenges as a young couple. They also open up about their life as millennial and Gen Z parents.
32	3	"Arthur Nery: "Mas sakit ang lyrics, mas dako ang gugma." ('The more painful the lyrics, the greater the love.')"	July 1, 2025
Bisdak chart-topper Arthur Nery opens up to Kuantie Melai Cantiveros-Francisco about his life in Cagayan de Oro and how his experiences inspired him to write and perform the heartfelt songs that resonate with the nation.
33	4	"Esnyr: "Donny Pangilinan gi-bookan kog hotel!" ('Donny Pangilinan booked a hotel for me!')"	July 8, 2025
Gen Z social media star Esnyr Ranollo chats with Kuantie Melai Cantiveros-Francisco about the inspiration behind his viral classroom skits and the memorable moments that helped shape his journey.
34	5	"Maris Racal: "Kung naay moabot, gihatag jud nako tanan." ('If someone comes, I truly gave it all.')"	July 15, 2025
Maris Racal finally sits down with Kuantie Melai Cantiveros-Francisco to share her journey from a simple girl in Tagum City to becoming one of the country's top actresses. She also opens up about surviving showbiz while staying true to her roots.
35	6	"Charlie Fleming: "Naghimo gyud kog eksena ‘day!" ('I really caused a scene, girl!')"	July 22, 2025
Fresh from the PBB House, Kapuso artist Charlie Fleming confidently answers Kuantie Melai Cantiveros-Francisco's questions about her journey as a young breadwinner and her dreams as she begins a new chapter in her life.
36	7	"Bite King: "Lipay ang akong heart karon." ('My heart is happy right now.')"	July 29, 2025
BisDak food content creator James "Bite King" Torres drops by to chat with Kuantie Melai Cantiveros-Francisco, sharing the key ingredients in his life that inspired his viral culinary creations.
37	8	"Deanna Wong: "Hilak ko day and night. Kung kabalo lang mo..." ('I cry day and night. If only you knew...')"	August 5, 2025
BisDak volleyball superstar Deanna Wong joins Kuantie Melai Cantiveros-Francisco to open up about how she faced her toughest battles both on and off the court.
38	9	"Shuvee Etrata: "Dili man ko Big Winner, dako ang natabang sa PBB sa akong pamilya…" ('I may not be the Big Winner, but PBB has greatly helped my family…')"	August 12, 2025
Kapuso artist Shuvee Etrata opens up to Kuantie Melai Cantiveros-Francisco about the challenges of being her family’s breadwinner and the countless blessings she has received following her iconic stay in the PBB House.
39	10	"Zeke Abella: "Naningkamot baya ko nga magpagwapo sa social media!" ('I’m really trying to look handsome on social media.')"	August 19, 2025
Gen Z content creator Zeke Abella brings out the giggles as he chats with Kuantie Melai Cantiveros-Francisco about the inspiration behind his hilarious skits and the challenges of life as an internet celebrity.
40	11	"Sue Ramirez: "Tanan nga para sa imo, makadto sa imo." ('Everything that is for you, goes to you.')"	August 26, 2025
Negrense actress Sue Ramirez opens up to Kuantie Melai Cantiveros-Francisco about how she is navigating life, love, career, and friendships in her 20s.
41	12	"Kaye Abad: "Na-feel nako na Cebuana na ko, katong…" ('I felt that I had become a Cebuana, that time when…')"	September 2, 2025
Cebuana at heart Kaye Abad-Castillo joins Kuantie Melai Cantiveros-Francisco for a lighthearted conversation about her journey as a wife and the challenges of motherhood.

=== Season 4 (2025–2026) ===
The fourth season premiered on November 25, 2025, and ran for 13 episodes with 14 guests.

No. overall	No. in season	Title	Original release date
42	1	"Beauty Gonzalez: "Pag maldita ka, bisan unsa ka pa ka-gwapa, maot na ka." ('When you have a bad attitude, no matter how beautiful you are, you still become unattractive.')"	November 25, 2025
Kickstarting the fourth season of “Kuan on One,” Beauty Gonzalez sits down with Kuantie Melai Cantiveros-Francisco to share stories about her childhood in Dumaguete City. She also opens up about her journey in showbiz and her newest chapter as a mom.
43	2	"Matteo Guidicelli: "Basta Bisaya, gahi!" ('If you’re Bisaya, you’re strong!')"	December 2, 2025
Hailing from Cebu, actor and entrepreneur Matteo Guidicelli visits Kuantie Melai Cantiveros-Francisco to talk about his life as a husband and businessman. He also shares how his faith guides him through life’s challenges.
44	3	"AZ Martinez: "Ang mga Bisaya kay wala’y dull moments." ('The Bisaya people never have dull moments.')"	December 9, 2025
Kapuso artist AZ Martinez opens up to Kuantie Melai Cantiveros-Francisco about her life as a Cebuana and the moment she was cast as one of PBB Collab’s housemates. She also shares her personal goals and the real score between her and Ralph de Leon.
45	4	"Sweetnotes: "Ga tugtog mi nga walay tawo. Mga lingkuranan lang." ('I was playing, but there was no audience—only chairs.')"	December 16, 2025
Husband-and-wife duo BJ and Charlotte Bactong of Sweetnotes Music bring the power of songs to the conversation as they share how their paths crossed and how they handle the fame and success of their band.
46	5	"Karla Estrada: "Ako an una nga iya guinyaknan…" ('I was the first one he invited…')"	January 13, 2026
Reuniting with Kuantie Melai Cantiveros-Francisco, Queen Mother Karla Estrada talks about her children and her childhood in Tacloban. She also opens up about what currently makes her heart happy.
47	6	"Isabel Oli: "Kung di ko niya pakaslan, bulagan nako siya sa December." ('If he does not marry me, I will leave him in December.')"	January 20, 2026
Sitting down with Kuantie Melai Cantiveros-Francisco for a lighthearted heart-to-heart, Cebuana model and actress Isabel Oli-Prats opens up about her life as a wife and a mother of three.
48	7	"Justine Luzares: "Wa ko magdahom nga mahimo kong content creator…" ('I did not expect that I would become a content creator.')"	January 27, 2026
In a one-on-one interview with Kuantie Melai Cantiveros-Francisco, content creator Justine Luzares talks about his humble beginnings in Albuera, Leyte. He also recalls how he started making his viral skits and opens up about his goals in life.
49	8	"Yamyam Gucong: "Nag-audition ko sa PBB kay nag-audition ang akong uyab…" ('I auditioned for PBB because my partner was auditioning.')"	February 3, 2026
PBB Otso Big Winner Yamyam Gucong shares funny stories about his simple life in Inabanga, Bohol, and recalls how he became one of Kuya’s housemates. He also opens up about how he got through one of the lowest points in his life.
50	9	"Elias J: "Bisan usa ka bulan lang, maharuhay ang kinabuhi…" ('Even for just one month, life would be difficult.')"	February 10, 2026
In a candid one-on-one interview with Kuantie Melai, social media sensation Elias J opens up about his humble beginnings in Magpet, North Cotabato. The singer-songwriter also recalls how his music career began and shares his dreams for his family.
51	10	"MJ Lastimosa: "Wala may text book ang pagka-beauty queen." ('There is no textbook for being a beauty queen.')"	February 17, 2026
Miss Universe Philippines 2014 MJ Lastimosa reminisces about her simple yet memorable childhood in Cotabato as she sits down with Kuantie Melai. The iconic beauty queen also opens up about her family and her colorful journey in pageantry.
52	11	"Dulce: "Gi-amin niya nga gi-sumpa daw ko niya." ('He admitted that he supposedly cursed me.')"	February 24, 2026
Gracing Kuantie Melai’s podcast, Dulce opens up about her simple childhood in Bulacao, Cebu, and her colorful yet inspiring journey to stardom. The Asia’s Timeless Diva also bares her heart as she reflects on the greatest challenges of her life.
53	12	"Telma: "Bata pa lang ko, supportive na si papa sa akong kabayot." ('Even when I was still young, my father was already supportive of me being gay.')"	March 4, 2026
In an exclusive interview with Kuantie Melai, content creator Telma shares stories about her life growing up in Bislig City and her journey as a gay online celebrity. She also opens up about her reasons for relocating to Cebu.
54	13	"Krystal Mejes: "It akon kasing-kasing Waraynon!" ('My heart is Waraynon!')"	March 17, 2026
Fresh from the PBB house, Krystal Mejes visits Kuantie Melai to talk about her life growing up in Catbalogan, Samar, and what inspired her to pursue a career in showbiz. The 2nd Big Placer also opens up about the lessons she learned as a housemate.

=== Season 5 (2026) ===
The fifth season premiered on June 9, 2026, and ran for 13 episodes with 13 guests.

This season marked the first time in the show's history that a guest has appeared in more than one episode.

No. overall	No. in season	Title	Original release date
55	1	"Ellen Adarna, Part 1: "Ay nag pagminyo, panganak lang." ('Don’t get married, just have a child.') (Note: More natural translation, depending on intent: “No need to get married—just have a baby.”)"	June 9, 2026
Kicking off the new season with a bang, Kuantie Melai Cantiveros-Francisco welcomes Cebuana celebrity Ellen Adarna for a candid conversation about growing up in the Queen City of the South, her showbiz experiences, and her life as a mother of two.
56	2	"Ellen Adarna, Part 2: "Pag mo ingon kog ‘di ko’, di na ko." ('When I say ‘no,’ it means no.') (Note: More natural translation: “If I say no, then I mean it.”)"	June 16, 2026
Continuing her conversation with Kuantie Melai, Ellen Adarna takes on another round of “Dakong Problema,” where they take turns asking each other questions. Later, the Cebuana celebrity opens up about how she and Isabel Santos became friends.
57	3	"Mark Bautista: "Murag sign na siguro ni nga mas i-accept nako ang akong self." ('Maybe this is a sign that I should accept myself more.')"	June 23, 2026
Sitting down with Kuantie Melai, Bisdak Balladeer Mark Bautista opens up about his humble beginnings in Cagayan de Oro and his colorful journey in the music industry. He also recalls the traumatic experience that led him to publish his book in 2018.
58	4	"Paul Jake Castillo: "Karon lang ko niyo inimbitar…" ('You only invited me now.')"	June 30, 2026
Cebuano entrepreneur and former PBB housemate Paul Jake Castillo sits down with Kuantie Melai to talk about growing up in Cebu and how he earned a spot in Pinoy Big Brother: Double Up. He also opens up about his life as a husband and father.
59	5	"Gazini Ganados: "Ganahan ko ipakita sa tanan kung kinsa ko." ('I want to show everyone who I am.')"	July 7, 2026
MGI All Stars 2026 finalist Gazini Ganados sits down with Kuantie Melai Cantiveros-Francisco to share how pageantry helped her reconnect with her father. She also opens up about her mission to support her family in war-affected Gaza.
60	6	"Chanda Romero: "Ang akong story dili pa na tapos." ('My story isn't over yet.')"	July 14, 2026
Veteran actress Chanda Romero shares how her life growing up in Cebu City pushed her to try her luck in Manila. She also reflects on her decades-long career in show business and shares details about her upcoming role in Coco Martin’s Sigabo.
61	7	"Pitik Queen: "Ga-expect ko nga mag-attend sa akong graduation ang akong papa." ('I was hoping my father would attend my graduation.')"	July 21, 2026
Digital content creator Ian Mark Kamangkang joins Kuantie Melai to share the story behind the viral dance style that catapulted him to fame as the "Pitik Queen." He also opens up about his life in Lake Sebu, South Cotabato.
62	8	"Iwa Moto: "Nakapila na ming muntik magbulag." ('We’ve come close to breaking up many times.')"	July 28, 2026
Kapuso homegrown talent Iwa Moto visits Kuantie Melai Cantiveros-Francisco to talk about her life growing up in various cities across Mindanao. She also opens up about how she ended up becoming one of the country's most-recognized live sellers.
63	9	"Chef Tatung: "Dili lang para sa may kwarta ang makaon og lami." ('Good food isn’t just for the rich.')"	August 4, 2026
Taking a break from the heat of the kitchen, Chef Tatung joins Kuantie Melai Cantiveros-Francisco to share the ingredients for building a happy and successful life.
64	10	"Argel Saycon and Elyson de Dios: "Importante siya sa akoa." ('It is important to me.')"	August 11, 2026
Argel Saycon and Elyson de Dios look back on their simple lives in their respective hometowns as they share their passion for basketball. The matinee idols also take on a spicy yet hilarious game with Kuantie Melai in “Dakong Problema.”
65	11	"Run Dolph Vibes: "Di nato sayang-sayangon ang mga pagkaon." ('Let’s not waste food.')"	August 18, 2026
Bisdak influencer Run Dolph Vibes joins Kuantie Melai Cantiveros-Francisco to talk about her simple life growing up on Balut Island. She also shares how a single video changed her life.
66	12	"Richard Yap: "Actually nagbuwag jud mi." ('We really did break up.')"	August 25, 2026
Sitting down with Melai Cantiveros-Francisco, Cebuano actor Richard Yap talks about his unexpected rise to stardom. In “Dakong Problema,” he also recreates his iconic scenes from “Be Careful with My Heart” and “My Binondo Girl” with Kuantie.
67	13	"Jose Mari Chan: "Hinay-hinay lang ta." ('Let’s take things slowly.')"	September 1, 2026
Welcoming the ber-months with Kuantie Melai, Filipino hitmaker Jose Mari Chan graces “Kuan on One” to talk about his deep love for music and open up about the stories behind his iconic songs.

== Broadcast ==
This program also airs every Sunday afternoon on A2Z, All TV, Kapamilya Channel, and Kapamilya Online Live from October 6, 2024 until October 18, 2026.
