= Zymba Ding =

Filipino drag performer

- Born: Paul Hidacan; 2002 or 2003 (age 23–24); Tala, Caloocan, Philippines
- Occupations: Drag performer; actor; recording artist
- Years active: 2023–present
- Agent: Sony Music Philippines (2026–present)

Paul Hidacan, known professionally as Zymba Ding, is a Filipino drag performer, actor, and recording artist. His drag career started in 2023, when he won drag competitions such as Dragdagulan, Ikaw Nemen, and Bunganga Battle Royale. In 2024, he joined season three of Drag Race Philippines, where he competed in the finals but did not place in the Top 4. In June 2025, he made his theater debut as Katana G in the Philippine Educational Theater Association-produced Dalaga na si Maxie Oliveros (transl. Maxie Oliveros is now a woman). In 2026, he signed a record deal with Sony Music Philippines.

== Early life ==
Paul Hidacan was born in Tala, Caloocan, Philippines. He came from a highly religious family and his mother was a preacher. Shortly before his sister died, she worked as Brigiding's assistant when Drag Race Philippines' first season was airing and introduced Hidacan to him. Hidacan joined Brigiding's House of Ding and became his drag daughter, debuting the drag persona Zymba Ding.

== Career ==
=== 2023–present: Drag career, theater debut ===
Zymba began his drag career in 2023. He has won drag competitions such as Dragdagulan, Ikaw Nemen, and Bunganga Battle Royale. The latter took place weekly and was hosted by Viñas DeLuxe.

As of July 2024, Zymba was being trained by the Divine Divas (consisting of drag performers Brigiding, Viñas, and Precious Paula Nicole) at Rampa (transl. Catwalk), a nightclub in Quezon City owned by the Divas.

In the same year, he competed in Drag Race Philippines' third season. He was eliminated in episode nine, which aired on October 4. Tita Baby defeated Zymba in a lipsync, preventing him from joining the final Top 4 of the season.

In late 2024 to early 2025, Zymba's drag tributes gained praise from singers SZA and Doechii.

In June 2025, Zymba was cast as Katana G in Dalaga na si Maxie Oliveros (transl. Maxie Oliveros is now a woman), a queer musical produced by the Philippine Educational Theater Association and J+ Productions. In a review of the musical, Manila Bulletin's John Legaspi lauded the "fierce energy, sass, and heart" in Zymba's performance. He added that Zymba, alongside several of his fellow drag artists, formed the show's "emotional core".

In February 2026, Zymba signed a record deal with Sony Music Philippines.

== Personal life ==
Zymba is a gay man. He is also a Christian and has said that he incorporates his faith into his drag.

== Filmography ==
=== Television ===
| Year | Title | Role | Ref. |
|---|---|---|---|
| 2024 | Drag Race Philippines season 3 | Contestant | |

=== Theater ===
| Year | Title | Role | Production company | Ref. |
|---|---|---|---|---|
| 2025 | Dalaga na si Maxie Oliveros | Katana G | Philippine Educational Theater Association and J+ Productions | |
