= Marina Summers =

Filipino drag performer (born 1996)

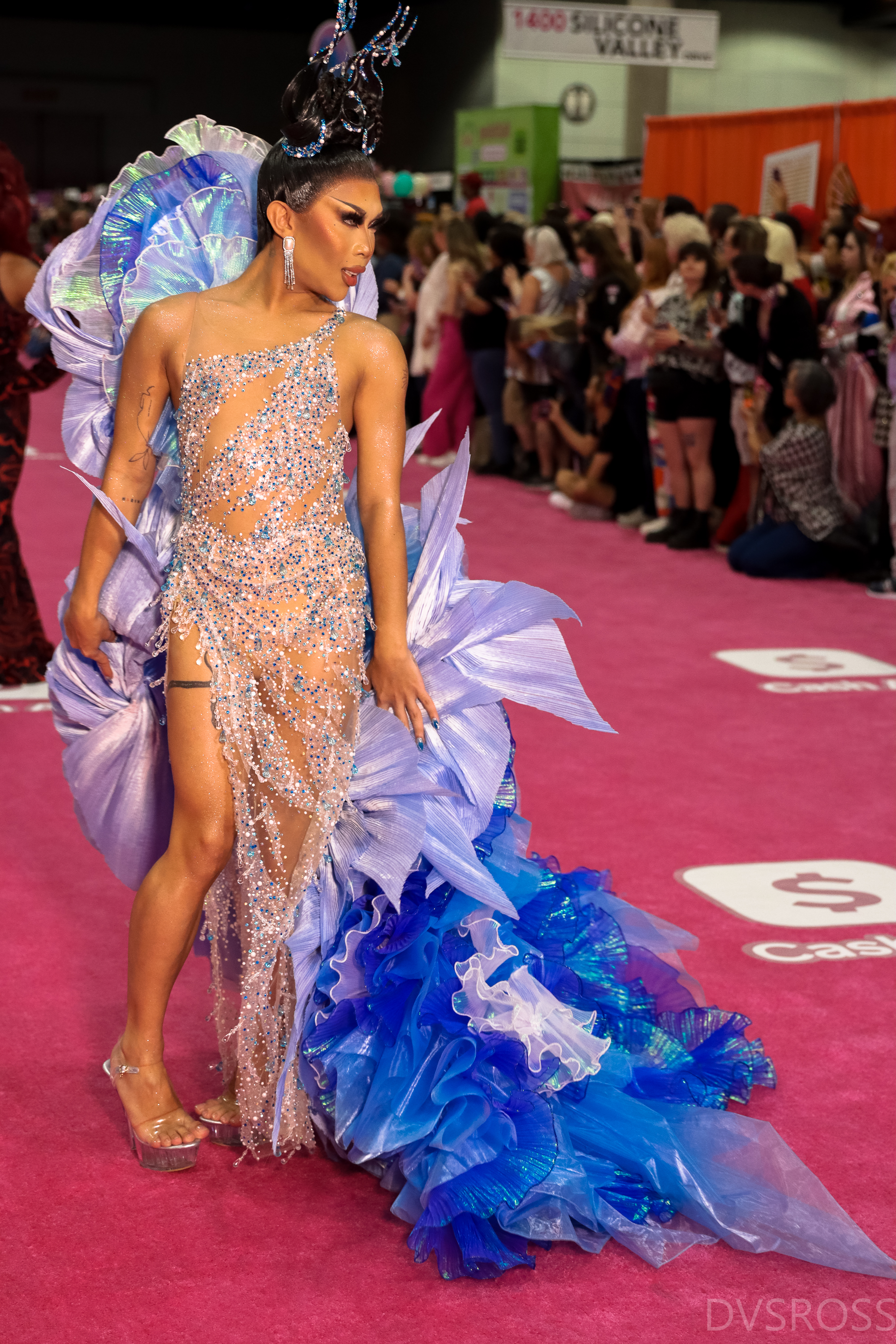
- Marina Summers at RuPaul's DragCon LA, 2023
- Born: November 28, 1996 (age 29); Bambang, Nueva Vizcaya, Philippines
- Other name: Marina Guinto Alabado
- Education: Polytechnic University of the Philippines (BA)
- Occupation: Drag performer
- Known for: Drag Race Philippines (season 1); RuPaul's Drag Race: UK vs. the World (series 2)

Marina Guinto Alabado (born November 28, 1996), known professionally as Marina Summers, is a Filipino drag performer, recording artist, and television personality. She was runner-up on the first season of Drag Race Philippines and later competed as a finalist on the second series of RuPaul's Drag Race: UK vs the World. In addition to her drag and television work, Summers has released music including "Divine," "Ride 4 Me," and "AMAFILIPINA." She hosted the Miss Universe Philippines 2026 coronation night, becoming the first transgender woman to host the pageant.

== Early life ==
Alabado was raised in Bambang, Nueva Vizcaya. In a 2022 interview with Teen Vogue, Summers said she became interested in performance at a young age and later found drag through Manila's queer nightlife scene.

== Career ==
Marina Summers is a drag queen who was a runner-up on season 1 of Drag Race Philippines. During her time on the show, she mended her relationship with former "drag mother" Xilhouete.

Summers released her debut single "I Have Arrived" in 2020. In late 2022, she released "Divine," produced by Moophs of Tarsier Records, followed by "Ride 4 Me". In 2024, she released "AMAFILIPINA," a reworking of Maymay Entrata's "AMAKABOGERA," which she performed during the premiere episode of RuPaul's Drag Race: UK vs. the World. Billboard Philippines reported that the song was released through Tarsier Records and that the official music video premiered in February 2024.

In June 2023, she and fellow Drag Race contestant Viñas DeLuxe performed a musical one-night show at Teatrino in Greenhills' Promenade as part of Pride Month. The show was called "One Night Only" and featured Maxie Andreison, Eva Le Queen, and P-pop girl group BINI as guests.

In January 2024, Summers was announced as one of the contestants on the second series of RuPaul's Drag Race: UK vs. the World, representing Drag Race Philippines. Entertainment Weekly reported that the season featured contestants from seven regions and was the first UK Drag Race season to include a cash prize.

In the premiere episode, Summers won the talent show challenge with a performance based on "AMAKABOGERA." ABS-CBN News reported that the performance used her version, "AMAFILIPINA."

Summers has walked the runway for Kay Morales at BYS Fashion Week in Makati, and was named an ambassador for makeup brand Strokes Beauty Lab. In 2023, she was featured on a Times Square billboard in New York City as part of as part of Spotify's "GLOW", described as "an equity program for LGBTQIA+ creators".

In 2024, Summers performed "AMAFILIPINA" during the opening number of Miss Universe Philippines 2024. This made her the first drag queen to perform at the pageant.

In December 2024, Summers had been cast as Glinda in a United Kingdom adult pantomime productions of The Wizard of Oz.

=== 2025 to 2026 work ===
In 2025, Summers appeared as a guest judge on Drag Race Philippines: Slaysian Royale. The series was the first all-Asian all-stars edition in the Drag Race franchise and listed Summers among the guest judges.

In 2026, Summers hosted the Miss Universe Philippines coronation at the SM Mall of Asia Arena. She become the first transgender woman to host the pageant, and had a hosting stint at the event.

== Personal life ==
Summers has publicly supported the SOGIE Equality Bill. In February 2026, she came out as a transgender woman.

== Filmography ==
=== Television ===
| Year | Title | Role | Notes | Placement |
|---|---|---|---|---|
| 2022 | Drag Race Philippines | Contestant | | Runner-Up |
| 2023 | Bring Back My Girls | Guest | Season 2; Episode 3 | Guest |
| 2024 | RuPaul's Drag Race: UK vs. the World | Contestant | | 3rd place (finalist) |
| 2025 | Rainbow Rumble | Contestant | Season 2; Episode 1 | Reached jackpot round: won 85,000 Philippine Peso |
| 2025 | Drag Race Philippines: Slaysian Royale | Guest Judge | Season 1; 2 episodes | |
| 2026 | Come Dine With Me: Celebrity Philippines | Host | | |

=== Web ===
| Year | Title | Role | Notes | Ref. |
|---|---|---|---|---|
| 2023 | The Stop Over | Herself | Host | |
| 2025 | Tongue Thai'd | Herself | Season 3; Episode 8 | |
| 2025 | Touch-Ups with Raven | Herself | Season 2; Episode 1 | |

== Awards and nominations ==
=== Listicles ===
Name of publisher, name of listicle, year listed, and placement result
| Publisher | Listicle | Year | Result | Ref. |
|---|---|---|---|---|
| Tatler Asia | Gen.T Leaders of Tomorrow | 2025 | Placed | |

== See also ==
- Transgender representation in the Drag Race franchise
