= Minty Fresh (drag queen) =

Filipino drag performer

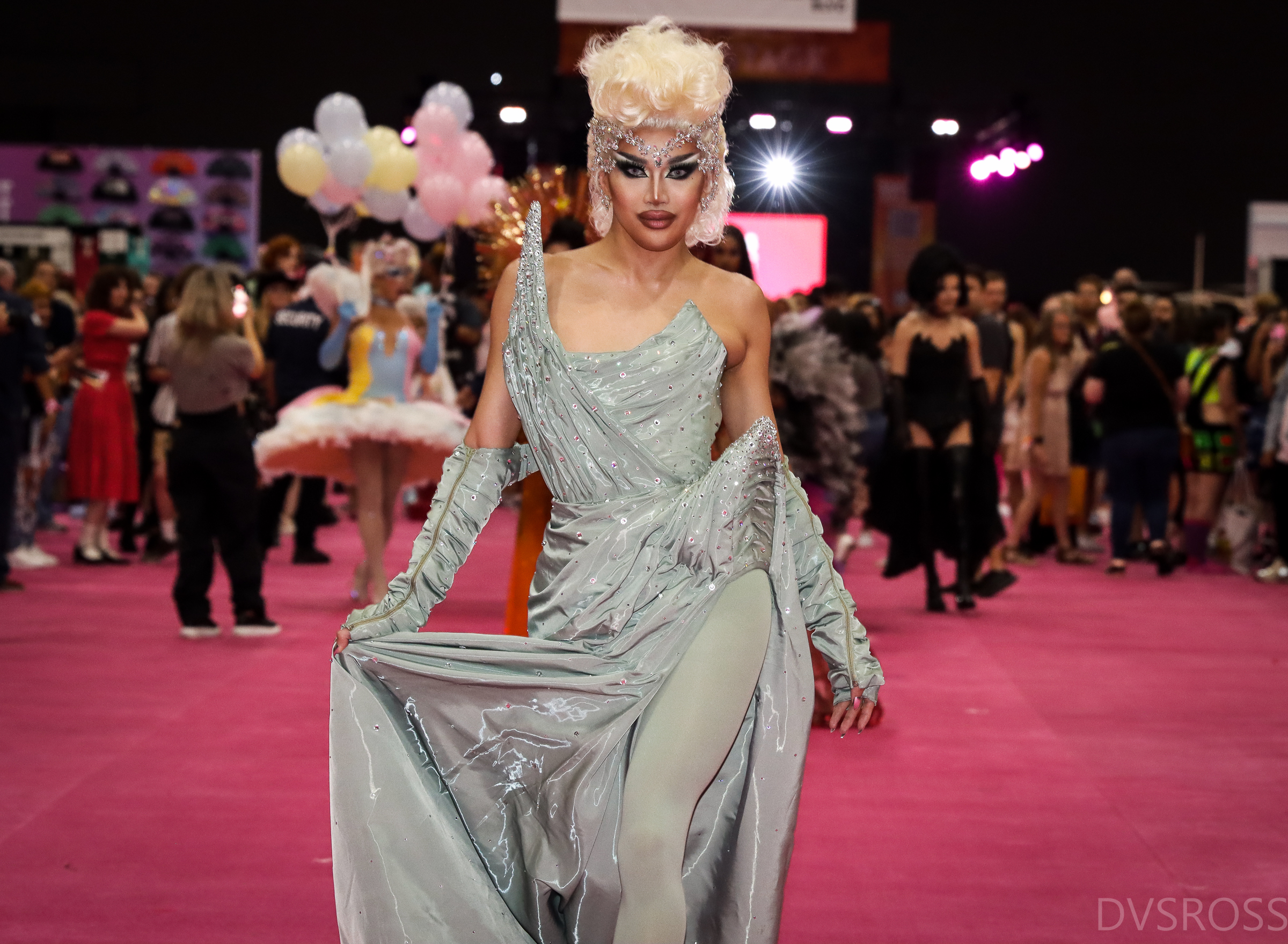
- Minty Fresh at RuPaul's DragCon LA in 2024
- Born: Min Ortiz; September 20, 1990 (age 35)
- Television: Drag Race Philippines (season 1)

Minty Fresh is the stage name of Min Ortiz (born September 20, 1990), a Filipino drag performer, designer, makeup artist, model, and singer who competed on the first season of Drag Race Philippines and the third season of RuPaul's Drag Race: UK vs. the World.

== Career ==
Minty Fresh is a drag performer who competed on the first season of Drag Race Philippines. She won two challenges. Minty Fresh impersonated Maria Sofia Love during the Snatch Game challenge. Her performance landed her in the bottom two, though Minty Fresh won the lip-sync against Brigiding to "Amakabogera" by Maymay Entrata. Another challenge saw Minty Fresh give a makeover to her sister. She landed in the bottom two but won the lip-sync against Brigiding to "Dyosa" by Yumi Lacsamana. Minty Fresh placed fifth overall, after losing a lip sync against Xilhouete to "You'll Always be My Number One" by Vernie Varga. CNN Philippines said Minty Fresh had an "iconic" confrontation with Brigiding on the show.

In 2022, Minty Fresh (and fellow contestant Lady Morgana) performed at the 'Hallyuween' concert at the Mall of Asia Arena.

== Filmography ==
=== Television ===
Year	Title	Role	Notes	Ref.
2022	Drag Race Philippines (season 1)	Contestant	5th place	
2022	Drag Race Philippines: Untucked (season 1)	Herself	10 episodes	
2026	RuPaul's Drag Race: UK vs. the World (series 3)	Contestant	9th place	

=== Web series ===
Year	Title	Role	Notes	Ref.
2023	Bring Back My Girls	Herself	Season 2, Episode 3	
2024	Add to Cart (Drag Race Philippines season 3)	Herself		
2025—2026	Add to Cart (Drag Race Philippines Slaysian Royale)	Herself		
