= Turing (drag queen) =

Filipino drag performer

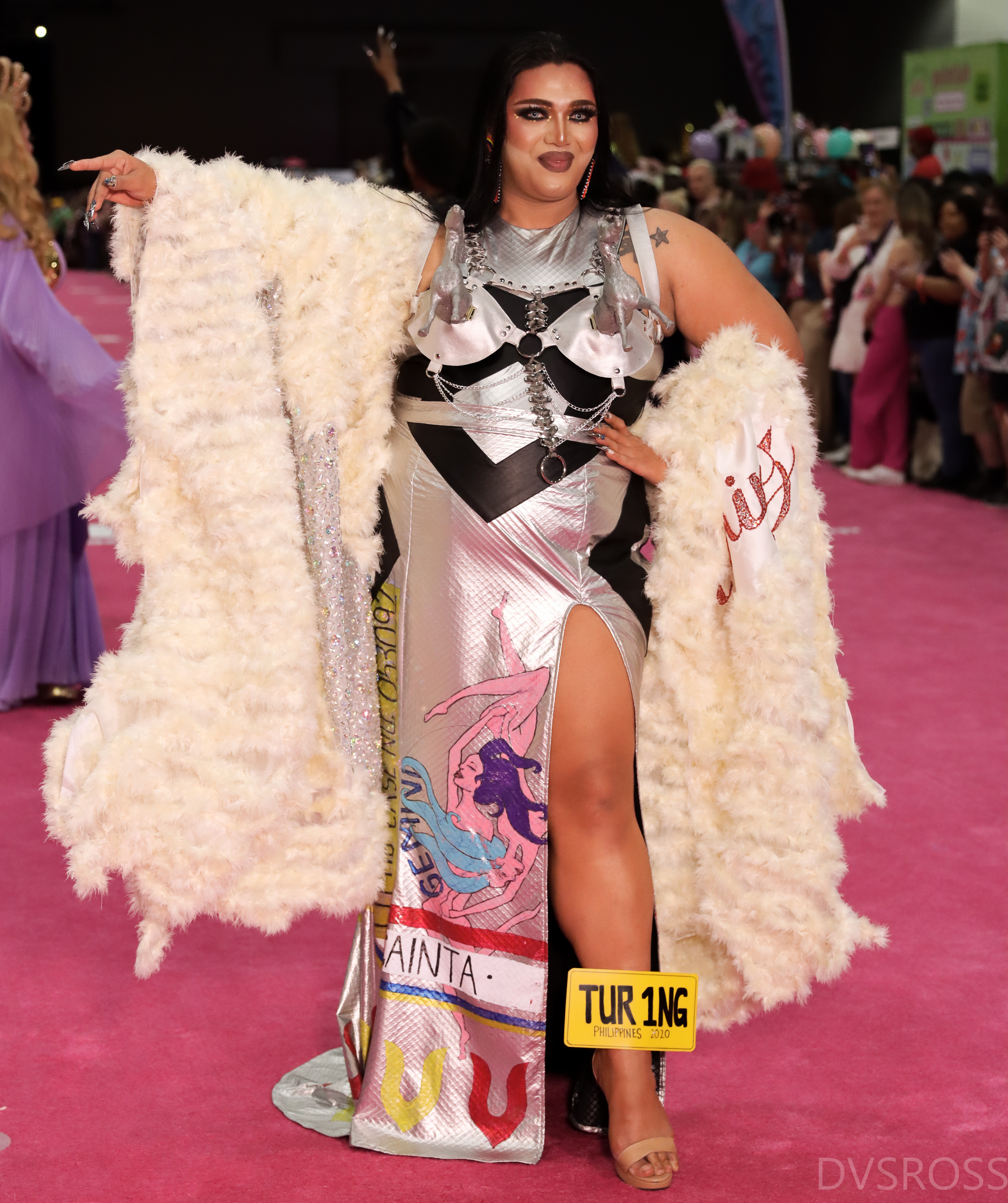
- Turing at RuPaul's DragCon LA, 2023
- Born: May 30, 1992 (age 34); Cainta, Rizal, Philippines
- Other name: Turing Quinto
- Occupations: Drag queen; actress
- Television: Drag Race Philippines (season 1)

Turing (also known as Turing Quinto; born May 30, 1992) is a Filipino drag performer who competed on season 1 of Drag Race Philippines.

== Early life and education ==
Turing was born in Cainta, and has a degree in theater.

== Career ==
Turing is a drag performer. She has performed regularly at O Bar. Turing competed on season 1 of Drag Race Philippines. She was featured in GCash's short film directed by Antoinette Jadaone for Pride Month.

== Personal life ==
Turing has self-identified as homosexual, genderfluid, and feminine, and uses the pronouns he/him and she/her.

== Filmography ==
=== Television / digital series ===
Year	Title	Role	Network
2022	Drag Race Philippines (season 1)	Herself	WOW Presents Plus
2023	Bring Back My Girls	Herself	WOW Presents Plus
2023–2024	Black Rider	Cherry Pie†	GMA Network
