= Jon Santos =

Filipino comedian, actor, and celebrity impersonator

- Education: University of the Philippines Diliman (Economics)
- Occupations: Comedian; actor; celebrity impersonator; writer; television host
- Years active: 1988–present
- Known for: Celebrity impersonation; political satire; theatre
- Spouse: West Stewart (m. 2005)

Jon Santos is a Filipino comedian, actor, writer, television host, and celebrity impersonator. He is known for political satire and impersonations of Philippine political and entertainment figures. His career has included stand-up comedy, television, film, and theatre.

Santos has portrayed public figures including Corazon Aquino, Joseph Estrada, Miriam Defensor Santiago, Gloria Macapagal Arroyo, Rodrigo Duterte, Donald Trump, Vilma Santos, Kris Aquino, and Catriona Gray. His theatrical credits include Priscilla, Queen of the Desert, Rak of Aegis, Ang Huling El Bimbo, and the one-person play Bawat Bonggang Bagay. He has also served as a rotating judge on Drag Race Philippines.

== Early life and education ==
Santos grew up in Cubao, Quezon City, and attended Marist School Marikina. He began impersonating teachers and performing female roles in school productions while he was a student.

He studied economics at the University of the Philippines Diliman, where he became involved in theatre through the UP Repertory Company. His contemporaries in the company included producer Deo Endrinal and playwright and director Floy Quintos. After graduating, Santos worked with former university colleagues as an assistant writer and performer for television sketches.

== Career ==
=== Comedy and impersonation ===
Santos developed his comedy career during the period following the People Power Revolution of 1986, when political satire became more prominent in Philippine entertainment. He has identified comedians Willie Nepomuceno and Tessie Tomas as important mentors. Santos initially performed impressions of Tomas's characters while studying at the University of the Philippines.

Tomas encouraged Santos to pursue comedy professionally after his graduation. Santos held his first solo show in Makati in 1988. He later credited Tomas, Nepomuceno, Nanette Inventor, and Mitch Valdes with helping him enter the entertainment industry.

Santos's repertoire has included satirical versions of presidents, senators, journalists, actors, television personalities, and international political figures. His recurring impersonations have included Vilma Santos, Corazon Aquino, Joseph Estrada, Miriam Defensor Santiago, Gloria Macapagal Arroyo, Kris Aquino, and television journalist Korina Sanchez.

Santos has described his approach to satire as applying jokes to figures from different political parties rather than protecting a particular group. He has said that political comedy can make political issues more accessible, particularly to younger audiences.

In 2019, he marked approximately three decades in entertainment with the live comedy production I Can DOTHIRTY!. The production featured his impersonations of Duterte and Trump and was directed by Michael Williams. Santos co-wrote its script with Enrico Santos and Joel Mercado.

=== Television and film ===
Santos appeared in the 1990 comedy film Tangga and Chos: Beauty Secret Agents. He later performed in the educational television programme Sine'skwela and hosted the cooking programme Sarap TV.

In 2012, he began hosting The Jon Santos Show on the Viva Channel. The programme combined interviews, comedy, music, and Santos's impersonations. It reached its 100th episode in 2014.

In August 2022, Santos joined the first season of Drag Race Philippines as one of its rotating judges. His judging focused on comedy, performance, wit, and storytelling.

=== Theatre ===
In 2014, Santos portrayed Bernadette in the Manila production of Priscilla, Queen of the Desert. He subsequently performed the role during the production's engagement in Singapore.

Santos played Fernan in the fifth run of the Philippine Educational Theater Association's musical Rak of Aegis in 2016. In 2018, he portrayed the older Anthony in the original production of Ang Huling El Bimbo, a musical using the songs of the Eraserheads.

In 2023, Santos began performing in Bawat Bonggang Bagay, Guelan Varela-Luarca's Filipino adaptation of Duncan Macmillan and Jonny Donahoe's Every Brilliant Thing. The interactive one-person play follows an unnamed narrator who makes a list of reasons to live while dealing with a parent's mental illness. The production returned for subsequent runs in 2024 and 2025.

In 2025, Santos portrayed the Boss in a Philippine staging of Side Show, a musical based on the lives of conjoined performers Daisy and Violet Hilton.

=== Selected theatre credits ===
Selected theatre roles
Year	Production	Role	Ref.
2014	Priscilla, Queen of the Desert	Bernadette	
2016	Rak of Aegis	Fernan	
2018	Ang Huling El Bimbo	Older Anthony	
2023–2025	Bawat Bonggang Bagay	Narrator	
2025	Side Show	The Boss	

== Personal life ==
Santos is openly gay and has discussed how appearing in drag formed part of his coming-out experience with his family.

Santos met businessman West Stewart in 2005 through Tessie Tomas. Santos and Stewart married in a civil ceremony at the North York Family Court in Toronto, Canada, on August 24, 2005. Their relationship was also discussed in a 2025 profile of Santos published by Vogue Philippines.
