= Precious Paula Nicole =

Filipino drag queen

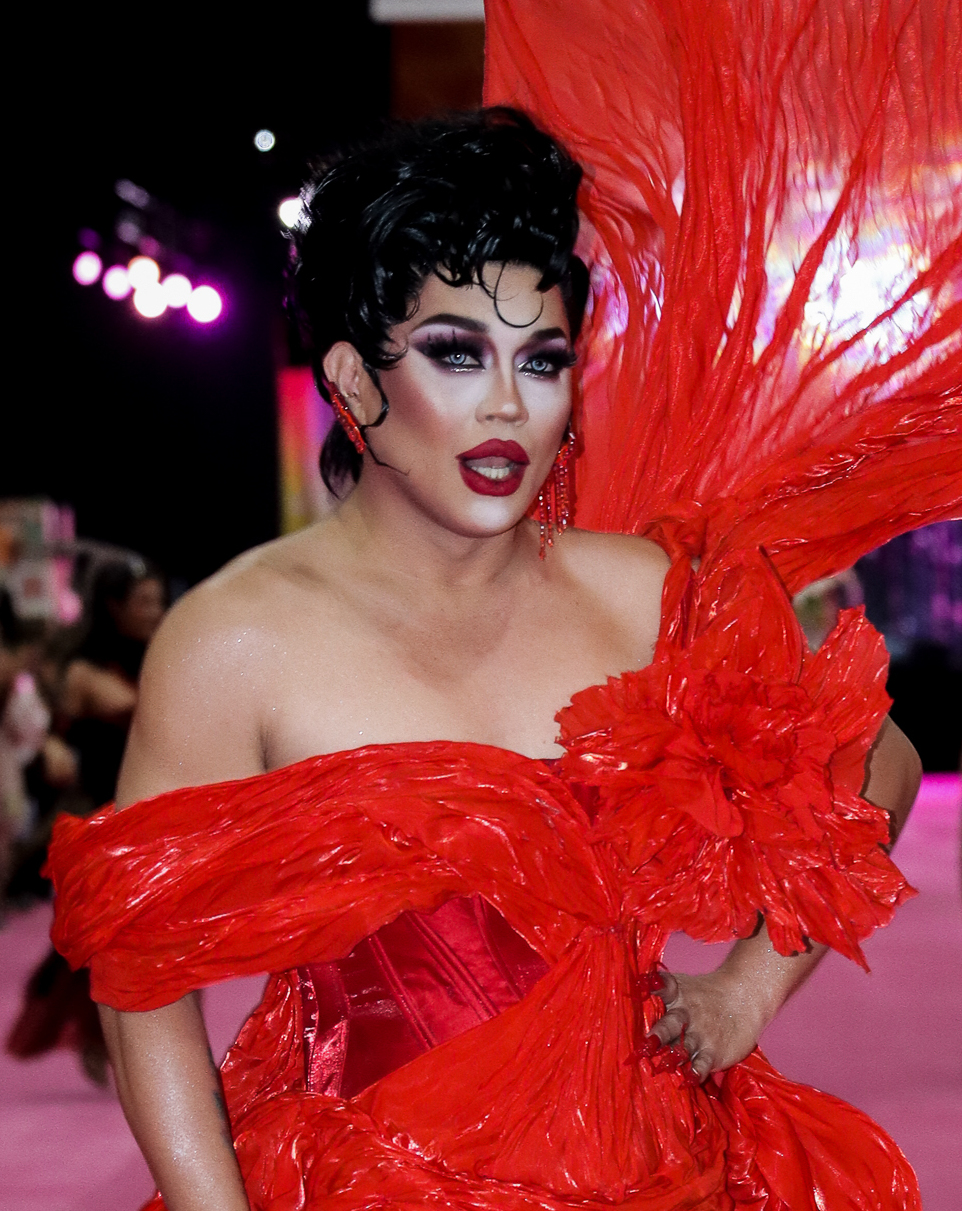
- Precious Paula Nicole at RuPaul's DragCon LA, 2024
- Born: Rodolfo Hontiveros Gabriel II; July 1, 1986 (age 39); Daet, Camarines Norte, Philippines
- Occupations: Drag performer; actor
- Television: Drag Race Philippines (season 1)

Rodolfo Hontiveros Gabriel II (born July 1, 1986), popularly known as Precious Paula Nicole, is a Filipino drag performer and actor. She is best known for winning the inaugural season of Drag Race Philippines. She is a member of the Divine Divas with Brigiding and Viñas DeLuxe. She performs at O Bar and has impersonated Beyoncé, Mariah Carey, and Regine Velasquez.

== Personal life ==
Gabriel was born in Daet, Camarines Norte, Philippines as Rodolfo Hontiveros Gabriel II. Gabriel is bisexual, and uses "the pronoun 'he' out of drag and 'she' when she's on stage".

== Discography ==
=== Singles ===
List of Singles
Title	Year
"Precious Heart"	2025
"Malaya"	2025

== Filmography ==
=== Film ===
Year	Title	Role	Notes	Ref.
2024	Happy (M)other's Day	Dada Dy	An official entry to 2024 The Manila Film Festival (TMFF)	
2025	Sisenta!	Carlo	An official entry to the Puregold Cinepanalo Film Festival 2025	
2025	Lip Sync Assassin	Sampaguita	Lead role; an official entry to the 2025 Cine Pride Film Festival	

=== Television ===
Year	Title	Role	Notes	Ref.
2021	Tropang LOL	Contestant	"LOL Drag Queendom"	
2022	Drag Race Philippines	Contestant	Season 1, Winner (10 episodes)	
2022	Drag Race Philippines: Untucked!	Herself	Season 1 (10 episodes)	
2023	Drag You & Me	Dragona		
2023	Eat Bulaga!	Herself	"Babala! 'Wag Kayong Ganuuun..."	
2023	Bring Back My Girls	Herself	Season 2	
2024	Family Feud	Contestant	Team The Divine Divas (with Brigiding, Viñas DeLuxe, Salmo Nella)	
2025	Rainbow Rumble	Contestant	Season 1 (Ep. 47); Drag Queens (with Brigiding, Viñas DeLuxe, Lady Morgana, Minty Fresh)	
2025	Drag Race Philippines: Slaysian Royale	Judge	Season 1 (2 episodes)	

=== Music videos ===
Title	Year	Director(s)	Ref.
"Paruparo" (with Bini)	2026	Kerbs Balagtas	

== Awards and nominations ==
Name of the award ceremony, year presented, award category, nominee(s) of the award, and the result of the nomination
Award	Year	Category	Nominee(s) / Work(s)	Result	Ref.
Cine Pride Film Festival	2025	Best Lead Performance	Lip Sync Assassin	Won	
Nylon Manila's Big Bold Brave Awards	2023	Gen-Z Approved Drag Queen	Herself	Won	
Nylon Manila's Big Bold Brave Awards	2024	Gen-Z Approved Drag Queen	Herself	Won	
Sinag Maynila Independent Film Festival	2025	Special Citation for Performance in Open Short Film	Lip Sync Assassin	Won	

=== Listicles ===
Name of publisher, name of listicle, year listed, and placement result
Publisher	Listicle	Year	Result	Ref.
Tatler Asia	Gen.T Leaders of Tomorrow	2023	Placed	
