= Brigiding =

Filipino drag performer

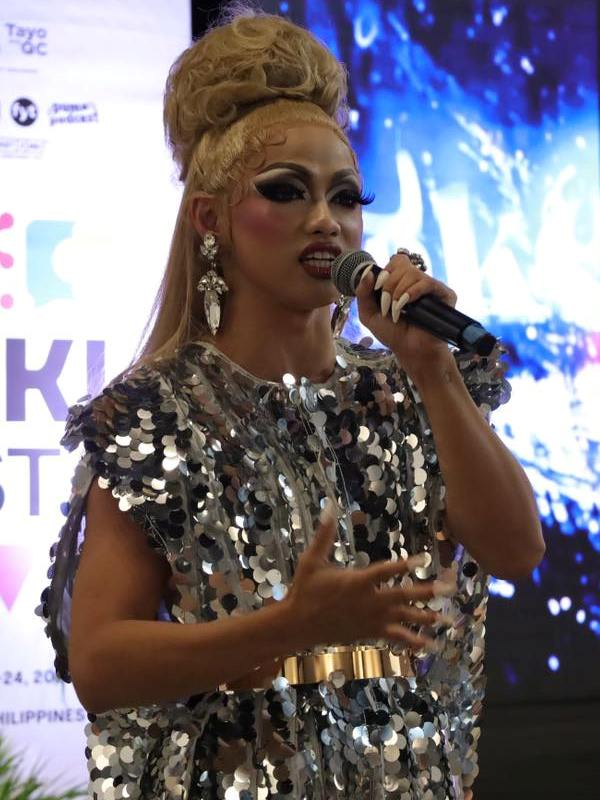
- Brigiding in 2024
- Born: John Philip Aricheta; February 26, 1992 (age 34); Mandaluyong, Metro Manila, Philippines
- Other name: Brigiding "Gigi" Aricheta
- Television: Drag Race Philippines (season 1); Drag Race Philippines: Slaysian Royale (season 1) winner

Brigiding "Gigi" Aricheta, or simply Brigiding, is the stage name of John Philip Aricheta (born February 26, 1992), a Filipino drag performer who competed in season 1 of Drag Race Philippines and was crowned the winner of the inaugural Drag Race Philippines: Slaysian Royale. She is a member of the Divine Divas with Precious Paula Nicole and Viñas DeLuxe.

== Career ==
Drag performer Brigiding competed on season 1 of Drag Race Philippines. Her impersonation of Elizabeth Ramsey for the Snatch Game challenged placed her in the bottom two. She tied in a lip sync against Minty Fresh to "Amakabogera" by Maymay Entrata, and both were allowed to remain in the competition. Brigiding placed sixth overall.

Since the show, she has performed with her fellow contestants Precious Paula Nicole and Viñas DeLuxe as the Divine Divas. The trio also appeared in a 2023 episode of Drag You and Me, as contestants in the Manila Drag Supreme contest. In 2022, Brigiding performed alongside fellow contestants Corazon and Turing at Kroma Entertainment's first in-person event, Kroma Overload. Brigiding represented the Philippines in a Nivea campaign in 2023.

== Personal life ==
Brigiding is from Mandaluyong, Metro Manila. She is queer and uses he/him pronouns when out of drag and she/her while in drag. Brigiding is the "drag daughter" of DeeDee Marié Holliday, who competed in season 2 of Drag Race Philippines. After season 1 of Drag Race Philippines, Brigiding established her own drag family, founding the House of Ding. She serves as the "drag mother" of Zymba Ding, who also competed on season 3 of Drag Race Philippines. On April 24, 2024, Brigiding announced her induction into the drag family of Sasha Velour on her social media account.

== Filmography ==
=== Television ===
Year	Title	Network/Platform	Role	Notes
2015	Oh My G!	ABS-CBN	Rene	
2022	Drag Race Philippines	HBO Go, WOW Presents Plus	Contestant	Season 1, 6th place
2022	Drag Race Philippines: Untucked!	HBO Go, WOW Presents Plus	Herself	Season 1
2023	Drag You & Me	IWant	Michael Romero/Lila Gumamela	
2024	Family Feud	GMA Network	Contestant	Ep. 503: Team The Divine Divas (with Precious Paula Nicole, Viñas DeLuxe, Salmo Nella)
2025	Rainbow Rumble	Kapamilya Channel	Contestant	Season 1, Ep. 47: Drag Queens (with Precious Paula Nicole, Viñas DeLuxe, Lady Morgana, Minty Fresh)
2025	Drag Race Philippines: Slaysian Royale	WOW Presents Plus	Contestant	Season 1, Winner

=== Music videos ===
Year	Title	Artist	Role	Ref.
2014	"Nandito Lang Ako"	Ai-Ai delas Alas	Cameo	
2015	"Harana Na Na Na"	Janella Salvador	Cameo	
2017	"At Ang Hirap"	Angeline Quinto	Cameo	
2023	"Handog ng Pilipino sa Mundo"	Jim Paredes	Cameo	
2024	"Oh, Divine Diva"	Divine Divas	As part of the trio	
2026	"Paruparo"	Divine Divas	As part of the trio	
