= Xilhouete =

Drag performer

- Born: Wong Israel; 1987 or 1988 (age 38–39); Cabanatuan, Nueva Ecija, Philippines
- Television: Drag Race Philippines (season 1)
- Website: xilhouete.com

Wong Israel, known professionally as Xilhouete, is a Filipino drag performer. They are best known for competing on the first season of Drag Race Philippines.

== Career ==
Xilhouete is a drag performer who has also been described as an artist, a director, and an entrepreneur.

Xilhouete competed on the first season of Drag Race Philippines. John Legaspi of the Manila Bulletin wrote, "On the first day of the competition, the feud between Marina Summers and her former drag mom Xilhouete was already put to the table, providing many uses for the shade sound effects throughout the season." Josiah Antonio of ABS-CBN News said Xilhouete had a "meltdown" after receiving negative criticism from judges in the third episode's girl group challenge. Xilhouete impersonated Vicki Belo for the Snatch Game challenge. She won two challenges and defeated Minty Fresh in a lip-sync battle to Vernie Varga's "You'll Always Be My Number One". Xilhouete was a finalist but lost to Marina Summers in the semi-finals.

In 2022, Xilhouete was featured in a Netflix advertisement for the series Wednesday. She also appeared in a parody video "Pa Drag Race Den" with Maricel Soriano. Xilhouete appears in the 2023 summer MMFF film Here Comes the Groom and was nominated for best supporting actor.

== Personal life ==
Originally from Cabanatuan, Nueva Ecija, Xilhouete lives in Quezon City. As of 2022, Xilhouete was partnered and had a dog; both appeared on an episode of Drag Race Philippines: Untucked during Xilhouete's time on Drag Race. Xilhouete has been a co-owner and creative director of a bar in Manila called Nectar Nightclub.

According to Jove Moya of Tatler Asia, "Many queens consider Xilhouete a veteran performer; she is often regarded as a 'drag mother' who seeks to celebrate the legacy of her co-performers." Xilhouete's "drag daughters" include fellow contestants Marina Summers and Minty Fresh.

On the origins of their drag name and gender identity, Xilhouete has said: "At first, my name was inspired by my love for film. Then the meaning became profound as I changed the spelling from silhouette to xilhouete. Xilhouete is a representation of all living and non-living things, however, you want to see her/him. In short, I do not conform to gender. I am just Xilhouete, I am my own."

== Filmography ==
=== Film ===
| Year | Title | Role | Notes | Ref. |
|---|---|---|---|---|
| 2023 | Here Comes the Groom | Wanda Wong | Nominated as Best Supporting Actor 1st Metro Manila Summer Film Festival | |

=== Television ===
| Year | Title | Role | Notes | Ref. |
|---|---|---|---|---|
| 2022 | Drag Race Philippines (season 1) | Contestant | Finalist | |
| 2022 | Drag Race Philippines: Untucked! | Contestant | Finalist | |
| 2024 | Rainbow Rumble | Contestant | | |
| 2025 | Roja | Rolando "Mama Ona" Chan | Supporting role | |

== See also ==
- List of people from Quezon City
