= Viñas DeLuxe =

Filipino drag performer

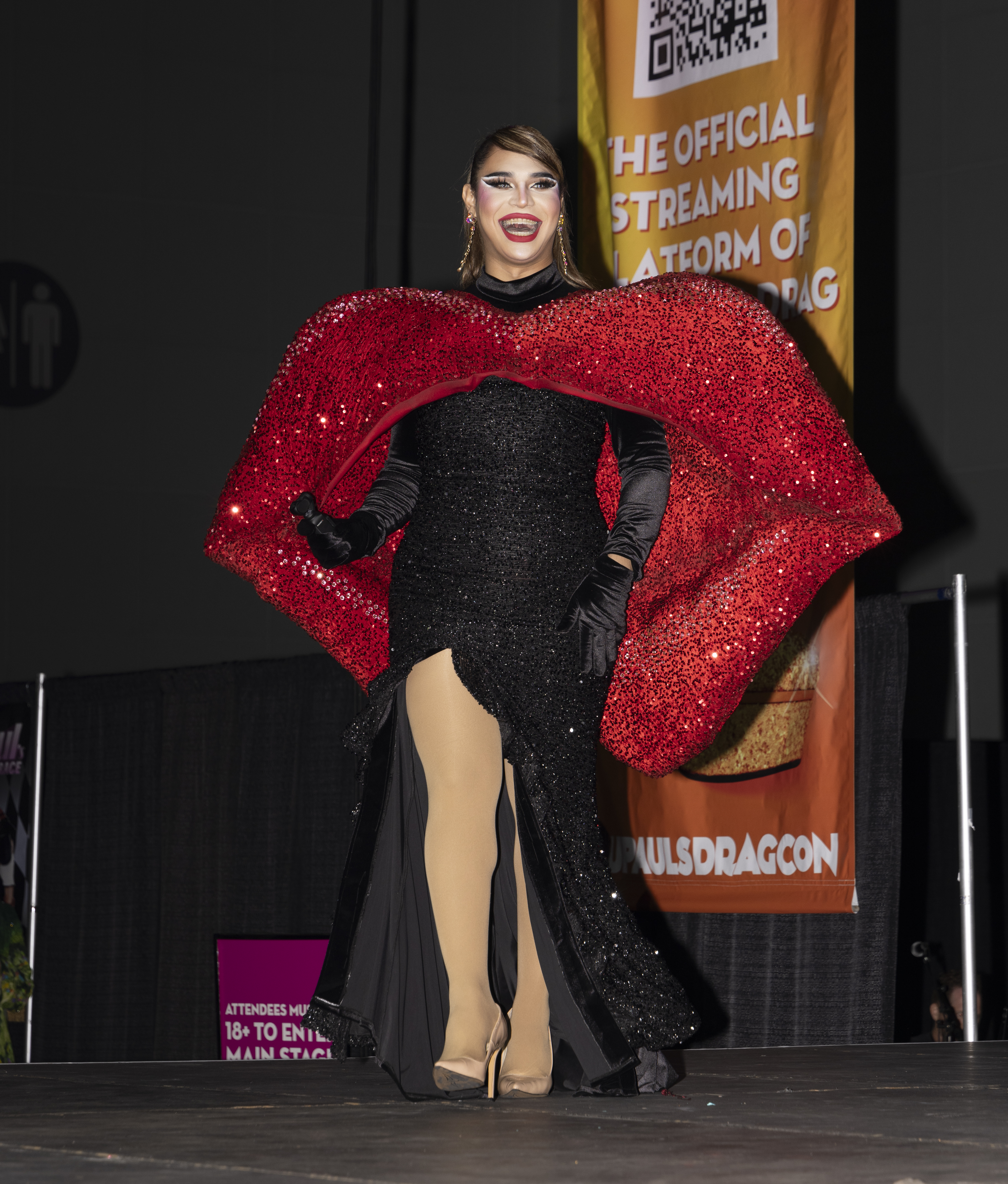
- Viñas Deluxe at RuPaul's DragCon LA, 2023
- Born: Christian Ric Viñas; Bulacan, Central Luzon, Philippines
- Television: Drag Race Philippines (season 1); Drag Race Philippines: Slaysian Royale (season 1)

Viñas DeLuxe is the stage name of Christian Ric Viñas, a Filipino drag performer who competed in season 1 of Drag Race Philippines and season 1 of Drag Race Philippines: Slaysian Royale, finishing in seventh place and as the runner-up, respectively. She is a member of the Divine Divas with Precious Paula Nicole and Brigiding.

== Early life ==
Viñas DeLuxe was born in Bulacan.

== Career ==
Viñas DeLuxe is a drag performer and hairdresser. She has also been described as an events host, a vlogger, a comedian, and the chief executive officer of Deluxe Wigs.

Viñas DeLuxe competed on season 1 of Drag Race Philippines. She performed at RuPaul's DragCon LA in 2023, where she impersonated Mariah Carey.

Viñas DeLuxe's debut single "I'm Feeling Sexy Tonight" was released in 2023, and received a music video.

In 2023, Viñas hosted the drag competition Bunganga Battle Royale. Zymba Ding won the contest. Sofia Trazona also competed.

== Personal life ==
Viñas DeLuxe is the "drag mother" of Tiny Deluxe, who competed on season 2 of Drag Race Philippines.

== Filmography ==
=== Television ===
- Drag Race Philippines (season 1)
- Bring Back My Girls (2023)
- Drag You & Me (2023)
- Tongue Thai'd (2025)
- Drag Race Philippines: Slaysian Royale

=== Web series ===
Year	Title	Role
2024	Add to Cart (Drag Race Philippines season 3)	Themself
2025—2026	Add to Cart (Drag Race Philippines Slaysian Royale)	Themself

=== Music videos ===
Title	Year	Director(s)	Ref.
"Paruparo" (with Bini)	2026	Kerbs Balagtas	
