= Eva Le Queen =

Filipino drag performer

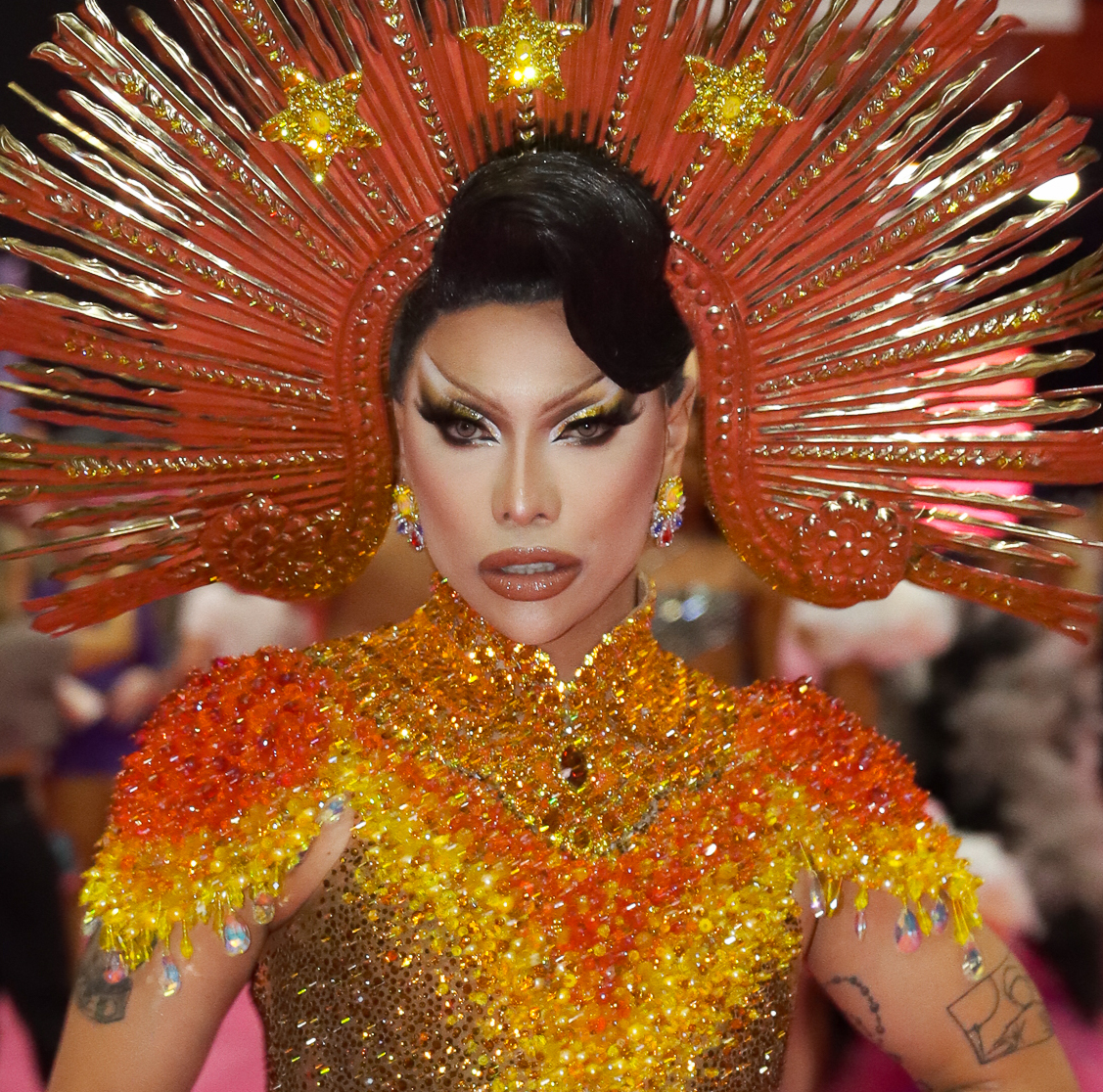
- Eva Le Queen at RuPaul's DragCon LA, 2024
- Born: Jace Lamban; October 29, 1987 (age 38)
- Occupation: Drag queen

Eva Le Queen is the stage name of Jace Lamban, a Filipino drag performer most known for competing on season 1 of Drag Race Philippines. She also appeared in The Write One! She competed on RuPaul's Drag Race Global All Stars.

== Education ==
Before starting drag, Lamban received a marketing degree in Singapore.

== Career ==
Eva Le Queen is a former project manager and human resources consultant who created the drag entertainment company Drag Playhouse PH. She competed on season 1 of Drag Race Philippines was a finalist and finished tied for 3rd place. She competed on RuPaul's Drag Race Global All Stars, placing tenth overall.

== Discography ==
=== Featured singles ===
Title	Year	Album
"Pop Off Ate - Floxbomb Girls Version" (The Cast of Drag Race Philippines)	2022	Non-album single
"Everybody Say Love (fresh M-E-a-T K-Pop Mix)" (The Cast of RuPaul's Drag Race Global All Stars)	2024	Non-album single

== Filmography ==
- Drag Race Philippines (2022) - 3rd/4th place
- Bring Back My Girls (2023)
- The Write One (2023)
- RuPaul's Drag Race Global All Stars (2024) - 10th place
