= Patrick Starrr =

American make-up artist

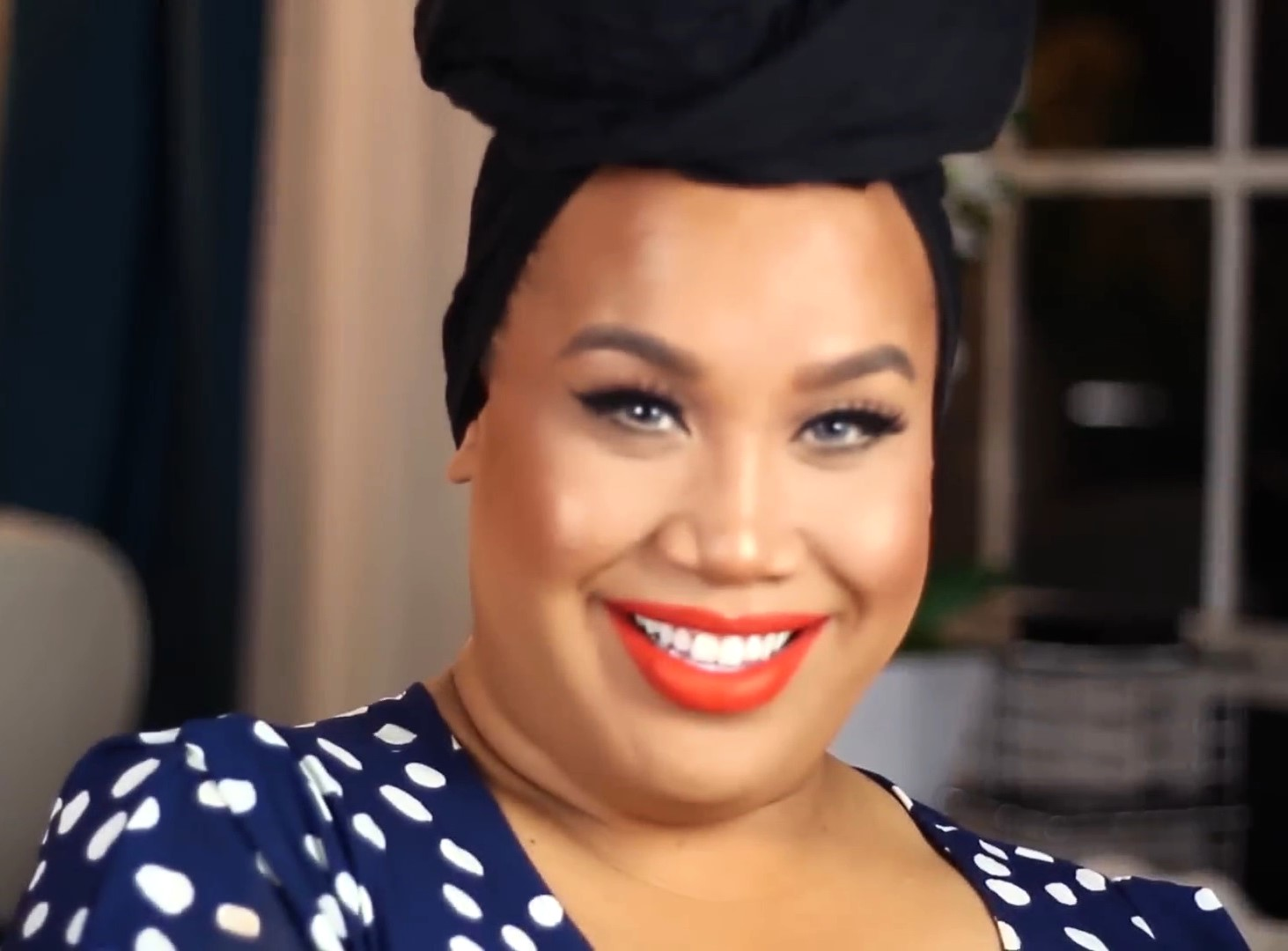
- Starrr in 2016
- Born: Patrick Simondac; November 11, 1989 (age 37); Orlando, Florida, U.S.

YouTube information
- Channel: PatrickStarrr
- Years active: 2013–present
- Genres: Makeup; Beauty
- Subscribers: 4.79 million
- Views: 520.6 million

Patrick Simondac (born November 11, 1989), known professionally as Patrick Starrr, is an American make-up artist and social media influencer. He has also been described as a musical and business mogul.

== Early life ==
Starrr was raised in Orlando, Florida, the son of Filipino immigrants Arnulfo and Lenee Simondac. He grew up Catholic. Starrr began to suffer from hair loss at age 14, and so began to wear head-wraps and turbans to compensate. Eventually, he lost all hair on his head. Starrr worked at a makeup store after graduating high school, before beginning his online career.

== Career ==
In February 2013, Starrr uploaded his first YouTube video. He mainly posts makeup tutorials on the channel. His videos soon gained virality and has led to him collaborating with celebrities such as Kim Kardashian, Katy Perry, and Madelaine Petsch.

Starrr launched a makeup line in collaboration with MAC Cosmetics in 2017, and a clothing collection in 2021. He co-founded One/Size, which is owned by Luxury Brand Partners. The brand expanded its operations to Southeast Asia in 2020.

Starrr is the host of the interview podcast Say Yas to the Guest and was a guest judge on the reality competition series Drag Race Philippines, the prize package for which includes a one-year supply of ONE/SIZE Beauty Cosmetics from Starrr. Starrr has also created makeup tutorials featuring former Drag Race contestants.

In September 2017, Starrr won the "Beauty" category at that year's Streamy Awards. Two years later, he won the "Fashion" category at the 9th Streamy Awards. In 2020, he partnered with Disney to release a makeup line. Starrr also partnered with Jools Lebron in May 2023 in a beauty campaign.

== Personal life ==
Starrr is gay and has supported businesses which cater to LGBTQ+ people. He currently resides in Los Angeles. By 2026, he had amassed roughly 4.1 million followers on Instagram and 4.78 million subscribers on YouTube. Starrr continues to wear turbans in his adult life, despite now feeling confident in having no hair. He considers this an iconic part of his online brand.
