= Hana Beshie =

Filipino drag performer

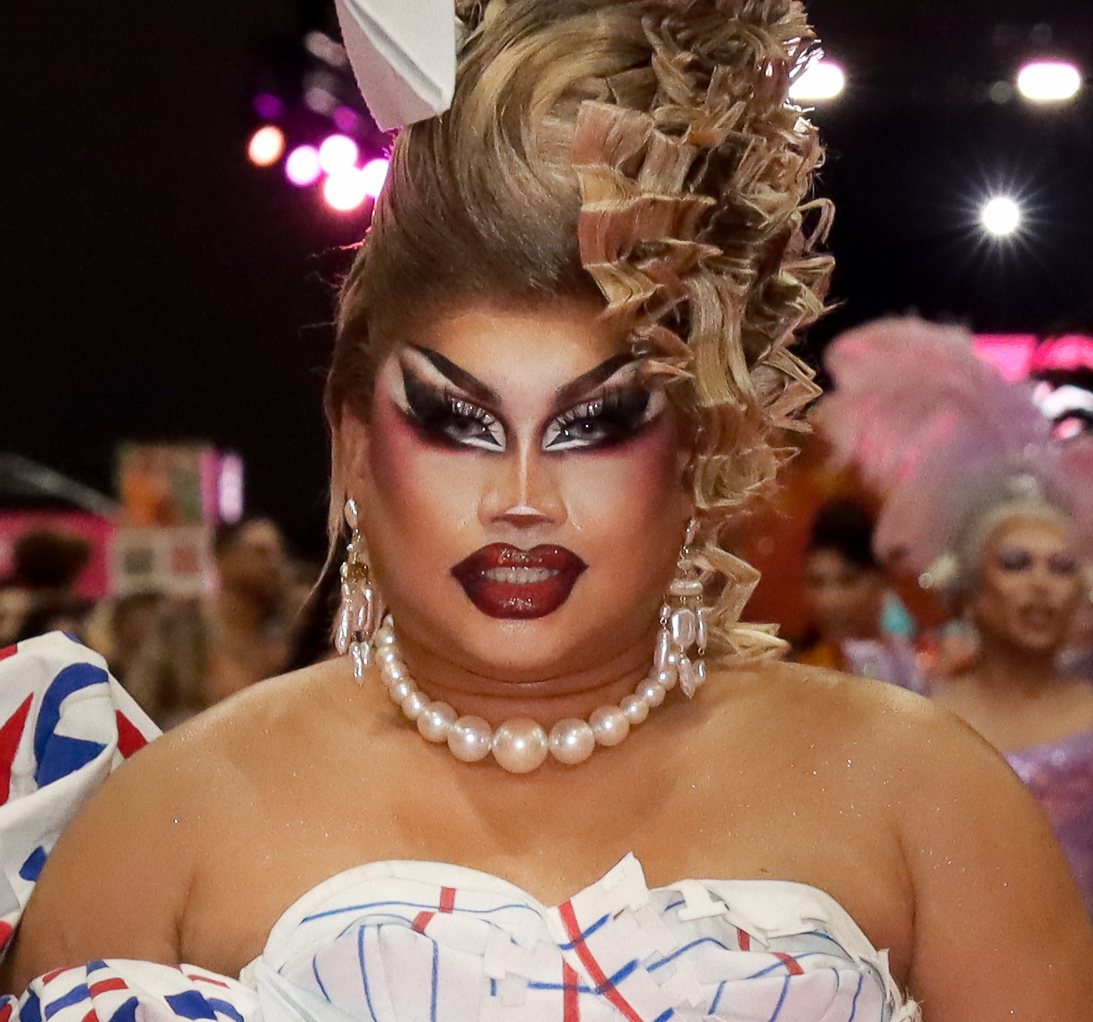
- Hana Beshie at RuPaul's DragCon LA, 2024
- Born: AJ Asi
- Occupation: Drag queen
- Television: Drag Race Philippines (season 2)

Hana Beshie is the stage name of AJ Asi, a Filipino drag performer who competed on season 2 of Drag Race Philippines.

== Career ==
Asi's drag persona is Hana Beshie. She competed on season 2 of Drag Race Philippines, and appeared on the companion series Untucked. Hana Beshie impersonated Jessica Soho for the Snatch Game challenge, and was named Miss Congeniality.

Outside of drag, Asi is an architect based in Cagayan de Oro.

== Personal life ==
Prior to competing on Drag Race, Asi had not told his family about his interest in drag. His parents appeared in a video message during an episode of Untucked.

== Filmography ==
- Drag Race Philippines Season 2 (2023)
- Drag Race Philippines: Untucked! (2023)
- Bring Back My Girls (2025)
- B is for Bonding (2025–present)
