= Drag Race Philippines season 1 =

2022 season of television series

Drag Race Philippines
- Season 1
- Promotional poster for season one
- Hosted by: Paolo Ballesteros
- Judges: Paolo Ballesteros; Jiggly Caliente; KaladKaren; Rajo Laurel; BJ Pascual; Jon Santos
- No. of contestants: 12
- Winner: Precious Paula Nicole
- Runner-up: Marina Summers
- Miss Congeniality: Lady Morgana
- No. of episodes: 10

Release
- Original network: Discovery+ and HBO Go (Philippines); WOW Presents Plus (International)
- Original release: August 17 – October 12, 2022

Season chronology
- Next → Season 2

The first season of Drag Race Philippines premiered on August 17, 2022. The cast was announced on July 27, 2022. The winner of the first season of Drag Race Philippines was Precious Paula Nicole, with Marina Summers as the runner-up.

Casting occurred in middle 2021 with production starting in early 2022. On July 12, 2022, actor, comedian, and drag queen Paolo Ballesteros was confirmed as the host and main judge. On July 20, 2022, RuPaul's Drag Race season 4 and All Stars season 6 contestant Jiggly Caliente and television personality and impersonator KaladKaren were confirmed as main judges. And lastly, on August 11, 2022, photographer BJ Pascual, fashion designer Rajo Laurel and actor and comedian Jon Santos were announced as the alternating judges for the season. The winner of the season received a cash prize of ₱1,000,000, a years supply of makeup from ONE/SIZE cosmetics and a crown and scepter.

The season consisted of ten episodes ranging from the 70 to 90 minute mark.

== Contestants ==
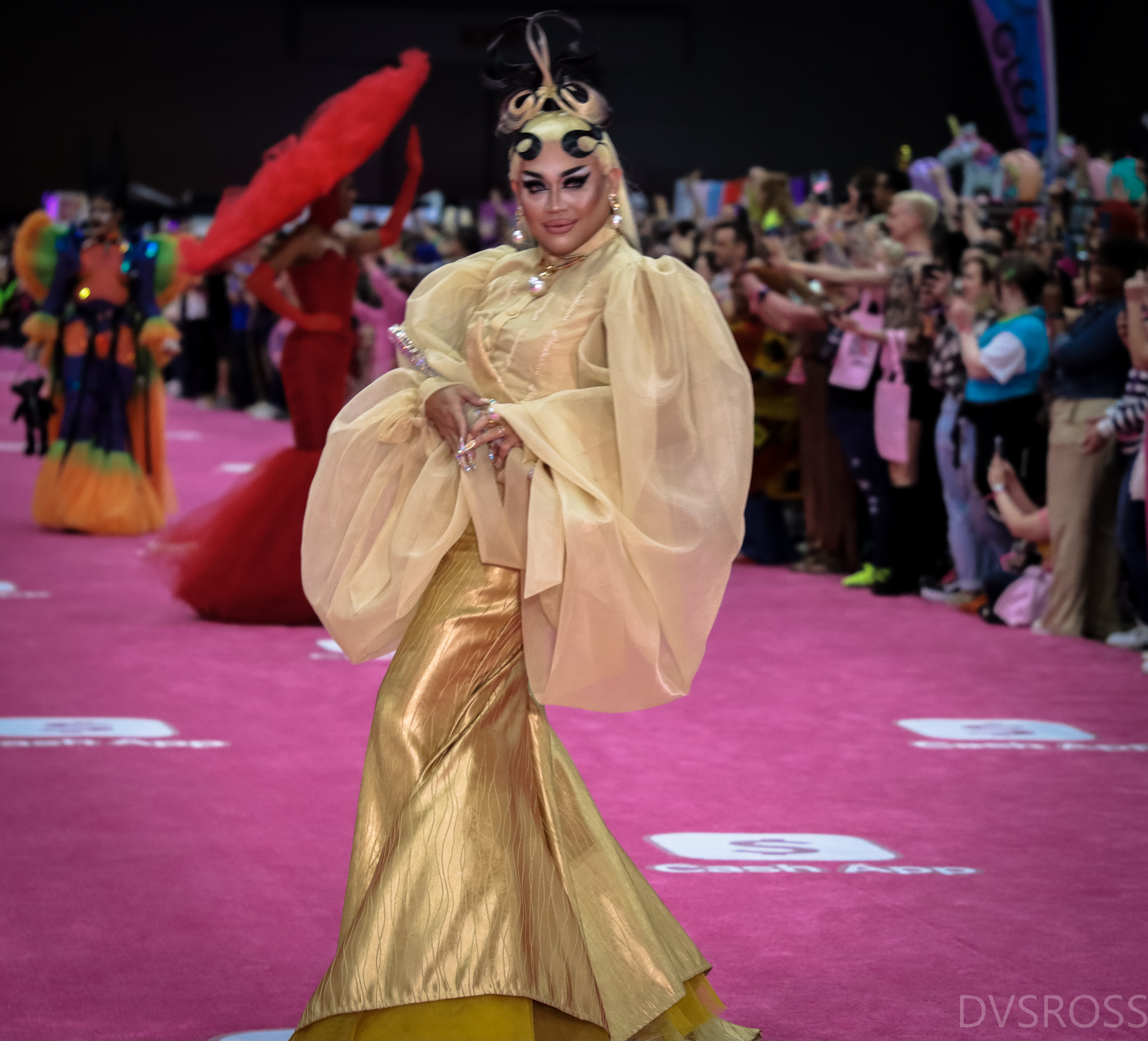
Season 1 winner Precious Paula Nicole

Drag Race Philippines season 1 contestants and their backgrounds (Note: All ages, names, with hometowns, and outcome are stated at time of filming.)
Contestant	Age	Hometown	Outcome
Precious Paula Nicole	35	Daet, Camarines Norte	Winner
Marina Summers	26	Makati, Metro Manila	Runner-up
Eva Le Queen	33	Marikina, Metro Manila	3rd place
Xilhouete	34	Cabanatuan, Nueva Ecija	3rd place
Minty Fresh	31	Quezon City, Metro Manila	5th place
Brigiding	29	Mandaluyong, Metro Manila	6th place
Viñas DeLuxe	25	San Jose del Monte, Bulacan	7th place
Lady Morgana (Note: Lady Morgana Perez is referred to as Lady Morgana on the show.)	30	Davao City, Davao del Sur	8th place (Note: Lady Morgana was voted Miss Congeniality.)
Turing (Note: Turing Quinto is referred to as Turing on the show.)	29	Cainta, Rizal	9th place
Gigi Era	38	Melbourne, Australia	10th place
Corazon (Note: Corazon Filipinas is referred to as Corazon on the show.)	34	Bolinao, Pangasinan	11th place
Prince (Note: Prince Marell is referred to as Prince on the show.)	25	Calumpit, Bulacan	12th place

Footnotes

== Contestant progress ==
Legend:

Precious Paula Nicole won Drag Race Philippines season 1.
Marina Summers was the runner-up.
Lady Morgana was voted Miss Congeniality (Miss C) by fellow contestants.
WIN indicates that the contestant won the challenge.
SAFE indicates that the contestant was declared safe by the judges.
BTM (Bottom) indicates that the contestant was up for elimination.
ELIM (Eliminated) indicates that the contestant was eliminated.
Guest indicates that the contestant returned as a guest.

Contestants progress with placements in each episode
Contestant	Episode									
Contestant	1	2	3	4	5	6	7	8	9	10
Precious Paula Nicole	SAFE	SAFE	SAFE	WIN	SAFE	SAFE	SAFE	SAFE	SAFE	Winner
Marina Summers	SAFE	SAFE	SAFE	SAFE	WIN	SAFE	SAFE	SAFE	WIN	Runner-up
Eva Le Queen	SAFE	SAFE	SAFE	SAFE	SAFE	SAFE	BTM	SAFE	SAFE	Eliminated
Xilhouete	SAFE	SAFE	BTM	SAFE	SAFE	WIN	SAFE	WIN	BTM	Eliminated
Minty Fresh	WIN	SAFE	SAFE	SAFE	SAFE	BTM	WIN	BTM	ELIM	Guest
Brigiding	SAFE	SAFE	SAFE	SAFE	BTM	BTM	SAFE	ELIM		Guest
Viñas DeLuxe	SAFE	WIN	SAFE	SAFE	SAFE	SAFE	ELIM			Guest
Lady Morgana	BTM	SAFE	SAFE	BTM	ELIM					Miss C
Turing	SAFE	BTM	WIN	ELIM						Guest
Gigi Era	SAFE	SAFE	ELIM							Guest
Corazon	SAFE	ELIM								Guest
Prince	ELIM									Guest

== Lip syncs ==
Legend:

The contestant was eliminated after their first time in the bottom.
The contestant was eliminated after their second time in the bottom.
The contestant was eliminated after their third time in the bottom.
The contestant won the first round of the Lip Sync Smackdown for the Crown and advanced to the second.
The contestant won the second round of the Lip Sync Smackdown for the Crown and was declared the winner of the season.

Episode	Contestants			Song	Eliminated
1	Lady Morgana	vs.	Prince	"Tala" (Sarah Geronimo)	Prince
2	Corazon	vs.	Turing	"I'm Feeling Sexy Tonight" (Chona Cruz)	Corazon
3	Gigi Era	vs.	Xilhouete	"Glamazon" (RuPaul)	Gigi Era
4	Lady Morgana	vs.	Turing	"Shine" (Regine Velasquez)	Turing
5	Brigiding	vs.	Lady Morgana	"Ate Sandali" (Maris Racal)	Lady Morgana
6	Brigiding	vs.	Minty Fresh	"Amakabogera" (Maymay Entrata)	None
7	Eva Le Queen	vs.	Viñas DeLuxe	"Born Naked" (RuPaul ft. Clairy Browne)	Viñas DeLuxe
8	Brigiding	vs.	Minty Fresh	"Dyosa" (Yumi Lacsamana)	Brigiding
9	Minty Fresh	vs.	Xilhouete	"You'll Always Be My Number One" (Vernie Varga)	Minty Fresh
Episode	Contestants			Song	Winner
10	Eva Le Queen	vs.	Precious Paula Nicole	"Sissy That Walk" (RuPaul)	Precious Paula Nicole
10	Marina Summers	vs.	Xilhouete	"Call Me Mother" (RuPaul)	Marina Summers
10	Marina Summers	vs.	Precious Paula Nicole	"Sirena" (Gloc-9 ft. Ebe Dancel)	Precious Paula Nicole

== Guest judges ==
Listed in chronological order:

- Pops Fernandez, singer, entertainer, entrepreneur, TV host and actress
- Pokwang, comedian, actress, television host and singer
- Nadine Lustre, actress, singer, and dancer
- Regine Velasquez-Alcasid, singer, actress, host, and record producer
- Pia Wurtzbach, model, actress and Miss Universe 2015
- Patrick Starrr, makeup artist, digital influencer and entrepreneur
- Boy Abunda, professor, television host, publicist and talent manager

=== Special guests ===
Guests who appeared in episodes, but did not judge on the main stage.

Episode 3:

- Moophs (musician, producer, songwriter and DJ)

Episode 4 and 5:

- Douglas Nierras (artistic director and choreographer)

Episode 6:

- Jojie Dingcong (businessman, talent manager and television personality)

Episode 10:

- Pia Wurtzbach (model, actress and Miss Universe 2015)

== Episodes ==
No. overall	No. in season	Title	Original release date
1	1	"Mabu-Heeey!"	August 17, 2022
Twelve queens enter the workroom. For the first mini-challenge, the queens do a Dragna superhero inspired photoshoot. Marina Summers wins the mini-challenge. For the main challenge, the queens perform a talent show in front of the judges.: Brigiding – Magic show; Corazon – Barangayan dance; Eva Le Queen – Sexy spoken poetry; Gigi Era – Risque dance; Lady Morgana – News reporting skit; Marina Summers – Original song and dance; Minty Fresh – Original song and dance; Precious Paula Nicole – Folk dance; Prince – Burlesque dance; Turing – Contemporary dance; Viñas DeLuxe – Comedy act; Xilhouete – Art performance; On the runway, category is Ter-No, She Betta Don't! Eva Le Queen, Marina Summers, Minty Fresh, Turing and Viñas DeLuxe receive positive critiques, with Minty Fresh winning the challenge. Lady Morgana, Prince and Xilhouete receive negative critiques, with Xilhouete being safe. Lady Morgana and Prince lip-sync to "Tala" by Sarah Geronimo. Lady Morgana wins the lip sync and Prince is the first queen to sashay away.: Guest Judge: Pops Fernandez; Alternating Judge: BJ Pascual; Mini-Challenge: Dragna superhero inspired photoshoot; Mini-Challenge Winner: Marina Summers; Mini-Challenge Prize: A ₱20,000 cash tip; Main Challenge: Perform a talent show in front of the judges; Runway Theme: Ter-No, She Betta Don't!; Challenge Winner: Minty Fresh; Challenge Prize: A ₱80,000 cash tip; Bottom Two: Lady Morgana and Prince; Lip-Sync Song: "Tala" by Sarah Geronimo; Eliminated: Prince; Farewell Message: "Oh well Blast off bitches! 🪐 XOXO, Prince ♡"
2	2	"Sagalamazon"	August 17, 2022
For this week's mini-challenge, the queens play The Hard Greasy Pole Game, in which they must climb up a greasy pole to reach a flag at the top in the fastest time. Corazon wins the mini-challenge. For the main challenge, the queens create a look and arch inspired by the Flores de Mayo celebration and Sagala pageantry. On the runway, category is Sagalamazon. Minty Fresh, Precious Paula Nicole and Viñas DeLuxe receive positive critiques, with Viñas DeLuxe winning the challenge. Corazon, Gigi Era and Turing receive negative critiques, with Gigi Era being safe. Corazon and Turing lip-sync to "I'm Feeling Sexy Tonight" by Chona Cruz.: Guest Judge: Pokwang; Alternating Judge: Rajo Laurel; Mini-Challenge: The Hard Greasy Pole Game; Mini-Challenge Winner: Corazon; Mini-Challenge Prize: A ₱20,000 cash tip; Main Challenge: Create a look and arch inspired by the Flores de Mayo celebration and Sagala pageantry; Runway Theme: Sagalamazon; Challenge Winner: Viñas DeLuxe; Challenge Prize: A ₱80,000 cash tip and a custom couture gown from the House of Laurel; Bottom Two: Corazon and Turing; Lip-Sync Song: "I'm Feeling Sexy Tonight" by Chona Cruz; Eliminated: Corazon; Farewell Message: "Mga cheche... Mahal ko kayo!!! See you soonest. At least I'm not the porkshop. Your Aswang Queen, Corazon..." ("Girls... I love all of you!!! See you soonest. At least I'm not the porkshop. Your Evil Queen Corazon...")
3	3	"Pop Off Ate!"	August 24, 2022
For this week's mini-challenge, the queens vote for their drag president in a Drag Race Special Ru-election. Precious Paula Nicole is elected as the drag president, ranking first in the voting polls. For the main challenge, the queens write, record, and perform verses to "Pop Off Ate (Pop Off Sis)".: Team Flexbomb Girls: Brigiding, Eva Le Queen, Lady Morgana, Marina Summers and Turing; Team Pink Pussy Energy: Gigi Era, Minty Fresh, Precious Paula Nicole, Viñas DeLuxe and Xilhouete; On the runway, category is Shake, Rattle and Rampa (Shake, Rattle and Runway). Team Flexbomb Girls is the winning team, with Turing winning the challenge. Team Pink Pussy Energy is the losing team. Gigi Era, Minty Fresh and Xilhouete receive negative critiques, with Minty Fresh being safe. Gigi Era and Xilhouete lip-sync to "Glamazon" by RuPaul. Xilhouete wins the lip-sync and Gigi Era sashays away.: Guest Judge: Nadine Lustre; Alternating Judge: Rajo Laurel; Mini-Challenge: Drag Race Special Ru-lection; Mini-Challenge Winner: Precious Paula Nicole; Mini-Challenge Prize: A ₱20,000 cash tip; Main Challenge: Write, record, and perform verses to "Pop Off Ate (Pop Off Sis)"; Runway Theme: Shake, Rattle and Rampa (Shake, Rattle and Runway); Challenge Winner: Turing; Challenge Prize: A ₱80,000 cash tip; Bottom Two: Gigi Era and Xilhouete; Lip-Sync Song: "Glamazon" by RuPaul; Eliminated: Gigi Era; Farewell Message: "Girls, I'm just a phone call away. Fuck you all. Love, Gigi Era"
4	4	"OPM Divas: The Rusical"	August 31, 2022
For this week's mini-challenge, the queens play a game of Ten-Twenty Talon Becky (Chinese Garter Game). Eva Le Queen wins the mini-challenge. For the main challenge, the queens perform in OPM Divas: The Rusical.: Brigiding plays Jaya; Eva Le Queen plays Jolina Magdangal; Lady Morgana plays Lea Salonga; Marina Summers plays Sarah Geronimo; Minty Fresh plays Moira Dela Torre; Precious Paula Nicole plays Regine Velasquez; Turing plays Sharon Cuneta; Viñas DeLuxe plays Zsa Zsa Padilla; Xilhouette plays Pilita Corrales; On the runway, category is Perlas Ng Sinilangan (Pearl of the Orient Seas). Marina Summers, Precious Paula Nicole, Viñas DeLuxe and Xilhouete receive positive critiques with Precious Paula Nicole winning the challenge. Lady Morgana and Turing receive negative critiques and are announced as the bottom two. They lip-sync to "Shine" by Regine Velasquez. Lady Morgana wins the lip sync and Turing sashays away.: Guest Judge: Regine Velasquez; Alternating Judge: Jon Santos; Mini-Challenge: Ten-Twenty Talon Becky (Chinese Garter Game); Mini-Challenge Winner: Eva Le Queen; Mini-Challenge Prize: A ₱20,000 cash tip; Main Challenge: OPM Divas: The Rusical; Runway Theme: Perlas Ng Silanganan (Pearl of the Orient Seas); Challenge Winner: Precious Paula Nicole; Challenge Prize: A ₱80,000 cash tip; Bottom Two: Lady Morgana and Turing; Lip-Sync Song: "Shine" by Regine Velasquez; Eliminated: Turing; Farewell Message: "If you have a bad day, Doesn't mean you have a bad Drag! Please pray for the group, always. Let's Do this! – Ate Turs"
5	5	"Miss Shutacca"	September 7, 2022
For this week's main challenge, the queens compete in the Miss Shutacca Queen Beauty Pageant (Miss Bitchy Queen Beauty Pageant).: Brigiding – Miss Jologs (Miss Tacky); Eva Le Queen – Miss Stateside; Lady Morgana – Miss Santa Santita (Miss Goody Two-Shoes); Marina Summers – Miss Makyondi (Miss Skanky); Minty Fresh – Miss Bitchesa (Miss Biyatch); Precious Paula Nicole – Miss Shunga (Miss Airhead); Viñas DeLuxe – Miss Tarantela (Miss Nervous); Xilhouete – Miss Kabogera (Miss Upstager); On the runway, category is Pink Pak Boom. Marina Summers, Precious Paula Nicole and Xilhouete receive positive critiques, with Marina Summers winning the challenge. Brigiding, Lady Morgana and Viñas DeLuxe receive negative critiques, with Viñas DeLuxe being safe. Brigiding and Lady Morgana lip-sync to "Ate Sandali" by Maris Racal. Brigiding wins the lip sync and Lady Morgana sashays away.: Guest Judge: Pia Wurtzbach; Alternating Judge: Rajo Laurel; Main Challenge: Compete in the Miss Shutacca Queen Beauty Pageant (Miss Bitchy Queen Beauty Pageant); Runway Theme: Pink Pak Boom; Challenge Winner: Marina Summers; Challenge Prize: A ₱80,000 cash tip; Bottom Two: Brigiding and Lady Morgana; Lip-Sync Song: "Ate Sandali" by Maris Racal; Eliminated: Lady Morgana; Farewell Message: "Girls, Salamat sa lahat, Always believe in yourself. Dalaygooooooon. Love Love Love Lady Morgana" ("Girls, thank you for everything, always believe in yourself. (You're) praiseworthy. Love Love Love Lady Morgana")
6	6	"Snatch Game KNB?"	September 14, 2022
For this week's main challenge, the queens play the Snatch Game. Jon Santos and Jojie Dingcong star as the celebrity contestants. The cast consisted of: Brigiding as Elizabeth Ramsey; Eva Le Queen as Rufa Mae Quinto; Marina Summers as Gloria Macapagal Arroyo; Minty Fresh as Maria Sofia Love; Precious Paula Nicole as Charo Santos-Concio; Viñas DeLuxe as Kris Aquino and Boy Abunda; Xilhouete as Vicki Belo; On the runway, the category is Two-in-One Ruvelation. Eva Le Queen, Marina Summers and Xilhouete receive positive critiques, with Xilhouete winning the challenge. Brigiding, Minty Fresh and Viñas DeLuxe receive negative critiques, with Viñas DeLuxe being safe. Brigiding and Minty Fresh lip-sync to "Amakabogera" by Maymay Entrata. Both queens win the lip-sync and no one goes home.: Alternating Judge: Jon Santos and BJ Pascual; Main Challenge: Snatch Game; Runway Theme: Two-in-One Ruvelation; Challenge Winner: Xilhouete; Challenge Prize: A ₱80,000 cash tip; Bottom Two: Brigiding and Minty Fresh; Lip-Sync Song: "Amakabogera" by Maymay Entrata; Eliminated: None
7	7	"The Shop Shop Ladies Ball"	September 21, 2022
For this week's mini-challenge, the queens do a nude illusion group photoshoot. Minty Fresh wins the mini-challenge. For the main challenge, the queens create two looks for The Shop Shop Ladies Ball: Shopulence, She Buys Everything! and Divi-Divas. On the runway, Marina Summers, Minty Fresh and Xilhouete receive positive critiques, with Minty Fresh winning the challenge. Eva Le Queen, Precious Paula Nicole and Viñas DeLuxe receive negative critiques, with Precious Paula Nicole being safe. Eva Le Queen and Viñas DeLuxe lip-sync to "Born Naked" by RuPaul ft. Clairy Browne. Eva Le Queen wins the lip-sync and Viñas DeLuxe sashays away.: Alternating Judges: BJ Pascual and Rajo Laurel; Mini-Challenge: Nude illusion group photoshoot; Mini-Challenge Winner: Minty Fresh; Mini-Challenge Prize: A ₱20,000 cash tip; Main Challenge: The Shop Shop Ladies Ball; Runway Themes: Shopulence, She Buys Everything! and Divi-Divas; Challenge Winner: Minty Fresh; Challenge Prize: A ₱80,000 cash tip; Bottom Two: Eva Le Queen and Viñas DeLuxe; Lip-Sync Song: "Born Naked" by RuPaul ft. Clairy Browne; Eliminated: Viñas DeLuxe; Farewell Message: "Love you girls ♡ - Viñas"
8	8	"Twinning!"	September 28, 2022
For this week's mini-challenge, the queens read each other to filth. Eva Le Queen wins the mini-challenge. For the main challenge, the queens makeover a loved one. On the runway, category is Twinning. Eva Le Queen, Precious Paula Nicole and Xilhouete receive positive critiques, with Xilhouete winning the challenge. Brigiding, Marina Summers and Minty Fresh receive negative critiques, with Marina Summers being safe. Brigiding and Minty Fresh lip-sync to "Dyosa" by Yumi Lacsamana. Minty Fresh wins the lip-sync and Brigiding sashays away.: Guest Judge: Patrick Starrr; Alternating Judge: Rajo Laurel; Mini-Challenge: Reading is Fundamental; Mini-Challenge Winner: Eva Le Queen; Mini-Challenge Prize: A ₱20,000 cash tip; Main Challenge: Makeover a loved one; Runway Theme: Twinning; Challenge Winner: Xilhouete; Challenge Prize: A ₱80,000 cash tip; Bottom Two: Brigiding and Minty Fresh; Lip-Sync Song: "Dyosa" by Yumi Lacsamana; Eliminated: Brigiding; Farewell Message: "Love you! Bring it all the time, see you all after! Brigiding!❤"
9	9	"Charot of Fire"	October 5, 2022
For this week's main challenge, the queens star and perform in a music video for RuPaul's song "Champion". On the runway, categories are LED There Be Light and Come In Your Best Drag. Eva Le Queen, Marina Summers and Precious Paula Nicole receive positive critiques, with Marina Summers winning the challenge. Minty Fresh and Xilhouete receive negative critiques and are announced as the bottom two. They lip-sync to "You'll Always be My Number One" by Vernie Varga. Xilhouete wins the lip sync and Minty Fresh sashays away.: Guest Judge: Boy Abunda; Alternating Judge: Jon Santos; Main Challenge: Star and perform in a music video for RuPaul's song "Champion"; Runway Themes: LED There Be Light and Come In Your Best Drag; Challenge Winner: Marina Summers; Main Challenge Prize: ₱80,000; Bottom Two: Minty Fresh and Xilhouete; Lip-Sync Song: "You'll Always be My Number One" by Vernie Varga; Eliminated: Minty Fresh; Farewell Message: "At least Maganda! Stay Fresh Top 4! ♡ Minty Fresh" ("At least I'm pretty! Stay Fresh Top 4! ♡ Minty Fresh")
10	10	"Grand Finale"	October 12, 2022
For the final challenge of the season, the queens walk the runway one last time in their Bongga Camp Day (Fabulous Camp Girl) and their Indigenous Extravaganza looks. The eliminated queens all return to the runway, where it is announced that Lady Morgana is this season's Miss Congeniality. Paolo then announces that the final four queens will take part in a Lip-Sync Smackdown for the Crown. The first lip-sync is between Eva Le Queen and Precious Paula Nicole. They lip-sync to "Sissy That Walk" by RuPaul. Precious Paula Nicole wins the lip-sync and Eva Le Queen is eliminated. The second lip-sync is between Marina Summers and Xilhouete. They lip-sync to "Call Me Mother" by RuPaul. Marina Summers wins the lip-sync and Xilhouete is eliminated. The final lip-sync is between Marina Summers and Precious Paula Nicole. They lip-sync to "Sirena" by Gloc-9 ft. Ebe Dancel. It is announced that Precious Paula Nicole is the winner, leaving Marina Summers as the runner-up.: Alternating Judges: Rajo Laurel and Jon Santos; Runway Themes: Bongga Camp Day (Fabulous Camp Girl) and Indigenous Extravaganza; Final Four: Eva Le Queen, Marina Summers, Precious Paula Nicole, and Xilhouete; Miss Congeniality: Lady Morgana; Lip-Sync #1: Eva Le Queen vs. Precious Paula Nicole; Lip-Sync Song: "Sissy That Walk" by RuPaul; Eliminated: Eva Le Queen; Lip-Sync #2: Marina Summers vs. Xilhouete; Lip-Sync Song: "Call Me Mother" by RuPaul; Eliminated: Xilhouete; Lip-Sync #3: Marina Summers vs. Precious Paula Nicole; Lip-Sync Song: "Sirena" by Gloc-9 ft. Ebe Dancel; Runner-up: Marina Summers; Winner of Drag Race Philippines Season One: Precious Paula Nicole
