= Drag Race Philippines =

Philippine reality television series

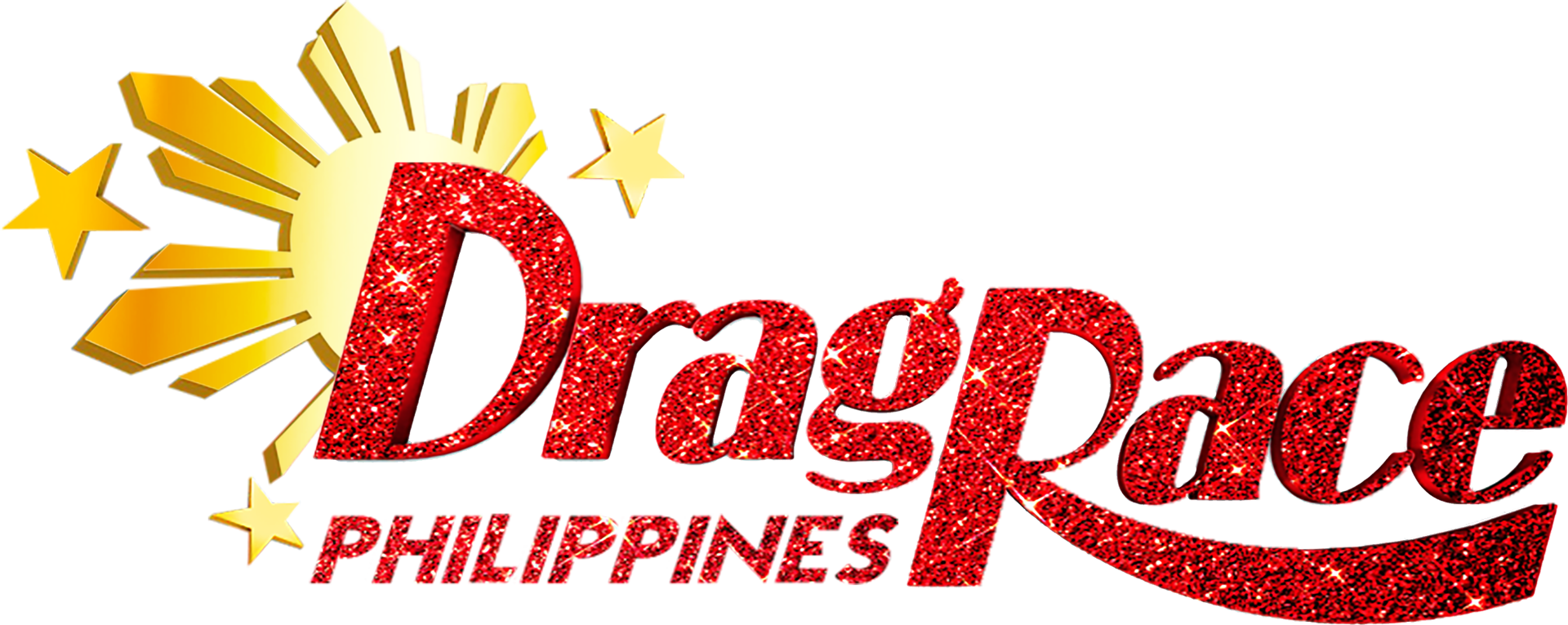
- Genre: Reality competition
- Directed by: Arnel Natividad; Ice Seguerra
- Presented by: Paolo Ballesteros
- Judges: Paolo Ballesteros; Jiggly Caliente (s. 1–3); KaladKaren
- Ending theme: "Rock It (To the Moon)" by RuPaul Charles
- Country of origin: Philippines
- Original languages: English; Filipino / Tagalog
- No. of seasons: 4
- No. of episodes: 36 (list of episodes)

Production
- Executive producers: Randy Barbato; Fenton Bailey; Tom Campbell; RuPaul Charles; Alex Godinez-Lopez; Yanah Laurel; Jimson Tamano; Maricel Ticar Santos; Gina Godinez
- Camera setup: Multi-camera
- Running time: 55–90 minutes
- Production companies: Fullhouse Asia; World of Wonder

Original release
- Network: HBO Go (s. 1–3); WOW Presents Plus
- Release: August 17, 2022 – present

Related
- Drag Race Philippines: Slaysian Royale

Drag Race Philippines is a Philippine reality competition television series, and an adaptation based on the American television franchise RuPaul's Drag Race. It documents contestants participating in different challenges, at the invitation of drag performer Paolo Ballesteros, every week to compete and be inducted as the Philippines' Next Drag Superstar.

In every episode, it employs a panel of judges with Ballesteros and KaladKaren, with alternative judges such as BJ Pascual, Jon Santos, and Rajo Laurel, alongside a celebrity guest judge. Jiggly Caliente also judged for three consecutive seasons, but announced in a statement, she will not return due to extensive recovery from a severe infection; she died on April 27, 2025. As of 2024, Precious Paula Nicole, Captivating Katkat, and Maxie were crowned as winners of the series.

The series is the tenth international adaptation from the Drag Race franchise. It is co-produced by Fullhouse Asia and World of Wonder, and first premiered for streaming services HBO Go and WOW Presents Plus on August 17, 2022. A spin-off from the series was made, subtitled Slaysian Royale, which brought several contestants from other franchises returning to compete in the Philippines.

== Production history ==
American drag queen RuPaul Charles first announced the Philippine adaptation, and is credited as an executive producer alongside Randy Barbato, Fenton Bailey, and Tom Campbell. Casting soon opened from production company World of Wonder, alongside their partnership with Fullhouse Asia, on August 16, 2021.

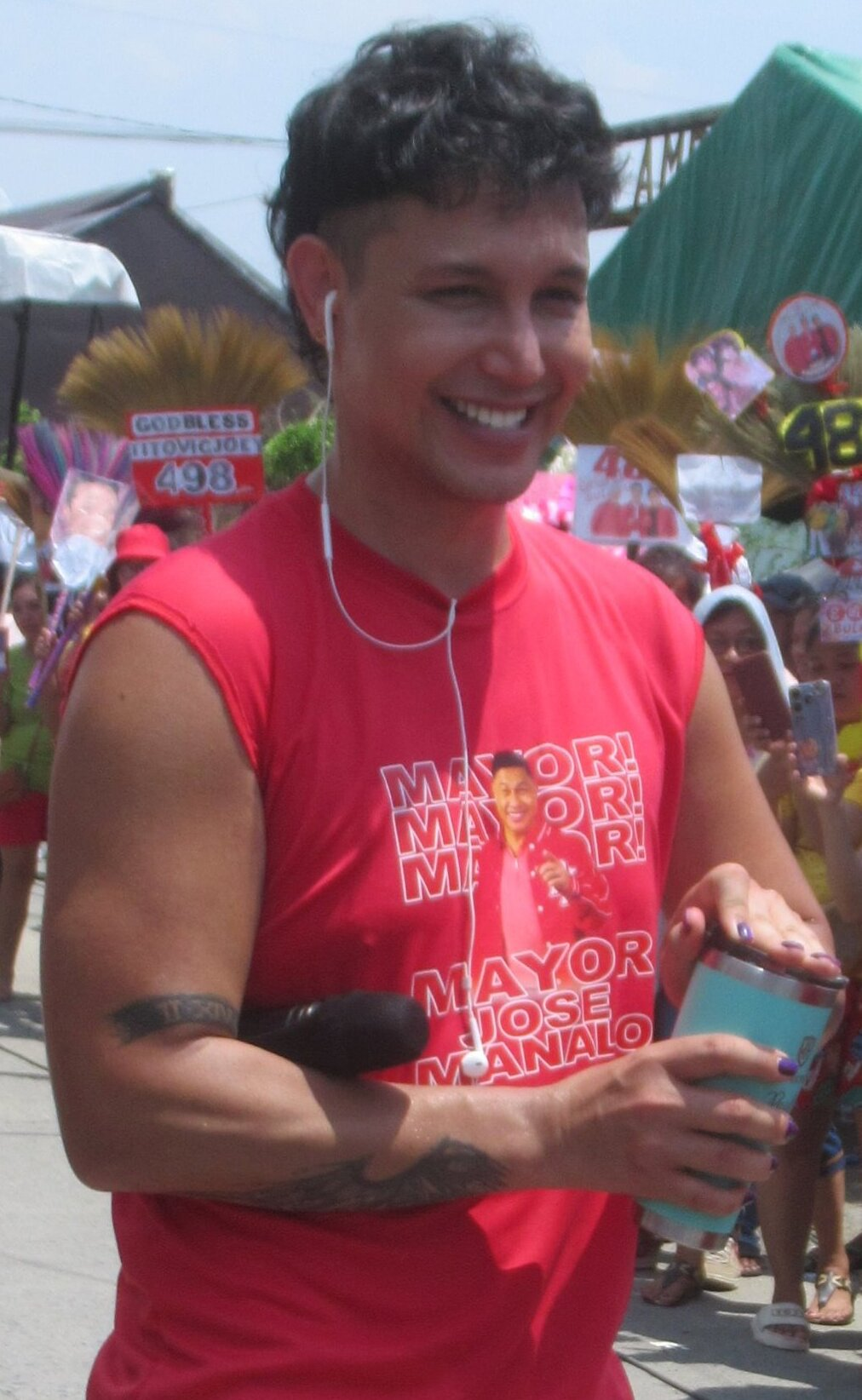
Paolo Ballesteros as the host and primary judge

Entertainment Weekly reportedly that entertainer Jiggly Caliente will show up as a permanent judge on May 14, 2022; she previously competed in RuPaul's Drag Race (2012) and All Stars (2021). A short trailer showcased the workroom and mainstage, with a silhouette of the host, and revealed it will have a companion series. A month later, it was confirmed that actor and comedian Paolo Ballesteros was given the opportunity to host Drag Race Philippines on July 13.

This soon unveiled another judge, whom is television personality KaladKaren; this marked the first franchise to have two transgender women appear in the panel of judges. Before the franchise aired, photographer BJ Pascual, fashion designer Rajo Laurel and actor and comedian Jon Santos were announced as the alternating judges on August 11. Actor and singer Ice Seguerra revealed and made his television directorial debut on August 20.

Former and recurring judges on Drag Race Philippines
Judge	Season			
Judge	1	2	3	4
Paolo Ballesteros	Main	Main	Main	Main
Jiggly Caliente	Main	Main	Main	
KaladKaren	Main	Main	Main	Main
BJ Pascual	Alternative	Alternative	Alternative	Alternative
Jon Santos	Alternative	Alternative	Alternative	Alternative
Rajo Laurel	Alternative	Alternative	Alternative	Alternative

Before the first season ended, Laurel teased about the renewal for the series on October 6, 2022, but its streaming services denied this comment and was not in production. It was shortly renewed the same month with casting opened until December 1 for season two. Warner Bros. Discovery Asia-Pacific soon announced that Discovery+ would be discontinued in the Philippines on April 27, 2023, this left the national broadcasting exclusivity to video-on demand service HBO Go.

A family statement revealed that Jiggly Caliente would not return as a judge, due to her right leg having been surgically amputated from a severe infection on April 24, 2025. Three days later, she died in a hospital at age 44. An in memoriam segment was shown in the spin-off premiere episode with Ballesteros later dedicating the season to her. A year later, a fourth casting call was made on January 10, 2026, but production was stopped in early April due to the following death of contestant Misua.

== Series overview ==
Season	Contestants	Episodes	Originally released		Winner	Runner-Up	Miss Congeniality
Season	Contestants	Episodes	First released	Last released	Winner	Runner-Up	Miss Congeniality
1	12	10	August 17, 2022	October 12, 2022	Precious Paula Nicole	Marina Summers	Lady Morgana
2	12	10	August 2, 2023	October 4, 2023	Captivating Katkat	Arizona Brandy	Hana Beshie
3	11	10	August 7, 2024	October 9, 2024	Maxie	Khianna	Versex
4	12	TBA	September 25, 2026	TBA	TBA	TBA	TBA

== Season synopses ==
=== Season 1 (2022) ===
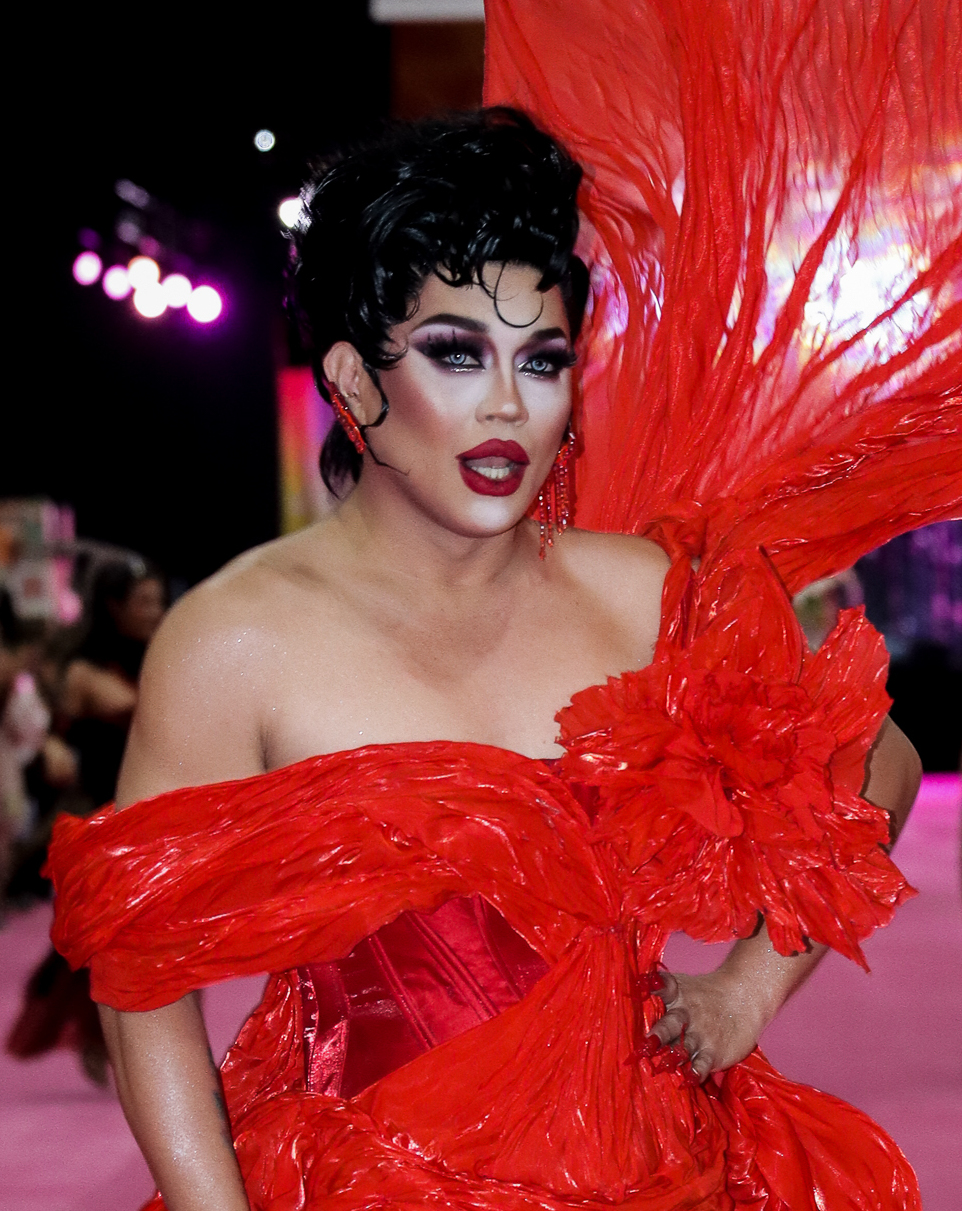
Precious Paula Nicole won the first season.

The contestants were first announced in their visual presentation throughout social media on July 27, 2022. A teaser was released on August 4, featuring Paolo Ballesteros waving two checkered flags with every contestant introducing themselves.

It debuted through streaming services Discovery+ and HBO Go for the Philippines simultaneously, with Crave for Canada, and including WOW Presents Plus internationally in August 2022. An online video was released through YouTube that featured the first 20 minutes from the first episode. Ongina and Rock M. Sakura hosted the American webseries Fashion Photo RuView, where they reviewed the garments from contestants. This season ran for ten episodes and concluded in October.

Precious Paula Nicole won the season after lip-syncing to "Sirena" (2012) by rapper Gloc-9 and was crowned as the Philippines' First Drag Superstar. This also included a one-year supply from ONE/SIZE cosmetics, with a crown and scepter, and a cash prize of ₱1,000,000. Marina Summers was the runner-up, with Lady Morgana (whom eliminated fifth overall) voted as Miss Congeniality. The contestants who competed and eliminated were Prince, Corazon, Gigi Era, Turing, Viñas DeLuxe, Brigiding, Minty Fresh, Xilhouete, and Eva Le Queen.

=== Season 2 (2023) ===
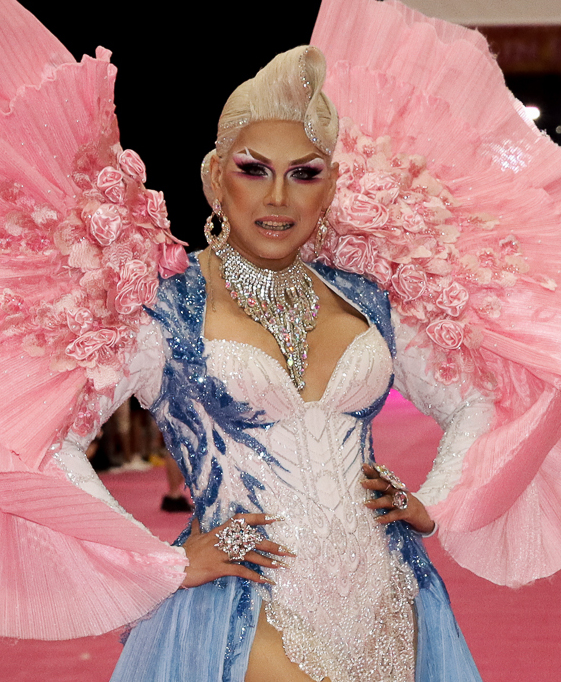
Captivating Katkat won the second season.

After season one concluded, it was immediately renewed on October 19, with casting opened the same month until December 2022. A teaser image was soon posted through Instagram on June 29, 2023. This led to showcase its previous panel of judges in a tropical-themed set, with the contestants and their visual presentation announced on July 11. The season premiered through HBO Go for the Philippines and WOW Presents Plus internationally in August 2023. It was ended in October which ran for ten episodes.

Captivating Katkat was crowned as the Philippines' Next Drag Superstar, after lip-syncing to "Kapangyarihan" (2021) by iDolls. She was handed a cash prize of ₱1,000,000, with a crown and scepter, and a one-year supply of cosmetics from Anastasia Beverly Hills. Arizona Brandy was the runner-up, with Hana Beshie (whom eliminated fifth overall) voted as Miss Congeniality. The contestants who competed and eliminated were Nicole Pardaux, Astrid Mercury, Tiny DeLuxe, Veruschka Levels, Matilduh, DeeDee Marié Holliday, ØV Cünt, M1ss Jade So, and Bernie.

=== Season 3 (2024) ===
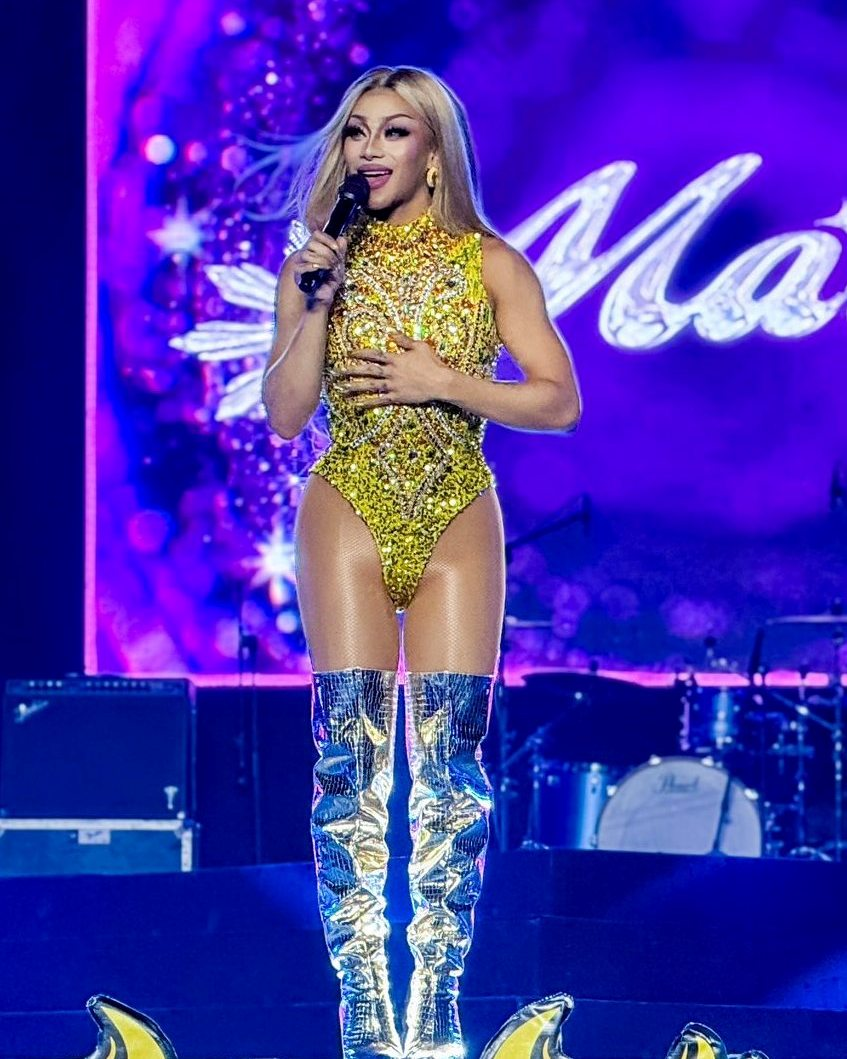
Maxie won the third season.

The third season premiered on August 7, 2024 and concluded on October 9, 2024. It aired on HBO Go in the Philippines and WOW Presents Plus internationally. In the Grand Finale episode, Maxie was crowned the season's winner, with Khianna being named the runner-up after they lip-synced to "Lipad ng Pangarap" (2012) by Angeline Quinto and Regine Velasquez. Maxie's rewards included a crown and scepter, a one-year supply of cosmetics from Anastasia Beverly Hills, and a cash prize of ₱1,000,000. Versex, who was the first contestant eliminated, was honored with the title of Miss Congeniality. The contestants who competed and eliminated were Yudipota, J Quinn, John Fedellaga, Popstar Bench, Myx Chanel, Zymba Ding, Tita Baby, and Angel.

== Spin-offs and other media ==
=== Untucked! ===
After a teaser trailer was released, this announced a companion series subtitled Untucked! which marked the first international iteration based from the American television franchise. It showcases deleted or unseen footage, short altercations, unresolved conflicts from contestants, and key moments. This documentary format began to premiere two days after its main edition; its scheduling changed for season two.

=== Slaysian Royale ===
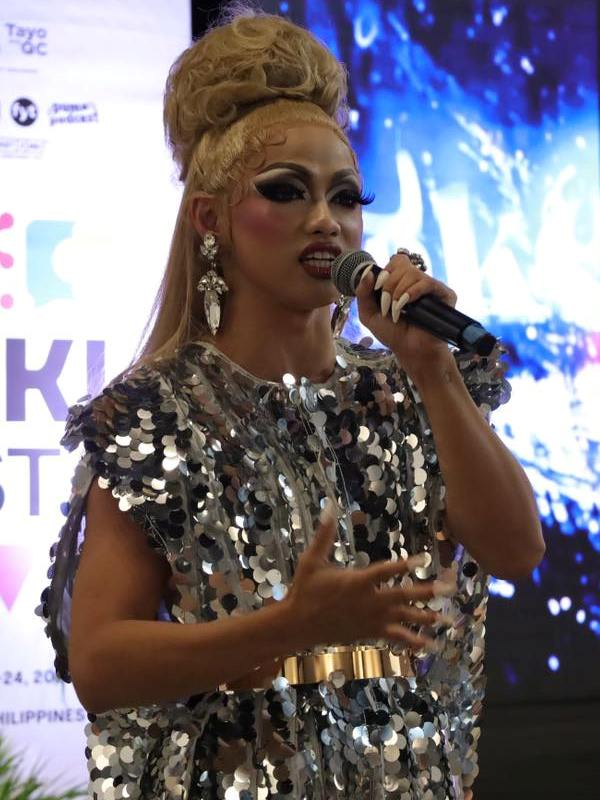
Brigiding won the inaugural season of Slaysian Royale.

On 13 March 2025, World of Wonder announced that Drag Race Philippines: Slaysian Royale, a spin-off series of Drag Race Philippines, would premiere in late 2025. The series featured contestants from previous Drag Race Philippines series compete with Asian queens from other franchises, similar to the vs. the World format previously featured in the United Kingdom and Canada. The cast of the first series consisted of Brigiding and Viñas DeLuxe (both from Drag Race Philippines season 1), Arizona Brandy and Bernie (both from Drag Race Philippines season 2), Khianna (from Drag Race Philippines season 3), Ivory Glaze (from RuPaul's Drag Race Down Under season 3), Kitty Space (from Drag Race France season 2), Madame Yoko (from Drag Race Belgique season 2), Siam Phusri (from Drag Race Thailand season 3), Suki Doll (from Canada's Drag Race season 2), Sum Ting Wong (from RuPaul's Drag Race UK season 1), and Yuhua (from RuPaul's Drag Race season 10). The series began on 13 August 2025, with the winner receiving a cash prize of ₱2,000,000, a crown and scepter, one-year supply of cosmetics from Anastasia Beverly Hills, and a spot in the "Slaysian Royale Hall of Fame". During the finale on 15 October 2025, Brigiding was crowned as the first "Slaysian Royale Drag Superstar", with Viñas DeLuxe as the runner-up.

== See also ==
- List of reality television programs with LGBTQ cast members
