= Lady Morgana =

Filipino drag performer

- Television: Drag Race Philippines (season 1)

Lady Morgana is a Filipino drag performer who competed on season 1 of Drag Race Philippines.

== Career ==
Lady Morgana competed on season 1 of Drag Race Philippines. She did not win any challenges, and became the show's first contestant to survive two lip-syncs. She placed in the bottom two three times, and was eliminated from the competition after losing a lip sync against Brigiding. Lady Morgana had impersonated Lea Salonga in the Rusical challenge, and was crowned the season's Miss Congeniality.

Sam Damshenas of Gay Times has Lady Morgana "one of the most notable drag entertainers in the Philippines". She has been a brand ambassador for the cosmetics company Ever Bilena. Outside of drag, Lady Morgana works as a financial adviser.

== Personal life ==
Lady Morgana is from Davao City.
