= Drag Race Philippines season 3 =

2024 season of television series

Drag Race Philippines
- Season 3
- Promotional poster for season three
- Hosted by: Paolo Ballesteros
- Judges: Paolo Ballesteros; KaladKaren; Jiggly Caliente; Rajo Laurel; Jon Santos; BJ Pascual
- No. of contestants: 11
- Winner: Maxie
- Runner-up: Khianna
- Miss Congeniality: Versex
- No. of episodes: 10

Release
- Original network: HBO Go (Philippines); WOW Presents Plus (International)
- Original release: August 7 – October 9, 2024

Season chronology
- ← Previous; Season 2 Next → Season 4

The third season of Drag Race Philippines premiered on 7 August 2024. The season airs on HBO Go in Philippines and WOW Presents Plus internationally. The season was confirmed by World of Wonder on 17 October 2023.

The winner of the third Drag Race Philippines was Maxie, with Khianna as the runner-up. Versex was named Miss Congeniality.

== Production ==
On 25 October 2023, it was announced via the show's official Instagram page, that casting for the third season was now open. Applications remained open for four weeks until it closed on 24 November 2023.

On 4 July 2024, a promotional post was released on social media. The post showcases the host, Paolo Ballesteros in a black-and-white themed set. Eleven contestants were announced on 11 July 2024. Participants include Queen of the Universe season 2 contestant Maxie who, alongside her biological sibling Angel, become the second pair of biological relatives to compete in the franchise, following Sugar and Spice from the American adaptation.

== Contestants ==
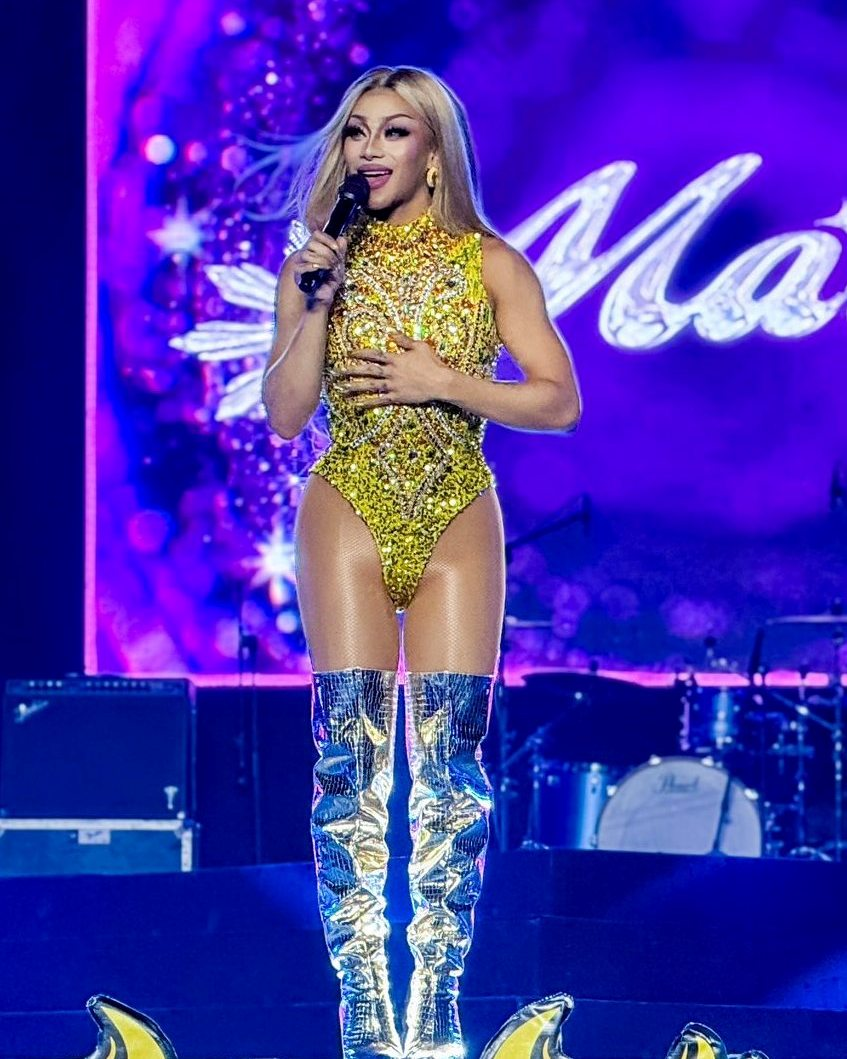
Season 3 winner Maxie

Drag Race Philippines season 3 contestants and their backgrounds (Note: All ages, names, with hometowns, and outcome are stated at time of filming.)
Contestant	Age	Hometown	Outcome
Maxie (Note: Maxie Andreison is referred to as Maxie on the show.)	24	Manila, Metro Manila	Winner
Khianna	22	Cagayan de Oro, Misamis Oriental	Runner-up
Angel (Note: Angel Galang is referred to as Angel on the show.)	23	Manila, Metro Manila	3rd place
Tita Baby (Note: Tita Baby Azucarera, also known as Your Tita Baby, is referred to as Tita Baby on the show.)	46	Marikina, Metro Manila	3rd place
Zymba Ding	22	Caloocan, Metro Manila	5th place
Myx Chanel	27	Marikina, Metro Manila	6th place
Popstar Bench	26	Manila, Metro Manila	7th place
John Fedellaga	33	San Francisco, United States	8th place
J Quinn	25	Caloocan, Metro Manila	9th place
Yudipota (Note: Yudipota Marupokpok is referred to as Yudipota on the show.)	27	Bacolod, Negros Occidental	10th place (Note: Yudipota was placed in the bottom two and quit the competition during the lip-sync.)
Versex	25	Manila, Metro Manila	11th place (Note: Versex was voted Miss Congeniality.)

Footnotes

== Contestant progress ==
Legend:

Maxie won Drag Race Philippines season 3.
Khianna was the runner-up.
Versex was voted Miss Congeniality (Miss C) by fellow contestants.
WIN indicates that the contestant won the challenge.
TOP2 indicates that the contestant was one of the two best performing in the challenge, but lost the lip sync to win it.
STAY indicates that the contestant won their LaLaPaRuZa lip sync and remained in the competition.
SAFE indicates that the contestant was declared safe by the judges.
BLT indicates that Khianna was given the Golden Balut by the other contestants and was saved from participating in the final LaLaPaRuZa lip sync.
BTM (Bottom) indicates that the contestant was up for elimination.
ELIM (Eliminated) indicates that the contestant was eliminated.
QUIT indicates that Yudipota quit the competition.
Guest indicates that the contestant returned as a guest.

Contestants progress with placements in each episode
Contestant	Episode									
Contestant	1	2	3	4	5	6	7	8	9	10
Maxie	SAFE	SAFE	WIN	WIN	SAFE	SAFE	WIN	STAY	SAFE	Winner
Khianna	WIN	SAFE	SAFE	SAFE	SAFE	SAFE	BTM	BLT	SAFE	Runner-up
Angel	SAFE	BTM	SAFE	SAFE	WIN	SAFE	SAFE	STAY	WIN	Eliminated
Tita Baby	SAFE	BTM	SAFE	SAFE	SAFE	SAFE	SAFE	STAY	BTM	Eliminated
Zymba Ding	TOP2	SAFE	SAFE	SAFE	BTM	WIN	SAFE	BTM	ELIM	Guest
Myx Chanel	SAFE	WIN	BTM	SAFE	SAFE	SAFE	SAFE	ELIM	Guest	Guest
Popstar Bench	SAFE	SAFE	SAFE	SAFE	SAFE	BTM	ELIM		Guest	Guest
John Fedellaga	SAFE	SAFE	SAFE	SAFE	SAFE	ELIM			Guest	Guest
J Quinn	SAFE	SAFE	SAFE	BTM	ELIM				Guest	Guest
Yudipota	SAFE	SAFE	SAFE	QUIT					Guest	Guest
Versex	SAFE	SAFE	ELIM						Guest	Miss C

== Lip syncs ==
Legend:

The contestant won the lip sync to win the challenge.
The contestant was eliminated after their first time in the bottom.
The contestant was eliminated after their second time in the bottom.
The contestant was eliminated after their third time in the bottom.
The contestant was in the bottom, but quit the competition during the lip sync.
The contestant won the first round of the Lip Sync LaLaPaRuZa Smackdown and remained in the competition.
The contestant won the Lip Sync Smackdown for the Crown and was declared the winner of the season.

Episode	Contestants			Song	Winner
1	Khianna	vs.	Zymba Ding	"Puede Ba" (Maymay Entrata)	Khianna
Episode	Contestants			Song	Eliminated
2	Angel	vs.	Tita Baby	"Nosi Balasi" (Sampaguita)	None
3	Myx Chanel	vs.	Versex	"Miss Manila" (Angeline Quinto)	Versex
4	J Quinn	vs.	Yudipota	"Wag Kang Pabebe" (Vice Ganda)	Yudipota
5	J Quinn	vs.	Zymba Ding	"Geronimo" (RuPaul)	J Quinn
6	John Fedellaga	vs.	Popstar Bench	"Dadalhin" (Regine Velasquez)	John Fedellaga
7	Khianna	vs.	Popstar Bench	"Get Your Rebel On" (RuPaul)	Popstar Bench
Episode	Contestants			Song	Winner
8	Myx Chanel	vs.	Tita Baby	"Adrenaline" (RuPaul)	Tita Baby
8	Angel	vs.	Khianna	"Loka Loka" (Queen Manica Money)	Angel
8	Maxie	vs.	Zymba Ding	"Hush" (Yassi Pressman, Nadine Lustre)	Maxie
8	Contestants			Song	Eliminated
8	Myx Chanel	vs.	Zymba Ding	"Ligaw Tingin" (Leah Navarro)	Myx Chanel
9	Tita Baby	vs.	Zymba Ding	"Isa Pang Araw" (Sarah Geronimo)	Zymba Ding
Episode	Top 2 contestants			Song	Winner
10	Khianna	vs.	Maxie	"Lipad ng Pangarap" (Angeline Quinto, Regine Velasquez)	Maxie

== Guest judges ==
Listed in chronological order:

- Jolina Magdangal-Escueta, singer, actress, and television presenter
- R'Bonney Gabriel, fashion designer and Miss Universe 2022
- Angeline Quinto, singer and actress
- Melai Cantiveros, actress, comedian, and winnwepresenter
- Kyle Echarri, actor and singer
- Precious Paula Nicole, winner of Drag Race Philippines season 1
- Sharon Cuneta, actress and singer
- Janella Salvador, actress and singer

=== Special guests ===
Guests who appeared in episodes, but did not judge on the main stage.

Episode 1:

- Arizona Brandy, runner-up on Drag Race Philippines season 2
- Bernie, finalist on Drag Race Philippines season 2
- Brigiding, contestant on Drag Race Philippines season 1
- Minty Fresh, contestant on Drag Race Philippines season 1
- M1ss Jade So, finalist on Drag Race Philippines season 2
- Viñas DeLuxe, contestant on Drag Race Philippines season 1

Episode 3:

- Moophs, musician, producer, songwriter and DJ

Episode 6:

- Cecile Martinez, choreographer

Episode 7

- Norvina, president of Anastasia Beverly Hills

Episode 9

- Nunoy Revlon, choreographer

Episode 10

- Hana Beshie, contestant and Miss Congeniality on the second season of Drag Race Philippines
- Captivating Katkat, winner on the second season of Drag Race Philippines

== Episodes ==
No. overall	No. in series	Title	Original release date
21	1	"Viral Queens"	August 7, 2024
Eleven new queens enter the workroom. For the first mini-challenge, the queens perform a voguing routine in front of the other queens and previous Drag Race Philippines queens. Khianna wins the mini-challenge. For the main challenge, the queens create a one-minute viral dance video that showcases their personality and/or brand. On the runway, category is Hometown Realness. Khianna, Maxie, Myx Chanel, Tita Baby, Yudipota and Zymba Ding receive positive critiques. It is announced that Khianna and Zymba Ding are the top two queens of the week, and will lip-sync for the win. They lip-sync to "Puede Ba" by Maymay Entrata. After the lip sync, Khianna is announced as the winner of the challenge. Paolo Ballesteros then announces that no one will be going home.: Guest Judge: Jolina Magdangal-Escueta; Alternating Judge: Jon Santos; Mini-Challenge: Perform a voguing routine in front of the other queens and previous Drag Race Philippines queens; Mini-Challenge Winner: Khianna; Mini-Challenge Prize: A ₱20,000 cash tip; Main Challenge: Create a one-minute viral dance video that showcases your personality and/or brand; Runway Theme: Hometown Realness; Top Two: Khianna and Zymba Ding; Lip-Sync Song: "Puede Ba" by Maymay Entrata; Challenge Winner: Khianna; Challenge Prize: A ₱80,000 cash tip
22	2	"The Sustaina-Ball"	August 14, 2024
For this week's mini-challenge, the queens play a game of Tumbang Preso (Prisoner Lockdown). Versex wins the mini-challenge. For the main challenge, the queens create two looks for The Sustaina-Ball: Sari-Sari Store Eleganza and Trash-ion. On the runway, Khianna, Myx Chanel and Yudipota receive positive critiques, with Myx Chanel winning the challenge. Angel, Tita Baby and Versex receive negative critiques, with Versex being safe. Angel and Tita Baby lip-sync to "Nosi Ba Lasi" by Sampaguita. Both queens win the lip-sync and no one goes home.: Guest Judge: R'Bonney Gabriel; Mini-Challenge: Play a game of Tumbang Preso (Prisoner Lockdown); Mini-Challenge Winner: Versex; Mini-Challenge Prize: A ₱20,000 cash tip; Main Challenge: The Sustaina-Ball; Runway Themes: Sari-Sari Store Eleganza and Trash-ion; Challenge Winner: Myx Chanel; Challenge Prize: A ₱80,000 cash tip; Bottom Two: Angel and Tita Baby; Lip-Sync Song: "Nosi Ba Lasi" by Sampaguita
23	3	"Dapat Pakak!"	August 21, 2024
For this week's mini-challenge, the queens play rounds of sack race. Khianna wins the mini-challenge. For the main challenge, the queens write, record, and perform verses to "Dapat Pakak!".: Team Burakpak - Angel, Khianna, Maxie, Popstar Bench, Versex and Zymba Ding; Team Hard Pakakers - J Quinn, John Fedellaga, Myx Chanel, Tita Baby and Yudipota; On the runway, category is Per-Yeah! John Fedellaga, Khianna, Maxie and Popstar Bench receive positive critiques, with Maxie winning the challenge. J Quinn, Myx Chanel and Versex receive negative critiques, with J Quinn being safe. Myx Chanel and Versex lip-sync to "Miss Manila" by Angeline Quinto. Myx Chanel wins the lip-sync and Versex is the first queen to sashay away.: Guest Judge: Angeline Quinto; Alternating Judge: BJ Pascual; Mini-Challenge: Play rounds of sack race; Mini-Challenge Winner: Khianna; Mini-Challenge Prize: A ₱20,000 cash prize; Main Challenge: Write, record, and perform verses to "Dapat Pakak!"; Runway Theme: Per-Yeah!; Challenge Winner: Maxie; Challenge Prize: A ₱80,000 cash prize; Bottom Two: Myx Chanel and Versex; Lip-Sync Song: "Miss Manila" by Angeline Quinto; Eliminated: Versex; Farewell Message: "Forever im that Girl I'm Versex Babe! always & forever xoxo 💋"
24	4	"Pao Presents Plus"	August 28, 2024
For this week's mini-challenge, the queens have two minutes to guess the contents of four boxes, while blindfolded. John Fedellaga wins the mini-challenge. For the main challenge, the queens pair up to create shows for Pao Presents Plus.: "Jojowain o Totropahin?" - John Fedellaga and Popstar Bench; "PURSE First" - Myx Chanel and Tita Baby; "TOOT Nice Xa / BOOT is a No" - J Quinn and Yudipota; "69 For The Win" - Angel and Khiannna; "Cooking Ina" - Maxie and Zymba Ding; On the runway, category is 3D Fractal Extravaganza. John Fedellaga, Khianna and Maxie receive positive critiques, with Maxie winning the challenge. J Quinn, Myx Chanel, and Yudipota receive negative critiques, with Myx Chanel being safe. J Quinn and Yudipota lip-sync to "Wag Kang Pabebe" by Vice Ganda. During the lip-sync, Yudipota walks off stage and quits the competition. Because of this decision, J Quinn wins the lip-sync.: Guest Judge: Melai Cantiveros; Alternating Judge: BJ Pascual; Mini-Challenge: While blindfolded, guess the contents of four boxes within two minutes; Mini-Challenge Winner: John Fedellaga; Mini-Challenge Prize: A ₱20,000 cash tip; Main Challenge: In pairs, create shows for Pao Presents Plus; Runway Theme: 3D Fractal Extravaganza; Challenge Winner: Maxie; Challenge Prize: A ₱80,000 cash prize; Bottom Two: J Quinn and Yudipota; Lip-Sync Song: "Wag Kang Pabebe" by Vice Ganda; Quit: Yudipota; Farewell Message: "I'm so sorry for my future self, you guys and the fans. Yudi"
25	5	"Snatch Game" "Snatch Game KNB?"	September 4, 2024
For this week's mini-challenge, the queens do a 90's inspired notebook cover photoshoot. Khianna wins the mini-challenge. For the main challenge, the queens play the Snatch Game. Jon Santos and Kyle Echarri star as the celebrity contestants. The cast consisted of: Angel as Maria Clara; J Quinn as Confucius; John Fedellaga as Angel Locsin; Khianna as Baron Geisler; Maxie as Babae sa Balete Drive; Myx Chanel as Rufa Mae Quinto; Popstar Bench as Sarah Geronimo; Tita Baby as Kamatayan; Zymba Ding as Wilma Doesnt; On the runway, category is Gosh With The Wind. Angel, John Fedellaga, and Tita Baby receive positive critiques, with Angel winning the challenge. J Quinn, Myx Chanel, and Zymba Ding receive negative critiques, with Myx Chanel being safe. J Quinn and Zymba Ding lip-sync to "Geronimo" by RuPaul. Zymba Ding wins the lip-sync and J Quinn sashays away.: Guest Judge: Kyle Echarri; Alternating Judge: Jon Santos; Mini-Challenge: 90's inspired notebook cover photoshoot; Mini-Challenge Winner: Khianna; Mini-Challenge Prize: A ₱20,000 cash tip; Main Challenge: Snatch Game; Runway Theme: Gosh With The Wind; Challenge Winner: Angel; Challenge Prize: A ₱80,000 cash prize; Bottom Two: J Quinn and Zymba Ding; Lip-Sync Song: "Geronimo" by RuPaul; Eliminated: J Quinn; Farewell Message: "♡ LOVE YOU GUYS I'll treat this as my first K-pop survival show sooooooooo support me girls for my Grand Debut ♡ Papahirapan kita magbura Zymba!!!"
26	6	"AaWicked Kita: The Rusical"	September 11, 2024
For this week's mini-challenge, the queens recreate a line from Ogie Diaz acting workshop in the most exaggerated manner possible. Zymba Ding wins the mini-challenge. For the main challenge, the queens perform in AaWicked Kita: The Rusical.: Angel plays Christy (Christy Turlington); John Fedellaga plays Cindy Awwford (Cindy Crawford); Khianna plays Naomi Campybell (Naomi Campbell); Maxie plays Professor Diamond (Doctor Dillamond); Myx Chanel plays Glenda (Glinda); Popstar Bench plays Mayor Jhoy (Joy Belmonte); Tita Baby plays Tita Needz (Madam Morrible); Zymba Ding plays Elvie (Elphaba); On the runway, category is Kum-Haute Couture. Myx Chanel, Tita Baby, and Zymba Ding receive positive critiques, with Zymba Ding winning the challenge. Angel, John Fedellaga, and Popstar Bench receive negative critiques, with Angel being declared safe. John Fedellaga and Popstar Bench lip-sync to "Dadalhin" by Regine Velasquez. Popstar Bench wins the lip-sync and John Fedellaga sashays away.: Guest Judge: Precious Paula Nicole; Alternating Judge: Jon Santos; Mini-Challenge: Recreate a line from Ogie Diaz acting workshop in the most exaggerated manner possible; Mini-Challenge Winner: Zymba Ding; Mini-Challenge Prize: A ₱20,000 cash tip; Main Challenge: AaWicked Kita: The Rusical; Runway Theme: Kum-Haute Couture; Challenge Winner: Zymba Ding; Challenge Prize: A ₱80,000 cash prize; Bottom Two: John Fedellaga and Popstar Bench; Lip-Sync Song: "Dadalhin" by Regine Velasquez; Eliminated: John Fedellaga; Farewell Message: "Hi Girls, y'all are so TALENTED! Please always Be Kind to each other ♡ John Fedellaga"
27	7	"Super Queens!"	September 18, 2024
For this week's mini-challenge, the queens read each other to filth. Maxie wins the mini-challenge. For the main challenge, the queens makeover a loved one. On the runway, category is Super Queens. Maxie and Zymba Ding receive positive critiques, with Maxie winning the challenge. Angel, Khianna and Popstar Bench receive negative critiques, with Angel being safe. Khianna and Popstar Bench lip-sync to "Get Your Rebel On" by RuPaul. Khianna wins the lip-sync and Popstar Bench sashays away.: Guest Judge: Sharon Cuneta; Alternating Judge: Rajo Laurel; Mini-Challenge: Reading is Fundamental; Mini-Challenge Winner: Maxie; Mini-Challenge Prize: A ₱20,000 cash tip; Main Challenge: Makeover a loved one; Runway Theme: Super Queens; Challenge Winner: Maxie; Challenge Prize: A ₱80,000 cash tip; Bottom Two: Khianna and Popstar Bench; Lip-Sync Song: "Get Your Rebel On" by RuPaul; Eliminated: Popstar Bench; Farewell Message: "Thank you sa inyo na-inspire niyo ako lahat Tangina Galingan pa =P See you Soon Gurls - ♡ Bench"
28	8	"Lip Sync Lalaparuza Smackdown"	September 25, 2024
For this week's mini-challenge, the queens attempt to smash a hanging clay pot while blindfolded in one minute. Myx Chanel wins the mini-challenge. For the main challenge, the queens participate in a Lip-Sync LaLaPaRuZa Smackdown. In the first round, Tita Baby gets picked first and chooses Myx Chanel to lip-sync against. Myx Chanel then chooses "Adrenaline" by RuPaul. Tita Baby wins the lip-sync and Myx Chanel loses. Angel is next to be picked and chooses Khianna to lip-sync against. Khianna then chooses "Loka Loka" by Queen Manica Money. Angel wins the lip-sync and Khianna loses. The final two queens, Maxie and Zymba Ding, lip-sync last to "Hush" by Yassi Pressman and Nadine Lustre. Maxie wins the lip-sync and Zymba Ding loses. The three lip-sync winners, Tita Baby, Angel and Maxie are told that they have the power of the "Golden Balut", which can save one of the three lip-sync losers from elimination. They decided to save Khianna from elimination. Myx Chanel and Zymba Ding then lip-sync to "Ligaw Tingin" by Leah Navarro. Zymba Ding wins the lip-sync and Myx Chanel sashays away.: Alternating Judge: BJ Pascual and Jon Santos; Mini-Challenge: Attempt to smash a hanging clay pot while blindfolded in one minute; Mini-Challenge Winner: Myx Chanel; Mini-Challenge Prize: A ₱20,000 cash tip; Main Challenge: Participate in a Lip-Sync LaLaPaRuZa Smackdown; Lip-Sync Songs: "Adrenaline" by RuPaul, "Loka Loka" by Queen Manica Money and "Hush" by Yassi Pressman and Nadine Lustre; Lip-Sync Winners: Tita Baby, Angel, and Maxie; Lip-Sync Winners Prize: A ₱25,000 cash tip; Bottom Two: Myx Chanel and Zymba Ding; Lip-Sync Song: "Ligaw Tingin" by Leah Navarro; Eliminated: Myx Chanel; Farewell Message:
29	9	"Slay Accla, Slay!"	October 2, 2024
For this week's mini-challenge, the queens answer questions from the previously eliminated queens. Tita Baby wins the mini-challenge. For the main challenge, the queens write, record, and perform verses to "Slay Accla". On the runway, category is Ang Gown-Da (What a Beautiful Gown). Angel, Khianna and Maxie receive positive critiques, with Angel winning the challenge. Tita Baby and Zymba Ding receive negative critiques, and are announced as the bottom two. They lip-sync to "Isa Pang Araw" by Sarah Geronimo. Tita Baby wins the lip-sync and Zymba Ding sashays away.: Guest Judge: Janella Salvador; Alternating Judge: BJ Pascual; Mini-Challenge: Answer questions from the previously eliminated queens; Mini-Challenge Winner: Tita Baby; Mini-Challenge Prize: A ₱20,000 cash tip; Main Challenge: Write, record, and perform verses to "Slay Accla"; Runway Theme: Ang Gown-Da (What a Beautiful Gown); Challenge Winner: Angel; Challenge Prize: A ₱80,000 cash tip; Bottom Two: Tita Baby and Zymba Ding; Lip-Sync Song: "Isa Pang Araw" by Sarah Geronimo; Eliminated: Zymba Ding; Farewell Message: "I was able to show my true self this way. I did so well. Pls pls keep on praying"
30	10	"Grand Finale" "GRAND T.I.T.E! (Totally Impressive Talent Extravaganza!)"	October 9, 2024
For the final challenge of the season, the queens perform an individual performance at the Grand T.I.T.E.: Totally Impressive Talent Extravaganza. On the runway, categories were First Time's a Charm, Art Attack Extravaganza and Come in Your Best Drag. The eliminated queens all return to the runway, where it is announced that Versex is this season's Miss Congeniality. Angel and Tita Baby are eliminated, leaving Khianna and Maxie as the top two queens of the season. They lip-sync to "Lipad ng Pangarap" by Angeline Quinto and Regine Velasquez. It is announced that Maxie is the winner, leaving Khianna as the runner-up.: Alternating Judges: BJ Pascual, Jon Santos and Rajo Laurel; Main Challenge: Perform an individual performance at the Grand T.I.T.E.: Totally Impressive Talent Extravaganza; Runway Themes: First Time's a Charm, Art Attack Extravaganza and Come in Your Best Drag; Miss Congeniality: Versex; Eliminated: Angel and Tita Baby; Final Two: Khianna and Maxie; Lip-Sync Song: "Lipad ng Pangarap" by Angeline Quinto and Regine Velasquez; Runner-up: Khianna; Winner of Drag Race Philippines Season Three: Maxie
