= Masisi (disambiguation) =

Masisi is a town in the Democratic Republic of the Congo.

Masisi may also refer to:

- Mokgweetsi Masisi, the fifth president of Botswana
- Edison Masisi, a diplomat and politician from Botswana and the father of Mokgweetsi Masisi
- Neo Masisi, the First Lady of Botswana and wife of Mokgweetsi Masisi
- Love Masisi, Dutch drag queen
- Masisi Territory, a territory around Masisi in the Democratic Republic of the Congo
