= Benjamin Hudson (disambiguation) =

Benjamin Hudson is an American historian.

Benjamin Hudson may also refer to:

- Ben Hudson, Australian footballer
- Gingzilla, Ben Hudson, Australian drag performer
- Mr Hudson, Benjamin Hudson McIldowie, English musician
- Sir Benjamin Hudson, 3rd Baronet (c. 1665–1730) of the Hudson Baronets
- Benjamin Doug Hudson, American football player
