= 1959 Curitiba riots =

Comb War was a protest that started in 8 December 1959 in the city of Curitiba

The 1959 Curitiba riots refer to three days of violence in December 1959, primarily directed against ethnic Arab immigrants, in the southern Brazilian city of Curitiba. It began on the evening of 8 December, when a local policeman António Tavares bought a comb from the shop of Ahmed Najar, a Lebanese merchant, and asked for a tax receipt. At the time, there was a campaign called Seu Talão Vale um Milhão (Your Bead is Worth a Million) to encourage the issuance of tax receipts for retail purchases. As the cost of the comb was too low, the shopkeeper refused which led to an argument that ended with the policeman fracturing a leg. Violence soon broke out, targeted initially at the shops and businesses of "turcos" ("Turks", referred to Arab Brazilians, not Turkish people or Turkish Brazilians) in the Centenary Bazaar in Tiradentes Square. The bazaar was a stronghold of Syrian-Lebanese traders and merchants. By the second day, rioting spilled over into downtown and hit various public buildings such as the Parana Public Library. The violence only died down on 10 December, with the deployment of the army who reestablished order and imposed a curfew.
