= Regina Voce =

Mexican drag performer

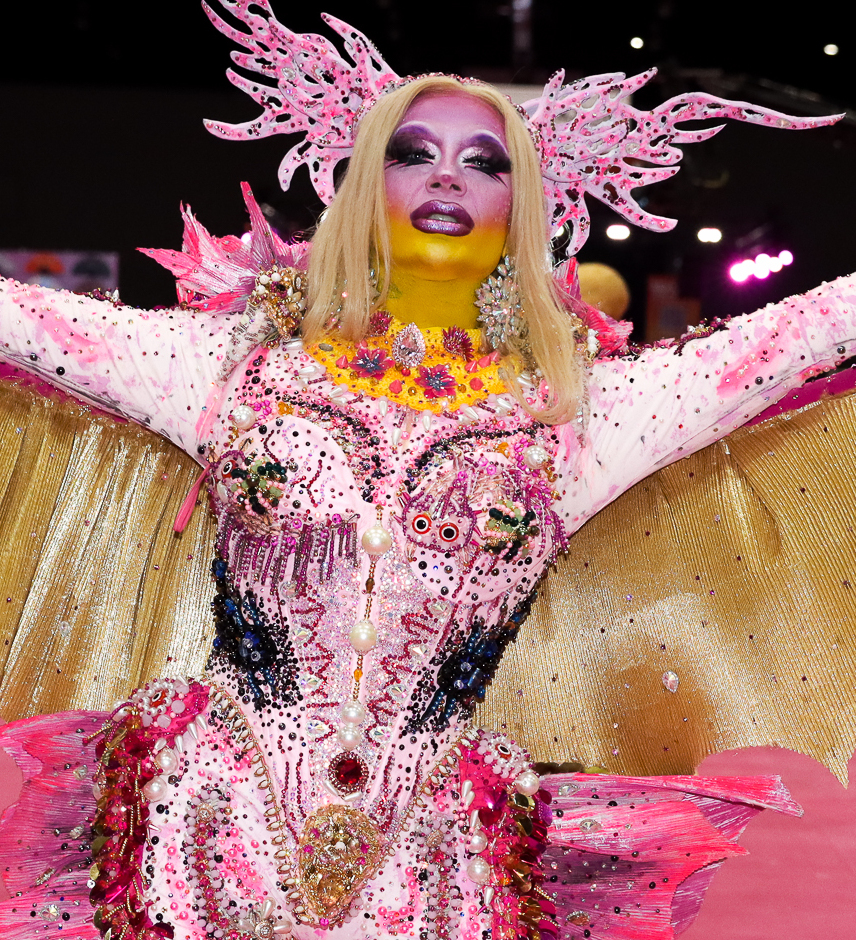
- Regina Voce at RuPaul's DragCon LA, 2024
- Born: Jose Anuar Kuri; Mexico City, Mexico
- Occupation: Drag queen
- Television: Queen of the Universe (season 1); Drag Race México
- Website: reginavoce.com

Regina Voce is the stage name of Jose Anuar Kuri, a Mexican drag performer and singer. She competed on season 1 of Queen of the Universe, the debut season of Drag Race México, and Drag Race México: Latina Royale.

== Career ==
Regina Voce has been described as an actress, dancer, makeup artist, singer, and vocal coach. She was part of a Cirque du Soleil production and was cast in Les Miserables and Rock of Ages.

== Filmography ==
=== Television ===
Year	Title	Role	Notes	Ref
2021	Queen of the Universe	Herself	Contestant (Season 1)	
2023	Drag Race México	Herself	Contestant (Season 1)	
2025	Bring Back My Girls	Herself	Season 4 Episode 5	

=== Films ===
Year	Title	Role	Notes	Ref
2023	Trolls Band Together	Miss Maxine	Latin-American Voice	

== Discography ==
=== As a featured artist ===
Title	Year	Album	Producer
Así Soy Yo (Versión Las Meximamis)	2023	Non-album single	Omar Sosa Latournerie

== See also ==
- List of drag queens
