= Maxie (drag queen) =

Filipino drag queen and singer

Maxie Andreison
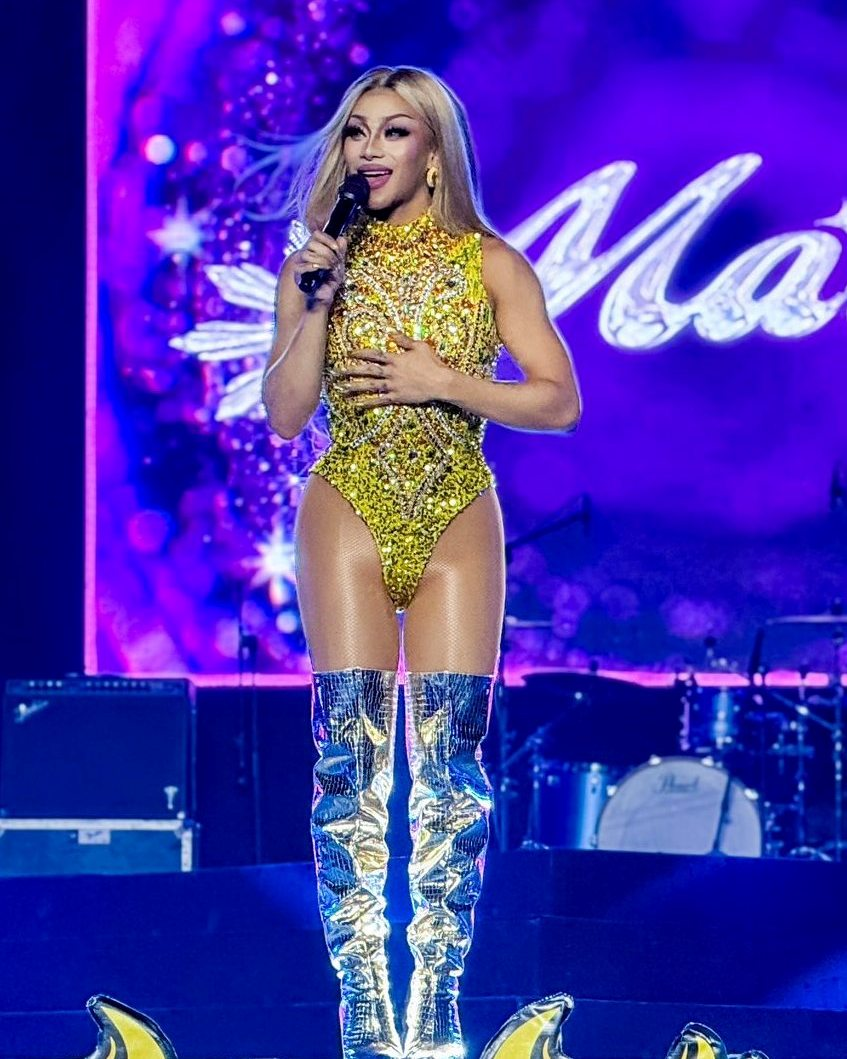
- Maxie in 2025
- Born: Jayvhot Andreison Sarmiento Galang; October 15, 1998 (age 27)
- Other names: Maxie Andreison; Jayvhot G
- Occupations: Drag performer; actor; singer; dancer; songwriter; producer
- Organization: Maxie Productions
- Television: Queen of the Universe (season 2); Drag Race Philippines (season 3); Vibe PH
- Relatives: Angel Galang (sibling)

Jayvhot Andreison Sarmiento Galang (born October 15, 1998), popularly known by his drag name Maxie Andreison or simply Maxie and by his stage name Jayvhot G, is a Filipino drag performer, actor, singer, and activist. He is best known for competing in the second season of Queen of the Universe and winning the third season of Drag Race Philippines. Maxie is also an advocate of HIV/AIDS and the LGBT community.

== Career ==
At the age of 13, Maxie, then known as Jayvhot Galang, made his first TV appearance as a contestant on the Philippine variety and game show Wil Time Bigtime. He received a standing ovation from the audience after covering the songs "And I Am Telling You I'm Not Going" and "Habang May Buhay" (While There's Life) by AfterImage.

In 2013, the then-teenage Maxie was cast in the titular role of the Philippine Educational Theater Association (PETA)'s Maxie The Musicale: Ang Pagdadalaga ni Maximo Oliveros, a theater adaptation of the 2005 coming-of-age comedy-drama film Ang Pagdadalaga ni Maximo Oliveros (English: The Blossoming of Maximo Oliveros). The musical follows a young gay boy trying to navigate life in a tough Manila neighborhood. Maxie received critical acclaim for his performance in the musical. Walter Ang of The Philippine Daily Inquirer gave the play itself a negative review, writing that "the self-indulgent staging is overly long and overly loud" and criticized its "faulty" sound system. However, Ang described Maxie as "irrepressibly ebullient" and added, "The sound system lets up during duets and solos, allowing audiences to hear Galang's deft vocal maneuverings. While he lacks technique for some songs requiring a falsetto, his trailing curlicues and soulful delivery are great, while his torch songs and finale anthem are highlights." Likewise, Rouchelle R. Dinglasan of GMA News wrote in his review, "No doubt a belter like Jayvhot Galang would fit the role of Maxie perfectly in this musical, never mind that this was his first play. The 15-year-old, a self-confessed veteran of amateur singing contests, seemed hesitant to sing in falsetto but when he hit those birit (belted) notes, he definitely carried it with much grace and prowess." Maxie's theater debut inspired his drag name.

As a drag queen, Maxie's first TV appearance was in 2021 at the now-defunct Philippine noontime variety show Tropang LOL's Drag Queendom contest. In 2023, Maxie competed on the second season of the international drag competition series Queen of the Universe and finished in 5th place. In 2024, he won the third season of the Philippine drag reality competition Drag Race Philippines.

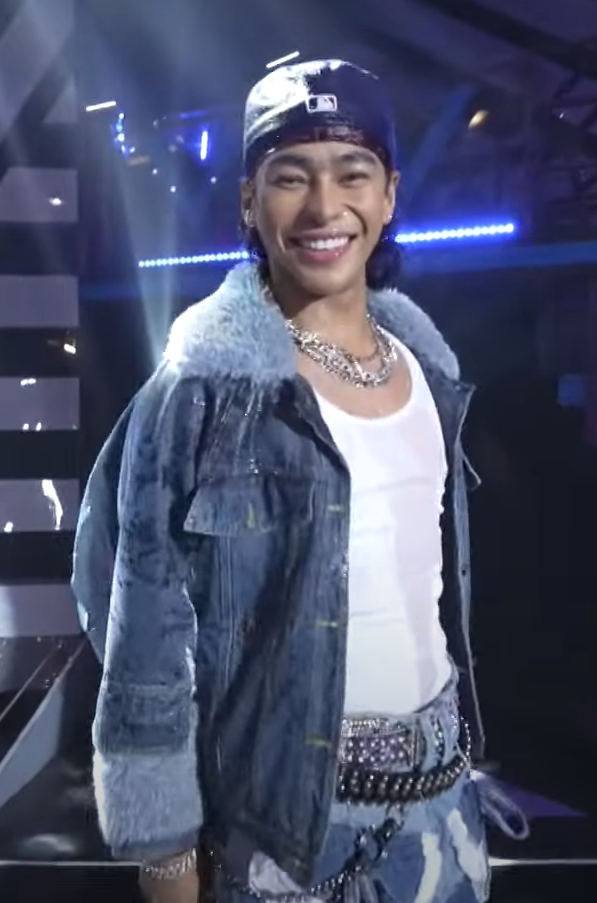
Maxie performing as Jayvhot G

On December 20, 2024, Maxie uploaded a cover of the Skusta Clee song "Dyosa" (Goddess). The cover went viral in the Philippines, accumulating more than 7 million views in a month. Amid its success, Maxie was subjected to online hate speech. On social media, Maxie addressed the idea that he "ruined the fantasy" of the song and questioned why so many of Skusta's fans "got angry" that he covered it. He attributed their anger to homophobia, further asking, "If it's for the straight people, it's only for the straight people? Not allowed for gays?" Numerous netizens came to Maxie's defense online.

Early in 2025, Maxie held his first solo concert, titled Maxieverse: The Concert, over two days at the Aliw Theater and the MOA Sky Amphitheater. On August 9, 2025, he was announced as one of the hosts of TV5's music countdown show Vibe. Later, he was invited to perform at the inaugural Filipino Music Awards on October 21, 2025, where he showcased his hit songs "Tado" and "Halika Na Lika Na".

== Advocacy ==
The media has recognized Maxie as one of the youngest HIV awareness advocates in the Philippines. Since the age of 14, he has worked with organizations such as UNICEF Philippines and the National Youth Commission to share information about health, particularly in the context of the LGBTQ+ community and HIV.

== Personal life ==
Maxie grew up in San Andres Bukid, Manila, raised by his parents, Angel Jr. and Wilma. He has five other siblings, and one of whom is Angel, a trans woman who is also his co-competitor in Drag Race Philippines Season 3. Maxie is a gay man.

On June 28, 2026, he issued an apology for physically assaulting a trans woman in 2023 when a video of the incident resurfaced.

== Discography ==
=== Singles ===
List of Singles
Title	Year
"Akit"	2023
"Tado"	2024
"Love, Laban!"	2025
"Halika Na Lika Na"	2025

=== Collaborations ===
List of collaborations
Title	Year	Other artist(s)	Album
"Dapat Pakak" (Burakpak Version)	2024	Angel, Khianna, Popstar Bench, Versex, Zymba Ding (The Cast of Drag Race Philippines 3)	Non-album single
"Slay Accla"	2024	Angel, Khianna, Tita Baby, Zymba Ding (The Cast of Drag Race Philippines 3)	Non-album single
"Slaysian Royale"	2025	Captivating Katkat, Marina Summers, Precious Paula Nicole	REYN4
"Tear It Up"	2025	Captivating Katkat, Marina Summers, Precious Paula Nicole	REYN4
"High Time"	2025	Captivating Katkat, Marina Summers, Precious Paula Nicole	REYN4
"High Time" (feat. The Cast of Drag Race Philippines: Slaysian Royale) [Top 4 Remix]	2025	Captivating Katkat, Marina Summers, Precious Paula Nicole	REYN4

== Filmography ==
=== Television ===
Year	Title	Network/Platform	Role	Notes
2012	Wil Time Bigtime	TV5	Contestant	
2014	Trenderas	TV5	Jayvhot	
2014	Wattpad Presents: Almost a Cinderella Story	TV5	Qwerty	
2015	Magpakailanman	GMA Network	Topi	Ep. 20 "Rehas ng Pag-ibig"
2015	Karelasyon	GMA Network	Beauty	Ep. 13 "Batang Ina"
2015	#ParangNormal Activity	TV5	Lani's friend	
2021	Tropang LOL	TV5	Contestant	"LOL Drag Queendom"
2023	Queen of the Universe	Paramount+	Contestant	Season 2, 5th place; by default due to medical reasons (6 episodes)
2024	Drag Race Philippines	HBO Go, WOW Presents Plus	Contestant	Season 3, Winner (10 episodes)
2024	Drag Race Philippines: Untucked!	HBO Go, WOW Presents Plus	Himself	Season 3 (10 episodes)
2025	Family Feud	GMA Network	Contestant	Team The Singcredible Four (with Arthur Miguel, Leanne & Naara)
2025	Drag Race Philippines: Slaysian Royale	WOW Presents Plus	Judge	Season 1 (3 episodes)
2025–present	Vibe	TV5	Host	

=== Films ===
Year	Title	Genre	Role	Ref.
2015	#Ewankosau saranghaeyo (i lab yu)	Romantic drama	Sofie	
2017	Sinandomeng	Drama	Shenon	
2017	Maria	Black comedy	Daniel	
2017	Trip Ubusan: The Lolas vs. Zombies	Comedy horror	Melo	
2025	Flower Girl	Fantasy comedy	Mel	

== Awards and nominations ==
Name of the award ceremony, year presented, award category, nominee(s) of the award, and the result of the nomination
Award	Year	Category	Nominee(s) / Work(s)	Result	Ref.
Awit Awards	2024	Best R&B Recording	"Akit"	Shortlisted	
Nylon Manila's Big Bold Brave Awards	2024	Gen-Z Approved Drag Queen	Himself	Nominated	
Nylon Manila's Big Bold Brave Awards	2025	Boldest LGBTQIA+ Icon	Himself	Pending	
Philippines Choice Awards	2025	Promising Artist of the Year	Himself	Won	
VP Choice Awards	2022	Local Drag Queen of the Year	Himself	Nominated	
VP Choice Awards	2024	Local Drag Queen of the Year	Himself	Nominated	
VP Choice Awards	2025	Local Drag Queen of the Year	Himself	Won	
