= Taiga Brava =

Mexican drag queen

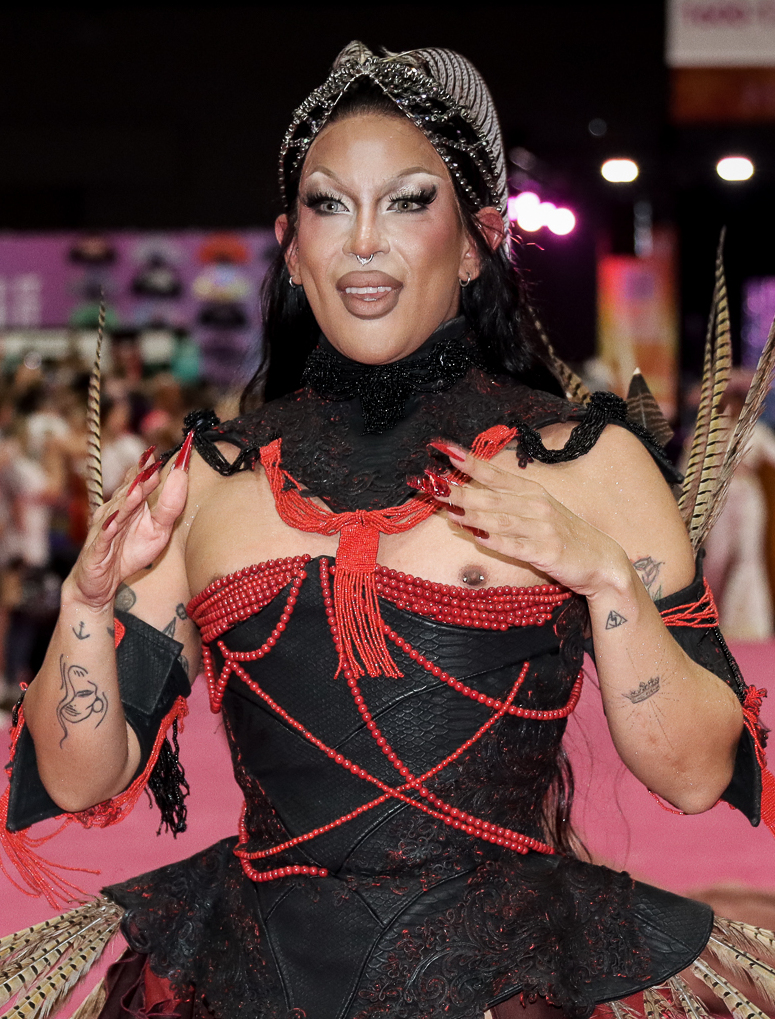
- Taiga Brava at RuPaul's DragCon LA, 2024.
- Born: Julio Iván Lemus Huerta; January 20, 1992 (age 34)
- Occupation: Drag queen
- Television: Queen of the Universe (season 2); Drag Race México

Taiga Brava is the stage name of Julio Iván Lemus Huerta (born January 20, 1992), a Mexican drag queen and singer, known for winning the second season of Queen of the Universe. In 2024, she was announced as the co-host of Drag Race Mexico season 2, alongside Lolita Banana.

== Career ==
Brava has participated in television music contests such as Latin American Idol, La Voz, and Mexico's Got Talent. In 2023, she participated in Queen of the Universe, a drag singing reality competition. After eight episodes, she was crowned the winner, and received the $250,000 prize.

In June 2023, Taiga Brava performed in the CDMX Pride March in Zócalo, Mexico City.

== Filmography ==
=== Television ===
Year	Title	Role	Notes
N/A	Latin American Idol	Contestant	
N/A	La Voz	Contestant	
N/A	Mexico's Got Talent	Contestant	
2023	Queen of the Universe season 2	Herself	Contestant, Winner
2024	Drag Race México	Herself	Judge/Host
2026	Drag Race México: Latina Royale	Herself	Judge/Host

=== Music Videos ===
Year	Title	Producer	Artist
2021	GARAY- Deseo (feat. Taiga Brava)	Toño Coutiño	CARAY-featuring Taiga Bava
2024	TAIGA BRAVA - LA REINA (MV)	Manu Jalil	Taiga Brava
2025	Enrique Ramil & Taiga Brava - Dos Shots	N/A	Enrique Ramil -featuring Taiga Brava
2026	Playa Limbo & Taiga Brava - Última Vez (Video Official)		Playa Limbo- featuring Taiga Brava

== Discography ==
=== As single Artist ===
Year	Title	Album	Writer(s)	Producer(s)
2023	BRAVA	Non-Album/Single	N/A	Velvet Code
2024	La Reina	Non-Album/Single	N/A	Manú Jalil

=== As Featured Artist ===
Year	Title	Album	Writer(s)	Producer(s)
2021	GARAY- Deseo (feat. Taiga Brava)	Non-Album/Single	N/A	Toño Coutiño
2025	Pónmela ya - Alexis Mvgler x Taiga Brava	Non-Album/Single	N/A	
2026	Última vez	Non-Album/Single	N/A	
