= Gingzilla =

Australian drag performer

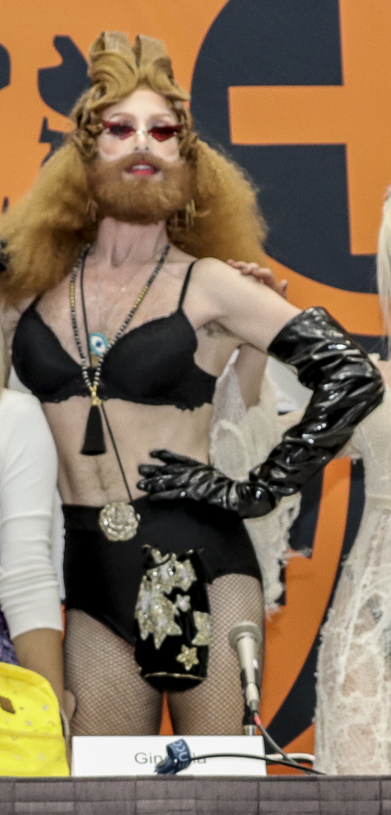
- Gingzilla at RuPaul's DragCon LA, 2022
- Born: Ben Hudson

Gingzilla is the stage name of Ben Hudson, an Australian drag performer.

== Career ==
Gingzilla is a drag performer. She competed on season 1 of Queen of the Universe and has also appeared on The X Factor and America's Got Talent.

== Personal life ==
Gingzilla is based in London.

== Theatre ==
- Glamonster vs the World
