= Grag Queen =

Brazilian entertainer

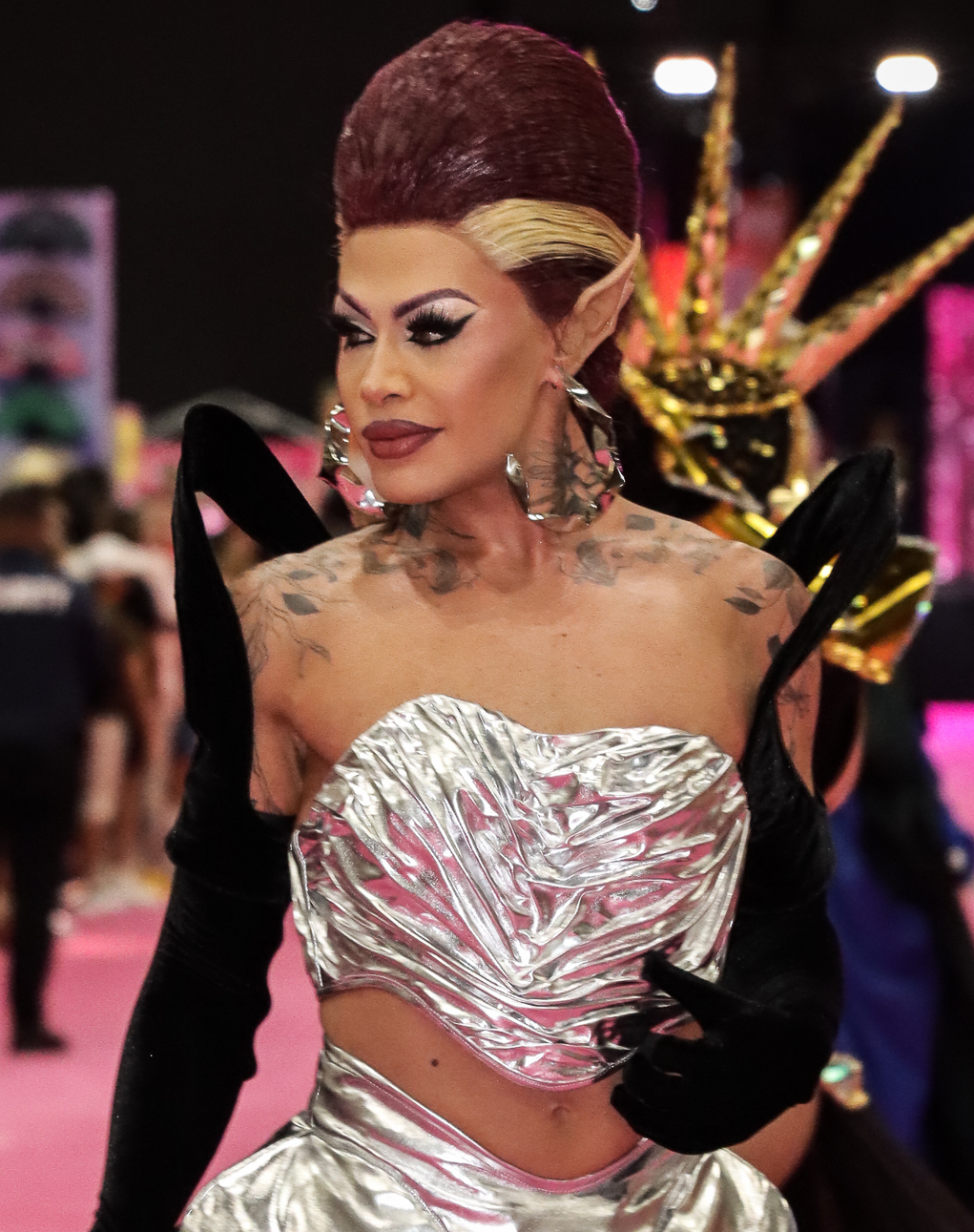
- Grag Queen in 2024
- Born: Grégory Crescencio da Silva Mohd; June 29, 1995 (age 31); Canela, Rio Grande do Sul, Brazil
- Television: Queen of the Universe; Drag Race Brasil

Grégory Crescencio da Silva Mohd, better known by their stage name Grag Queen, is a Brazilian singer, songwriter, drag queen and actor. Grag Queen is most known for winning the first season of Queen of the Universe. In July 2023, she was announced as the host of Drag Race Brasil.

== Career ==
Grag Queen is a drag performer who won the first season of Queen of the Universe. In 2022, she received Gay Times' Honour for Latin American Icon award. Grag Queen has 2.2 million followers on TikTok, as of January 2023.

She has served as the host of Drag Race Brasil since 2023.

=== Music ===
Singles released by Grag Queen include "Party Everyday", "Fim de Tarde", and "You Betta".

== Personal life ==
Grag grew up in a conservative Evangelical Church, in a family of Arab descent. She claims she was a victim of bullying herself. And that, according to her, left her with deep marks. "So, in the end, a child was born and grew up who learned to hate everything that she represented, everything that her existence provided for herself" as she states.

Gay Times has said "she wants to use her newfound platform to raise awareness of anti-LGBTQ+ discrimination and violence in Brazil as a result of President Jair Bolsonaro's homophobic administration".

== Discography ==
=== Extended plays ===
Title	Details
Desperta	Released: 11 November 2021; Label: SB Music; Format: streaming & digital download
Gente Crazy	Released: 12 January 2023; Label: SB Music; Format: streaming & digital download

== Filmography ==
=== Television ===
Year	Title	Role	Notes	Ref.
2022	Queen of the Universe (season 1)	Contestant	Winner	
2023–present	Drag Race Brasil	Host	2 seasons	
2024	Touch-Ups with Raven	Interviewee	1 episode	
2026	Drag Race México: Latina Royale	Guest judge	2 episodes	
