= Ada Vox =

American drag queen, vocalist, and songwriter (born 1993)

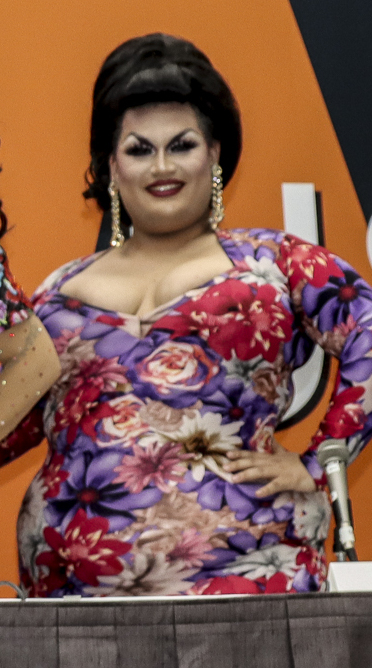
- Ada Vox at RuPaul's DragCon LA, 2022
- Born: Adam Sanders; May 17, 1993 (age 32); San Antonio, Texas, U.S.
- Occupations: Drag queen; songwriter; vocalist
- Website: adavoxofficial.com

Ada Vox is the stage name of Adam Sanders (born May 17, 1993), an American drag queen, songwriter, and vocalist who competed on the sixteenth season of American Idol, and was the runner-up on the first season of Queen of the Universe.

== Career ==
In 2018, Sanders competed as Ada Vox on sixteenth season of American Idol and was a runner-up on the first season of Queen of the Universe. She auditioned for American Idol each season since age 16, and was eliminated during Hollywood Week in the twelfth season. She has been described as the first drag queen competitor and "front-runner" in the show's history.

== Personal life ==
Sanders was born and raised in San Antonio, where he attended South San Antonio High School. He has also lived in Hollywood and Dallas. He has been the victim of "relentless online bullying about his appearance and sexuality".

== See also ==
- List of American Idol finalists
- List of drag queens
- List of people from San Antonio
