= Khianna =

Filipino drag performer

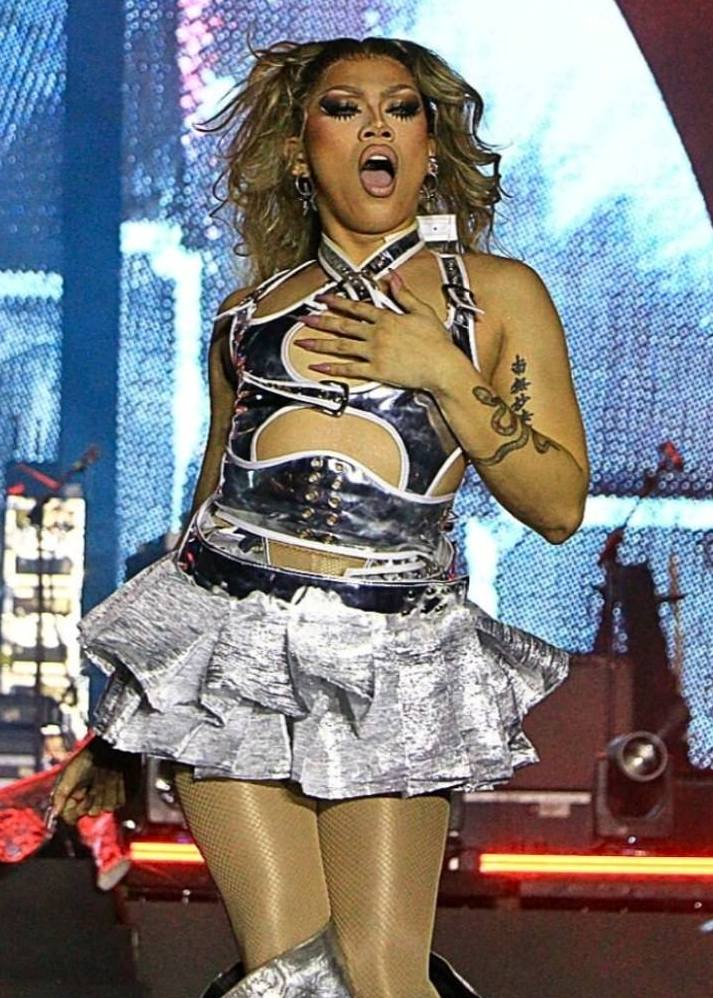
- Khianna in 2025
- Born: Kent Ryan Limpangog; August 3, 2001 (age 24); Cagayan de Oro, Philippines
- Other names: Rhian Morgan, Luzviminda
- Occupation: Drag performer
- Known for: Drag Race Philippines (season 3 runner-up); Slaysian Royale competitor

Khianna, or sometimes referred to as Khianna with a K, is the stage name of Kent Ryan Limpangog (born August 3, 2001), a Filipino drag performer from Mindanao who competed on the third season of Drag Race Philippines and inaugural season of Drag Race Philippines: Slaysian Royale.

== Early life ==
Khianna is of Tagalog and Bisayan descent and has lived in Cavite and Cagayan de Oro. While pregnant with Khianna, her mother assumed she was going to have a girl. However, Khianna was born a boy, but her mother still dressed her in feminine clothing from ages one to three. Khianna first began exploring makeup in the sixth grade. Her passion for drag artistry was sparked by watching Season 8 of RuPaul's Drag Race.

== Career ==
Prior to performing as Khianna, she was known by the stage names Rhian Morgan and Luzviminda. In 2024, Khianna was revealed as part of the cast of the third season of Drag Race Philippines. She won one maxi challenge (Episode 1) and portrayed Baron Geisler in the Snatch Game, eventually placing as the first runner-up to Maxie. In 2025, she was revealed as part of the cast of the inaugural season of Drag Race Philippines: Slaysian Royale.

== Discography ==
=== Collaborations ===
List of collaborations
Title	Year	Other artist(s)	Album
"Dapat Pakak" (Burakpak Version)	2024	Angel, Maxie, Popstar Bench, Versex, Zymba Ding (The Cast of Drag Race Philippines 3)	Non-album single
"Slay Accla"	2024	Angel, Maxie, Tita Baby, Zymba Ding (The Cast of Drag Race Philippines 3)	Non-album single
"Asian Eyyy!" (P-Nice Version)	2025	Arizona Brandy, Bernie, Brigiding, Viñas DeLuxe (The Cast of Drag Race Philippines: Slaysian Royale)	Non-album single

== Filmography ==
=== Television ===
Year	Title	Network/Platform	Role	Notes
2024	Drag Race Philippines	HBO Go, WOW Presents Plus	Contestant	Season 3, Runner-up (10 episodes)
2024	Drag Race Philippines: Untucked!	HBO Go, WOW Presents Plus	Himself	Season 3 (10 episodes)
2025	Drag Race Philippines: Slaysian Royale	WOW Presents Plus	Contestant	Season 1, 5th Placer (9 episodes)
