= Lebanese Brazilians =

Brazilians of Lebanese ancestry

Lebanese Brazilians Líbano-brasileiros البرازيليون اللبنانيون
- (Brazil) (Lebanon)
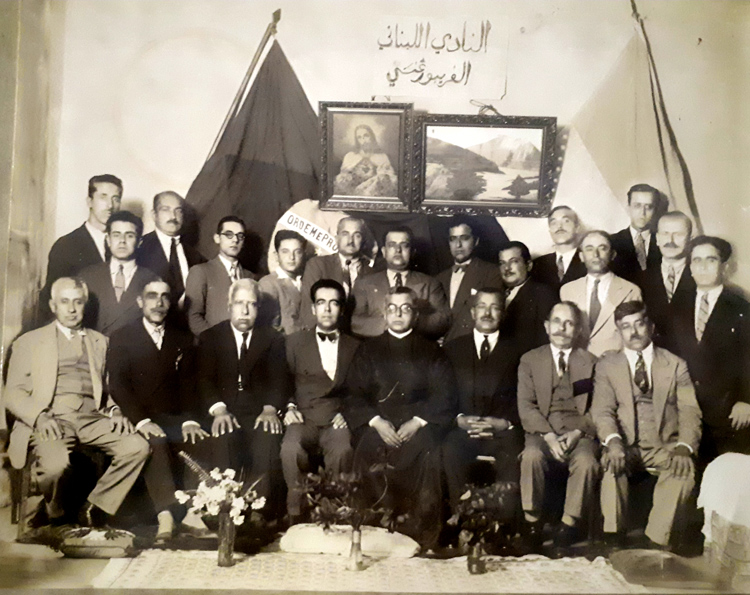
- Lebanese Brazilians in Nova Friburgo, late 19th century

Total population
- 6 million

Regions with significant populations
- Brazil: Mainly in São Paulo, Minas Gerais, Goiás, Rio de Janeiro, Paraná, Ceará, Bahia, Amazonas, Pernambuco, Maranhão, Piauí.

Languages
- Brazilian Portuguese, Lebanese Arabic

Religion
- Catholic Church (65%); Eastern Orthodox Church (30%); Shia Islam, Sunni Islam, Druze (5%)

Related ethnic groups
- Other Arab Brazilians and Asian Brazilians

Lebanese Brazilians (Portuguese: Líbano-brasileiros; Arabic: البرازيليون اللبنانيون) are Brazilians of full or partial Lebanese ancestry, including Lebanese-born immigrants to Brazil. According to the Brazilian Institute of Geography and Statistics (IBGE), they form some of the largest Asian communities in the country, along with other West Asian and East Asian descendants.

Contemporary data on the number of Arab descendants in Brazil is highly inconsistent. The national IBGE census has not questioned the ancestry of the Brazilian people for several decades, considering that immigration to Brazil declined nearly to 0% in the second half of the 20th century. In the last census questioning ancestry, in 1940, 107,074 Brazilians said they were the children of a Syrian, Lebanese, Palestinian, Iraqi or Arab father. The native Arabs were 46,105, while the naturalized Brazilians were 5,447. Brazil had 41,169,321 inhabitants at the time of the census, so Arabs and children were 0.38% of Brazil's population in 1940.

Currently, many sources cite that millions of Brazilians are of Arab descent. Ministry of Foreign Affairs (Itamaraty) claims that there are between 7 and 10 million Lebanese descendants in Brazil. According to a 2008 IBGE survey, 0.9% of the white Brazilians interviewed said they had a family background in Western Asia, which would give about one million people. According to another 1999 survey by the sociologist and former president of the IBGE Simon Schwartzman, only 0.48% of the interviewed Brazilians claimed to have Arab ancestry, a percentage that, in a population of about 200 million of Brazilians, would represent around 960 thousand people.

== Numbers ==
The population of Brazil of either full or partial Lebanese descent is estimated by the Brazilian and Lebanese governments to be around 7 million people.

According to a research conducted by IBGE in 2008, covering only the states of Amazonas, Maranhão,Paraíba, São Paulo, Rio Grande do Sul, Mato Grosso, and Distrito Federal, 0.9% of white Brazilian respondents said they had family origins in the Middle East. If the first figure is correct (7 million), this number of descendants is larger than the population in Lebanon, and the original immigrant population a natural growth of 70 times in less than a century. However, other Middle Eastern countries such as Syria, Jordan, and Palestine also contributed immigrants to Brazil, and nowadays, most of their descendants are of only partial Middle Eastern ancestry.

== History ==
Immigration of the Lebanese to Brazil started in the late 19th century, most of them coming from Lebanon and later from Syria. Since 150,000 Lebanese and Syrians immigrated to Brazil. The immigration to Brazil grew further in the 20th century, and was concentrated in the state of São Paulo, but also extended to Minas Gerais, Goiás, Rio de Janeiro, and other parts of Brazil.

Between 1884 and 1933, 130,000 Lebanese people entered Brazil through the Port of Santos — 65% of them were Catholics (Maronite Catholics and Melkite Catholics), 20% were Eastern Orthodox, 10% were Muslims (Shia, Sunni), and about 5% were Druze. According to French Consulate reports from that time, Lebanese/Syrian immigrants in São Paulo and Santos were 130,000, in Pará 20,000, Rio de Janeiro 15,000, Rio Grande do Sul 14,000, and in Bahia 12,000. During the Lebanese Civil War (1975–90), around 32,000 Lebanese people immigrated to Brazil.

The Arab-Brazil Chamber of Commerce released a census, according to which they estimated the number of descendants living in Brazil at around 12 million. Brazil's foreign ministry estimates between 7 and 10 million Brazilians have a Lebanese ancestor.

== Culture ==
Publishing endeveours began taking root in the Near East in the late 19th century, specifically in Lebanon and Egypt. Emigrants from Lebanon brought with them this journalistic culture to Brazil. In the late 19th century, 95 Arabic language newspapers were published within Brazil. Two of the major centres of Arabic diasporic culture were in Brasil including São Paulo and Rio de Janeiro. This time period is referred to as the nahda. By 1944, the 154 books were published in Arabic in Brazil, mostly by Lebanese migrants per Diogo Bercito.

The Lebanese dish - kibbeh, is popular among the wider Brazilian population and is eaten along with local foods.

== Influence on Brazilian society ==
Despite being estimated at less than 4% of the population of the country, descendants of Lebanese immigrants occupied 10% of the parliament seats in 2014 and 8% in 2015.

Lebanese culture has influenced many aspects of Brazil's culture. In big towns of Brazil it is easy to find restaurants of Lebanese food, and dishes, such as sfiha ("esfiha"), hummus, kibbeh ("quibe"), tahina, tabbouleh ("tabule") and halwa are very well known among Brazilians.

Most Lebanese immigrants in Brazil have worked as traders who sell textiles and clothes and open new markets. Lebanese-Brazilians are well-integrated into Brazilian society. Some even occupied positions of great importance, such as the presidency of the republic, for example Michel Temer. A former mayor of Sao Paulo and Brazil's current Minister of Finance, Fernando Haddad, is also of Lebanese descent.

It is estimated that 10% of the members of Brazilian Congress are descendants of Lebanese emigrants.

== Gallery ==
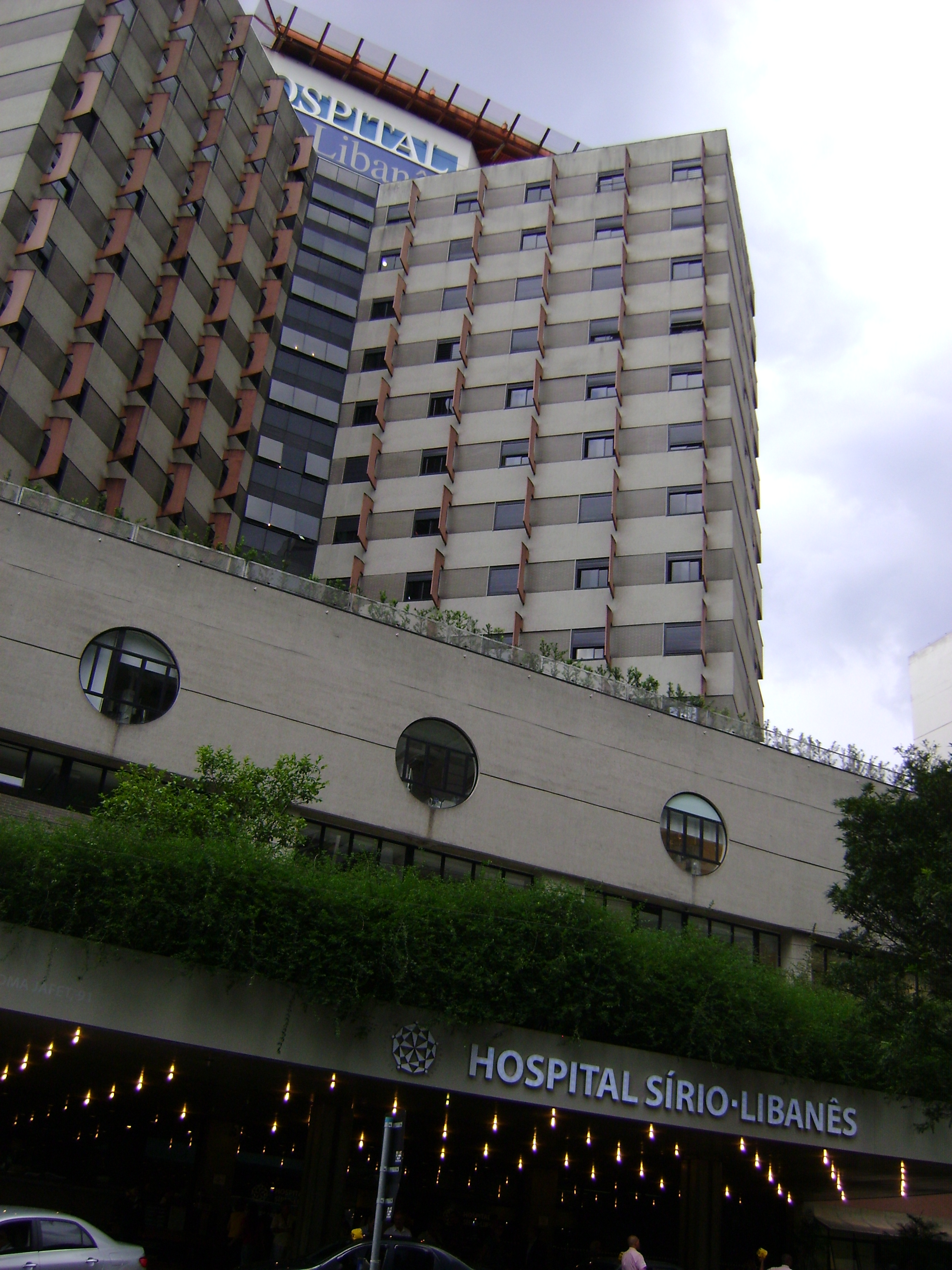
The Hospital Sírio-Libanês (Syrian-Lebanese Hospital) founded by the Lebanese Community in 1931 in São Paulo.

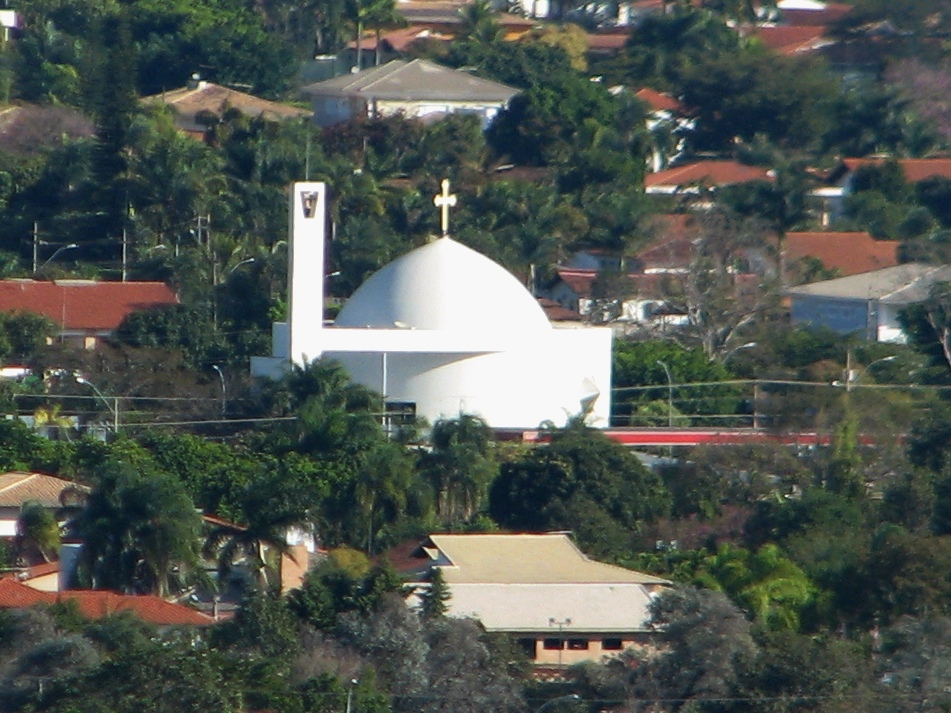
Igreja Ortodoxa São Jorge de Brasília (St. George Eastern Orthodox Church) located in Brasília.

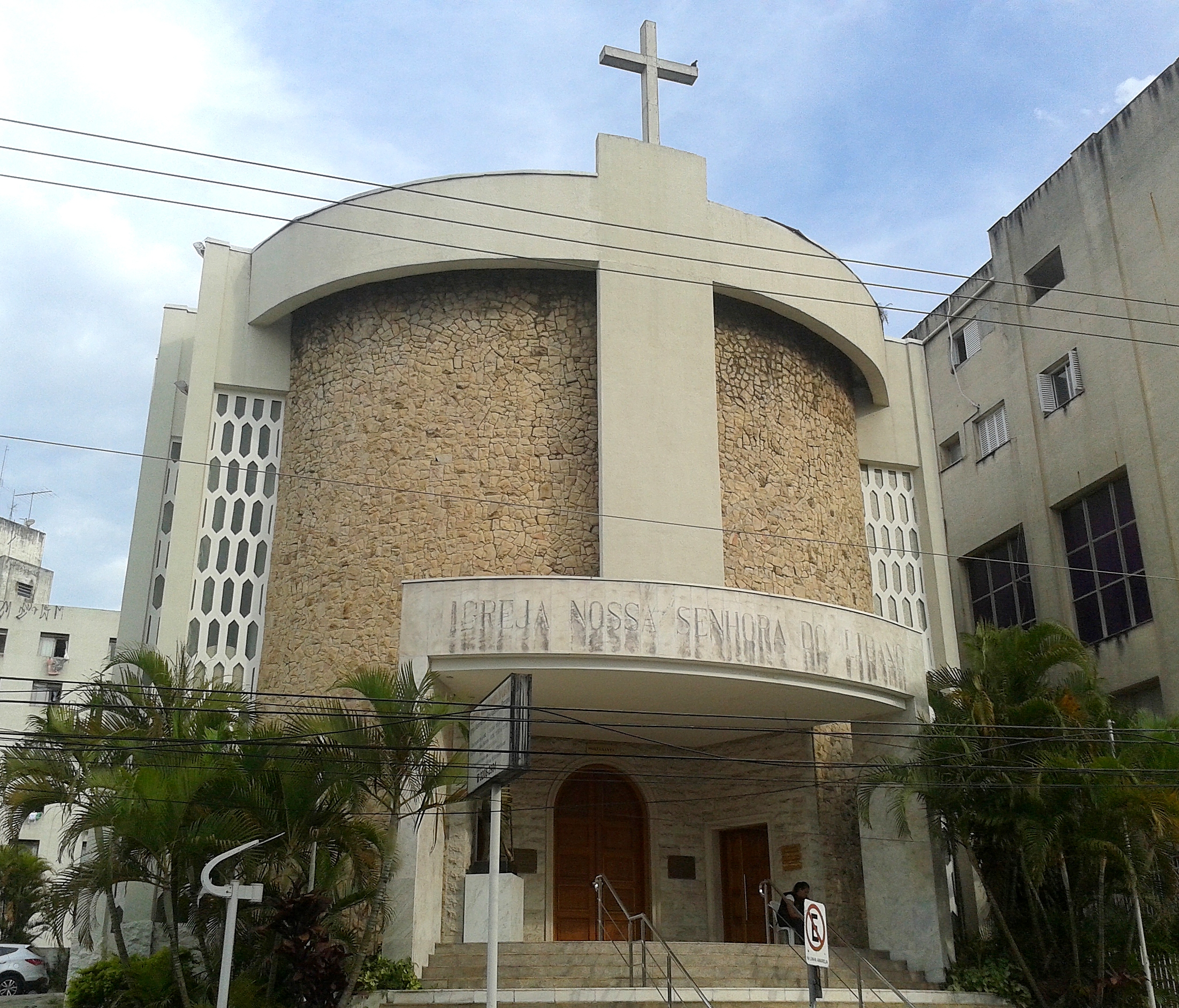
Our Lady of Lebanon Maronite Catholic Cathedral, São Paulo

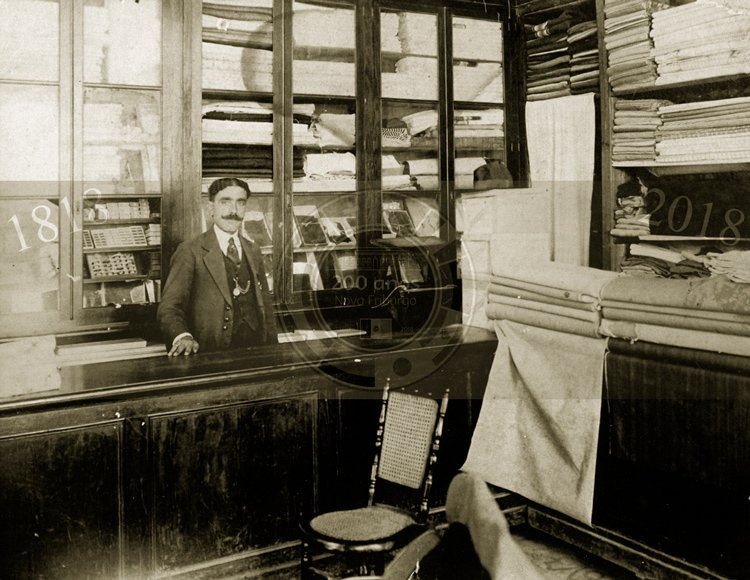
Lebanese Brazilian trader in Nova Friburgo

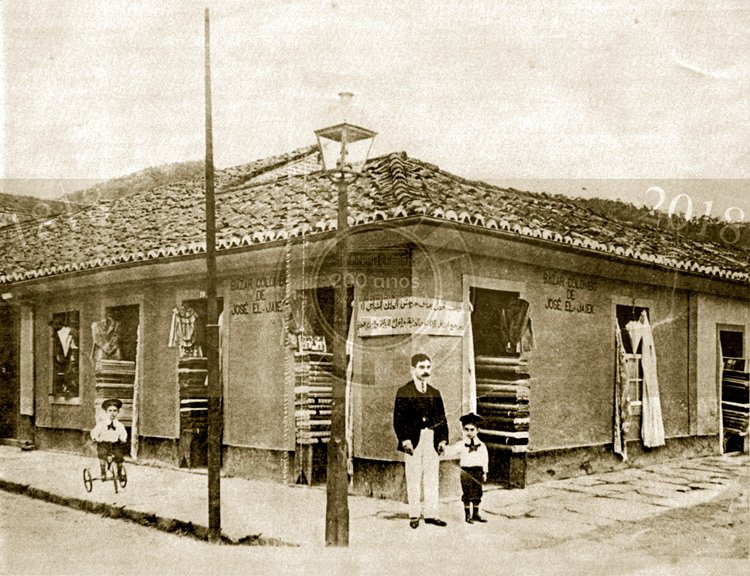
Bazaar of José El Jaick, the oldest Lebanese shop in Brazil

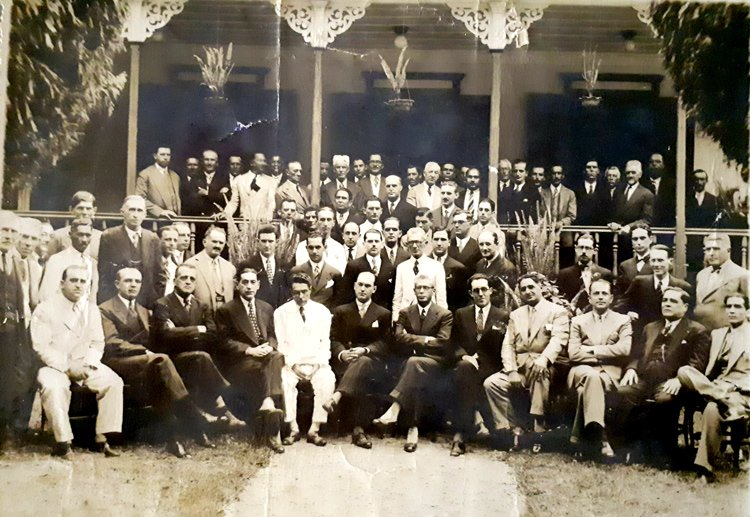
Members of the Lebanon-Friburguense Center, a Lebanese cultural center, Nova Friburgo

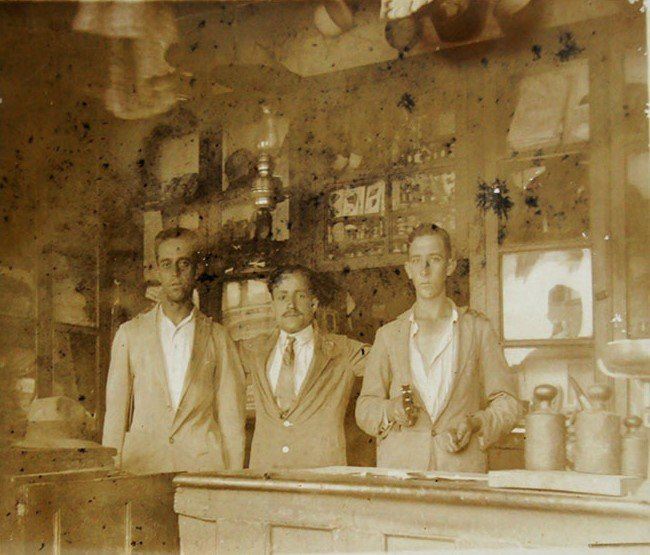
Shop of Lebanese Brazilian Elias Hanna Elias (center), Cantagalo

== See also ==
- Syrian Brazilians
- Arab Brazilians
- Asian Brazilians
- Brazil–Lebanon relations
