= Love Masisi =

Dutch-Haitian drag performer (born 1977)

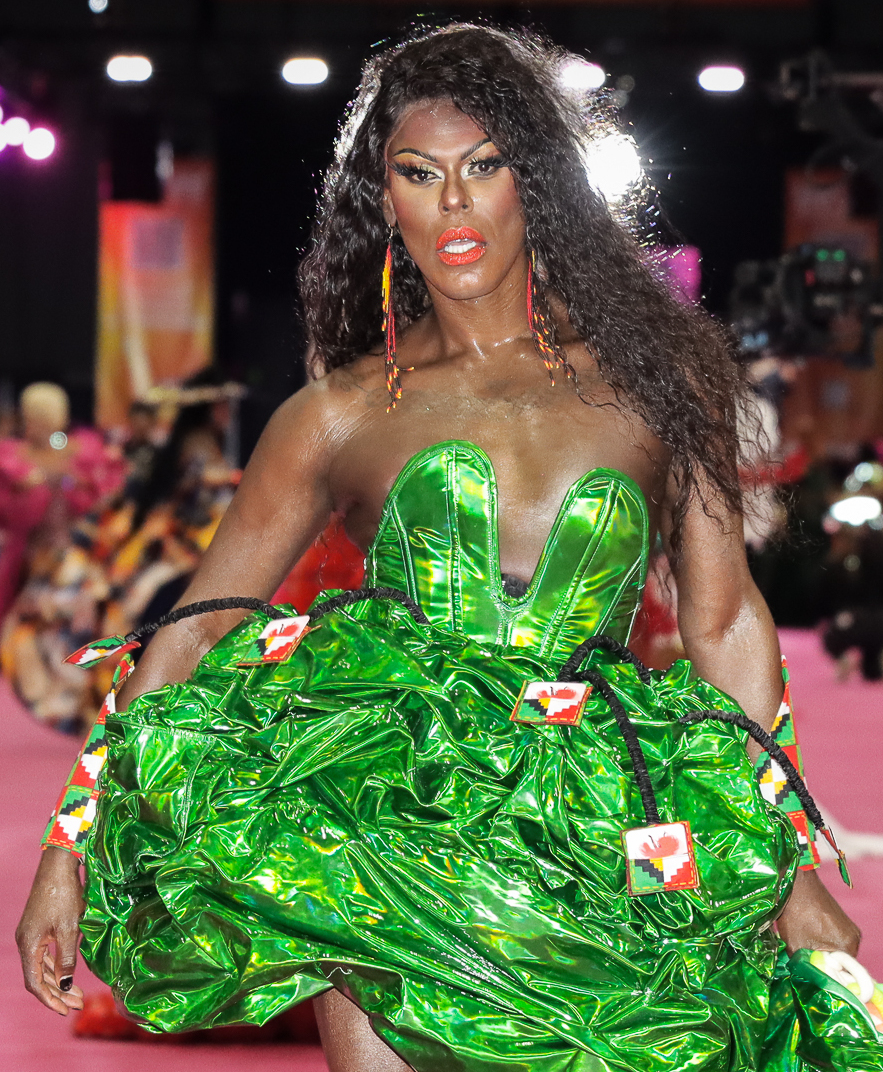
- Love Masisi at RuPaul's DragCon LA, 2024
- Born: Pierre Antoine Alexandre; 9 July 1977 (age 48); Port-au-Prince, Haiti
- Occupation: Drag performer
- Known for: Drag Race Holland (season 2) Queen of the Universe (season 2)

Love Masisi is the stage name of Pierre Antoine Alexandre (born 9 July 1977), a Dutch-Haitian drag performer who has competed on the second season of Drag Race Holland as well as the second season of Queen of the Universe.

Masisi was born in Port-au-Prince, Haiti but moved to New Jersey at the age of eight with his family, and eventually attended Point Park University. Afterwards, he attended a program at the American Musical and Dramatic Academy then toured Japan alongside Gloria Estefan for one year. He established his drag career in Houston, Texas before moving to Amsterdam, where he was cast on the second season of Drag Race Holland, and placed eighth out of ten contestants. He was announced as a part of the cast representing The Netherlands on Queen of the Universe in 2023.

== Filmography ==
- Drag Race Holland
- Queen of the Universe
- Bring Back My Girls (2022)
