= Flower Girl (2025 film) =

2025 Filipino fantasy comedy film

- Theatrical release poster
- Directed by: Fatrick Tabada
- Written by: Fatrick Tabada; Rod Marmol
- Starring: Sue Ramirez; Martin del Rosario; Jameson Blake; Maxie; KaladKaren; Donna Cariaga; Mae Paner
- Cinematography: Kara Moreno
- Production companies: The IdeaFirst Company; OctoberTrain Films; CreaZion Studios
- Distributed by: CreaZion Studios
- Release dates: June 18, 2025 (Philippines); July 27, 2025 (NYAFF)
- Running time: 75 minutes
- Country: Philippines
- Language: Filipino

Flower Girl is a 2025 Filipino fantasy comedy film directed by Fatrick Tabada. It stars Sue Ramirez, Martin del Rosario, Jameson Blake, Maxie Andreison, KaladKaren, Donna Cariaga and Mae Paner. Produced by OctoberTrain Films, CreaZion Studios, and The IdeaFirst Company, it premiered in the Philippines on June 18, 2025.

The film was selected as the closing film of the 2025 New York Asian Film Festival and had its international premiere on July 27, 2025.

== Plot ==
Ena (Sue Ramirez), a commercial model, mocks a trans woman in a public restroom and is cursed by a trans fairy (KaladKaren) to lose her vagina. To reverse the curse, she must find genuine love before the enchanted flower given to her loses its final petal. During her journey, she confronts her own transphobia and reassesses her preconceived notions about gender and identity.

== Cast ==
- Sue Ramirez as Ena
- Martin del Rosario as Robert
- Jameson Blake as Dick
- Maxie as Miko the Florist / assistant Mel
- KaladKaren as the Trans Fairy
- Angel Galang as Lyka
- Donna Cariaga as commercial director
- Iyah Mina (cameo)
- Mae Paner as lady guard/Nova Gina
- Gladys Reyes as Poochy (voice)

== Production ==
The film marks Fatrick Tabada's feature-length directorial debut, transitioning from screenwriter to director to preserve the "unapologetically queer" tone of his screenplay. Filming took place in late 2024 in Metro Manila, with Tabada drawing inspiration from personal experiences and the discrimination faced by trans women. An intimacy coordinator was used, marking a more respectful approach to filming intimate scenes.

== Release ==
The film was released nationwide in the Philippines on June 18, 2025. It was the closing film at the 2025 New York Asian Film Festival, premiering internationally on July 27, 2025.

== Reception ==
Critics praised its bold blend of slapstick, magical realism, and social commentary:

Rolling Stone Philippines called it a "lesson on transphobia" and lauded its irreverence and timing during Pride Month. Tatler Asia noted its "sharp, candy‑coated commentary" about identity and self‑worth, stating “Flower Girl is a rare rom‑com with teeth”.

Januar Junior Aguja of The Philippine Star gave the film 4 stars out of 5 and said; highlighted Tabada's courageous direction, Sue Ramirez's comedic bravery, and the film's respectful handling of intimate scenes.

The Manila Times reported that the premiere earned genuine applause for its fearless storytelling and emotional resonance.

== Themes ==
Flower Girl explores gender identity, transphobia, body politics, and self‑acceptance through a playful yet provocative lens. The film uses comedy to challenge social norms and invites audiences including homophobic or transphobic viewers to question their biases.

== See also ==
- New York Asian Film Festival
