= Angel Galang =

Filipino drag performer (born 2000)

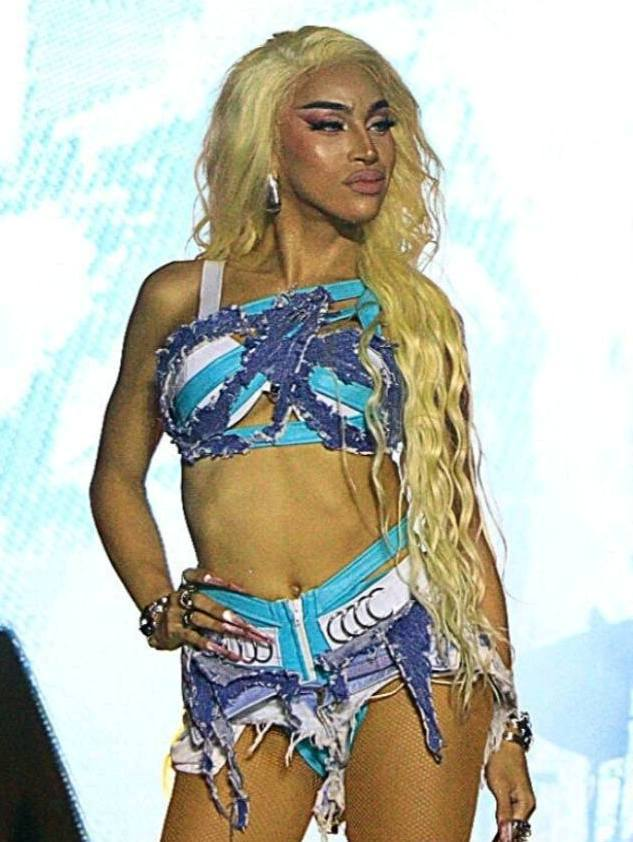
- Angel in 2025
- Born: Angel Sarmiento Galang III; August 16, 2000 (age 26)
- Occupation: Drag performer
- Television: Drag Race Philippines (season 3)
- Relatives: Maxie (sibling)

Angel Sarmiento Galang III, or simply Angel, is a Filipino drag performer who competed on the third season of Drag Race Philippines.

== Career ==
Angel is a drag performer who has performed at O Bar and Rapture. She competed on the third season of Drag Race Philippines, finishing at third place with Tita Baby. During the show, Angel placed in the bottom two of the ball challenge, with Tita Baby, but was spared early elimination from the competition.

== Personal life ==
Angel is a trans woman based in Manila. Her older sibling Maxie competed in and won the same season of Drag Race Philippines.

== Discography ==
=== Collaborations ===
List of collaborations
Title	Year	Other artist(s)	Album
"Dapat Pakak" (Burakpak Version)	2024	Khianna, Maxie, Popstar Bench, Versex, Zymba Ding (The Cast of Drag Race Philippines 3)	Non-album single
"Slay Accla"	2024	Khianna, Maxie, Tita Baby, Zymba Ding (The Cast of Drag Race Philippines 3)	Non-album single

== Filmography ==
=== Television ===
Year	Title	Role	Notes
2024	Drag Race Philippines	Contestant	Season 3, Finalist (10 episodes)
2024	Drag Race Philippines: Untucked!	Herself	Season 3 (10 episodes)

=== Films ===
Year	Title	Role
2025	Flower Girl	Lyka
