= Arab Brazilians =

Brazilians of Arab ancestry

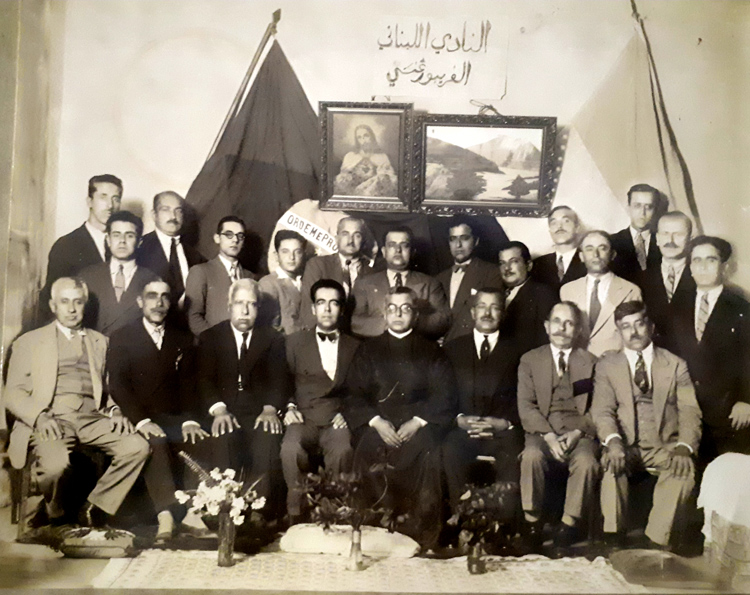
- Lebanese Brazilians in Nova Friburgo, late 19th century

Total population
- 10 million

Regions with significant populations
- São Paulo, Minas Gerais, Rio de Janeiro, Goiás, Rio Grande do Sul, Ceará, Pernambuco

Languages
- Brazilian Portuguese • Arabic

Religion
- Predominantly Christian with Muslim, Druze, and Jewish minorities

Related ethnic groups
- Other Arabs, Asian Brazilians, Arab Americans, Arab Canadians, Lebanese Canadians, Lebanese Australians, Arab Argentines

Arab Brazilians are Brazilian citizens of Arab ethnic, cultural, linguistic heritage and identity. The majority of Arab Brazilians trace their origin to the Levant, primarily from Lebanon, Syria and Israel. Christians are the majority of the Arab Brazilians. The first Syrians and Lebanese arrived in São Paulo around 1880. It is not known exactly when, although the Syrians and Lebanese say that in 1885 there was a small core of peddlers working in the market square. By 1920, the census listed 50,246 Syrians and Lebanese in Brazil, 38.4% (2/5) of these in the state of São Paulo. The 1940 census enumerated 48,614 Syrians, Lebanese and other related groups with a decrease of approximately 1647 people. As immigration almost ceased after 1929 and the colony aged, it is surprising that the decline was not even greater. The trend of the period between 1920 and 1940 was the continuous concentration of Syrians and Lebanese in São Paulo. Almost half (49.3%) of Syrians and Lebanese residents in Brazil lived in São Paulo.

Contemporary data on the number of Arab descendants in Brazil is highly inconsistent. The national IBGE census has not questioned the ancestry of the Brazilian people for several decades, considering that immigration to Brazil declined almost to zero in the second half of the 20th century. In the last census questioning ancestry, in 1940, 107,074 Brazilians said they were the children of a Syrian, Lebanese, Iraqi or Arab father. The native Arabs were 46,105 and the naturalized Brazilians, 5,447. Brazil had 41,169,321 inhabitants at the time of the census, so Arabs and children were 0.38% of Brazil's population in 1940. Currently, many sources cite that millions of Brazilians are of Arab descent. Itamaraty claims that there are between 7 and 10 million Lebanese descendants in Brazil. However, independent research, based on the interviewee's self-declaration, found much smaller numbers. According to a 2008 IBGE survey, 0.9% of the white Brazilians interviewed said they had a family background in Western Asia, which would give about one million people. According to another 1999 survey by the sociologist and former president of the Brazilian Institute of Geography and Statistics (IBGE) Simon Schwartzman, only 0.48% of the interviewed Brazilians claimed to have Arab ancestry, a percentage that, in a population of about 200 million of Brazilians, would represent around 960,000 people.

== History ==
=== Immigration to Brazil ===
Arab immigration to Brazil started in the 1890s as Lebanese and Syrian people fled the political and economic instability caused by the collapse of the Ottoman Empire; the majority were Christian but there were also many Muslims. Immigration peaked around World War II. Arab immigrants were among the largest non-European immigrant groups to Brazil. Groups in Brazil who may have protested against the immigration of non-Europeans were less concerned, since many of the immigrants from Syria, Lebanon, Israel and North Africa were Christians. Fewer than 200,000 Middle Eastern and Arab immigrants arrived in Brazil, who eventually dispersed in many different cities.

By the 19th century, most of the immigrants arrived from Lebanon and Syria, and later from other parts of the Arab world. When they were first processed in the ports of Brazil, they were counted as Turks because they carried passports issued by the Turkish Ottoman Empire that ruled the present day territories of Lebanon and Syria. There were many causes for Arabs to leave their homelands in the Ottoman Empire; overpopulation in Lebanon, conscription in Lebanon and Syria, and religious persecution by the Ottoman Turks. Arab immigration to Brazil grew also after World War I and the rest of the 20th century, and concentrated in the states of São Paulo, Mato Grosso do Sul, Minas Gerais, Goiás, and Rio de Janeiro.

Most Arab immigrants in Brazil were Christians, Muslims being a minority. Intermarriage between Brazilians of Arab descent and other Brazilians, regardless of ethnicity or religious affiliation, is very high; most Brazilians of Arab descent only have one parent of Arab origin. As a result of this, the new generations of Brazilians of Arab descent show marked language shift away from Arabic. Only a few speak any Arabic, and such knowledge is often limited to a few basic words. Instead the majority, especially those of younger generations, speak Portuguese as a first language.

The Brazilian and Lebanese governments claim there are 7 to 10 million Brazilians of Lebanese descent. Also, the Brazilian government claims there are 4 million Brazilians of Syrian descent. Similarly, it is reported that there are 5 to 7 million Brazilians of Jordanian descent.

However, those numbers might be an overestimate, given that an official survey conducted by the Brazilian Institute of Geography and Statistics (IBGE) in 2008 showed that less than 1 million Brazilians claimed any Middle-Eastern origin (only 0.9% of white Brazilian respondents said they had family origins in the Middle East).

== Arabic influence in Brazil ==
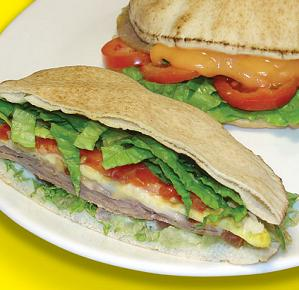
Beirute, an Arab-Brazilian sandwich.

Arab immigration has influenced many aspects of Brazil's culture – besides and beyond the Arabic influence inherited via Portugal, as, for instance, some Portuguese words of Arabic origin.

In many cities across the country, it is easy to find restaurants that cook Arab food; and Arab dishes, such as sfihas (Portuguese esfirra), tabbouleh (Portuguese tabule), kibbeh (Portuguese quibe), hummus, tahina and halwa are very well known among Brazilians.

Most Arab immigrants in Brazil have worked as traders, roaming the vast country to sell textiles and clothes and open new markets. This economic history can be seen today in the ways that the São Paulo-based Arab Brazilian Chamber of Commerce has gained recognition in increasing Brazilian exports to the Arab world.

Arab-Brazilians are well integrated into Brazilian society. Today, only a minority of Arab Brazilians still know and speak the Arabic language, the vast majority of them being monolingual Portuguese speakers.

Many important Brazilians are of Arab descent, including important politicians such as Paulo Maluf, Geraldo Alckmin, Gilberto Kassab, former President Michel Temer, José Maria Alkmin, artists, writers (for instance Raduan Nassar) and models.

== Notable Arab Brazilians ==
- Joseph Safra, banker
- Moise Safra, billionaire businessman
- Edmond Safra, banker
- Adib Domingos Jatene, physician
- Amyr Klink, sailor
- João Saad, founder of Grupo Bandeirantes de Comunicação
- Antônio Houaiss, writer and philologist
- Arnaldo Jabor, film director, screenwriter and producer
- Alfredo Saad-Filho, economist
- Tania Khalill, actress
- Elie Horn, businessman, owner of Cyrela Brazil Realty
- Fernando Haddad, politician and former mayor of São Paulo
- Branco, football world champion
- Carlos Ghosn, businessman (former CEO of Renault and Nissan)
- Bruna Abdullah, Hindi and Tamil language film actress
- Alberto Dualib, businessman
- Beatriz Haddad Maia, tennis player
- Rafael Leitão, Brazilian chess grandmaster
- Guilherme Afif Domingos, politician
- Paulo Maluf, politician and former governor of São Paulo
- Geraldo Alckmin, current Vice President of Brazil and former Governor of São Paulo
- Gilberto Kassab, politician and former mayor of São Paulo
- João Bosco, musician
- José Maria Alkmin, politician, former Vice-President of Brazil under Castelo Branco
- Juliana Paes, actress
- Grag Queen, singer, drag queen, Queen of the Universe winner, and host of Drag Race Brasil
- Luciana Gimenez Morad, model and TV entertainer
- Malu Mader, actress
- Marcelle Bittar, model
- Mário Zagallo, football player and coach world champion
- Michel Temer, politician, former President of Brazil
- Beto Carrero, entertainer, creator of the Beto Carrero World Park
- Raduan Nassar, writer
- Fagner, singer
- Sabrina Sato Rahal, model and TV entertainer
- Leda Nagle, journalist, writer and television presenter
- Farid Zablith Filho, olympic swimmer
- Tony Kanaan, race car driver
- Wallid Ismail, martial artist, World class Brazilian jiu-jitsu practitioner, famous for choking Royce Gracie unconscious
- Felipe Nasr, F1 Driver.
- Ibrahim Abi-Ackel, politician
- Tina Isa, honour killing and filicide victim

== See also ==
- Asian Brazilians
- Arab diaspora
- Demographics of Brazil
- White Latin Americans
- Lebanese Brazilians
