= Your Tita Baby =

Drag performer

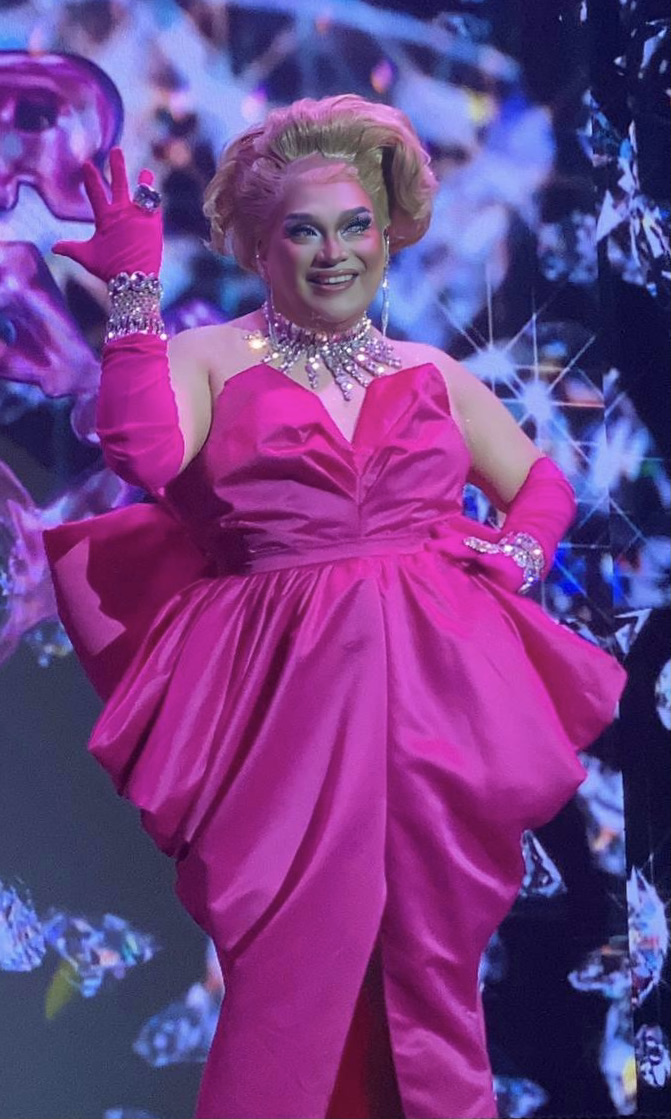
- Your Tita Baby performing in 2024
- Born: Ryan Pronstroller; January 7, 1978 (age 48); Marikina City, Philippines
- Other name: Tita Baby
- Occupation: Drag performer
- Television: Drag Race Philippines (Season 3)

Your Tita Baby, or simply Tita Baby, is the stage name of Ryan Pronstroller, a drag performer who competed on the third season of Drag Race Philippines.

== Career ==
Drag performer and content creator Your Tita Baby competed on the third season of Drag Race Philippines. She placed in the top of the advertisement, Rusical, and Snatch Game challenges. Overall, Your Tita Baby was a top four finalist.

Probe, a pioneering Philippine media company, partnered with Your Tita Baby as one of their "truth defenders" to combat disinformation through an innovative fact-checking campaign called Tsek/Eks. This partnership aims to bridge communication gaps and engage a wider audience in discussions about history and politics, expanding their reach and impact in the digital age.

== Personal life ==
Your Tita Baby was born on January 7, 1978 in Marikina City and is currently based in San Juan City.

== Discography ==
=== Collaborations ===
List of collaborations
Title	Year	Other artist(s)	Album
"Dapat Pakak" (Hard Pakakers Version)	2024	John Fedellaga, J Quinn, Myx Chanel, Yudipota (The Cast of Drag Race Philippines 3)	Non-album single
"Slay Accla"	2024	Angel, Khianna, Maxie, Zymba Ding (The Cast of Drag Race Philippines 3)	Non-album single

== Filmography ==
=== Television ===
Year	Title	Role	Network
2024	Drag Race Philippines Season 3	Contestant	HBO Go / WOW Presents Plus
2024	Drag Race Philippines Season 3: Untucked!	Contestant	HBO Go / WOW Presents Plus

=== Music video ===
Year	Title	Singer
2024	"Room"	Stell
