= Queen of the Universe season 2 =

Queen of the Universe
- Season 2
- Promotional poster for season two with original release date
- Hosted by: Graham Norton
- Judges: Trixie Mattel; Michelle Visage; Mel B; Vanessa Williams
- No. of contestants: 10
- Winner: Taiga Brava
- Runner-up: Trevor Ashley
- No. of episodes: 8

Release
- Original network: Paramount+
- Original release: June 2 – June 22, 2023

Season chronology
- ← Previous; Season 1

The second season of Queen of the Universe premiered on June 2, 2023, through the streaming service Paramount+.

The winner of the second season of Queen of the Universe was Taiga Brava from Mexico, with Trevor Ashley from Australia finishing as the runner-up.

== Production ==
On February 15, 2022, a press release from Paramount+ announced that the television series was renewed for a second season. Graham Norton has returned as the host of the series with Trixie Mattel, Michelle Visage, and Vanessa Williams returning as judges, except for Leona Lewis, who was replaced by Mel B.

The cast was announced on February 22, 2023, with a total of ten contestants, including Aura Eternal, a runner-up from the second season of Drag Race Italia, and Love Masisi, a contestant from the second season of Drag Race Holland.

== Contestants ==
Ages, names, and cities stated are at the time of filming.

Contestants of Queen of the Universe season 2
Contestant	Hometown	Outcome
Taiga Brava	Cancún, Mexico	Winner
Trevor Ashley	Sydney, Australia	Runner-up
Aura Eternal	Palermo, Italy	3rd place
Jazell Royale (Note: Jazell Barbie Royale is referred to as Jazell Royale on the show.)	Orlando, United States	4th place
Maxie (Note: Maxie Andreison is referred to as Maxie on the show.)	Manila, Philippines	5th place (Note: Maxie left the competition due to medical reasons.)
Viola (Note: Viola Viagra is referred to as Viola on the show.)	Coventry, United Kingdom	6th place
Militia Scunt	San Francisco, United States	7th place
Love Masisi	Amsterdam, Netherlands	8th place
Miss Sistrata	Tel Aviv, Israel	9th place
Chloe V	Rio de Janeiro, Brazil	10th place

== Contestants progress ==
Legend:

Taiga Brava won Queen of the Universe season 2.
Trevor Ashley was the runner-up.
SAFE indicates that the contestant advanced to the following episode.
BTM (Bottom) indicates that the contestant was up for elimination.
SAVE indicates that the contestant was saved.
ELIM (Eliminated) indicates that the contestant was eliminated.
WDR (Withdraw) indicates that Maxie was removed from the competition due to an injury.
Guest indicates that the contestant returned as a guest.

Progress of contestants including placements in each episode
Contestant	Episode								
Contestant	1	2		3	4	5	6	7	8
Taiga Brava	BTM		SAVE	SAFE	SAFE	BTM	SAFE	SAFE	Winner
Trevor Ashley	SAFE			BTM	SAFE	SAFE	BTM	BTM	Runner-up
Aura Eternal		BTM	SAVE	SAFE	BTM	BTM	BTM	SAFE	Eliminated
Jazell Royale	SAFE			SAFE	SAFE	SAFE	SAFE	ELIM	Guest
Maxie		BTM	SAVE	SAFE	SAFE	SAFE	WDR		Guest
Viola	SAFE			SAFE	SAFE	ELIM			Guest
Militia Scunt		SAFE		SAFE	ELIM				Guest
Love Masisi		BTM	SAVE	ELIM					Guest
Miss Sistrata	BTM		ELIM						
Chloe V		ELIM							Guest

== Performance shows ==
=== Round 1: No Place Like Home (June 2) ===
Queens were to impress the judges and in-studio audience during these two-part premiere episodes. At the end of this round, the Queen with the least in-studio audience votes was eliminated and the in-studio audience saved four Queens, leaving the bottom five Queens to perform in a Spice Girl Showdown to stay in the competition, where the judges eliminated one more Queen.

Performances on the first episode
Queen	Order	Song	Result
Taiga Brava	1	''Everything I Wanted"	Bottom five
Trevor Ashley	2	"Get the Party Started"	Safe
Miss Sistrata	3	"Diva"	Bottom five
Viola	4	"Lay Me Down"	Safe
Jazell Royale	5	"Easy on Me"	Safe

Performances on the second episode
Queen	Order	Song	Result
Aura Eternal	1	"Take Me to Church"	Bottom five
Maxie	2	"Do It Like a Dude"	Bottom five
Chloe V	3	"Creep"	Eliminated
Militia Scunt	4	"Just Got Paid"	Safe
Love Masisi	5	"Nails, Hair, Hips, Heels"	Bottom five
Spice Girl Showdown details
Aura Eternal	-	"Wannabe"	Saved
Love Masisi	-	"Wannabe"	Saved
Maxie	-	"Wannabe"	Saved
Miss Sistrata	-	"Wannabe"	Eliminated
Taiga Brava	-	"Wannabe"	Saved

=== Round 2: Two Queens, One Song (June 9) ===
Last week's top Queen Viola and bottom Queen Taiga Brava were paired up and paired the other Queens. Four pairs wrote an original song based on four genres. At the end of this round, the audience saved three pairs of Queens and the remaining pair had to perform a "Survival Song" to stay in the competition, where the judges eliminated one more Queen.

Performances on the third episode
Queen	Order	Genre	Song	Result
Taiga Brava & Viola	1	Pop	"T4B"	Safe
Aura Eternal & Maxie	2	R&B	"This Hot"	Safe
Jazell Royale & Militia Scunt	3	Ballad	"Gagging For You"	Safe
Love Masisi & Trevor Ashley	4	Rock	"Rock Hard"	Bottom two
Survival Sing-Off details
Love Masisi	1	-	"And I Am Telling You I'm Not Going"	Eliminated
Trevor Ashley	2	-	"This Is Me"	Saved

=== Round 3: My First Time (June 16) ===
At the end of this round, the in-studio audience saved five Queens, leaving one of the bottom two Queens eliminated by the judges.

Performances on the fourth episode
Queen	Order	Song	Result
Maxie	1	"Flashdance... What a Feeling"	Safe
Militia Scunt	2	"Love Is a Losing Game"	Eliminated
Aura Eternal	3	"Family Affair"	Bottom two
Taiga Brava	4	"Praying"	Safe
Jazell Royale	5	"Save the Best for Last"	Safe
Viola	6	"Don't Stop Me Now"	Safe
Trevor Ashley	7	"The Rose"	Safe

=== Round 4: Future Disco 3000 (June 22) ===
This round, top six Queens competed in three Disco Diva Showdown. After each Showdown, the audience saved one Queen and the other Queen had to perform a "Survival Song" to stay in the competition, where the judges eliminated one Queen.

Performances on the fifth episode
Disco Diva Showdown details
Queen	Showdown	Order	Song	Result
Taiga Brava	1	1	"About Damn Time"	Bottom three
Jazell Royale	1	2	"React"	Safe
Aura Eternal	2	3	"Stupid Love"	Bottom three
Trevor Ashley	2	4	"Me Too"	Safe
Viola	3	5	"It's a Sin"	Bottom three
Maxie	3	6	"Physical"	Safe
Survival Sing-Off details
Aura Eternal	-		"Sisters Are Doin' It for Themselves"	Saved
Taiga Brava	-		"Sisters Are Doin' It for Themselves"	Saved
Viola	-		"Sisters Are Doin' It for Themselves"	Eliminated

=== Round 5: Exposed! (June 22) ===
Maxie couldn't continue in the competition due to an injury. At the end of this round, the in-studio audience saved two Queens, leaving one of the bottom two Queens eliminated by the judges, but the judges saved both the Queens in bottom two.

Performances on the sixth episode
Queen	Order	Song	Result
Trevor Ashley	1	"Better the Devil You Know"	Bottom two
Taiga Brava	2	"All by Myself"	Safe
Aura Eternal	3	"Someone You Loved"	Bottom two
Jazell Royale	4	"Imagine"	Safe
Maxie	-	-	Withdraw

=== Round 6: Semi-Final (June 22) ===
Top four Queens were paired up with a mentor from Pop Diva Panel. At the end of the semi-finals round, the audience sends two Queens to the finals, while the judges save one of the remaining two Queens, but the judges votes was a tie. The Queen with the least in-studio audience votes was eliminated.

Performances on the semi-final episode
Queen	Mentor	Order	Song	Result
Taiga Brava	Mel B	1	"Good Ones"	Safe
Jazell Royale	Vanessa Williams	2	"I'm a Slave 4 U"	Bottom two
Aura Eternal	Michelle Visage	3	"Left Outside Alone"	Safe
Trevor Ashley	Trixie Mattel	4	"River Deep – Mountain High"	Bottom two
Survival Sing-Off details
Jazell Royale	-		"Strong Enough"	Eliminated
Trevor Ashley	-		"Strong Enough"	Saved

=== Round 7: Party All Over the World - Finale (June 22) ===
The final three Queens perform two songs, and one Queen takes home the top prize of $250,000 and the title of Queen of the Universe.

Performances on the finale episode
Queen	Order	Song	Order	Song	Result
Trevor Ashley	1	"It's Raining Men"	4	"Maybe This Time"	Runner-up
Taiga Brava	2	"True Colors"	6	"Chandelier"	Winner
Aura Eternal	3	"Sissy That Walk"	5	"Without You"	Third place

== Episodes ==
No. overall	No. in season	Title	Original release date	Prod. code
7	1	"Bigger Hits, Glossier Lips and Massive T**s"	June 2, 2023	201
8	2	"A Spicy Twist"	June 2, 2023	202
9	3	"Double Trouble"	June 8, 2023	203
10	4	"Dragging up the Past"	June 16, 2023	204
11	5	"Who's Ready for a Dance Off?"	June 22, 2023	205
12	6	"Exposed!"	June 22, 2023	206
13	7	"Battle of the Divas"	June 22, 2023	207
14	8	"The Winner Is..."	June 22, 2023	208
