= Queen of the Universe season 1 =

Queen of the Universe
- Season 1
- Promotional poster for season one.
- Hosted by: Graham Norton
- Judges: Leona Lewis; Trixie Mattel; Michelle Visage; Vanessa Williams
- No. of contestants: 14
- Winner: Grag Queen
- Runner-up: Ada Vox
- No. of episodes: 6

Release
- Original network: Paramount+
- Original release: December 2 – December 30, 2021

Season chronology
- Next → Season 2

The first season of Queen of the Universe is premiered on December 2, 2021, through streaming service Paramount+.

The winner of the first season of Queen of the Universe was Grag Queen from Brazil, with Ada Vox from the United States finishing as the runner-up.

== Production ==
On February 24, 2021, Paramount Global and Paramount+ announced the international drag-singing competition Queen of the Universe from World of Wonder, the producers behind RuPaul’s Drag Race, with cast members to be named later.

On September 27, 2021, it was announced that Graham Norton would be hosting the series. The judges were announced on October 28, 2021, as being Leona Lewis, Michelle Visage, Trixie Mattel and Vanessa Williams.

The cast was announced on November 10, 2021, with a total of fourteen contestants, including RuPaul's Drag Race alumna Jujubee, and The Switch Drag Race Season 2 winner Leona Winter.

== Contestants ==
Names and cities stated are at time of filming.

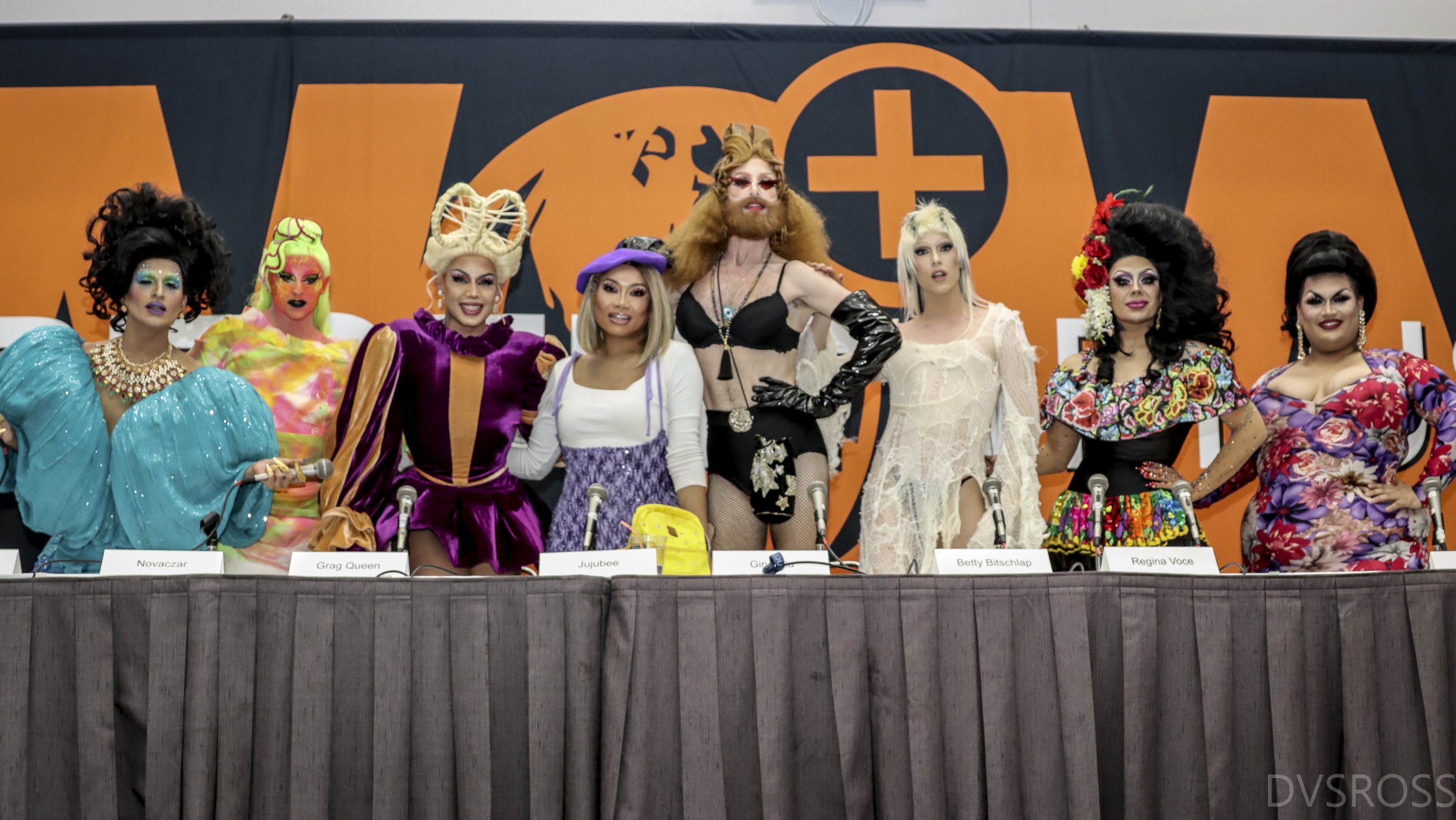
Part of the cast at RuPaul's DragCon LA 2022, from left to right: Rani Ko-He-Nur, Novaczar, Grag Queen, Jujubee, Gingzilla, Betty Bitschlap, Regina Voce, Ada Vox

Contestants of Queen of the Universe
Contestant	Hometown	Outcome
Grag Queen	Canela, Brazil	Winner
Ada Vox	San Antonio, United States	Runner-up
Aria B Cassadine	Atlanta, United States	3rd place
La Voix	London, United Kingdom	4th place (Note: La Voix originally placed tenth before reentering the competition.)
Rani Ko-He-Nur	Mumbai, India	4th place
Leona Winter	Paris, France	6th place
Gingzilla	Sydney, Australia	7th place
Regina Voce	Mexico City, Mexico	7th place
Matante Alex	Montreal, Canada	9th place
Betty Bitschlap	Copenhagen, Denmark	10th place
Chy'enne Valentino	Chicago, United States	10th place
Jujubee	Boston, United States	10th place
Novaczar	New York City, United States	10th place
Woowu	Guangzhou, China	10th place

== Contestants progress ==
Legend:

Grag Queen won Queen of the Universe season 1.
Ada Vox was the runner-up.
ADV indicates that the contestant advanced to the following episode.
BTM (Bottom) indicates that the contestant was up for elimination.
ELIM (Eliminated) indicates that the contestant was eliminated.
Guest indicates that the contestant returned as a guest.

Progress of contestants including placements in each episode
Contestant	Episode					
Contestant	1	2	3	4	5	6
Grag Queen	ADV		ADV	ADV	ADV	Winner
Ada Vox		ADV	ADV	ADV	BTM	Runner-up
Aria B Cassadine		ADV	ADV	ADV	ADV	Eliminated
La Voix		ELIM	ADV	BTM	ELIM	Guest
Rani Ko-He-Nur		ADV	ADV	ADV	ELIM	Guest
Leona Winter	ADV		BTM	ELIM		Guest
Gingzilla	ADV		ADV	ELIM		Guest
Regina Voce		ADV	BTM	ELIM		Guest
Matante Alex		ADV	ELIM			Guest
Jujubee		ELIM				Guest
Betty Bitschlap	ELIM					Guest
Chy'enne Valentino	ELIM					Guest
Novaczar	ELIM					Guest
Woowu	ELIM					Guest

== Performance shows ==
=== Round 1: This Is Me (December 2) ===
Queens were to impress the judges with their W.A.P. - What they were wearing, All-star Attitude and Performances during these two-part premiere episodes. At the end of this round, six contestants were eliminated by the judges.

Performances on the first episode
Queen	Order	Song	Result
Grag Queen	1	"Rehab"	Safe
Betty Bitschlap	2	"Dance Monkey"	Eliminated
Chy'enne Valentino	3	"Wrecking Ball"	Eliminated
Woowu	4	"Material Girl (200 Du)"	Eliminated
Novaczar	5	"I'm Not a Girl, Not Yet a Woman"	Eliminated
Gingzilla	6	"Human"	Safe
Leona Winter	7	"Non, je ne regrette rien"	Safe

Performances on the second episode
Queen	Order	Song	Result
Ada Vox	1	"At Last"	Safe
Regina Voce	2	"Caruso"	Safe
Rani Ko-He-Nur	3	"Piya Tu Ab To Aja", "Laila Main Laila"	Safe
La Voix	4	"Mourir sur scène"	Eliminated
Jujubee	5	"Into You"	Eliminated
Matante Alex	6	"He Taught Me How To Yodel"	Safe
Aria B Cassadine	7	"Rise Like a Phoenix"	Safe

=== Round 2: Turn Back Time (December 9) ===
La Voix was initially eliminated in the previous round but was brought back by the judges. At the end of this round, the in-studio audience saved six Queens, leaving one of the bottom three Queens eliminated by the judges.

Performances on the third episode
Queen	Order	Song	Result
Aria B Cassadine	1	"You Make Me Feel"	Safe
Leona Winter	2	"The Winner Takes It All"	Bottom Three
Regina Voce	3	"Un-Break My Heart"	Bottom Three
Grag Queen	4	"Dream a Little Dream of Me"	Safe
Matante Alex	5	"9 to 5"	Eliminated
Rani Ko-He-Nur	6	"My Heart Will Go On"	Safe
Ada Vox	7	"I Put a Spell on You"	Safe
Gingzilla	8	"Believe"	Safe
La Voix (Note: La Voix was originally eliminated, but was later brought back by the judges.)	9	"Car Wash"	Safe

=== Round 3: Duets (December 16) ===
Queens paired themselves up and wrote an original song based on four categories. At the end of this round, the audience saved two pairs of Queens and eliminated one pair. The remaining pair must perform a "Survival Song" to stay in the competition, where the judges eliminated one more Queen.

Performances on the fourth episode
Queens	Order	Song	Result
Rani Ko-He-Nur & Grag Queen	1	"Damn That Man"	Safe
Gingzilla & Regina Voce	2	"Girl Power"	Eliminated
La Voix & Leona Winter	3	"Friends Forever"	Survival Sing-Off
Ada Vox & Aria B Cassadine	4	"Back Off Bitch"	Safe
Survival Sing-Off details
La Voix	1	"Don't Rain on My Parade"	Saved
Leona Winter	2	"The Edge of Glory"	Eliminated

=== Round 4: Bad Girls (December 23) ===
At the end of the semi-finals round, the audience sends two Queens to the finals, while the judges save one of the remaining Queens.

Performances on the semi-final episode
Queen	Order	Song	Result
Ada Vox	1	"Cuz I Love You"	Bottom Three
Rani Ko-He-Nur	2	"Bad Romance"	Eliminated
Aria B Cassadine	3	"Bad Girls"	Safe
La Voix	4	"Welcome to Burlesque"	Eliminated
Grag Queen	5	"Girls Just Want to Have Fun"	Safe

=== Round 5: Holi-Gay Finale (December 30) ===
The final three Queens perform two songs, and one Queen takes home the top prize of $250,000 and the title of Queen of the Universe.

Performances on the finale episode
Queen	Order	Song	Order	Song	Result
Grag Queen	1	"Jingle Bell Rock"	6	"Rise Up"	Winner
Aria B Cassadine	2	"Rudolph the Red-Nosed Reindeer"	4	"This Is the Moment"	Third Place
Ada Vox	3	"Pure Imagination"	5	"Open Arms"	Runner-Up

== Episodes ==
No. overall	No. in season	Title	Original release date	Prod. code
1	1	"This Is Me"	December 2, 2021	101
2	2	"This Is Me"	December 2, 2021	102
3	3	"Turn Back Time"	December 9, 2021	103
4	4	"Duets"	December 16, 2021	104
5	5	"Bad Girls"	December 23, 2021	105
6	6	"Holi-Gay Finale"	December 30, 2021	106
