= Queen of the Universe (TV series) =

American television series

- Directed by: Julian Smith
- Presented by: Graham Norton
- Judges: Leona Lewis; Trixie Mattel; Michelle Visage; Vanessa Williams; Mel B
- Opening theme: "Queen of the Universe" theme
- Country of origin: United States
- Original language: English
- No. of seasons: 2
- No. of episodes: 14

Production
- Executive producers: RuPaul Charles; Marc Bassett
- Producer: Carl Webber
- Running time: 45 minutes
- Production company: World of Wonder

Original release
- Network: Paramount+
- Release: December 2, 2021 – June 22, 2023

Queen of the Universe is a drag queen singing competition television series produced by World of Wonder. The series was hosted by Graham Norton with four pop music judges. The contestants competed for a cash prize of $250,000. The series premiered on Paramount+ on December 2, 2021. In February 2022, the series was renewed for a second season. On June 23, 2023, the series was canceled after two seasons, and was subsequently removed from Paramount+ on June 30, 2023. WOW Presents Plus agreed to make the show available for streaming on its platform.

The winner of the first season was Grag Queen from Brazil, with Ada Vox from the U.S. finishing as the runner-up.

The winner of the second season was Taiga Brava from Mexico, with Trevor Ashley from Australia finishing as the runner-up.

== Production ==
On February 24, 2021, Paramount Global and Paramount+ announced the international drag-singing competition Queen of the Universe from World of Wonder, the producers behind RuPaul’s Drag Race, with cast members to be named later.

=== Judges ===
On September 27, 2021, it was announced that Graham Norton would be hosting the series. The judges were announced on October 28, 2021, as being Leona Lewis, Michelle Visage, Trixie Mattel and Vanessa Williams. The contestants for the first season were revealed on November 10, 2021. On February 15, 2022, it was announced that the series was renewed for a second season. In June 2022, it was announced that Mel B would replace Lewis as a judge in season 2 while Norton, Visage, Mattel and Williams would return.

Judges on Queen of the Universe
Judge	Series	
Judge	1	2
Leona Lewis	Main	
Trixie Mattel	Main	Main
Michelle Visage	Main	Main
Vanessa Williams	Main	Main
Mel B		Main

== Series overview ==
Season	Contestants	Winner	Runner-up	Prize Money	Episodes	Originally released	
Season	Contestants	Winner	Runner-up	Prize Money	Episodes	First released	Last released
1	14	Grag Queen	Ada Vox	$250,000	6	December 2, 2021	December 30, 2021
2	10	Taiga Brava	Trevor Ashley	$250,000	8	June 2, 2023	June 22, 2023

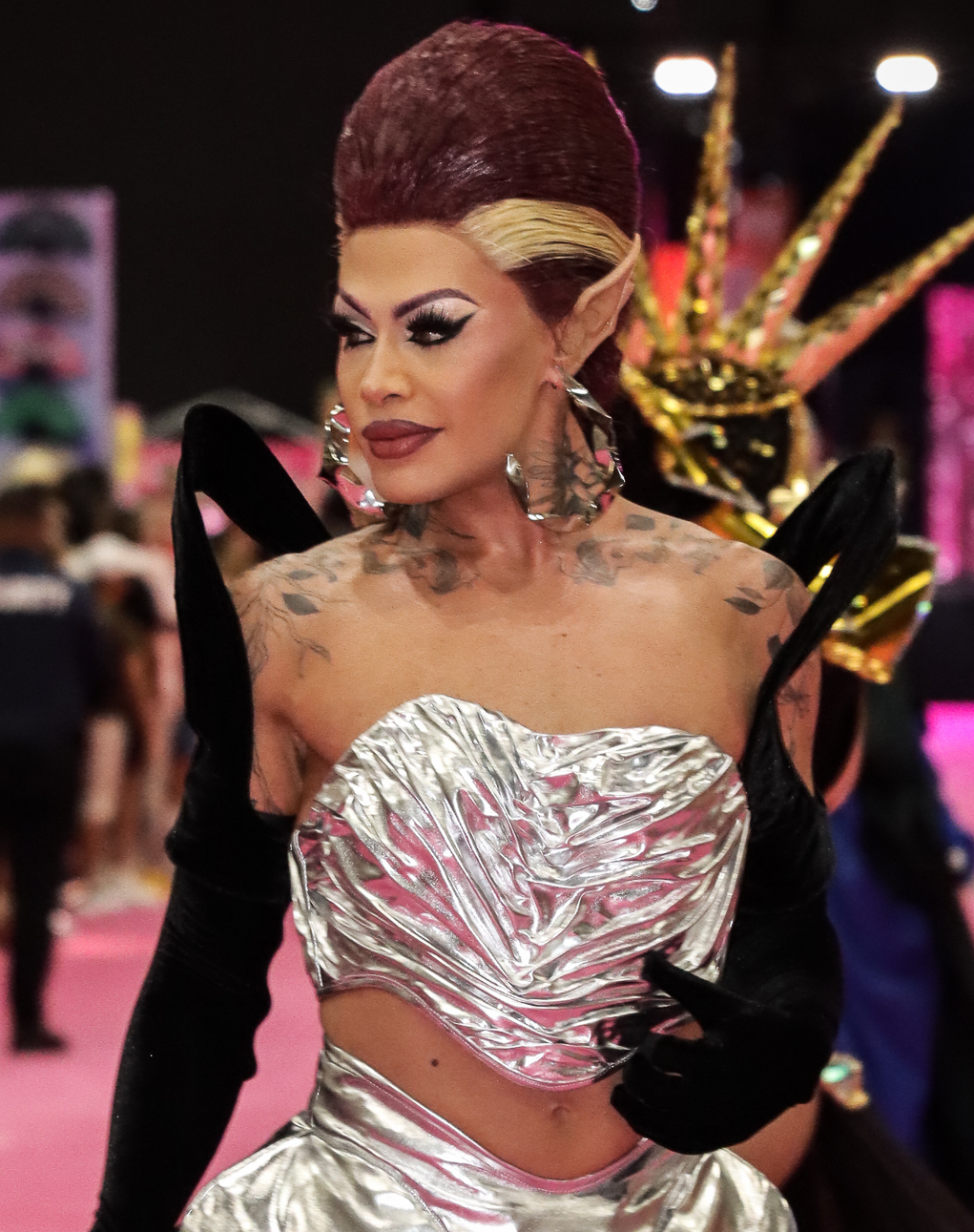
Season 1 winner
Grag Queen

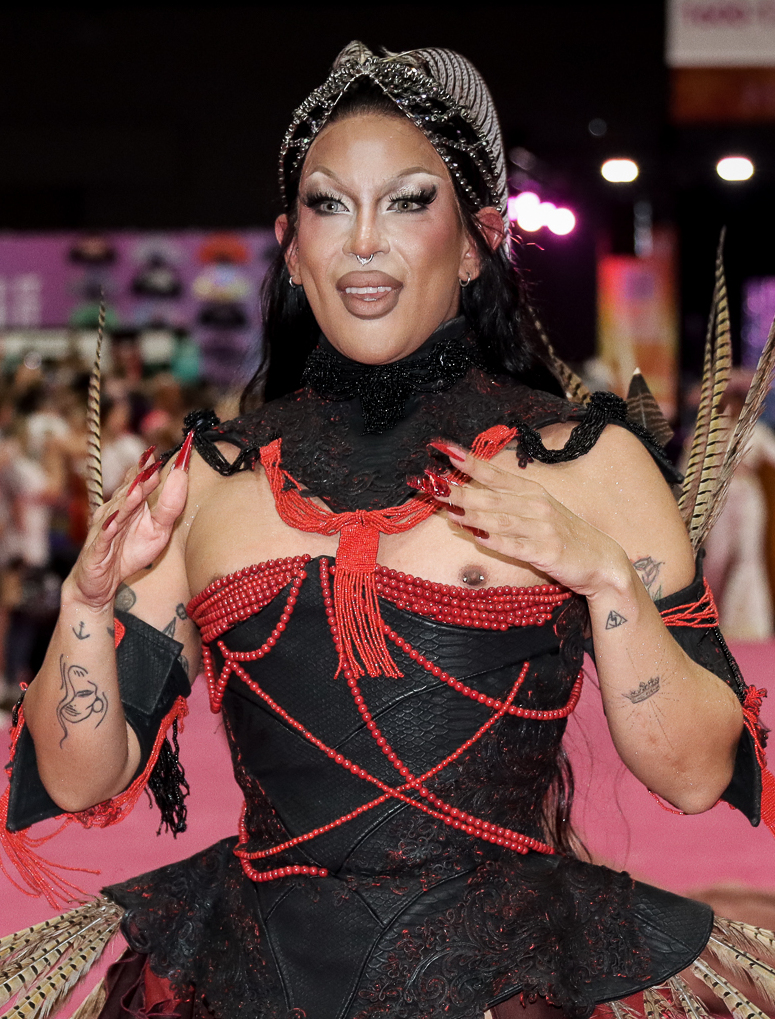
Season 2 winner
Taiga Brava

=== Season 1 (2021) ===
The first season of Queen of the Universe premiered on December 2, 2021, on Paramount+. The season ran for six episodes and concluded on December 30, 2021. Ada Vox was the runner-up, and Grag Queen was the winner of the first season.

No. overall	No. in season	Title	Original release date	Prod. code
1	1	"This Is Me"	December 2, 2021	101
2	2	"This Is Me"	December 2, 2021	102
3	3	"Turn Back Time"	December 9, 2021	103
4	4	"Duets"	December 16, 2021	104
5	5	"Bad Girls"	December 23, 2021	105
6	6	"Holi-Gay Finale"	December 30, 2021	106

=== Season 2 (2023) ===
The second season of Queen of the Universe premiered on June 2, 2023, on Paramount+.

No. overall	No. in season	Title	Original release date	Prod. code
7	1	"Bigger Hits, Glossier Lips and Massive T**s"	June 2, 2023	201
8	2	"A Spicy Twist"	June 2, 2023	202
9	3	"Double Trouble"	June 8, 2023	203
10	4	"Dragging up the Past"	June 16, 2023	204
11	5	"Who's Ready for a Dance Off?"	June 22, 2023	205
12	6	"Exposed!"	June 22, 2023	206
13	7	"Battle of the Divas"	June 22, 2023	207
14	8	"The Winner Is..."	June 22, 2023	208

== Awards and nominations ==
Award	Year	Category	Recipient(s) and nominee(s)	Result	Ref.
Queerty Awards	2022	Reality/Docuseries	Queen of the Universe	Nominated	
MTV Movie & TV Awards	2022	Best Unscripted Series	Queen of the Universe	Nominated	

== See also ==
- List of Paramount+ original programming
- List of reality television programs with LGBT cast members
