= Transgender representation in the Drag Race franchise =

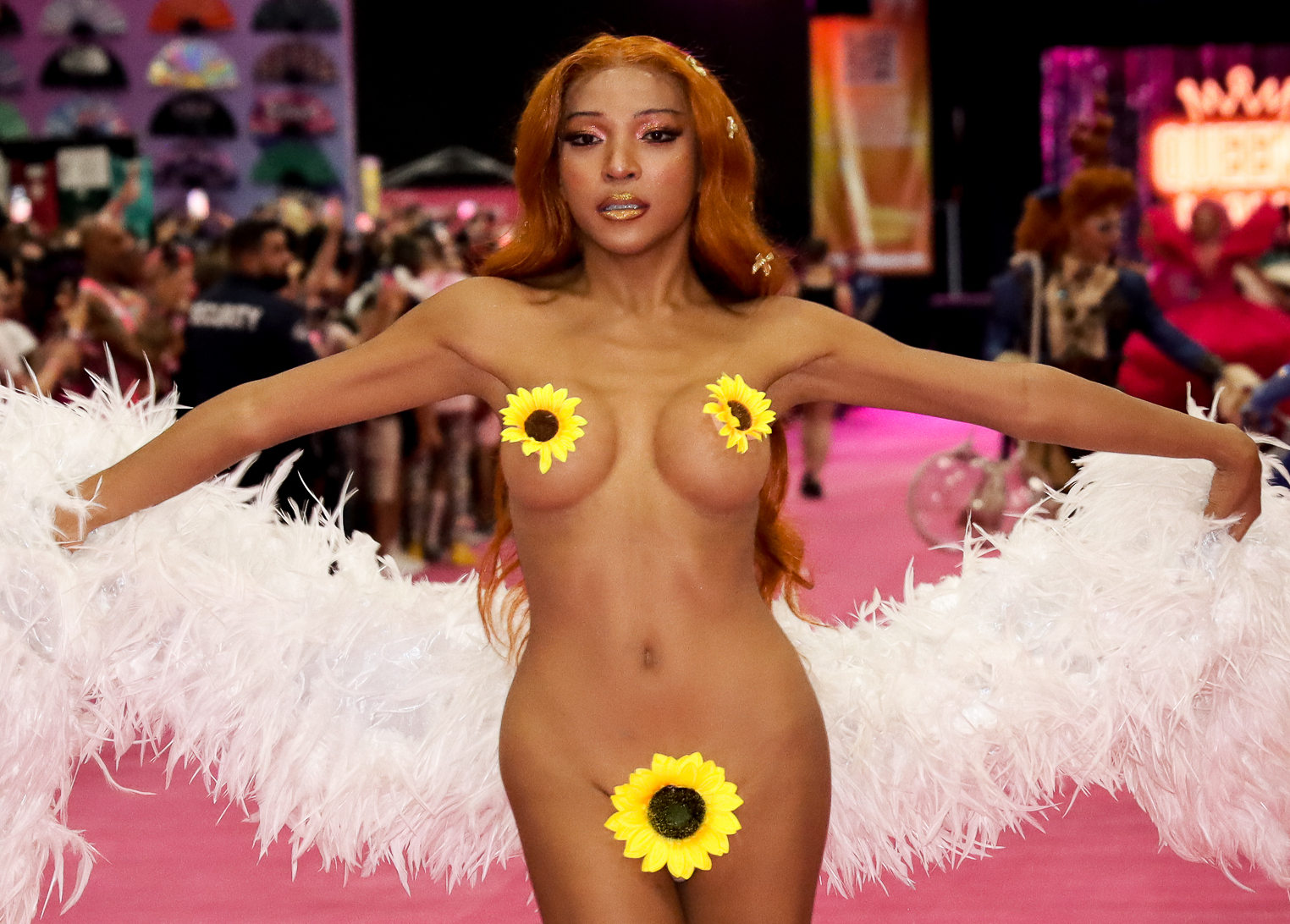
Angele Anang (pictured in 2024) became the first transgender contestant to win a season within the Drag Race franchise when she competed on the second season (2019) of Drag Race Thailand.

Many transgender people have been contestants or judges in the Drag Race franchise. The franchise originated with RuPaul's Drag Race, which premiered in the United States in 2009. Since then, several adaptations and spin-offs have been created internationally. In 2019, The Guardian said the U.S. series "is known for its camp theatrics, but it has become a flashpoint for discussions of race and representation in the queer community and trans-inclusivity." RuPaul's stance on trans inclusion has evolved over time.

According to Them, "Longtime RuPaul's Drag Race fans know that the show's history of trans representation has been something of a mixed bag. The program, revolutionary in many ways for the LGBTQ+ community, has also included several segments that have made jokes at trans people's expense, including the infamous original catchphrase for Ru's video mail and a season 6 challenge that asked contestants to guess whether a close-up picture was of a trans or cis woman."

In 2023, Bernardo Sim of Out magazine wrote, "Over the years, drag performers who identified as trans revolutionized the way that mainstream audiences perceived them in the RuPaul's Drag Race franchise."

== RuPaul's Drag Race and All Stars ==
RuPaul, who hosts the American television series RuPaul's Drag Race and its spin-off RuPaul's Drag Race All Stars, said in March 2018 that he would "probably not" allow trans women to compete. He backtracked and apologized for his comments. Contestants Monica Beverly Hillz, Peppermint, Sasha Velour, and Willam were among contestants who criticized RuPaul's comments. In 2021, while promoting the thirteenth season, RuPaul told Stephen Colbert:

I walked into this thing with an idea of what drag is and the kids have a different idea. They keep changing it. This season we have a trans man who is on our show who is competing with the other drag queens and this man is fantastic. Fantastic! So, I keep moving with what the kids are doing.

Trans actress Ts Madison is a regular judge on Drag Race. Hunter Schafer was a guest judge on the seventeenth season. Laith Ashley is the first trans member of the Pit Crew.

=== Contestants ===
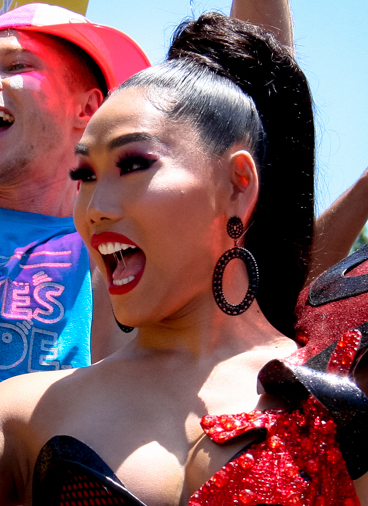
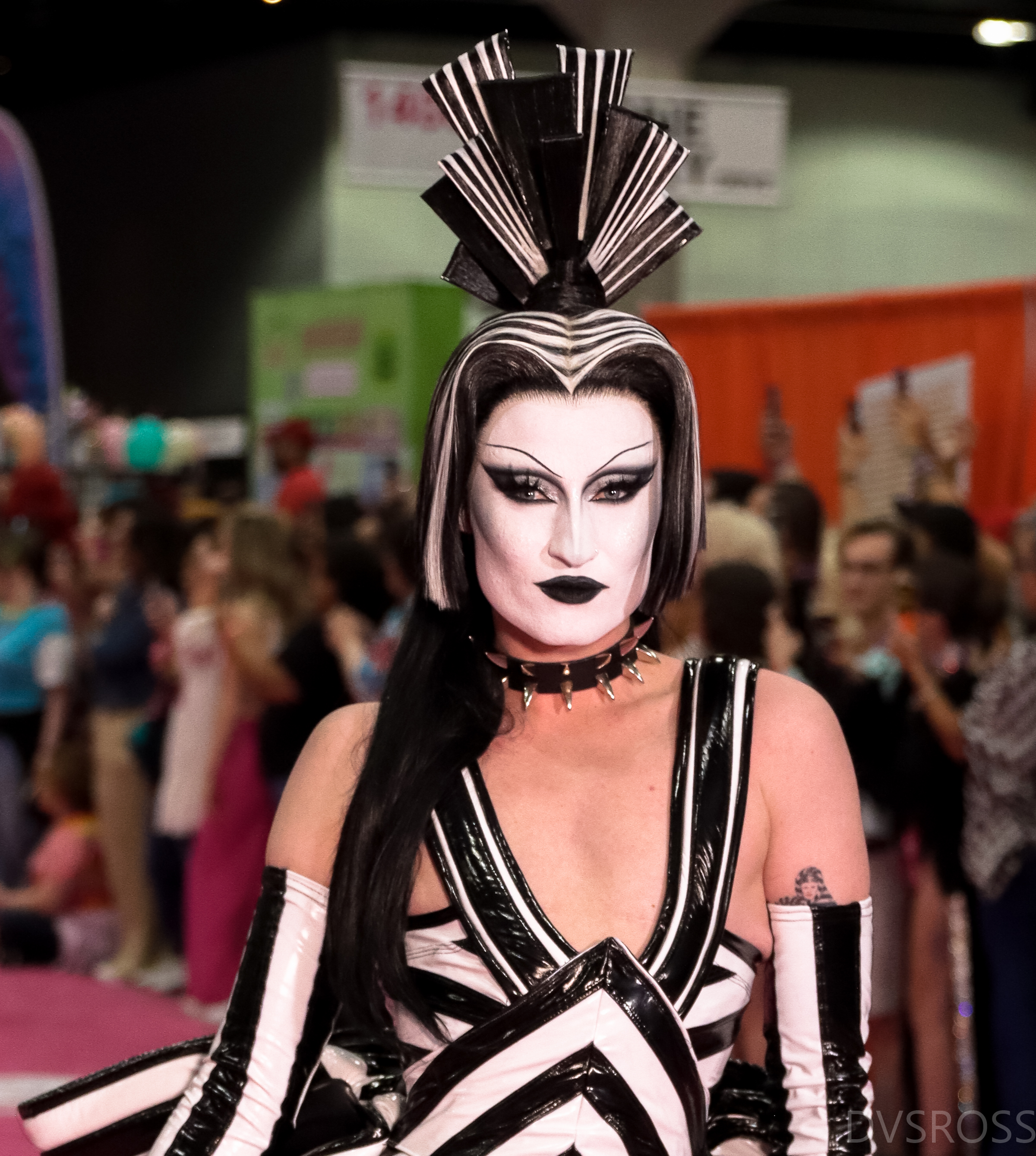
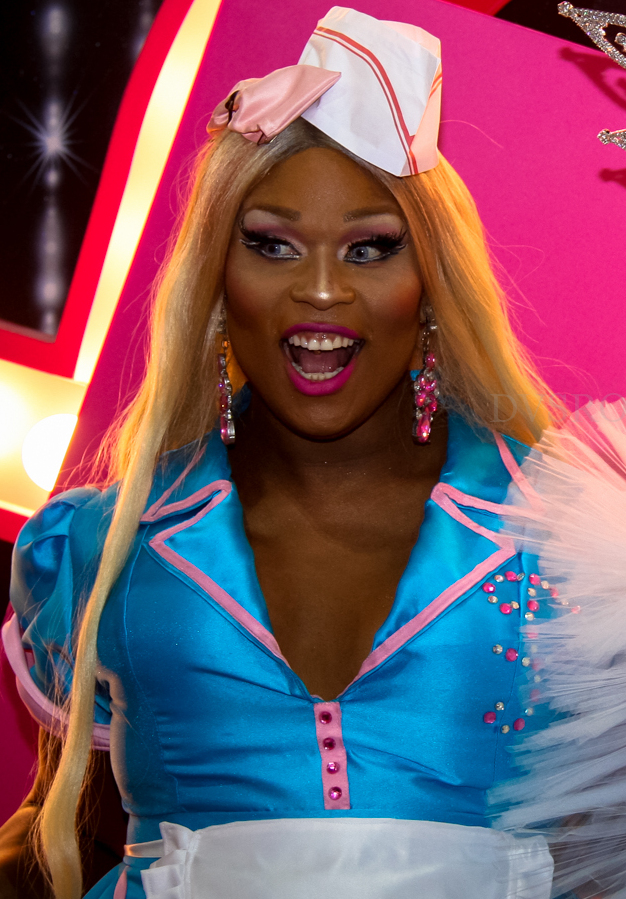
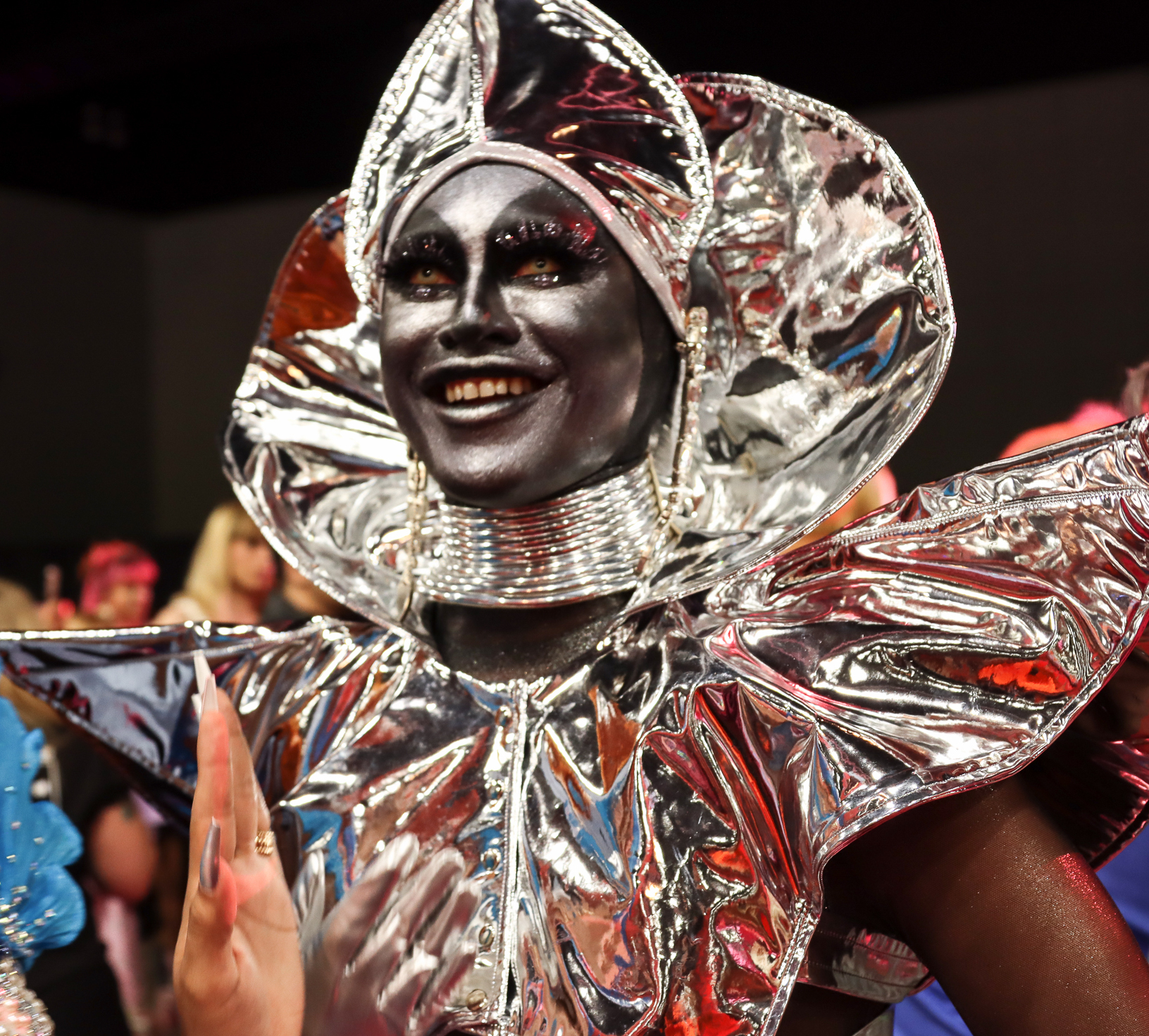
Trans contestants Gia Gunn (top left), Gottmik (top right), Peppermint (bottom left), and Sasha Colby (bottom right). Gia Gunn was the first contestant to compete after transitioning. Gottmik is the first trans man to compete in any franchise. Peppermint became the first contestant to enter the competition openly trans. Sasha Colby became the show's first transgender winner.

The following transgender contestants have competed on Drag Race: Aja, Adore Delano, Amanda Tori Meating, Amethyst, Bosco, Carmen Carrera, Dax ExclamationPoint, Detox, Eureka, Farrah Moan, Gia Gunn, Gigi Goode, Gottmik, Honey Mahogany, Hormona Lisa, Jade Jolie, Jasmine Kennedie, Jiggly Caliente, Jinkx Monsoon, Kelly Mantle, Kenya Michaels, Kerri Colby, Kornbread Jeté, Kylie Sonique Love, Laganja Estranja, Lashauwn Beyond, Lexi Love, Madame LaQueer, Monica Beverly Hillz, Morphine Love Dion, Peppermint, Sasha Colby, Stacy Layne Matthews, Trinity K. Bonet, Trinity the Tuck, Valentina, and Willow Pill.

Gia Gunn was the first contestant to compete after transitioning. She has criticized how trans people have been represented on the show. She has also been criticized for some of her own comments about trans representation on the series. Kylie Sonique Love came out during the second season's reunion episode, making her "the reality show's first trans competitor — and the first person to come out as transgender on any reality-TV show", according to Vulture. She later returned to compete in All Stars and became the first transgender winner of the series in Season 6. Honey Mahogany later became head of San Franicsco's Trans Initiatives Office.

Monica Beverly Hillz was the first contestant to come out on the main stage while filming Drag Race (2013). On the ninth season (2017), Peppermint became the first contestant to enter the completion openly trans. On the thirteenth season (2021), Gottmik became the first openly trans man to compete; one of Gottmik's looks on the ninth season of All Stars acknowledged having chest reconstruction.

Five trans contestants competed on the fourteenth season (2022): Bosco, Jasmine Kennedie, Kerri Colby, Kornbread Jeté, and Willow Pill. Queerty said of the season's premiere: "not only is this is the first reality TV show with two openly trans women in the cast, but it is also the first Drag Race episode where trans women dominated the episode, by winning both the Mini Challenge and the Maxi Challenge". The group of contestants became known as the "Trantastic 5". On the show, Kerri Colby wore an outfit inspired by the transgender flag. After Drag Race, some of her comments about trans children were criticized by Bosco. Jasmine Kennedie came out during an episode of the companion series RuPaul's Drag Race: Untucked.

Sasha Colby competed on the fifteenth season (2023). She became the first trans contestant to win a season of the U.S. series. Trans contestant Amanda Tori Meeting competed on the sixteenth season (2024) and Hormona Lisa and Lexi Love competed on the seventeenth season (2025).

The sixth season (2021) of All Stars marked the first time two trans contestants competed. On All Stars, A'keria C. Davenport discussed detransitioning.

In 2022, Drag Race reunited seven trans former contestants for a photograph commemorating LGBTQ History Month. Various contestants from the series spoke out against anti-trans legislation at a 2023 event celebrating the 200th episode; the video was shared on social media by GLAAD. Judges from the show have also defended the trans community.

== Canada's Drag Race and spin-offs ==
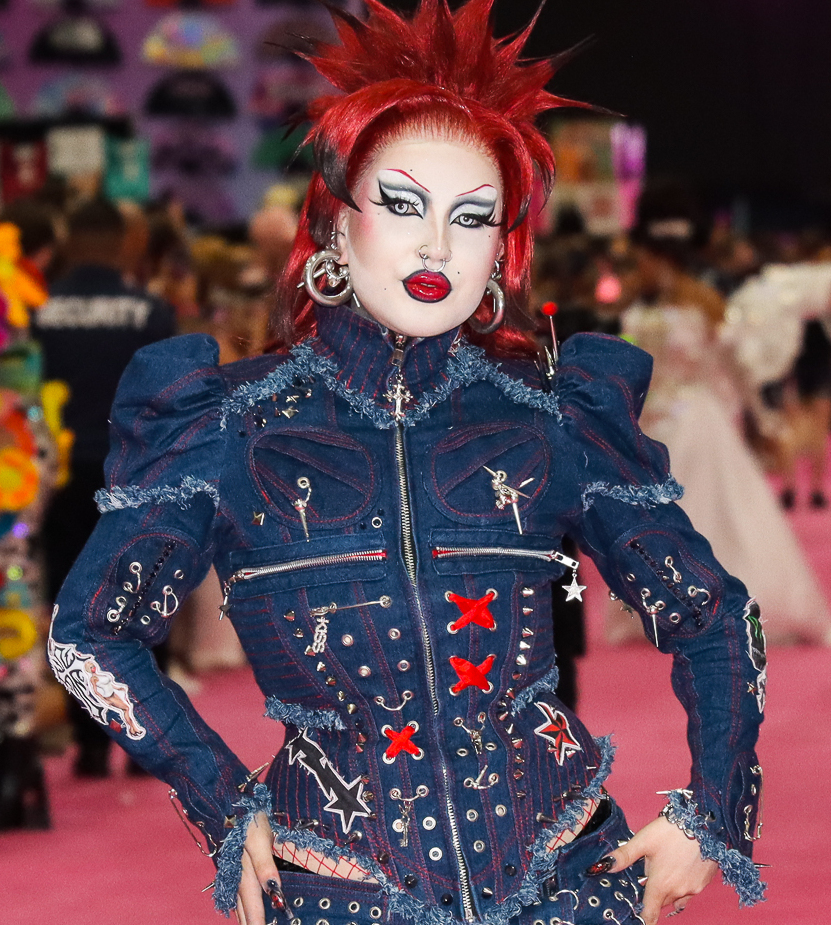
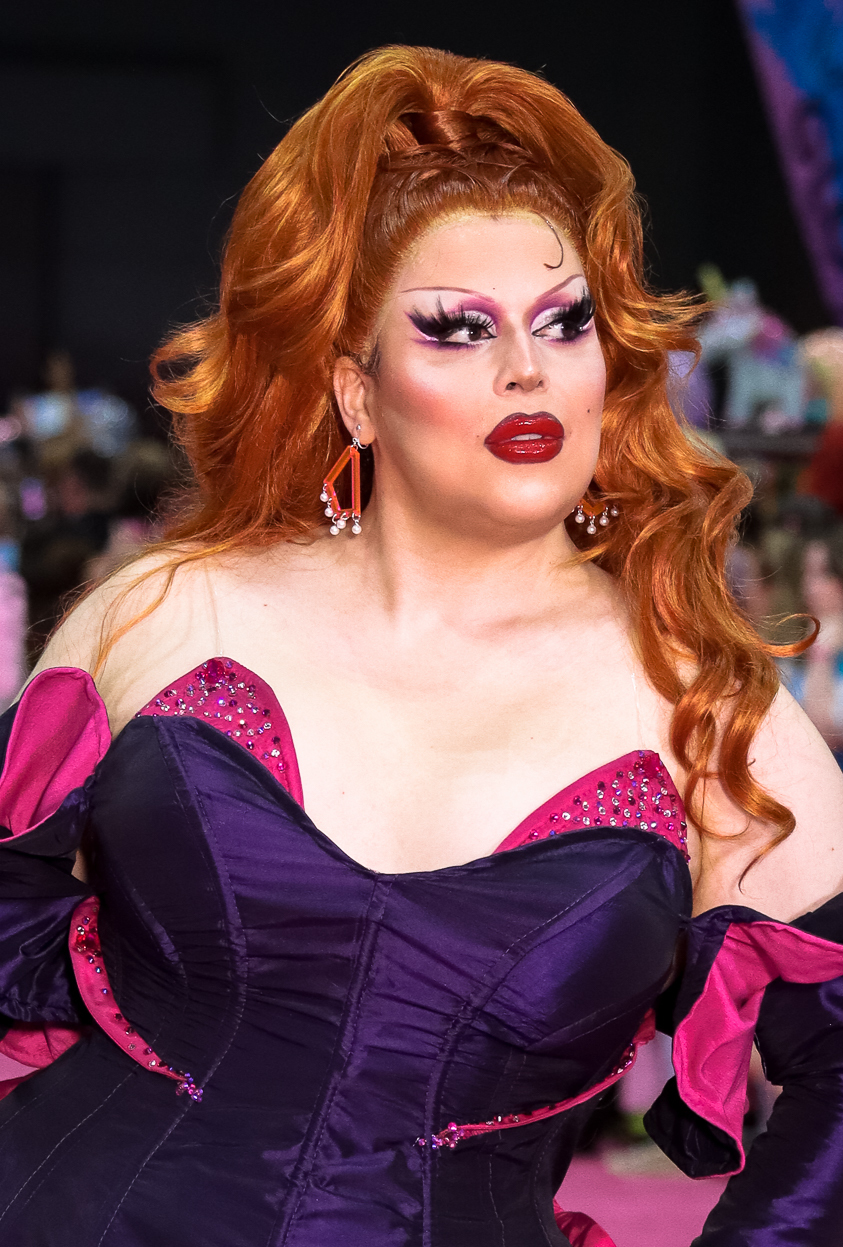
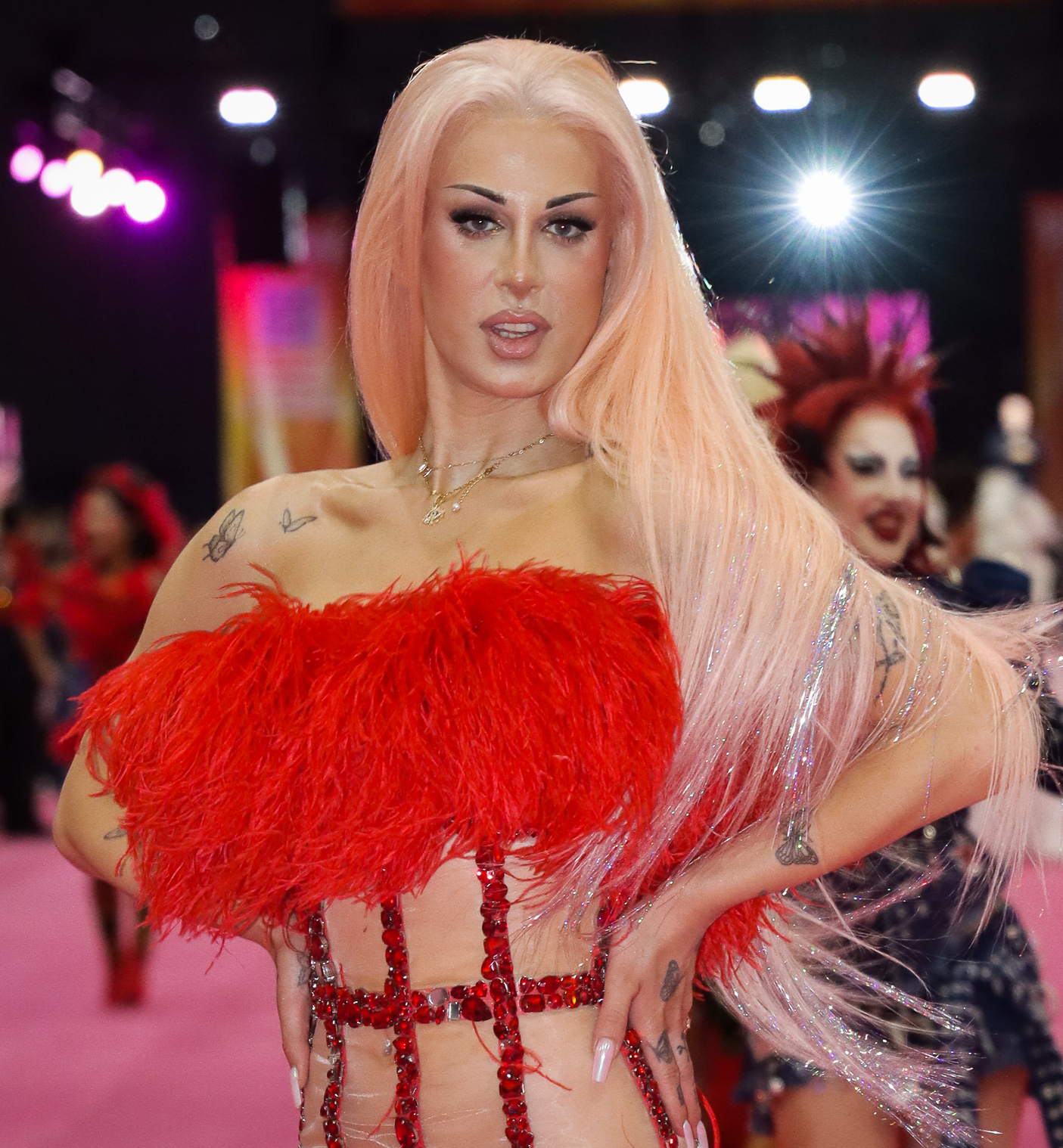
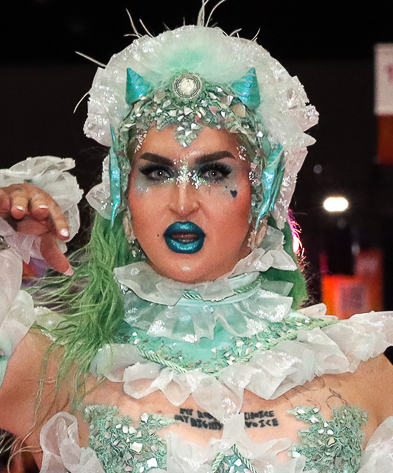
Trans contestants Denim (top left), Eve 6000 (top right), The Girlfriend Experience (bottom left), and Ilona Verley (bottom right) competed on Canada's Drag Race.

On the first season (2020) of the Canadian adaptation of the series, Ilona Verley became the first Indigenous and two-spirit contestant. Ilona Verley claimed they were asked not address their identity as production was "saving that storyline for the American franchise". They identified as non-binary while filming. After the second season (2021) aired, contestant Eve 6000 came out as a trans woman in 2024 and has retired from drag.

On the third season (2022), Kimmy Couture became the first openly trans woman to compete on the show. Trans contestants Denim and The Girlfriend Experience competed on the fourth season (2023–2024). Denim became the second trans man to compete in any franchise. On August 25, 2025, Aimee Yonce Shennel publicly came out as a transgender woman, having come out 6 months prior. Trans contestants Jaylene Tyme, Makayla Couture, and Sanjina DaBish Queen competed on the fifth season (2024–2025). Contestant Tara Nova additionally came out as a trans woman in 2026. Trans contestant Eboni La'Belle competed on the sixth season (2025–2026).

=== Canada vs. the World and All Stars ===
Eureka! from the tenth season of the American version and sixth season of RuPaul's Drag Race: All Stars competed in the second season of Canada's Drag Race: Canada vs. the World.

Makayla Couture from the fifth season competed in the first season of Canada's Drag Race All Stars.

== Drag Race Down Under ==
Trans contestant Etcetera Etcetera competed on the first season (2021) of Drag Race Down Under (originally known as RuPaul's Drag Race Down Under), an adaptation of the show for Australia and New Zealand.

== Drag Race España and All Stars ==
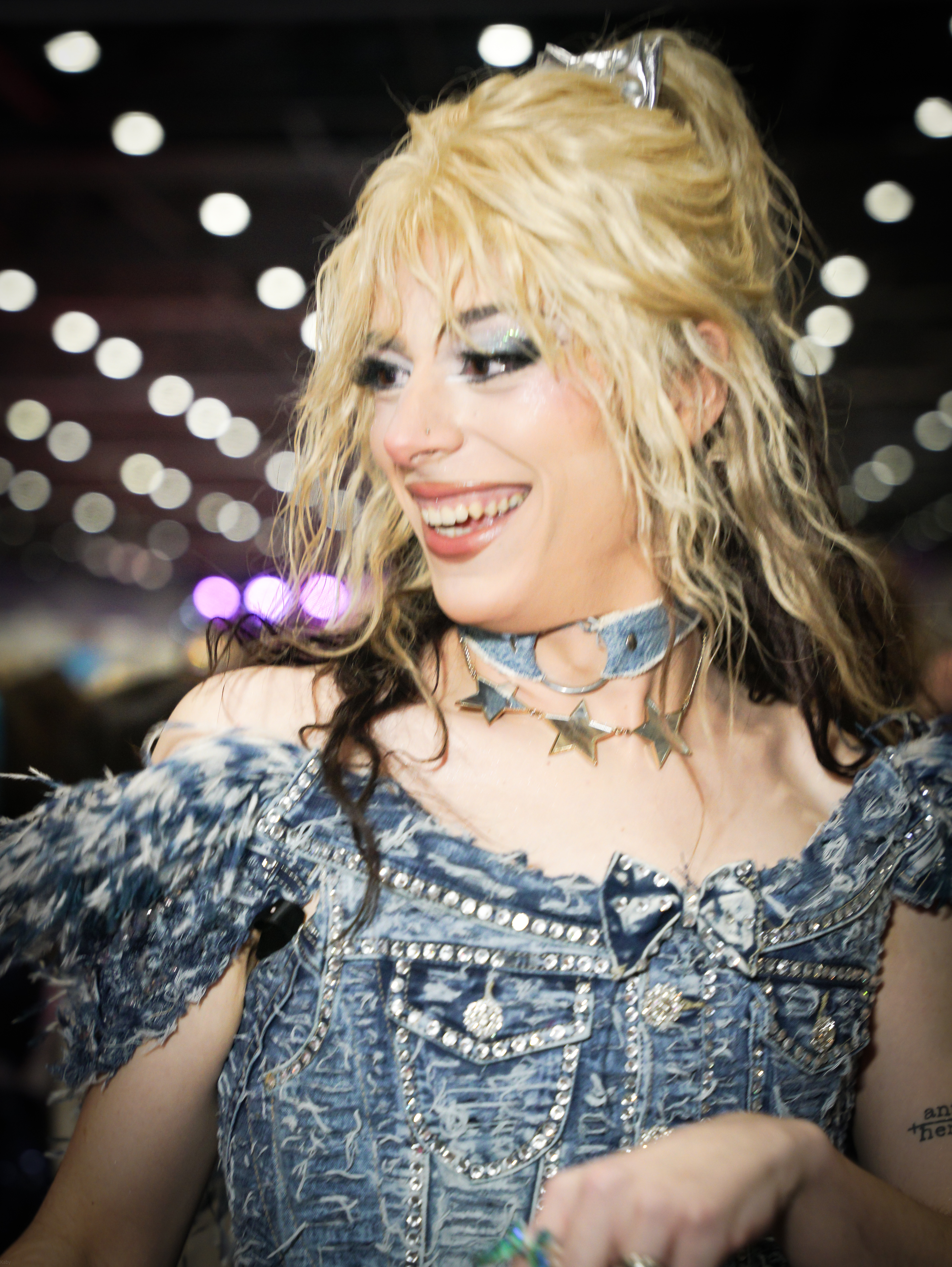
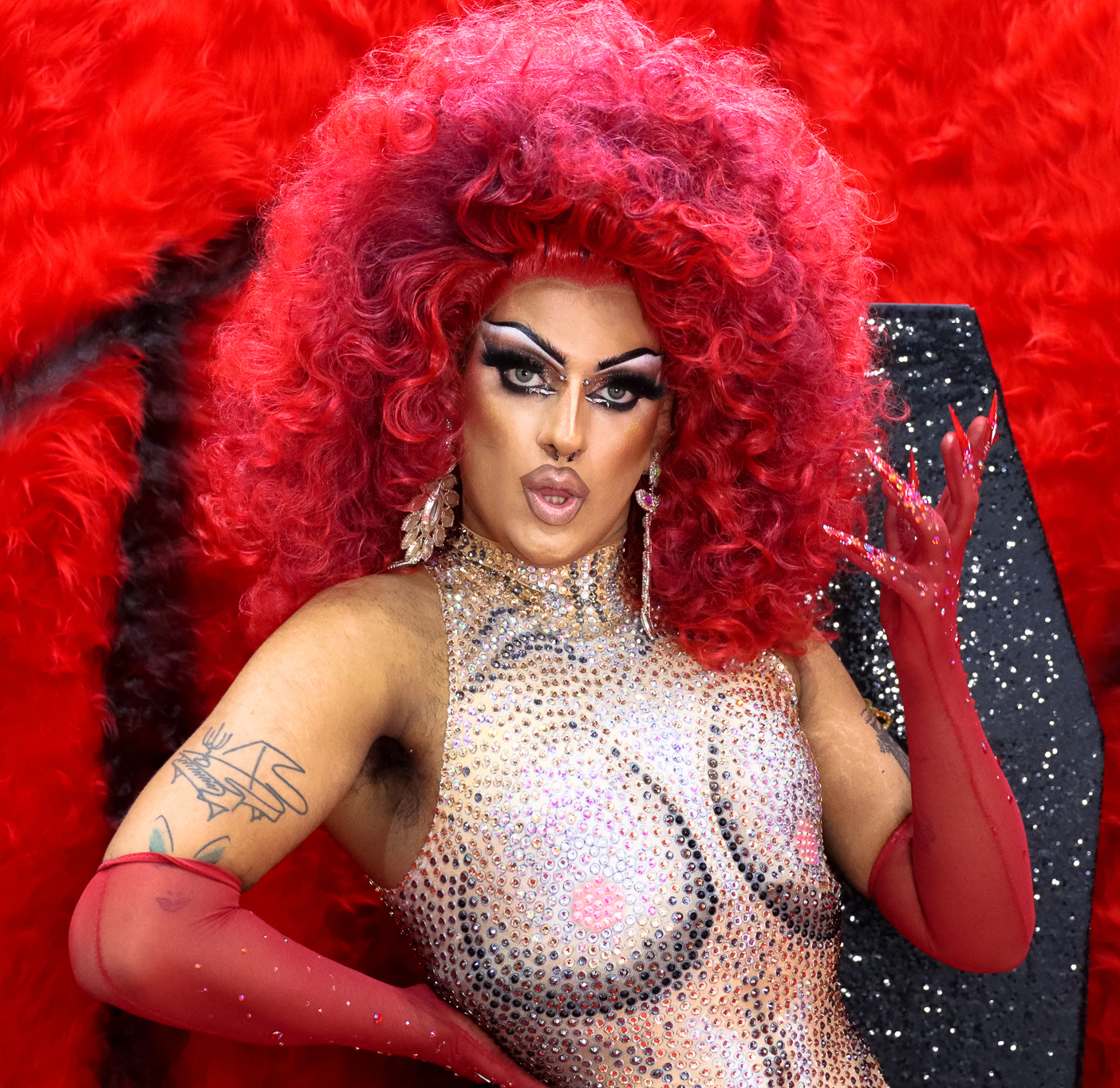
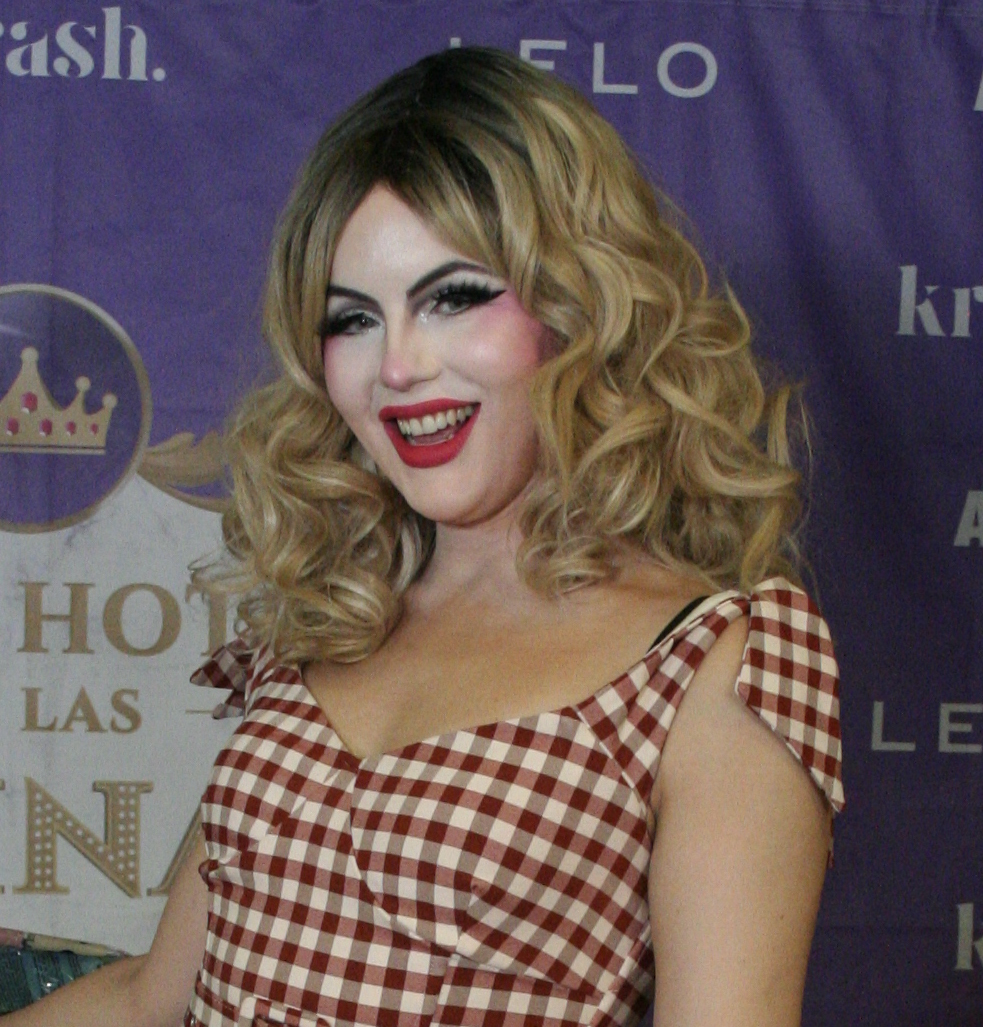
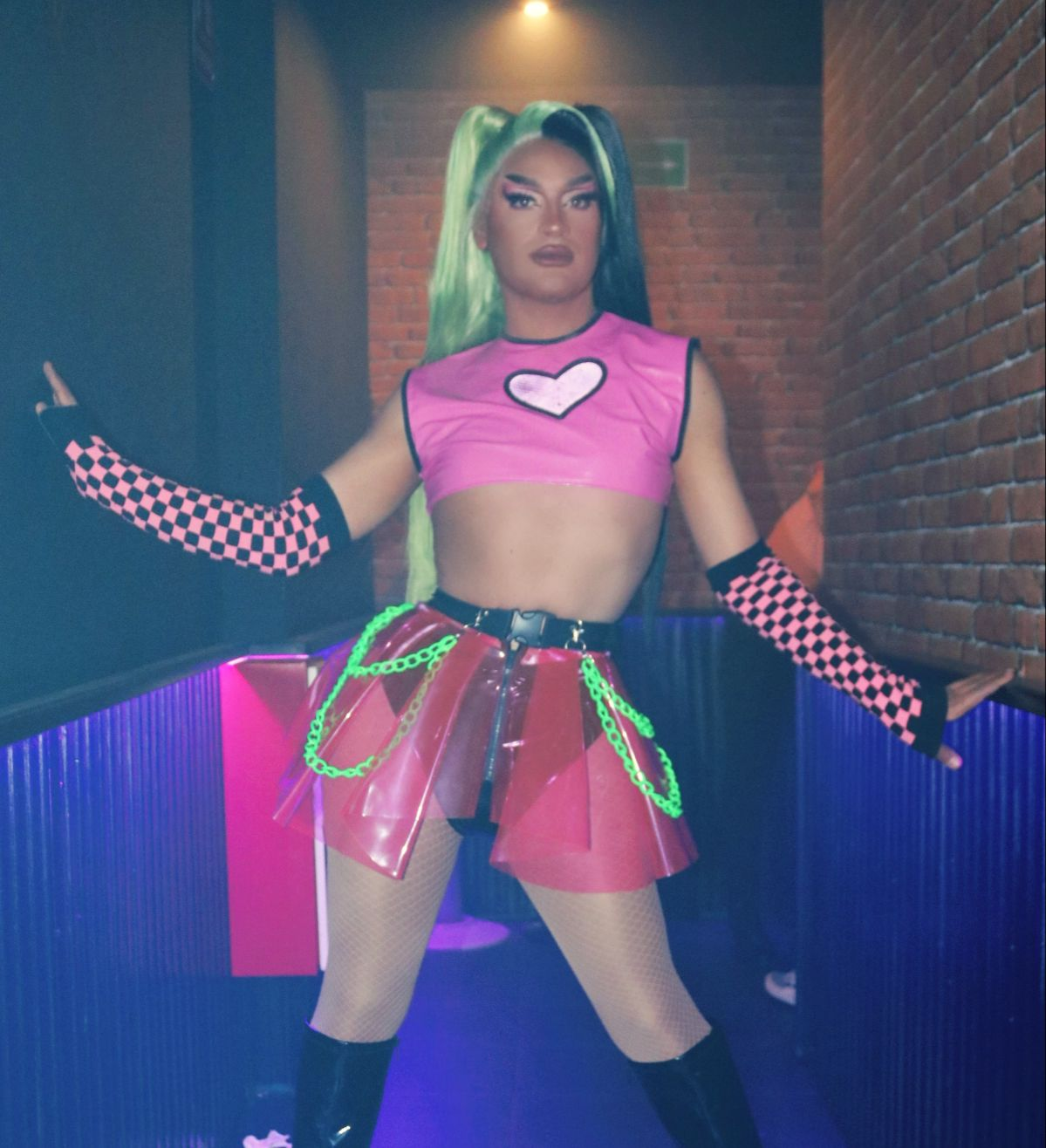
Trans contestants Arantxa Castilla-La Mancha (top left), Jota Carajota (top right), Juriji der Klee (bottom left), and The Macarena (bottom right) competed on Drag Race España.

Trans contestants Arantxa Castilla-La Mancha and Inti competed on the first season (2021) of the Spanish adaptation of the series. Jota Carajota, Juriji der Klee and Marina competed on the second season (2022). The Macarena competed on the first and third (2023) seasons. La Niña Delantro competed on the fourth season (2024). Nix competed on the fifth season (2025).

The second season contestant Juriji der Klee competed on the first season of the Spanish spin-off of the American version of the show.

== Drag Race France and All Stars ==
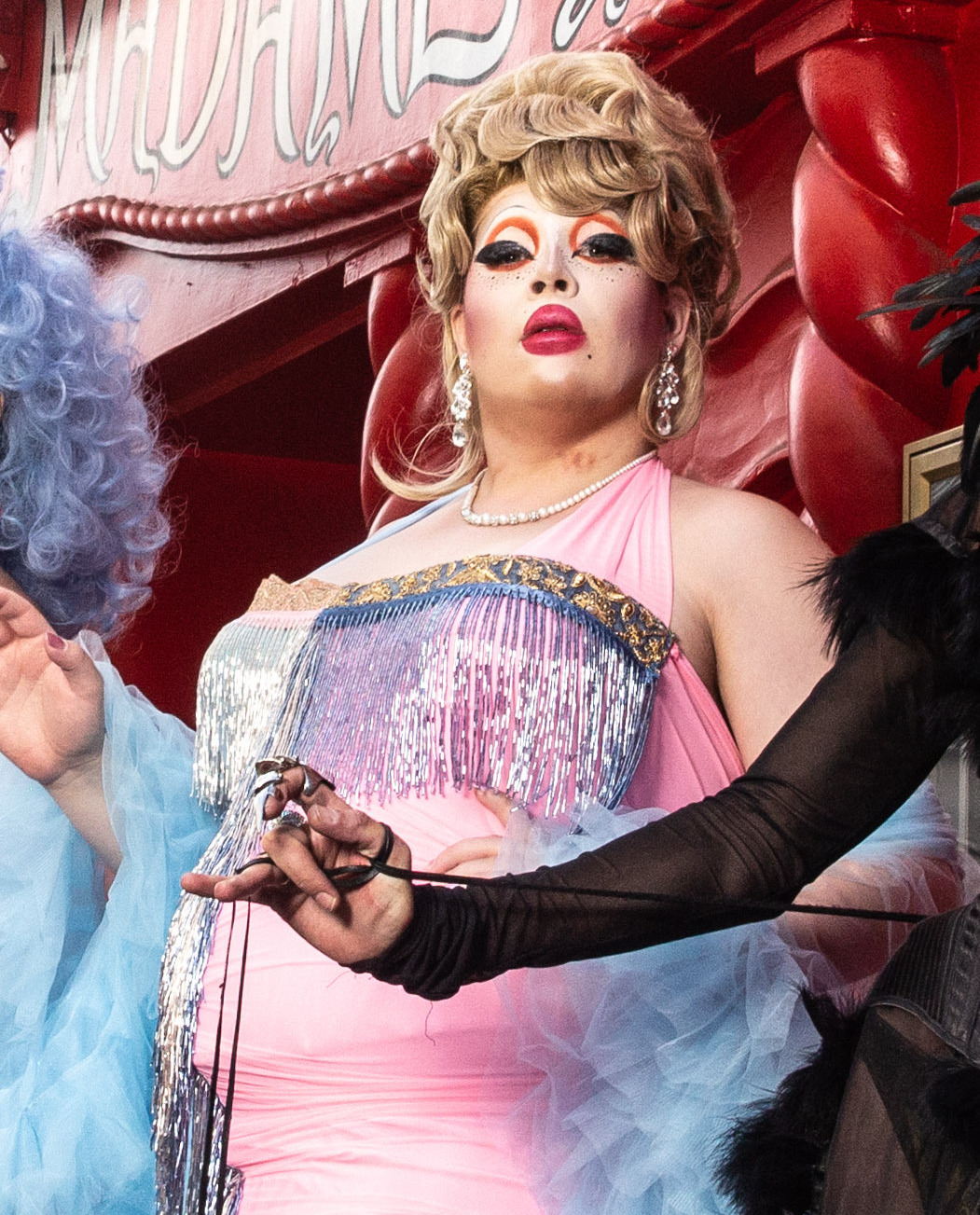
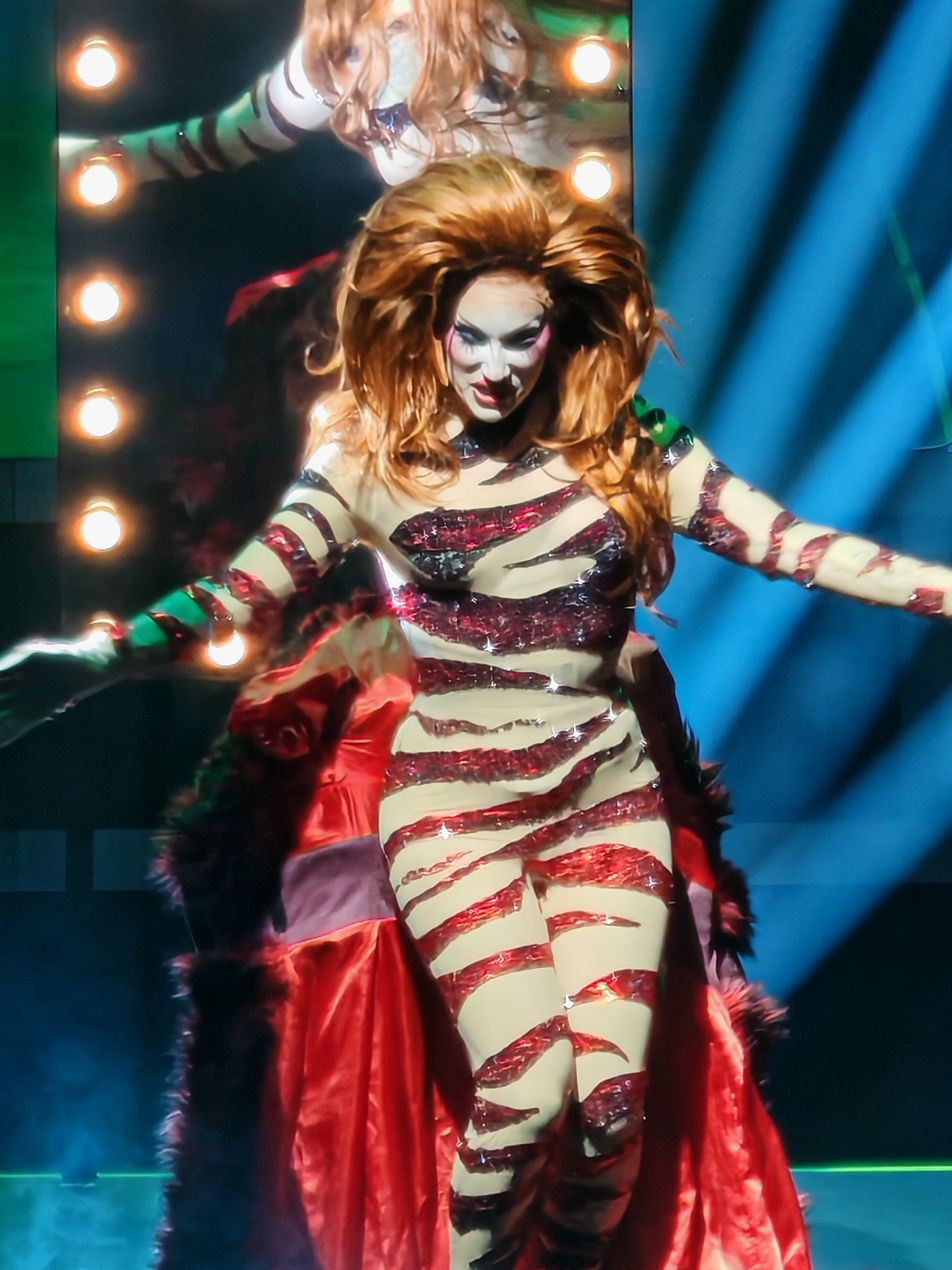
La Briochée (left) and Moon (right) competed on Drag Race France.

La Briochée competed on the first season (2022) of the French adaptation of the series. Moon and Kitty Space competed on the second season (2023). Magnetica competed on the third season (2024).

Moon from the second season and Magnetica from the third season are contestants on the first season of the French version of All Stars.

== Drag Race Holland ==
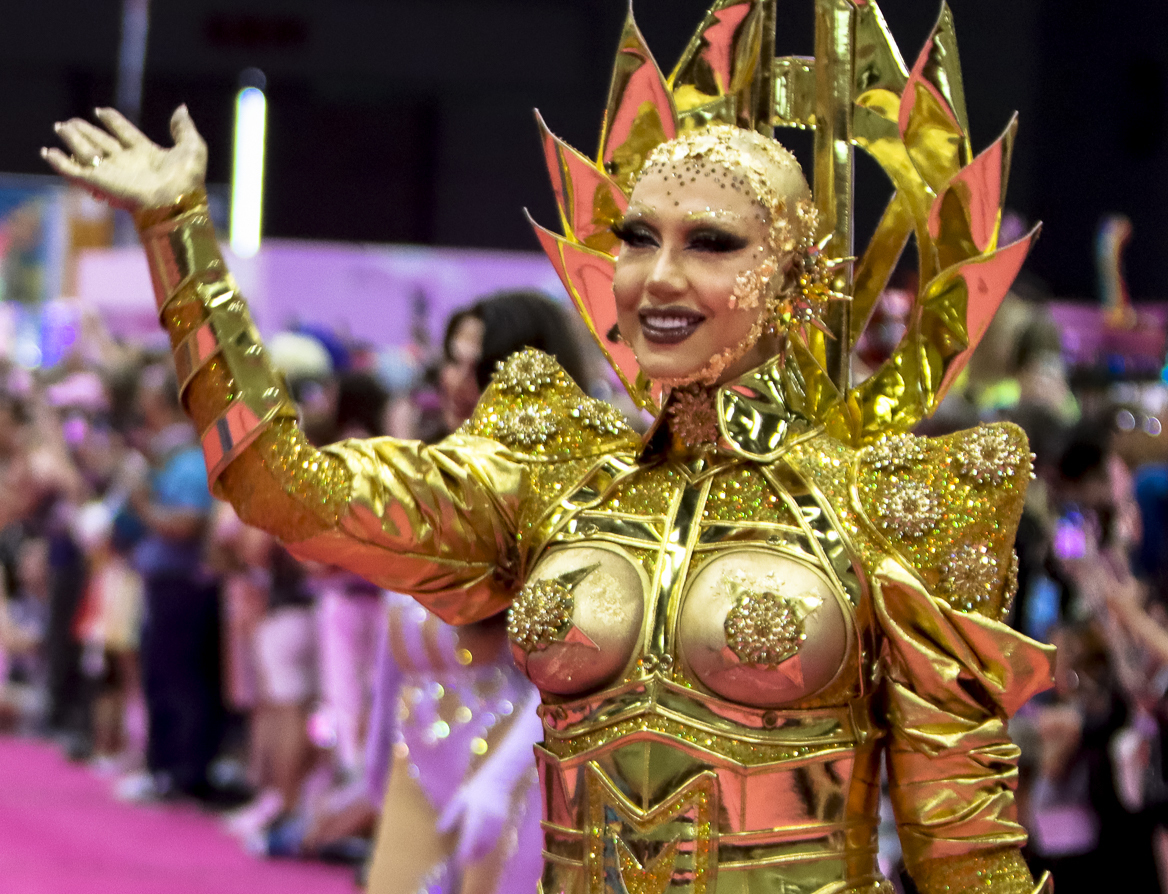
Vanessa Van Cartier (pictured in 2022) is the first transgender winner of Drag Race Holland and the third of any franchise.

Trans contestants Ma'Ma Queen and Vanessa Van Cartier competed on the Dutch adaptation of the series. The latter became the first trans winner of the series and the third of any franchise.

== Drag Race Italia ==
Melissa Bianchini and Lightning Aurora competed on the third season (2023) of the Italian adaptation of the series.

== Drag Race Belgique ==
Trans contestant Valenciaga competed on the first season (2023) of the Belgian adaptation of the series.

== Drag Race México ==
Trans contestant Margaret Y Ya competed on the first season (2023) of the Mexican adaptation of the series.

== Drag Race Brazil ==
Trans contestant Mellody Queen is competing on the second season (2025) of the Brazilian adaptation of the series just like the Travesti contestant Chanel.

== Drag Race Philippines and Slaysian Royale ==
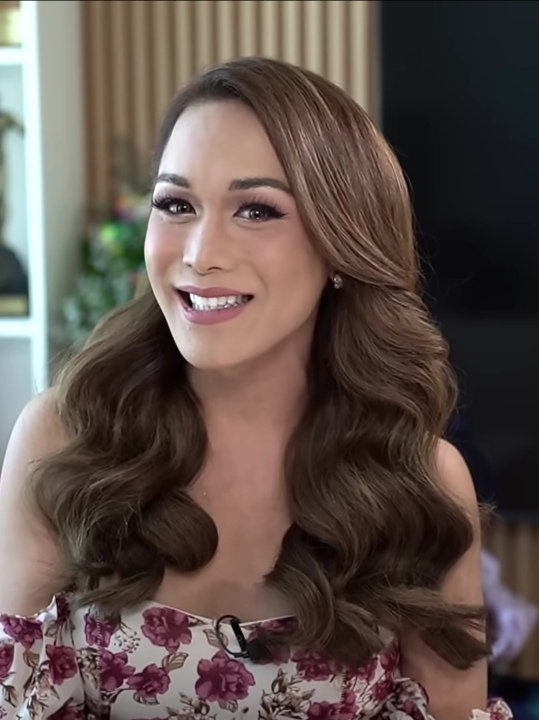
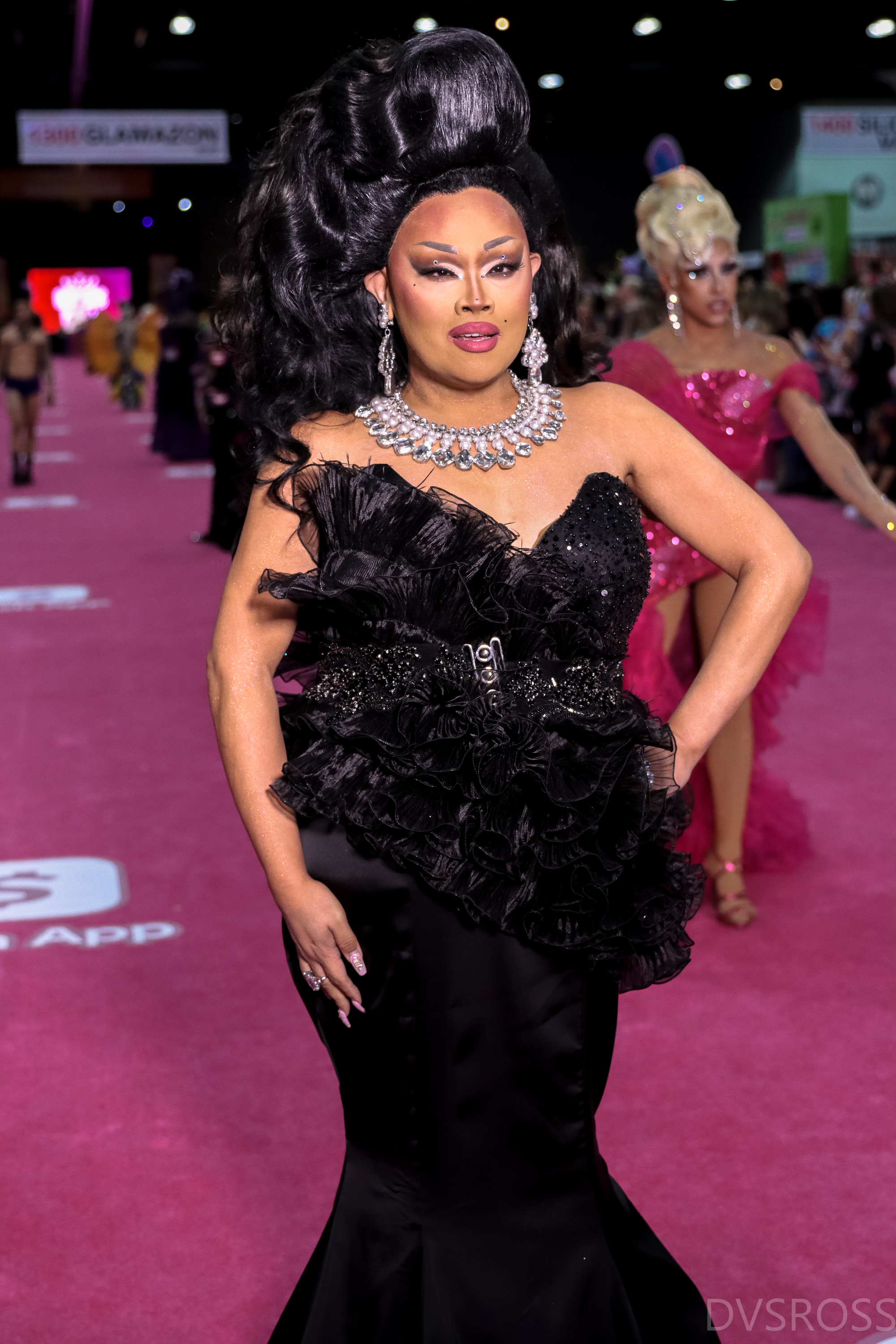
Trans women KaladKaren (left) and Jiggly Caliente (right) have been judges on Drag Race Philippines.

The Filipino adaptation of the series became the first in the franchise with two trans permanent judges: television personality KaladKaren and Jiggly Caliente, who had previously competed on the American series.

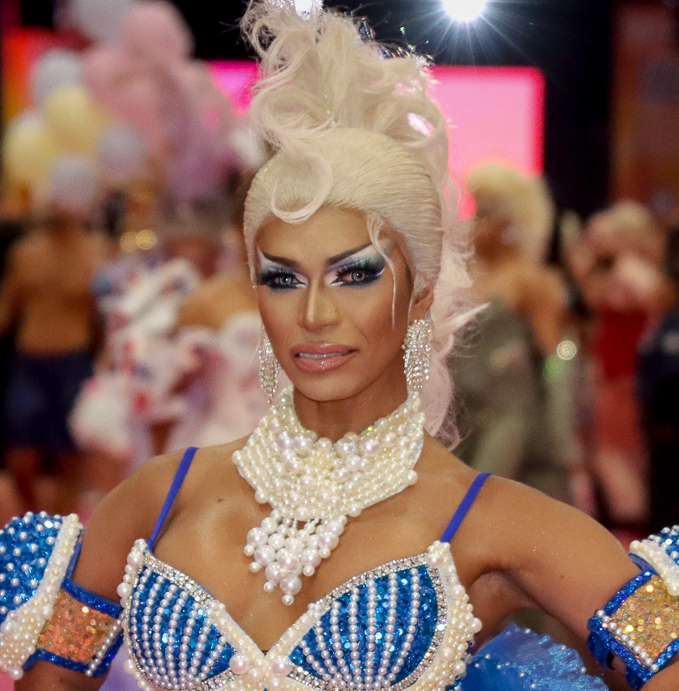
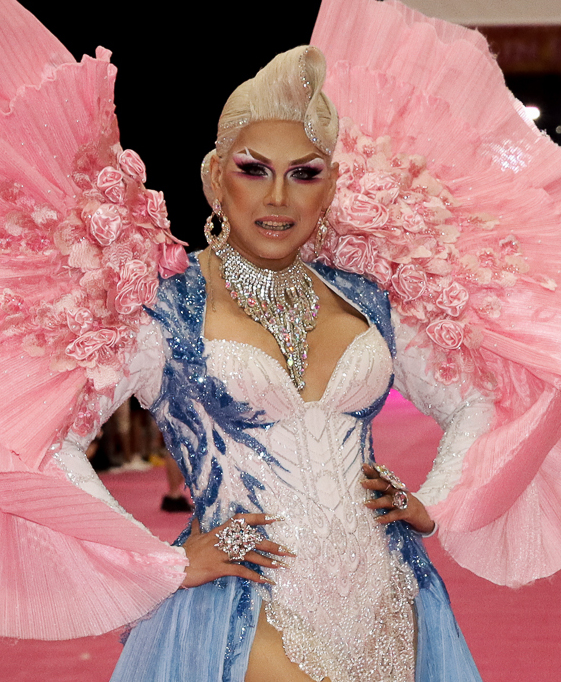
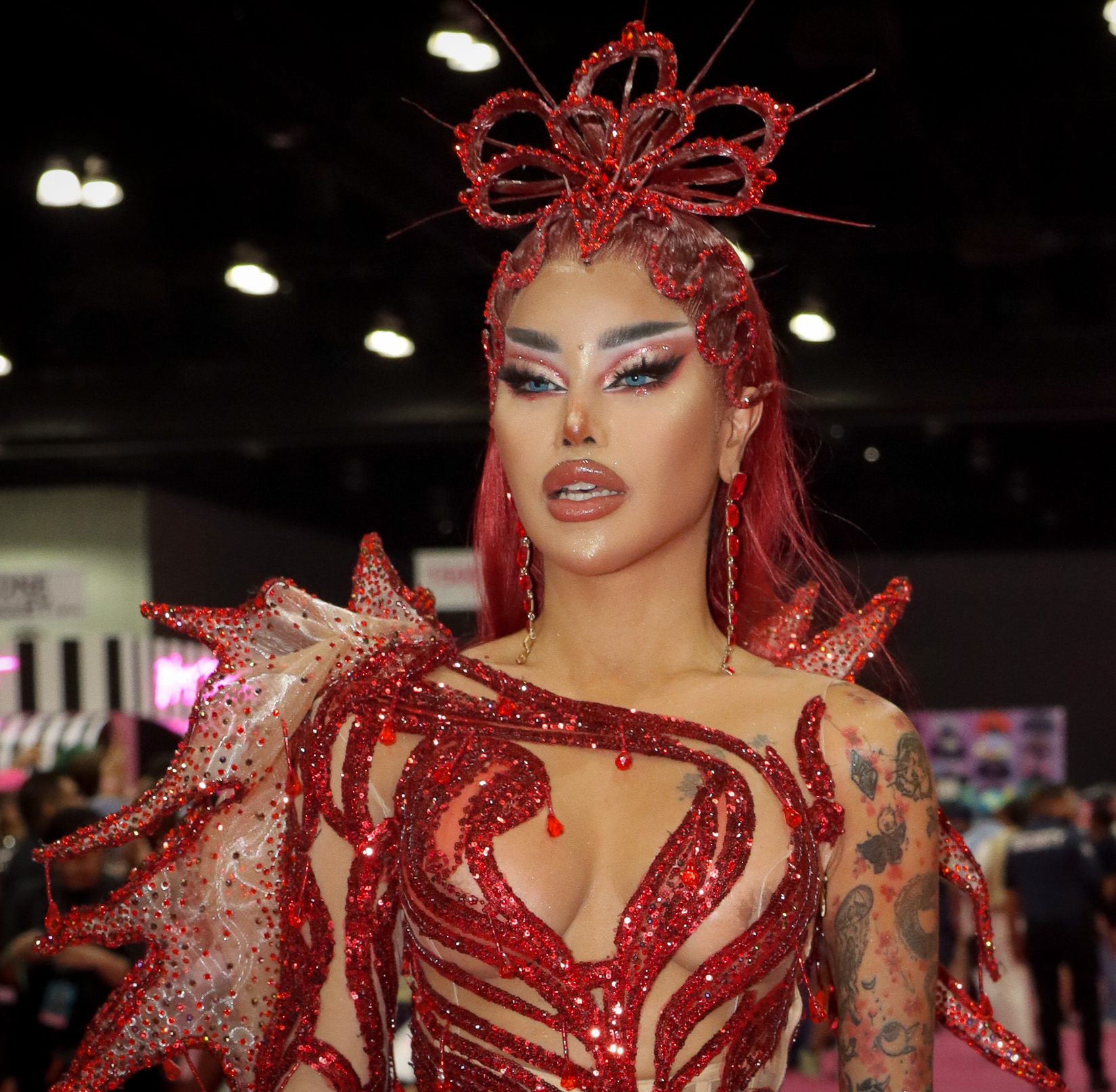
Bernie (left), Captivating Katkat (middle), and M1ss Jade So (right) competed on the second season of Drag Race Philippines.

Three trans contestants were cast for the show's second season (2023): Bernie, Captivating Katkat, and M1ss Jade So. Bernie and Captivating Katkat placed in the bottom two on the sixth episode and faced off in a lip-sync contest. The performance was dedicated to the trans community and resulted in neither contestant being eliminated from the competition. Captivating Katkat became the show's first trans winner and wore an outfit showcasing the trans flag and the text "trans women are women" stitched on the front.

Trans contestants Angel Galang, Popstar Bench, and Myx Chanel also competed on the show's third season (2024).

Kitty Space from the second season of Drag Race France is the first trans contestant from Drag Race Philippines: Slaysian Royale, an international All Stars spin-off series of Drag Race Philippines featuring contestants with Asian lineage across various Drag Race franchises competing against past contestants of Drag Race Philippines.

On February 7th 2025, Season 1 contestant Marina Summers, came out as a transgender woman.

== Drag Race Sverige ==
Trans contestants Endigo and Fontana competed on the Swedish adaptation of the show (2023).

== Drag Race Thailand ==
On the second season (2019) of the Thai adaptation of the series, Angele Anang became the first trans contestant to win a season of Drag Race. Trans contestants Meannie Minaj competed on the show's first season (2018), followed by Kandy Zyanide and Katy Killer, in addition to Anang, on the second season (2019) and Benze Diva & Zepee on the third season (2024).

== RuPaul's Drag Race UK and UK vs. the World ==
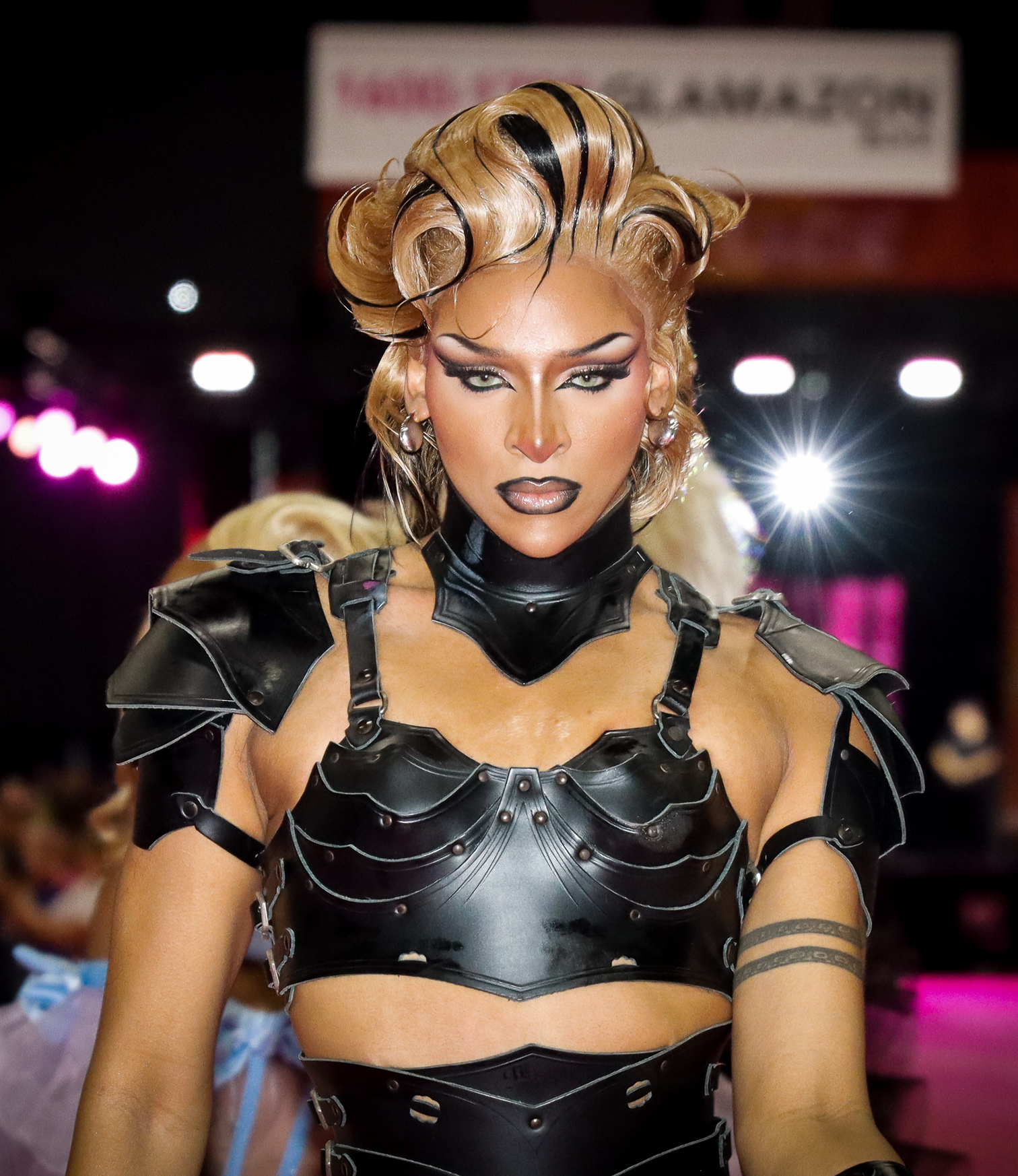
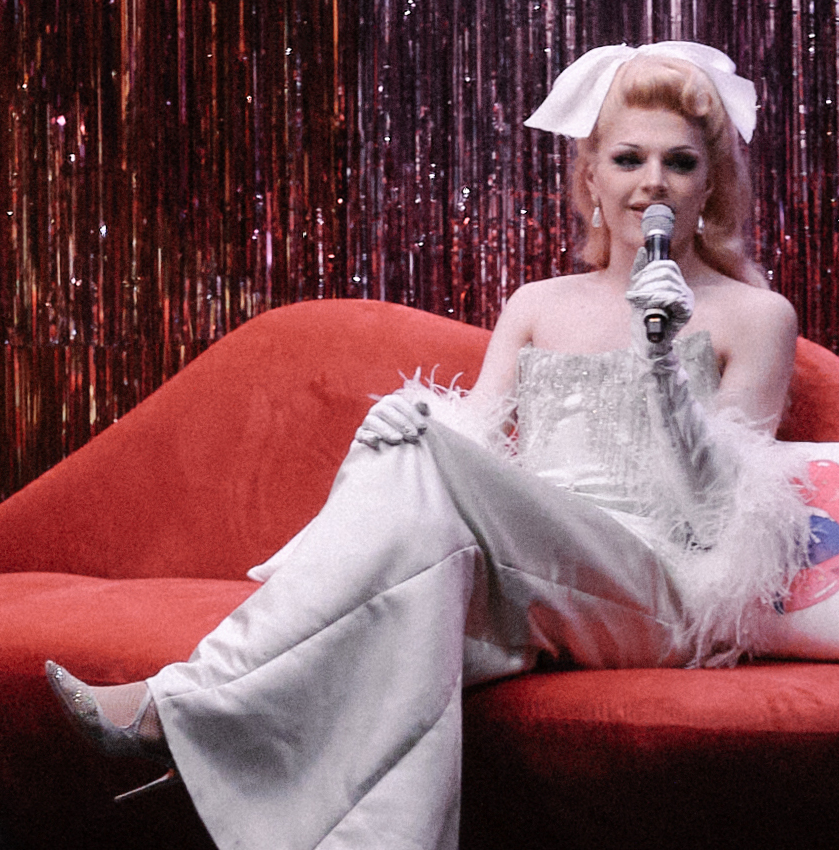
Cara Melle (left) and Dakota Schiffer (right) competed on RuPaul's Drag Race UK.

Trans contestants Cara Melle, Dakota Schiffer and Starlet have competed on the British adaptation of the series. Dakota Schiffer was the first trans contestant to compete on the series. Nyongbella competed on series 7. On the show, genderfluid contestant Bimini Bon-Boulash wore an outfit inspired by the trans flag.

Trans contestants, Arantxa Castilla-La Mancha, who originally competed in the first season of Drag Race España, and Marina Summers from the first season of Drag Race Philippines, competed in the second season of RuPaul's Drag Race: UK vs. the World; where Arantxa finished in 10th place and won the Miss Congeniality title & Marina finished in 4th/3rd place.

== See also ==
- List of transgender characters in television
- Media portrayals of transgender people
