= MacHenry Schafer =

American Presbyterian minister and LGBTQ rights activist

The Reverend MacHenry Schafer II
- Born: Washington, D.C., U.S.
- Education: Elon University (BS); Princeton Theological Seminary (MDiv); Pittsburgh Theological Seminary (DMin)
- Occupations: Pastor; Activist
- Spouse: Katy Schafer
- Children: 4 (including Hunter Schafer)
- Awards: Algernon Sydney Sullivan Award

Ecclesiastical career
- Religion: Christianity (Presbyterian)
- Church: Presbyterian Church (USA)
- Congregations: Pinnacle Presbyterian Church; Hudson Memorial Presbyterian Church; Doylestown Presbyterian Church

MacHenry G. Schafer II is an American Presbyterian pastor and transgender rights activist.

== Early life and education ==
Schafer was born in Washington, D.C. He was adopted and later moved with his adopted parents to Princeton, New Jersey for his father's job at Princeton University. He was raised Episcopalian and attended services at Trinity Church.

Schafer majored in psychology at Elon University, where he was a recipient of the Algernon Sydney Sullivan Award. He received a master of divinity from Princeton Theological Seminary and a doctorate of ministry from Pittsburgh Theological Seminary.

== Career ==
=== LGBTQ activism ===
Schafer supported their daughter, Hunter, who is a trans woman, as a plaintiff in the American Civil Liberties Union's lawsuit against the Public Facilities Privacy & Security Act, an anti-transgender statute signed into law by North Carolina Governor Pat McCrory in 2016. He also participated in the Campaign for Southern Equality, calling for protections of LGBTQ people across North Carolina.

In 2021, Schafer endorsed the Equality Act and called on North Carolina senators Thom Tillis and Richard Burr to support the bill.

=== Ministry ===
Schafer is a senior pastor in the Presbyterian Church (USA). After college, he worked as a youth minister at First Presbyterian Church in North Palm Beach, Florida. While in seminary, he became the associate pastor at the Presbyterian Church of Lawrenceville, New Jersey. Schafer then served as an associate pastor and interim head of staff at Pinnacle Presbyterian Church in Scottsdale, Arizona. He went on to serve as pastor and head of staff at Hudson Memorial Presbyterian Church in Raleigh, North Carolina for fifteen years. While at Hudson Memorial, he served on the New Hope Presbytery's commission on ministry, was a commissioner to the general assembly, chaired the bills and transfers commission, and served on the exams and transfers commission and the conflict transformation team. In December 2024, Schafer became the senior pastor and head of staff at Doylestown Presbyterian Church in Doylestown, Pennsylvania.

He is a coordinator with the American Pilgrims on the Camino, training people for international pilgrimages. He has made pilgrimages to the Camino de Santiago, Portuguese Way, Via Francigena, and St Cuthbert's Way.

== Personal life ==
Schafer and his wife, Katy, have four children, including Hunter Schafer.
