= Cuckoo (2024 film) =

Film by Tilman Singer

- Theatrical release poster
- Directed by: Tilman Singer
- Written by: Tilman Singer
- Produced by: Markus Halberschmidt; Josh Rosenbaum; Maria Tsigka; Ken Kao; Thor Bradwell; Ben Rimmer
- Starring: Hunter Schafer; Jan Bluthardt; Marton Csokas; Jessica Henwick; Dan Stevens
- Cinematography: Paul Faltz
- Edited by: Terel Gibson; Philipp Thomas
- Music by: Simon Waskow
- Production companies: Neon; Fiction Park; Waypoint Entertainment
- Distributed by: Weltkino Filmverleih (Germany); Neon (United States)
- Release dates: February 16, 2024 (Berlinale); August 9, 2024 (United States); August 29, 2024 (Germany)
- Running time: 103 minutes
- Countries: Germany; United States
- Languages: English; German; French
- Budget: $7 million
- Box office: $6.7 million

Cuckoo is a 2024 horror film written and directed by Tilman Singer, and starring Hunter Schafer, Jan Bluthardt, Marton Csokas, Jessica Henwick, and Dan Stevens. A co-production between Germany and the United States, the film follows a teenager (Schafer) who moves to the German Alps to live with her father (Csokas) but becomes disturbed by strange occurrences as her father's boss (Stevens) embroils her family in a sinister plot.

Cuckoo had its world premiere at the 74th Berlin International Film Festival on February 16, 2024. The film was released theatrically in the United States on August 9, 2024, and in Germany on August 29. It received generally positive reviews from critics and grossed $6.7 million.

== Plot ==
After the death of her mother, grief-stricken teenager Gretchen moves with her father Luis, stepmother Beth, and mute half-sister Alma to a resort town in the Bavarian Alps. The family is there to help build a new hotel, overseen by the enigmatic Herr König, who offers Gretchen a job at the front desk to help her adjust. Soon after their arrival, strange things begin to happen. Gretchen encounters multiple female guests vomiting, Alma suffers seizures triggered by a mysterious reverberating shriek, and Gretchen has a terrifying encounter with a hooded woman while biking home one night, but the incident is dismissed by police as a prank.

Gretchen meets a detective named Henry who is investigating a murder linked to the hooded woman. She also becomes close to a female guest named Ed, and the two plan to run away together. However, their escape attempt is thwarted when they hear the disorienting shriek, nearly run over the hooded woman, and crash their car, leaving Gretchen severely injured and confined to the resort as Ed recovers in the hospital. Henry explains to Gretchen that he believes the hooded woman is responsible for at least one murder, which ended in the female victim choking on her own vomit. He believes that one of the vomiting women whom Gretchen saw earlier may be connected. She and Henry stake out a cottage, where the hooded woman attacks Gretchen's coworker, Trixie, in an attempt to implant her with a mysterious slime.

The next day, Gretchen confronts Luis and König, expressing her disapproval of their involvement in the resort. During the argument, König accidentally reveals a package addressed to the family containing items belonging to Gretchen's mother. Luis confesses that he sold their old family home. Enraged, Gretchen retreats to her room and listens to her mother's old voicemails. Among them, she hears a voicemail from Alma, using text-to-speech, imploring Gretchen's mother to contact Gretchen to make her happy.

Gretchen emerges from her room to find her family missing. König tells her that Alma had another seizure, and they took her to the hospital. He says that he will take her to the nearest train station so she can run away, but first, they will drive to his house so he can give her some money. There, König reveals the truth: Henry is a disgraced police officer, and the hooded woman is not human but a member of a near-human species that relies on brood parasitism, much like cuckoo birds. These cuckoos use their shrieks to disorient humans and trigger the development of their young. The cuckoos' young, like Alma, are implanted within human surrogates, and raised until they are ready to join their true kind. König has been experimenting with preserving this species at the resort, where Beth and Luis unwittingly stayed during their honeymoon years ago. König locks Gretchen in a pool house and uses a flute to summon a teenage specimen of the species. The adolescent cuckoo is drawn to Gretchen and attempts to inseminate her using slime. However, Henry arrives just in time, shooting König and killing the creature.

Henry and Gretchen race to the hospital, where König had prepared to reunite Alma with her true mother, the hooded woman. Gretchen realizes that Henry intends to kill not only the adult cuckoo but Alma as well. Desperate to save her sister, Gretchen stabs Henry with her butterfly knife. Gretchen reaches Alma and keeps the mother at bay by feigning a threat to stab Alma. Alma misunderstands and flees. Giving chase, Gretchen is pursued by the mother. Gretchen uses a pair of headphones to muffle the mother's screeching and stabs the mother in the throat, killing her.

Gretchen reunites with Alma, regaining her trust by thanking her for her message to her mother. They find the still-alive König and the injured Henry in a standoff. Seeing both of the men threatening them with guns, Alma covers Gretchen's ears and lets out a powerful shriek, disorienting both men long enough for the sisters to escape. Henry and König shoot each other dead. Outside, the sisters are met by a recovering Ed, who drives the girls to safety, and the three flee the resort.

== Cast ==
- Hunter Schafer as Gretchen
- Jan Bluthardt as Henry
- Marton Csokas as Luis
- Jessica Henwick as Beth
- Dan Stevens as Herr König
- Mila Lieu as Alma
- Greta Fernández as Trixie
- Proschat Madani as Dr. Bonomo
- Àstrid Bergès-Frisbey as Ed
- Konrad Singer as Erik
- Kalin Morrow as the Hooded Woman

== Production ==
It was reported in August 2021 that Tilman Singer would be writing and directing his second film for Neon, with Hunter Schafer, John Malkovich, Gemma Chan, and Sofia Boutella set to star. In July 2022, Dan Stevens, Jessica Henwick, Marton Csokas, and Greta Fernández joined the cast, while Malkovich and Chan dropped out due to "timing issues".

Cuckoo was co-produced by Düsseldorf-based Fiction Park and the United States' Waypoint Entertainment.

Principal photography took place in North Rhine-Westphalia over a span of 35 days from May to July 2022 and was shot on 35 mm film.

== Release ==
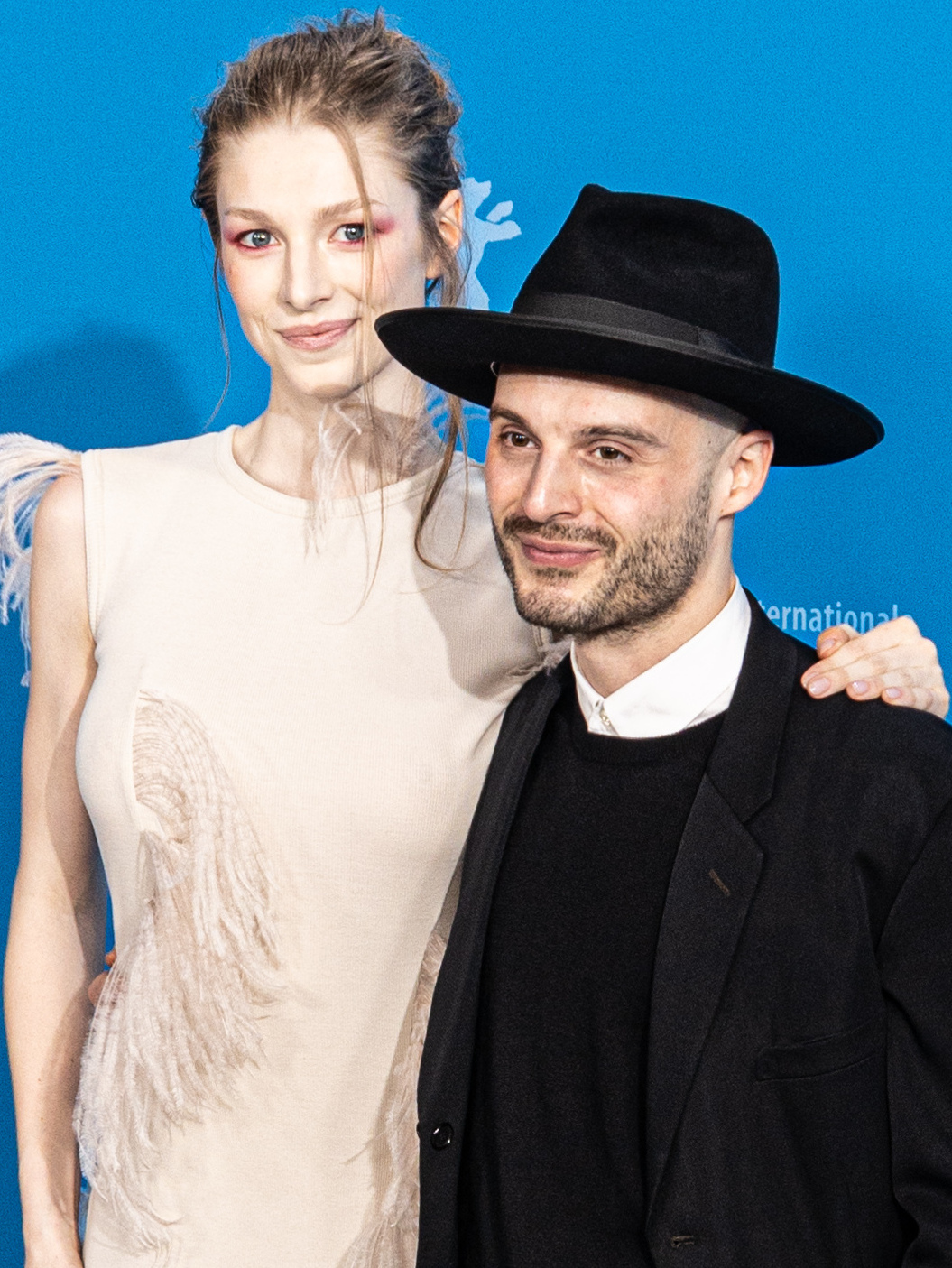
Hunter Schafer and Tilman Singer at the 74th Berlin International Film Festival

Cuckoo had its world premiere at the 74th Berlin International Film Festival in the Berlinale Special Gala section on February 16, 2024. The film also screened at South by Southwest on March 14 and at the Overlook Film Festival on April 4. It opened at London's Raindance Film Festival on June 19, 2024, as part of the festival's special focus on Germany, and was also screened at the 28th Fantasia International Film Festival on July 30, 2024.

The film was originally set to be released in the United States by Neon on May 3, 2024, but the release date was pushed back to August 9, 2024. Cuckoo was released in the United Kingdom by Universal Pictures on August 23, 2024, and in Germany by Weltkino Filmverleih on August 29, 2024.

== Reception ==
=== Box office ===
In the United States and Canada, Cuckoo was released alongside Borderlands and It Ends with Us, and made $1.4 million on its first day, including $435,000 from Thursday night previews. It went on to debut to $3 million from 1,503 theaters. The film made $873,296 in its second weekend (a drop of 71%), and by its third weekend lost 1,152 of its theaters and made $165,747.

=== Critical response ===
On the review aggregator website Rotten Tomatoes, 78% of 176 critics' reviews are positive, with an average rating of 6.6/10. The website's consensus reads: "Directed with inventive flair by Tilman Singer while given flavorful personality by stars Hunter Schafer and Dan Stevens, Cuckoo is a madcap madhouse horror that's on the right side of deranged." Metacritic, which uses a weighted average, assigned the film a score of 62 out of 100, based on 38 critics, indicating "generally favorable" reviews. Audiences polled by CinemaScore gave the film an average grade of "C+" on an A+ to F scale, while those surveyed by PostTrak gave it a 68% positive score.

Schafer and Stevens' performances were praised. BJ Colangelo of Slashfilm wrote, "Schafer's strong-willed, straight-shooting, absolutely sensational performance is the anchor in this chaotic storm. ... Schafer commands every scene". Adam Solomons of IndieWire called Schafer's performance "impressive" but gave the film a C− grade, writing, "The biggest crime of Cuckoo is that it won't lean into being a B-movie, something it might've been good at. The performances - especially Stevens's - are silly and sincere, and the action competent enough for Cuckoo to have worked as pure pulp. But this film takes itself too seriously and pokes fun at its own silliness, a fatal combination". RogerEbert.com's Robert Daniels also praised Stevens, noting, "Every choice Stevens makes as Mr. König doubles as a lampoon and a threat, as equally hilarious and sadistic". Jessica Kiang of Variety called the film "an energetically outlandish fusion of stylish atmospherics, old-school reproductive horror and pro-flickknife advertorial".

The Hollywood Reporter's David Rooney ended his review with, "It's ultimately too silly to be truly chilling, but with Neon behind it, Cuckoo might just be cuckoo enough to draw some cult attention". German critic Dieter Osswald wrote, "Tilman Singer pours out his fantasy cornucopia of horrific sequences with obvious pleasure and elegant nonchalance".

=== Accolades ===
Accolades received by Broken Heart's Trip
Award	Date of ceremony	Category	Recipient(s)	Result	Ref.
Brussels International Fantastic Film Festival	April 21, 2024	International Competition	Cuckoo	Won	
36th GLAAD Media Awards	March 27, 2025	Outstanding Film - Wide Release	Cuckoo	Nominated	
40th Independent Spirit Awards	February 22, 2025	Best Lead Performance	Hunter Schafer	Nominated	
23rd Neuchâtel International Fantastic Film Festival	July 13, 2024	Best Feature Film	Cuckoo	Nominated	
2024 South by Southwest	March 13, 2024	Narrative Spotlight	Cuckoo	Nominated	
Golden Trailer Awards 2024	May 30, 2024	Best Horror	Cuckoo	Nominated	
Raindance Film Festival	June 28, 2024	Best International Feature	Cuckoo	Nominated	
Music + Sound Awards	October 16, 2024	Best Original Composition in a Film Trailer	Will Quiney, William Arcane	Won	
North Carolina Film Critics Association	January 3, 2025	Ken Hanke Memorial Tar Heel Award	Hunter Schafer	Nominated	
Queerty Awards	March 11, 2025	Film Performance	Hunter Schafer	Nominated	
2024 Preis der deutschen Filmkritik	January 21, 2025	Best Cinematography	Paul Faltz	Nominated	
