= Luz (2018 film) =

2018 German horror film

- Film poster
- Directed by: Tilman Singer
- Written by: Tilman Singer
- Produced by: Dario Méndez Acosta; Tilman Singer; Mario von Grumbkow
- Starring: Luana Velis; Jan Bluthardt; Julia Riedler; Nadja Stübiger; Johannes Benecke; Lilli Lorenz
- Cinematography: Paul Faltz
- Edited by: Fabian Podeszwa; Tilman Singer
- Music by: Simon Waskow
- Distributed by: Yellow Veil Pictures
- Release dates: February 20, 2018 (Berlin); March 21, 2019 (Germany)
- Running time: 70 minutes
- Country: Germany
- Languages: German; Spanish; English

Luz is a 2018 German supernatural horror film written, produced, edited and directed by Tilman Singer in his directorial debut. It stars Luana Velis as the titular character, a taxi driver who is questioned by the police following a mysterious accident.

== Plot ==
After getting into a car crash, taxi driver Luz is brought to the police station for questioning. A doctor attempts to hypnotize her and gather information about the night. However, the doctor is possessed by an ancient demon that Luz summoned during her stay at a religious school back in her youth.

== Cast ==
- Luana Velis as Luz Carrara
- Jan Bluthardt as Dr. Rossini
- Julia Riedler as Nora Vanderkurt
- Nadja Stübiger as Bertillon
- Johannes Benecke as Olarte
- Lilli Lorenz as Margarita

== Production and release ==
The film is Singer's film school thesis project and a homage to 1980s European horror films. After debuting at the 2018 Berlin Film Festival, Yellow Veil Pictures was formed to purchase the release ahead of the 2018 Fantasia Film Festival.

== Critical reception ==
Metacritic, which uses a weighted average, assigned the film a score of 63 out of 100, based on 12 critics, indicating "generally favorable" reviews. On the review aggregator website Rotten Tomatoes, 87% of 61 critics' reviews are positive, with an average rating of 7/10. The site's critical consensus reads, "Luz takes a refreshingly unique approach to horror possession tropes, elevated by a chilly mood and minimalist scares." Katie Rife of The A.V. Club gave the film a B rating, praising its attention to sound and how it advanced the horror genre's retro sensibilities, summing up the work as "unapologetically weird and utterly fearless". Variety praised the experimental technique, commenting that the film's chronology can be debatable and its plot incoherent, but this style compels "our imaginations to see things other than what’s immediately before us".

== See also ==
- 2019 in film
