= Hunter Schafer =

American actress and model (born 1998)

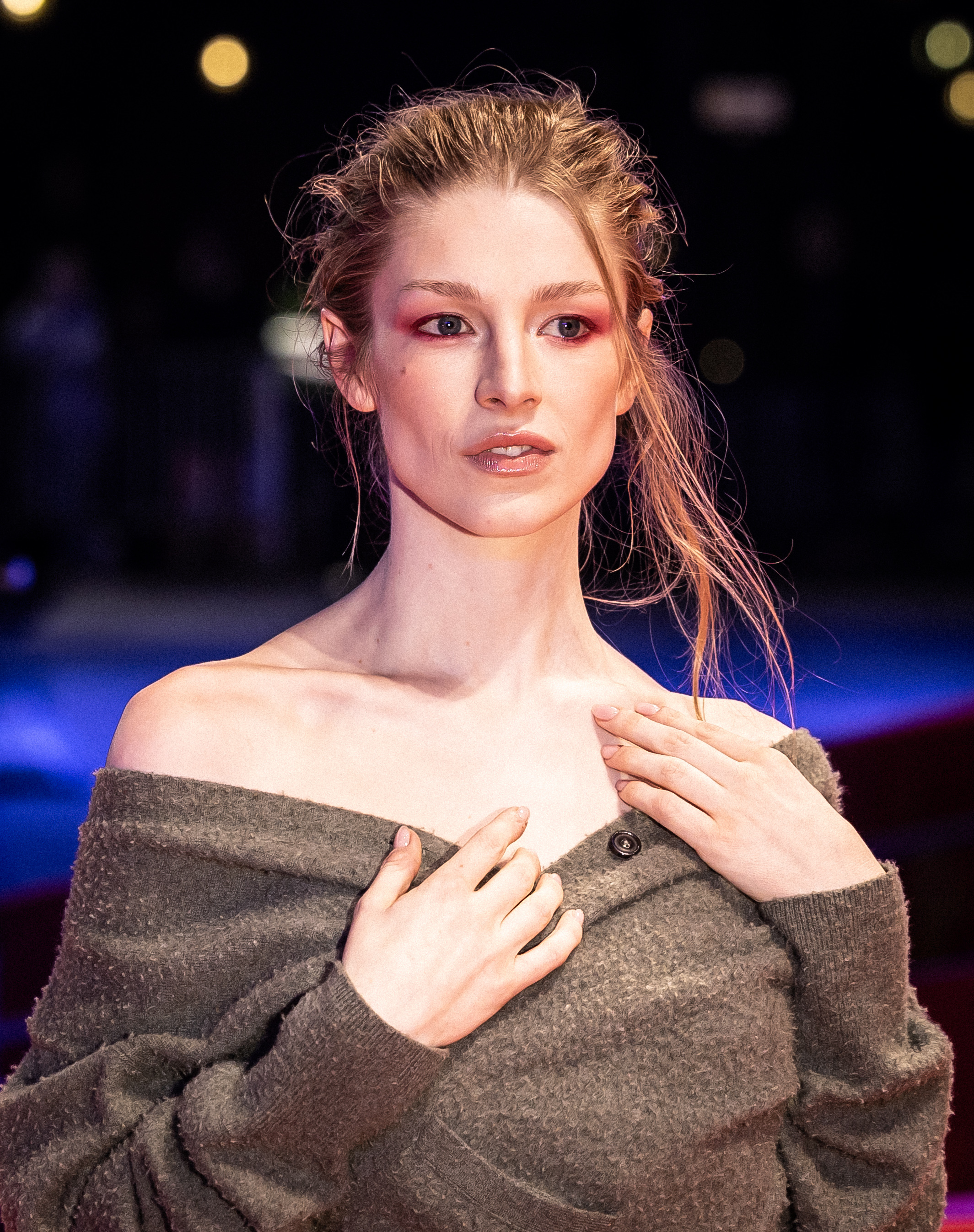
- Schafer at the 2024 Berlinale
- Born: December 31, 1998 (age 27); Trenton, New Jersey, U.S.
- Education: North Carolina School of the Arts
- Occupations: Actress; model; activist
- Years active: 2017–present
- Father: MacHenry Schafer

Hunter Schafer (born December 31, 1998) is an American actress, model, and activist. Born in New Jersey and raised in North Carolina, she came to public attention after joining a 2016 lawsuit against North Carolina's Public Facilities Privacy & Security Act, a later-repealed "bathroom bill" which prevented transgender people such as herself from using public bathrooms corresponding to their gender identity. For her activism, she was named in Teen Vogue's "21 Under 21" list in 2017.

Schafer has studied both watercolor painting and clothing design. In 2017, she began modeling for various fashion brands. She planned to further pursue clothing design, but instead turned to acting when she was cast in the HBO teen drama television series Euphoria (2019–2026). She helped develop her character of transgender high school student Jules Vaughn, one of the first leading characters on American TV to be both trans and played by a trans person. Her performance and co-writing credit on an episode of Euphoria garnered critical praise.

Schafer has since starred in the films The Hunger Games: The Ballad of Songbirds & Snakes (2023), Cuckoo (2024), and Mother Mary (2026), and had minor roles in Kinds of Kindness (2024) and the English dub of the Japanese film Belle (2021). Schafer has continued modeling after getting into acting, serving as brand ambassador for Shiseido Makeup, Prada, and Mugler.

== Early life and activism ==
Schafer was born on December 31, 1998, in Trenton, New Jersey. Her father, MacHenry G. Schafer II, is a Presbyterian senior pastor, and the family moved between churches and congregations in New Jersey, Arizona, and finally Raleigh, North Carolina, where Schafer was raised. She has three younger siblings: two sisters and a brother. Schafer said she started expressing femininity as a toddler. In seventh grade, Schafer came out to her parents as a gay boy, and started experiencing gender dysphoria in eighth grade. In ninth grade, she came out as a transgender girl and began transitioning after being diagnosed with dysphoria. She had also questioned if she had a non-binary identity. She stated that the Internet helped her cope with her gender identity, as she turned to YouTube and social media to learn about people's transition timelines.

Schafer first made headlines in 2016 when she became the youngest name listed as a plaintiff on a lawsuit filed by the ACLU and Lambda Legal, Carcaño v. McCrory, against the Public Facilities Privacy & Security Act. The bill prevented trans people from using the bathroom corresponding to their gender identity, instead deciding bathroom usage based on their assigned sex at birth. The lawsuit led to the bill's repeal. While acting as a plaintiff, she made a film protesting the bill, which was released by the online magazine Rookie. She also wrote about the bill in a widely-shared essay for Teen Vogue in July 2016. For her activism, including her activism against the Act, Teen Vogue listed Schafer on its 2017 "21 Under 21" list of women and femme trailblazers under the age of 21 and granted her an interview with Hillary Clinton.

In early childhood, Schafer developed skills in visual arts, including watercolor painting; in high school, she used these skills to design clothes. The inspirations for her visual style were Tim Burton and Skottie Young. She posted watercolor and photography works on her Instagram account, which became popular. Her clothing designs, which often incorporated political activist messaging, were profiled by Huffington Post in 2017. She contributed illustrations and comic art to Rookie, as well as essays. She went to Needham B. Broughton High School and transferred to the North Carolina School of the Arts, where she graduated from its high school visual arts program. In 2017, Schafer became a semifinalist in the U.S. Presidential Scholars Program.

== Career ==
=== Modeling and acting in Euphoria (2017–2020) ===
Schafer started modeling shortly after high school. She wanted to use the privileges of "looking like a model" to deconstruct ideas regarding gender identity. In 2017, she signed with Elite Model Management after meeting an agent of theirs on Instagram, so she moved to Brooklyn to model in New York City. She first worked with Dior and Marc Jacobs, among other brands, and by the end of the year she had modeled for Converse, Gucci, Helmut Lang, and Versus Versace. In early 2018, she walked for nine fashion houses including Marc Jacobs, Miu Miu, and House of Holland. She made her debut at New York Fashion Week and traveled abroad for the first time to model in Europe. She started appearing in fashion magazines around the world; Marie Claire wrote: "the fashion industry embraced Schafer for her ethereal yet edgy look and cool-kid versatility". She has also modeled for multiple other brands. (Note: Schafer has modeled for Prada, Calvin Klein, Rick Owens, Tommy Hilfiger, Thierry Mugler, Coach, Maison Margiela, Vera Wang, Emilio Pucci, Ann Demeulemeester, and Erdem, among other houses.)

After high school, Schafer planned to attend Central Saint Martins, an arts college in London, where she was accepted, to study clothing design for non-binary people. She also wanted to open a studio and gallery for trans artists in New York, using grant money she had received from Teen Vogue for her "21 Under 21" listing. However, she decided to focus on acting after she was cast in the HBO series Euphoria as a transgender high school girl, Jules Vaughn in 2019. She joined the show after finding a casting call for transgender girls on Instagram, which required no previous acting experience. A few days later, her modeling agency told her she received the audition. She did her final audition in Los Angeles, filmed the show's pilot there a month later, and moved to Los Angeles to film the first season. At the time, trans television characters were rare (GLAAD found there were 17 trans characters on television in 2017 and 2018), as were trans actors playing them. She worked with the show's creator, Sam Levinson, to make sure Jules's trans experiences were accurate. Jules was praised by Vulture for not being a victim of violence like most trans women on screen; she stands up for herself, rather than being a passive victim of the men around her. Schafer also worked with the show's costume designer, Heidi Bivens, to make Jules' wardrobe.

Schafer's performance was widely praised. Paper magazine wrote that Euphoria being her acting debut "will be hard for viewers to tell from the get-go". For the role, she received a Shorty Award, an MTV Movie & TV Award, and a Dorian Award. The Advocate wrote that she was one of many transgender actors not nominated at the 2020 Primetime Emmy Awards who should have been. In 2020, Queerty named her among the 50 queer people "leading the nation toward equality, acceptance, and dignity for all people". In 2021, Schafer co-wrote an episode of Euphoria that was released between its first and second seasons, titled "Fuck Anyone Who's Not a Sea Blob". The episode, which features Jules in therapy describing her experiences in womanhood, was critically acclaimed.

In 2024, following Euphoria's second season, Schafer's Cuckoo co-star Dan Stevens said that her experience filming Euphoria was "by all accounts, not a terribly pleasant one", and that filming Cuckoo was "refreshing and delightful for her", as "we can still shoot [this] difficult scene, but everybody's still friends, [and] nobody needs to have months of therapy afterwards". Reporting on Stevens' comments, IndieWire noted regarding Euphoria's production that there had been "reports of a toxic workplace environment led by [...] Sam Levinson".

=== Film roles and brand ambassadorships (2020–present) ===
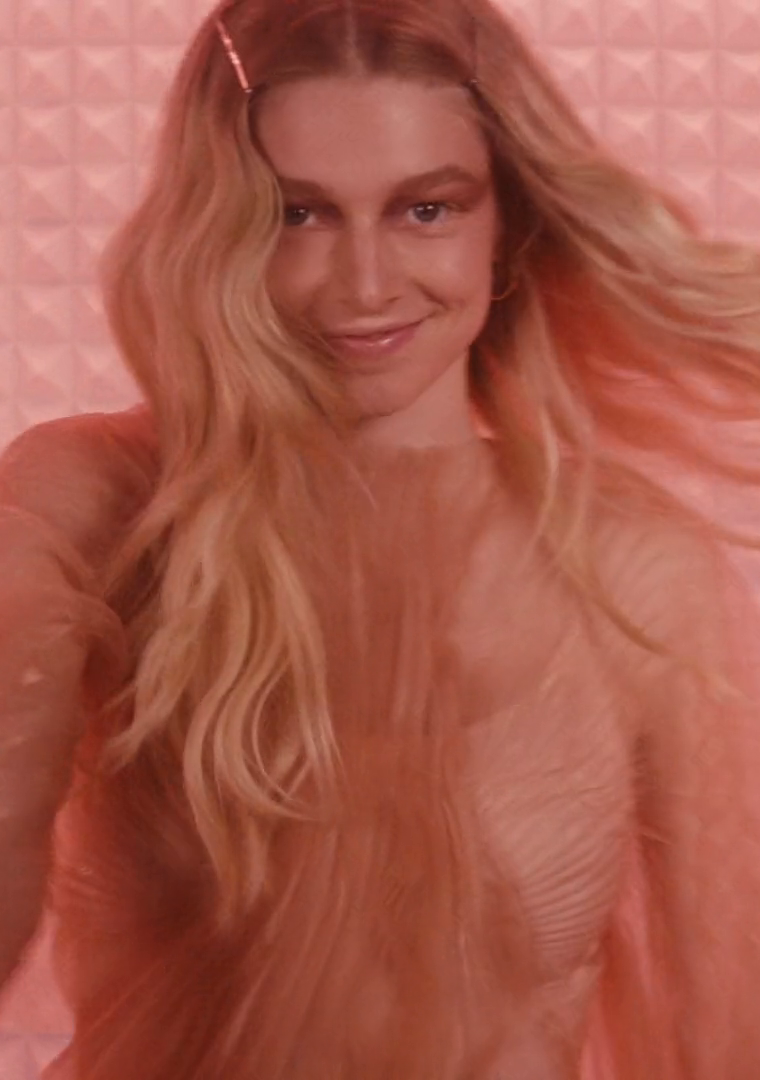
Schafer in a video for Shiseido in 2021

In 2020, she became the global brand ambassador for Shiseido Makeup, and in 2021, Prada announced Schafer as their new house ambassador. Also in 2021, Time named her to its Next list of "100 emerging leaders who are shaping the future", with a tribute written by Euphoria co-star Zendaya. In 2022, Schafer starred in the English dub of the Japanese animated film Belle, and she made her directorial debut when making the music video for Girl in Red's song hornylovesickmess. She directed the video for Anohni and the Johnsons' song "Why Am I Alive Now?" the following year. She became the new face of Mugler's Angel perfume in 2023 and one of their ambassadors.

Schafer starred in the 2023 The Hunger Games prequel, The Hunger Games: The Ballad of Songbirds & Snakes, for which her performance as Tigris Snow was praised as "excellent" and "underused". Director Francis Lawrence said that Schafer was chosen for the part due to her disarming authenticity and described how her audition performance was "endearing and warm"—qualities they wanted for Tigris.

Schafer has continued modeling throughout her acting career, appearing for Alexander McQueen, Prada and Schiaparelli, among other houses. At the after party held by Vanity Fair for the 95th Academy Awards in 2023, she wore only a white maxi skirt and a top which was simply a horizontal feather covering her nipples, attached to a thin strap; W magazine wrote the outfit, designed by Ludovic de Saint Sernin for the Ann Demeulemeester label, became "infamous", being "the talk of the Oscars after parties" and "[setting] the Internet ablaze". Spanish pop singer Rosalía later referenced Schafer's outfit by wearing the top and similar pants for a photoshoot that included the eventual cover art of her 2025 album Lux (though she wears an additional top in the cover photo). Since the press tour for Songbirds & Snakes, Schafer has been stylized by Dara Allen, whom she first met when they both started modelling in 2017; Allen has characterized Schafer as one of her best friends, and some have attributed part of Schafer's fashion success to their collaboration.

In 2024, Schafer was in Cuckoo, a horror movie directed by Tilman Singer. She plays an American teenager who reluctantly visits a creepy, remote resort in Germany with her family. It was her first lead role in a feature film; Schafer called it a scary experience, as it was the first thing she starred in after Euphoria, describing it as "the training wheels" turning off. Her portrayal was said to be "an intense and emotional central performance". Also in 2024, she was in one scene of Yorgos Lanthimos's anthology film Kinds of Kindness. In 2025, Schafer starred in The Hunt, a horror short film directed by Nadia Lee Cohen to promote the autumn 2025 campaign of South Korean eyewear brand Gentle Monster. In 2026, she was in David Lowery's drama film Mother Mary.

In 2025, a reputable leaker of Hollywood insider information reported that Schafer was first in consideration for the role of Princess Zelda in the upcoming live-action film adaptation of Nintendo's The Legend of Zelda video game series. The role was later announced to go to Bo Bragason. The initial rumor had created a significant amount of both supportive and transphobic reactions online and in the media; multiple outlets theorized the casting of Bragason, a cisgender woman, was a response by Nintendo to avoid further transphobic backlash, but this has not been confirmed.

Schafer has upcoming roles in Tom Ford's drama film Cry to Heaven, an adaptation of Anne Rice's novel; Zach Strauss' directorial debut horror film, Palette; Hideo Kojima's horror video game OD, the Amazon sci-fi television series Blade Runner 2099, and a currently untitled horror film by Arkasha Stevenson.

She has attended the Met Gala in 2021, 2025, and 2026. For two of those years, she has worn Prada.

== Personal life ==
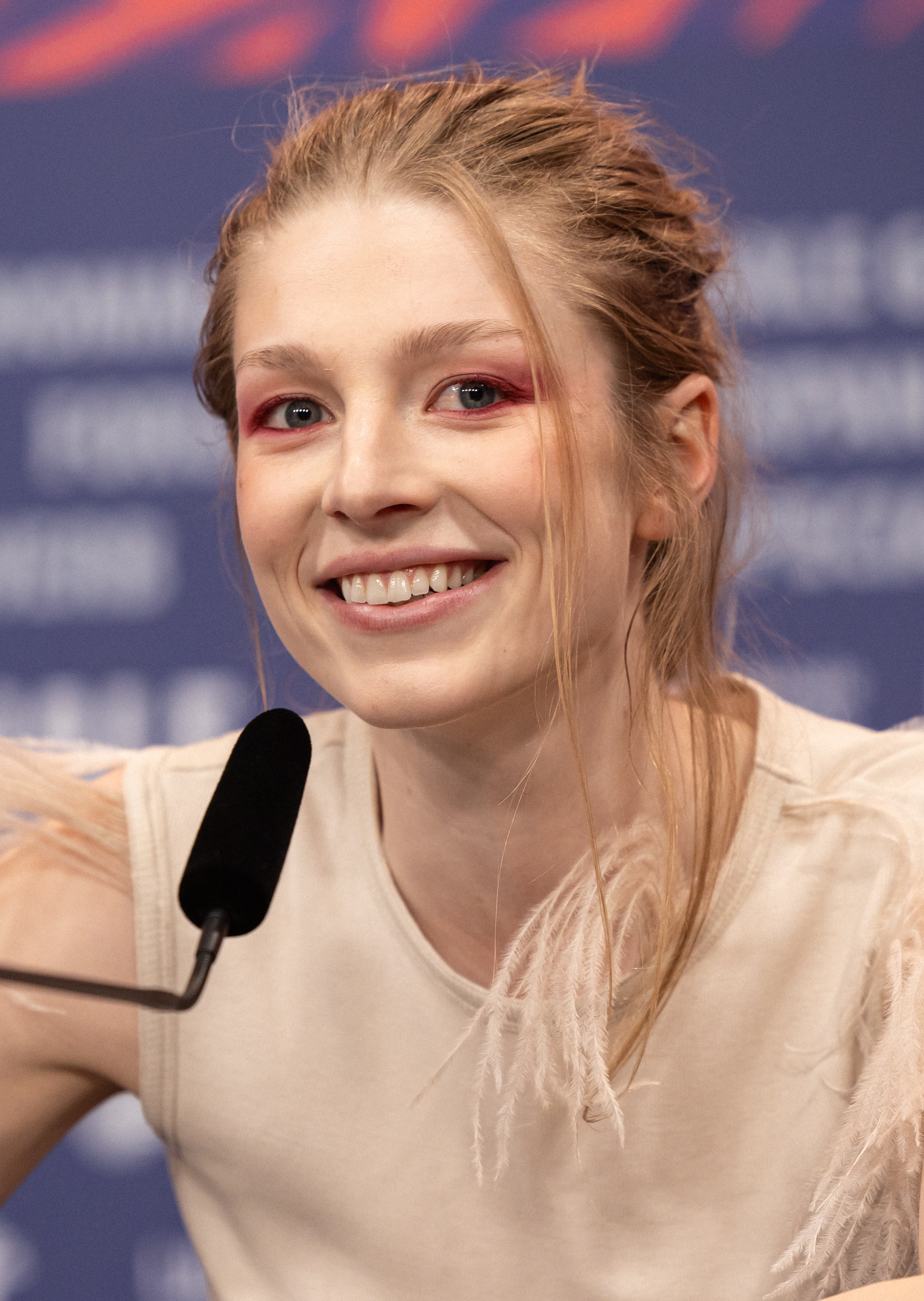
Schafer at the 74th Berlin International Film Festival in 2024, for the promotion of Cuckoo

In 2019, Schafer said that she was "closer to what you might call a lesbian", and in 2021, she stated she was "bi or pan or something". She also said in 2019 that she used she/her pronouns, but also used the title of "Mx. Schafer".

Schafer was in a relationship with Rosalía for five months in 2019, which she confirmed in 2024 after speculation. They remained close friends, and Schafer considers Rosalía to be "family no matter what". Schafer dated her Euphoria co-star Dominic Fike from February 2022 to c. July 2023. She claims their relationship ended after she found out he cheated on her.

In October 2026, Schafer revealed that she had undergone gender-affirming bottom surgery in December 2025. Schafer described the procedure as "amazing" and said "I love it so much."

=== Views and later activism ===
In 2016, Schafer stated, "I do like people to know that I'm not a cis girl because that's not something that I am or feel like I am." However, in 2024, she told GQ that she would like to talk about her trans identity less, as she had moved on from the most difficult parts of her transition and just wanted to "be a girl"; she lamented that her identity had become the centerpiece of her career, giving her offers for "tons of trans roles", which she started declining. She also told Rolling Stone that said she could not be considered a transgender activist: "No. I'm just a tranny who's famous, you know?" In 2024, she told Vogue that she tries to balance not being seen only as the "trans starlet" while also managing to fulfill her "responsibility of representation", saying: "All the time I'm kind of doing the math of when to reel it in and when to lean into it".

In 2022, Schafer liked and commented "!!!!!" on an Instagram post that criticized certain non-binary activists who "fought to have trans identities no longer [be] considered" by the medical world "as a medical condition that requires [gender] dysphoria", and "couldn't stand to let binary trans people be the voice of [the trans] community", linking such activism to U.S. legislation targeting transgender rights. This prompted accusations that Schafer had endorsed transmedicalism; she denied this, saying she merely felt there was "an [imbalance] in the visibility and space taken up between non-binary folks and binary trans women (particularly those of color and/or those who have [resorted] to sex work as a means of survival) that [I] think deserves attention/re-evaluation (as far as resources and platforms go) within the LGBTQ+ community".

On February 27, 2024, Schafer and fifty other people were arrested in New York City while at a Jewish Voice for Peace protest advocating for a ceasefire in the Gaza war. The protest was outside 30 Rockefeller Center, intended to disrupt U.S. president Joe Biden's interview for Late Night with Seth Meyers, which was being taped inside.

In February 2025, Schafer uploaded a TikTok video in which she criticized the Trump administration and the U.S. Department of State for changing her passport gender marker from female to male without her consent or knowledge. She stated the following day that she spoke out because "it's important to just keep track of where things are in our country". Marcy Rheintgen, believed to be the first person arrested under Florida's Facility Requirements Based on Sex Act, described Schafer as a personal hero who inspired her to challenge the law after Schafer was issued the male passport.

== Filmography ==
Key
†	Denotes films that have not yet been released

=== Film ===
Films of Hunter Schafer
Year	Title	Role	Notes	Ref.
2022	Belle	Ruka "Ruka-chan" Watanabe	Voice role; English dub	
2023	The Hunger Games: The Ballad of Songbirds & Snakes	Tigris Snow		
2024	Cuckoo	Gretchen		
2024	Kinds of Kindness	Anna		
2026	Mother Mary	Hilda		
2027	Cry to Heaven †	Christina	Post-production	
TBA	Untitled Arkasha Stevenson film †		Post-production	

=== Television ===
Shows of Hunter Schafer
Year	Title	Role	Notes	Ref.
2019–2026	Euphoria	Jules Vaughn	24 episodes; also executive producer; co-writer: "Fuck Anyone Who's Not a Sea Blob"	
2025	RuPaul's Drag Race	Herself	Guest judge; episode: "Let's Get Sea Sickening Ball"	
2026	Blade Runner 2099 †	Cora	Miniseries; post-production	

=== Music videos ===
Music videos of Hunter Schafer
Year	Title	Artist	Notes	Ref.
2022	"Hornylovesickmess"	Girl in Red	Director only	
2023	"Why Am I Alive Now?"	Anohni and the Johnsons	Director only	

=== Video games ===
Video games of Hunter Schafer
Year	Title	Role	Notes	Ref.
TBA	OD	TBA	In development since 2022	

== Awards and nominations ==
List of awards and nominations received by Hunter Schafer
Award	Year	Category	Nominated work	Result	Ref.
Dorian Awards	2020	We're Wilde About You! Rising Star of the Year	Euphoria	Nominated	
Fangoria Chainsaw Awards	2025	Best Lead Performance	Cuckoo	Nominated	
Independent Spirit Awards	2025	Best Lead Performance	Cuckoo	Nominated	
MTV Movie & TV Awards	2022	Best Kiss (shared with Dominic Fike)	Euphoria	Nominated	
Queerty Awards	2025	Film Performance	Cuckoo	Nominated	
Shorty Awards	2020	Best Actor	—N/a	Nominated	
