= Kitty Space =

Vietnamese-French drag queen

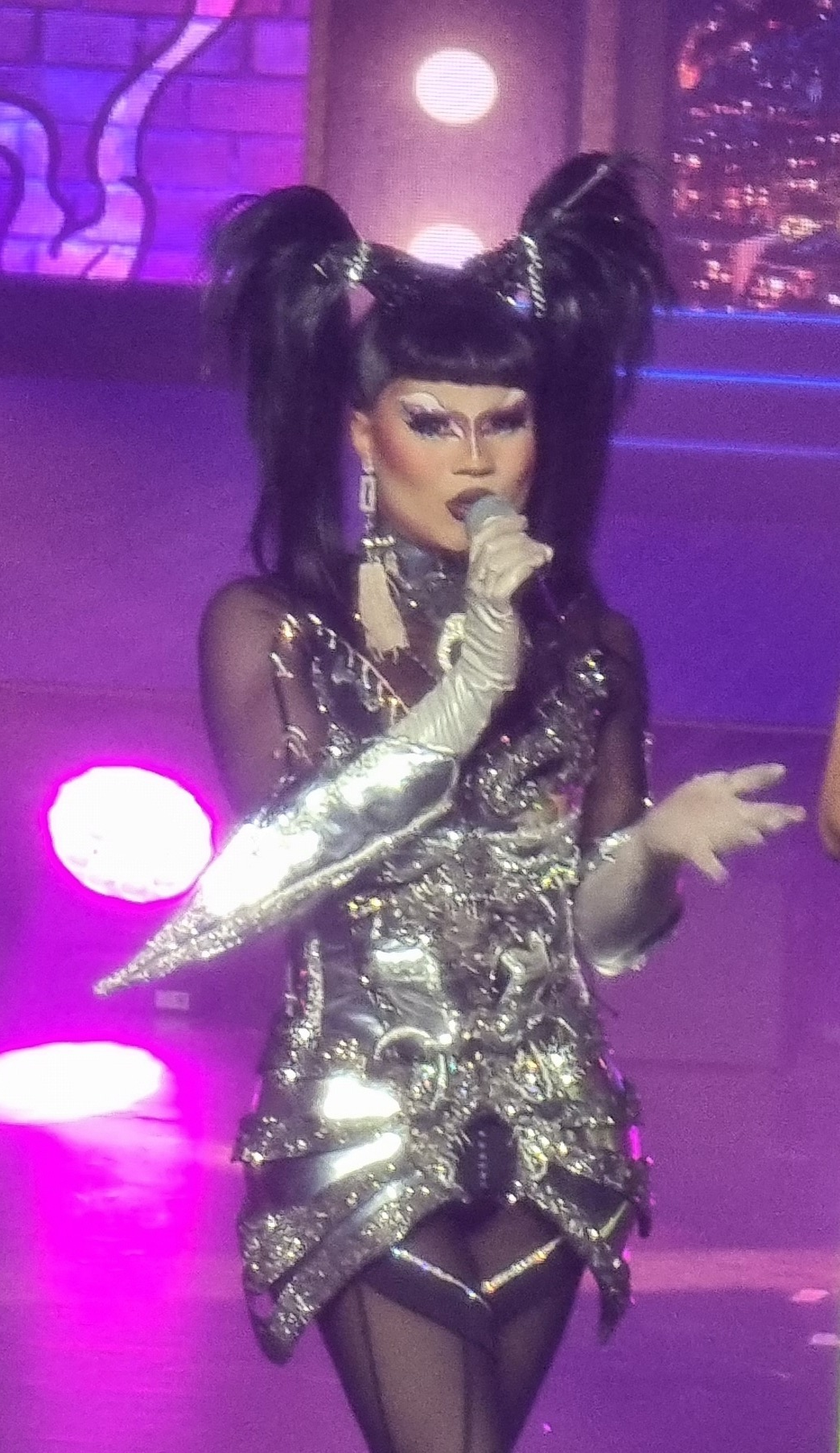
- Kitty Space in 2023
- Other names: Kiara Denis
- Occupation: drag queen
- Known for: Drag Race France

Kitty Space is the stage name of Kiara Denis, a Vietnamese-French drag performer who competed on the second season of Drag Race France and the first season of Drag Race Philippines: Slaysian Royale.

== Career ==
Kitty Space competed on the second season of Drag Race France. She was the first Asian contestant to compete on the show. On the first episode, she placed in the bottom but was spared from elimination after winning the lip-sync contest. She was eliminated on the third episode, placing ninth overall.

== Personal life ==
She is based in Lyon, France. She came out as a trans woman in 2024.

== Filmography ==
- Drag Race France
- Drag Race Philippines: Slaysian Royale

== See also ==
- Transgender representation in the Drag Race franchise
