= Moon (drag queen) =

Swiss drag queen

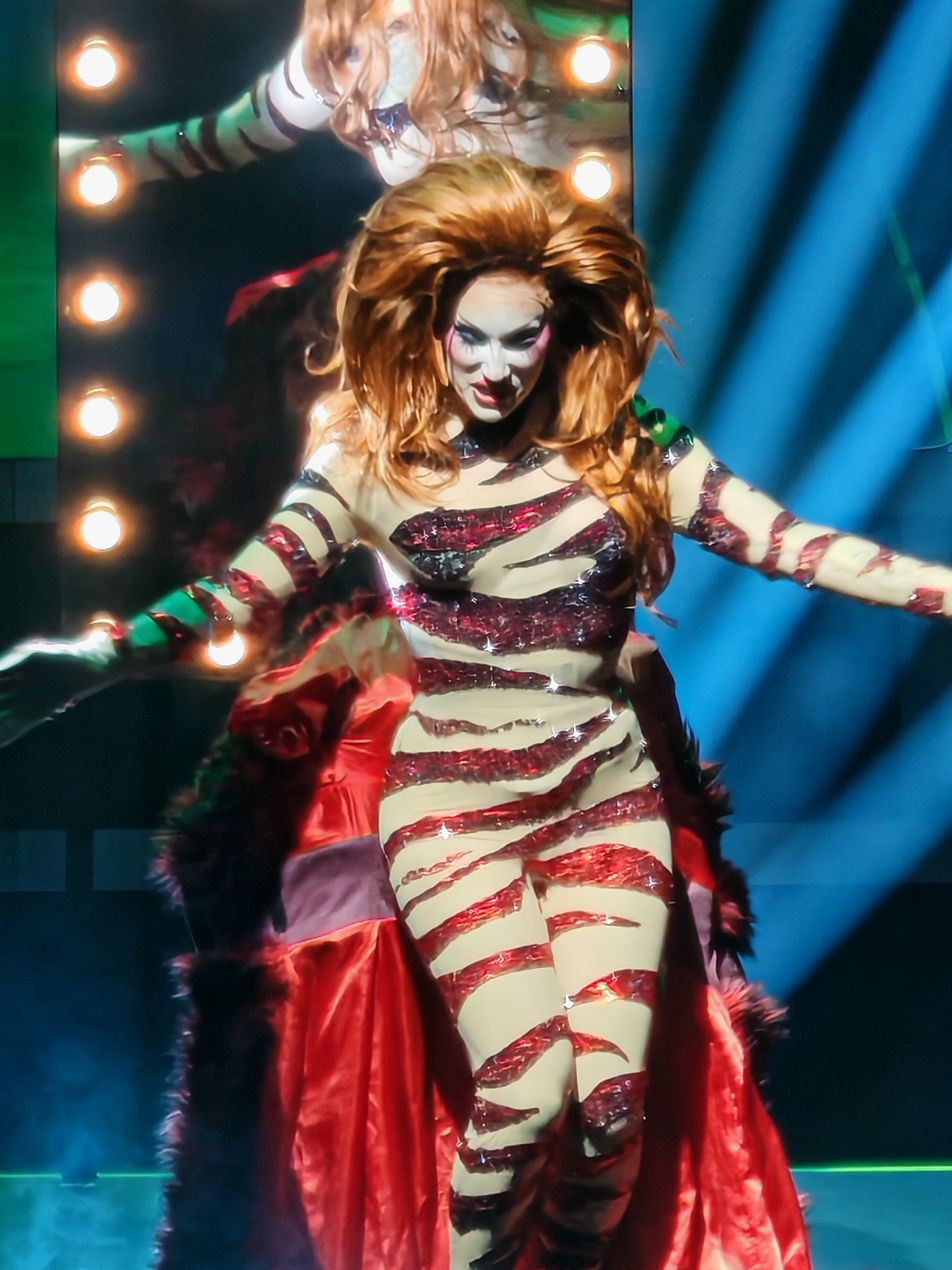
- Moon in 2023
- Born: 1991 (age 34–35); Genève
- Other name: Ava Matthey
- Education: Haute école d'art et de design Genève
- Occupation: Drag queen
- Television: Drag Race France (season 2)

Moon is the stage name of Ava Matthey, a Swiss Romani drag performer born in 1991 in Genève who competed in 2023 on season 2 of Drag Race France and in 2025 on season 1 of Drag Race France All Stars.

== Career ==
Moon is a drag performer. She competed on season 2 of Drag Race France, as the first Swiss contestant of any Drag Race franchise. She had been a drag artist for approximately six years at the time. Moon impersonated Brigitte Fontaine for the Snatch Game challenge. She removed herself from the competition on the sixth episode, and was later named Miss Congeniality by her fellow cast members. This was the franchise's first time a self-eliminated participant was given the title.

== Personal life ==
Moon is a non binary trans woman from Geneva.

== Filmography ==
=== Television ===
- Drag Race France (season 2)
- Bring Back My Girls
- Drag Race France All Stars (2025)
