= Pinnacle Presbyterian Church =

Church in Scottsdale, Arizona

Coordinates: 33.714118°N 111.891998°W

Pinnacle Presbyterian Church is a Presbyterian Church (U.S.A.) congregation of more than 1,200 members located in north Scottsdale, Arizona.

Pinnacle started October 1, 1989, in the Glenn Moor Clubhouse in Troon Country Club with 25 committed, visionary members. After four years, the congregation had grown to 110 members and moved from the over-crowded country club into a chapel built on 25 acres of land purchased by and donated to the church.

On Palm Sunday 1994, founding pastor Dr. Larry Corbett stood outside the chapel and called the people to worship. There were more than 200 people present.

Dr. Corbett brought years of experience with him as the organizing minister, was familiar with the area, and understood what a new church needed to grow. His years at Pinnacle were characterized by commitment, compassion, and passion for the gospel of Christ.

In the fall of 1995, Pinnacle Presbyterian Preschool opened with two teachers and eight students. Associate Pastor for Christian Education, the Rev. Janet Arbesman, developed a church school in the five classrooms. Today, it has more than 26 teachers and staff and 168 students.

The Rev. Dr. Duane Holloran replaced the Rev. Arbesman in 1998. Coming from a clinical psychology background, he developed family life programs and strengthened the adult education program through Bible classes. Lisa Armstrong assumed leadership of the Christian Education of children and youth when the church school children attendance called for full-time leadership.

After Dr. Holloran retired, the congregation asked the Rev. Francis Park to step in as a part-time pastor while the Associate Pastor search continued. In December 2003, the Rev. Mac Schafer received a call to become Associate Pastor. Rev. Schafer and his family came from Lawrenceville, N.J. He was responsible for ministry with families, adult education, and a shared pastoral ministry with the other clergy staff.

Phase two and three of the building program provided a sanctuary that accommodated growth, a memorial garden, much-needed off-street parking, and a fellowship hall. Next in the construction plan came five additional classrooms and an atelier for the preschool and church school, choir facilities, more offices for staff, and a sanctuary that seats 800 worshipers. In 2006, the congregation authorized construction of the next phase including additional church classrooms, a youth building, an addition to the fellowship hall, and additional parking spaces.

Realizing the need to focus on the increasing number of youth in the church, the congregation called the Rev. Kristin Willett as Associate Pastor for Youth and their Families in 2007. She and her husband, Brandon, were recent graduates of Princeton Theological Seminary, N.J.

In August 2007, Dr. Corbett retired from Pinnacle and accepted a call to a church in Honolulu, Hawaii. A search committee of the session appointed Rev. Schafer interim pastor. At the same time, they increased the hours of Rev. Park to help meet the needs of the congregation.

In April 2009, the congregation called Dr. Wesley Avram to be the new Pastor/Head of Staff at Pinnacle after a nearly two-year search. Dr. Avram served Pinnacle until his retirement in January 2024.

In November 2023, the congregation called The Rev. Erik Khoobyarian to serve as the new senior pastor.
