= Tilman Singer =

German filmmaker (born 1988)

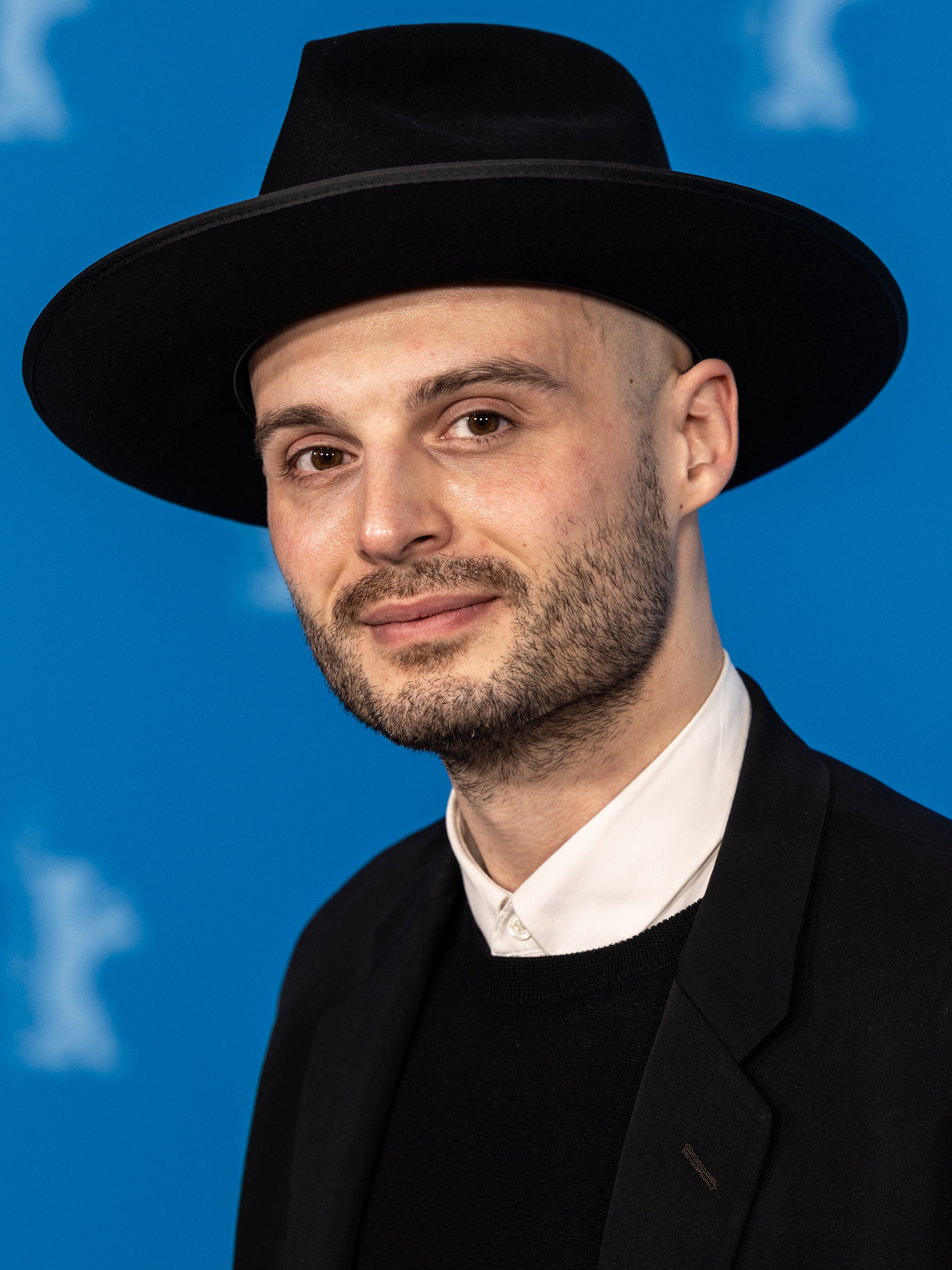
- Singer in 2024
- Born: 1988 (age 37–38); Leipzig, East Germany
- Occupations: Film director, screenwriter

Tilman Singer (born 1988) is a German filmmaker best known for writing and directing the horror films Luz in 2018 and Cuckoo in 2024.

== Career ==
Singer began his career as a commercial director and attended the Academy of Media Arts Cologne. After directing the short films The Events at Mr. Yamamoto's Alpine Residence and El fin del mundo, his senior thesis film, Luz, debuted at the 2018 Berlin International Film Festival. In 2024, his second feature film Cuckoo premiered at the 74th Berlin International Film Festival.

== Filmography ==
Year	Title	Notes	Ref.
2014	The Events at Mr. Yamamoto's Alpine Residence	Short film	
2016	El fin del mundo	Short film	
2018	Luz	—N/a	
2024	Cuckoo	—N/a	

== Awards and nominations ==
Year	Award	Category	Nominated work	Result	Ref.
2018	Fantastic Fest	Best Horror Feature	Luz	Special Mention	
2018	Milan Film Festival	Best Feature Film	Luz	Won	
2018	Buenos Aires International Festival of Independent Cinema	Best Feature Film - Avant Garde and Genre	Luz	Nominated	
2020	Fangoria Chainsaw Awards	Best International Film	Luz	Nominated	
2024	Berlin International Film Festival	Teddy Award	Cuckoo	Nominated	
2024	Brussels International Fantastic Film Festival	Silver Raven Award	Cuckoo	Won	
2024	South by Southwest Film Festival	Narrative Spotlight	Cuckoo	Nominated	
