= List of people from Melbourne =

This is a list of notable people from Melbourne, the capital city of Victoria, Australia.

== Native Melburnians ==
The following were born or grew up in Melbourne.

=== # ===
- 360 – hip-hop rapper

Back to top

=== A ===
- Daevid Allen – musician
- Dennis Allen – criminal
- Gordon Allpress – darts player
- Vanessa Amorosi – entertainer
- Aiva Anagnostiadis – racing driver
- Beau Anderson – darts player
- Phil Anderson – cyclist
- Bobi Andonov – singer
- Peter Andre – entertainer/singer
- Tina Arena – singer/entertainer
- Asphyxia – puppeteer and children's author
- Tilly Aston – rights activist for the blind
- Stephany Avila – actress

Back to top

=== B ===
- James Bailey – darts player
- Merril Bainbridge – local singer
- Mike Baird – bank manager, former NSW premier
- Dougie Baldwin – actor
- Eric Bana – comedian and actor
- Adam Bandt – politician
- Ron Barassi – Australian rules footballer
- Frederick Oswald Barnett – social reformer
- Jeremy Barrett – artist
- Max Barry – writer
- Kevin Bartlett – Australian rules footballer
- Russell Basser (born 1960) – Olympic water polo player
- Monica Bello – basketball player
- Kathleen "Loserfruit" Belsten – Youtuber
- John Bertrand – yachtsman
- Travis Blackley – Major League baseball player
- Hamish Blake – comedian
- Cate Blanchett – actress
- Andrew Bogut – NBA basketball player
- Jonah Bolden (born 1996) – NBA basketball player
- Anne Fraser Bon – pastoralist, philanthropist, and advocate
- Cris Bonacci – musician
- Isobel Borlase – basketball player
- Leigh Bowery – performing artist
- David Boyd – artist
- John Brack – artist
- May Brahe – composer
- Mark Bresciano – soccer player
- Brigita Brezovac – IFBB bodybuilder
- David Bridie – musician
- Damien Broderick – science fiction writer
- Havana Brown – DJ/singer
- Jordan Brown (born 1996) – footballer
- Emily Browning – actress/model
- Leigh Broxham – soccer player
- Stanley Bruce – prime minister of Australia
- Alice Burdeu – fashion model
- Debra Byrne – entertainer

Back to top

=== C ===
- Corey Cadby – darts player
- Ellen Cahill – street singer more commonly known as "Kate Killarney"
- John Cain – premier of Victoria
- Anthony Callea – tenor/entertainer
- Arthur Calwell – politician
- Liz Cambage (born 1991) – basketball player in the Israeli Female Basketball Premier League
- Deirdre Cash (Criena Rohan) – novelist
- Pat Cash – tennis player
- Steph Catley – soccer player for Australia
- Nick Cave – singer/actor
- Brian Chambers – cricketer
- Bianca Chatfield – netball player
- Chris Cheney – musician
- Anna Ciddor – author and illustrator
- Gabriella Cilmi – singer
- Graeme Clark
- Teale Coco – model
- Vince Colosimo – actor
- Kate Constable – novelist
- Julie Corletto – netball player
- Ryan Corr – actor
- Peter Costello – politician, treasurer of Australia
- Frank Costigan – lawyer and politician
- Noel Counihan – artist
- Steve Cox – artist
- Susan Crennan – High Court justice
- Barry Crocker – entertainer, children's TV personality
- Mal Cuming – darts player
- Bernard Curry – actor
- Abraham Cykiert – playwright, poet

Back to top

=== D ===
- Isabella Dalgarno (1805-1878) – Scottish born temperance advocate
- Brody Dalle – singer
- Andrew Dalton – countertenor
- Tenille Dashwood ("Emma") – professional wrestler
- Maude Davey (born 1963) – actress and theatre director
- Garry David – criminal
- Liam Davison – novelist
- Paul Dawber – actor, Neighbours, Sons & Daughters, The Novelist
- Dora de Beer – ethnologist and mountain climber
- Tania de Jong – soprano and entrepreneur (daughter of Eva Duldig, granddaughter of Karl Duldig)
- Emilie de Ravin – actress
- Alfred Deakin – prime minister of Australia
- Paul Dempsey – musician
- Catherine Deveny – comedian
- Anthony Di Pietro – businessman and soccer promoter
- Helena Dix – soprano
- Iris Dixon – cyclist
- Owen Dixon – chief justice
- Jason Donovan – entertainer
- Eva Duldig (born 1938) – tennis player, author
- Karl Duldig (1902–1986) – sculptor
- Sir Edward "Weary" Dunlop – surgeon and war hero
- Judith Durham – entertainer (The Seekers)

Back to top

=== E ===
- Sir John Eccles – Nobel laureate, neurophysiologist
- Peter Eckersley – computer scientist, computer security researcher, and activist
- Matthew Elliott – test cricketer
- Jason Ellis – broadcaster
- Mark Evans – bassist (AC/DC)
- Dante Exum – NBA basketball player

Back to top

=== F ===
- John Farnham – entertainer
- Brendan Fevola – Australian rules footballer
- Jon Finlayson – actor and artist
- John Fitzgerald – tennis player
- Edwin Flack – tennis player
- Flea (born Michael Balzary) – musician (Red Hot Chili Peppers)
- Damien Fleming – test cricketer
- Joel Fletcher – DJ
- Debbie Flintoff-King – Olympic athlete
- Amanda Fosang – biomedical researcher
- Lindsay Fox – logistics CEO
- Malcolm Fraser – prime minister of Australia
- Anna Funder – author

Back to top

=== G ===
- Anna Galvin – actress
- Alphonse Gangitano – organised crime figure
- Zarah Garde-Wilson – attorney
- Helen Garner – novelist
- Andrew Gaze – professional basketball player
- Lisa Gerrard – singer/composer
- Lisa Gervasoni – artist
- Sir John Gorton – prime minister of Australia
- Gotye – musician
- Alan J. Gow – motor sports promoter
- Percy Grainger – composer/pianist
- Germaine Greer – writer and feminist
- Vince Grella – soccer player
- Rachel Griffiths – actress
- Savannah Guthrie – TV broadcaster currently working for NBC News

Back to top

=== H ===
- Joe Hachem – poker player
- Ross Hannaford – musician
- Hanni – member of South Korean girl group NewJeans
- Frank Hardy – novelist and political activist
- Colin Hay – musician/actor
- Chris Hemsworth (born 1983) – actor
- Liam Hemsworth (born 1990) – actor
- Luke Hemsworth (born 1980) – actor
- Paul Hester (d. 2005) – musician
- Missy Higgins – singer, actress and entertainer
- Derryn Hinch ("The Human Headline") – broadcaster
- Peter Hitchener – news presenter
- Harold Holt – prime minister of Australia
- Danielle Horvat – actress
- Rowland S. Howard – musician, writer
- Merv Hughes – test cricketer
- Barry Humphries (Dame Edna Everage) – comedian
- Rex Hunt – Australian rules footballer and media personality

Back to top

=== I ===
- Aubri Ibrag – actress, model, Internet personality
- Kyrie Irving – NBA basketball player
- Steve Irwin – wildlife expert
- Isaac Isaacs – chief justice and governor-general of Australia

Back to top

=== J ===
- Margaret Jackson – business executive
- Christie Jenkins – trampoline athlete
- Paul Jennings – children's author
- Stephen Jolly – activist and politician
- Alan Jones – 1980 Formula One World Drivers' Champion
- Dean Jones – test cricketer
- Vance Joy – singer
- Isha Judd – author and spiritual teacher

Back to top

=== K ===
- Ash Keating – artist
- Moira Kelly – humanitarian aid worker
- Paul Kelly – musician
- Graham Kennedy – entertainer
- Marny Kennedy – actress/singer
- Jeff Kennett – premier of Victoria
- Tori Kewish – darts player
- Jennifer Keyte – news presenter (Seven News)
- Graham Kinniburgh – organized crime figure
- Michael Klim – Olympic swimmer
- Michael Klinger – cricketer
- Barrie Kosky – opera director
- Lynne Kosky – politician
- Anthony Koutoufides – Australian rules footballer

Back to top

=== L ===
- Norman Lacy – politician
- John Landy – Olympic athlete
- Elizabeth Langley – Canadian performer, choreographer, teacher
- Lex Lasry – Supreme Court judge
- Andrew Lauterstein – Olympic swimmer
- Bill Lawry – test cricketer
- Abbey Lee – actress and model
- Andy Lee – comedian
- Michael Leunig – cartoonist and controversialist
- Solomon Lew – businessman
- Sharon Lewin – director of the Peter Doherty Institute for Infection and Immunity
- Simon Lewis – lifeguard
- Peter Lik – photographer
- Walter Lindrum – billiards player
- Lorna Lippmann – anthropologist and campaigner for the rights of Aboriginal Australians
- Luc Longley – NBA basketball player
- Colin Lovitt – lawyer/QC
- Richard Lowenstein – film director
- Craig Lowndes – three time Supercars Championship winner (1996, 1998, 1999)
- Sydney Lucas – centenarian soldier

Back to top

=== M ===
- Stu Mackenzie – musician, King Gizzard and the Lizard Wizard frontman
- Katie Mactier – racing cyclist
- Melissa Maizels (born 1993) – soccer player
- Costas Mandylor – actor
- Daniel Mannix – Catholic archbishop of Melbourne
- Bryony Marks – composer
- John Marsden – writer and educationalist
- Kirstie Marshall – politician and aerial skier
- Mangok Mathiang (born 1992) – Australian-Sudanese basketball player for Hapoel Eilat of the Israeli Basketball Premier League
- John McAll – pianist
- Mat McBriar – American football punter
- Frederick McCubbin – painter
- Scott McDonald – Australian rules footballer
- Hal and Jim McElroy – film/television producers
- Brad McEwan – journalist (Ten Eyewitness News)
- John Reid McGowan – boxer
- Eddie McGuire – entertainer
- Sir William McKie – musician
- Sharelle McMahon – netball player
- Peter McNamara – tennis player
- Paul McNamee – tennis player and sports administrator
- Clement Meadmore – sculptor
- Dame Nellie Melba – opera singer
- Ben Mendelsohn – actor
- Keith Miller – test cricketer
- Dannii Minogue – pop star
- Kylie Minogue – pop star
- Peter Mitchell – news presenter (Seven News)
- Radha Mitchell – actress
- Anika Molesworth – agroecology scientist
- Sir John Monash – civil engineer and military commander
- Jason Moran – criminal
- Lewis Moran – criminal
- Mark Moran – criminal
- Bob Morley – actor
- Leslie Morshead – army officer and businessman
- Dame Elisabeth Murdoch – philanthropist
- Sir Keith Murdoch – journalist
- Rupert Murdoch – press magnate
- Vali Myers – artist and dancer

Back to top

=== N ===
- Andrew Nabbout – soccer player
- Bert Newton – entertainer
- Matthew Newton – actor and son of entertainer Bert Newton
- Olivia Newton-John – singer/actress
- Livinia Nixon – TV presenter (Nine News)
- Keith Nugent – physicist

Back to top

=== O ===
- Dermot O'Brien – film producer and director
- Joan O'Hagan – novelist
- Ida Rentoul Outhwaite – illustrator
- Scott Owen – bassist

Back to top

=== P ===
- Nikos Pantazopoulos – artist
- John James Parton – Big Brother UK contestant
- Sid Patterson – track cyclist
- Guy Pearce – actor
- Andreja Pejic – model
- Kirk Pengilly – musician, member of Australian band INXS
- Elliot Perlman – writer and barrister
- Kath Pettingill – criminal (Pettingill family)
- Mark Philippoussis – tennis player
- Oscar Piastri – McLaren Formula 1 driver
- Harry "Snub" Pollard – comedian
- Bill Ponsford – test cricketer
- Richard Pratt – businessman
- Jane Price (1860–1948) – painter
- Clifton Pugh – artist

Back to top

=== Q ===
- Stephen Quartermain – news presenter, Ten Eyewitness News

Back to top

=== R ===
- Raja Ram – musician
- Diego Ramirez – artist
- Dean Rankine – comic artist and writer
- Chopper Read – criminal
- Helen Reddy – singer and activist
- James Mahmud Rice – sociologist
- Jim Richards – racing driver
- Steven Richards – racing driver
- Robert Richter – lawyer and rights activist
- William Ricketts – potter and sculptor
- Gina Riley – comedian/actress
- Helen Lothan Robertson – tailor and trade unionist (1848–1937)
- Neil Robertson – snooker player
- Anastasia Rodionova – tennis player
- Jodie Rogers – diver
- Rosé – singer, member of South Korean girl group Blackpink
- Lionel Rose – boxer
- Ruby Rose – actress
- Normie Rowe – singer
- Phil Rudd – drummer, member of Australian band AC/DC

Back to top

=== S ===
- Fred Schepisi – film director
- Peter Scully – criminal
- Anna Segal – Olympic freestyle skier and two-time world champion
- Sam Sejavka – writer and musician
- Phineas Selig – journalist
- Mark Seymour – musician
- Patricia Shaw – novelist
- Ann Shoebridge – milliner
- Peter Siddle – test cricketer
- Ben Simmons – NBA basketball player
- Jasmine Curtis-Smith – actress
- Peter Singer – philosopher
- Jerry Skinner – deputy prime minister of New Zealand
- Reuben Solo – comedian
- Daryl Somers – entertainer
- James Sorensen – actor model
- Jesse Spencer – actor, musician
- Caitlin Stasey – actress
- Christine Stephen-Daly – actress
- Russell Stewart – darts player
- Craig Stott – actor
- Graeme "Shirley" Strachan – singer and television presenter, member of Australian rock band Skyhooks
- Dane Swan – Australian rules footballer
- Red Symons – guitarist, entertainer and radio presenter

Back to top

=== T ===
- Peter Tatchell – politician and rights campaigner
- Squizzy Taylor – criminal
- Eliza Taylor-Cotter – actress
- J. G. Thirlwell – singer, composer
- Lewis Thorpe – professional baseball pitcher
- John Thwaites – politician
- George Tolhurst – composer
- Tones and I – singer-songwriter
- Anna Torv – actress
- Geoffrey Tozer – pianist
- Don Tregonning – Australian professional tennis player and coach
- Zbych Trofimiuk – actor
- Zoja Trofimiuk – sculptor
- Anthony Troiano – musician
- Christos Tsiolkas – author
- Albert Tucker – artist

Back to top

=== V ===
- Holly Valance – actress/singer
- Mark Viduka – soccer player
- Steve Vizard – entertainer and businessman

Back to top

=== W ===
- Ron Walker – businessman and lord mayor of Melbourne
- Stan Walker – singer
- James Wan – film producer and director
- Sir Joseph Ward – prime minister of New Zealand
- Shane Warne – test cricketer
- Gordon Watson – squash player
- Kathy Watt – Olympic cyclist
- John Weber – darts player
- Darren Webster – darts player
- Wayne Weening – darts player
- Jessica Weintraub – rhythmic gymnast
- Matt Welsh – world champion swimmer
- Leigh Whannell – actor/screenwriter
- Jamie Whincup – racing driver
- Christian Whitehead – game programmer
- Ted Whitten – Australian rules footballer
- Carl Williams – criminal
- David Williamson – playwright
- Richard Wilson – businessman and sports promoter
- Ross Wilson – singer-songwriter
- Bruce Woodley – entertainer, member of pop group The Seekers
- John Wren – businessman and underworld figure

Back to top

=== X ===
- Bohdan X – singer-songwriter

Back to top

=== Z ===
- Feliks Zemdegs – Rubik's Cube speed solver

Back to top

== Non-native Melburnians ==
These people were not born in Melbourne but are or were well known for living or working there.

=== A ===
Back to top

=== B ===
- Courtney Barnett – singer-songwriter
- Paula Bossio – author and illustrator
- Steve Bracks – premier of Victoria
- Frank Macfarlane Burnet – Nobel laureate virologist

Back to top

=== D ===
- Portia de Rossi – actress
- Peter Doherty – immunologist and Nobel Prize Laureate

Back to top

=== F ===
- Tim Ferguson – comedian

Back to top

=== G ===
- Julia Gillard – prime minister of Australia
- Delta Goodrem – actress/singer

Back to top

=== H ===
- Brent Hobba – professional basketball player

Back to top

=== K ===
- Joshua Katz (born 1997) – Olympic judoka
- Nathan Katz (born 1995) – Olympic judoka
- Alexandra Kiroi-Bogatyreva (born 2002) – Olympic rhythmic gymnast

=== M ===
- Sir Robert Menzies – prime minister of Australia

Back to top

=== N ===
- Sir Gustav Nossal – Australian researcher

Back to top

=== P ===
- Hoa Pham – writer and psychologist

Back to top

=== R ===
- Christopher Raja – writer
- Geoffrey Rush – actor

Back to top

=== S ===
- Guy Sebastian – singer
- Nevil Shute – novelist
- Billy Slater – rugby league player
- John J. Smithies – artist/arts manager
- John So – lord mayor of Melbourne

Back to top

=== T ===
- Archie Thompson – soccer

Back to top

=== W ===
- David Warren – inventor

Back to top

=== Y ===
- James Yammouni – comedian (The Janoskians)

Back to top

== See also ==
- List of people from Adelaide
- List of people from Ballarat
- List of people from Brisbane
- List of people from Darwin
- List of people from Frankston
- List of people from Fremantle
- List of people from Rockhampton
- List of people from Sydney
- List of people from Toowoomba
- List of people from Wagga Wagga
- List of people from Wollongong

Back to top
