= Ish =

Ish or ISH may refer to:

== Arts and entertainment ==
- ...ish (album), a 1989 album by the band 1927
- ...ish (audio drama), a Doctor Who audio drama
- Ish, a book by Peter H. Reynolds
- Ish (film), a 2026 film directed by Imran Perretta

== Businesses and organisations ==
- International School of Havana, Cuba
- International School of Helsinki, Finland
- International School of Hyderabad, India
- International School of The Hague, Netherlands
- International Students House, London, student lodgings
- International Student House of Washington, D.C., student lodgings

== Other uses ==
- Ish (name), a given name, nickname and surname, including a list of people and fictional characters with the name
- In situ hybridization, in molecular biology
- Intrastructural help, in suppressing an immune response gene
- Irish Sport Horse, an Irish breed of horse
- Esan language, ISO 639-3 language code ish
- Ish, the name of a letter in the BFsPA.

== See also ==
- Isha (disambiguation)
- Ishvara, a concept in Hinduism
- Ish al-Shuhah, a village in Syria
- Ish-Blloku, an area of Tirana, Albania
- Nowabad-e Ish, a village in Afghanistan
- Chazon Ish, sobriquet of Rabbi Avraham Yeshayahu Karelitz
