= Chadian cuisine =

Culinary traditions of Chad

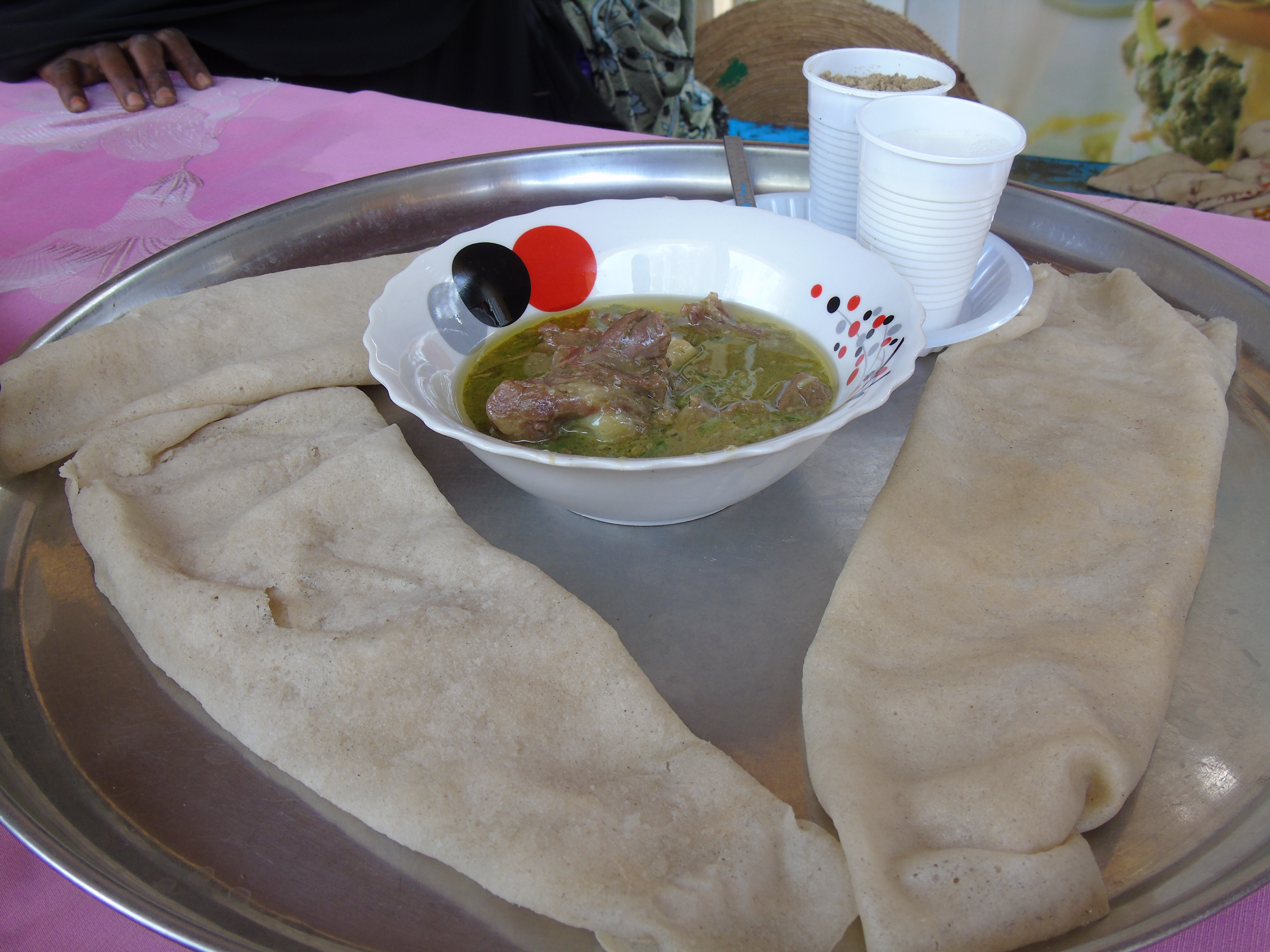
Kisra made with millet and okra sauce

Location of Chad

Chadian cuisine is the cooking traditions, practices, foods and dishes associated with the Republic of Chad. Chadians use a medium variety of grains, vegetables, fruits and meats. Commonly consumed grains include millet, sorghum, and rice as staple foods. Commonly eaten vegetables include okra and cassava. A variety of fruits are also eaten. Meats include mutton, chicken, pork, goat, fish, lamb and beef. The day's main meal is typically consumed in the evening on a large communal plate, with men and women usually eating in separate areas. This meal is typically served on the ground upon a mat, with people sitting and eating around it.

== Northern and southern cuisines ==
Fish is more abundant in southern Chad, including tilapia, perch, eel, carp and catfish. Southern Chadians do not consume many dairy products from livestock, and are not as dependent upon fish as a protein source, but have more options in using fresh produce and spices compared to people in northern Chad. People in Northern Chad include nomadic Arabs and Toubou who rely upon staple foods, including dairy products and meats.

== Foods and dishes ==
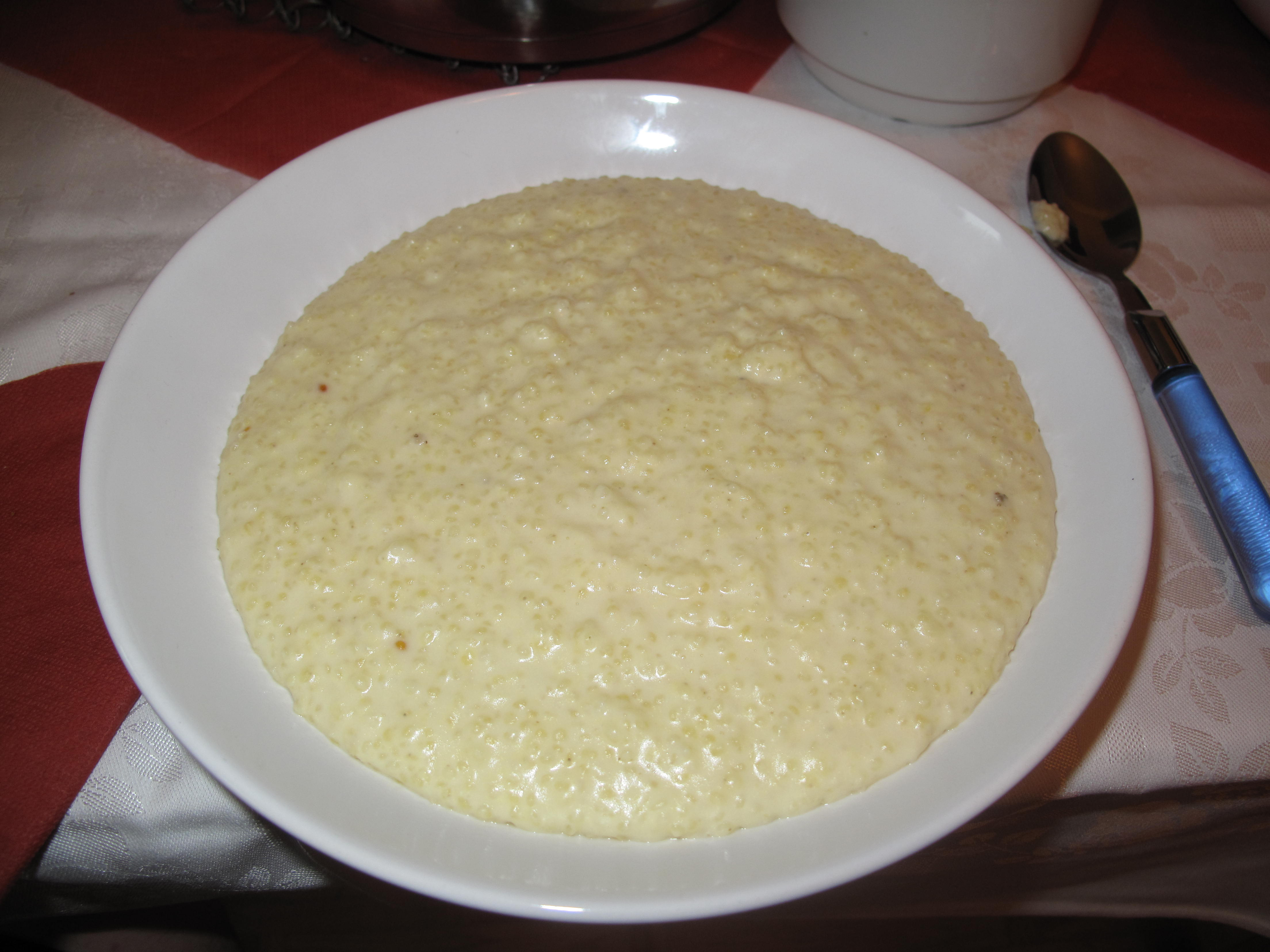
Millet porridge

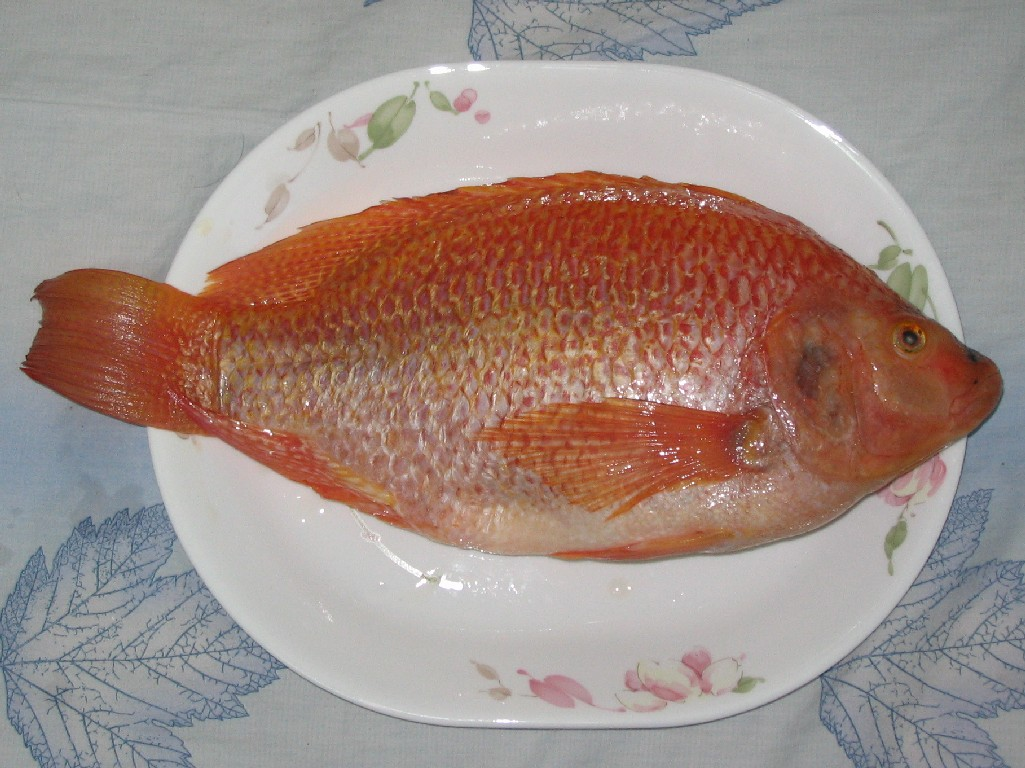
Tilapia

- Bread made from millet and sorghum that has been ground into flour
- Daraba is a traditional dish prepared with okra, tomatoes, sweet potatoes, greens, peanut butter (or peanut paste), and additional ingredient.
- Dried, salted and smoked fish
- Esh is a common dish among northern Arabs that consists of boiled millet flour served with a moulah sauce.
- Fried beef and fish
- Jarret de boeuf is a traditional beef and vegetable stew. It is recommended to stew for at least 2 hours.
- Kisser is a type of sourdough crêpe
- La Bouillie is a traditional breakfast cereal that is served hot. The main ingredients are rice or wheat, milk, peanut butter and flour.
- Millet pancakes and fried balls. Aiyash is a dish eaten by Chadian Arabs in which millet balls are dipped in various sauces.
- Nile perch
- Okra-based gumbo
- Peanut butter
- Porridges made from millet and sorghum are common throughout the country.
- Red beans are part of the diet in Southern Chad.
- Sauces prepared with meat, fish and spices. Sauces are sometimes used to dip various millet and sorghum foods, such as millet bread.

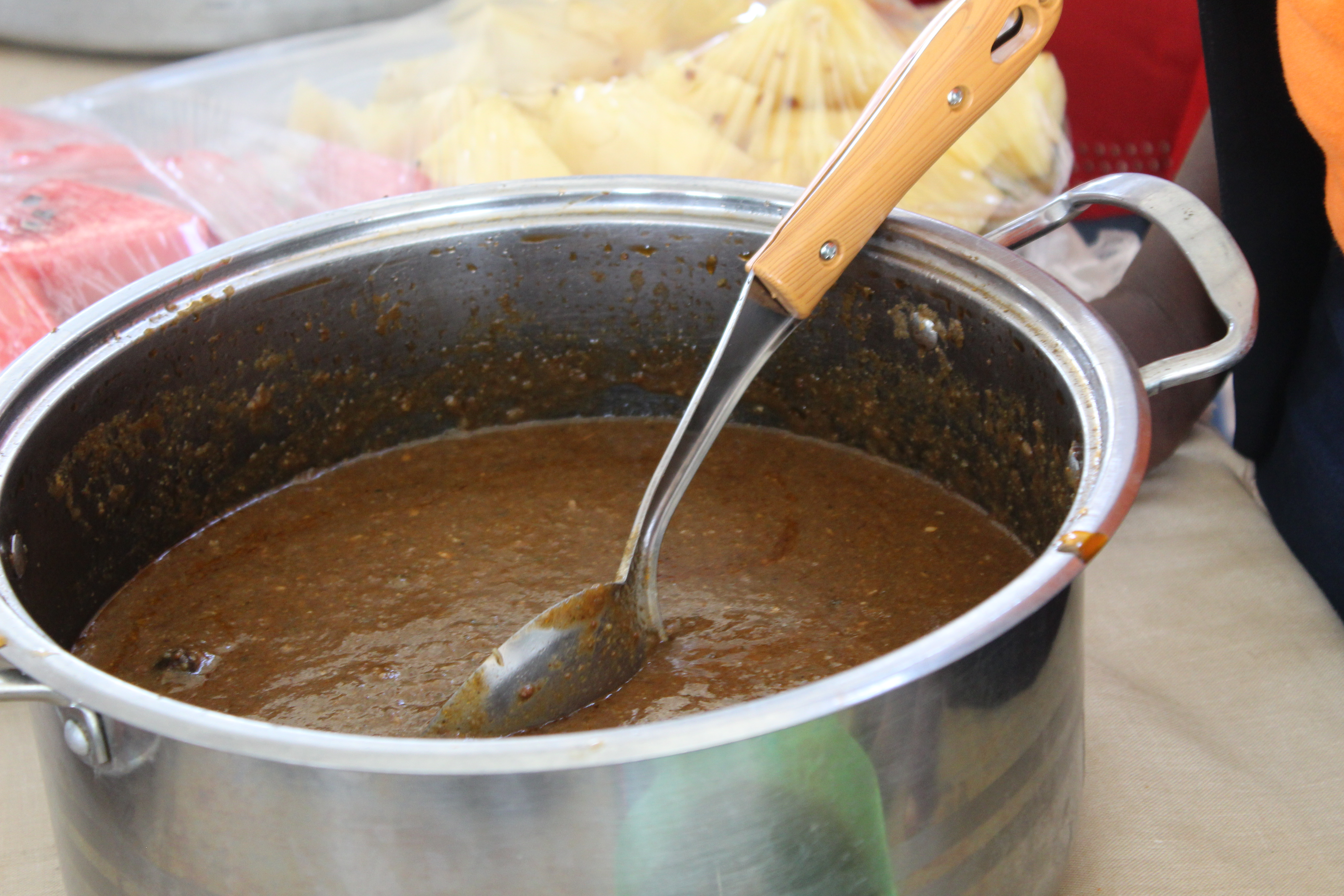
Tagalia, a sauce served in Chad and Sudan

- Sesame seeds and sesame oil are used in many dishes
- Shea butter
- Squash stew with peanuts
- Stews are often prepared with cassava leaves and okra as the primary greens in them.
- Toasted termites and crickets

=== Grains ===
- Millet
- Sorghum
- Rice
- Fonio
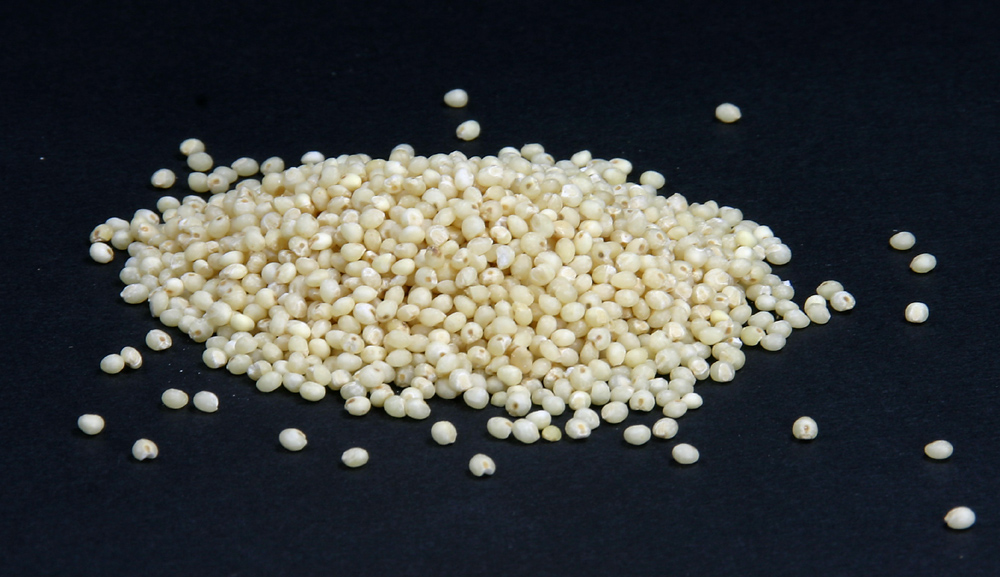
Millet grains

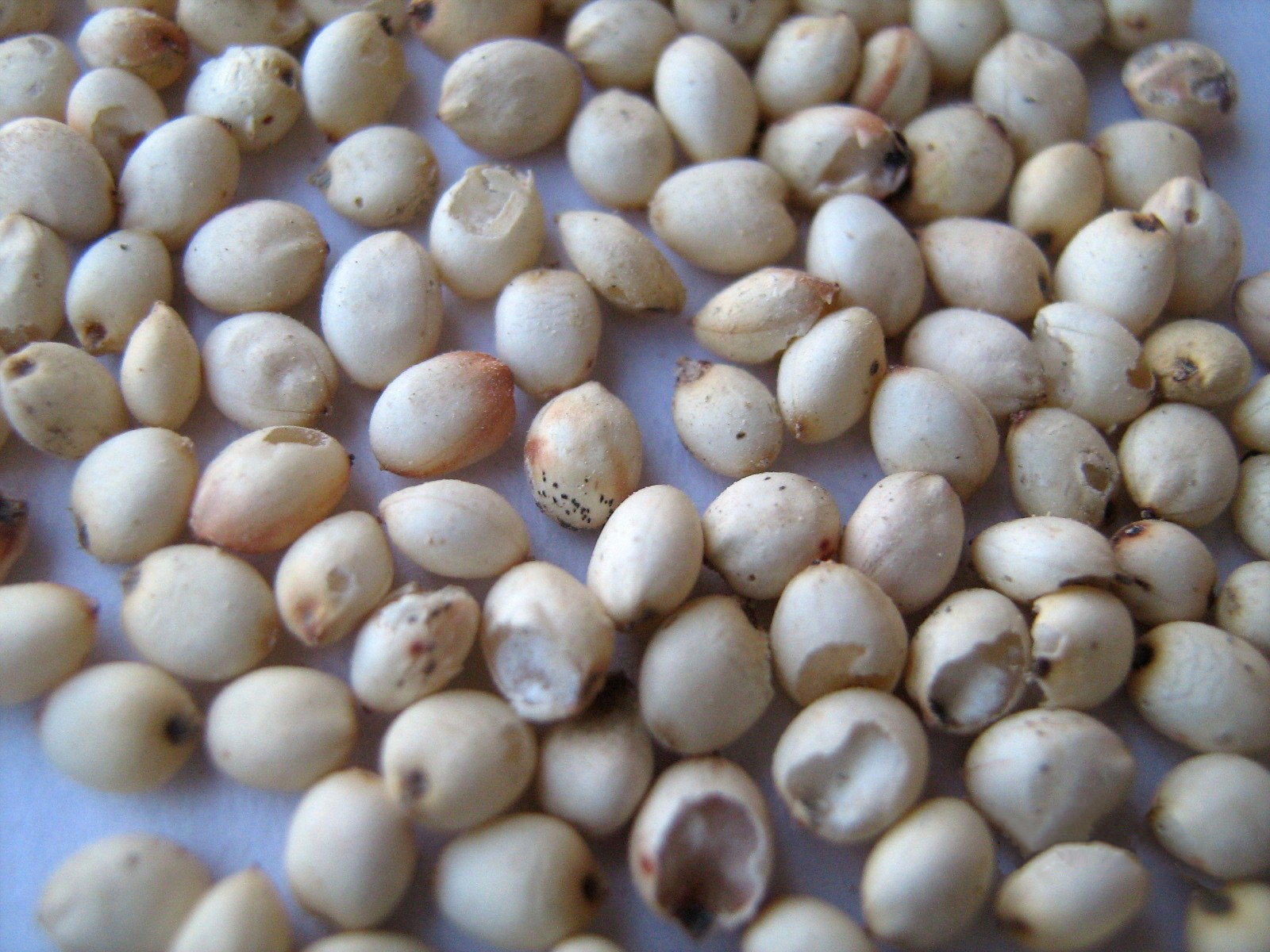
Sorghum grains

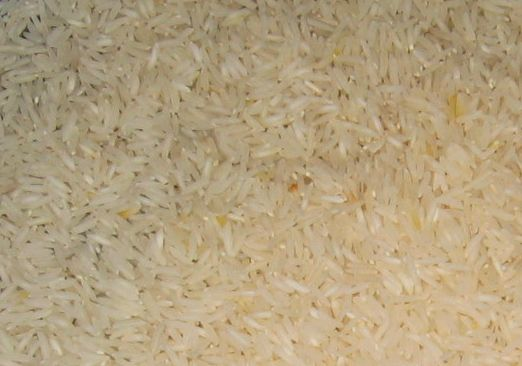
Rice grains

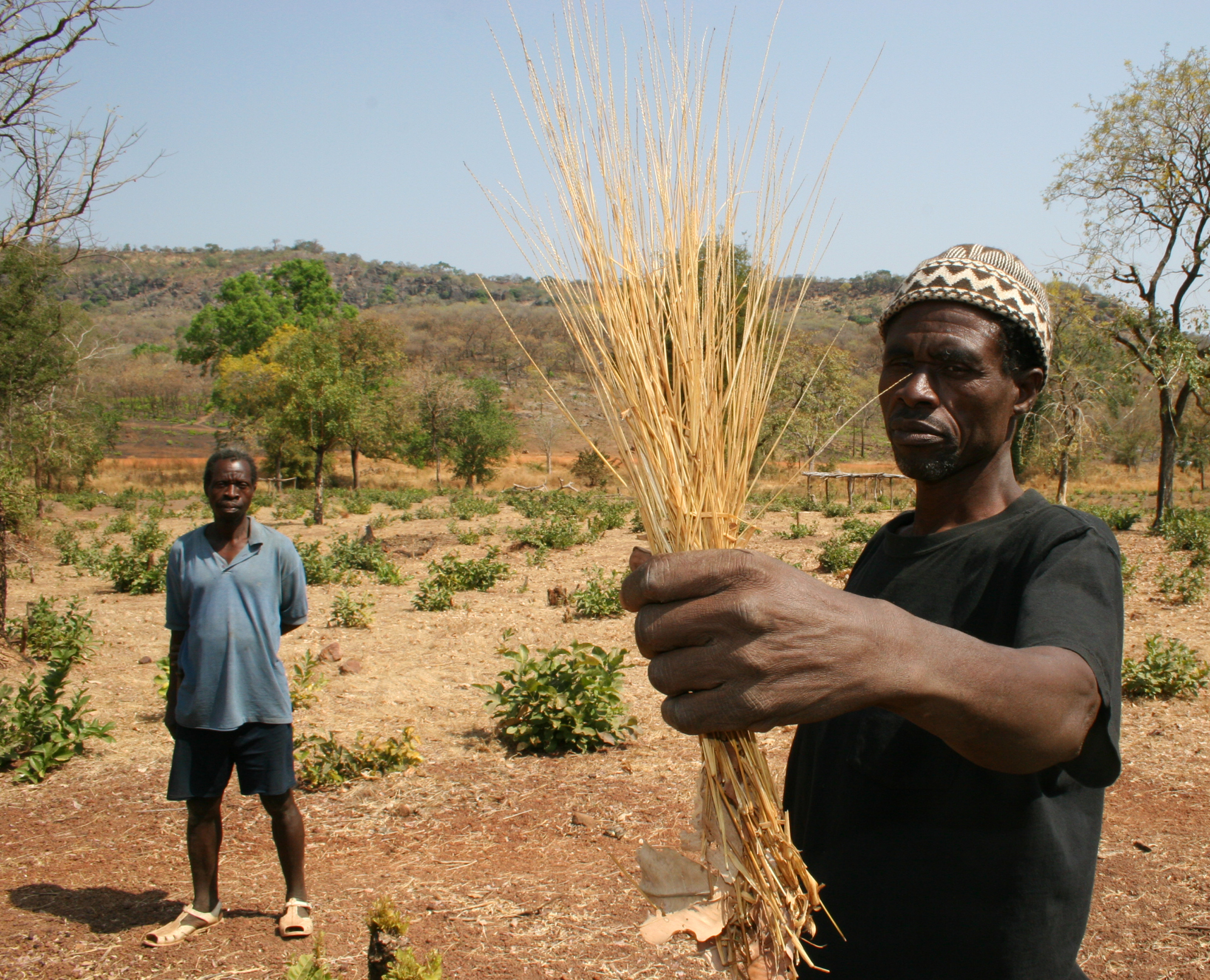
Fonio stems

=== Meats ===
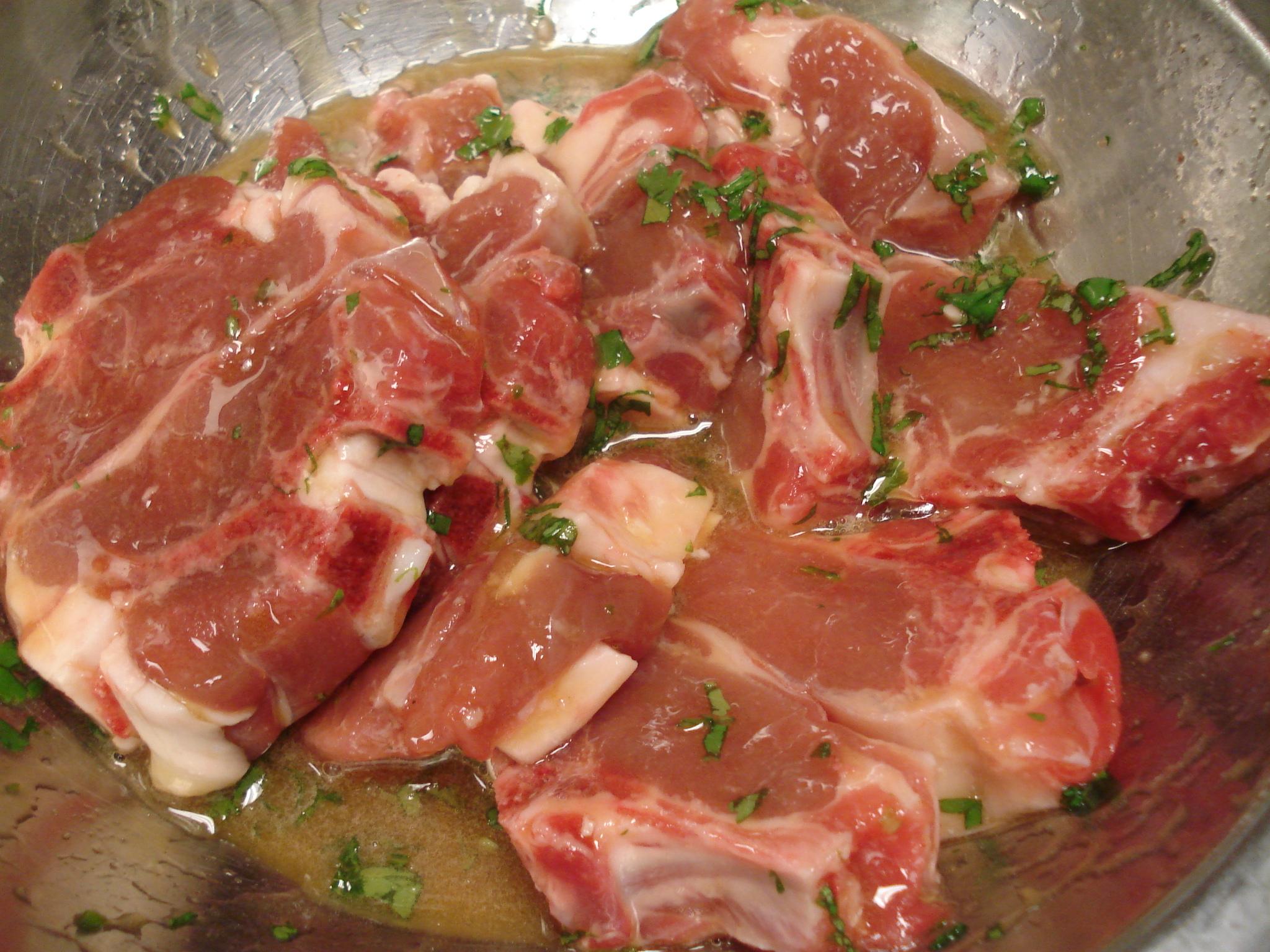
Goat meat

- Beef
- Bushmeat, which is sometimes dried
- Pork
- Chicken
- Fish, particularly in Northern Chad, including tilapia, carp, eel, perch and catfish. Fish is the most common protein source in Chad.
- Goats are the most commonly raised livestock in Chad, and are used for food in the forms of goat meat and goat milk.
- Mutton

=== Fruits and vegetables ===
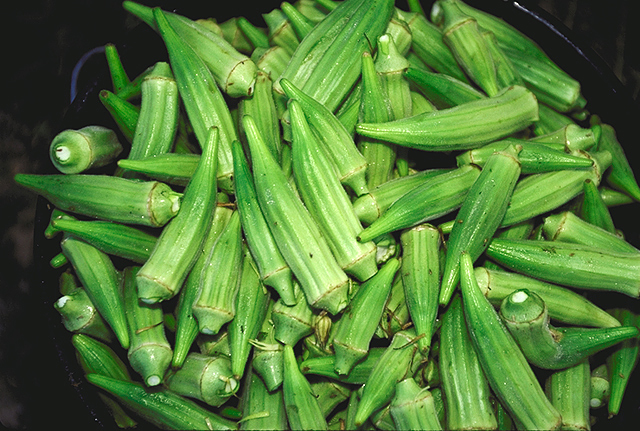
Okra is widely consumed in Chad

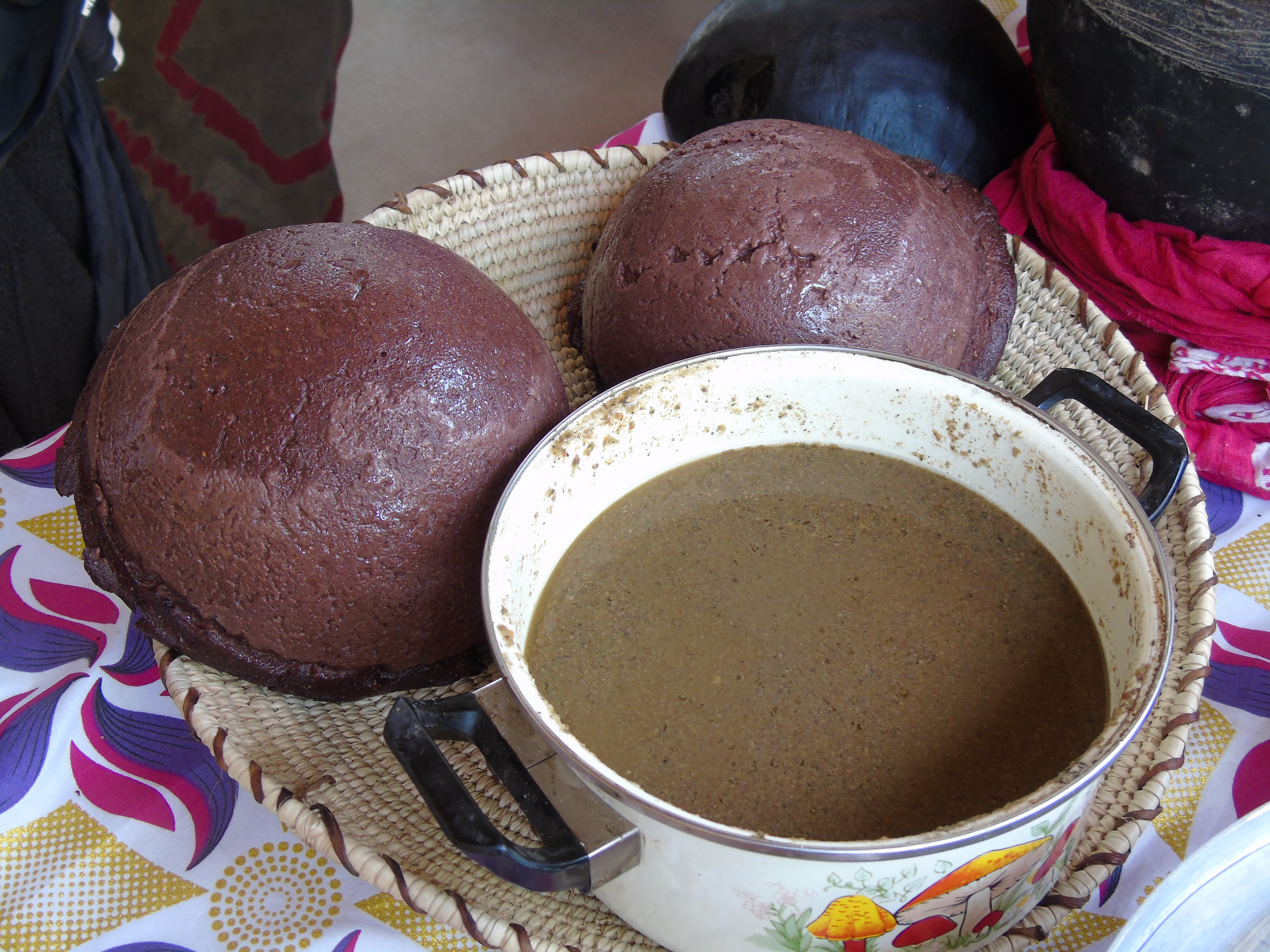
Sorghum balls with dried okra sauce

- Bananas, including plantains *
- Carrots
- Cassava, including cassava leaves
- Chili peppers
- Citrus fruits
- Dates
- Dried pimento
- Garlic
- Green beans
- Guava *
- Legumes, including lentils
- Maize
- Mango *
- Melon *
- Okra
- Onion
- Papaya *
- Peanuts
- Pineapple *
- Potato
- Raisins
- Zucchini

* Particularly common in Southern Chad

== Beverages ==
Tea is the most commonly consumed beverage in Chad. Red, black and green teas are consumed in Chadian cuisine. Karkanji/carcaje is a red tea made from dried hibiscus flowers with ginger, clove, cinnamon and sugar added to taste. It is very common in Chad. Liquor and millet beer are consumed by non-Muslim Chadians in Southern regions of the country. Millet beer is known as bili-bili.

Additional beverages in Chadian cuisine include:

- Fruit juices
- Gala is a beer brewed in Chad
- Jus de fruit is a traditional beverage prepared with mango, milk, sugar and cardamom powder.
- Milk
- Soft drinks

== International representation ==
Chadian cuisine has made its way into the international culinary scene. The globalization of food, travel, and the Chadian diaspora have all contributed to the spread of Chadian cuisine outside of Chad. In cities with significant African communities, such as Paris, London, and New York, Chadian dishes can sometimes be found in African restaurants or at cultural events.

Some popular Chadian dishes that have gained recognition abroad include:

- Daraba: A vegetarian stew made from okra, tomatoes, and peanut butter, often served with rice or a type of porridge called "boule."
- Dried fish: A common ingredient in Chadian cuisine, dried fish is often used to add flavor to various stews and soups.
- Grilled meats: Grilled meats, such as goat or chicken, are a popular food in Chad, and can be found at roadside stalls and restaurants.
- Boule: A thick porridge made from grains like millet, sorghum, or maize, often served with a sauce or stew.
- La Bouillie: A sweet porridge made from rice or millet flour, sugar, and water, often flavored with ingredients like peanuts, coconut, or tamarind.

== See also ==
- African cuisine
- List of African cuisines
