= La Bouillie =

La Bouillie may refer to:

== Food ==
- La bouillie (Chadian food)
- Tarte à la Bouillie

== Places ==
- La Bouillie, Côtes-d'Armor, a commune in the Côtes-d'Armor department of Brittany in northwestern France
- La Bouille, a commune in the Seine-Maritime department in the Normandy region in north-western France
