= Tagalia =

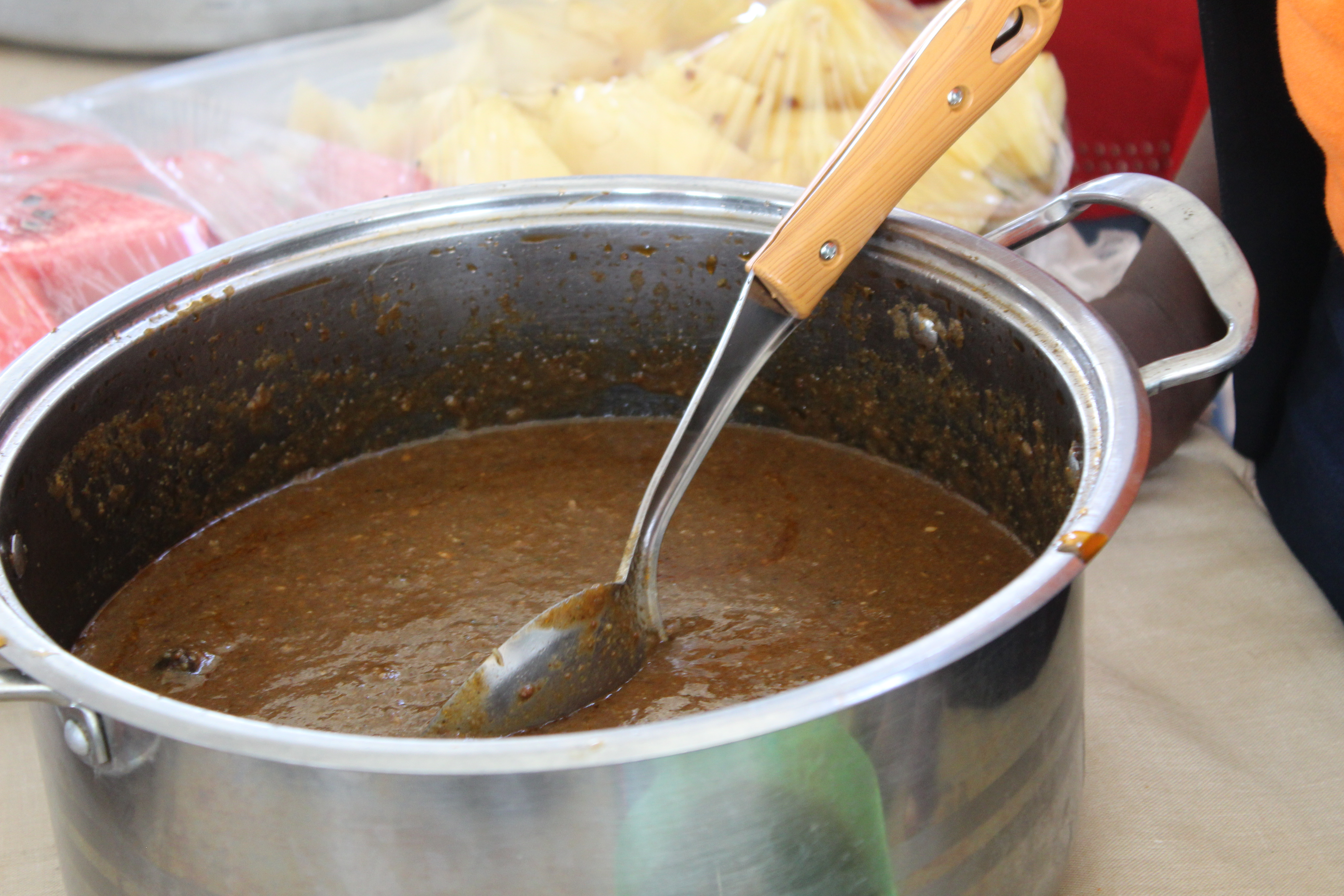
- Tagalia in a pot
- Alternative names: Mullah tagalia
- Type: Sauce
- Place of origin: Chad, Sudan
- Associated cuisine: Chadian cuisine, Sudanese cuisine
- Main ingredients: Onion, tomato paste, minced beef, oil, spices

Tagalia, also called mullah tagalia or red stew, is a Sudanese and Chadian sauce popular during Ramadan. It is mainly made from onions, minced beef, tomato paste, oil, and spices such as coriander and red pepper. The spices contribute to the sauce's red color. It is cooked until thickened and the oil comes up to the surface. It is served with bread, kisra (a type of flatbread), gurasa (a heavy Sudanese flatbread), or a dumpling (aseeda/asida) made of wheat, corn, or rice flour.
