= Esha =

Esha may refer to:

== People ==
- Esha Dadawala, Indian poet and journalist in Gujarati
- Esha Deol, Indian actress
- Esha Gupta, Indian actress
- Esha Kansara, Indian actress
- Esha Momeni, Iranian-American scholar and women's rights activist
- Esha Oza, Indian cricketer
- Eisha Singh (born 1998), Indian actress
- Esha Sethi Thirani, Indian fashion designer
- Esha Yousuff, Bangladeshi film producer
- ill-esha, Canadian electronic music artist

== Places ==
- Esha Ness (also spelled Eshaness), a peninsula in Shetland, Scotland

== See also ==
- Eesha
- ESA (disambiguation)
- Esh (disambiguation)
- Isha (disambiguation)
