= Ishita =

Ishita is an Indian female given name and may refer to:

- Ishitta Arun, Indian actress, model and writer
- Ishita Chauhan (born 1999), Indian model and film actress
- Ishita Dutta (born 1990), Indian model and actress
- Ishita Ganguly (born 1992), Indian television actress
- Ishita Malaviya, Indian surfer
- Ishita Moitra (born 1983), Indian screenwriter
- Ishita Panchal (born 1998), Indian film and television child actress
- Ishita Raj (born 1995), Indian film actress
- Ishita Roy, Indian politician
- Ishita Sharma (born 1990), Indian actress and dancer
- Ishita Vyas (born 1990, as Manju Vyas), Indian television and film actress

== See also ==
- Isha (disambiguation)
- Eshita Syed, Pakistani model and actress
- Rumana Rashid Ishita, Bangladeshi actress
