= ESHS =

ESHS may refer to:

- ES Hammam-Sousse, a Tunisian football club

== Schools ==
- El Segundo High School, El Segundo, California, United States
- Elmore Stoutt High School, Tortola, British Virgin Islands
- Emma Sansom High School, Gadsden, Alabama, United States
- Esperance Senior High School, Esperance, Western Australia, Australia

== See also ==
- Esh (disambiguation)
