= Eesha =

Eesha is an Indian name. Notable people with the name include:

- Eesha Karavade (born 1987), Indian chess player
- Eesha Rebba (born 1990), Indian actress
- Eesha Khare (born 1995), American inventor

You may also be looking for:

- Eesha (film), a 2025 Indian film

== See also ==
- Esha (disambiguation)
- Isha (disambiguation)
