= Ish (name) =

Ish is a given name, nickname and surname. People with the name include:

== Given name ==
- Ish Amitoj Kaur (fl. from 2015), filmmaker

== Nickname ==
- Ishmael Butler (born 1969), or Ish, American rapper
- Ish Kabibble, stage name of Merwyn Bogue (1908–1994), American comedian and cornet player
- Ish Ledesma (Ismael Angel Ledesma, born 1952), American singer, songwriter, musician, and producer
- Ishan Morris, stage names iSH, or Ish Morris, Canadian singer and actor
- Ish Polvorosa (Esmilzo Joner Polvorosa, born 1997), Filipino volleyball player
- Ish Smith (Ishmael Larry Smith, born 1988), American basketball player
- Ish Sodhi (Inderbir Singh Sodhi, born 1992), New Zealand cricketer
- Ish Wainright (Ishmail Carzell Wainright, born 1994), American-Ugandan basketball player for Hapoel Tel Aviv of the Israeli Basketball Premier League

== Surname ==
- Kathryn Ish (1936–2007), American theater, film, television and voiceover actress
- Ronnie Ish, member of the band As It Is

== Fictional characters ==
- Ish, a characters of The Last of Us

== See also ==
- Ish-Shalom (disambiguation), a surname
- Nachum Ish Gamzu, 1st century rabbi
- David Ish-Horowicz (born 1948), British scientist
- Yoram Ish-Hurwitz (born 1968), Dutch pianist
- Judith Ish-Kishor (1892–1971), American writer
- Sulamith Ish-Kishor (1896–1977), American writer
