= Kamounia =

Beef and liver stew prepared with cumin

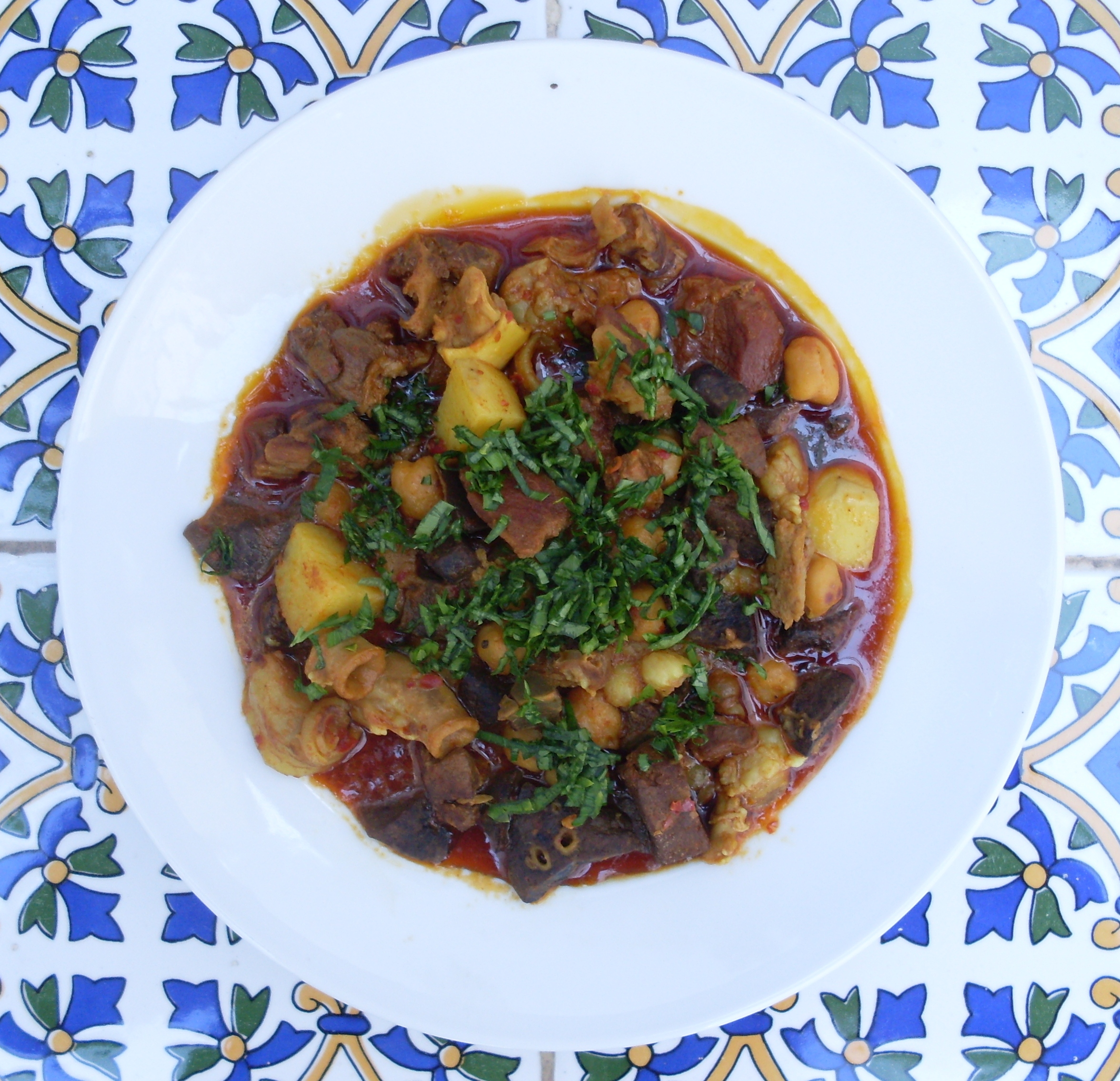
- Kamounia

Kamounia (Arabic: كمونية), sometimes spelled kamouneya, is a beef and liver stew prepared with cumin. It is a part of Sudanese, Egyptian, Algerian, Libyan and Tunisian cuisines. Lamb is also sometimes used as a primary ingredient, and additional spices are sometimes used. It is sometimes served with or atop cooked rice. Additional basic ingredients can include broth, garlic, olive oil and parsley.

== See also ==
- List of African dishes
- List of stews
- Maghreb cuisine
