= ESA (disambiguation) =

ESA most commonly refers to the European Space Agency.

ESA or Esa may also refer to:

== Places ==
- El Salvador, IOC country code
- Èze (French pronunciation: [ɛːz], Italian: Eza, Occitan: Esa), a commune in France

== People ==
- Esa (name), list of people with the name

== Arts, entertainment, and media ==
- Esa, daughter of Etain, a character from Irish legend mentioned in the Banshenchas
- Environmental Station Alpha, a video game

== Economics and finance ==
- Coverdell Education Savings Account, an American investment account
- Economic Stabilization Agency, of the Government of the United States; defunct
- Economics and Statistics Administration, an agency within the United States Department of Commerce
- Employment and Support Allowance, a British Government state benefit
- Employment Standards Act, of the Parliament of Canada
- European Free Trade Association Surveillance Authority
- European Supervisory Authority in the European System of Financial Supervision
- European System of Accounts

== Education ==
- Education Savings Account, a U.S. designated account to encourage savings to cover future education expenses
- École Sainte-Anne, a French public middle/high school in Fredericton, New Brunswick, Canada
- École supérieure des affaires (Beirut), a Lebanese business school
- École Supérieure des Affaires (Lille), a French business school
- Episcopal School of Acadiana, in Cade, Louisiana, United States
- Etobicoke School of the Arts, in Toronto, Ontario, Canada
- European Security Academy, in Wroclaw, Poland

== Professional associations ==
- Ecological Society of America
- Entertainment Software Association, an American trade association
- Entomological Society of America
- Environmental Services Association, a British professional association
- European Seed Association
- European Sociological Association

== Sport ==
- Eastern Sports Association, a defunct Canadian wrestling promotion
- Eight Schools Association, an American athletic league
- English Shinty Association
- Raleigh Entertainment and Sports Arena, now PNC Arena, in North Carolina, United States

== Technology ==
- Electronically scanned array
- Electrostatic analyzer
- Emergency Stand Alone, a mode of distributed switching in telecommunications
- End of Selected Area, a C1 control code
- Enthusiast System Architecture, a computer bus protocol
- Equivalent Standard Axles, a mathematical factor used in the design of road pavements based on the weight of trucks and how many axles a truck has
- Erythropoiesis-stimulating agent
- Explicit semantic analysis
- IBM Enterprise Systems Architecture, a mainframe instruction set architecture
- Sonex Electric Sport Aircraft, an electric aircraft
- Enhanced suffix arrays; a variant of suffix array
- Euratom Supply Agency, ensures a supply of nuclear fuels to EU users

== Other uses ==
- 9950 ESA, an asteroid
- Australian Capital Territory Emergency Services Agency
- East Side Access, a public works project in New York City
- Eastern sigillata A, a type of ancient east Mediterranean pottery
- Emotional support animal
- Endangered Species Act of 1973, of the United States Congress
- Environmental site assessment, for American real estate companies
- Environmental systems analysis, a methodology
- Epsilon Sigma Alpha, an American collegiate and service organization
- European Speedrunner Assembly, a video gaming event
- European Symposium on Algorithms, a computer science conference
- Greek Military Police
- Secret Anti-Communist Army (Spanish: Ejército Secreto Anticomunista), active in the Guatemalan Civil War

== See also ==
- Esha (disambiguation)
- Isa (disambiguation)
