= Sudanese cuisine =

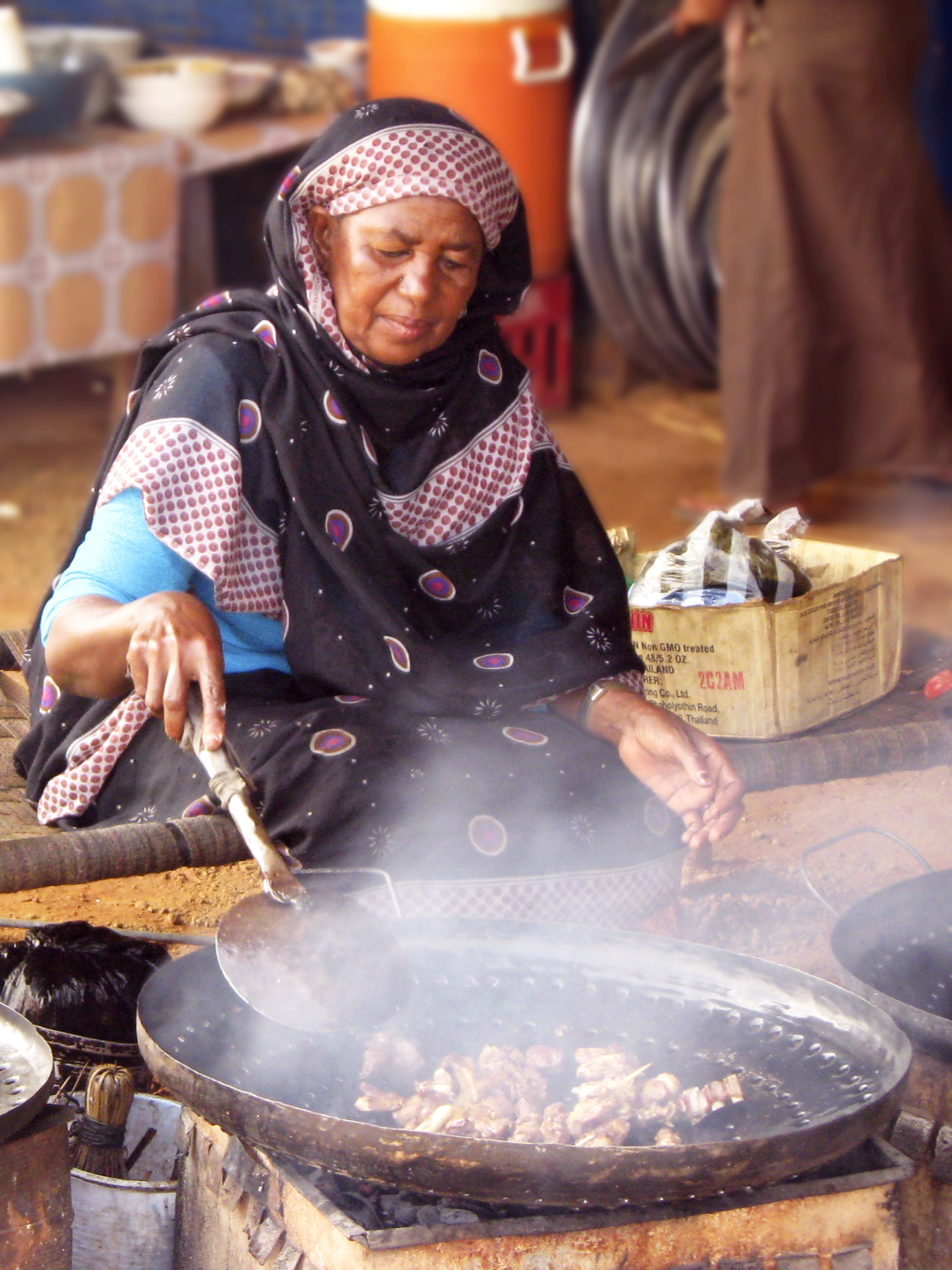
A woman cooking in Sudan

Sudanese cuisine is greatly affected by the historical cross-cultural influences of Arab, Nubian, Egyptian, Turkish, Greek, and Levantine cuisine in Sudan. Many Sudanese foods have been around for thousands of years. The most common meats eaten are lamb and beef, in accordance with the Islamic halal laws. Most meals are communal and often shared with family, neighbors, and guests, as part of Sudanese hospitality.

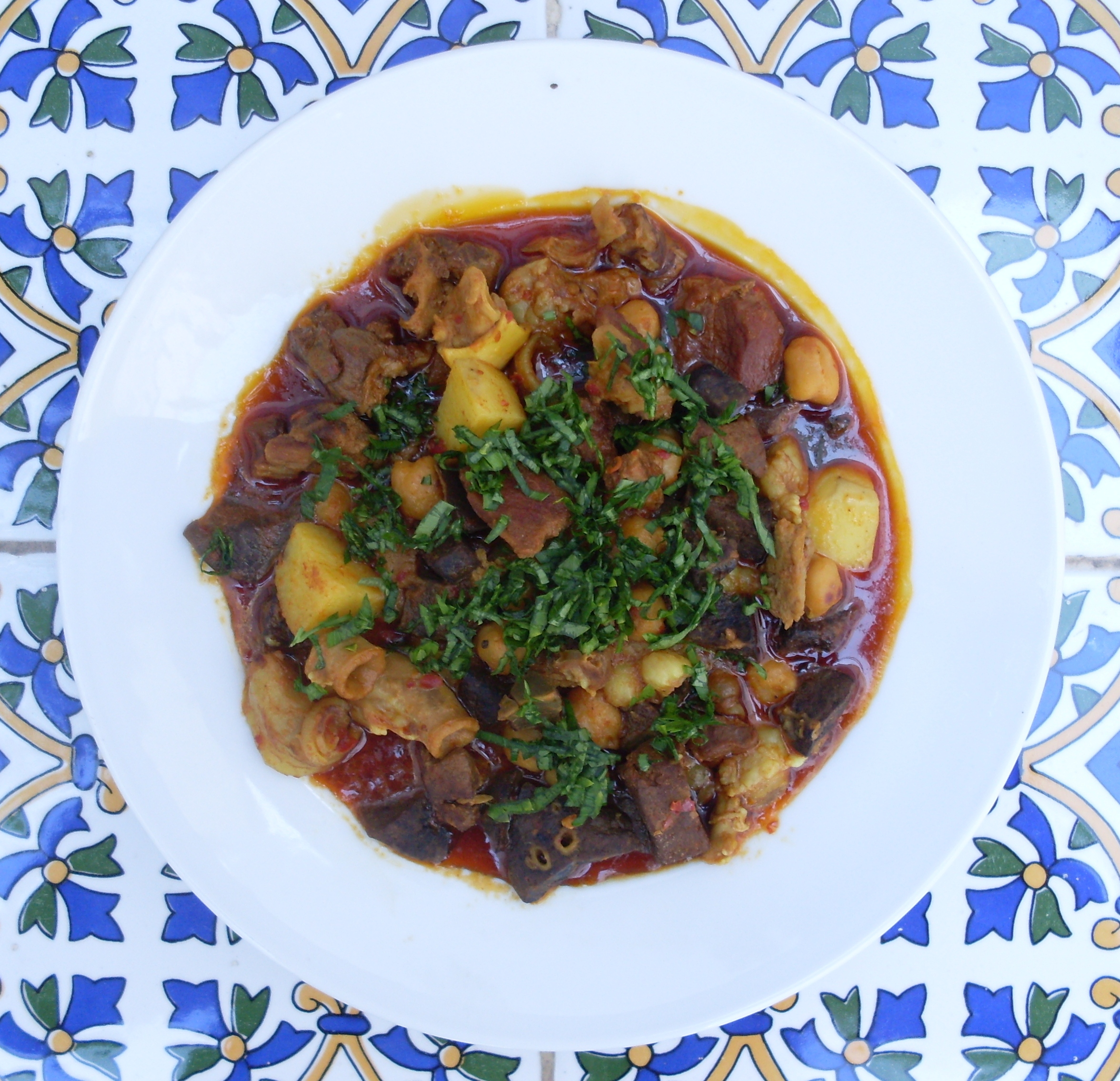

Breads such as baladi or aish baladi, a popular pita bread and gorrassa—a pancake-like bread similar to a crêpe—are eaten with savory stews (mullah), cheese (jibna), fava beans, and falafel (tamiya). There is also kisra, fermented bread similar to Ethiopian injera, but thinner and smaller. Khubz Francesa or Sudanese style French bread.

== Influences ==
Egyptian cuisine has greatly influenced Sudanese cuisine. Both share dishes such as falafel (tamiya), which is made with chickpeas in Sudan instead of fava beans as in Egypt; ful medames, a widely eaten dish in both Sudan and Egypt; molokhia, a thick soup made from boiled leaves; kamounia, a meat liver stew eaten in Sudan, Egypt and Tunisia; and desserts such as umm ali and basbousa. Jibna bayda, a soft white cheese, is also eaten.

Turkish cuisine has also influenced Sudanese cuisine. Turkish foods found in Sudanese cuisine include kebabs, kofta, and shawarma, as well as sweets such as baklava. Levantine and Egyptian sweets also entered Sudanese cuisine and are known as oriental (or Levantine) sweets.

== Appetizers ==
Meals include elmaraara and umfitit, which are dishes made from sheep's offal (including the lungs, liver, and stomach), onions, peanut butter, and salt. They are eaten raw. A peanut butter salad called salatat dakwa is also eaten. Another well-known Sudanese salad is salata aswad, occasionally known as salata aswad bi zabadi, a dish of grilled aubergine mixed with peanut butter, chillies and other spices that gives salata aswad a distinctive appearance. Reminiscent of baba ghanoush, it relies on peanut butter or mashed peanuts instead of tahini as a main sauce.

== Soups and stews ==
A popular Sudanese mullah (savory stew) is mullah ahmar, a red mincemeat sauce that is eaten with asida, a dish consisting of boiled wheat flour molded into a ball. Asida is eaten across North Africa. Other mullahs will sometimes use waika, special sauce made from crushed okra and niaimiya, a spice mix that gives some mullahs a sticky yet flavorful texture. Dried waika is sometimes used as a seasoning in the mullah. Most Sudanese mullahs will have either meat or other vegetables or legumes. Sometimes seasoned meats are used such as in mullah sharmout—made of dried meats, onions and dried okra (crushed waika)—is added to most types of mullah. In rural Western Sudan, namely Darfur and Kordofan, fermented foods like kawal serve as substitutes for meat in mullahs. Powdered kawal is also used as a condiment similar to black pepper in urban Sudan.

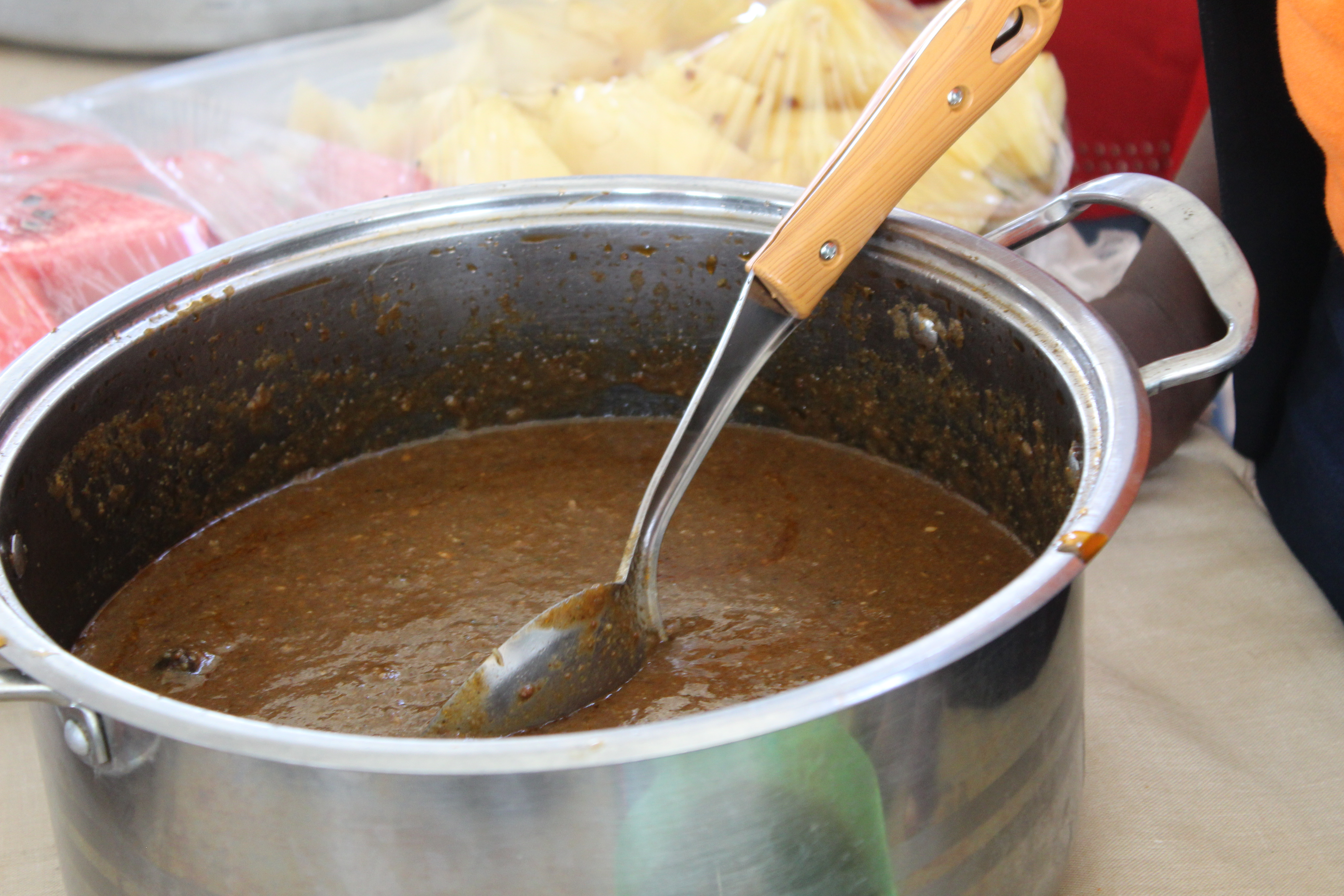
Mullah tagalia (red stew)

Several stews, including waika, bussaara, and sabaroag, use ni'aimiya (a Sudanese spice mix) and dried okra. Miris is a stew made from sheep's fat, onions, and dried okra. Abiyad is made from dried meat, while kajaik is made from dried fish. In Equatoria (now in South Sudan), soups include kawari, made from cattle or sheep hooves with vegetables, and elmussalammiya, made from liver, flour, dates, and spices.

== Beverages ==
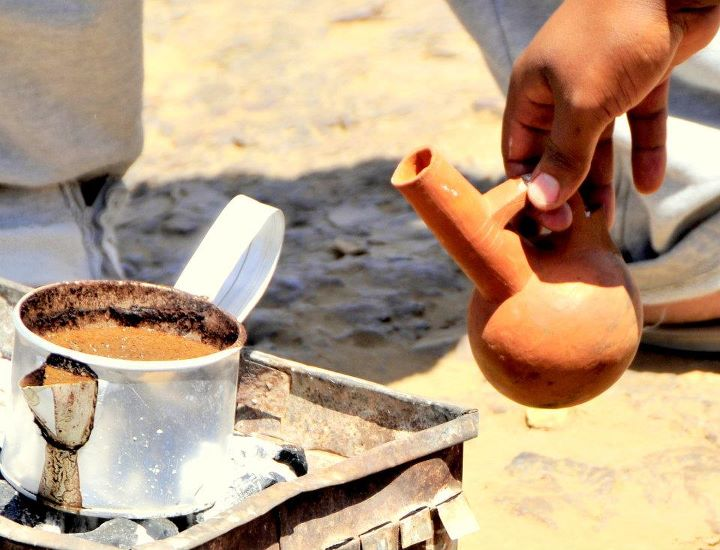
Sudanese jabana coffee pot

The most popular drink is tap or bottled water, traditionally offered free of charge for anyone in large clay pots in the streets. Strong coffee, sometimes served in Sudanese coffee pots called jabana, and black tea, often with milk, are also popular. These are sold in the streets by "tea ladies". Especially on hot days, traditional cold hibiscus tea, called karkadeh, is made in homes.

=== Alcoholic beverages ===
Historically, Sudan was one of the few predominantly Muslim countries that allowed traditional and Western alcoholic drinks. Men drank millet wine, sharbot (an alcoholic drink from fermented dates), and araqi. In the 20th century, some Sudanese were influenced by Europeans and began drinking whiskey and beer.

In September 1983, former Sudanese President Gaafar Nimeiry enacted sharia, marking the occasion by dumping alcohol into the Nile river. Since then, the purveying, consumption, and purchasing of alcohol has been banned in Sudan. Being lashed 40 times is the penalty for breaking the prohibition on alcohol. Nevertheless, araqi, an alcoholic gin made from dates, continued to be illegally brewed in defiance of sharia. In 2019, the Transitional Government passed a new law, allowing alcoholic beverages for non-Muslims.

== Gallery ==
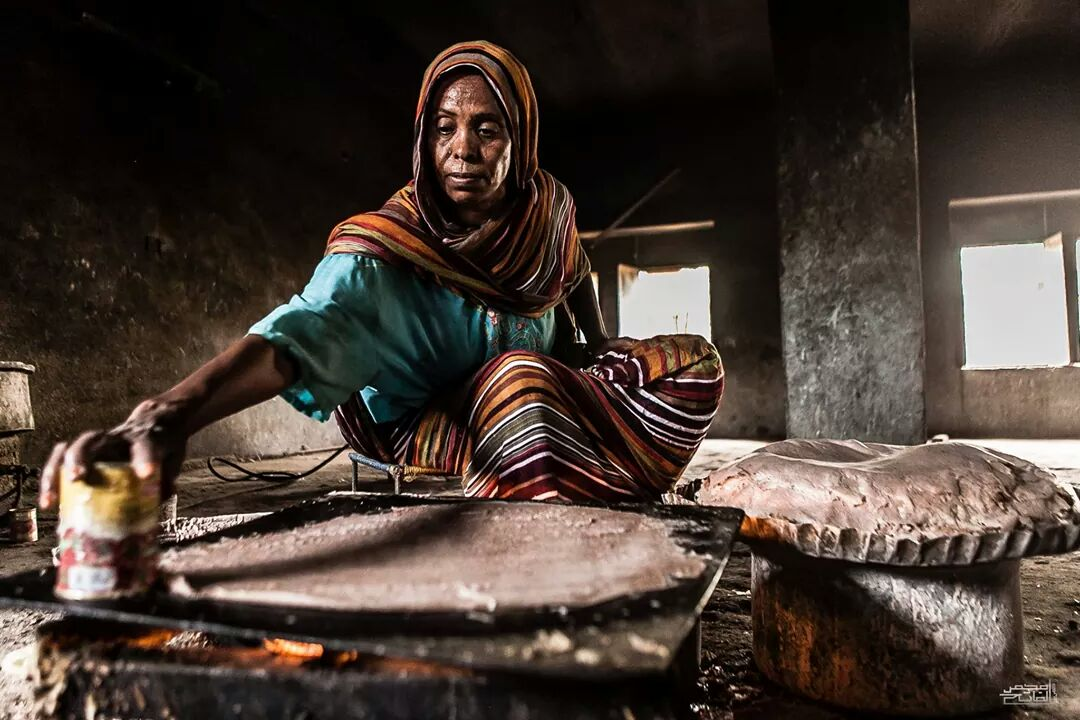
A woman preparing kisra

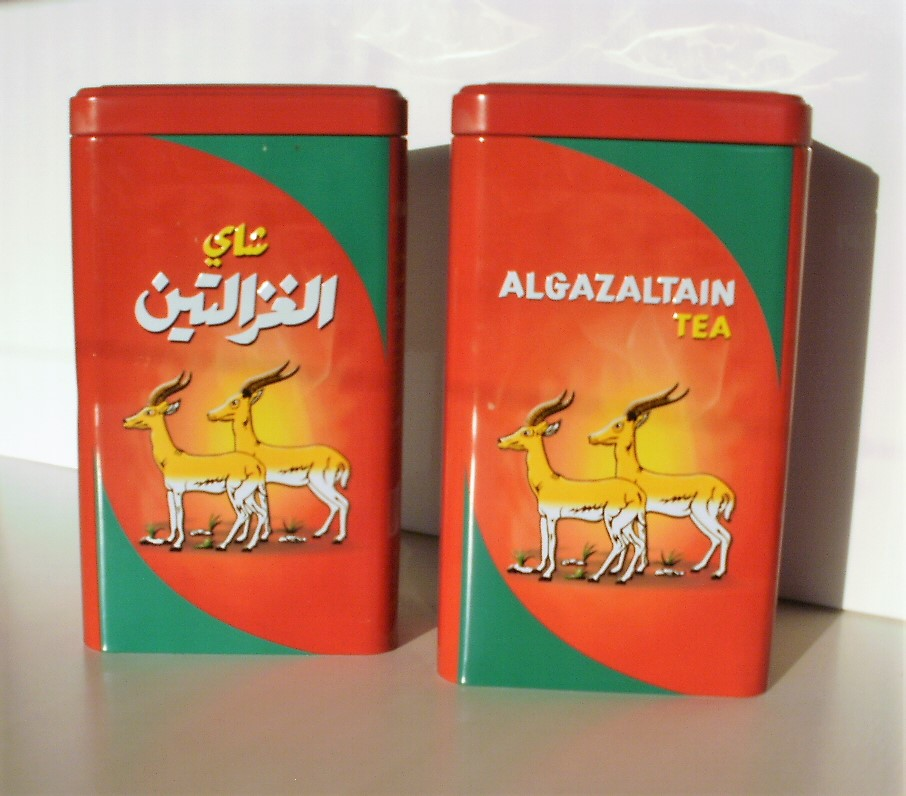
Algazaltain black tea

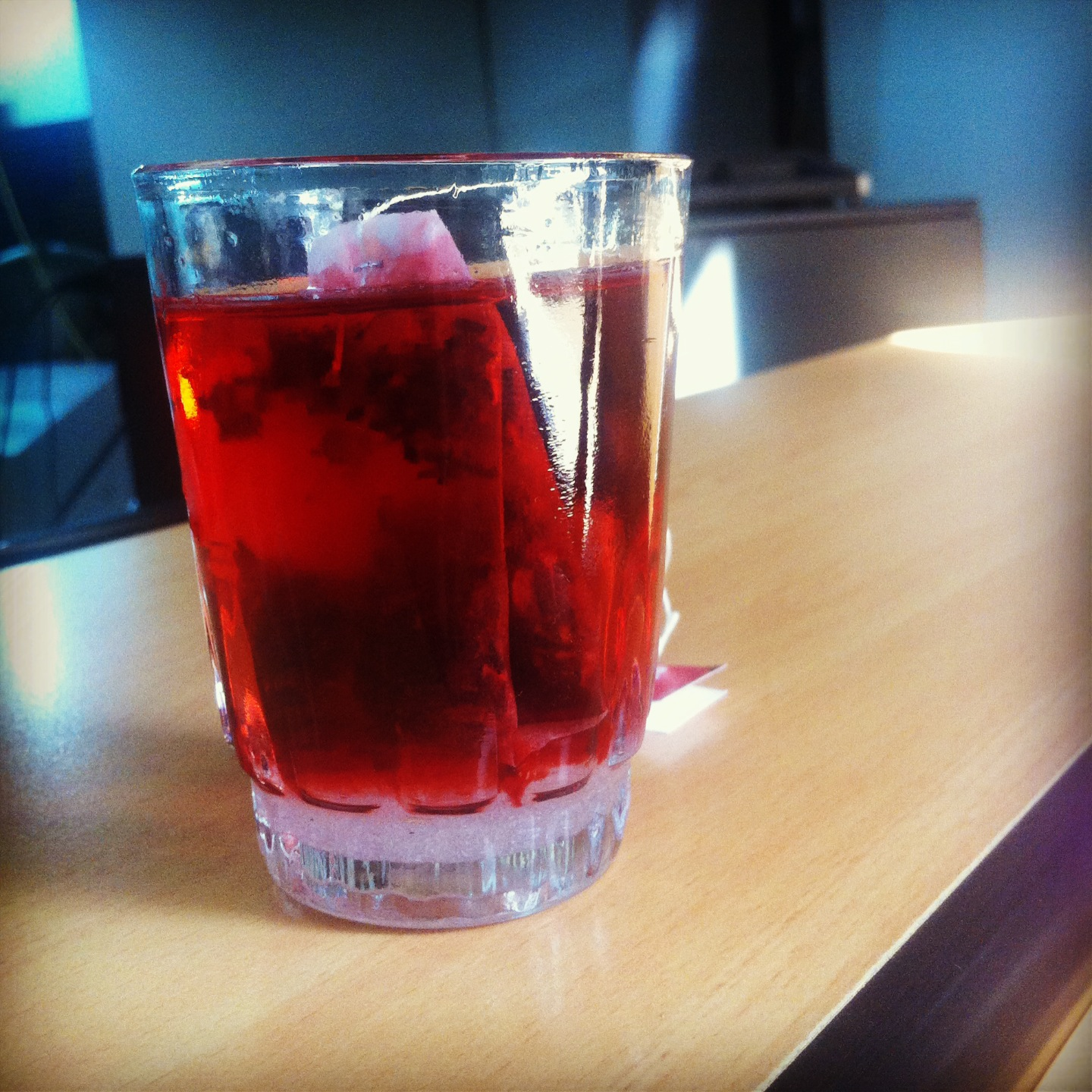
Cold karkadeh (hibiscus tea) drink

== See also ==
- List of African cuisines
