= Eeshwar =

Eeshwar may refer to:

- Ishvara, term for a Hindu god
- Eeshwar (1989 film), an Indian film
- Eeswar, a 2002 Indian Telugu-language film
- Eeshwar Nivas, Indian film director

== See also ==
- Isha (disambiguation)
