= Isha =

Isha may refer to:

- Isha prayer, the Islamic night-time daily prayer
- Isha (Fantasy), a fictional deity from Warhammer Fantasy
- Isha Foundation, a non-profit organization founded by Sadhguru Jaggi Vasudev
- Isha Upanishad, the Hindu religious text
- International Students of History Association (ISHA)
- Storm Isha, part of the 2023–24 European windstorm season

== Given name ==
- Isha Basant Joshi (1908–?), Indian author
- Isha Chawla (born 1988), Indian film actress
- Isha Datar (born 1988), Canadian biotechnologist
- Isha Johansen (born 1964), Sierra Leonean entrepreneur
- Isha Judd (born 1962), Australian writer
- Isha Khan Choudhury (born 1971), Indian politician
- Isha Koppikar (born 1976), Indian actress
- Isha Lakhani (born 1985), Indian tennis player
- Isha Rikhi (born 1993), Indian film actress
- Eisha Singh (born 1998), Indian actress
- Isha Sesay (born 1976), American journalist
- Isha Sharvani (born 1984), Indian dancer
- Isha Talwar (born 1987), Indian film actress
- Isha Diwan, fictional villain played by Kajol in the 1997 Indian film Gupt

== See also ==
- Ishvara, a concept in Hinduism
- Eeshwar (disambiguation)
- Esha (disambiguation)
- Ishita (disambiguation)
- Isa (disambiguation)
- Ish (disambiguation)
