= Esh =

Esh or ESH may refer to:

- Esh, County Durham, a village in England
- Esh (dish), a Chadian dish
- Esh (letter) (Ʃ, ʃ), a letter of the Latin script
- Brighton City Airport, in England
- Eshtehardi language
- Environment, safety and health
- Esher railway station, Surrey, National Rail station code
- Western Sahara, ISO 3166-1 alpha-3 country code
- Sarai Givaty's musician stage name

== See also ==
- Esha (disambiguation)
