= Jus de fruit =

Chadian fruit smoothie

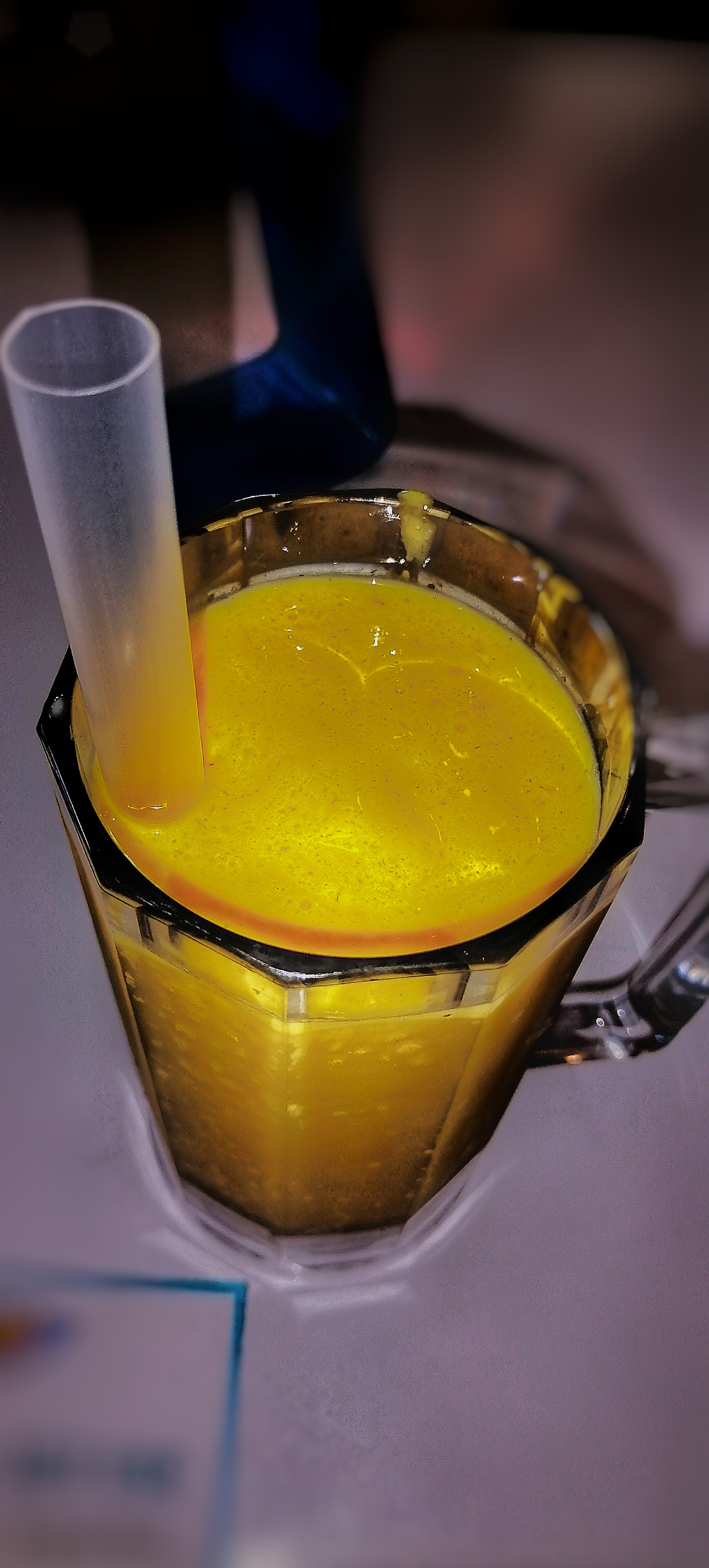
- Mango jus de fruit
- Type: Smoothie
- Course: Dessert
- Place of origin: Chad
- Serving temperature: Cold
- Main ingredients: Fruit (typically mango); Milk; Ice; Sugar; Cardamom
- Similar dishes: Mango lassi

Jus de fruit is a smoothie made in Chad. Though it can be directly translated as "fruit juice", it contains more than just fruit. It is typically made with mango, ice, whole milk, sugar, and cardamom. It can also be made with the recipient's preferred fruit or combination of fruits. Common fruits used in Chad include oranges, guavas, papayas, and pineapples. Milk powder may also be used as a substitute for whole milk. It is served as a dessert and often sold by small businesses.
