= Isabella Dalgarno =

Australian temperance activist

- Born: 1805; Aberdeen, Scotland
- Died: 18 June 1878 (aged 72–73)
- Known for: founding the Delgarno Institute
- Spouse: Joseph

Isabella Dalgarno born Isabella Gossip (1805 – 18 June 1878) was a Scottish born temperance advocate in Melbourne who settled and died in Williamstown in Victoria.

== Life ==
Dalgarno was born in 1805 in an area of Aberdeen known as Plains. Her parents were Isabella (born Robertson) and James Gossip and they lived in a croft. In 1830 she married into a seafaring family although her husband was a shoemaker named James Delgarno. In 1840 she was in Liverpool where she first took an interest in the cause of temperance. When she returned to Aberdeen, other temperance activists encouraged her to speak publicly, as the novelty of a woman speaking in public would create some interest. She was thanked in 1841 for presiding over the Aberdeen Female Teetotal Society before she joined her husband as he travelled back and forth carrying goods between Britain and Australia.

Dalgarno would give talks about temperance when they visited ports in Australia. Notably and frequently in Melbourne, where in 1842, she helped found the Melbourne Total Abstinence Society which was extant in 2023.

In 1844, she was again in Melbourne where she was admonished by a magistrate for speaking publicly against alcohol. The court case had been created by publicans and others trashing the room where she was speaking. They were led by Phillip Anderson, who was the publican of the Commercial Inn. The publican's claimed hypocrisy because her husband's cargo was frequently booze. The Delgarnos did not deny this but they said that they carried but they did not choose their cargo. It was said that alcoholism was less of a problem in Melbourne in the 1840s due to her work.

In 1852 they settled in Williamstown which is where she continued to speak against alcohol. Captain Delgarno was an abstainer and he survived a shipwreck in 1865. He commanded 22 staff on board the Invercauld and nineteen of them made it to the shores of the Auckland Islands. However, by the time that he was rescued there were only three survivors. A street in Williamstown is named for Captain Delgarno Joseph became a councillor and he operated a store.

== Death and legacy ==
Dalgarno died in the state of Victoria and she was buried in Williamstown in 1878. The Delgarno Institute is extant and continues her work against alcohol and other drugs gathering additions to "Isabella's List".
