= Teale Coco =

Australian model and designer

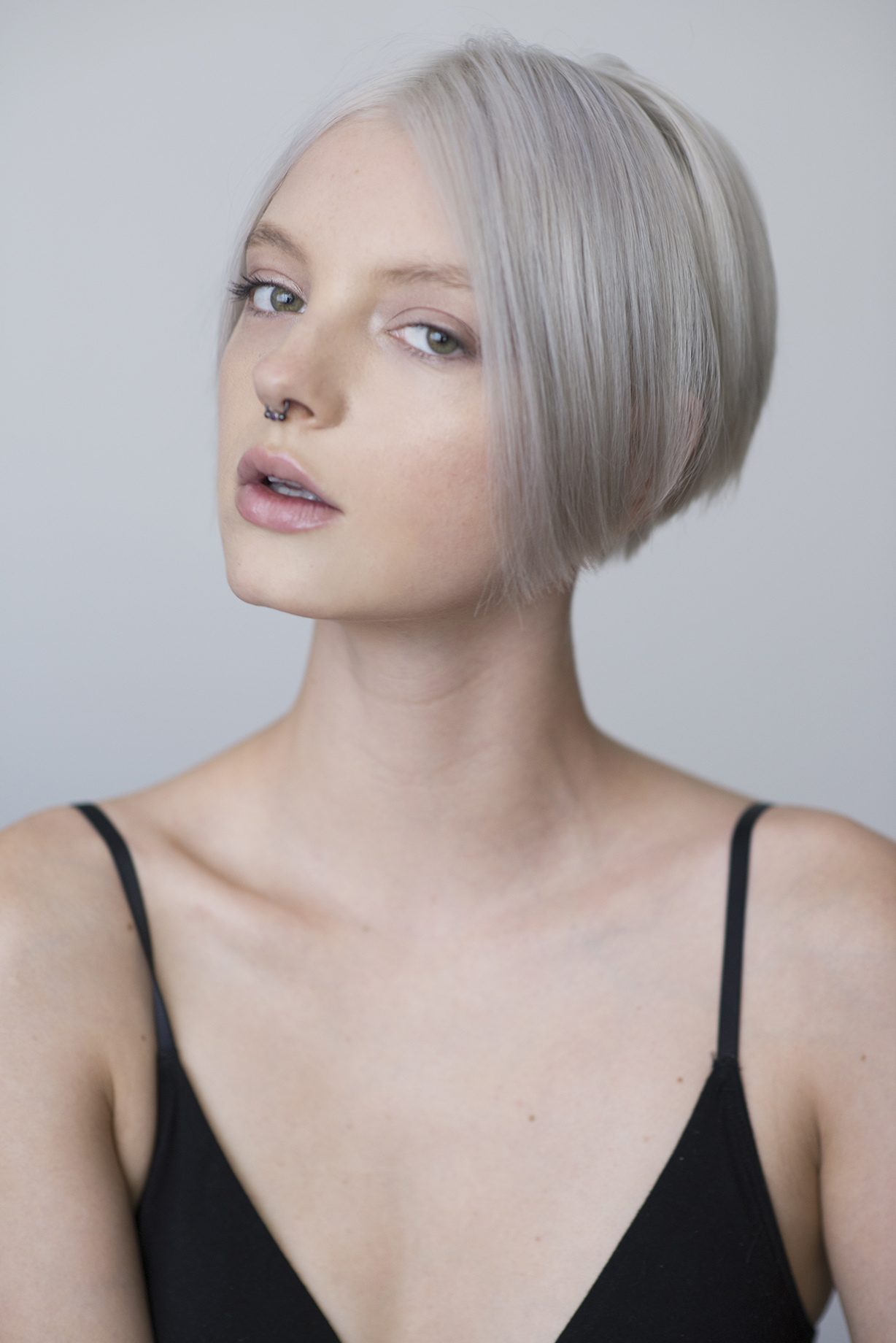
- Portrait of Teale Coco, January 2017
- Born: Teale Coco Roiz; 7 March 1992 (age 34); Melbourne, Australia
- Occupations: Model, fashion designer, photographer, creative Director, entrepreneur
- Years active: 2012-present
- Modeling information
- Height: 1.77 m (5 ft 10 in)
- Hair color: Blonde
- Eye color: Green
- Agency: Monster Mgmt-Italy Zucca Models-Japan
- Website: tealecoco.com

Teale Coco Roiz (born 7 March 1992) is an Australian model, fashion designer, photographer and owner of an eponymous fashion label.

== Early life and education ==
Teale Coco was born in Melbourne, Australia. "Her interest in photography began at a young age, where she would photograph herself and her surroundings." She studied at RMIT University in Melbourne, from where she graduated in 2012 with a Bachelor of Arts in photography with a minor in fashion. Coco said in an interview with i-D that while studying for a degree in photography, she was scouted for by a local modelling agency that placed her with her first international agencies in New Zealand, Korea and Japan. After graduating Coco signed an international contract in Japan, where she worked on contracts with agencies in Tokyo and Osaka.

== Modeling ==
Teale Coco found international placements with Premier Models in London, England, Monster Mgmt in Milan, Italy, and Muse Models in New York City, United States.

In 2016 Coco worked alongside Edward Enninful and Craig McDean photographing for W magazine where she was a featured model and artist in the August 2016 issue.

Coco appeared on the cover of L'Officiel Italia, September 2016, issue #17 with a nine-page editorial spread and interview on her fashion line, with photos shot by Brandon Mercer and styled by Nicola Formichetti

Shortly after Coco was photographed in New York City by Terry Richardson alongside Marilyn Manson for Dazed magazine's 25th anniversary issue, styled by Nicola Formichetti, wearing her own eponymously named design paired with Diesel (brand).

Coco has featured for numerous online editorials including NAKID magazine, Schön! magazine, KALTBLUT magazine, Fashion Journal, Elusive magazine, Vulkan magazine. and Sticks And Stones Mothership.

In 2016, Coco posed as the subject for a painting by American "pop surrealist" artist Michael Hussar.

== Teale Coco : the label ==
On a trip to Tokyo she had the idea of starting a fashion line of fetish-inspired accessories. The ancient Japanese art of Shibari, is one of the things that Coco has drawn inspiration from in her designs. She began selling these accessories branded "Teale Coco" online.

Coco began her fashion career posting on Instagram; Coco was later described as a "social media star" by I-D magazine in 2015. In 2013 Coco opened her self-titled fashion label "Teale Coco", selling her collections of fetish-inspired clothing and accessories.

Coco had no formal education in fashion, but drew upon her own personal taste for inspiration. Soon after she hired a professional seamstress who she began working with to manufacture her designs. Coco is part of the Body Positive Movement "There should be no restrictions, either by gender, age or size", making her designs available in a full and customized sizing range.

Coco and her designs were featured the following year on Vogue.com in June, 2016. In April 2017, Vogue Germany featured Coco and her designs in an article entitled "Hard and tender: How young designers bring "fetish" into the mainstream".

The popular American online alternative fashion retailer Dolls Kill carries "Teale Coco The Brand" in its store.

In 2017 she changed the name of the company from "Teale Coco The Brand" to "Teale Coco The Label."
