= Stephany Avila =

Australian actress

Stephany Austin (born 17 May 1995 in Melbourne) is an Australian actress. Stephany Austin's work in the industry started with the lead role in the short film Crimes of the Heart directed by Robyn Hughan.

Austin is best known for her portrayal of Eleanor 'Scubi' Scubinski in the 9 Network Television Series Holly's Heroes and for her role of Tania next to Rose Byrne and Ronald Jacobson in the featured film I Love You Too written by Peter Helliar.

== Life ==
Austin, fluently speaking both English and Spanish. At the early age of 4 years old Austin began her studies of Performing Arts. Since then, she has been working as a professional actress, acting in theatre, television and films.

== Acting career ==
Director Robyn Hughan found Austin had a depth that was incredible for her age and selected her to play the lead role in the short film Crimes of the Heart (2004). She appeared in the Australian TV Drama Series Neighbours (2003). Austin was part of the main cast of Channel 9 Television Series Holly's Heroes playing the role of 'Scubi' (2004). She acted as 'Naomi' in the Television Series The Elephant Princess (2007) and played the role of Amy in the television improvised comedy program Thank God You're Here (2009). Austin starred in the romantic comedy written by Peter Helliar I Love You Too as the role of Tania (2009). The actress made her artistic debut in Argentina featuring in the Music Video Cal y Arena by Argentinean band 'Las Sabrosas Zariguellas' (2010) starring next to Raúl Lavié and Miguel Angel Rodriguez. Austin has continued her career in Australia as teen lead Mackenzie (Mack) in "Clique" (2014). She is currently in Vancouver, Canada.

Year	Title	Film	TV	Theatre
2014	Clique		Yes	
2010	Cal y Arena		Yes	
2009	I Love You Too	Yes		
2009	Thank God your Here		Yes	
2007	The Elephant Princess		Yes	
2004	Holly's Heroes		Yes	
2003	Neighbours		Yes	
2003	On the Bench	Yes		
2003	Annie			Yes
2002	Crimes of the Heart	Yes		
2002	The King and I			Yes
2001	Oliver			Yes
