= Nikos Pantazopoulos =

Australian artist and academic

- Born: 1973 (age 52–53); Melbourne, Australia
- Education: Monash University
- Occupations: Artist, lecturer

Nikos Pantazopoulos (born 1973) is an Australian artist and lecturer at RMIT University.

== Education ==
Nikos Pantazopoulos earned a Bachelor of Fine Arts in Photography at the Victorian College of the Arts in 1998. He earned a Master of Fine Arts at Goldsmiths, University of London, and a PhD at Monash University in 2013.

== Art ==
Pantazopoulos' work deals primarily with his background as a Greek and a gay man, especially through the lens of ancient Greek culture and homosexuality in ancient Greece. His photographic work "Hairy Arse" explored standards of male beauty and Classical Greek culture.

Pantazopoulos' work was included in the "Queer Economies" program at the Centre for Contemporary Photography, and at the 2020 "Friendship as a Way of Life" exhibit at the University of New South Wales. He has also been exhibited at The Substation and the Westspace Gallery. His style has been described as borrowing from Minimalism.

== Personal life ==
Pantazopoulos is openly gay and a Greek Australian.
