= Intrastructural help =

Lymphocyte activity

Intrastructural help (ISH) is where T and B cells cooperate to help or suppress an immune response gene. ISH has proven effective for the treatment of influenza, rabies related lyssavirus, hepatitis B, and the HIV virus. This process was used in 1979 to observe that T cells specific to the influenza virus could promote the stimulation of hemagglutinin specific B cells and elicit an effective humoral immune response. It was later applied to the lyssavirus and was shown to protect raccoons from lethal challenge. The ISH principle is especially beneficial because relatively invariable structural antigens can be used for the priming of T-cells to induce humoral immune response against variable surface antigens. Thus, the approach has also transferred well for the treatment of hepatitis B and HIV.

== Background ==
One of the approaches for a protective HIV-1 vaccine is broadly neutralizing antibodies. These antibodies are found in 10-25 % of HIV-1 infected patients. Few of those (worldwide 0.8% of HIV-1 positive individuals) are able to suppress viremia up to a level that is below the detection levels and are so-called "elite controllers" or "long term non-progressors". Most of the conducted vaccine trials were unable to induce protective neutralizing antibodies; even though some protective effects of poly-functional antibodies were observed. These Fc-dependent effects seem to play an important role in disease control as shown by the non-human primate (NHP) experiment. In contrast, the results of the adenoviral-based STEP trial suggested a higher susceptibility due to high levels of non-neutralizing poly-functional antibodies and helper T cell proliferation induced by vaccination. In mouse models antibodies from the IgG1 subclass, which were mostly induced by vaccination, were seen to possess a relatively low functionality. Therefore, one objective is to increase the quality of the immune response by the induction of poly-functional antibody sub classes, e.g. IgG2A. However, according to results from animal studies, cytotoxic T cells seem to be mandatory for a protective vaccine. Although this was not detectable in the human trials conducted to-date, it is assumed that reduction of viral loads early after infection can be achieved. Thus the current goal is to avoid uncontrolled T cell proliferation and modulate the humoral immune response towards highly efficient poly-functional monoclonal antibodies.

=== ISH in HIV treatment ===
This vaccination approach aims to induce a protective humoral and also cellular immune response by a two-step immunization scheme. The first step is based on a DNA vaccine vector in order to prime T cells. In the case of HIV, T cells specific for the group-specific antigen (Gag) are stimulated. For the second step a formulation of nano particles or virus-like particles is vaccinated. These particles contain Gag protein and HIV-Env surface protein. These particles can be recognized by B cells and subsequently be internalized, processed and presented on the cell surface on MHC-II, in combination with the primed Gag-specific T cells. This was shown to lead to a strong activation of the B cells and ultimately to the production of Env-specific antibodies by the activated B cells. In HIV research, this method was shown to enhance the specific humoral immune response and at the same time avoid an excess activation of the cellular immune response which could otherwise cause disease progression to thrive. Timewise the priming of T cells for Gag reduces the variation of the viral Env because of the lack of Env specific T cells between priming and second vaccination. This decreases the chances of escape variants developing before the boosting immunization.

=== Current HIV Research ===
One of the key aspects here is the precise modulation of the immune response upon activation. This implies good quantity and quality of induced antibodies but low levels of T cell stimulation to avoid aforementioned increased susceptibility and disease progression. First in vitro and immunization experiments conducted with Simian Immunodeficiency virus (SIV), showed a 10-50 fold increase in Env-specific antibodies of treated mice compared to exosome vaccinated ones. and was also verified for HIV in the mouse model by adoptive transfer experiments. Non-human primate experiments also indicate increased Env Ab titers upon Gag pre-immunization. It is likely to assume that these results are transferable to humans as HIV-1 patients with neutralizing antibodies were shown to possess increased numbers of Gag-specific T cells but time wise comparable levels of Env gp120 specific T cells. This points towards a contribution of the intrastructural help to the neutralization ability.
