= Monica Bello (basketball) =

Australian-Italian basketball player

Personal information
- Born: 16 September 1978 (age 48) Melbourne, Australia
- Listed height: 1.70 m (5 ft 7 in)
- Position: Point guard

Career history
- 2001–2002: Delta Alessandria
- 2002–2005: Rovereto Basket
- 2005–2007: Basket Parma
- 2007–2009: Taranto Cras Basket
- 2009–2010: Hapoel Tel Aviv
- 2011: CUS Chieti
- 2011: Forestville Eagles
- 2011–2012: Adelaide Lightning
- 2013: Forestville Eagles

Monica Bello (born 16 September 1978) is a former Australian – Italian female professional basketball player.
