= Ishita Roy =

Indian politician

- Citizenship: Indian
- Occupation: Former Civil Servant

Ishita Roy has been a Civil servant in the Indian Administrative Service( IAS).

She has served in various departments and ministries in the provincial Government of Kerala and Government of India. Her primary areas of work include: Finance, information technology and communications and education ( Ministry of Human Resources Development). She has worked in other departments and Ministries including District Collector/ Magistrate of two districts in Kerala and Chhattisgarh in India.

She has also worked in Environment, Agriculture, Fisheries and Textiles.

She holds an Independent Director’s Databank Registration Certificate issued by the Indian Institute of Corporate Affairs, Government of India.

Ms. Ishita Roy has been the first elected Secretary General from India in the international Sericultural Commission, the UN registered inter-governmental organization committed for the development of silk industry at global level. With this election, the office of the international Sericultural Commission located at Lyon, France from 1870 to 2012 was shifted to Bangalore, India and started its operations in India from 1 January 2013. Currently there are 23 countries as the Members of the international Sericultural Commission.

Ms. Roy entered the Indian Administrative Service (IAS) during 1991 under the Kerala cadre batch.

During the 34 years of illustrious service in various government departments and an inter-governmental organization, Ms. Roy has been conferred with many awards, few of which are given below:

1) Gems of Digital India Award 2018: A Digital Depository called National Academic Depository (NAD), which is an initiative of Digital Depository of Academic Awards (Degrees, Diplomas, Certificates, Mark sheets etc.) lodged by academic institutions universities and colleges) in digital formats on 24x7 online mode helping in validating their authenticity, safe storage and retrieval.

2) Excellence GIS Technology: GIS Technology in Sericulture Development in the country given by Dept. of Administrative Reforms, and Public Grievances of Govt. of India.

3) Innovative use of GIS Technology in e-Governance: National Award given by the Government of India for e-Governance for outstanding achievement in innovative use of GIS Tech. in Sericulture Development in the country.

4) Election of Secretary General: Elected by the countries of a UN registered inter- governmental organization namely; International Sericultural Commission (ISC). Consequently, the ISC which was initiated by Sir Louis Pasteur in 1870 was shifted from Lyon, France to Bangalore, India in 2013.

5) Social Impact Award: Award has been given in recognition of contribution made in successfully leading the Project involving development and promotion of micro entrepreneurial models built around the tasar silk value chain for tribal communities for alleviation of chronic poverty and ensuring food security. The project was implemented :with NGOs to mobilize the required social capital. Inclusive growth, socioeconomic transformation and women empowerment was the salient output of the initiative undertaken in Bihar.

6) e-Krishi Award : National Award given by Govt. of India for e- Governance under which an application with focus on farmers was developed.

7) e-governance award: National Award given by the Govt of India for e-Governance for outstanding achievement in e-Krishi of Kerala State.
