= Esha Sethi Thirani =

Indian fashion designer

Esha Sethi Thirani (born in Kolkata, 9 October 1986) is an Indian fashion designer with her own label based in the cultural city of Calcutta, once the capital of British India, situated in the eastern part of the country. She showcased her Autumn Winter 2018 Couture Collection ‘QALAMKAR' at The Intercontinental, Le Grand Palais, Paris, during The Paris Fashion Week.

== Career ==
Upon graduating from Lancaster University in the UK with an M.A in Human Resources and Knowledge management in 2008, Esha returned to Kolkata realizing her true calling was in the field of fashion and creative arts.

She began her career studying fashion design at The Bhawanipur Education Society College, where she won the ‘Designer of the Year’ award in 2012.

She started her eponymous label ‘Esha Sethi Thirani' in 2013.

In 2018, Esha Sethi Thirani showcased her Autumn Winter 2018 Couture Collection ‘QALAMKAR' on 3 March 2018 at The Intercontinental, Le Grand Palais, Paris, during The Paris Fashion Week.

== Bollywood and Esha ==
Esha Sethi Thirani has styled celebrities like Shraddha Kapoor, Sonakshi Sinha, Aditi Rao Hydari, Taapsee Pannu, Lara Dutta, Amyra Dastur, Shriya Saran, Gauhar Khan, etc.
