= La bouillie (Chadian food) =

Chadian breakfast porridge

- Type: Porridge
- Course: Breakfast
- Place of origin: Chad
- Associated cuisine: Chadian cuisine
- Serving temperature: Hot
- Main ingredients: Milk; Wheat berry or rice; Flour or millet paste
- Ingredients generally used: Peanut butter; Brown sugar
- Similar dishes: Oatmeal

La bouillie is a porridge from Chad similar to oatmeal. It is made from milk and wheat berry or rice, thickened with flour or millet paste, and sweetened with peanut butter or brown sugar. It can be further flavored with lemon or buttermilk to make it tangy. It is topped with bananas, strawberries, ginger, peanuts, or whatever is locally available. La bouillie is a breakfast dish meant to be served hot.

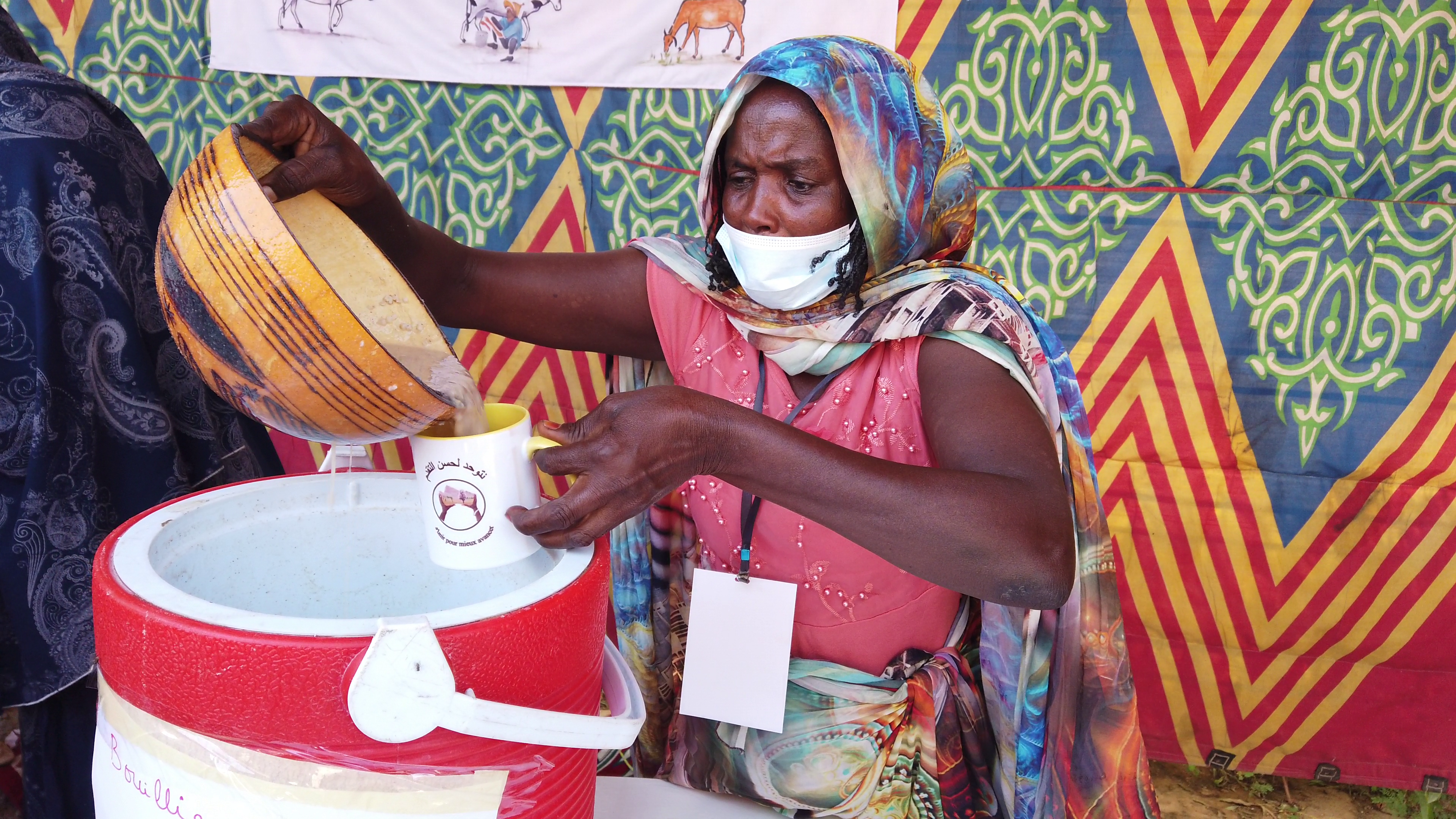
Woman serving la bouillie
