= Ish-Shalom =

Ish-Shalom (Hebrew: איש שלום, lit. 'Man of Peace') is a name. People with the name include:

- Mordechai Ish-Shalom (1902–1991), Israeli politician
- Tamar Ish-Shalom (fl. 2011), Israeli journalist and TV presenter
- Ish-Shalom, pseudonym of Meir Friedmann (1831–1908), Hungarian rabbi

== See also ==
- Judaism and peace
- איש-שלום
