= Nowabad-e Ish =

- Location in Afghanistan
- Coordinates: 38°0′13″N 70°29′46″E
- Country: Afghanistan
- Province: Badakhshan Province
- District: Kuf Ab District
- Time zone: + 4.30

Nowabad-e Ish is a village in Badakhshan Province in north-eastern Afghanistan.

== See also ==
- Badakhshan Province
