= Kisra =

Bread made in Sudan

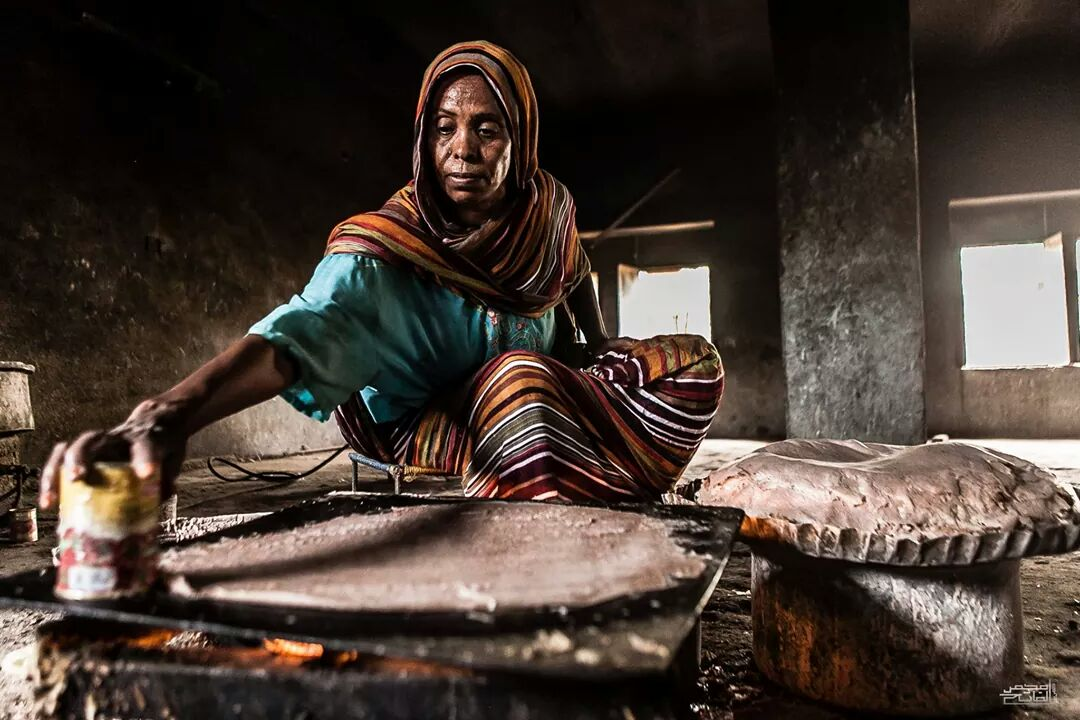
- A woman making kisra
- Type: Flatbread
- Place of origin: Sudan
- Main ingredients: Sorghum flour
- Similar dishes: Injera

Kisra, also spelled kissra (Sudanese Arabic: [ˈkisra]), is a Sudanese popular thin fermented bread made in Sudan, Chad, South Sudan, Algeria and some parts of Uganda and Kenya. It is made from durra or wheat.

There are two different forms of kisra: thin baked sheets, known as kisra rhaheefa, which is similar to injera; and a porridge known as kisra aseeda or aceda. The latter is usually paired with a meat and vegetable stew, such as mullah.

As of 1995, the then-undivided country of Sudan ate an estimated 20,000 to 30,000 short tons (18,000 to 27,000 t) of sorghum flour annually in kisra.

In 2025, CNN listed kisra as one of the world's top 50 breads.

== Sorghum in kisra ==
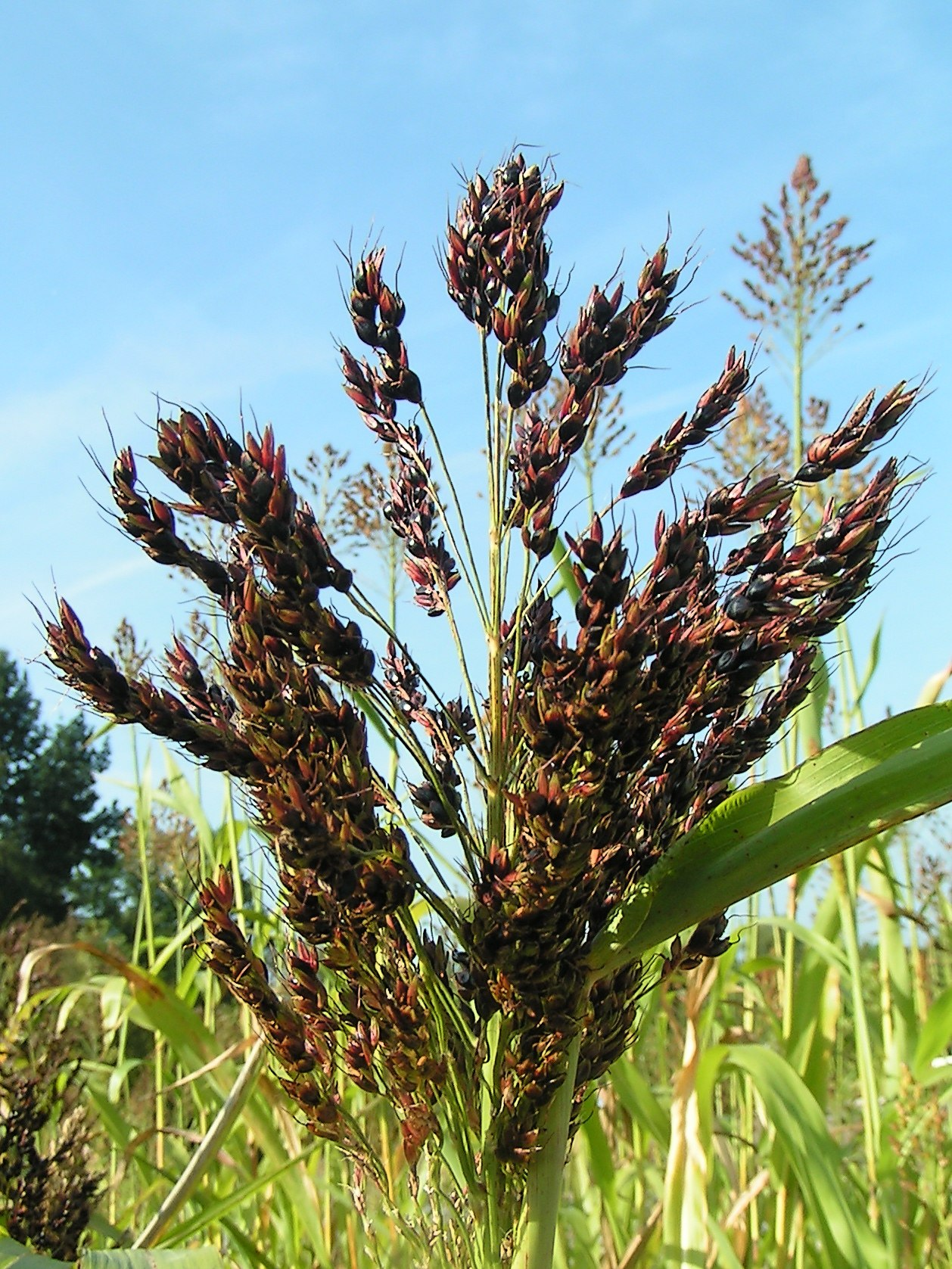
A sorghum plant

Traditionally, in Sudanese households, sorghum is used as a base for making kisra. Sorghum grains are known for having high nutritional value through its minerals and vitamins, which contribute to its anti-inflammatory properties. Two common sorghum varieties are feterita and tabat, which are used to mill fermented flour. This flour is then used in fermented batter that contains a starter from fungal or bacterial fermentation.

In 2025, Sudan joined the United Nations' global initiative "One Country One Priority Product" to promote export of sorghum. Previously, sorghum production has stalled, and the crop has been a victim of inflation, making it difficult to make kisra and other sorghum-based foods. Some Sudanese families have turned to other alternatives, like sweet potato porridge.

== Preparation ==
The making of kisra is strongly gendered and typically done only by women. A recipe for kisra is included in Omer Al Tijani's 2025 cookbook "The Sudanese Kitchen."

=== Grinding sorghum ===
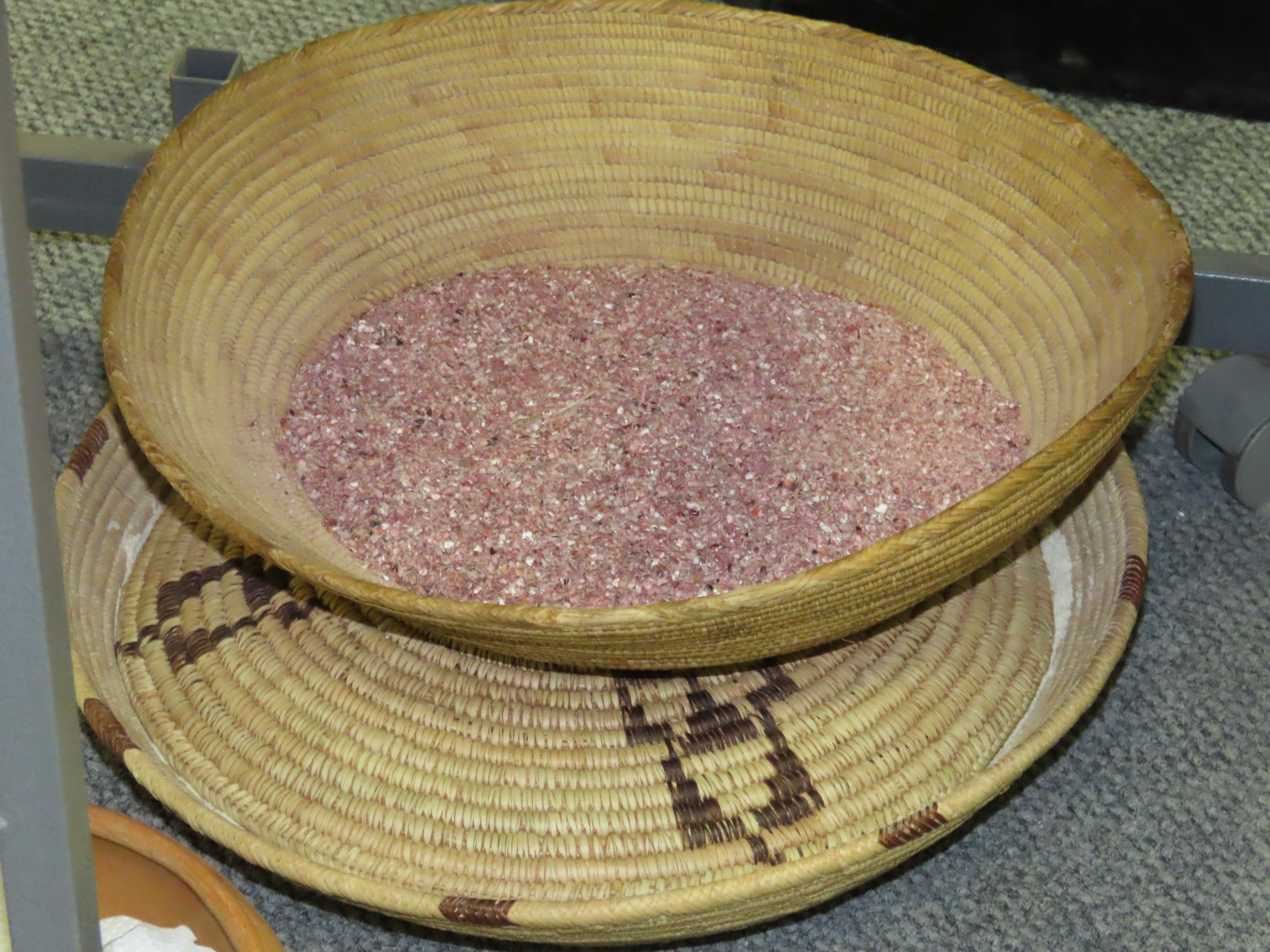
A bowl of sorghum flour from Namibia

Sorghum is traditionally ground into sorghum flour using saddle quern and grindstones. A saddle quern can withstand up to 2-3 generations of use, and the stone is replaced when dull. The sorghum is soaked in water for one hour, then it is run through the grindstone up to 3 times to create a fine powder. The finished flour is dried in the sun before consumption. In larger cities, families can also buy machine-ground sorghum flour at markets.

=== Fermentation ===
The sorghum flour is mixed with water and some salt to create a paste. The batter is left to ferment overnight to create a sourdough. Sometimes, it can be mixed with a small amount of older batter that acts as a starter. Fermentation prevents food poisoning by degrading contaminants and suppressing the growth of bacteria.

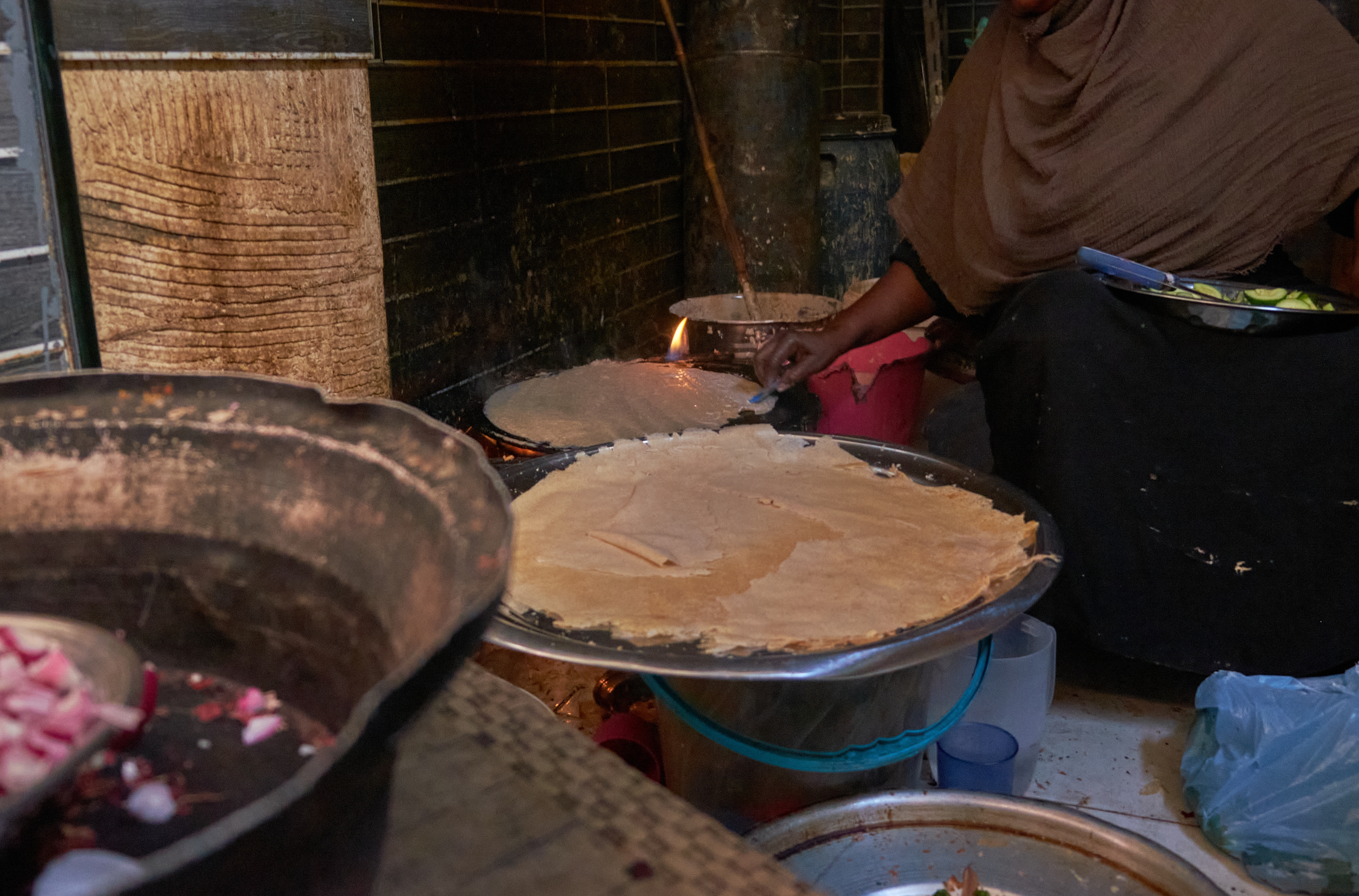
A freshly-cooked kisra

=== Baking ===
Kisra is typically cooked in the early morning. Oil or animal fat is added to the douka, a traditional metal or clay griddle. The batter is spread out thin over the surface in order to create a paper thin texture. It takes only about half a minute to cook through.

== See also ==
- List of breads
- Lahoh
- Sudanese cuisine
