= Esh (dish) =

Chadian dish

Esh (Chadian Arabic: عيش (/ʔeːʃ/)), also spelled aiyash, is a common Chadian dish made of boiled flour, typically served with moulah sauce. Esh is a staple food of Chad and is often eaten daily for lunch and dinner. It is consumed throughout Chad and is known by different names such as gou in Zaghawa and tii in Dazaga.
