= Isha Judd =

Australian writer and spiritual teacher

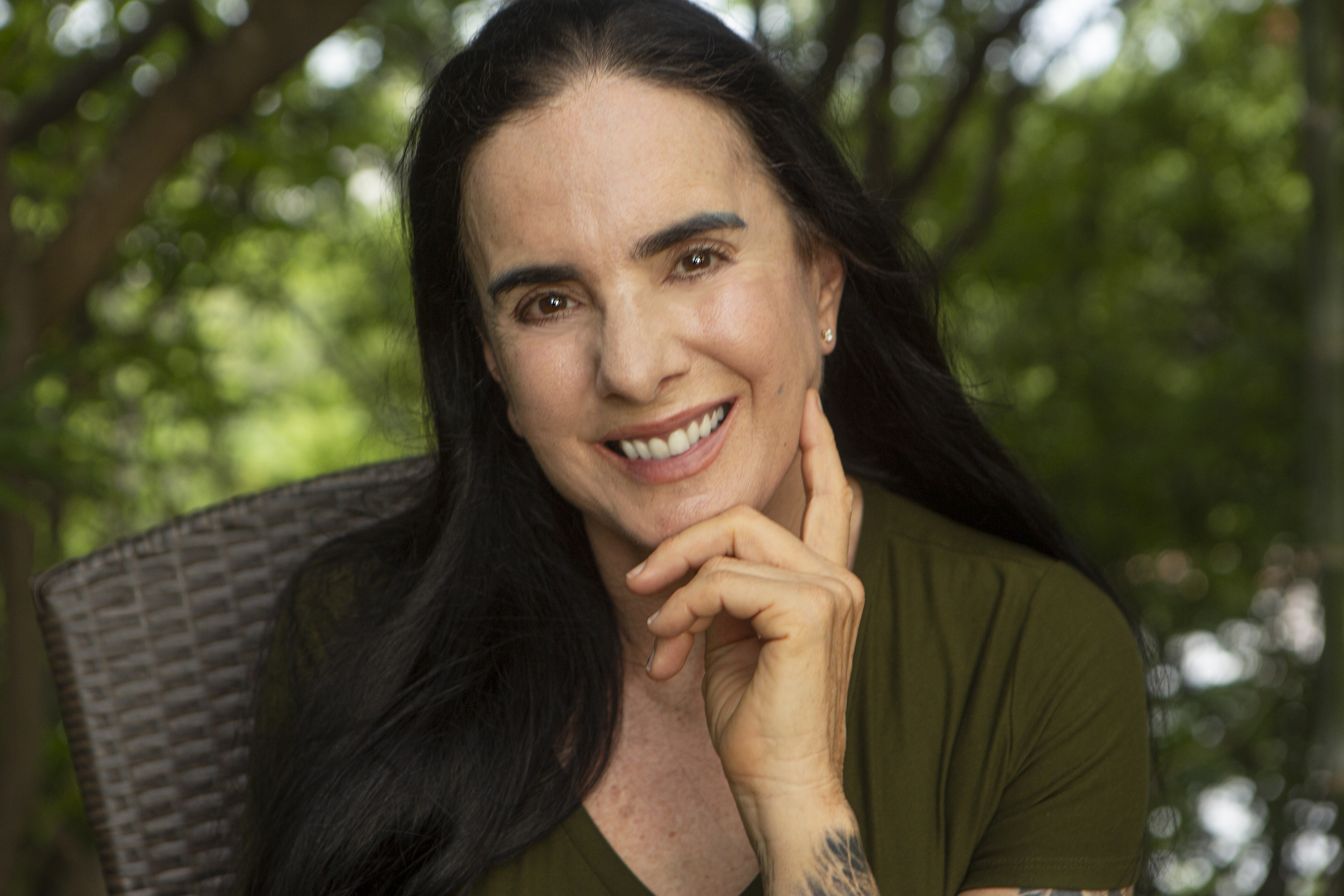
- Isha Judd in 2019
- Born: 1 May 1962 (age 64); Melbourne, Australia
- Writing career
- Subjects: Philosophy, spirituality, education
- Notable work: Why Walk When You Can Fly?

Isha Judd (born 1 May 1962 in Melbourne, Australia) is a writer and spiritual teacher who has gained popularity in Latin America.

== Educational Meditation ==
Judd is the creator of a system for self knowledge and expansion of consciousness called Educational Meditation. It is a program based on a meditation technique integrated with other complementary practices. It includes a set of self-knowledge educational principles to encourage self development and nurture coexistence. Judd's Educational Foundation brought together a multidisciplinary team of professionals to design a comprehensive program covering all levels of education: preschool, school, university, and other educational areas such as health, psychology, psychopedagogy, arts, communication, human relations, peace culture, intercultural dialogue and social cohesion. This educational meditation technique develops universal values such as appreciation, gratitude, love and unity.

The complementary practices to promote comprehensive health include: experiencing full consciousness or being in the doing, exercise, nutrition and hydration, and the honest and open expression of thoughts and feelings.

The educational principles of self-knowledge are: happiness, peace and love are an internal experience (introspection development). Emotions are natural so one must feel and manage them properly (emotional learning development). What you focus on grows (value-based education development). The relationship with self is reflected in the relationship with others (development of responsibility).

This is how the meditation integrated with complementary practices develops the self and coexistence: by leading us to a state of inner peace and incorporating values that generate the experience of a positive behavioral change. From a theoretical and practical point of view, self-knowledge educational principles have the same effect and all the components of Educational Meditation work synergistically.

Judd works with prisoners and victims of natural disasters through her foundation. In 2010, following her work in the prisons of Buenos Aires, Judd was named Ambassador For Peace in a ceremony at the Argentinean Senate. In 2012, she received an Honorary Degree from the Universidad Internacional, Cuernavaca, Mexico for her "humanitarian efforts and contributing to the betterment of the human condition through personal growth."

Through her foundation, Judd has taught her system to Mexican soldiers, with the support of the Morelos State Commission of Human Rights (CDHM), in order to help prevent human rights violations within the Mexican Army.

Judd has stated that, following a series of setbacks and personal losses when she was 28, she began a process of inner exploration, leading eventually to a profound spiritual awakening and later the development of her own system for the expansion of consciousness.

Judd has two international retreat centers, located in Costa Azul, Uruguay, and in Manzanillo, Mexico.

== Publications ==
=== Books ===
- Why Walk When You Can Fly: Soar Beyond Your Fears and Love Yourself and Others Unconditionally, 2008, New World Library, ISBN 978-1-57731-637-4
- Love Has Wings: Free Yourself from Limiting Beliefs and Fall in Love with Life, 2012, New World Library, ISBN 1-60868-121-1
- Love Above all Things: A Journey To Enlightenment, 2012, CreateSpace Independent Publishing Platform, ISBN 978-1475200850
- Iko and the Lost Diamond of Atlantis, 2012, CreateSpace Independent Publishing Platform, ISBN 978-1480273641
- Above the Clouds, 2013, CreateSpace Independent Publishing Platform
- The Global Citizen: Building a Culture of Peace from the Inside Out, 2014, CreateSpace Independent Publishing Platform, ISBN 978-1502524287

=== Movies ===
- Why Walk When You Can Fly?, 2009
- Above the Clouds, 2013

=== Music ===
- Guru Cool, 2006
