= List of Drag Race Down Under episodes =

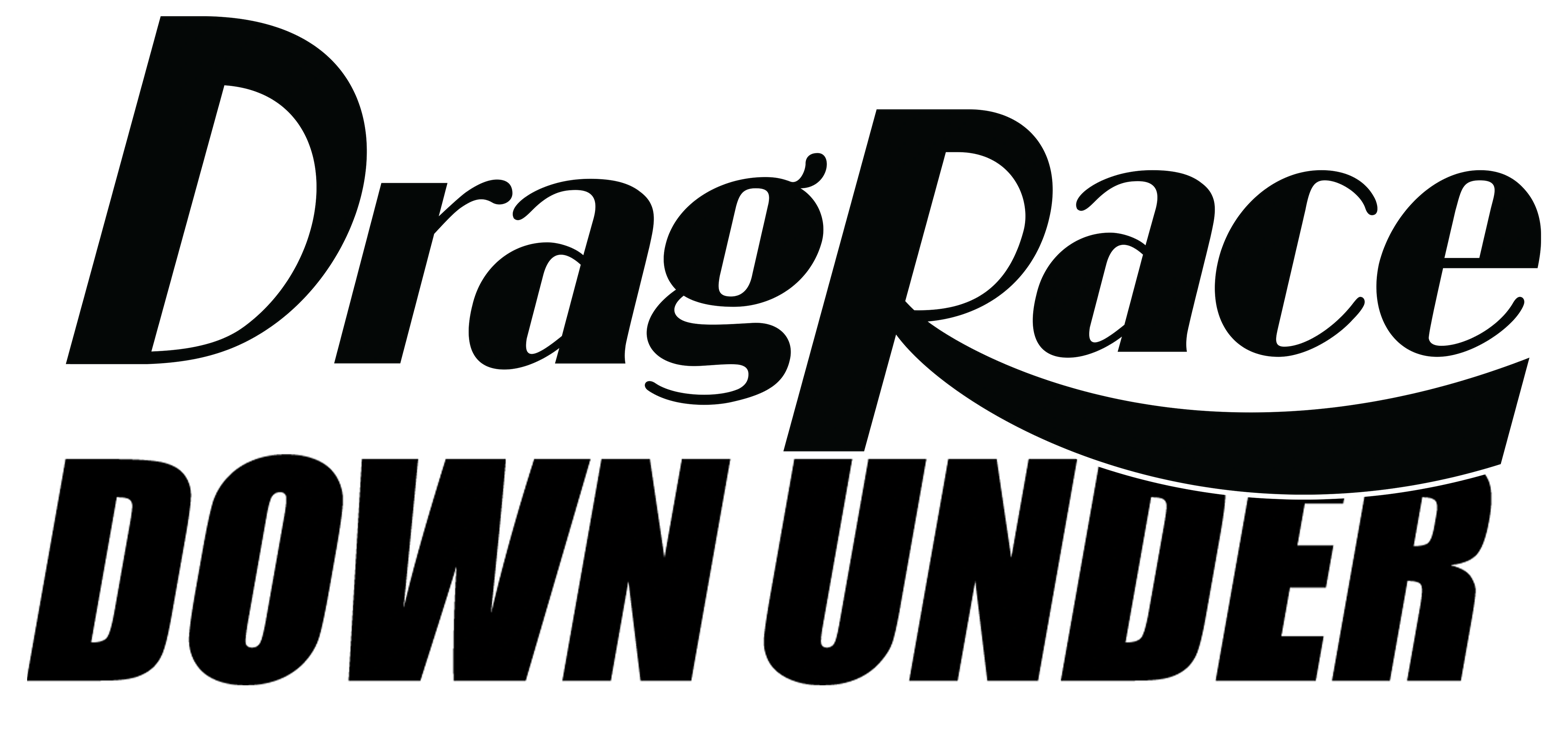
Logo for Drag Race Down Under

Drag Race Down Under (formerly RuPaul's Drag Race Down Under) is a reality competition streaming television series based on the American television series of the same name produced by World of Wonder and Warner Bros. International Television Production New Zealand. The show documents RuPaul and a panel of judges' search for "Down Under's next drag superstar". Contestants of Drag Race Down Under are either from Australia or New Zealand. RuPaul plays several roles on the show including host, mentor, and head judge for the series, as the contestants are given different challenges to participate in each week. The show also employs a panel of judges: RuPaul, Michelle Visage, and Rhys Nicholson. The series premiered on TVNZ 2 and TVNZ OnDemand in New Zealand, Stan in Australia, and on WOW Presents Plus internationally on 1 May 2021. The series is also streaming on BBC Three and BBC iPlayer in the United Kingdom, and broadcast by both Crave and its associated streaming service in Canada.

The ten drag queens from season one compete for the title of the "Down Under's first Drag Superstar", a one-year supply of Revolution Beauty Cosmetics, and a cash prize of $30,000. The winner of the first season of Drag Race Down Under was Kita Mean. In September 2021, the series was renewed for a second season. Casting closed on 5 October 2021. It premiered on July 30, 2022. The winner of the second season of Drag Race Down Under was Spankie Jackzon. Casting for season three opened on 24 October 2022. It aired from 28 July to 15 September 2023. Isis Avis Loren won season 3.

== Series overview ==
Season	Contestants	Episodes	Originally released		Winner	Runner(s)-up
Season	Contestants	Episodes	First released	Last released	Winner	Runner(s)-up
1	10	8	1 May 2021	19 June 2021	Kita Mean	Art Simone; Karen from Finance; Scarlet Adams
2	10	8	30 July 2022	17 September 2022	Spankie Jackzon	Hannah Conda; Kween Kong
3	10	8	28 July 2023	15 September 2023	Isis Avis Loren	Gabriella Labucci
4	10	8	1 November 2024	20 December 2024	Lazy Susan	Mandy Moobs; Vybe

== Episodes ==
=== Season 1 (2021) ===
No. overall	No. in season	Title	Original release date
1	1	"G'day, G'day, G'day"	1 May 2021
2	2	"Snatch Game"	8 May 2021
3	3	"Queens Down Under"	15 May 2021
4	4	"Rucycled"	22 May 2021
5	5	"Marketing Hats"	29 May 2021
6	6	"Family Resemblance"	5 June 2021
7	7	"Talent Show Extravaganza"	12 June 2021
8	8	"Down Under Grand Finale"	19 June 2021

=== Season 2 (2022) ===
No. overall	No. in season	Title	Original release date
9	1	"Grand Opening"	30 July 2022
10	2	"Cagey Queens"	6 August 2022
11	3	"Bottomless Brunch"	13 August 2022
12	4	"Snatch Game"	20 August 2022
13	5	"Bosom Buddies"	27 August 2022
14	6	"Hometown Hunnies"	3 September 2022
15	7	"Drag Family Makeover"	10 September 2022
16	8	"Grand Finale"	17 September 2022

=== Season 3 (2023) ===
No. overall	No. in season	Title	Original release date
17	1	"Mardi Gras Pride"	28 July 2023
18	2	"Muriel's Bedding"	4 August 2023
19	3	"Fake Housewives of Down Under"	11 August 2023
20	4	"Snatch Game - Down Under Season 3"	18 August 2023
21	5	"BMX Bitches"	25 August 2023
22	6	"Drag Brunch"	1 September 2023
23	7	"Terriers in Tiaras"	8 September 2023
24	8	"Grand Finale - Down Under Season 3"	15 September 2023

=== Season 4 (2024) ===
No. overall	No. in season	Title	Original release date
25	1	"Doubling Down"	1 November 2024
26	2	"Mr. Right or Mr. Right Now?"	8 November 2024
27	3	"Snatch Me"	15 November 2024
28	4	"Fierce Fabulous Fashion"	22 November 2024
29	5	"Booked and Beautiful"	29 November 2024
30	6	"Platy-Pussies On Fire"	6 December 2024
31	7	"The Rhys Roast"	13 December 2024
32	8	"Grand Finale"	20 December 2024
