= Maxi Shield =

Australian drag performer (1974–2026)

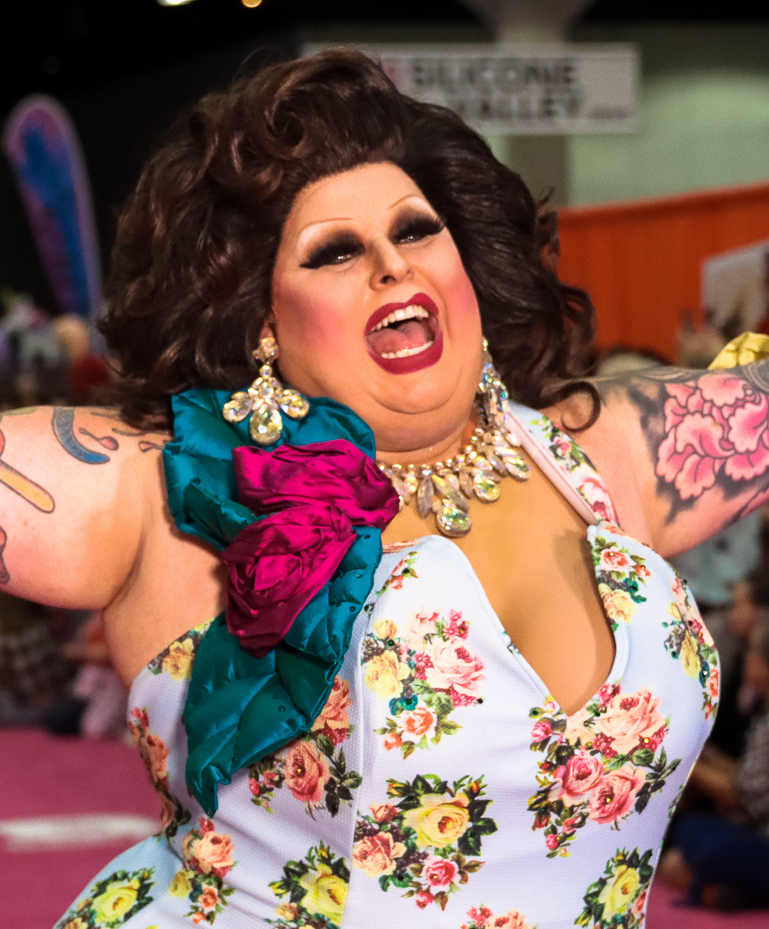
- Shield in 2023
- Born: Kristopher Elliot; 1 June 1974; Ballina, New South Wales, Australia
- Died: 21 February 2026 (aged 51); Sydney, New South Wales, Australia
- Television: RuPaul's Drag Race Down Under (season 1)
- Website: maxidragqueen.com

Kristopher Elliot (1 June 1974 – 21 February 2026), known professionally as Maxi Shield, was an Australian drag performer who competed on the first season of RuPaul's Drag Race Down Under.

== Early life ==
Kristopher Elliot was born in Ballina, New South Wales on 1 June 1974.

== Career ==
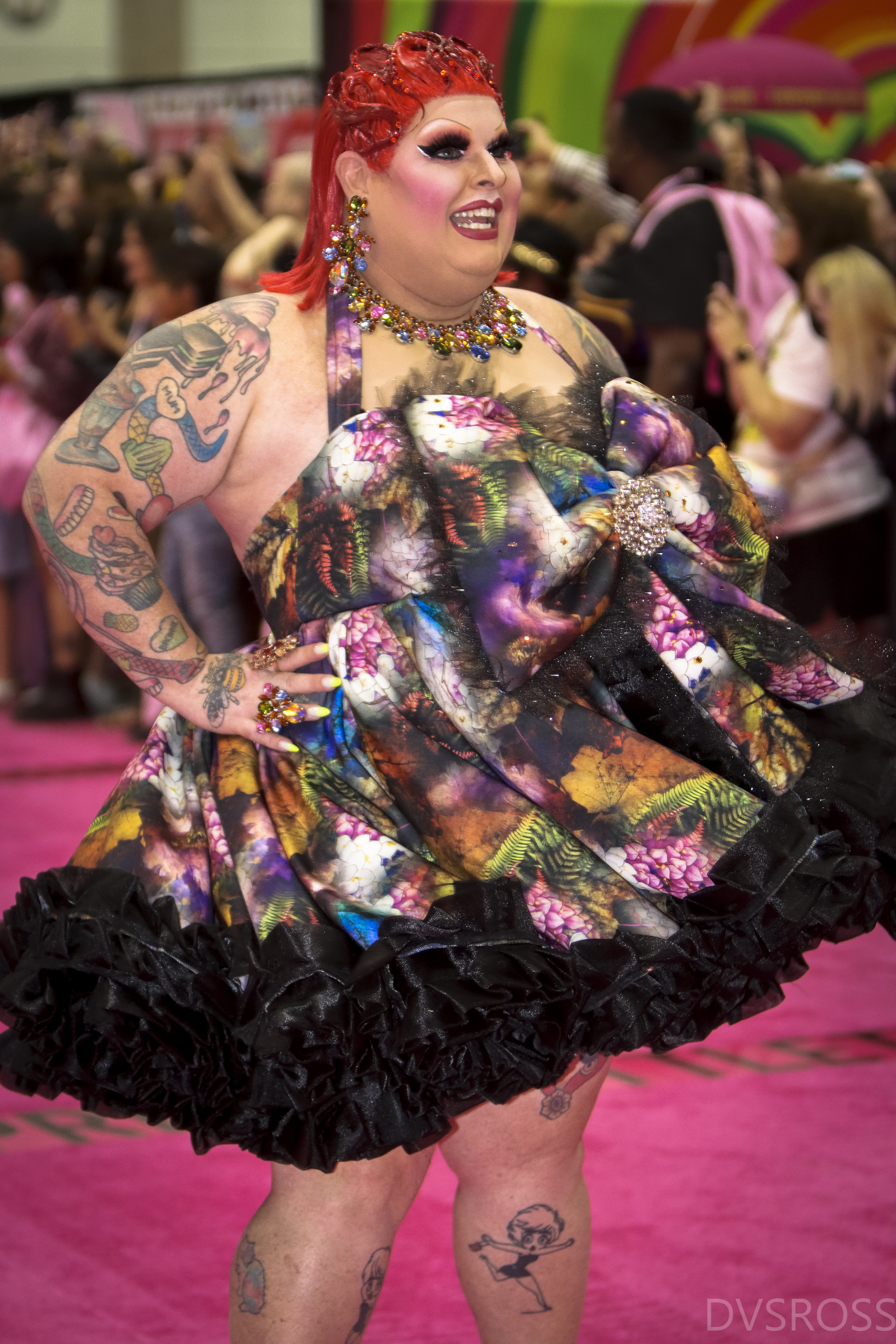
Maxi Shield at RuPaul's DragCon LA in May 2022

Maxi Shield performed at the 2000 Olympic Games closing ceremony and opened the Gay Games in 2002. She competed on the first season of RuPaul's Drag Race Down Under. She impersonated Magda Szubanski during the Snatch Game challenge. Maxi Shield was eliminated from the competition after placing in the bottom two of the make-over challenge, then losing a lip-sync battle against Scarlet Adams. She appeared at RuPaul's DragCon UK on numerous occasions after competing on Drag Race.

In 2020, Maxi Shield and fellow Drag Race contestant Hannah Conda attempted to set a new world record for the largest Drag Queen Story Time event at Oxtravaganza. In 2023, Maxi Shield played Maxine Fowler in the film The Winner Takes It All.

== Personal life and death ==
Elliot was based in Sydney and was an Oxford Street Safety Ambassador for the City of Sydney.

In 2017, Maxi Shield starred in a HIV prevention video campaign run by ACON titled "This HIV Testing Week, Testing Doesn't Have to Be a Drag". She was selected by ACON for this role due to being "tremendously talented" and highly recognisable by members of the Sydney LGBTQIA+ community, as well as her status as a community leader and role as Oxford Street Safety Ambassador. In 2022, Maxi participated in the "We're Better Than That" campaign to prevent domestic violence, having experienced it as a child.

In September 2025, Elliot announced that he had been diagnosed with throat cancer, for which he began receiving treatment. He died five months after being diagnosed, on 21 February 2026, at the age of 51.

== Filmography ==
=== Film ===
Year	Title	Role
2005	Going Down Under	Transvestite
2023	The Winner Takes It All	Maxine Fowler

=== Television ===
Year	Title	Role	Notes
2005	All Saints	Drag Queen	Episode: "Outside Looking In"
2018	You Can't Ask That	Herself	Episode: "Drag"
2021	RuPaul's Drag Race Down Under (season 1)	Herself (contestant)	6th place
2022	Bring Back My Girls	Herself	Episode: "RuPaul's Drag Race Down Under Season 1"
2023	Tongue Thai'd	Herself	Episode: "Maxi Shield at Crispy Pork Gang"
2024	Drag Race Down Under (season 4)	Herself (special guest)	Episode: "The Rhys Roast"

== See also ==
- List of people from Sydney
