= Nikita Iman =

Drag performer

Nikita Iman is a drag performer most known for competing on the fourth season of Drag Race Down Under as well as Drag Race Down Under vs. the World. She was born in Auckland and is based in Sydney.

== Filmography ==
- Drag Race Down Under (season 4)
- Drag Race Down Under vs. the World (2026)

== See also ==
- List of drag queens
- List of people from Sydney
