= List of people from Sydney =

This is a list of notable inhabitants of Sydney, New South Wales, Australia.

== Arts and entertainment ==
Name	Occupation	Notes
Milly Alcock	Actress	Known for the series House of the Dragon
Alex Apollonov	YouTuber	Engineer and comedian
Iggy Azalea	Rapper	Single "Fancy" reached number one on the Billboard Hot 100 in 2014 and held for seven consecutive weeks; born in Sydney in 1990
Bang Chan	K-pop idol	Leader, singer, rapper and producer of the Korean boy group Stray Kids; raised in Sydney
Courtney Barnett	Singer-songwriter and musician	Breakthrough Artist and Best Female Artist, 2015 ARIA Music Awards; Songwriter of the Year, 2016 APRA Music Awards; born in Sydney in 1987
Roxy Barton	Actress	Appeared on the London stage with the companies of F. R. Benson and Otho Stuart and Oscar Asche; born in Sydney in 1879
Natasha Bassett	Actress	Known for House by the Lake, The Pale Door, Desolate, and Spy Intervention; born in Sydney
Claudia Black	Actress and voice actress	Known for Farscape, Stargate SG-1, Pitch Black, and Uncharted; born in Sydney
Bryan Brown	Actor	Known for Breaker Morant, The Thorn Birds, Along Came Polly; born in Sydney in 1947
Rose Byrne	Actress	Known for Damages, Bridesmaids, Insidious; born in Balmain in 1979
Charles Coleman	Actor	Known for playing butlers/servants; born in Sydney in 1885
Toni Collette	Actress	Known for Muriel's Wedding, The Sixth Sense, United States of Tara; born in Blacktown in 1972
Matt Corby	Indie musician	Runner up on Australian Idol in 2007
Jai Courtney	Actor	Known for Jack Reacher, A Good Day to Die Hard, Terminator Genisys; born in Sydney in 1986
Russell Crowe	Actor	Known for L.A. Confidential, Gladiator, A Beautiful Mind; raised in Sydney
Morgan Davies	Actor	Known for the series One Piece and the horror film Evil Dead Rise
Ly de Angeles	Author	Author of books on witchcraft and tarot to magical realism; grew up in Sydney
Lillian Dean	Photographer	Known for photography and local government politician in Darwin; lived in Sydney
Alberto Domínguez	Radio personality	Uruguayan-born cyclist who became a radio personality for the Spanish service of SBS Radio. He died in 2001 on board American Airlines Flight 11 during the September 11 attacks in New York City
Claudia Doumit	Actress	Known for the series The Boys
Joel Edgerton	Actor	Known for Animal Kingdom, Warrior, The Gift; born in Blacktown in 1974
Indiana Evans	Actress, singer-songwriter	Known for Home and Away, H_{2}O: Just Add Water, Blue Lagoon: The Awakening; born in Sydney in 1990
Ania Freer	Documentary filmmaker	Known for Strictly Two Wheel, born in Sydney
Mel Gibson	Actor/director	Known for Mad Max, Lethal Weapon, Braveheart; moved to Sydney at age 12
Delta Goodrem	Singer	Single "Sitting on Top of the World" reached No.2 on ARIA Singles Chart, other notable single "Dear Life"; born in Sydney in 1984
Ann Howe	Newspaper proprietor	Ran a newspaper in the 1830s; born in Sydney c.1802, died 1842
Michael Hutchence	Musician and actor	Known as the lead singer and songwriter for Sydney rock band INXS from 1977 until 1997, born in Sydney in 1960, died in the Sydney suburb of Double Bay in 1997 of alleged suicide by hanging
Hugh Jackman	Actor	Known for X-Men, The Prestige, Les Misérables, The Greatest Showman, Real Steel; born in Sydney in 1968
Claudia Karvan	Actress	Known for The Secret Life of Us, Love My Way, Daybreakers; born in Sydney in 1972
Marlo Kelly	Actress	Known for Home and Away, Joe vs. Carole, Dare Me, 3 Body Problem
Miranda Kerr	Model	Victoria's Secret angel; born in Sydney in 1983
Nicole Kidman	Actress	Known for Eyes Wide Shut, Moulin Rouge!, The Hours; raised in Sydney
Felix Lee	K-pop idol	Part of the Korean boy group Stray Kids; born in Sydney in 2000
Keiynan Lonsdale	Actor, dancer, singer-songwriter	Known for The Flash, Dance Academy, Love, Simon; born in Sydney in 1991
Amy Lyons	Internet personality in China	Known for the "Chopstick Legs" video
James McGrath	Artist	Known for art exhibitions in New York City, London, Hong Kong, Sydney and Paris
Alex Proyas	Director	Known for The Crow, Dark City, I, Robot; raised in Sydney
Angourie Rice	Actress	Known for 2024 Mean Girls remake
Cybele Rowe	ceramicist	Known for monumental ceramic sculptures; born in Sydney
Eliza Scanlen	Actress	Known for the miniseries Sharp Objects and the 2019 movie Little Women
Sanu Sharma	Nepali-language author, novelist	Known for Ekadeshmaa, Utsarga, Pharak
Ann Shoebridge	milliner	Known for millinery; now lives in Sydney
Emma Swift	Singer-songwriter	Born in Sydney; now lives in Nashville, Tennessee
Rod Taylor	Actor	Known for The Time Machine, The Birds, One Hundred and One Dalmatians; born in Lidcombe in 1930
Jack Thompson	Actor	Known for The Club, Breaker Morant, The Man from Snowy River; born in Manly in 1940
Bud Tingwell	Actor	Known for King of the Coral Sea, Homicide, The Castle; born in Coogee in 1923
Terry Underwood	Author	Known for In The Middle of Nowhere and Riveren: My home, Our country; raised in Sydney
Brandon Vu	YouTuber	Professional Yoyo Player
Aleksa Vulović	YouTuber	Comedian
Pearlie Watling	Miner and folk musician	Australian shale miner, livestock farmer, sheep grazier and folk musician who played the piano accordion, born in Sydney in 1905
Naomi Watts	Actress	Known for Mulholland Drive, The Ring, King Kong; moved to Sydney at age 14
Jacki Weaver	Actress	Known for Alvin Purple, Animal Kingdom, Silver Linings Playbook; born in Sydney in 1947
Peter Weir	Director	Known for Picnic At Hanging Rock, The Last Wave, Dead Poets Society, The Truman Show; born in Sydney in 1944
David Wenham	Actor	Known for SeaChange, The Lord of the Rings, 300; born in Marrickville in 1965
Anthea Williams	Director	Known for Hir, Since Ali Died, Mother's Ruin: A Cabaret about Gin, Kill the Messenger, Safety Net
Angela White	Pornographic actress	Now lives in Los Angeles; born in Sydney in 1985
Rebel Wilson	Actress	Known for Pizza, Bogan Pride, Pitch Perfect; born in Sydney in 1980
Odessa Young	Actress	Known for the miniseries The Stand and the horror film The Damned

=== Musical groups ===
Name	Style	Notes
5 Seconds of Summer	Pop punk	Formed in Sydney in 2011, made up of Luke Hemmings, Ashton Irwin, Michael Clifford, Calum Hood; sold more than nine million album units, sold over two million concert tickets, while the band's songs streams surpass seven billion
AC/DC	Hard rock	Most successful Australian band having sold more than 200 million records worldwide, inducted into the ARIA Hall of Fame in 1988, inducted into the Rock and Roll Hall of Fame in 2003; formed in Sydney in 1973
Bliss n Eso	Hip hop	Formed in Sydney in 2000
The Cockroaches	Rock	Formed in Sydney in 1979
Divinyls	Pop rock	They have released five studio albums; four placed in the Top 10 Australian chart formed in Sydney in 1980
DMA's	Indie rock	Formed in Sydney in 2012 and have produced four albums
The Easybeats	Rock	Formed in Sydney in 1964
Empire of the Sun	Indie	Formed in Sydney in 2007
For King & Country	Contemporary Christian	Formed in Nashville in 2007; made up of two brothers (Joel and Luke Smallbone) from Sydney
Gang of Youths	Indie rock	Formed in Sydney in 2012
Gypsys Gift	Chamber pop	Formed in Sydney in 2011
Hoodoo Gurus	Rock	Formed in Sydney in 1981
Icehouse	New wave	Formed in Sydney in 1977 as "Flowers"; the group's name was changed to "Icehouse" (the title of their first album) in 1981
INXS	Rock	Sold more than 50 million records worldwide, inducted into the ARIA Hall of Fame in 2001; formed in Sydney in 1977
Mental As Anything	Rock	Formed in Sydney in 1976
Midnight Oil	Rock	Inducted into the ARIA Hall of Fame in 2006; formed in Sydney in 1976
Northlane	Metal	Formed in Sydney in 2009
PNAU	EDM	Formed in Sydney in 1999
Rüfüs Du Sol	EDM	Won the 2022 Grammy Award for Best Dance/Electronic Recording for their song "Alive" formed in Sydney in 2010
Sick Puppies	Rock	Formed in Sydney in 1997
Sons of the East	Indie folk	Formed in Sydney in 2011
The Vines	Hard rock	formed in Sydney in 1994
The Wiggles	Children's music	Inducted into the ARIA Hall of Fame in 2011; formed in Sydney in 1991
Wolfmother	Hard rock	Formed in Sydney in 2000
Youth Group	Rock	Formed in Sydney in 1996
Vince Melouney	Rock	Ex Bee Gees Member Band

== Politics ==
Name	Occupation	Notes
Anthony Albanese	Prime minister of Australia (2022-current)	
Edmund Barton	Prime minister of Australia (1901–1903)	
Inez Bensusan	Actress, playwright and suffragette in the UK	Leader of the Actresses' Franchise League and the Jewish League for Woman Suffrage
Bob Carr	Premier of New South Wales (1995–2005)	
Syd Einfeld	Politician and Jewish community leader	
John Howard	Prime minister of Australia (1996–2007)	
Morris Iemma	Premier of New South Wales (2005–2008)	
Paul Keating	Prime minister of Australia (1992–1996)	
Scott Morrison	Prime minister of Australia (2018-2022)	
Malcolm Turnbull	Prime minister of Australia (2015–2018)	
Gough Whitlam	Prime minister of Australia (1972–1975)	

== Science ==
Name	Occupation	Notes
Victor Chang	Cardiac surgeon	Pioneer of modern heart transplantation, appointed a Companion of the Order of Australia in 1986; moved to Sydney at age 14
Marguerite Henry	Zoologist	Described dozens of species; one of the first female zoologists in Australia
Sir Gustav Nossal	Research biologist	Known for his contributions to the fields of antibody formation and immunological tolerance
Ken Robinson	Computer scientist	Responsible for the first Unix system outside the United States in 1975; has been called the "father of formal methods in Australia"

== Sports ==
Name	Occupation	Notes
Costa Andricopoulos	Australian footballer	Born 1991
Jack Brabham	Formula One driver	The suburb of Brabham, Western Australia is named after him and features an estate development, also called Brabham, located on the former site of the Caversham Motor Raceway
Alex Chidiac	Soccer player for Australia	Born 1999
Billel Dib	Boxer	
Yahya El Hindi	Association football player	Represented Lebanon internationally
Matthew Farrelly	Professional wrestler	Also known under his ring name Grayson Waller; one half of the WWE Tag Team Championship, along with Austin Theory
Brad Fittler	Rugby league player	Captained Penrith Panthers, Sydney Roosters, NSW Blues, and Australia 1989–2004; born in Auburn in 1972
Kyrie Irving	National Basketball Association	Born 1992
Chloe Logarzo	Soccer player for Australia	Born 1994
Cassie MacIntosh	Professional wrestler	Also known by her ring name Peyton Royce
Mangok Mathiang	Basketball player	Hapoel Eilat of the Israeli Basketball Premier League
Jessie McKay	Professional wrestler	Also known by her ring name Billie Kay
Martin Nguyen	Mixed martial artist	
Ellyse Perry	Dual-international footballer and cricketer	Named ICC Female Cricketer of the Decade in 2020
Tatafu Polota-Nau	Rugby union player	
Steven Riches	Soccer player	
Tony Roche	Tennis player	Won the French Open in 1966; five-time Grand Slam singles finalist
Anne Rollo	Tennis player	
Amy Sayer	Soccer player for Australia	Born 2001
Jordan Spence	Ice hockey player	Drafted by the Los Angeles Kings in 2019, scored first NHL goal in March 2022
Mark Taylor	Cricketer	
Ian Thorpe	Swimmer	Gold medal winner at the 2000 Summer Olympics, and 2004 Summer Olympics; born in Sydney in 1982
Nathan Walker	Professional ice hockey player for the St Louis Blues of the NHL	Born in Cardiff, Wales but moved to Sydney at the age of 2
Mark Waugh	Cricketer	Played for NSW Blues, and Australia 1985–2002; born in Campsie in 1965
Steve Waugh	Cricketer	Captained NSW Blues, and Australia 1984–2004, named Australian of the Year in 2004, inducted into the Cricket Hall of Fame in 2010; born in Campsie in 1965
Lizzie Welborn	Ironwoman	
Kevin White	Darts player	
Todd Woodbridge	Tennis player	Inducted into the Australian Tennis Hall of Fame on January 26, 2010

== Other ==
Name	Occupation	Notes
Camille Agnes Becker Paul	Feminist, moral theologian and activist	
Beatrice Bligh	Gardener	
Jarrod Castaing	Landscape photographer	Known for photographing the Aurora Australis from Sydney's Northern Beaches in 2015
Marcus Einfeld	Superior court judge	
Brook Emery	Poet, educator	
Moshe Gutnick	Orthodox Chabad rabbi	
Frank Hurley	Photographer	Official photographer on Sir Ernest Shackleton's Imperial Trans-Antarctic Expedition in 1914
Clive James	Critic, journalist, broadcaster, writer and lyricist	The Clive James Show
Terry Kennedy	Speaker	At age 16, joined the Royal Australian Navy; earned Australian Service Medal at age 20
Milton Kent	Industrial and aerial photographer	Known for pioneering aerial photography in Sydney
Matthew Leveson	n/a	Killed in 2007
Peter Dodds McCormick	Composer, stonemason, teacher	Composer of "Advance Australia Fair", Australia's national anthem
Denis McFadden	Businessperson	Founder/CEO of "Just Cuts"
Michael Mobbs	Author and environmental consultant	
Eliza Pottie	Social reformer; active in suffrage, women's rights; co-founder of YWCA in Sydney	
Nicole Rogerson	Founding director and CEO of Autism Awareness Australia	
Anne-Marie Schwirtlich	Former director-general of the National Library of Australia	Member of the Order of Australia (AM)
Diana Shelstad	Mathematician	
Thomas Spohr	Solicitor and prosecutor	
Christopher Vincent Stanich	Master mariner, harbourmaster and waterfront controller	
Frances Ann Stewart	Social activist for women and children's rights	First female member of a New Zealand hospital board
Evelyn Strang	temperance leader and suffragist	President, Australian Woman's Christian Temperance Union
Christopher Wilder	Serial/spree killer and rapist	Murdered at least eight women and girls
John Yeomans	Journalist and author	

== See also ==
- Lists of Australians
