= Drag Race Down Under vs. the World =

New Zealand-Australian reality competition web television series

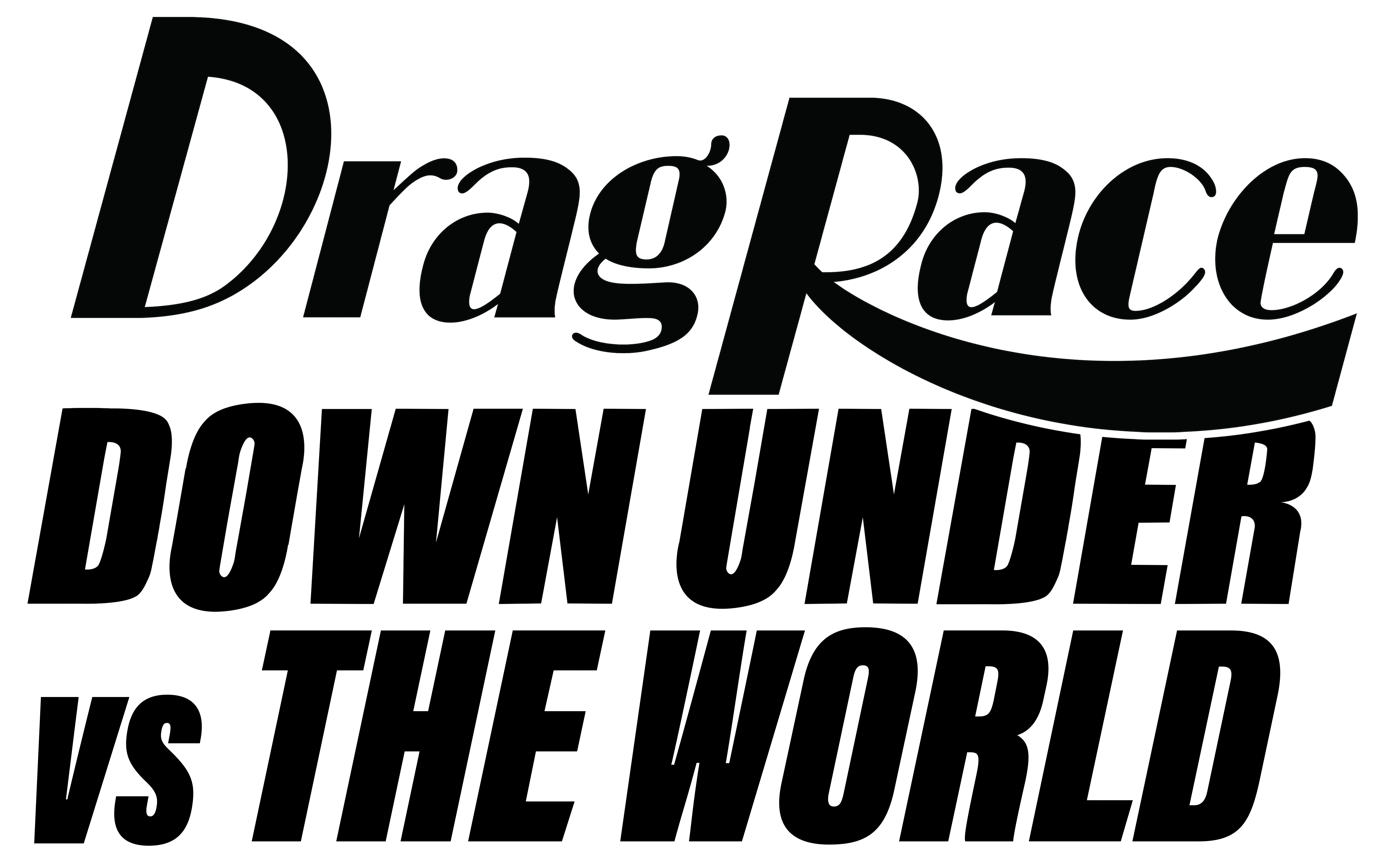
- Genre: Reality competition
- Based on: RuPaul's Drag Race
- Presented by: Michelle Visage
- Judges: Michelle Visage; Rhys Nicholson; Lazy Susan
- Theme music composer: RuPaul
- Opening theme: "RuPaul's Drag Race" theme
- Countries of origin: Australia; New Zealand
- Original language: English
- No. of seasons: 1
- No. of episodes: 8

Production
- Executive producers: RuPaul Charles; Fenton Bailey; Randy Barbato; Tom Campbell; Alicia Brown
- Camera setup: Multi-camera
- Running time: 60 minutes
- Production companies: World of Wonder; Stan

Original release
- Network: Stan (AU); WOW Presents Plus (NZ & International)
- Release: 24 July 2026 – present

Related
- Drag Race Down Under; RuPaul's Drag Race: UK vs. the World; Canada's Drag Race: Canada vs. the World; RuPaul's Drag Race Global All Stars; Drag Race Philippines: Slaysian Royale; Drag Race México: Latina Royale

Drag Race Down Under vs. the World is a spin-off of the television series Drag Race Down Under. Michelle Visage is the host and fellow panelists include comedian Rhys Nicholson and Drag Race Down Under season 4 winner Lazy Susan. The series premiered on 24 July 2026, on Stan in Australia and WOW Presents Plus elsewhere.

== Production ==
In August 2025, World of Wonder announced Drag Race Down Under vs. the World, a spinoff of Drag Race Down Under. Filming began in October 2025 in Lisbon, Portugal.

== Marketing ==
A teaser trailer was released on WOW Presents Plus social media in November 2025. The cast was announced on June 23, 2026.

== Contestants ==
Ages, names, and cities stated are at time of filming.

Contestants of Drag Race Down Under vs. the World season 1 and their backgrounds
| Contestant | Age | Hometown | Original season(s) | Original placement(s) | Outcome |
|---|---|---|---|---|---|
| Michael Marouli | 41 | Newcastle upon Tyne, United Kingdom | UK series 5 | Runner-up | Winner |
| Art Simone | 33 | Melbourne, Australia | Down Under season 1 | Runner-up | Runner-up |
| M1ss Jade So | 26 | Marikina, Philippines | Philippines season 2 | 3rd place | 3rd place |
| Vybe | 34 | Sydney, Australia | Down Under season 4 | Runner-up | 3rd place |
| LaLa Ri | 35 | Atlanta, United States | US season 13 | 10th place (Note: LaLa Ri was voted Miss Congeniality on her original season.) | 5th place |
| LaLa Ri | 35 | Atlanta, United States | All Stars 8 | 5th place (Note: LaLa Ri was voted Queen of the Fame Games on her All Stars 8 season.) | 5th place |
| Flor | 28 | Birmingham, United Kingdom | Down Under season 3 | 3rd place | 6th place |
| Coco Jumbo | 34 | Coffs Harbour, Australia | Down Under season 1 | 9th place | 7th place |
| Estrella Xtravaganza | 29 | Jerez de la Frontera, Spain | España season 2 | Runner-up | 8th place |
| Nikita Iman | 28 | Sydney, Australia | Down Under season 4 | 5th place | 9th place |
| Nicole Paige Brooks | 52 | Atlanta, United States | US season 2 | 11th place | 10th place (Note: Nicole Paige Brooks was voted Miss Congeniality by fellow contestants though it was never broadcast on the show itself.) |
| Nicole Paige Brooks | 52 | Atlanta, United States | All Stars 10 | 11th place | 10th place |
| Raven | 46 | Riverside, United States | US season 2 | Runner-up | —N/a (Note: Although she competed in episode 1, it was later revealed that Raven was actually "a mole" tasked to get to know the other contestants.) |
| Raven | 46 | Riverside, United States | All Stars 1 | Runner-up | —N/a |

== Contestant progress ==
Legend:

WIN indicates that the contestant won the challenge and the Lip Sync for the World.
TOP indicates that the contestant won the challenge, but lost the Lip Sync for the World.
SAFE indicates that the contestant was declared safe by the judges.
BTM (Bottom) indicates that the contestant was up for elimination.
ELIM (Eliminated) indicates that the contestant was eliminated.
Guest indicates that the contestant appeared as a guest.
MOLE indicates that at the beginning of episode 2, Raven was revealed to be a mole sent to get to know better the other contestants by Michelle Visage rather than an actual contestant.

Contestants progress with placements in each episode
| Contestant | Episode | | | | | | | |
| Contestant | 1 | 2 | 3 | 4 | 5 | 6 | 7 | 8 |
|---|---|---|---|---|---|---|---|---|
| Michael Marouli | WIN | SAFE | SAFE | SAFE | TOP2 | WIN | WIN | Winner |
| Art Simone | SAFE | WIN | WIN | TOP2 | SAFE | SAFE | TOP2 | Runner-up |
| M1ss Jade So | TOP2 | SAFE | SAFE | WIN | SAFE | TOP2 | BTM | Eliminated |
| Vybe | SAFE | SAFE | TOP2 | BTM | SAFE | BTM | BTM | Eliminated |
| LaLa Ri | BTM | SAFE | SAFE | SAFE | WIN | SAFE | ELIM | |
| Flor | BTM | TOP2 | BTM | SAFE | BTM | ELIM | | |
| Coco Jumbo | SAFE | BTM | SAFE | SAFE | ELIM | | | |
| Estrella Xtravaganza | SAFE | SAFE | SAFE | ELIM | | | | |
| Nikita Iman | SAFE | SAFE | ELIM | | | | | |
| Nicole Paige Brooks | SAFE | ELIM | | | | | | |
| Raven | SAFE | MOLE | | | | | | |

== Lip syncs ==
Legend:

The contestant was eliminated after their first time in the bottom.
The contestant was eliminated after their second time in the bottom.
The contestant was eliminated after their fourth time in the bottom.
The contestant won the Lip Sync for the Crown and was declared the winner of the season.

| Episode | Top Contestants (Elimination) | | | Song | Winner | Bottom | Eliminated |
|---|---|---|---|---|---|---|---|
| 1 | M1ss Jade So (Flor) | vs. | Michael Marouli (Flor) | "Melodrama" (Beks) | Michael Marouli | Flor, LaLa | None (Note: In episode 1, Michelle Visage announced that neither of the bottom two queens would be eliminated.) |
| 2 | Art Simone (Nicole) | vs. | Flor (Nicole) | "What Do I Have to Do" (Kylie Minogue) | Art Simone | Coco, Nicole | Nicole Paige Brooks |
| 3 | Art Simone (Nikita) | vs. | Vybe (Flor) | "Physical" (Dua Lipa) | Art Simone | Flor, Nikita | Nikita Iman |
| 4 | Art Simone (Estrella) | vs. | M1ss Jade So (Estrella) | "1999" (Charli XCX, Troye Sivan) | M1ss Jade So | Estrella, Vybe | Estrella Xtravaganza |
| 5 | LaLa Ri (Coco) | vs. | Michael Marouli (Coco) | "Devil Made Me Do It" (RuPaul) | LaLa Ri | Coco, Flor | Coco Jumbo |
| 6 | M1ss Jade So (N/A (Note: M1ss Jade So chose not to show who she chose to eliminate.)) | vs. | Michael Marouli (Flor) | "UK Hun?" (United Kingdolls) | Michael Marouli | Flor, Vybe | Flor |
| 7 | Art Simone (LaLa) | vs. | Michael Marouli (LaLa) | "Who Do You Think You Are" (Spice Girls) | Michael Marouli | LaLa, M1ss Jade, Vybe | LaLa Ri |
| Episode | Finalists | | | Song | Winner | | |
| 8 | Art Simone | vs. | Michael Marouli | "Adrenaline" (RuPaul ft. Myah Marie) | Michael Marouli | | |

== Guest judges ==
Listed in chronological order:

- Beks, Australian singer
- Raven, American drag queen and make-up artist, runner-up on both RuPaul's Drag Race season 2 and RuPaul's Drag Race All Stars season 1
- Markella Kavenagh, Australian actress
- Blu Hydrangea, Northern Irish drag queen, winner of RuPaul's Drag Race: UK vs. the World series 1 and contestant on RuPaul's Drag Race UK series 1
- Keiynan Lonsdale, Australian actor, dancer and singer-songwriter
- Lawrence Chaney, Scottish drag queen, winner of RuPaul's Drag Race UK series 2
- Josh Cavallo, Australian professional soccer player

=== Special guests ===
Guests who appeared in episodes, but did not judge on the main stage.

Episode 7

- Norvina, president of Anastasia Beverly Hills

Episode 8

- Tuxa, choreographer

== Episodes ==
| No. overall | No. in season | Title | Original release date |
|---|---|---|---|
| 1 | 1 | "Look Who's Back in the House!" | 24 July 2026 |
Eleven queens from across the Drag Race franchise enter the competition. For the first main challenge, the queens create an outfit made out of an assigned fabric.: Art Simone – Leopard Print Satin; Coco Jumbo – Metallic Pistachio Lycra; Estrella Xtravaganza – Chartreuse Tricot; Flor – Holographic Rainbow Plisse Satin; LaLa Ri – Floral Sequin; M1ss Jade So – Metallic Red Lycra; Michael Marouli – Velvet Tiger Print; Nicole Paige Brooks – Gray Faux Fur; Nikita Iman – Red Crushed Velvet; Raven – Blue Stretch Denim; VYBE – Black and White Mod Cotton; On the runway, category is DIY Divas. M1ss Jade So, Michael Marouli and VYBE receive positive critiques, with M1ss Jade So and Michael Marouli being announced as the top two. Estrella Xtravaganza, Flor and LaLa Ri receive negative critiques, with Flor and LaLa Ri being announced as the bottom two. M1ss Jade So and Michael Marouli lip-sync to "Melodrama" by Beks. Michael Marouli wins the lip-sync. After the lip-sync, Michelle Visage announces that no one will be going home.: Guest Judge: Beks; Main Challenge: Create an outfit made out of an assigned fabric; Runway Theme: DIY Divas; Challenge Winners: M1ss Jade So and Michael Marouli; Lip-Sync Song: "Melodrama" by Beks; Lip-Sync for The World Winner: Michael Marouli; Lip-Sync for The World Winner Prize: A $3,000 cash tip; Bottom Two: Flor and LaLa Ri; Eliminated: None
| 2 | 2 | "Better The Diva You Know" | 31 July 2026 |
At the beginning of the episode, M1ss Jade So and Michael Marouli both reveal that they would have sent home Flor from the competition, had there been an elimination. For this week's main challenge, the queens write, record, and perform verses to "Kylie, Disco Goddess" and "Kylie, Princess of Pop". Michelle Visage then reveals to the queens that Raven will not be competing this season, and that she was a mole. She then reveals that Raven will be this week's guest judge.: Team Charlene's Angels - Art Simone, Coco Jumbo, LaLa Ri, Nicole Paige Brooks and Nikita Iman performing "Kylie, Princess of Pop"; Team Kye-Kylies - Estrella Xtravaganza, Flor, M1ss Jade So, Michael Marouli and VYBE performing "Kylie, Disco Goddess"; On the runway, category is Forever Kylie. Art Simone, Estrella Xtravaganza and Flor receive positive critiques, with Art Simone and Flor being announced as the top two. Coco Jumbo, Nicole Paige Brooks and Nikita Iman receive negative critiques, with Coco Jumbo and Nicole Paige Brooks being announced as the bottom two. Art Simone and Flor lip-sync to "What Do I Have to Do" by Kylie Minogue. Art Simone wins the lip-sync and decides to eliminate Nicole Paige Brooks from the competition.: Mole/Guest Judge: Raven; Main Challenge: Write, record, and perform verses to "Kylie, Disco Goddess" and "Kylie, Princess of Pop"; Runway Theme: Forever Kylie; Challenge Winners: Art Simone and Flor; Lip-Sync Song: "What Do I Have to Do" by Kylie Minogue; Lip-Sync for The World Winner: Art Simone; Lip-Sync for The World Winner Prize: A $3,000 cash tip; Bottom Two: Coco Jumbo and Nicole Paige Brooks; Eliminated: Nicole Paige Brooks; Farewell Message: "Nicole Paige Brooks F.A.G."
| 3 | 3 | "Whose Wig Is It Anyway?" | 7 August 2026 |
The queens enter the workroom and Flor reveals she would have sent home Nicole Paige Brooks from the competition, had she won the lip-sync. For this week's main challenge, the queens play the Snatch Game. Lazy Susan and Markella Kavenagh star as the celebrity contestants. The cast consisted of: Art Simone as Jane Turner (as Kath Day-Knight from Kath & Kim); Coco Jumbo as Barry White; Estrella Xtravaganza as Charo; Flor as Rowan Atkinson (as Mr. Bean from the TV show of the same name); LaLa Ri as Rick James; M1ss Jade So as the Universe (credited as the Un1verse); Michael Marouli as Tim Curry (as Dr. Frank-N-Furter from The Rocky Horror Picture Show movie); Nikita Iman as Mary Jane; VYBE as Bette Midler; On the runway, category is Tropical Fruit. Art Simone, Coco Jumbo and VYBE receive positive critiques, with Art Simone and VYBE being announced as the top two. Flor, M1ss Jade So and Nikita Iman receive negative critiques, with Flor and Nikita Iman being announced as the bottom two. Art Simone and VYBE lip-sync to "Physical" by Dua Lipa. Art Simone wins the lip-sync and decides to eliminate Nikita Iman from the competition.: Guest Judge: Markella Kavenagh; Main Challenge: Snatch Game; Runway Theme: Tropical Fruit; Challenge Winners: Art Simone and VYBE; Lip-Sync Song: "Physical" by Dua Lipa; Lip-Sync for The World Winner: Art Simone; Lip-Sync for The World Winner Prize: A $3,000 cash tip; Bottom Two: Flor and Nikita Iman; Eliminated: Nikita Iman; Farewell Message: "Nothing But to my Sisters Old and New! Dont worry, This Pussy will always Pop Severly xo"
| 4 | 4 | "Franken-Drag" | 14 August 2026 |
The queens enter the workroom and VYBE reveals she would have sent home Flor from the competition, had she won the lip-sync. For this week's main challenge, the queens pair up and create an outfit using two look brought from home and one look brought by their partners. The pairs consisted of: Art Simone and Estrella Xtravaganza; Coco Jumbo and VYBE; Flor and M1ss Jade So; LaLa Ri and Michael Marouli; On the runway, category is Franken-Drag Eleganza. Art Simone, Michael Marouli and M1ss Jade So receive positive critiques, with Art Simone and M1ss Jade So being announced as the top two. Estrella Xtravaganza, LaLa Ri and VYBE receive negative critiques, with Estrella Xtravaganza and VYBE being announced as the bottom two. Art Simone and M1ss Jade So lip-sync to "1999" by Charli XCX and Troye Sivan. M1ss Jade So wins the lip-sync and decides to eliminate Estrella Xtravaganza from the competition.: Guest Judge: Blu Hydrangea; Main Challenge: Create an outfit using two looks you brought from home and one look brought by your partner; Runway Theme: Franken-Drag Eleganza; Challenge Winners: Art Simone and M1ss Jade So; Lip-Sync Song: "1999" by Charli XCX and Troye Sivan; Lip-Sync for The World Winner: M1ss Jade So; Lip-Sync for The World Winner Prize: A $3,000 cash tip; Bottom Two: Estrella Xtravaganza and VYBE; Eliminated: Estrella Xtravaganza; Farewell Message:
| 5 | 5 | "Rappin’ Roast" | 21 August 2026 |
The queens enter the workroom and Art Simone reveals she would have sent home Estrella Xtravaganza from the competition, had she won the lip-sync. For this week's main challenge, the queens perform in the Rappin' Roast, where they write and perform verses roasting each other and perform in front of the judges. On the runway, category is Diamonds Are A Queen's Best Friend. LaLa Ri, Michael Marouli and VYBE receive positive critiques, with LaLa Ri and Michael Marouli being announced as the top two. Art Simone, Coco Jumbo and Flor receive negative critiques, with Coco Jumbo and Flor being announced as the bottom two. LaLa Ri and Michael Marouli lip-sync to "Devil Made Me Do It" by RuPaul. LaLa Ri wins the lip-sync and decides to eliminate Coco Jumbo from the competition.: Guest Judge: Keiynan Lonsdale; Main Challenge: Write and perform verses roasting each other and perform in front of the judges; Runway Theme: Diamonds Are A Queen's Best Friend; Challenge Winners: LaLa Ri and Michael Marouli; Lip-Sync Song: "Devil Made Me Do It" by RuPaul; Lip-Sync for The World Winner: LaLa Ri; Lip-Sync for The World Winner Prize: A $3,000 cash tip; Bottom Two: Coco Jumbo and Flor; Eliminated: Coco Jumbo; Farewell Message:
| 6 | 6 | "House of Whores - A Trilogy of Terror" | 28 August 2026 |
| 7 | 7 | "Beach Buddies Makeover" | 4 September 2026 |
| 8 | 8 | "She's Crowning" | 11 September 2026 |
