= Etcetera Etcetera =

Australian drag performer

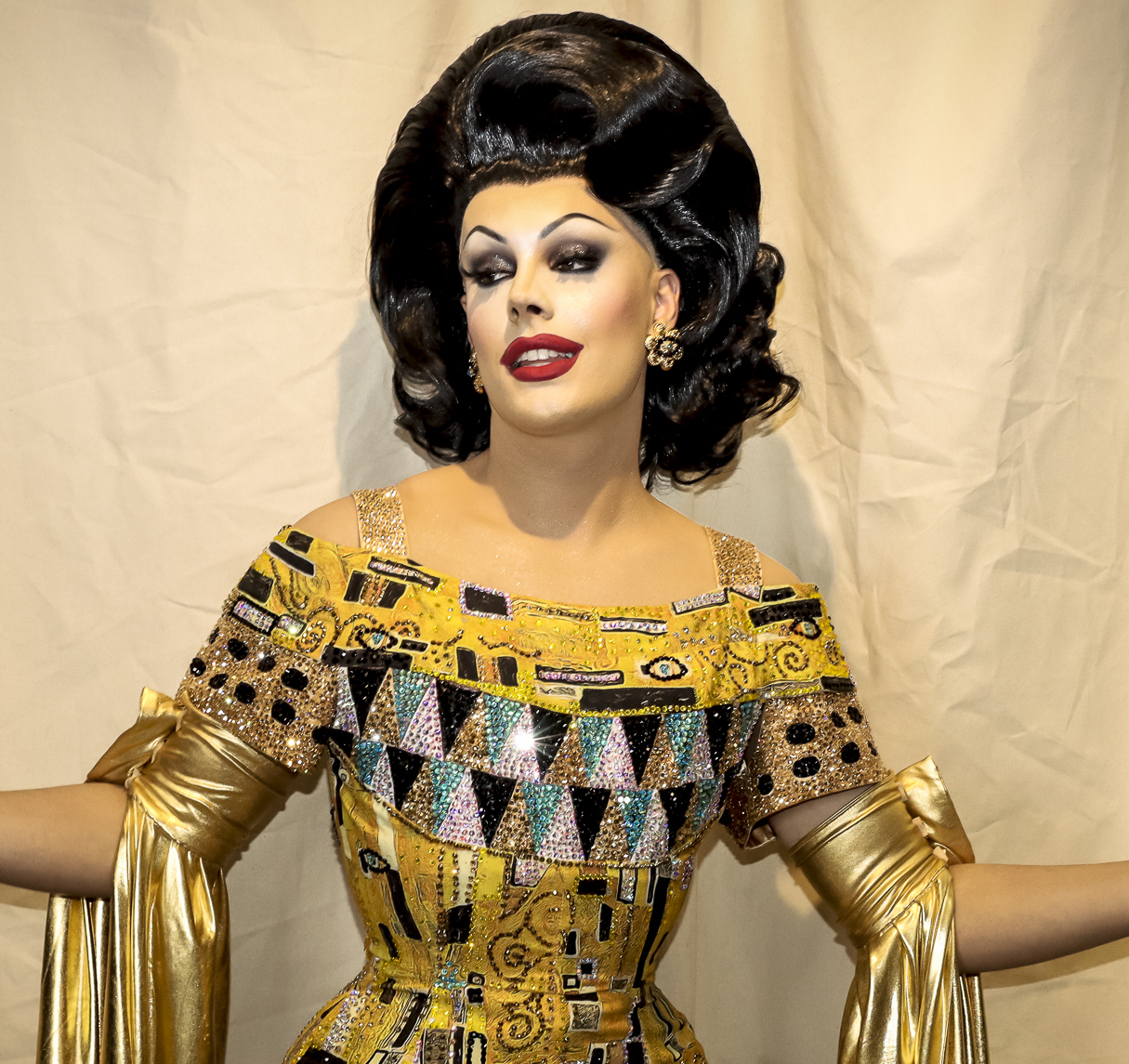
- Etcetera Etcetera at RuPaul's DragCon LA, 2022
- Born: Oliver Levi-Malouf
- Education: Daramalan College
- Occupation: Drag queen
- Website: glamourbug.com

Etcetera Etcetera is the stage name of Oliver Levi-Malouf, an Australian drag queen who competed on season 1 of RuPaul's Drag Race Down Under.

== Education ==
Levi-Malouf attended Daramalan College.

== Career ==
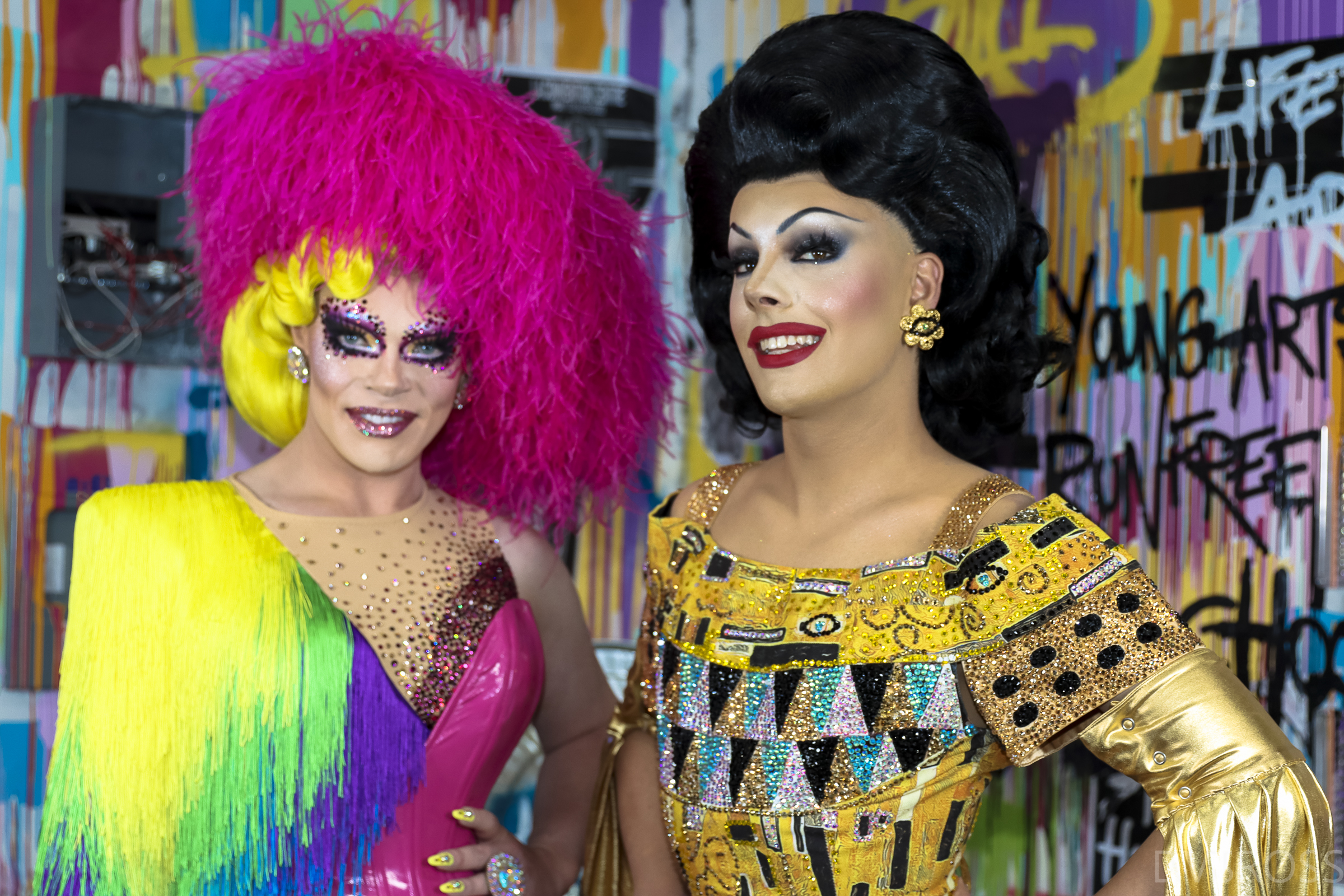
Art Simone (left) and Etcetera Etcetera (right) at RuPaul's DragCon LA in 2022; the two have toured together.

Etcetera Etcetera competed on season 1 of RuPaul's Drag Race Down Under. She was the first contestant of Lebanese descent. She impersonated Lindy Chamberlain-Creighton for the Snatch Game challenge, something many fans found insensitive. Etcetera Etcetera was the fourth contestant to be eliminated from the competition.

Etcetera Etcetera was slated to tour with her fellow Drag Race contestants, but pulled out because of another participant. She toured with Art Simone, in a show called As Seen on TV. Etcetera Etcetera has also been described as the curator of the queer venue known as The Imperial Erskineville.

== Personal life ==
Etcetera Etcetera is based in Sydney, and identifies as non-binary trans and bisexual.

== Filmography ==
=== Film ===
Year	Title	Role
2021	So Vam	Fortune Teller
2023	T Blockers	

=== Television ===
Year	Title	Role	Notes
2021	RuPaul's Drag Race Down Under	Herself	Contestant (7th place)
2022	Bring Back My Girls	Herself (guest)	1 episode

=== Web series ===
Year	Title	Role	Notes
2022	Hi Jinkx! with Jinkx Monsoon	Herself	
