= John Yeomans =

John Yeomans may refer to:

- John Yeomans (writer), Australian journalist and writer
- John William Yeomans, Presbyterian pastor and president of Lafayette College
