= Karna Ford =

Drag performer

- Born: Erick Polinar
- Occupation: Drag performer
- Television: Drag Race Down Under (season 4)

Karna Ford is the stage name of Erick Polinar, an Australian drag performer who competed on the fourth season of Drag Race Down Under.

== Career ==
Prior to Drag Race, Karna Ford appeared on NCIS: Sydney and in a music video for Jessica Mauboy's "Right Here Right Now".

Karna Ford competed on the fourth season of Drag Race Down Under. On the third episode, she portrayed Eddie Murphy's fictional drag alter-ego Eddiesha Knowles Carter Murphy III for the Snatch Game challenge. She was eliminated from the competition after placing in the bottom three and losing a lip-sync contest against Max Drag Queen and Nikita Iman. Karna Ford placed ninth overall.

== Personal life ==
Karna Ford is of Filipino descent, and is the first contestant of Filipino ancestry to compete on Drag Race Down Under.

== Filmography ==
- NCIS: Sydney
- Drag Race Down Under (season 4; 2024)
