= Coco Jumbo =

Australian drag performer

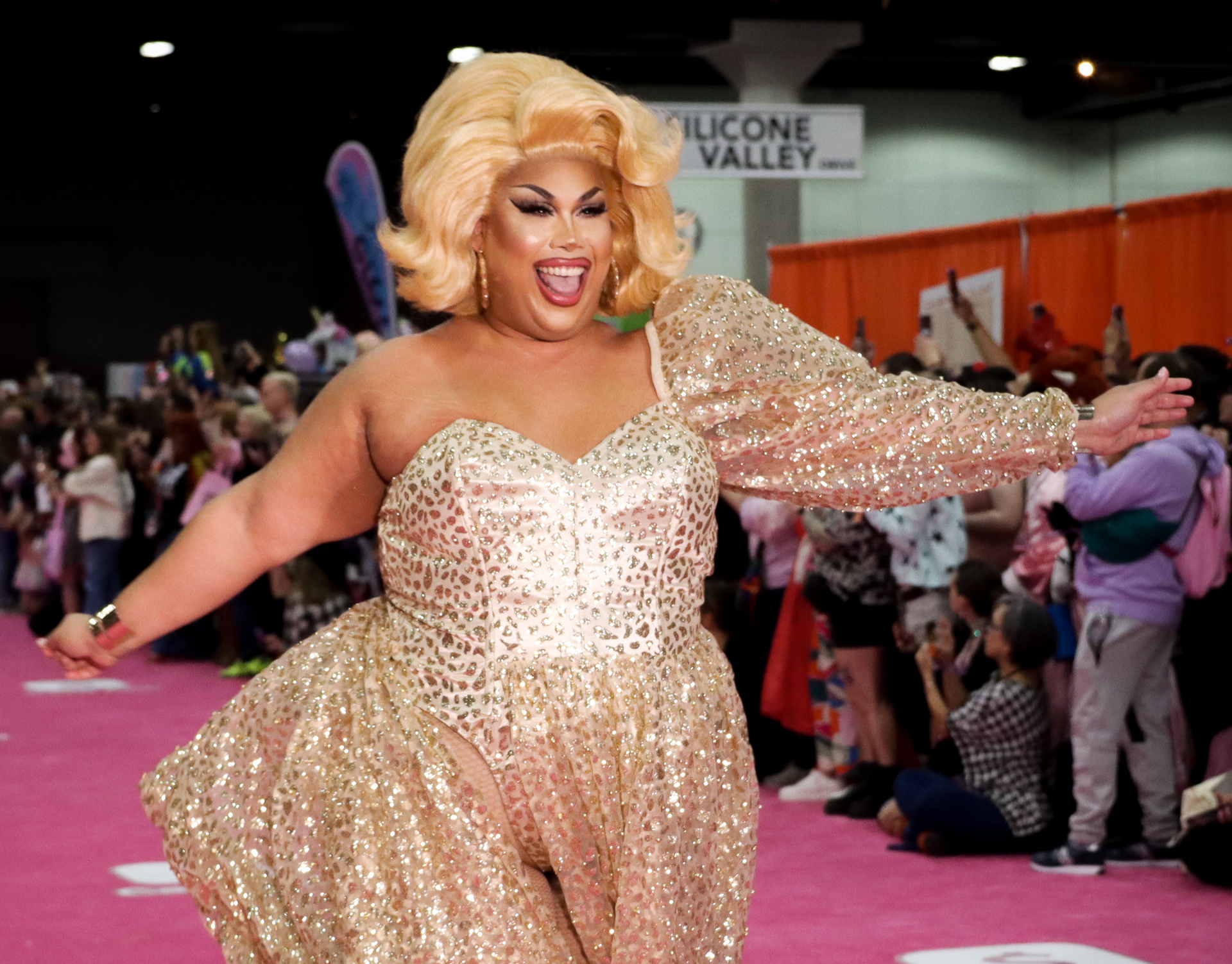
- Coco Jumbo at RuPaul's DragCon LA, 2023
- Born: Luke Vito
- Television: RuPaul's Drag Race Down Under (season 1)

Coco Jumbo is the stage name of Luke Vito, a Fijian-Australian drag performer who competed on season 1 of RuPaul's Drag Race Down Under and Drag Race Down Under vs. the World.

== Career ==
Coco Jumbo was named DIVA Entertainer of the Year 2017. She competed on season 1 of RuPaul's Drag Race Down Under. She impersonated Lizzo for the Snatch Game challenge, and beat Art Simone in a lip sync. Coco Jumbo placed eighth overall.

== Personal life ==
Coco Jumbo is based in Sydney. She has been credited for rescuing a man from a homophobic attack while she was in drag.

== Filmography ==
=== Film ===
- We All Lie My Darling (2021)

=== Television ===
- RuPaul's Drag Race Down Under (season 1, 2021)
- Drag Race Down Under vs. The World (2026)
