= Vybe =

Australian drag performer

- Born: Angus Roberts
- Occupation: Drag performer
- Television: Drag Race Down Under (season 4)

Vybe is the stage name of Angus Roberts, an Australian drag performer competing on the fourth season of Drag Race Down Under and Drag Race Down Under vs. the World.

== Career ==
Vybe is a drag performer who was named DIVA Rising Star for 2023. She is competing on the fourth season of Drag Race Down Under.

== Personal life ==
Roberts is based in Sydney and uses the pronouns she/her in drag and he/him out of drag.

Vybe's drag sister is Coco Jumbo.

== Filmography ==
- Drag Race Down Under (season 4; 2024)
- Drag Race Down Under vs. the World (2026)

== See also ==
- List of drag queens
- List of people from Sydney
