= Drag Race Down Under season 4 =

2024 season of Drag Race Down Under

Drag Race Down Under
- Season 4
- Promotional poster for season four
- Hosted by: Michelle Visage
- Judges: Michelle Visage; Rhys Nicholson; Isis Avis Loren; Kita Mean; Spankie Jackzon
- No. of contestants: 10
- Winner: Lazy Susan
- Runners-up: Mandy Moobs; Vybe
- No. of episodes: 8

Release
- Original network: Stan (Australia); TVNZ+ (New Zealand); WOW Presents Plus (International)
- Original release: 1 November – 20 December 2024

Season chronology
- ← Previous; Season 3

The fourth season of Drag Race Down Under premiered on 1 November 2024, through Stan in Australia and on WOW Presents Plus internationally.

On 11 March 2024, it was officially announced that RuPaul would be stepping down as host, with Michelle Visage taking over as host and Rhys Nicholson remaining on the panel. This year, it was announced that the previous winners of Drag Race Down Under, Kita Mean, Spankie Jackzon and Isis Avis Loren would become permanent rotating judges.

It was also announced that various Down Under alum would appear as guests throughout the season.

== Background ==
The fourth season of Drag Race Down Under aired in 2024. Michelle Visage replaced RuPaul as host. Rhys Nicholson remained a permanent judge, and the season featured guest judges and former contestants from the series. RuPaul continued to be an executive producer. According to Variety, the show's name was changed from "RuPaul's Drag Race Down Under" to "Drag Race Down Under".

== Contestants ==
Ages, names, and cities stated are at time of filming.

Contestant	Age	Hometown	Outcome
Lazy Susan	32	Melbourne, Australia	Winner
Mandy Moobs	33	Brisbane, Australia	Runners-up
Vybe	32	Sydney, Australia	Runners-up
Freya Armani	24	Brisbane, Australia	4th place
Nikita Iman	27	Auckland, New Zealand	5th place
Max Drag Queen	24	Melbourne, Australia	6th place
Brenda Bressed	24	Melbourne, Australia	7th place
Lucina Innocence	28	Auckland, New Zealand	8th place
Karna Ford	27	Sydney, Australia	9th place
Olivia Dreams	26	Wellington, New Zealand	10th place

== Contestant progress ==
Legend:

Lazy Susan won Drag Race Down Under season 4.
Mandy Moobs and Vybe were the runners-up.
WIN indicates that the contestant won the challenge.
SAFE indicates that the contestant was declared safe by the judges.
BTM (Bottom) indicates that the contestant was up for elimination.
ELIM (Eliminated) indicates that the contestant was eliminated.

Contestants progress with placements in each episode
Contestant	Episode							
Contestant	1	2	3	4	5	6	7	8
Lazy Susan	WIN	WIN	SAFE	SAFE	SAFE	WIN	SAFE	Winner
Mandy Moobs	SAFE	SAFE	SAFE	WIN	SAFE	SAFE	BTM	Runner-up
Vybe	SAFE	SAFE	SAFE	SAFE	WIN	SAFE	WIN	Runner-up
Freya Armani	SAFE	SAFE	SAFE	BTM	SAFE	SAFE	SAFE	Eliminated
Nikita Iman	SAFE	SAFE	BTM	SAFE	WIN	BTM	ELIM	
Max Drag Queen	SAFE	SAFE	BTM	SAFE	BTM	ELIM		
Brenda Bressed	SAFE	SAFE	WIN	SAFE	ELIM			
Lucina Innocence	BTM	BTM	SAFE	ELIM				
Karna Ford	BTM	SAFE	ELIM					
Olivia Dreams	SAFE	ELIM						

== Lip syncs ==
Legend:

The contestant was eliminated after their first time in the bottom.
The contestant was eliminated after their second time in the bottom.
The contestant was eliminated after their third time in the bottom.
The contestant won the Lip Sync for the Crown and was declared the winner of the season.

Episode	Bottom contestants			Song	Eliminated
1	Karna Ford	vs.	Lucina Innocence	"Rush" (Troye Sivan)	None
2	Lucina Innocence	vs.	Olivia Dreams	"Freefallin" (Zoë Badwi)	Olivia Dreams
3	Karna Ford vs. Max Drag Queen vs. Nikita Iman			"My Delirium" (Ladyhawke)	Karna Ford
4	Freya Armani	vs.	Lucina Innocence	"What About Me" (Moving Pictures)	Lucina Innocence
5	Brenda Bressed	vs.	Max Drag Queen	"Like a Girl Does" (Peach PRC)	Brenda Bressed
6	Max Drag Queen	vs.	Nikita Iman	"Talking Body" (Tove Lo)	Max Drag Queen
7	Mandy Moobs	vs.	Nikita Iman	"Searchin'" (Young Divas)	Nikita Iman
Episode	Finalists			Song	Winner
8	Lazy Susan vs. Mandy Moobs vs. Vybe			"Came Here for Love" (Sigala, Ella Eyre)	Lazy Susan

== Guest judges ==
Listed in chronological order:

- Sasha Colby, American drag performer, beauty pageant competitor and winner of RuPaul's Drag Race season 15
- Kween Kong, New Zealand-Australian drag performer and contestant on season 2 and RuPaul's Drag Race Global All Stars
- Ladyhawke, New Zealand singer-songwriter and multi-instrumentalist
- G Flip, Australian singer, songwriter, multi-instrumentalist and producer
- Peach PRC, Australian pop singer, songwriter, and social media personality
- Matthew Okine, Australian stand-up comedian, author and radio presenter
- Anita Wigl'it, New Zealand drag performer and contestant on season 1 and Canada's Drag Race: Canada vs. the World season 1
- Sophie Monk, Australian singer, actress, television personality, and model

=== Special guests ===
Guests who appeared in episodes, but did not judge on the main stage.

Episode 6

- Hannah Conda, Australian drag performer and runner-up of both season 2 and RuPaul's Drag Race: UK vs. The World series 2

Episode 7

- Maxi Shield, Australian drag performer and contestant on season 1

Episode 8

- Elektra Shock, New Zealand drag performer and contestant on season 1

== Episodes ==
No. overall	No. in season	Title	Original release date
25	1	"Doubling Down"	1 November 2024
Ten new queens enter the werkroom. For the main challenge, the queens present two looks for The Double Down Ball: Double Dressin' and Double Dippin'.: Blue - Lucina Innoncence and Mandy Moobs; Gold - Freya Armani and Max Drag Queen; Orange - Nikita Iman and Vybe; Purple - Lazy Susan and Olivia Dreams; Red - Brenda Bressed and Karna Ford; On the runway, Lazy Susan, Max Drag Queen and Nikita Iman receive positive critiques, with Lazy Susan winning the challenge. Karna Ford, Lucina Innocence and Olivia Dreams receive negative critiques, with Olivia Dreams being safe. Karna Ford and Lucina Innocence lip-sync to "Rush" by Troye Sivan. Both queens win the lip-sync and no one goes home.: Guest Judge: Sasha Colby; Alternating Coach: Isis Avis Loren; Main Challenge: The Double Down Ball; Runway Theme: Double Dressin' and Double Dippin'; Challenge Winner: Lazy Susan; Challenge Prize: A $3,000 cash tip courtesy of TEAMM8; Bottom Two: Karna Ford and Lucina Innocence; Lip-Sync Song: "Rush" by Troye Sivan; Eliminated: None
26	2	"Mr. Right or Mr. Right Now?"	8 November 2024
For this week's main challenge, the queens write, record, and perform verses to "Mr. Right" and "Mr. Right Now?".: Team Mr. Right - Brenda Bressed, Karna Ford, Lazy Susan, Max Drag Queen and Olivia Dreams; Team Mr. Right Now? - Freya Armani, Lucina Innocence, Mandy Moobs, Nikita Iman and Vybe; On the runway, category is Sheer Genius. Brenda Bressed, Lazy Susan and Vybe receive positive critiques, with Lazy Susan winning the challenge. Freya Armani, Lucina Innocence and Olivia Dreams receive negative critiques, with Freya Armani being safe. Lucina Innocence and Olivia Dreams lip-sync to "Freefallin" by Zoë Badwi. Lucina Innocence wins the lip-sync and Olivia Dreams is the first queen to sashay away.: Guest Judge: Kween Kong; Alternating Coach: Isis Avis Loren; Main Challenge: Write, record, and perform verses to "Mr. Right" and "Mr. Right Now?"; Runway Theme: Sheer Genius; Challenge Winner: Lazy Susan; Challenge Prize: A 65 inch TV courtesy of Samsung; Bottom Two: Lucina Innocence and Olivia Dreams; Lip-Sync Song: "Freefallin" by Zoë Badwi; Eliminated: Olivia Dreams; Farewell Message: "It's been an honor to meet you all, you are all so fierce and talented. Remember to LIV, laugh, and love ❤️ #WINNERSEDIT"
27	3	"Snatch Me"	15 November 2024
For the main challenge, the queens play the Snatch Game. Kita Mean and Rhys Nicholson star as the celebrity contestants. The cast consisted of: Brenda Bressed as Gina Riley; Freya Armani as Mrs. Claus; Karna Ford as Eddie Murphy; Lazy Susan as Lindsay Lohan; Lucina Innocence as Tabatha Coffey; Mandy Moobs as Jane Turner; Max Drag Queen as Reese Witherspoon; Nikita Iman as Mother Nature; Vybe as Julia Child; On the runway, category is Queen of the Dessert. Brenda Bressed, Mandy Moobs and Vybe receive positive critiques, with Brenda Bressed winning the challenge. Karna Ford, Max Drag Queen and Nikita Iman receive negative critiques and are announced as the bottom three. They lip-sync to "My Delirium" by Ladyhawke. Max Drag Queen and Nikita Iman win the lip-sync and Karna Ford sashays away.: Guest Judge: Ladyhawke; Alternating Coach: Kita Mean; Main Challenge: I'm a Celebrity Impersonator – Snatch Me Outta Here!; Runway Theme: Queen of the Dessert; Challenge Winner: Brenda Bressed; Challenge Prize: A Necklace set from Amped Accessories; Bottom Three: Karna Ford, Max Drag Queen and Nikita Iman; Lip-Sync Song: "My Delirium" by Ladyhawke; Eliminated: Karna Ford; Farewell Message: "MABUHEY BAKLAS! I'm so proud to ha been in a cast with such talented queens. My DRAG RACE journey may have just ended but the real race only just begin for me so I let you all know... You all suck 💋 LOVE YOU ALL!"
28	4	"Fierce Fabulous Fashion"	22 November 2024
For the main challenge, the queens create an outfit made out of an assigned fabric.: Brenda Bressed - Tie-Dye; Freya Armani - Kitty Girl; Lazy Susan - Pleather; Lucina Innocence - Florals; Mandy Moobs - Lamé; Max Drag Queen - Checkered; Nikita Iman - Denim; Vybe - Sequins; On the runway, category is Fierce Fabulous Fashion. Mandy Moobs, Nikita Iman and Vybe receive positive critiques, with Mandy Moobs winning the challenge. Brenda Bressed, Freya Armani and Lucina Innocence receive negative critiques, with Brenda Bressed being safe. Freya Armani and Lucina Innocence lip-sync to "What About Me" by Moving Pictures. Freya Armani wins the lip-sync and Lucina Innocence sashays away.: Guest Judge: G Flip; Alternating Coach: Isis Avis Loren; Main Challenge: Create an outfit made out of an assigned fabric; Runway Theme: Fierce Fabulous Fashion; Challenge Winner: Mandy Moobs; Challenge Prize: A $2,000 gift voucher to Shoe Me; Bottom Two: Freya Armani and Lucina Innocence; Lip-Sync Song: "What About Me" by Moving Pictures; Eliminated: Lucina Innocence; Farewell Message:
29	5	"Booked and Beautiful"	29 November 2024
For this week's mini-challenge, the queens read each other to filth. Vybe wins the mini-challenge. For the main challenge, the queens makeover librarians. On the runway, category is Drag Family Storytime. Freya Armani, Nikita Iman and Vybe receive positive critiques, with Nikita Iman and Vybe both winning the challenge. Brenda Bressed, Mandy Moobs and Max Drag Queen receive negative critiques, with Mandy Moobs being safe. Brenda Bressed and Max Drag Queen lip-sync to "Like A Girl Does" by Peach PRC. Max Drag Queen wins the lip-sync and Brenda Bressed sashays away.: Guest Judge: Peach PRC; Alternating Coach: Spankie Jackzon; Mini-Challenge: Reading is Fundamental; Mini-Challenge Winner: Vybe; Mini-Challenge Prize: A Singer C430 sewing machine; Main Challenge: Makeover librarians; Runway Theme: Drag Family Storytime; Challenge Winners: Nikita Iman and Vybe; Challenge Prize: A $2,500 cash tip from Anastasia Beverly Hills; Bottom Two: Brenda Bressed and Max Drag Queen; Lip-Sync Song: "Like A Girl Does" by Peach PRC; Eliminated: Brenda Bressed; Farewell Message:
30	6	"Platy-Pussies On Fire"	6 December 2024
For this week's mini-challenge, the queens attempt to make Michelle Visage slap them. Freya Armani wins the mini-challenge. For the main challenge, the queens audition for the role of "Tutu Much" on the soap "Platy-Pussies On Fire". On the runway, category is Liquid Dreams. Freya Armani and Lazy Susan receive positive critiques, with Lazy Susan winning the challenge. Max Drag Queen, Nikita Iman and Vybe receive negative critiques, with Vybe being safe. Max Drag Queen and Nikita Iman lip-sync to "Talking Body" by Tove Lo. Nikita Iman wins the lip-sync and Max Drag Queen sashays away.: Guest Judge: Matt Okine; Alternating Coach: Isis Avis Loren; Mini-Challenge: Attempt to make Michelle Visage slap them; Mini-Challenge Winner: Freya Armani; Mini-Challenge Prize: A two night stay and dinner experience from Hilton Auckland; Main Challenge: Audition for the role of "Tutu Much" on the soap "Platy-Pussies On Fire"; Runway Theme: Liquid Dreams; Challenge Winner: Lazy Susan; Challenge Prize: A $2,500 gift card courtesy of Glitter au Gogo; Bottom Two: Max Drag Queen and Nikita Iman; Lip-Sync Song: "Talking Body" by Tove Lo; Eliminated: Max Drag Queen; Farewell Message:
31	7	"The Rhys Roast"	13 December 2024
For this week's main challenge, the queens perform a roast of Rhys Nicholson. On the runway, category is Cape Fierce. Freya Armani, Lazy Susan and Vybe receive positive critiques, with Vybe winning the challenge. Mandy Moobs and Nikita Iman receive negative critiques, and are announced as the bottom two. They lip-sync to "Searchin'" by Young Divas. Mandy Moobs wins the lip-sync and Nikita Iman sashays away.: Guest Judge: Anita Wigl'it; Alternating Coach: Kita Mean; Main Challenge: Perform a roast of Rhys Nicholson; Runway Theme: Cape Fierce; Challenge Winner: Vybe; Challenge Prize: $3,500 worth of custom prosthetics courtesy of Body FX; Bottom Two: Mandy Moobs and Nikita Iman; Lip-Sync Song: "Searchin'" by Young Divas; Eliminated: Nikita Iman; Farewell Message:
32	8	"Grand Finale"	20 December 2024
For the final challenge of the season, the queens write, record and perform their own verses to the original song "The Biggest". On the runway, category is Crowning Glory. Freya Armani is eliminated, leaving Lazy Susan, Mandy Moobs and Vybe as the top three queens of the season. They lip-sync to "Came Here for Love" by Sigala and Ella Eyre. It is announced that Lazy Susan is the winner, leaving Mandy Moobs and Vybe as the runners-up.: Guest Judge: Sophie Monk; Alternating Coach: Isis Avis Loren; Main Challenge: Write, record and perform their own verses to the original song "The Biggest"; Runway Theme: Crowning Glory; Eliminated: Freya Armani; Lip-Sync Song: "Came Here for Love" by Sigala and Ella Eyre; Runners-up: Mandy Moobs and Vybe; Winner of Drag Race Down Under Season Four: Lazy Susan
