= Lizzie Welborn =

Australian ironwoman and surf lifesaver (born 1998)

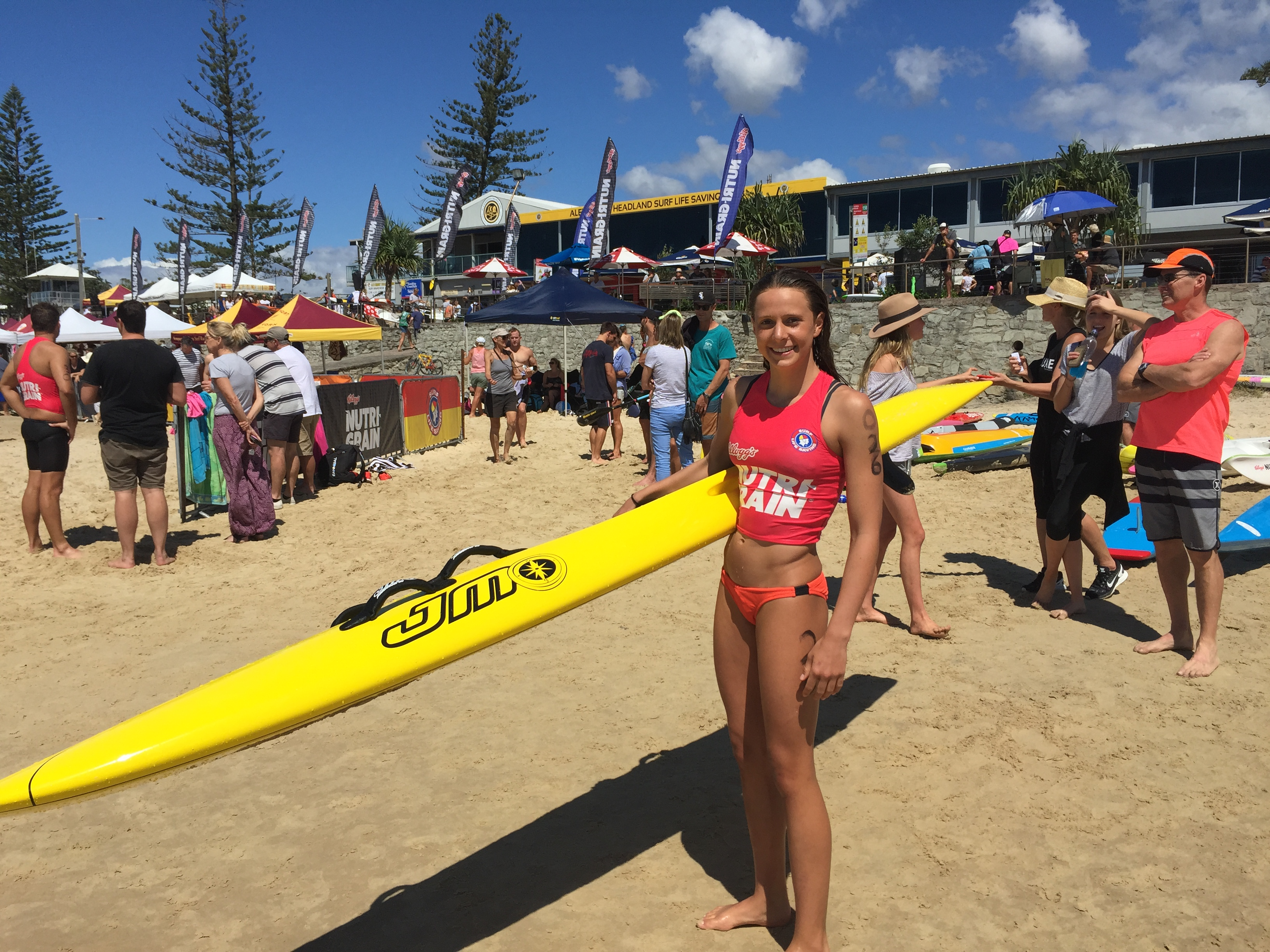

Elizabeth Welborn (born 1 November 1998) is an Australian ironwoman and surf lifesaver.
