= RuPaul's Drag Race Down Under season 1 =

2021 season of RuPaul's Drag Race Down Under

RuPaul's Drag Race Down Under
- Season 1
- Promotional poster for season one
- Hosted by: RuPaul
- Judges: RuPaul; Michelle Visage; Rhys Nicholson
- No. of contestants: 10
- Winner: Kita Mean
- Runners-up: Art Simone; Karen from Finance; Scarlet Adams
- No. of episodes: 8

Release
- Original network: Stan (AU); TVNZ 2 & TVNZ OnDemand (NZ); WOW Presents Plus (International)
- Original release: 1 May – 19 June 2021

Season chronology
- Next → Season 2

The first season of RuPaul's Drag Race Down Under began airing on 1 May and concluded on 19 June 2021.

Ten Australian and New Zealand-based drag queens competed for the title of the "Down Under's first Drag Superstar", a one-year supply of Revolution Beauty Cosmetics, and a cash prize of $30,000. The winner of the first season of RuPaul's Drag Race Down Under was Kita Mean, with Art Simone, Karen from Finance and Scarlet Adams as runners-up.

== Production ==
Initially announced as a solely Australian version in 2019, production was moved to New Zealand due to the COVID-19 pandemic in Australia. Filmed in Auckland, the series features drag queens from both Australia and New Zealand competing to be "Down Under's first Drag Superstar".

Australian comedian Rhys Nicholson was confirmed to join RuPaul and Michelle Visage as a judge. They officially announced the ten contestants at the Sydney Gay and Lesbian Mardi Gras on 6 March 2021.

The three New Zealand-based queens were on House of Drag, with Anita Wigl'it and Kita Mean as judges and Elektra Shock as the runner-up on season 2.

== Contestants ==
Ages, names, and cities stated are at time of filming.

Contestants of RuPaul's Drag Race Down Under season 1 and their backgrounds
Contestant	Age	Hometown	Outcome
Kita Mean	34	Auckland, New Zealand	Winner
Art Simone	28	Melbourne, Australia	Runners-up (Note: Art Simone originally placed 9th before returning to the competition.)
Karen from Finance	32	Melbourne, Australia	Runners-up
Scarlet Adams	27	Perth, Australia	Runners-up
Elektra Shock	28	Auckland, New Zealand	5th place
Maxi Shield	46	Ballina, Australia	6th place
Etcetera Etcetera	22	Canberra, Australia	7th place
Anita Wigl'it	31	Auckland, New Zealand	8th place
Coco Jumbo	29	Coffs Harbour, Australia	9th place
Jojo Zaho	30	Newcastle, Australia	10th place

== Contestant progress ==
Legend:

Kita Mean won RuPaul's Drag Race Down Under season 1.
Art Simone, Karen from Finance and Scarlet Adams were the runners-up.
WIN indicates that the contestant won the challenge.
SAFE indicates that the contestant was declared safe by the judges.
BTM (Bottom) indicates that the contestant was up for elimination.
ELIM (Eliminated) indicates that the contestant was eliminated.

Contestants progress with placements in each episode
Contestant	Episode							
Contestant	1	2	3	4	5	6	7	8
Kita Mean	SAFE	SAFE	SAFE	SAFE	SAFE	WIN	BTM	Winner
Art Simone	SAFE	ELIM		SAFE	SAFE	SAFE	SAFE	Runner-up
Karen from Finance	WIN	SAFE	SAFE	BTM	SAFE	SAFE	SAFE	Runner-up
Scarlet Adams	SAFE	SAFE	WIN	WIN	SAFE	BTM	WIN	Runner-up
Elektra Shock	BTM	SAFE	BTM	SAFE	WIN	SAFE	ELIM	
Maxi Shield	SAFE	SAFE	SAFE	SAFE	BTM	ELIM		
Etcetera Etcetera	SAFE	SAFE	SAFE	SAFE	ELIM			
Anita Wigl'it	SAFE	WIN	SAFE	ELIM				
Coco Jumbo	SAFE	BTM	ELIM					
Jojo Zaho	ELIM							

== Lip syncs ==
Legend:

The contestant won the Lip Sync for the Crown and was declared the winner of the season.
The contestant was eliminated after their first time in the bottom.
The contestant was eliminated after their second time in the bottom.
The contestant was eliminated after their third time in the bottom.

Episode	Contestants			Song	Eliminated
1	Elektra Shock	vs.	Jojo Zaho	"Tragedy" (Bee Gees)	Jojo Zaho
2	Art Simone	vs.	Coco Jumbo	"I'm That Bitch" (RuPaul)	Art Simone
3	Coco Jumbo	vs.	Elektra Shock	"Shake Your Groove Thing" (Peaches & Herb)	Coco Jumbo
4	Anita Wigl'it	vs.	Karen from Finance	"I Begin to Wonder" (Dannii Minogue)	Anita Wigl'it
5	Etcetera Etcetera	vs.	Maxi Shield	"Absolutely Everybody" (Vanessa Amorosi)	Etcetera Etcetera
6	Maxi Shield	vs.	Scarlet Adams	"Better the Devil You Know" (Kylie Minogue)	Maxi Shield
7	Elektra Shock	vs.	Kita Mean	"Untouched" (The Veronicas)	Elektra Shock
Episode	Contestants			Song	Winner
8	Art Simone vs. Karen from Finance vs. Kita Mean vs. Scarlet Adams			"Physical" (Olivia Newton-John)	Kita Mean

== Guest judges ==
Listed in chronological order:

- Elz Carrad, New Zealand actor
- Rena Owen, New Zealand actress in theatre, television and film

=== Special guests ===
Guests who appeared in episodes, but did not judge on the main stage.

Episode 1

- Taika Waititi, New Zealand film and television director

Episode 2

- Kylie Minogue, Australian singer and actress
- Dannii Minogue, Australian singer and actress

Episode 3

- Troye Sivan, Australian singer-songwriter
- Leland, American singer

Episode 5

- Suzanne Paul, infomercial hostess and television presenter

Episode 6

- Aunty Donna, Australian absurdist comedy group from Melbourne

Episode 7

- Raven, American drag queen and runner-up on both the second season of RuPaul's Drag Race and the first season of All Stars
- The Veronicas, Australian pop duo from Brisbane

Episode 8

- Dame Olivia Newton-John, British-Australian singer, songwriter, actress, entrepreneur and activist
- Chloe Lattanzi, American singer and actress, daughter to Dame Olivia Newton-John
- Lance Savali, New Zealand dancer/choreographer from Wellington

== Episodes ==
No. overall	No. in season	Title	Original release date
1	1	"G'day, G'day, G'day"	1 May 2021
Ten queens enter the workroom. For the first mini-challenge, the queens audition for the Intergalactic Superhero movie "Thar". Elektra Shock wins the mini-challenge. For the main challenge, the queens present two looks for the Get to Know You Ball: Born Naked and No Place Like Home. On the runway, Art Simone, Karen from Finance and Scarlet Adams receive positive critiques, with Karen from Finance winning the challenge. Coco Jumbo, Elektra Shock and Jojo Zaho receive negative critiques, with Coco Jumbo being safe. Elektra Shock and Jojo Zaho lip-sync to "Tragedy" by Bee Gees. Elektra Shock wins the lip-sync and Jojo Zaho is the first queen to sashay away.: Mini-Challenge: Audition for the Intergalactic Superhero movie "Thar"; Mini-Challenge Winner: Elektra Shock; Main Challenge: Get to Know You Ball; Runway Themes: Born Naked and No Place Like Home; Challenge Winner: Karen from Finance; Challenge Prize: A $3,000 cash tip courtesy of Mary's Poppin' in Adelaide; Bottom Two: Elektra Shock and Jojo Zaho; Lip-Sync Song: "Tragedy" by Bee Gees; Eliminated: Jojo Zaho; Farewell Message: " I am so happy to call each & everyone of you mob(sisters). Bring that crown home. Aussie, Aussie, Aussie, Oi Oi Oi. Jojo Zaho x now clean this mirror bitch lol"
2	2	"Snatch Game"	8 May 2021
For this week's main challenge, the queens play the Snatch Game. Michelle Visage and Rhys Nicholson star as the celebrity contestants. The characters are as follows: Anita Wigl'it as Elizabeth II; Art Simone as Bindi Irwin; Coco Jumbo as Lizzo; Elektra Shock as Catherine O'Hara; Etcetera Etcetera as Lindy Chamberlain-Creighton; Karen from Finance as Dolly Parton; Kita Mean as Dr. Seuss; Maxi Shield as Magda Szubanski; Scarlet Adams as Jennifer Coolidge; On the runway, category is Sea-Sickening. Anita Wigl'it wins the challenge. Art Simone, Coco Jumbo, Elektra Shock, Karen from Finance, Maxi Shield and Scarlet Adams receive negative critiques, with Art Simone and Coco Jumbo being announced as the bottom two. They lip-sync to "I'm That Bitch" by RuPaul. Coco Jumbo wins the lip-sync and Art Simone sashays away.: Main Challenge: Snatch Game; Runway Theme: Sea-Sickening; Challenge Winner: Anita Wigl'it; Challenge Prize: A $5,000 cash tip courtesy of Barefoot Wine Australia; Bottom Two: Art Simone and Coco Jumbo; Lip-Sync Song: "I'm That Bitch" by RuPaul; Eliminated: Art Simone; Farewell Message: "REDЯUM ♡ Art. Karen bring home that crown!"
3	3	"Queens Down Under"	15 May 2021
For this week's mini-challenge, the queens create a slow-motion surf rescue for "Babewatch". For the main challenge, the queens write, record, and perform verses to "Queens Down Under".: Team Outback Fake-Hoes: Anita Wigl'it, Coco Jumbo, Etcetera Etcetera and Scarlet Adams; Team Three and a Half Men: Elektra Shock, Karen from Finance, Kita Mean and Maxi Shield; On the runway, category is Bogan Prom Realness. Anita Wigl'it, Kita Mean and Scarlet Adams receive positive critiques, with Scarlet Adams winning the challenge. Coco Jumbo, Elektra Shock and Maxi Shield receive negative critiques, with Maxi Shield being safe. Coco Jumbo and Elektra Shock lip-sync to "Shake Your Groove Thing" by Peaches & Herb. Elektra Shock wins the lip-sync and Coco Jumbo sashays away.: Mini-Challenge: Slow-motion surf rescue for "Babewatch"; Mini-Challenge Winners: Elektra Shock and Scarlet Adams; Mini-Challenge Prizes: A $2,500 gift card courtesy of Philmah's Werqshop for Elektra Shock and a $2,500 gift card courtesy of Glitter au Gogo for Scarlet Adams; Main Challenge: Write, record, and perform verses to "Queens Down Under"; Runway Theme: Bogan Prom Realness; Challenge Winner: Scarlet Adams; Challenge Prize: A $4,500 custom prosthetic piece from BodyFX; Bottom Two: Coco Jumbo and Elektra Shock; Lip-Sync Song: "Shake Your Groove Thing" by Peaches & Herb; Eliminated: Coco Jumbo; Farewell Message: "I ♡ you my sisters. THE PARTY STARTS NOW!! ♡ COCO JUMBO. PS: WATCH OUT BITCH."
4	4	"Rucycled"	22 May 2021
At the beginning of the episode, it is revealed that Art Simone will be returning to the competition. For this week's main challenge, the queens create an outfit made from items found in the local op shop. On the runway, Art Simone, Maxi Shield and Scarlet Adams receive positive critiques, with Scarlet Adams winning the challenge. Anita Wigl'it, Etcetera Etcetera and Karen from Finance receive negative critiques, with Etcetera Etcetera being safe. Anita Wigl'it and Karen from Finance lip-sync to "I Begin to Wonder" by Dannii Minogue. Karen from Finance wins the lip-sync and Anita Wigl'it sashays away.: Guest Judge: Elz Carrad; Returned: Art Simone; Main Challenge: Create an outfit made from items found in the local op shop; Challenge Winner: Scarlet Adams; Challenge Prize: $2,500 gift card from Elea's Closet; Bottom Two: Anita Wigl'it and Karen from Finance; Lip-Sync Song: "I Begin to Wonder" by Dannii Minogue; Eliminated: Anita Wigl'it; Farewell Message: "To my beautiful queens, You are everything to me! I come in with 3 Kiwi sisters and leave with a whole Australian sisters hood. Never forget my Dry Arse Pussy. Anita P.S. see you in two in the trash."
5	5	"Marketing Hats"	29 May 2021
For this week's mini-challenge, the queens read each other to filth. Art Simone wins the mini-challenge. For the main challenge, the queens create an infomercial for their own Yeast Spread.: Art Simone - Yeasty Yank Extractor; Elektra Shock - Topped; Etcetera Etcetera - Pissed; Karen from Finance - Discharge; Kita Mean - Yeasty Nuts; Maxi Shield - Hornbag; Scarlet Adams - Snatch; On the runway, category is Finest Sheila in the Bush. Elektra Shock and Kita Mean receive positive critiques, with Elektra Shock winning the challenge. Etcetera Etcetera, Karen from Finance and Maxi Shield receive negative critiques, with Karen from Finance being safe. Etcetera Etcetera and Maxi Shield lip-sync to "Absolutely Everybody" by Vanessa Amorosi. Maxi Shield wins the lip-sync and Etcetera Etcetera sashays away.: Guest Judge: Rena Owen; Mini-Challenge: Reading is Fundamental; Mini-Challenge Winner: Art Simone; Mini-Challenge Prize: A Sewing machine courtesy of Singer; Main Challenge: Create an infomercial for your own Yeast Spread; Runway Theme: Finest Sheila in the Bush; Challenge Winner: Elektra Shock; Challenge Prize: A 4 night stay at a Sofitel property of choice in Australia or New Zealand courtesy of Sofitel Viaduct Auckland Harbour; Bottom Two: Etcetera Etcetera and Maxi Shield; Lip-Sync Song: "Absolutely Everybody" by Vanessa Amorosi; Eliminated: Etcetera Etcetera; Farewell Message: "YIPPEE YIPPEE! TRANS PEOPLE DESERVE MORE! I LOVE YOU BITCHES ♡ ETC THE GLAMOUR BUG XO"
6	6	"Family Resemblance"	5 June 2021
For this week's mini-challenge, the queens interact with local wildlife. Maxi Shield wins the mini-challenge. For the main challenge, the queens makeover rugby players. On the runway, category is Drag Family Resemblance. Karen from Finance and Kita Mean receive positive critiques, with Kita Mean winning the challenge. Elektra Shock, Maxi Shield and Scarlet Adams receive negative critiques, with Elektra Shock being safe. Maxi Shield and Scarlet Adams lip-sync to "Better the Devil You Know" by Kylie Minogue. Scarlet Adams wins the lip-sync and Maxi Shield sashays away.: Mini-Challenge: Interact with local wildlife; Mini-Challenge Winner: Maxi Shield; Mini-Challenge Prize: $2,000 gift card from Amped accessories; Main Challenge: Makeover rugby players; Runway Theme: Drag Family Resemblance; Challenge Winner: Kita Mean; Main Challenge Prize: A $2,500 prize package courtesy of House of Priscilla and a $1,500 gift card courtesy of DailyJocks for their partner; Bottom Two: Maxi Shield and Scarlet Adams; Lip Sync Song: "Better the Devil You Know" by Kylie Minogue; Eliminated: Maxi Shield; Farewell Message: "I HAD TO STAND ON A STOOL TO WRITE THIS! I ♡ YOU ALL SO MUCH MAXI XX"
7	7	"Talent Show Extravaganza"	12 June 2021
For this week's main challenge, the queens perform a talent show in front of the judges.: Art Simone - Eating; Elektra Shock - Modern Dance; Karen from Finance - Ballooning; Kita Mean - Quick Magic Change; Scarlet Adams - Pole Dancing; On the runway, category is How's Your Head Piece? Scarlet Adams wins the challenge. Elektra Shock and Kita Mean receive negative critiques, are announced as the bottom two. They lip-sync to Untouched" by The Veronicas. Kita Mean wins the lip-sync and Elektra Shock sashays away.: Main Challenge: Perform a talent show in front of the judges; Runway Theme: How's Your Head Piece?; Challenge Winner: Scarlet Adams; Challenge Prize: A range of individualized merch and a $5,000 cash tip courtesy of Merch Mother; Bottom Two: Elektra Shock & Kita Mean; Lip-Sync Song: "Untouched" by The Veronicas; Eliminated: Elektra Shock; Farewell Message: "Only 1 queen could beat me, and that's the winner of Rupaul's Drag Race Down Under. Kia Kaha x THANK YOU. Elektra SHOCK"
8	8	"Down Under Grand Finale"	19 June 2021
For the final challenge of the season, the queens write, record and perform verses to RuPaul's song "I'm A Winner, Baby" On the runway, category is Best Drag. The four finalists are told that they will be lip-syncing to "Physical" by Olivia Newton-John. It is announced that Kita Mean is the winner, leaving Art Simone, Karen from Finance and Scarlet Adams as the runners-up.: Main Challenge: Write, record and perform verses to RuPaul's song "I'm A Winner, Baby"; Runway Theme: Best Drag; Lip-Sync Song: "Physical" by Olivia Newton-John; Runners-up: Art Simone, Karen from Finance and Scarlet Adams; Winner of RuPaul's Drag Race Down Under Season One: Kita Mean

== Controversies ==
Following the cast reveal, video footage and images surfaced of Scarlet Adams "wearing a shirt with the Aboriginal flag, with dark tanned skin and two teeth blacked out". Guardian Australia reported that the image was taken in 2012 during Australia Day celebrations. Other images feature Adams in blackface as an African American woman and playing Asian stereotypes by wearing a sari as part of a Bollywood character. Adams apologised via social media in 2020 before being revealed as a cast member and later released a new apology in March 2021. In the series fifth episode, RuPaul addressed the controversy during the judges' critiques. Adams said, “I can’t deny that that happened. As a dumb, ignorant teenager, I made some mistakes that I’m really not proud of, and every day, I regret those decisions, I regret the fact that I used my platform as a performer to ridicule people who have faced systemic racism for hundreds of years and I’m so ashamed of the person I once was. I’m really sorry to you and to everyone that I have hurt.”

Another contestant, Karen from Finance, was also reported to be involved in racial insensitivity after photos emerged showing a tattoo of a golliwog. Karen from Finance addressed the controversy on their social media by saying "I made the uninformed, ignorant and regrettable decision to have one of these dolls tattooed. In the years that followed ... I realised how irresponsible and stupid I had been so I disposed of the dolls to landfill and had my tattoo covered."

Art Simone's return to the competition in Episode 4 also led to accusations of racism, with the show's lack of explanation for Simone's return leading to some viewers to question why a white contestant was allowed to return, but not the two recently eliminated contestants of colour.

Etcetera Etcetera's performance as Lindy Chamberlain-Creighton in the Snatch Game (episode 2) draw widespread condemnation, as her impersonation heavily mocked the death of Chamberlain's baby daughter, accompanied with a bloodstained dingo puppet, which was criticised as being cruel, offensive and insensitive considering how Chamberlain-Creighton was wrongfully convicted for her daughter's death.

Certain jokes made by Anita Wigl'it about Prince Andrew during her Snatch Game appearance as Elizabeth II in Episode Two were censored by the BBC for the UK screenings of the episode. Wigl'it was later accused of plagiarism by Australian comedian Anthony Lehmann, who claimed that Wigl'it stole a joke that he had originally cracked in August 2020. Wigl'it later issued an apology on her Instagram, saying “Oh no! I do apologise!! When I was doing research for the Queen character I knew that there was something funny about the letter writing[...]Friends suggested the text. Turns out they had heard it somewhere before!”

== Awards and nominations ==
Year	Award ceremony	Category	Nominee	Results	Ref.
2022	New Zealand Television Awards	Television Personality of the Year	Anita Wigl'it	Nominated	
