= Nicole Rogerson =

- Born: 1974 (age 51–52); Sydney, Australia
- Spouse: Ian Rogerson

Nicole Rogerson (born 1974 in Sydney) is the founding Director and CEO of Autism Awareness Australia.

== Career ==
Rogerson began her career in marketing and public relations.

In 2003 Rogerson became the co-founder and Director of the Lizard Children's Centre, an early intervention centre for children with autism and developmental delays that uses the controversial Applied behavior analysis (ABA) technique.

In 2007 Rogerson established Autism Awareness Australia.

In 2011 Rogerson hosted the National Autism Summit.

In 2011 and 2013 Rogerson was invited to present at the United Nations, where Autism Awareness Australia has been inducted as a member organisation.

Rogerson has appeared on 60 Minutes, The 7.30 Report, Today, A Current Affair and Australian Story and in the Australian Women's Weekly.

== Personal life ==
Rogerson is married to broadcaster Ian Rogerson and has two sons.
