= Jarrod Castaing =

Australian landscape photographer

- Born: 1983 (age 42–43); Sydney
- Known for: Landscape photography
- Notable work: Metlako Falls, Mount Hood Meadow, Lavender Fields
- Website: www.jarrodcastaing.com

Jarrod Castaing (born 1983) is a photographer from Sydney, Australia. Castaing is known for his landscape photographs and limited edition photographic prints from over 50 countries. Castaing was named USA Landscape Photographer of the Year Runner-up in 2014 and exhibited at the Smithsonian Museum of Natural History in Washington, D.C.

He was considered one of the most celebrated landscape photographers in Australia, due to his use of vibrant colors in his photographs.

== Early life ==
Castaing was born in Sydney, Australia to parents of British and New Zealand heritage. Before discovering photography, he studied fine art establishing for himself a foundation in light and composition, while being inspired to travel from books on exotic locations and foreign countries.

Castaing moved to London and travelled for several years before returning to Sydney in 2012.

== Career ==
On 23 June 2015, Castaing photographed the Aurora Australis, which was visible Sydney's Northern Beaches in Australia, a rare event, and was featured on Nine News and Seven Sunrise broadcast programs.

Castaing's photographs have been featured in National Geographic publications, and gallery exhibitions worldwide including the South Australian Museum The Rocks in Sydney, and the Smithsonian Museum of Natural History in Washington, D.C.

Castaing guides workshops around the world sharing his photographic techniques.

== Recognition ==
In 2012, Castaing was awarded Better Photography Photograph of the Year. During 2013, he was a finalist in the Australian Nature Photographer of the Year (ANZANG), Wildlife Photographer of the Year (NHM), Windland Smith Rice International Awards (semi-finalist), Sony World Photography Awards (WPO commended) and the Epson International Pano Awards (5 Silver).

Castaing was named both USA Landscape Photographer of the Year Runner-up and Classic View Winner in 2014.

In 2016, Castaing received the Ken Duncan Real Australia Landscape Photo Award.

Castaing was awarded as a runner up in the 2019 Australian Geographic Nature Photographer of the year and exhibited at both the South Australian Museum in Adelaide and the Powerhouse Museum in Sydney.
