= Costa Andricopoulos =

Australian footballer

Personal information
- Full name: Costa Andricopoulos
- Date of birth: 30 March 1991 (age 35)
- Place of birth: Sydney
- Height: 1.76 m (5 ft 9 in)
- Position: Defender

Team information
- Current team: Canterbury Bankstown

Youth career
- 2007–2008: Bankstown Berries
- 2009–2010: APOEL

Senior career*
Years	Team	Apps	(Gls)
2010–2011	APOEL	0	(0)
2010–2011	→ Ethnikos Latsion (loan)	11	(1)
2011–2012	Anorthosis Famagusta	3	(0)
2013–2015	St George	22	(0)
2015	Blacktown Spartans	1	(0)
2016	Hakoah Sydney City East	13	(0)
2018–2019	Canterbury Bankstown	36	(1)
- * Club domestic league appearances and goals as of 26 September 2019

Costa Andricopoulos (born 30 March 1991) is an Australian-born footballer who currently plays for Hakoah Sydney City East FC.
