= Karen from Finance =

Australian drag performer

- Born: Richard Chadwick
- Occupation: Drag queen
- Known for: RuPaul's Drag Race Down Under
- Website: karenfromfinance.com

Richard Chadwick, better known by the stage name Karen from Finance, is an Australian drag performer and a runner-up on the first season of RuPaul's Drag Race Down Under.

== Career ==
Karen from Finance attended RuPaul's DragCon LA in 2017, 2018 and 2019. She also performed at the Austin International Drag Festival in 2017. She is an original member of the "Melbourne based cult queer cabaret 'YUMMY', a show which has garnered international acclaim for its subversive glamour and gone on to tour across Australia and the world", according to Jessi Lewis of the Star Observer.

Karen from Finance has debuted a stand-up show.

In October 2022, Karen from Finance announced the forthcoming release of debut studio album, Doing Time, scheduled for release on 2 December 2022. The album features the singles, "Out of Office", "Doing Time" and "It Should Have Been an Email".

== Personal life ==
Chadwick lives in Melbourne. In June 2026, The Guardian reported that Chadwick is in a relationship with Brendan Maclean.

== Filmography ==
=== Music videos ===
| Year | Title | Artist |
|---|---|---|
| 2020 | In My Blood | Tammie Brown ft. The Huxleys |
| 2021 | Karen from Finance: Out of Office | Karen from Finance |

=== Television ===
| Year | Title | Role | Notes |
|---|---|---|---|
| 2014 | Offspring | Pashing Couple 2 | Episode: "Moving On" |
| 2017 | Hey Qween! | Herself | Episode: "Karen from Finance" |
| 2021 | RuPaul's Drag Race Down Under | Contestant | Runner-up (8 episodes) |

== Discography ==
=== Albums ===
List of albums, with selected details
| Title | Details |
|---|---|
| Doing Time | Scheduled: 2 December 2022; Format: digital; Label: Karen from Finance |
