= Lazy Susan (drag queen) =

Australian drag performer

- Born: Robert Sinclair Ten Eyck
- Citizenship: Australia; United States
- Occupation: Drag queen
- Television: Drag Race Down Under (season 4)

Lazy Susan is the stage name of Robert "Robbie" Sinclair Ten Eyck, an Australian filmmaker and drag queen, most notable for winning the fourth season of Drag Race Down Under.

== Career ==
Drag performer Lazy Susan competed on the fourth season of Drag Race Down Under. She won the Maxi Challenge in episodes 1, 2 and 6, and eventually won the season. She has performed with Charli XCX and appeared in a music video by Troye Sivan.

Skin Side Up, Ten Eyck's debut as a film director, is slated to premiere in the Frontières program at the 2025 Cannes Film Festival.

== Personal life ==
Lazy Susan is based in Melbourne and was brought up in the Dandenong Ranges.

== Filmography ==
- Drag Race Down Under (season 4; 2024)
- Drag Race Down Under vs. the World (2026)

== See also ==
- List of drag queens
- List of people from Melbourne
