= Terry Kennedy (speaker) =

Australian motivational speaker

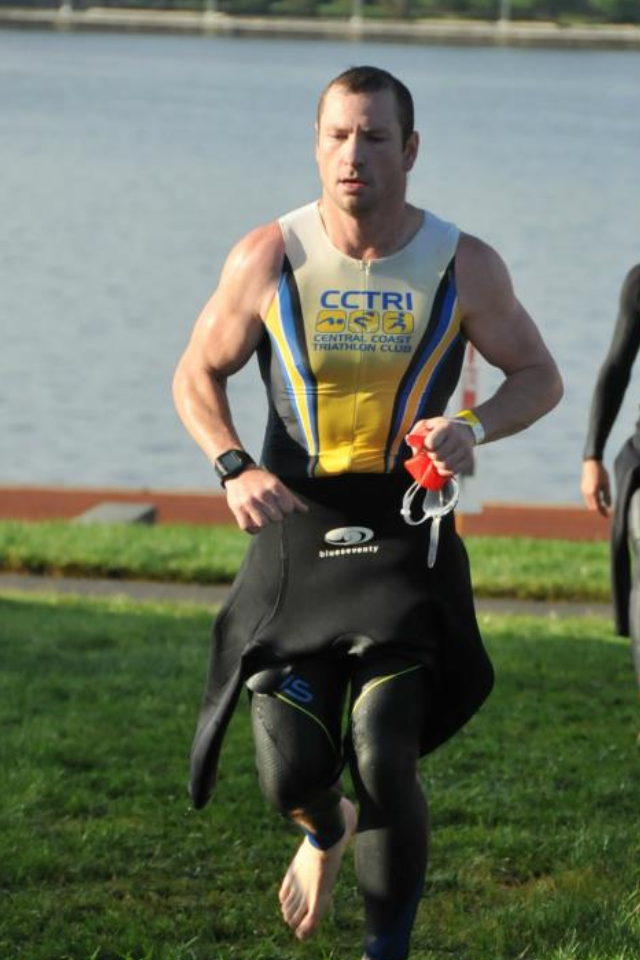
- Born: Sydney, Australia
- Occupations: Speaker & Amateur Athlete
- Known for: Motivational Speaking

Terry Kennedy (born 13 June 1978) is an Australian motivational speaker and amateur endurance triathlete. Kennedy is best known for completing the Melbourne marathon and Melbourne Ironman less than 9 months after a near fatal stroke and heart attack.

== Personal life ==
Kennedy was born in Sydney, Australia to Annette and Edmond in a family of 3 children. At the age of 16 Terry joined the Royal Australian Navy and went on to earn the Australian Service Medal at the age of 20. He now resides on the New South Wales Central Coast with his wife Briohny Kennedy and has two children and regularly competes in endurance triathlons.

== Career ==
=== Early career ===
After leaving Castlemaine secondary, he joined the Royal Australian Navy. Kennedy left the Royal Australian Navy and went to work in sales for various Telecommunications companies and then in advertising.

=== Family and Motivation ===
Kennedy's normal life changed forever. He was 35 kg overweight, unfit, unmotivated and unhappy. When his son Archie was born with a rare brain condition Septo-optic dysplasia, he underwent several operations and spent many months in hospital, Kennedy then decided a change was needed and lost 35 kg to better himself for his family.

His father was then diagnosed with an aggressive form of prostate cancer. His father had run marathons so he decided to use this newfound fitness to train for and run a marathon in his honour whilst he underwent treatment.

=== Stroke and Heart Attack ===
5 days before what would be his first marathon Terry suffered a brain stem stroke and heart attack at the age of 33. The stroke left him without the ability to see, walk or talk.

Drawing from the inspiration of those around him, Kennedy dedicated himself to talk, see and eventually walk again undergoing a vigorous rehabilitation program. As soon as Terry could walk again he set out to finish the goal he had originally set himself and entered the Melbourne marathon. He completed the Melbourne marathon 8 weeks out of hospital and 4 weeks after learning to walk again.

Kennedy had run 44 km, when the distance for the race was 42.2 km, this was due to zigzagging which was put down to balance issues. A neurologist advised him to cycle and swim to assist in the balance issues he was having. After beginning work in cycling and swimming, he signed up as a late entrant to The Melbourne Ironman. Terry hadn't swam 50m or cycled a kilometre in 15 years so he underwent an arduous training program and completed the Melbourne Ironman in March 2013 some 8 months after being discharged from hospital.

=== Hawaii Ironman ===
In July 2013 Kennedy won a place into the Hawaii Ironman World Championships. Kennedy was awarded his place in the October 2013 event by public vote under the Kona Inspired completion as one of the 6 most inspirational athletes around the world.

Kennedy was followed by The Project (Australian TV program) during the event. Kennedy went on to complete the grueling event overcoming severe sunburn and dehydration during the race to become a Hawaii Ironman World Championship finisher a little over a year after losing and then regaining the ability to see, talk and walk.

=== Motivational Speaking ===
In 2013 Kennedy established himself as a public speaker. He delivers a motivational and inspirational presentation detailing his story of overcoming tremendous adversities one after the other and coming out on top. Terry captured headlines across Australia with his story of dealing with near death experiences far beyond his control and then controlling what he could in regaining his health to complete an Ironman event.

==== Teachings ====
A big part of Kennedy's speaking focuses on challenging people to discover a purpose and develop and set big goals. He strongly emphasises the importance of accountability not allowing circumstances outside of your control to hinder your goals. Kennedy advocates looking forward after a crisis and not be discouraged by challenges and setbacks, which may arise. He inspires audiences to create big goals and announce them publicly and in turn creating personal accountability.
