= John Yeomans (writer) =

Australian journalist and writer

John Storie Yeomans
- Born: 15 May 1916; Sydney, New South Wales, Australia
- Died: 9 June 1995 (aged 79); Balgowlah Heights, New South Wales, Australia
- Occupations: writer and journalist
- Writing career
- Language: English
- Years active: 1969–1984

John Storie Yeomans (15 May 1916 – 9 June 1995) was an Australian journalist and writer.

== Career ==
During the 1960s and later, he wrote a range of books about Australia, Sydney and Sydney Opera House.

His most well-known book was written about his trip around Australia, The Scarce Australians, published by Penguin in 1969. The book was based on a journey undertaken between May and September 1965. The dust-jacket of the Penguin edition of The Scarce Australians summarizes the authors life and journalistic career thus:

Born and educated in Sydney...AIF field artillery subaltern in WWII... sub-editor in Fleet Street ...copy-editor in Canada ...staff correspondent for Australian papers in New York and London... sometime resident in Middle East and Papua

In 1978 he was in an accident where he almost lost an arm.

== Works ==
- Yeomans, John (1967), The scarce Australians, Longmans
- Yeomans, John (1973), The other Taj Mahal : what happened to the Sydney Opera House ([New ed.), Longman Australia, ISBN 978-0-582-71209-6
- Hornibrook Group; Yeomans, John (1973), Building the Sydney Opera House, [Hornibrook Group], ISBN 978-0-9598748-0-8
- Yeomans, John (1973), A guide to the Sydney Opera House, Sydney Opera House Trust, ISBN 9780909654016
- Yeomans, John (1978), The 20 best sights of Sydney, Collins, ISBN 978-0-00-216414-6
- Yeomans, John (1984), Harry, Angus & Robertson Publishers, ISBN 978-0-207-14886-6
- Yeomans, John (1987), Much curious pleasure : a novel, Angus & Robertson, ISBN 978-0-207-15470-6
