= Isis Avis Loren =

Australian drag performer

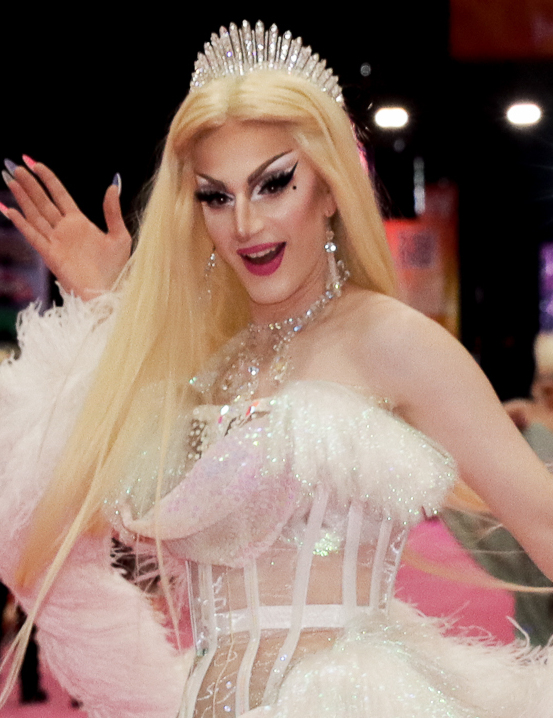
- Loren at RuPaul's DragCon LA, 2024
- Born: Michael
- Occupation: Drag queen
- Television: RuPaul's Drag Race Down Under (season 3)
- Website: isisavisloren.com

Isis Avis Loren (real first name Michael) is an Australian drag performer who is known for winning season 3 of RuPaul's Drag Race Down Under. The following year, she was introduced as judge on the show.

== Career ==
Isis Avis Loren is a drag performer. She won Best Costumier and Miss Congeniality at the Melbourne Drag Awards in 2019. She performs at Vau d'vile as part of the Vau d'vile Vixens.

In 2023, she competed in and won season 3 of RuPaul's Drag Race Down Under.

== Personal life ==
Based in Melbourne, Isis Avis Loren uses the pronouns she/they in drag and they/him/she out of drag.

== Filmography ==
=== Television ===
- 2021: Rediscover Victoria
- 2023: RuPaul's Drag Race Down Under (season 3)

== See also ==
- List of people from Melbourne
