= Scarlet Adams =

Australian drag performer

- Born: Anthony Price
- Television: RuPaul's Drag Race Down Under (season 1)

Scarlet Adams is the stage name of Anthony Price, an Australian drag performer who competed on the first season of RuPaul's Drag Race Down Under. She has been described as a burlesque performer, costume designer, and pole dancer. She was named Queen of the Court, Entertainer of the Year 2016 at the annual PROUD Awards, as well as Miss Burlesque Western Australia 2018. She is based in Perth, as of 2021. During her time on Drag Race, she was criticized for past use of blackface, for which she issued an apology.
