= Art Simone =

Australian drag performer

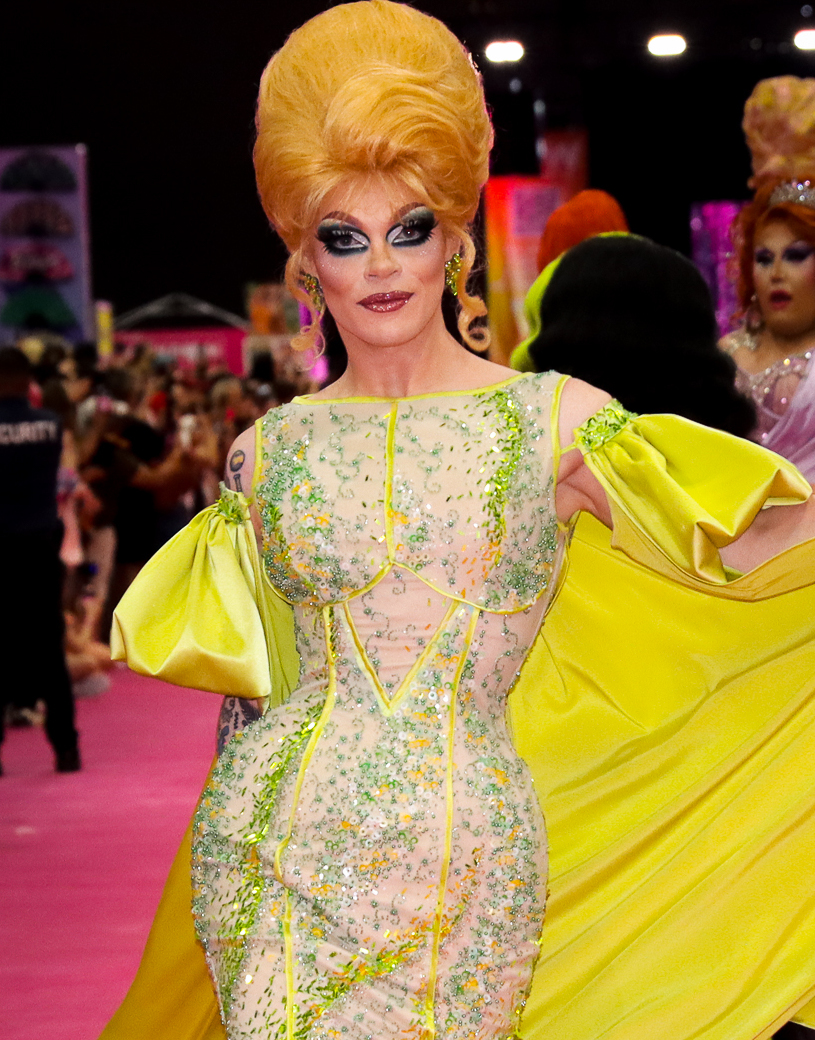
- Art Simone at RuPaul's DragCon LA, 2024
- Born: Jack Daye; 9 September 1992 (age 34); Melbourne, Victoria, Australia
- Television: RuPaul's Drag Race Down Under
- Website: artsimone.com

Jack Daye (born 9 September 1992), better known by the stage name Art Simone, is an Australian drag performer best known for finishing as a top four finalist on the first season of RuPaul's Drag Race Down Under in 2021, and as first runner-up in Drag Race Down Under vs. the World in 2026.

== Career ==
Art Simone competed on the first season of RuPaul's Drag Race Down Under. During Snatch Game, she impersonated Bindi Irwin, an impersonation for which she was eliminated second in 9th place in a shock elimination. However, she returned to the competition two episodes later and ultimately placed as a runner-up.

Previously, she starred in the WOW Presents Plus series Highway to Heel. She has also been named Drag Performer of the Year and earned the title Queen of Australia. Art Simone has also appeared on The Bachelor Australia and in multiple commercials.

== Personal life ==
Daye is from Melbourne and lives in Geelong, as of 2021.

== Filmography ==
=== Film ===
Year	Title	Role
2014	Cut Snake	Nightclub Drag Artist
2017	What If It Works?	Venus

=== Television ===
Year	Title	Role	Notes
2019	The Bachelor Australia	Herself	Guest (1 episode)
2020	Highway to Heel	Herself	1 season (6 episodes)
2021	RuPaul's Drag Race Down Under	Contestant	Runner-up (7 episodes)
2021	Have You Been Paying Attention?	Herself	Guest
2022	Bring Back My Girls	Herself	Guest (1 episode)
2022	Would I Lie to You?	Herself	Guest
2023	In Our Blood	Patty	1 season (4 episodes)
2024	The Cook Up with Adam Liaw	Herself	Guest
2024	Spicks and Specks	Herself	Guest
2026	Drag Race Down Under vs. the World	Herself	Contestant

== Bibliography ==
- Life is Art (2024)
- Drag Queens Down Under (2024)
