= Rhys Nicholson =

Australian comedian (born 1990)

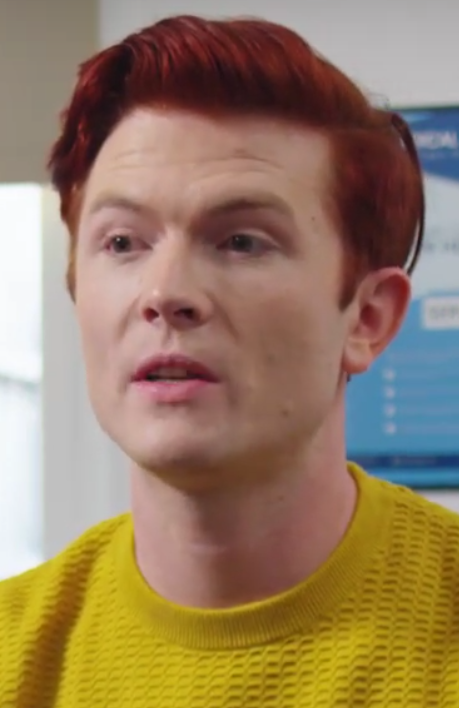
- Nicholson in 2019
- Born: 22 April 1990 (age 36); Newcastle, New South Wales, Australia
- Spouse: Kyran Wheatley

Comedy career
- Medium: Stand-up comedy, theatre, television, film
- Genre: Comedy
- Website: www.rhysnicholson.com

Rhys Nicholson (born 22 April 1990) is an Australian comedian and actor known for being a judge on Drag Race Down Under from 2021 onwards, as well as the spin-off Drag Race Down Under vs. the World.

== Career ==
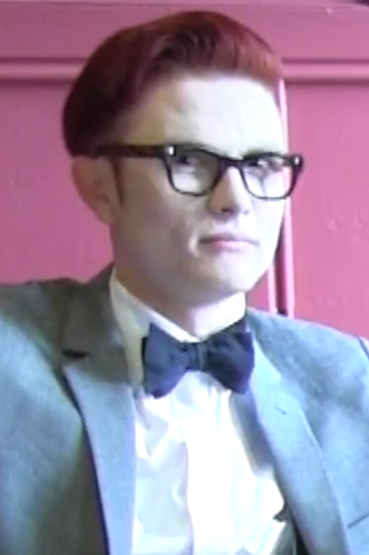
Nicholson in 2013

In 2014, Nicholson featured in the ABC documentary GayCrashers, alongside Joel Creasey, in which the duo travel to the small town of Colac and perform a stand-up show. Creasey had been the subject of a homophobic attack on an earlier visit to the town.

Nicholson stars on the ABC show The Weekly with Charlie Pickering.

In 2016, to highlight their view of the importance of same-sex marriage in Australia, Nicholson publicly married lesbian and fellow comedian Zoë Coombs Marr at the Melbourne International Comedy Festival. That year Nicholson and Coombs Marr were also both nominated for the Barry Award for Best Show, which Coombs Marr won.

In 2021, Nicholson served as a judge on RuPaul's Drag Race Down Under, alongside RuPaul and Michelle Visage. The same year they appeared on the panel show Patriot Brains. In 2022, they played Doctor Sarkov in Netflix's science-fiction series The Imperfects.

On 31 October 2023, Nicholson released a book Dish: Spiels, Scoops, Emotional Outbursts and the Occasional Recipe.

Nicholson competed in the third season of Taskmaster Australia, which began airing in September 2024. In 2025 they appeared as a contestant on Claire Hooper's House Of Games.

In October 2025, Nicholson was announced as a contestant on the third season of The Traitors Australia, which began airing in August 2026.

== Live solo shows ==
- Social Liability (2011)
- Almost a Person (2012)
- Dawn of a New Error (2013)
- Eurgh (2014)
- Forward (2015)
- Bona Fide (2016)
- I'm Fine (2017)
- Seminal (2018)
- Nice People, Nice Things, Nice Situations (2019)
- Live at The Athenaeum (2020)
- Rhys, Rhys, Rhys (2020, 2021, 2022)
- Huge Big Party Congratulations (2024)

== Personal life ==
Nicholson grew up in Newcastle to parents who were both artists. Nicholson is the nibling of Machine Gun Fellatio member Glenn Dormand and grew up around the band. (Note: Nibling being a gender-neutral term used in place of niece or nephew.)

Nicholson is gay and came out as non-binary in 2022, choosing to use they/them pronouns. They have also spoken openly about their struggle with bulimia.

In September 2023, Nicholson married their partner, former Triple J radio presenter Kyran Wheatley, with whom they had established Comedy Republic, a comedy venue in Melbourne.

They are a dual citizen of Australia and the United States, which they revealed in a July 2024 Instagram post.

== Awards and nominations ==
=== ARIA Music Awards ===
Year	Nominee / work	Award	Result	Ref.
2017	Rhys Nicholson Live at The Eternity Playhouse	Best Comedy Release	Nominated	
