= Drag Race Down Under =

New Zealand-Australian reality competition television series

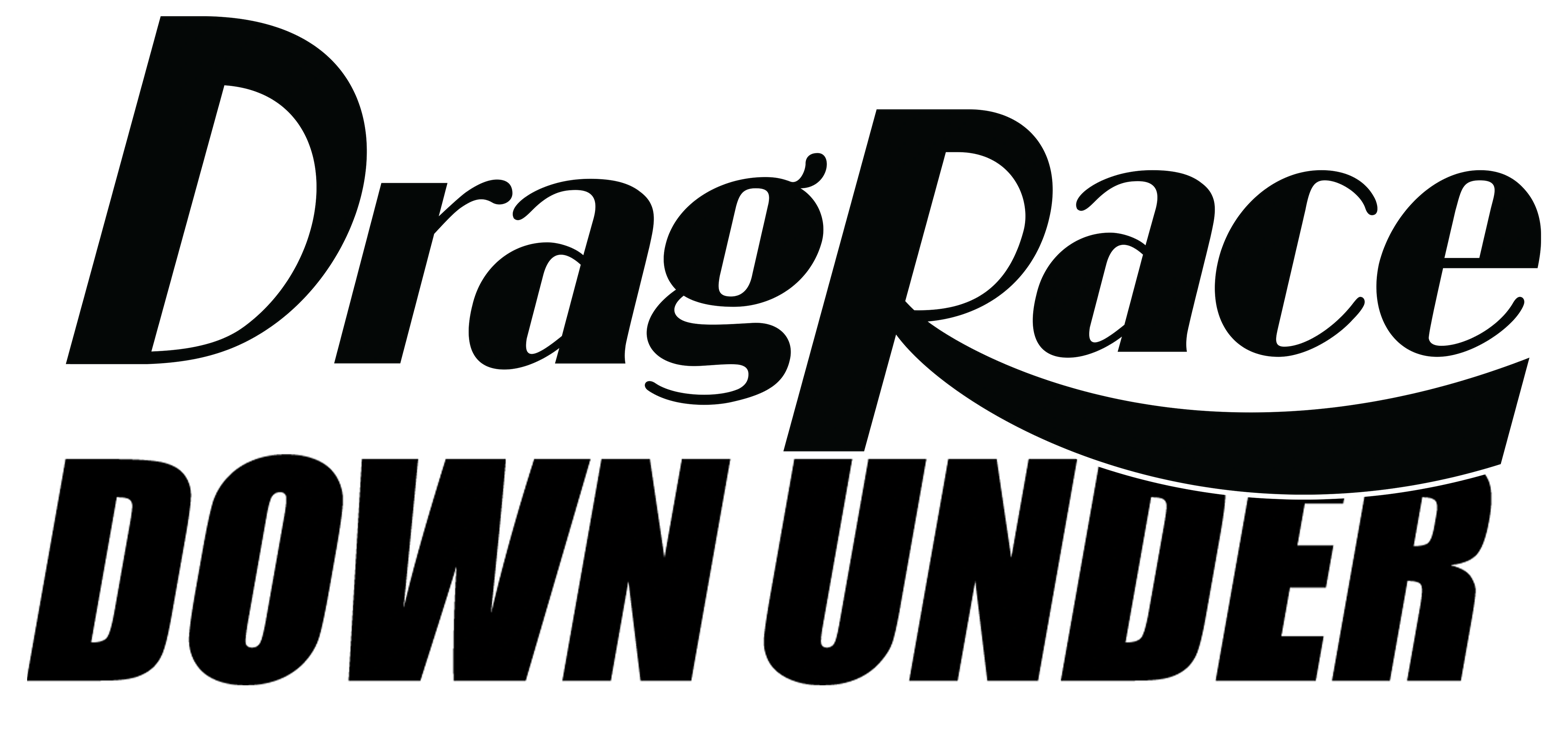
- Also known as: RuPaul's Drag Race Down Under
- Genre: Reality competition
- Based on: RuPaul's Drag Race
- Presented by: RuPaul; Michelle Visage
- Judges: Michelle Visage; Rhys Nicholson; Isis Avis Loren; Kita Mean; Spankie Jackzon
- Theme music composer: RuPaul
- Opening theme: RuPaul's Drag Race theme
- Ending theme: "I'm a Winner, Baby (Skeltal Ki Remix)" (seasons 1–3); "A Little Bit of Love" (season 4)
- Countries of origin: New Zealand; Australia
- Original language: English
- No. of seasons: 4
- No. of episodes: 32 (list of episodes)

Production
- Executive producers: RuPaul Charles; Fenton Bailey; Randy Barbato; Tom Campbell
- Producer: Amanda Pain
- Production locations: Grey Lynn, New Zealand
- Editors: Kermath; Cameron Pouesi; Lachlan Wilson; Jake Tattersall
- Camera setup: Multi-camera
- Running time: 60 minutes
- Production companies: World of Wonder; Warner Bros. International Television Production New Zealand

Original release
- Network: Stan (Australia); WOW Presents Plus (elsewhere)
- Release: 1 May 2021 – present
- Network: TVNZ 2 & TVNZ+ (New Zealand)
- Release: 1 May 2021 – 15 September 2023

Related
- Drag Race Down Under vs. the World

Drag Race Down Under is a New Zealand-Australian reality competition television series based on the American series RuPaul's Drag Race and part of the Drag Race franchise. Produced by World of Wonder and Warner Bros. International Television Production New Zealand, the series documents Michelle Visage and a panel of judges' search for "Down Under's next drag superstar" amongst each season's cast of Australian and New Zealand drag queens. The series airs on Stan in Australia and WOW Presents Plus in the rest of the world. It previously aired on TVNZ 2 and TVNZ+ in New Zealand, and also airs on BBC Three and BBC iPlayer in the United Kingdom and Crave in Canada

Premiering as RuPaul's Drag Race Down Under in 2021, it was the sixth international adaptation of RuPaul's Drag Race and its third English-language iteration following RuPaul's Drag Race UK and Canada's Drag Race. Originally featuring RuPaul as host, the series was renamed Drag Race Down Under from the fourth season to reflect his departure. A spin-off series, Drag Race Down Under vs. the World, premiered in 2026.

== History ==
Talks for an Australian version of Drag Race had been underway since at least August 2019 when local rights to the franchise were originally acquired by ITV Studios Australia. The series, dubbed "Drag Race Australia" in reporting, was planned to premiere in 2020, though at the time of the announcement no broadcast partners, judges or cast had been confirmed. A production by ITV Studios Australia never eventuated.

On 18 January 2021, RuPaul's Drag Race Down Under was formally announced as a World of Wonder production in collaboration with Warner Bros. International Television Production New Zealand, commissioned by Stan and TVNZ. RuPaul was confirmed to host, with Michelle Visage and Rhys Nicholson joining as regular judges. Production began in Auckland, New Zealand that week.

It was reported that production was originally slated to occur in Sydney, Australia, but moved due to Sydney's recent COVID-19 outbreak and travel restrictions within Australia. The issue reached the floor of the Parliament of New South Wales when state politician Rose Jackson spoke in February 2021 on the missed opportunities for the local economy by the production leaving Australia, saying it was "sickening – and not in a good way".

RuPaul's Drag Race Down Under premiered on 1 May 2021. The winner of the first season was Auckland drag performer Kita Mean.

In its first three seasons, RuPaul played several roles on the show including host, mentor, and head judge for the series in a similar fashion to RuPaul's Drag Race UK. On 11 March 2024, World of Wonder announced that RuPaul had stepped down as host and judge of the show, but would remain on as executive producer. Michelle Visage took over as host and main judge from the fourth season, which premiered on 1 November 2024. Because of RuPaul’s exit as host and judge, the series was renamed Drag Race Down Under, similar to other Drag Race franchises where RuPaul is not the main host and judge.

== Format ==
Like the American version, the host has several roles within the show, including coach and judge to the contestants. The host introduces celebrity guests, announces the challenges the queens will take part in each week, and reveals who will be leaving the competition. In their role as a coach, the host offers guidance to the contestants through each challenge, and as a judge they critique the queens on their overall performance of the challenge. The show uses progressive elimination to reduce the number of drag queens in the competition from an initial field of contestants down to a final group. Each episode follows a format consisting of a mini challenge, a maxi challenge, a runway walk (where the contestants model fashion on a runway, usually with a theme based on the main challenge), the judging panel, a lip sync battle, and the elimination of a contestant.

=== Mini challenges ===
In mini challenges, each contestant is asked to perform a different task with varying requirements and time limitations. Certain mini challenges are repeated from series to series, or repeated from the original American season, for example, a photo shoot with a twist such as being doused with water while in full drag, having a high-powered fan turned on during the shoot, or being photographed while jumping on a trampoline. One recurring mini challenge is dedicated to "reading", a drag term for making insulting observations about one's peers for comedic effect, inspired by Paris Is Burning. The winner of a mini challenge is sometimes rewarded with an advantage in the main challenge. Though most episodes have a mini challenge, some episodes do not.

=== Maxi challenges and runways ===
The requirements of the maxi challenge vary across each episode, and can be individual or group challenges. The winner of the maxi challenge also receives a special prize for their win. The final maxi challenge often consists of the queens taking part in an all-singing and all-dancing routine to either an original song or a remix of a RuPaul song.

The goal of each maxi challenge involves a new theme and outcome. Contestants are often asked to design and construct a custom outfit, sometimes incorporating unconventional materials. Other challenges focus on the contestants' ability to present themselves on camera, perform with music, or perform humorously. Some challenges became a tradition across seasons, such as the "Snatch Game" (in which the contestants impersonate celebrities as a parody of Match Game), a ball or a makeover, in which the contestants create drag personas for other people. The contestants walk down a runway presenting outfits. If the maxi challenge involves the creation of an outfit, that outfit is presented to the judges in the runway. Otherwise, a theme is assigned and the contestants must put together a look that fits the theme, which is presented to the judges. The runway looks and presentation are judged along with the maxi challenge performance.

=== Judging panel ===
A panel of judges cast opinions about the challenge performances and runway looks, first to the contestants onstage, and then again with them offstage.

The first three seasons saw RuPaul act as both the host and main judge, with Michelle Visage and Rhys Nicholson as supporting judges. From season four, RuPaul stepped down from the show, Michelle Visage took over as host and main judge.

Judges on Drag Race Down Under
| Judge | Season | | | |
| Judge | 1 | 2 | 3 | 4 |
|---|---|---|---|---|
| RuPaul | Main | Main | Main | |
| Michelle Visage | Main | Main | Main | Main |
| Rhys Nicholson | Main | Main | Main | Main |
| Isis Avis Loren | | | | Main |
| Kita Mean | | | | Main |
| Spankie Jackzon | | | | Main |

=== Companion series ===
Several web series have accompanied different seasons of Rupaul's Drag Race Down Under:

- Fashion Photo RuView aired for the first season, co-hosted by Raja and Raven who evaluate the runway looks of the main show.
- How's Your Head, Queen? features Michelle Visage checking in with the newly eliminated queen to chat about their experience, their passions, the future, and more.
- Binge Queens with Kita Mean, Angeria Paris VanMicheals, Jasmine Kennedie and June Jambalaya who threw a couch kiki for a weekly watch party for season 2.

Companion series
| Show | Hosts | Season | | |
| Show | Hosts | 1 | 2 | 3 |
|---|---|---|---|---|
| Fashion Photo RuView | Raja and Raven | | | |
| How's Your Head, Queen? | Michelle Visage | | | |
| Bring Back My Girls | Ts Madison | | | |
| Binge Queens | Kita Mean & Angeria Paris VanMicheals; Jasmine Kennedie & June Jambalaya | | | |

== Series overview ==
| Season | Contestants | Episodes | Originally released | | Winner | Runner(s)-up |
| Season | Contestants | Episodes | First released | Last released | Winner | Runner(s)-up |
|---|---|---|---|---|---|---|
| 1 | 10 | 8 | 1 May 2021 | 19 June 2021 | Kita Mean | Art Simone; Karen from Finance; Scarlet Adams |
| 2 | 10 | 8 | 30 July 2022 | 17 September 2022 | Spankie Jackzon | Hannah Conda; Kween Kong |
| 3 | 10 | 8 | 28 July 2023 | 15 September 2023 | Isis Avis Loren | Gabriella Labucci |
| 4 | 10 | 8 | 1 November 2024 | 20 December 2024 | Lazy Susan | Mandy Moobs; Vybe |

=== Season 1 (2021) ===
The first season of RuPaul's Drag Race Down Under began airing on 1 May 2021 on Stan in Australia, TVNZ 2 in New Zealand and World of Wonder's WOW Presents Plus streaming service internationally, and ran for 8 episodes. Ten drag queens compete for the title of the "Down Under's first Drag Superstar", a one-year supply of Revolution Beauty Cosmetics, and a cash prize of A$30,000. The judging panel included RuPaul, Michelle Visage and Rhys Nicholson. The cast was announced on 6 March on YouTube. Art Simone, Karen from Finance, Kita Mean and Scarlet Adams made it to the final, with Kita Mean being crowned Down Under's first Drag Superstar.

=== Season 2 (2022) ===
A second season was announced on 9 September 2021. Casting opened the same day and closed on 5 October. TVNZ later confirmed that the network would again partner with Stan, World of Wonder, Passion Distribution, and Warner Bros. International Television Production New Zealand for another season of RuPaul's Drag Race Down Under due to film in New Zealand and premiere in 2022.

According to media reports, the season began filming on 18 January 2022 and was scheduled to run through to 14 February. Season 1 judges Michelle Visage and Rhys Nicholson were spotted in south Auckland around this time, leading to speculation that both would be returning to judge season 2.

The season premiered on July 30, 2022. The winner was Spankie Jackzon, with Hannah Conda and Kween Kong as runners-up.

=== Season 3 (2023) ===
The third season was confirmed and casting was opened on 24 October 2022. Casting closed on 13 November 2022. The season aired from 28 July to 15 September 2023 with Isis Avis Loren crowned the winner and Gabriella Labucci being runner-up.

=== Season 4 (2024) ===
The fourth season was confirmed and casting was opened on 24 October 2023. Casting closed on 11 November 2023. Season 4 was the first not to feature RuPaul as host, instead being led by Michelle Visage, and the series was renamed Drag Race Down Under. Lazy Susan won the season, with Mandy Moobs and Vybe as runners-up.

== Contestants ==
A total of 40 contestants have featured in Drag Race Down Under.

== Discography ==
List of singles
| Title | Season |
|---|---|
| "Queens Down Under" (Team "Three and a Half Men" & Team "Outback Fake Hoes") | 1 |
| "I'm a Winner Baby" (Cast Version) | 1 |
| "Bosom Buddies" (Team "BAB'Z" & Team "The Hung Divas") | 2 |
| "Who Is She" (Cast Version) | 2 |
| "BMX Bitches" (Team "F.A.B. International" & Team "Sexy N Stupid") | 3 |

== Awards and nominations ==
| Year | Award ceremony | Category | Nominees | Results | Ref. |
|---|---|---|---|---|---|
| 2021 | New Zealand Television Awards | Television Personality of the Year | RuPaul's Drag Race Down Under season 1 — Anita Wigl'it | Nominated | |
| 2022 | Australian Academy of Cinema and Television Arts (AACTA) Awards | Best Entertainment Program | RuPaul's Drag Race Down Under season 2 | Nominated | |
| 2023 | TV Week Logie Awards | Graham Kennedy Award for Most Popular New Talent | RuPaul's Drag Race Down Under season 2 — Kween Kong | Nominated | |
| 2023 | TV Week Logie Awards | Most Outstanding Entertainment Program | RuPaul's Drag Race Down Under season 2 | Nominated | |
