= Big Gay Out =

LGBTQ music festival in Auckland, New Zealand

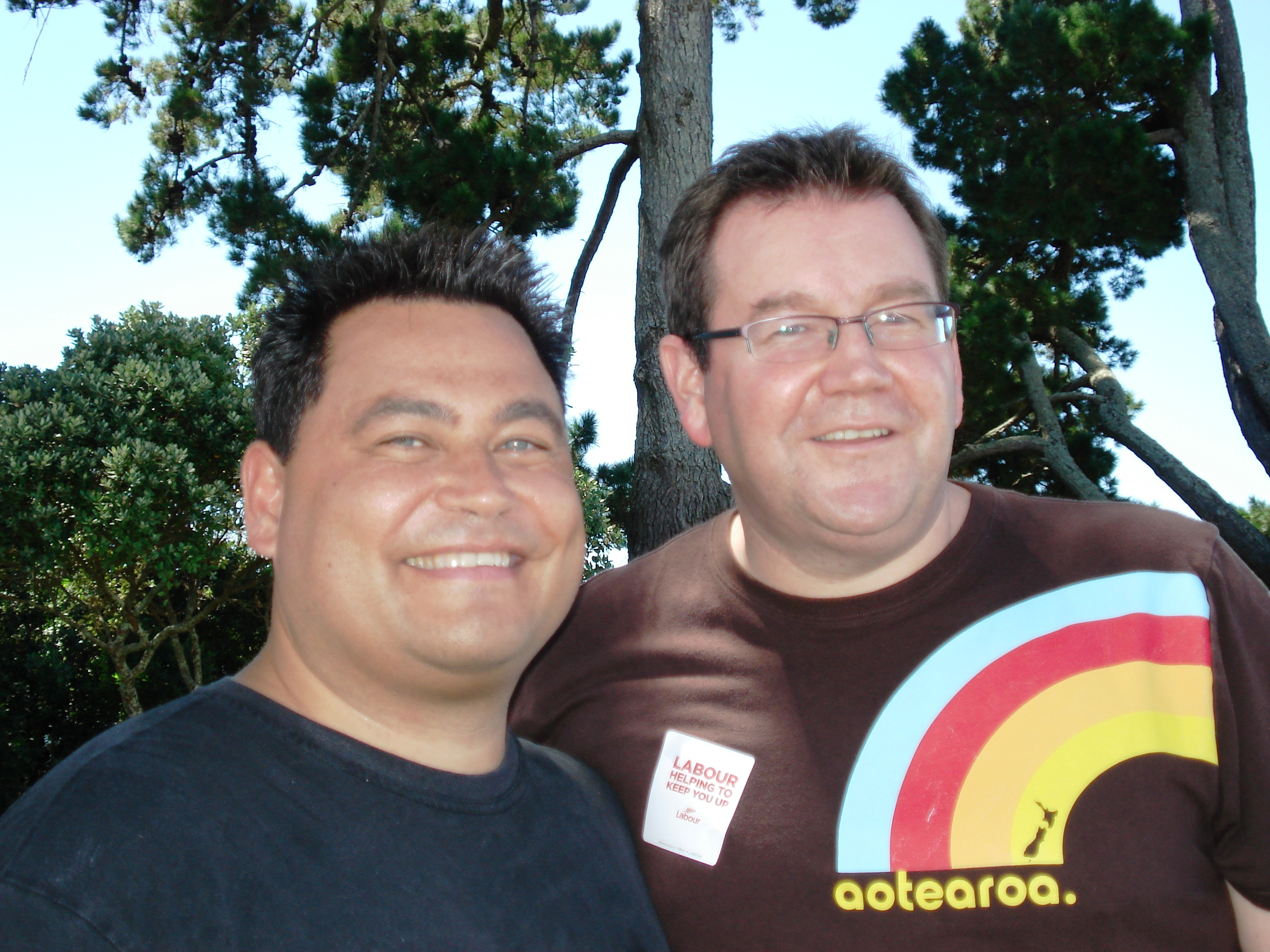
- Charles Chauvel and Grant Robertson at the Big Gay Out 2011
- Status: Active
- Genre: Festivals
- Frequency: Annually
- Location: Coyle Park
- Country: New Zealand
- Years active: 2000 - Present
- Inaugurated: 2000
- Founder: Hero Festival Big Gay Out
- Most recent: 12 March 2023
- Attendance: 10,000 - 15,000
- Organiser: Hero Festival (2000 - 2002); Burnett Foundation Aotearoa (2003 - Present)
- Sponsor: Durex
- Website: https://www.biggayout.co.nz/

Big Gay Out is an LGBTQ festival in New Zealand. It has been running in Auckland since 2000. The event was founded by the Hero Festival, but is now organised by Burnett Foundation Aotearoa.

During the event, Mr Gay New Zealand is chosen.

== History ==
The Big Gay Out was initiated by organisers of the Hero Festival, and was a play on words mimicking the music festival; Big Day Out. The event is always held at Coyle Park, in Point Chevalier. Organisers of the event stated that its location was intended to get back at former mayor Les Mills, who resided nearby and had a history of opposing pride events.

In 2003, leadership of the event passed from the Hero Festival to the NZ AIDS Foundation (now known as the Burnett Foundation Aotearoa). Since the changeover, the event has been used to promote HIV awareness and STI testing.

Several hundred people were in attendance at the first Big Gay Out in 2000. This figure has since increased to between 12,000 and 15,000 attendees.

=== Political influence ===
The Big Gay Out has always attracted political attention, with protests being common in the early years from fundamentalist Christian groups.

In 2004, whilst the New Zealand Government were considering introducing the Civil Unions Act, the Big Gay Out hosted a commitment ceremony where six gay couples exchanged rings. Auckland Mayor Dick Hubbard attended the Big Gay Out in 2005 and apologised for his past criticism of the civil union reforms.

In 2016, Prime Minister John Key made his annual appearance at the Big Gay Out, but was booed off stage by anti-Trans Pacific Partnership protesters. Despite the group of roughly 30 protesters, John Key received positive feedback for his attendance at the festival.

In 2024, Prime Minister Christopher Luxon was protested at the event by trans rights activists and pro-Palestine activists.

In January 2025, Burnett Foundation Aotearoa announced that MPs won't be taking the mainstage at the event “as organisers rethink how they engage with politicians.”

In 2026, the activist group Rainbow Action Tāmaki planned to "drown out the voices" of right-wing politicians speaking on the mainstage at the event. The comedian Janaye Henry withdrew from her scheduled performance, saying in an Instagram video, “I think it is irresponsible to platform someone who has caused grievous harm to the community on a day that is meant to be about celebration,”. Rainbow Action Tāmaki led chants including "National off the stage" and condemned the decision by Big Gay Out to "platform right-wing transphobic, racist, and genocide enabling politicians" at the event. The group held a banner reading "Drown out the voices that drowned out ours" and cardboard signs at the event included "Big Gay Out not bigot day out". Green Party co-leader Chlöe Swarbrick acknowledged the protest and said there was “a lot of righteous anger because people are aware of the things this Government has done”.

=== Postponements and cancellations ===
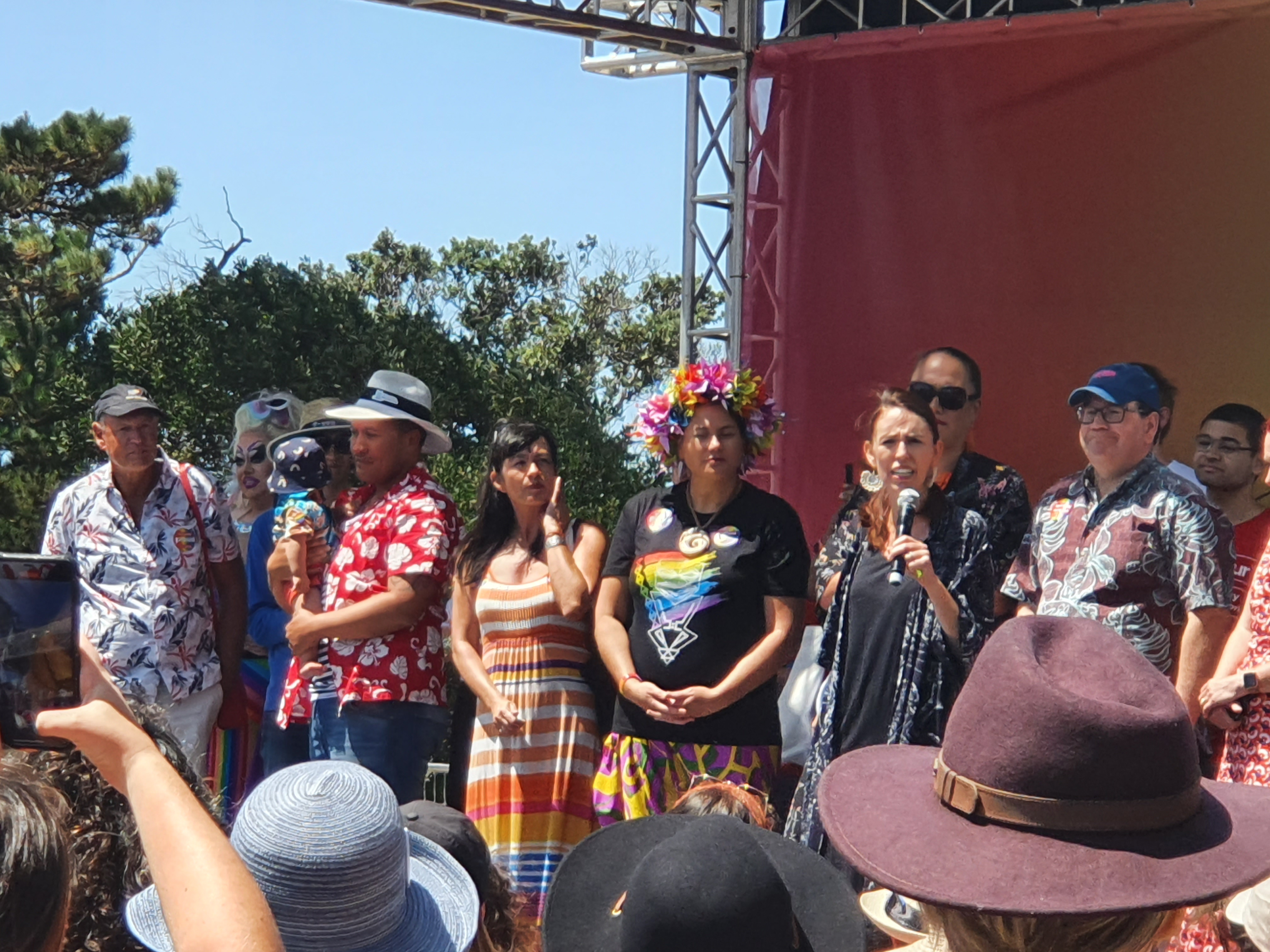
Members of the New Zealand Labour Party speaking at the 2020 Big Gay Out.

The 2018 Big Gay Out (scheduled for 11 February 2018) was cancelled due to severe weather conditions. This was the first cancellation in the history of the event.

Part-way through the Big Gay Out 2021, it was announced that three cases of COVID-19 had emerged in South Auckland. Mayor Phil Goff learned of the outbreak on his way to the event, but was advised that the event could continue. The following day, Auckland went into a three-day lockdown.

On 19 January 2022, it was announced that for the second time in Big Gay Out history, the event would be cancelled. This was due to the uncertainty of COVID-19 and the Omicron variant.

The Big Gay Out 2023 was postponed until 12 March due to flooding damage caused by Cyclone Gabrielle.

== Headlining Acts and Attendance ==
Year	Dates	Attendance	Headliners	Additional Notes
1999	February 1999	"a couple of hundred"	The Outrageous Miss Ribena	
2000	February 2000	"a couple of hundred"	The Outrageous Miss Ribena	
2001	Unknown	Unknown	Unknown	
2002	Unknown	Unknown	Unknown	
2003	16 February 2003	8,000 - 10,000	Unknown	
2004	8 February 2004	10,000	Unknown	
2005	Unknown	Unknown	Unknown	
2006	13 February 2006	Unknown	Miss K; Miss Buckwheat; Mahinārangi Tocker; The Morrisons	
2007	11 February 2007	12,000	Boyband; Mahinārangi Tocker; Kneel Halt; Buffy and Bimbo	
2008	10 February 2008	6,000 - 7,000	Miss Buckwheat; Cindy of Samoa; Pulse	Low attendance attributed to poor weather.
2009	8 February 2009	10,000	Razor; Queenie; Cindy Of Samoa	
2010	14 February 2010	12,000	Sarah Lambourne (Flirt); Opening Karakia; NZ Quilt Project; Tess Tickle; Dykes on Bikes; The Aroha Festival Launch!; Get it on! with your significant others; Kids & Dogs; Ramon; Steven Oates; Finale Restaurant & Cabaret; Urzila Carlson; Beaver Brown; Larry - 'Signing' Singer; Jock Swap & Underwear models; Caluzzi Bar & Cabaret; Sheba Withers; Tug of War; Brittany; Manu Dolls; LA Thompson & Christ Barclay; Cindy of Samoa; Olaf & Keishia - 'U Want Me'; Razor; Will C Barling & sexy DJ Stevolicious; Annie Crummer	
2011	13 February 2011	10,000	Anika Moa	
2012	12 February 2012	14,000	Zowie; Te Roopu Kapahaka o Hokianga; Lorraine Butler; Sheree Waitoa; Finale Cabaret; Pearls of Meganesianz; Ngaire & Noreen; Caluzzi Girls; Kamp David; D’mynority; DNA Spectacular; Titch Marvel & the Paparazzi Dolls; Razor; Manthyng; Petra and her Poi Mob	
2013	10 February 2013	15,000	Kids of 88; Brooke Duff; Maree Sheehan	
2014	9 February 2014	15,000	African Rhumba & Kwasa Kwasa; Ale Abud Held; Sonic Delusion; Mika X & The Aroha Project; Willie & Raymond; Sharvelle Charlotte; Charlotte Yates; Diamonds of Paradise; Fine Fatale; Kittens of the Internet; L.O.V.E; Family Bar Dragalicious; Lavina Williams; Legend Bar Showcase; LACE; Buckwheat & Tess Tickle; Urzila Carlson; Caluzzi Girls; Good Short; Cindy of Samoa	
2015	8 February 2015	12,000 - 15,000	Lavina Williams; Emily Williams; J. Williams; Brooke Duff; Pieter T; K.One	As part of the 'Love Your Condom' initiative, 20,000 condoms were distributed to the attendees and 209 people were tested for HIV.
2016	14 February 2016	10,000	Ahakoa Te Aha; Anita Wigl'it and Kita Mean; Rowan and Travis; Drag King Performance; TAPAC - Night of the Queer; Alex Farell-Davey; Mr Gay NZ Contestants - Question Time; Emily Kopp (USA); Ashley Tonga; Vallkyrie; Family Bar Showcase; Annie Crummer; Fine Fatale; Lavina Williams; Luke Bird; People Like Us (Musical Showcase); Samantha Jade (AUS); Cindy of Samoa	
2017	12 February 2017	Unknown	Openside; Cindy of Samoa; Parson James; Ahakoa Te Aha; Jimmy Moore & Cas.D; Tuhoi Henry; Lavina Williams; The Pop Tarts; Charlotte Yates; The Diamonds; ANJI	
2018	Cancelled	Cancelled	Cancelled	Cancelled
2019	10 February 2019	Unknown	Golfweather; Openside; Jon Lemmon; Julia Clement; LEXXA; The Miltones; Auckland Philharmonia Orchestra; White Chapel Jak; Burundian Drummers; Beth Goulstone; Iris G; Ahakoa Te Aha	
2020	9 February 2020	Unknown	Mika Haka; Courtney Act; Fortunes; Alae; Lizzie Marvelly; Randa; Hugo Grrrl; Medulla Oblongata; Kita Mean & Anita Wigl'it; Trinity Ice	
2021	14 February 2021	12,000 - 15,000	Chelsea Jade; Possum Plows + Maude Morris; Half Queen + Coven; Jordan Eskra; Theia; Paige; Lady Shaka; Jazo; Kirsty Sutherland; Nicola Tims; Marjorie Sinclair; Native Bush	
2022	Cancelled	Cancelled	Cancelled	Cancelled
2023	12 March 2023	Unknown	Theia; Brady Peeti; Hugo Grrl; VÏKÆ; Auckland Philharmonia Orchestra; DJ ZEKI; MC Manila	Postponed
2024	18 February 2024	Unknown	Parson James	
2024	16 February 2025	Unknown	Lagoon; Paige; Kira Puru; Tyrun; Venice Qin; Sheba; Ahakoa Te Aha; Janaye Henry; House of Givenchy Thirst Trap Ball; Auckland Pride Pre-Ball; DJ Jordan Eskra; Kita Mean	
2026	15 February 2026	Unknown	Jujulipps; Dr. D; VÏKAE; Kia Mean; Anita Wigl'it; DJ Jordan Eskra; Janaye Henry; Miss Ribena	

== Health promotion ==
Burnett Foundation Aotearoa also uses the Big Gay Out festival as an avenue to promote safe sex and develop condom culture in New Zealand. A survey administered during the 2012 Big Gay Out festival determined that those who stayed longer were more knowledgeable and positive toward condom culture and felt that the Get it on! message was an empowering one. Survey participants also said the programme "helped to educate men about safe sex" and "helped them feel good about having safe sex." In 2014, Get It On! was dropped and LYC was adopted as the main message. Love Your Condom (LYC) is New Zealand Aids Foundation's social marketing programme for gay and bisexual men. It addresses a complex mix of attitudinal, behavioural and social change amongst a community that can be difficult to define and reach. The LYC Social Marketing team talks about the programme's history, the challenges they face and what keeps them loving what they do. In 2017, New Zealand Aids Foundation dropped Love Your Condom and created a new campaign called Ending HIV. It has a goal of ending new HIV transmission in New Zealand by 2025. The campaign highlight key points including:

- Playing safe. Which means safe sex with the use of condoms and taking PrEP.
- Testing Often. Most HIV transmissions happen with people who do not know they have HIV and have unprotected sex. Testing often will diagnose people with HIV and get them onto treatment which will help stop spreading HIV.
- Treat Early. Treating early not only protects personal health, but it also reduces the chance of transmitting HIV to another person.
- Ending HIV Stigma. Stigma refers to prejudice and discrimination towards people living with HIV, their friends, partners and whānau. Even though HIV stigma was at its peak during the early days of the AIDS epidemic, many people living with HIV still experience prejudice on a daily basis.
