= RuPaul's Drag Race Down Under season 3 =

2023 season of RuPaul's Drag Race Down Under

RuPaul's Drag Race Down Under
- Season 3
- Promotional poster for season three
- Hosted by: RuPaul
- Judges: RuPaul; Michelle Visage; Rhys Nicholson
- No. of contestants: 10
- Winner: Isis Avis Loren
- Runner-up: Gabriella Labucci
- No. of episodes: 8

Release
- Original network: Stan (Australia); TVNZ+ (New Zealand); WOW Presents Plus (International)
- Original release: 28 July – 15 September 2023

Season chronology
- ← Previous; Season 2 Next → Season 4

The third season of RuPaul's Drag Race Down Under premiered on July 28, 2023, through Stan in Australia, TVNZ+ in New Zealand, and on WOW Presents Plus internationally. The season was confirmed by World of Wonder on October 24, 2022.

Isis Avis Loren won the season, becoming the first Australian queen to win in the franchise, with Gabriella Labucci as the runner-up.

== Background ==
On October 24, 2022, it was announced via the shows official Instagram page, that casting for the third season was now open. Applications remained open for four weeks until closing on November 13, 2022.

Ten contestants were announced on June 28, 2023. Participants include Flor, who previously appeared on season 2 of House of Drag, along with Down Under Season 2's winner, Spankie Jackzon and Season 1's Elektra Shock, which was a series hosted and judged by Down Under Season 1 contestants Anita Wigl'it and Kita Mean.

On July 19, 2023, it was announced via TVNZ's Instagram page the guest judges who, unlike the previous two seasons, would be featured at the judges' table throughout the series. This was the last season of the Down Under franchise being hosted by RuPaul, who would step down next year and Michelle Visage taking over as official host.

== Contestants ==
Ages, names, and cities stated are at time of filming.

Contestants of RuPaul's Drag Race Down Under season 3 and their backgrounds
Contestant	Age	Hometown	Outcome
Isis Avis Loren	33	Melbourne, Australia	Winner
Gabriella Labucci	31	Ballarat, Australia	Runner-up
Flor	25	Auckland, New Zealand	3rd place
Hollywould Star	34	Sydney, Australia	4th place
Bumpa Love	51	Melbourne, Australia	5th place
Ashley Madison	25	Melbourne, Australia	6th place
Rita Menu	24	Hamilton, New Zealand	7th place
Ivanna Drink	26	Auckland, New Zealand	8th place
Ivory Glaze	26	Sydney, Australia	9th place
Amyl	27	Sydney, Australia	10th place

== Contestant progress ==
Legend:

Isis Avis Loren won RuPaul's Drag Race Down Under season 3.
Gabriella Labucci was the runner-up.
WIN indicates that the contestant won the challenge.
SAFE indicates that the contestant was declared safe by the judges.
BTM (Bottom) indicates that the contestant was up for elimination.
ELIM (Eliminated) indicates that the contestant was eliminated.

Contestants progress with placements in each episode
Contestant	Episode							
Contestant	1	2 (Note: Ivory Glaze and Rita Menu placed in the bottom two on the second episode. However, due to Ivory fainting, the lip sync was postponed at the beginning of the following episode for safety reasons.)	3	4	5	6	7	8
Isis Avis Loren	SAFE	WIN	SAFE	SAFE	SAFE	WIN	WIN	Winner
Gabriella Labucci	SAFE	SAFE	WIN	SAFE	SAFE	BTM	BTM	Runner-up
Flor	SAFE	SAFE	SAFE	BTM	SAFE	SAFE	WIN	Eliminated
Hollywould Star	WIN	SAFE	SAFE	SAFE	WIN	SAFE	ELIM	
Bumpa Love	SAFE	SAFE	SAFE	SAFE	BTM	ELIM		
Ashley Madison	SAFE	SAFE	SAFE	WIN	ELIM			
Rita Menu	SAFE	BTM	BTM	ELIM				
Ivanna Drink	SAFE	SAFE	ELIM					
Ivory Glaze	BTM	ELIM						
Amyl	ELIM							

== Lip syncs ==
Legend:

The contestant was eliminated after their first time in the bottom.
The contestant was eliminated after their second time in the bottom.
The contestant was eliminated after their third time in the bottom.
The contestant won the Lip Sync for the Crown and was declared the winner of the season.

Episode	Contestants			Song	Eliminated
1	Amyl	vs.	Ivory Glaze	"Down Under" (Men at Work)	Amyl
3 (Note: Ivory Glaze and Rita Menu placed in the bottom two on the second episode. However, due to Ivory fainting, the lip sync was postponed to the beginning of the following episode for safety reasons.)	Ivory Glaze	vs.	Rita Menu	"Murder on the Dancefloor" (Sophie Ellis-Bextor)	Ivory Glaze
3	Ivanna Drink	vs.	Rita Menu	"Holding Out for a Hero" (Adam Lambert)	Ivanna Drink
4	Flor	vs.	Rita Menu	"Secrets" (Kylie Minogue)	Rita Menu
5	Ashley Madison	vs.	Bumpa Love	"Hot n Cold" (Katy Perry)	Ashley Madison
6	Bumpa Love	vs.	Gabriella Labucci	"Are You Gonna Be My Girl" (Jet)	Bumpa Love
7	Gabriella Labucci	vs.	Hollywould Star	"Not About You" (Haiku Hands)	Hollywould Star
Episode	Finalists			Song	Winner
8	Gabriella Labucci	vs.	Isis Avis Loren	"Walking on Broken Glass" (Annie Lennox)	Isis Avis Loren

== Guest judges ==
Listed in chronological order:

- Deva Mahal, American soul and R&B singer
- Maria Thattil, Australian author, media personality and Miss Universe 2020 contestant
- Adam Lambert, American singer and actor
- Keiynan Lonsdale, Australian actor, singer-songwriter and dancer
- Rachel Hunter, New Zealand model and actress
- Amy Taylor, Australian singer and vocalist of Amyl and the Sniffers
- Josh Cavallo, Australian professional football player

=== Special guests ===
Guests who appeared in episodes, but did not judge on the main stage.

Episode 2

- Raven, runner-up of both RuPaul's Drag Race Season 2 and All Stars Season 1

Episode 4

- Max Currie, director and screenwriter and RuPaul's Drag Race Down Under Season 1 Pit Crew

Episode 5

- Corey Baker, choreographer, film director and former dancer

Episode 6

- Bree Tomasel, radio host

Episode 7

- Norvina, president of Anastasia Beverly Hills

Episode 8

- Kween Kong, runner-up on RuPaul's Drag Race Down Under Season 2
- Spankie Jackzon, winner of House of Drag Season 2 and RuPaul's Drag Race Down Under Season 2

== Episodes ==
No. overall	No. in season	Title	Original release date
17	1	"Mardi Gras Pride"	28 July 2023
Ten new queens enter the werkroom. For this week's main challenge, the queens write, record, and perform verses to a mashup of RuPaul's "Super Queen" and "Sissy That Walk". On the runway, category is Somewhere Under the Rainbow. Flor, Gabriella Labucci and Hollywould Star receive positive critiques, with Hollywould Star winning the challenge. Amyl, Ashley Madison and Ivory Glaze receive negative critiques, with Ashley Madison being safe. Amyl and Ivory Glaze lip-sync to "Down Under" by Men at Work. Ivory Glaze wins the lip-sync and Amyl is the first queen to sashay away.: Guest Judge: Deva Mahal; Main Challenge: Write, record, and perform verses to a mashup of RuPaul's "Super Queen" and "Sissy That Walk"; Runway Theme: Somewhere Under the Rainbow; Challenge Winner: Hollywould Star; Challenge Prize: A custom prosthetics valued at $3,500; Bottom Two: Amyl and Ivory Glaze; Lip-Sync Song: "Down Under" by Men at Work; Eliminated: Amyl; Farewell Message: "Glad I got to be here while we all loosened up and got to know each other! See you soon, xoxo Amyl ♡"
18	2	"Muriel's Bedding"	4 August 2023
For this week's mini-challenge, the queens do a boudoir photoshoot. Gabriella Labucci wins the mini-challenge. For the main challenge, the queens create an outfit made out of leftover bedding materials. On the runway, category is Muriel's Bedding. Bumpa Love, Hollywould Star and Isis Avis Loren receive positive critiques, with Isis Avis Loren winning the challenge. Ivanna Drink, Ivory Glaze and Rita Menu receive negative critiques, with Ivanna Drink being safe. Before the lip-sync begins, Ivory Glaze passes out on the main stage. After making the necessary medical determinations, RuPaul announces that the elimination will be postponed until the next episode.: Guest Judge: Maria Thattil; Mini-Challenge: Boudoir photoshoot; Mini-Challenge Winner: Gabriella Labucci; Mini-Challenge Prize: A custom jewelry set and a $1,000 gift card courtesy of Amped Accessories; Main Challenge: Create an outfit made out of leftover bedding materials; Runway Theme: Muriel's Bedding; Challenge Winner: Isis Avis Loren; Challenge Prize: A $2,000 gift card courtesy of Shoe Me; Bottom Two: Ivory Glaze and Rita Menu; Eliminated: None
19	3	"Fake Housewives of Down Under"	11 August 2023
Picking up from the events of the previous episode, Ivory Glaze and Rita Menu lip-sync to "Murder on the Dancefloor" by Sophie Ellis-Bextor. Rita Menu wins the lip-sync and Ivory Glaze sashays away.: Bottom Two: Ivory Glaze and Rita Menu; Lip-Sync Song: "Murder on the Dancefloor" by Sophie Ellis-Bextor; Eliminated: Ivory Glaze; For this week's main challenge, the queens team up and improvise in the new reunion special of The Fake Housewives of Down Under.: Team Isis Avis Loren - Gabriella Labucci, Hollywould Star, Isis Avis Loren and Ivanna Drink; Team Rita Menu - Ashley Madison, Bumpa Love, Flor and Rita Menu; On the runway, category is Bad Girls Gone Bad. Bumpa Love, Flor, Gabriella Labucci and Isis Avis Loren receive positive critiques, with Gabriella Labucci winning the challenge. Ivanna Drink and Rita Menu receive negative critiques, and are announced as the bottom two. Ivanna Drink and Rita Menu lip-sync to "Holding Out For A Hero" by Adam Lambert. Rita Menu wins the lip-sync and Ivanna Drink sashays away.: Guest Judge: Adam Lambert; Main Challenge: In teams, improvise in the new reunion special of "The Fake Housewives of Down Under"; Runway Theme: Bad Girls Gone Bad; Challenge Winner: Gabriella Labucci; Challenge Prize: A $5,000 gift card courtesy of Vacaya; Bottom Two: Ivanna Drink and Rita Menu; Lip-Sync Song: "Holding Out For A Hero" by Adam Lambert; Eliminated: Ivanna Drink; Farewell Message: "To all my sisters! I love you all so much! I'm going to miss you all and can't wait to see how you all do! See you on the outside! Give it your all and be happy with what you put out there! All my love, Ivanna 💋 xxx"
20	4	"Snatch Game - Down Under Season 3"	18 August 2023
For this week's mini-challenge, the queens have to find matching pairs of the pit crew's underwear. Gabriella Labucci wins the mini-challenge. For the main challenge, the queens play the Snatch Game. Keiynan Lonsdale and Max Currie star as the celebrity contestants. The cast consisted of: Ashley Madison as Jesus Christ; Bumpa Love as Kiri Te Kanawa; Flor as Charo; Gabriella Labucci as Emma Watkins; Hollywould Star as Naomi Campbell; Isis Avis Loren as Donatella Versace; Rita Menu as Cardi B; On the runway, category is Night of a Thousand Kylie Minogue's. Ashley Madison and Isis Avis Loren receive positive critiques, with Ashley Madison winning the challenge. Bumpa Love, Flor and Rita Menu receive negative critiques, with Bumpa Love being safe. Flor and Rita Menu lip-sync to "Secrets" by Kylie Minogue. Flor wins the lip-sync and Rita Menu sashays away.: Guest Judge: Keiynan Lonsdale; Mini-Challenge: Find matching pairs of pit crew's underwear; Mini-Challenge Winner: Gabriella Labucci; Mini-Challenge Prize: A Singer C430 sewing machine; Main Challenge: Snatch Game; Runway Theme: Night of a Thousand Kylie Minogue's; Challenge Winner: Ashley Madison; Challenge Prize: A $3,000 cash tip courtesy of Team Mate; Bottom Two: Flor and Rita Menu; Lip-Sync Song: "Secrets" by Kylie Minogue; Eliminated: Rita Menu; Farewell Message: "I love you all so sooo much!!! 💋 Go for Gold ♡ xoxo ♡ Rita Menu"
21	5	"BMX Bitches"	25 August 2023
For this week's mini-challenge, the queens read each other to filth. No one wins the mini-challenge. For the main challenge, the queens write, record, and perform verses to "BMX Bitches".: Team F.A.B International - Ashley Madison, Bumpa Love and Flor; Team SNS (Sexy n Stupid) - Gabriella Labucci, Hollywould Star and Isis Avis Loren; On the runway, category is Fuchsia? I Don't Even Know Her. Team SNS (Sexy n Stupid) is the winning team, with Hollywould Star winning the challenge. Team F.A.B International is the losing team, with Ashley Madison and Bumpa Love being announced as the bottom two. They lip-sync to "Hot n Cold" by Katy Perry. Bumpa Love wins the lip-sync and Ashley Madison sashays away.: Guest Judge: Rachel Hunter; Mini-Challenge: Reading is Fundamental; Mini-Challenge Winner: None; Main Challenge: Write, record, and perform verses to "BMX Bitches"; Runway Theme: Fuchsia? I Don't Even Know Her; Challenge Winner: Hollywould Star; Challenge Prize: A $5,000 cash tip; Bottom Two: Ashley Madison and Bumpa Love; Lip-Sync Song: "Hot n Cold" by Katy Perry; Eliminated: Ashley Madison; Farewell Message: "Cheers xoxo Ash"
22	6	"Drag Brunch"	1 September 2023
For this week's main challenge, the queens perform a talent show in front of the judges.: Bumpa Love - Stand-up comedy; Flor - Educational comedy performance; Gabriella Labucci - Slapstick comedy; Hollywould Star - Original song; Isis Avis Loren - Lip-syncing/fan dance; On the runway, category is Not in My Backyard Barbecue. Flor and Isis Avis Loren receive positive critiques, with Isis Avis Loren winning the challenge. Bumpa Love and Gabriella Labucci receive negative critiques, and are announced as the bottom two. They lip-sync to "Are You Gonna Be My Girl" by Jet. Gabriella Labucci wins the lip-sync and Bumpa Love sashays away.: Guest Judge: Amy Taylor; Main Challenge: Perform a talent show in front of the judges; Runway Theme: Not in My Backyard Barbecue; Challenge Winner: Isis Avis Loren; Challenge Prize: A $2,500 Voucher courtesy of Wigged Out; Bottom Two: Bumpa Love and Gabriella Labucci; Lip-Sync Song: "Are You Gonna Be My Girl" by Jet; Eliminated: Bumpa Love; Farewell Message: "My darlings, you're all bitches, but I love you always. Call me if you need work assholes. Bumpa xox"
23	7	"Terriers in Tiaras"	8 September 2023
For this week's main challenge, the queens makeover dog owners and their dogs. On the runway, category is Drag Family Resemblance: Doggy Style. Flor and Isis Avis Loren receive positive critiques, with both queens winning the challenge. Gabriella Labucci and Hollywould Star receive negative critiques, and are announced as the bottom two. They lip-sync to "Not About You" by Haiku Hands. Gabriella Labucci wins the lip-sync and Hollywould Star sashays away.: Guest Judge: Josh Cavallo; Main Challenge: Makeover dog owners and their dogs; Runway Theme: Drag Family Resemblance: Doggy Style; Challenge Winners: Flor and Isis Avis Loren; Challenge Prize: A $2,500 cash tip courtesy of Anastasia Beverly Hills; Bottom Two: Gabriella Labucci and Hollywould Star; Lip-Sync Song: "Not About You" by Haiku Hands; Eliminated: Hollywould Star; Farewell Message: "Good luck, girls. Love you forever. Hollywould oxo"
24	8	"Grand Finale - Down Under Season 3"	15 September 2023
For the final challenge of the season, the queens write, record and perform their own verses to a remix of RuPaul's song "Crying on the Dance Floor". On the runway, category is Finale Eleganza Extravaganza. Flor is eliminated, leaving Gabriella Labucci and Isis Avis Loren as the top two queens of the season. They lip-sync to "Walking on Broken Glass" by Annie Lennox. It is announced that Isis Avis Loren is the winner, leaving Gabriella Labucci as the runner-up.: Main Challenge: Write, record and perform their own verses to a remix of RuPaul's song "Crying on the Dance Floor"; Runway Theme: Finale Eleganza Extravaganza; Eliminated: Flor; Lip-Sync Song: "Walking on Broken Glass" by Annie Lennox; Runner-up: Gabriella Labucci; Winner of RuPaul's Drag Race Down Under Season Three: Isis Avis Loren
