= Gabriella Labucci =

Australian drag performer

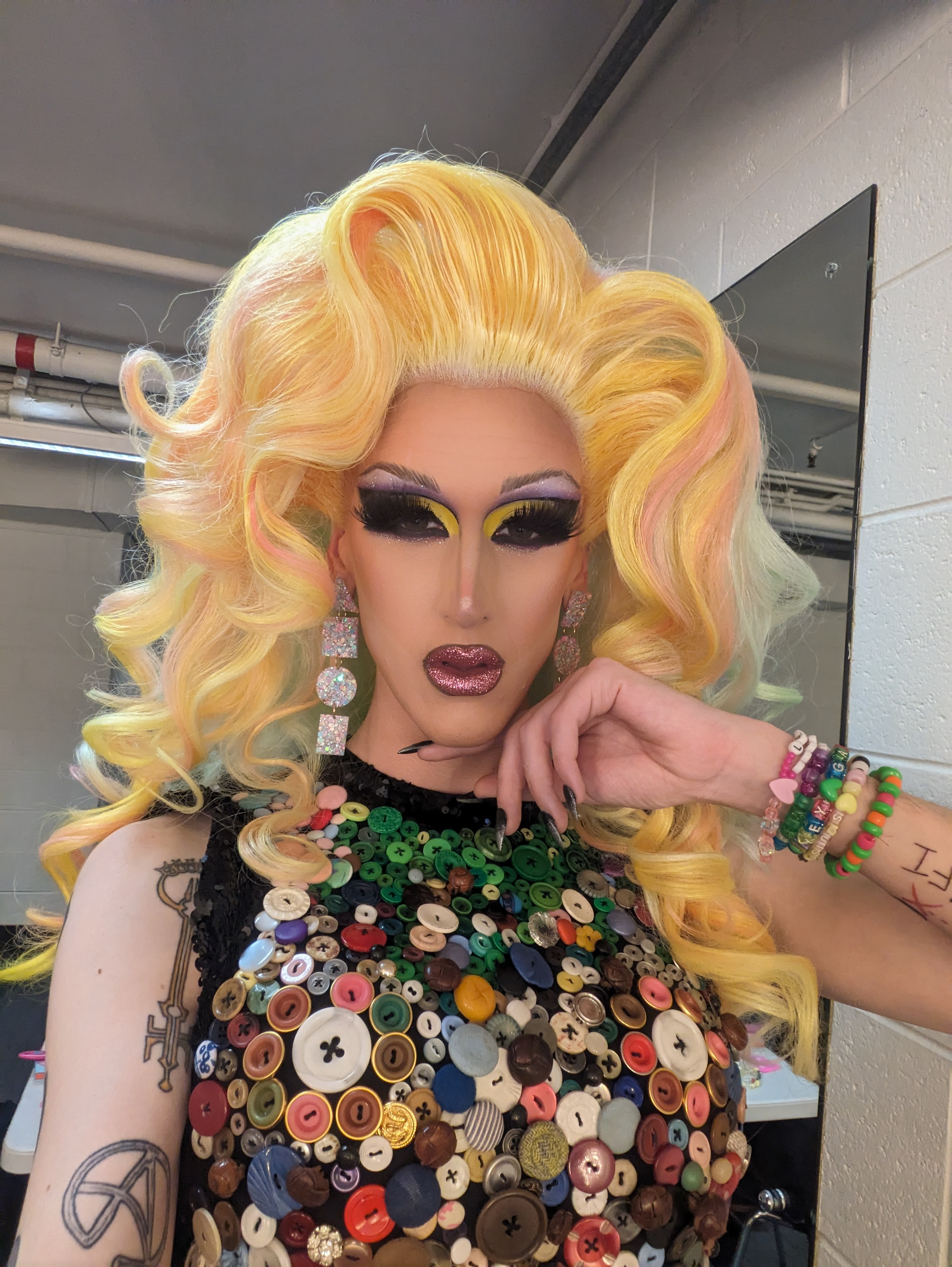
- Gabriella Labucci in 2023
- Born: 1991 or 1992 (age 33–34)
- Television: Lance TV Ballarat; RuPaul's Drag Race Down Under (season 3)
- Website: gabriellalabucci.square.site

Gabriella Labucci is an Australian drag performer most known for competing on the third season of RuPaul's Drag Race Down Under.

== Career ==
Gabriella Labucci is a drag performer who has also worked at Piano Bar and appeared on Lance TV Ballarat. She and Lance De Boyle hosted the Channel 31 Antenna Awards in 2021. Gabriella Labucci was inspired to start doing drag by the American television series RuPaul's Drag Race, and later competed on the third season of the spin-off series RuPaul's Drag Race Down Under.

Labucci opened the Werq the World Tour along with Flor, Isis Avis Loren and Hollywould Star for the Australian leg of the 2023 production.

== Personal life ==
Gabriella Labucci is based in Ballarat, Victoria, and prefers the pronouns she/her in drag and he/him out of drag.

== Filmography ==
=== Television ===
- Lance TV Ballarat
- RuPaul's Drag Race Down Under (season 3)

== See also ==
- List of people from Ballarat
