= Rita Menu =

New Zealand drag performer

- Born: 1998 or 1999 (age 25–26)
- Television: RuPaul's Drag Race Down Under (season 3)

Rita Menu (born 1998 or 1999) is a New Zealand drag performer who competed on season 3 of RuPaul's Drag Race Down Under.

== Career ==
Rita Menu is a drag performer. She won Kita Mean and Anita Wigl'it's "Drag Wars" competition. In 2019, Logo TV's Michael Musto included Rita Menu in a list of the 250 best drag names.

Rita Menu competed on season 3 of RuPaul's Drag Race Down Under, placing seventh overall. She is among the only contestants in the Drag Race franchise to eliminate two competitors in a single episode; Rita Menu eliminated Ivory Glaze and Ivanna Drink in lip-syncs to "Murder on the Dancefloor" (2001) by Sophie Ellis-Bextor and "Holding Out for a Hero" by Adam Lambert, respectively. On the fourth episode, Rita Menu impersonated Cardi B for the Snatch Game challenge. Her performance landed her in the bottom two, and she lost a lip-sync against Flor to "Secrets" by Kylie Minogue. One of her looks on the show paid homage to the character Riff Raff from The Rocky Horror Picture Show.

== Personal life ==
Rita Menu was raised in Hamilton, New Zealand. Rita Menu uses the pronouns she/her in drag and he/him out of drag.

== Filmography ==
=== Television ===
- RuPaul's Drag Race Down Under (season 3)
