= Hot n Cold =

2008 single by Katy Perry

Single by Katy Perry

from the album One of the Boys
- Released: September 9, 2008
- Recorded: December 2007
- Studio: Dr. Luke's Studios; Legacy Recording (New York City); Conway Recording Studios (Hollywood, California, US)
- Genre: Bubblegum pop; dance-pop; disco; pop rock
- Length: 3:40
- Label: Capitol
- Songwriters: Katy Perry; Lukasz Gottwald; Max Martin
- Producers: Dr. Luke; Benny Blanco

Katy Perry singles chronology
"I Kissed a Girl" (2008)	"Hot n Cold" (2008)	"Thinking of You" (2009)

Music video
- "Hot n Cold" on YouTube

"Hot n Cold" is a song by American singer Katy Perry from her second studio album, One of the Boys (2008). She and Max Martin co-wrote the song with its producer Dr. Luke, with additional production from Benny Blanco. The track was recorded in December 2007 at Dr. Luke's Studios and Legacy Recordings, both based in New York City, New York, and Conway Recording Studios, based in Hollywood, Los Angeles. "Hot n Cold" was released as the album's second single on September 9, 2008, and was the first single to be released after the album. "Hot n Cold" is primarily a bubblegum pop, dance-pop, disco, and pop rock record with elements of power pop and electronic rock, and its lyrics address an unstable romantic relationship caused by a partner's mood swings.

"Hot n Cold" charted at number one in Austria, Belgium, Canada, Chile, the Czech Republic, Denmark, Finland, Germany, Hungary, the Netherlands, Norway, Poland, Romania, Slovakia, and Switzerland as well as the top five in Australia, Bulgaria, Iceland, Ireland, Israel, New Zealand, Sweden, the United Kingdom, and the United States. It additionally was certified diamond in Australia, Brazil, Canada, and France as well as multi-platinum in Denmark, New Zealand, Norway, the United Kingdom, and the United States. "Hot n Cold" is one of eight songs by Perry to sell over 4 million digital copies in the US, the others being "I Kissed a Girl", "California Gurls", "Teenage Dream", "Firework", "E.T.", "Dark Horse" and "Roar". Globally, the song has sold 11.79 million digital downloads.

The first live performance of "Hot n Cold" was on NBC's Today. Alan Ferguson directed an accompanying music video, which was released on October 1, 2008. It features Perry as a bride who is about to marry her fiancé, who experiences a daydream in which she pursues him after he flees from the wedding. "Hot n Cold" was nominated for the Grammy Award for Best Female Pop Vocal Performance at the 52nd Annual Grammy Awards. Perry has also performed the song on the Hello Katy Tour, the California Dreams Tour, the Prismatic World Tour, Witness: The Tour, Play, and the Lifetimes Tour.

The song has been included in games such as The Sims 2: Apartment Life and the first Just Dance, and shows such as MasterChef Australia and RuPaul's Drag Race Down Under, alongside Perry's concert film The Prismatic World Tour Live. A parody of the song was planned to appear in Sesame Street, but the segment was left unaired due to controversy relating to Perry's cleavage.

== Background and composition ==
"Hot n Cold" was written by Perry, Dr. Luke, and Max Martin and produced by Dr. Luke with an additional production from Benny Blanco. It was recorded in December 2007 in three studios: Dr. Luke's Studios in New York City, Conway Recording Studio in Hollywood, California, and Legacy Recording Studios in New York City. It was mixed in MixStar Studios in Virginia Beach. The collaboration between Perry and Dr. Luke was set up by record executives at Capitol Records, who felt that One of the Boys was lacking an "undeniable smash or two", and the two co-wrote "I Kissed a Girl" and "Hot n Cold" as a result. Perry revealed that the song was originally considered for release as the album's first single, before "I Kissed a Girl" was chosen.

"Hot n Cold" is a bubblegum pop, dance-pop, disco, and pop rock song with elements of power pop and electronic rock. The song utilizes guitars and synthesizers. Written in the verse-chorus form. It has a length of three minutes and forty seconds (3:40), and runs at a moderately fast tempo of 132 beats per minute in the key of G major. The lyrics of the song address a lover of Perry whose mood swings are affecting the couple's relationship. The song opens with Perry confronting her former partner over his frequent changes of mind, singing "You change your mind like a girl changes clothes / Yeah you PMS / Like a bitch, I would know". In the chorus, she uses antonyms to describe her partner's mood changes, with the chorus of the song including the lines, "You're hot then you're cold / You're yes then you're no / You're in then you're out / You're up then you're down".

== Critical reception ==
Alex Fletcher of Digital Spy gave the song three out of five stars, saying "this track doesn't live up to the hype surrounding its singer, but the choppy guitars and whooshing synths have a certain charm." In his review for musicOMH, Darren Harvey called "Hot n Cold" a "Tiffany-style '80s pop number". ChartAttack noted the "frenetic dance-pop" of the track. In a less positive review, Sal Cinquemani from Slant Magazine criticized the song, saying "Perry confuses political incorrectness with being subversive on tracks like 'Hot n Cold', in which she, in the process of skewering guys who change their minds 'like girls change clothes', just winds up sounding mildly sexist." Jon Caramanica of The New York Times compared the song to "U + Ur Hand" by Pink, which was also produced by Dr. Luke, saying that it does not share the latter's "passion". Lizzie Ennever of BBC felt the track was not "the most single-worthy song". The Guardian wrote that the song "didn't seem to capture the public's imagination" the way her previous single "I Kissed a Girl" did. The song was nominated for the Grammy Award for Best Female Pop Vocal Performance at the 52nd Annual Grammy Awards, but lost to Beyoncé's "Halo".

== Commercial performance ==
"Hot n Cold" debuted on the US Billboard Hot 100 at number 88 on the chart dated July 5, 2008, due to strong digital downloads after the album's release, falling off the chart the next week. It re-entered the Hot 100 on August 23, again at number 88. The song peaked at number three on the Hot 100 on November 22, making it her second top-three hit after "I Kissed a Girl". "Hot n Cold" was in the top ten for 18 weeks, spending more time in the top ten than Perry's previous single "I Kissed a Girl", which spent 14 weeks. The song was also a bigger radio hit than "I Kissed a Girl", becoming Perry's first number one on both US Mainstream Top 40 and Adult Top 40 radio charts. It remained in the Hot 100 for a total of 39 weeks. As of August 2020, "Hot n Cold" has been certified eight times platinum by the Recording Industry Association of America (RIAA) and sold 5.8 million copies in the United States, making it Perry's sixth best-selling single in the country.

In Canada, the song debuted at number 73 and reached the number one position on the chart on November 20. It was later certified nine times platinum. The song peaked at number four on the UK Singles Chart on December 7, and was certified double platinum. "Hot n Cold" debuted on the German Singles Chart at number two due to strong digital download sales, before topping the chart and spending eight consecutive weeks at number one in Germany. In Australia, the single debuted in the top 50, before reaching its peak at number four. It has since been certified eight times platinum in the country. The song peaked at number one in the Czech Republic and spent ten consecutive weeks at the top of the chart. "Hot n Cold" reached the number one position in Denmark, later being certified two-times-platinum, and hit number one in Austria before being certified platinum.

As of July 2021, "Hot n Cold" has sold 11.79 million digital downloads worldwide.

== Music video ==
Perry corners Alexander leading a zebra on a leash, before he awakens from his daydream

The video begins with Perry at a wedding, about to exchange vows with her diffident fiancé Alexander (played by actor/model Alexander Francis Rodriguez). Perry says her vows, but Alexander hesitates and the church anxiously waits for him to say "I do". Perry appears frustrated and the music begins to play, with the congregation dancing as disco lights flash. Perry begins to sing the song to Alexander before he flees the altar. She pursues him, and they proceed to play a cat-and-mouse game. Perry corners him in a warehouse, and Alexander is pulled into an audience and forced to crowd-surf while watching Perry perform the song on stage. He manages to escape but walks out to find Perry in her wedding dress surrounded by several other brides carrying baseball bats. Perry confronts him, but he is able to get away.

Perry and the other brides chase after him. When Alexander pulls out his phone, Perry is on the screen singing to him. He flees the warehouse and finds Perry outside wearing urban clothing, surrounded by dancers dressed similarly. When he turns around, he discovers that he has been cornered by Perry and the group of angry brides. He stumbles and the dancers surround him as he lies on the ground, before Perry approaches him leading a zebra on a leash. Alexander blinks and finds himself back at the altar in the church, revealing that the previous events were just a daydream. The priest asks him again if he accepts his vows, and this time he says "I do". The crowd in the church breaks out into cheers and sighs of relief as Perry runs victoriously down the aisle with him.

Perry's friends Jadyn Maria and Shannon Woodward appear in the music video as bridesmaids, and her parents Keith and Mary Hudson also make cameos. The video for "Hot n Cold" was recorded in Los Angeles in September 2008 and released on October 1, 2008. It was directed by Alan Ferguson. Rolling Stone described the music video as "a colorful cat-and-mouse chase that's equal parts goofy and glam." Capital FM wrote that the video "had us in stitches". The music video reached over 1 billion views on YouTube as of November 2020.

== Live performances ==
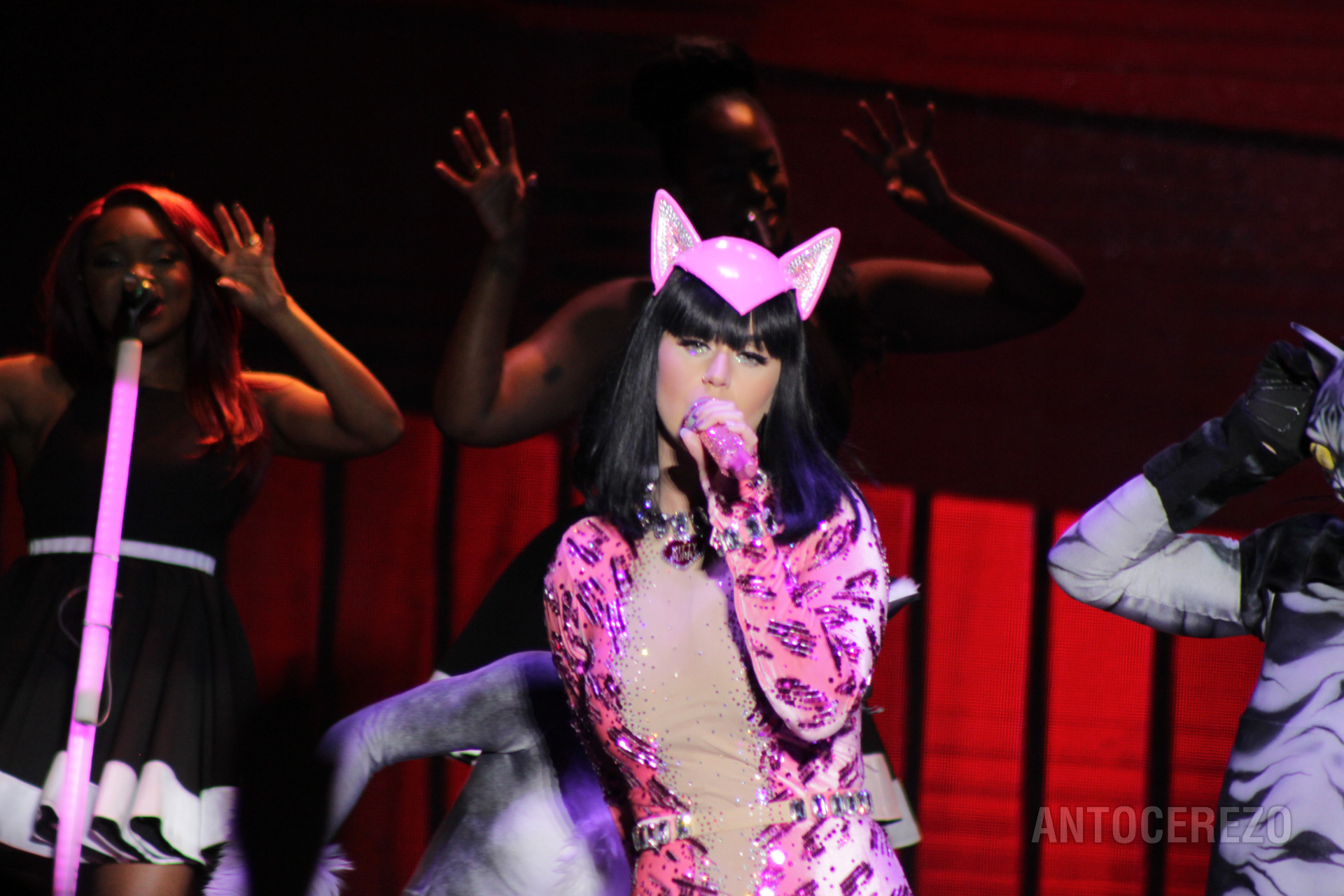
Perry performing "Hot n Cold" during Prismatic World Tour

Perry made the live television premiere performance of "Hot n Cold" on NBC's Today on August 29, 2008. Perry performed the song live at the 2008 MTV Europe Music Awards in Liverpool, which she also hosted, on November 6 to close the show. The song was also performed as the opener at the 2008 YouTube Live event on November 22, 2008. She zalso included the song in the setlists for the Hello Katy Tour, the California Dreams Tour, and The Prismatic World Tour. During the California Dreams Tour, Perry performed a "magic trick" that involved her changing into 7 different outfits during the number. Perry performed the song on her The Prismatic World Tour in a slow jazz version with her dressing in a pink-catsuit with her dancers dressed in a similar way. It was also part of the setlist of Perry's Witness: The Tour in a medley with "Last Friday Night (T.G.I.F)", a song from her album Teenage Dream. This song will once again be on her setlist for The Lifetimes Tour (2025).

== Usage in media ==
The song made its digital debut in the expansion pack of the popular video game, The Sims 2: Apartment Life, released in 2008. Perry lent her voice to record a special version of the track in "Simlish", the fictional language of The Sims universe. This unique rendition of the song can be heard on the in-game radio station, adding a touch of mainstream music to the Sims' everyday virtual life. The song (named the "Chick Version" specifically) was also used in a dance routine for the video game Just Dance, which is part of the music video game series of the same name. The installment is specifically the first in the series, and her music would later appear in 9 more installments from the main series.

Perry filmed a performance of a version of the song with puppet character Elmo from the educational children's program Sesame Street, which was intended to teach children about antonyms. The clip was originally scheduled to run during the Sesame Street episode "Abby Tries & Tries Again" on December 31, 2010, however, the performance, which was uploaded to YouTube earlier, garnered controversy over the amount of cleavage Perry had on display in the video. Before the scheduled airing, Sesame Workshop announced that after controversy over the clip, "We have decided we will not air the segment on the television broadcast of Sesame Street, which is aimed at preschoolers. Katy Perry fans will still be able to view the video on YouTube." Perry mocked the controversy shortly afterward in a skit during her appearance on Saturday Night Live as a musical guest, wearing an Elmo-themed shirt which showed large amounts of cleavage.

The song was used as the theme music for MasterChef Australia and its associated TV ads. "Hot n Cold" was also used as the Lip Sync for Your Life song on the fifth episode of the third season of RuPaul's Drag Race Down Under in 2023, between contestants Ashley Madison and Bumpa Love.

== Track listing ==
CD Single

1. "Hot n Cold" (Album Version) – 3:40
2. "Hot n Cold" (Instrumental) – 3:40
3. "Hot n Cold" (A Cappella) – 3:34
4. "Hot n Cold" (Rock Mix) – 3:41
5. "Hot n Cold" (Innerpartysystem Remix) – 4:40
6. "Hot n Cold" (Bimbo Jones Radio Edit) – 3:50
7. "Hot n Cold" (Manhattan Clique Radio Edit) – 3:54
8. "Hot n Cold" (Jason Nevins Radio Edit) – 3:57

== Remixes ==
Almighty Mixes

- "Hot n Cold" (Almighty 12" Anthem Mix) – 8:00
- "Hot n Cold" (Almighty 12" Anthem Instrumental) – 8:00
- "Hot n Cold" (Almighty 12" Anthem Dub) – 7:14
- "Hot n Cold" (Almighty Anthem Radio Edit) – 4:01

Bimbo Jones Mixes

- "Hot n Cold" (Bimbo Jones Club Mix) – 8:02
- "Hot n Cold" (Bimbo Jones Instrumental) – 8:10
- "Hot n Cold" (Bimbo Jones Radio Edit) – 3:50

Manhattan Clique Mixes

- "Hot n Cold" (Manhattan Clique Extended Club Mix) – 4:40
- "Hot n Cold" (Manhattan Clique Radio Edit) – 3:54

Jason Nevins Mixes

- "Hot n Cold" (Jason Nevins Club Mix) – 7:21
- "Hot n Cold" (Jason Nevins Radio Edit) – 3:57

Dr. Luke Mix

- "Hot n Cold" (Rock Mix) – 3:41

Innerpartysystem Mix

- "Hot n Cold" (Innerpartysystem Remix) – 4:40

Marsheaux Mix

- "Hot n Cold" (Marsheaux Remix) – 4:23

Yelle Mix

- "Hot n Cold" (Yelle Remix) – 4:07

== Credits and personnel ==
Credits adapted from One of the Boys album liner notes.

- Katy Perry – vocals, songwriter
- Dr. Luke – producer, songwriter, programmer, bass, drums, guitar
- Max Martin – songwriter, guitars
- Benny Blanco – additional producer, programmer, drums
- Steven Wolf – programming
- Şerban Ghenea – mixing
- John Hanes – mix engineer
- Emily Wright – engineer
- Sam Holland – engineer
- Nick Banns – engineer
- Tatiana Gottwald – engineer
- Tina Kennedy – engineer

== Charts ==
=== Weekly charts ===
Weekly chart performance for "Hot n Cold"
Chart (2008–2015)	Peak position
Australia (ARIA)	4
Austria (Ö3 Austria Top 40)	1
Belgium (Ultratop 50 Flanders)	2
Belgium (Ultratop 50 Wallonia)	1
Bulgaria (BAMP)	5
Canada Hot 100 (Billboard)	1
Canada AC (Billboard)	2
Canada CHR/Top 40 (Billboard)	1
Canada Hot AC (Billboard)	2
Chile (EFE)	1
CIS Airplay (TopHit)	1
Croatia International Airplay (HRT)	2
Czech Republic Airplay (ČNS IFPI)	1
Denmark (Tracklisten)	1
Europe (European Hot 100 Singles)	1
Finland (Suomen virallinen lista)	1
France (SNEP)	10
France Airplay (SNEP)	1
France Download (SNEP)	2
Germany (GfK)	1
Greece Digital Songs (Billboard)	1
Hungary (Rádiós Top 40)	1
Iceland (RÚV)	24
Ireland (IRMA)	3
Israel International Airplay (Media Forest)	2
Italy (FIMI)	2
Japan Hot 100 (Billboard)	34
Netherlands (Dutch Top 40)	1
Netherlands (Single Top 100)	5
Mexico Anglo (Monitor Latino)	1
New Zealand (Recorded Music NZ)	5
Norway (VG-lista)	1
Poland (Polish Airplay Charts)	1
Portugal Digital Song Sales (Billboard)	1
Romania (Romanian Top 100)	1
Russia Airplay (TopHit)	1
Slovakia Airplay (ČNS IFPI)	1
Spain (Promusicae)	13
Sweden (Sverigetopplistan)	2
Switzerland (Schweizer Hitparade)	1
Turkey International (Türkiye Top 20)	1
UK Singles (Official Charts)	4
Ukraine Airplay (TopHit)	1
US Billboard Hot 100	3
US Adult Contemporary (Billboard)	9
US Adult Pop Airplay (Billboard)	1
US Dance Club Songs (Billboard)	32
US Dance Singles Sales (Billboard)	1
US Pop Airplay (Billboard)	1
US Rhythmic Airplay (Billboard)	21
Venezuela Pop Rock (Record Report)	1

Chart (2026)	Peak position
Portugal (AFP)	179
Slovakia Singles Digital (ČNS IFPI)	38

=== Year-end charts ===
2008 year-end chart performance for "Hot n Cold"
Chart (2008)	Position
Australia (ARIA)	16
Austria (Ö3 Austria Top 40)	63
Canada (Canadian Hot 100)	31
CIS (TopHit)	103
Finland (Suomen virallinen lista)	13
Germany (Media Control GfK)	47
Netherlands (Dutch Top 40)	48
Netherlands (Single Top 100)	96
New Zealand (RIANZ)	25
Russia Airplay (TopHit)	135
Sweden (Sverigetopplistan)	40
Switzerland (Schweizer Hitparade)	40
UK Singles (OCC)	23
Ukraine Airplay (TopHit)	137
US Billboard Hot 100	36
US Mainstream Top 40 (Billboard)	39

2009 year-end chart performance for "Hot n Cold"
Chart (2009)	Position
Austria (Ö3 Austria Top 40)	5
Belgium (Ultratop 50 Flanders)	19
Belgium (Ultratop 50 Wallonia)	6
CIS (TopHit)	35
Canada (Canadian Hot 100)	11
Croatia International Airplay (HRT)	37
Europe (European Hot 100 Singles)	2
Finland (Suomen virallinen lista)	2
Germany (Media Control GfK)	13
Hungary (Rádiós Top 40)	1
Italy (FIMI)	14
Netherlands (Dutch Top 40)	46
Netherlands (Single Top 100)	68
Romania (Romanian Top 100)	1
Russia Airplay (TopHit)	36
Spain (PROMUSICAE)	35
Switzerland (Schweizer Hitparade)	4
UK Singles (OCC)	76
Ukraine Airplay (TopHit)	8
US Billboard Hot 100	25
US Adult Contemporary (Billboard)	17
US Adult Top 40 (Billboard)	12
US Mainstream Top 40 (Billboard)	35

2010 year-end chart performance for "Hot n Cold"
Chart (2010)	Position
Russia Airplay (TopHit)	194
Ukraine Airplay (TopHit)	152

2011 year-end chart performance for "Hot n Cold"
Chart (2011)	Position
Ukraine Airplay (TopHit)	128

2024 year-end chart performance for "Hot n Cold"
Chart (2024)	Position
Hungary (Rádiós Top 40)	96

=== Decade-end charts ===
Decade-end chart performance for "Hot n Cold"
Chart (2000–2009)	Position
Australia (ARIA)	30
CIS Airplay (TopHit)	67
Germany (Official German Charts)	19
Netherlands (Dutch Top 40)	52
Russia Airplay (TopHit)	89
UK Singles (OCC)	82
US Billboard Hot 100	69

== Certifications and sales ==
Certifications and sales for "Hot n Cold"
Region	Certification	Certified units/sales
Australia (ARIA)	10× Platinum	700,000^{‡}
Austria (IFPI Austria)	Platinum	30,000^{*}
Belgium (BRMA)	Gold	
Brazil (Pro-Música Brasil)	Diamond	250,000^{‡}
Brazil (Pro-Música Brasil) Rock-Version	Platinum	60,000^{*}
Canada (Music Canada)	Diamond	800,000^{‡}
Denmark (IFPI Danmark)	2× Platinum	30,000^{^}
Finland	4× Platinum	16,000
France (SNEP)	Diamond	333,333^{‡}
Germany (BVMI)	3× Gold	450,000^{‡}
Italy (FIMI)	Platinum	70,000^{‡}
New Zealand (RMNZ)	4× Platinum	120,000^{‡}
Norway (IFPI Norway)	3× Platinum	180,000^{‡}
South Korea	—	73,465 (Note: South Korea 2010 sales figures.)
Spain (Promusicae)	Platinum	60,000^{‡}
Switzerland (IFPI Switzerland)	Platinum	30,000^{^}
United Kingdom (BPI)	3× Platinum	1,800,000 (Note: United Kingdom sales figures as of June 2024.)
United States (RIAA)	8× Platinum	8,000,000^{‡}
Ringtone
Canada (Music Canada)	2× Platinum	80,000^{*}
Streaming
Greece (IFPI Greece)	Platinum	2,000,000^{†}
Summaries
Worldwide	—	11,790,000 (Note: Worldwide sales figures as of July 2021.)
^{*} Sales figures based on certification alone.^{^} Shipments figures based on certification alone.^{‡} Sales+streaming figures based on certification alone.^{†} Streaming-only figures based on certification alone.

== Release history ==
Release dates and formats for "Hot n Cold"
Region	Date	Format	Version	Label	Ref.
United States	September 9, 2008	Contemporary hit radio	Original	Capitol	
United States	September 29, 2008	Rhythmic contemporary radio	Original	Capitol	
United States	October 7, 2008	Hot adult contemporary radio	Original	Capitol	
Germany	November 21, 2008	CD	Original	Universal	
United Kingdom	November 24, 2008	CD	Original	Virgin	
Various	November 24, 2008	Digital EP	Remixes	Capitol	
France	December 14, 2008	CD	Original	EMI	

== Cover versions ==
=== Woe, Is Me version ===
"Hot 'n Cold"

Single by Woe, Is Me

from the album Punk Goes Pop Volume 03.
- Released: October 21, 2010
- Recorded: 2010
- Genre: Metalcore
- Length: 3:08
- Label: Rise, Velocity, distributed through Fearless
- Songwriters: Katy Perry; Lukasz Gottwald; Max Martin
- Producer: Cameron Mizell

Woe, Is Me singles chronology
"Hot 'n Cold" (2010)	"[&] Delinquents" (2011)

Atlanta-based metalcore band, Woe, Is Me covered the track for the compilation album Punk Goes Pop Volume 03., which was released on November 2, 2010. The song was leaked on October 6, 2010, and was officially released as a single for digital download on October 21, 2010. MTV News described the band's cover as "50 percent faithful to the original and..... 50 percent punishing, metal and gravel-throated growls. It must be heard to be believed." The band would later cover another Katy Perry song, "Last Friday Night (T.G.I.F)", on the fourth volume, their cover being released as a single too.

=== The Baseballs version ===
"Hot n Cold" was covered by the German rockabilly cover band The Baseballs in 2009 from their debut album, Strike!. Their cover charted in the band's home country of Germany, as well as in Finland and Switzerland.

==== Charts ====
Chart (2010)	Peak position
Germany (GfK)	68
Finland (Suomen virallinen lista)	7
Switzerland (Schweizer Hitparade)	52

=== Kid British cover ===
The song was covered by British ska and indie band Kid British. Their version was included on a 2009 Extended play (EP) titled iTunes Live: London Festival '09.

== See also ==
- List of Romanian Top 100 number ones of the 2000s
- List of highest-certified singles in Australia
