= Ivory Glaze =

Australian drag performer

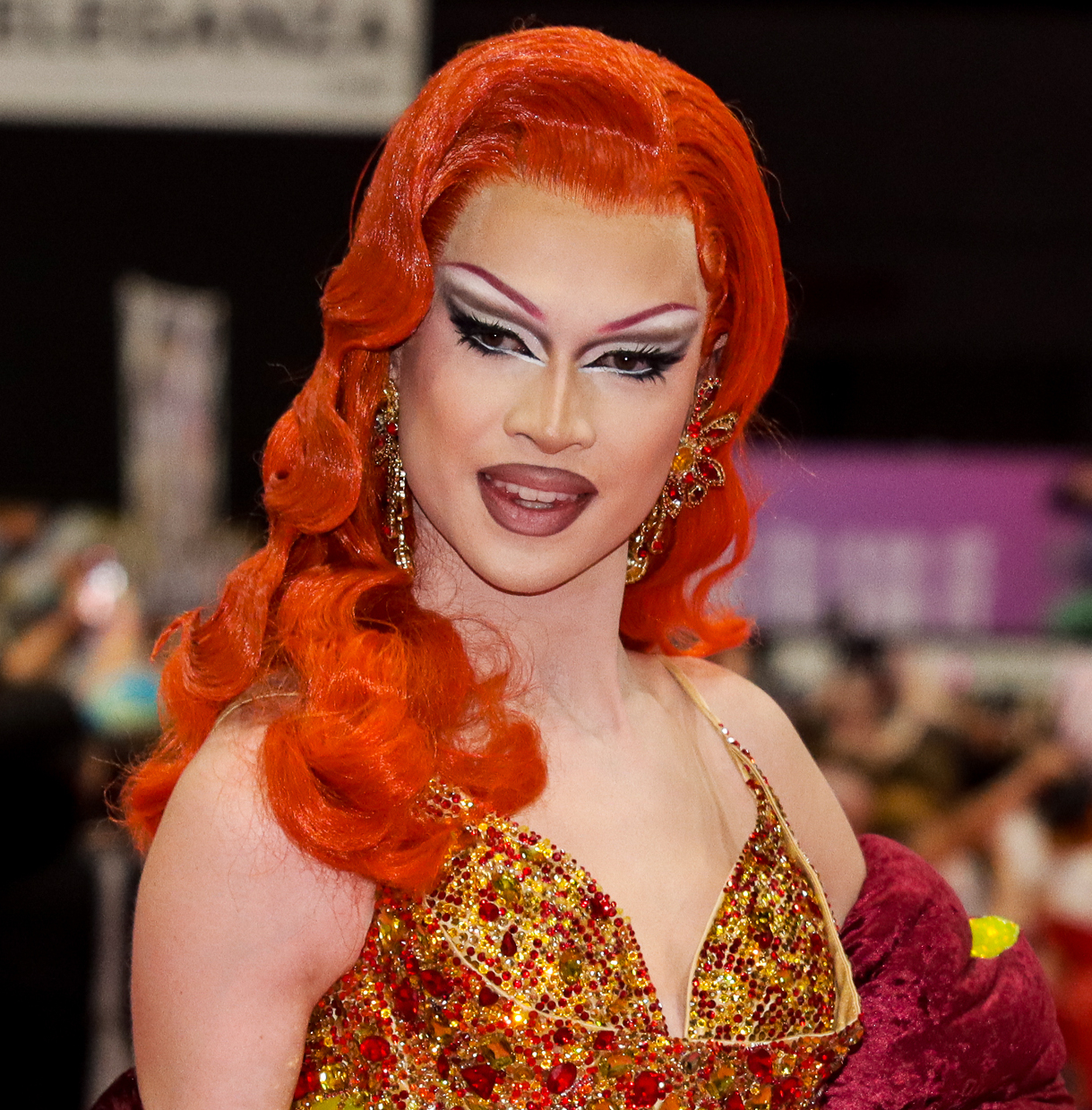
- Ivory Glaze at RuPaul's DragCon LA, 2024
- Born: 1996 or 1997 (age 28–29); Australia
- Occupation: Drag queen
- Television: RuPaul's Drag Race Down Under (season 3); Drag Race Philippines: Slaysian Royale (season 1)

Ivory Glaze is an Australian drag performer who competed on season 3 of RuPaul's Drag Race Down Under and season 1 of Drag Race Philippines: Slaysian Royale.

== Early life ==
Ivory Glaze was born in Australia to a Dutch father and a Chinese mother. Her mother was raised in Fiji.

== Career ==
Ivory Glaze's drag name originates from the name of the person who first put her in drag, Ivy, and ivory, a white material that is valuable in China. Ivory found the comparison humorous, as she is ethnically half-white and half-Chinese. She chose the surname "Glaze" because she didn't want to be known by a mononym and "pretended to know what [Glaze] meant". Her first public outing in drag was to The Imperial Erskineville in Sydney. A friend from Berowra, whom she had met on Grindr, put her in drag and accompanied her to the event.

Ivory Glaze competed on season 3 of RuPaul's Drag Race Down Under. She placed in the bottom two of the second episode, which featured a sewing challenge. Ivory Glaze fainted before the planned lip-sync, causing the contest to be postponed. She was eliminated at the start of the third episode, after losing a lip sync against Rita Menu to "Murder on the Dancefloor" (2001) by Sophie Ellis-Bextor. Rachel Shatto of Pride.com wrote, "While she only made it to episode three (and on a technicality at that) she managed to pull focus the entire time. Either with her stellar looks, her emotional story, and even a minor medical emergency. She has range, honey — plus all that charisma, uniqueness, nerve, and talent."

== Personal life ==
Ivory Glaze has described herself as "half-white and half-Chinese". She is based in Sydney, and uses she/her pronouns while in drag and he/him while out of drag. Prior to her appearance on Drag Race, she worked at a bank.

== Filmography ==
- RuPaul's Drag Race Down Under (season 3)
- Drag Race Philippines: Slaysian Royale

== See also ==
- List of people from Sydney
