= 2021 Antenna Awards =

Upcoming awards ceremony honouring excellence in community television production

- Date: September 18, 2021
- Location: Deakin Edge, Federation Square, Melbourne
- Country: Australia
- Hosted by: Lance DeBoyle; Gabriella Labucci
- Website: c31.org.au/antennas

Television/radio coverage
- Network: C31 Melbourne; 44 Adelaide

The 2021 Antenna Awards ceremony took place on 18 September 2021, instead of 29 May 2021 at the Deakin Edge at Federation Square in Melbourne. The ceremony was announced on 15 July 2019 and recognized excellence in Australian community television of the eligibility period, running from 1 July 2019 to 19 March 2021.

This was the 10th Antenna Awards ceremony and was broadcast live on C31 Melbourne and Channel 44 Adelaide. Nominations were accepted from producers of programs that aired on terrestrial community television – including the now-defunct WTV Perth – as well as satellite and cable channels Aurora and ICTV. Special consideration was also given to programs which aired before 30 June 2021.

== Winners and nominees ==
Outstanding Direction in a Program	Outstanding Editing in a Program
Transcending The Gender Narrative; Welcome To The Family; Rediscover Victoria; Recipe For Love; The Sri Lanka Morning Show; Ma Cherie	The Cellar Door: New Zealand; Just4Me Bake Club; The Black Box Experiment; Roaming The Outback; Sacred Spaces; Cash 4 Trash
Outstanding Sound in a Program	Outstanding Camera Work in a Program
Good Afternoon Adelaide; Recipe For Love; Atlantis Untold; The Cellar Door: New Zealand; Spacequake Sports (2019 Hockey SA Premier League Grand Final); Cash 4 Trash	Just4Me Bake Club; Last Drinks: Tasmania; Roaming The Outback; Recipe For Love; Rose St Pantry; The People’s Festival: 60 Years of Adelaide Fringe
Outstanding Technical & Creative Ingenuity in Lockdown	Outstanding Theme Song in a Program
Lance TV Ballarat; Move It Or Lose It Australia: At Home; Geelong Business Excellence Awards; The Rushed Behind; Bent TV; The Struggle	Damon Smith – The Beer Pioneer; Alexis Kotlowy – Good Afternoon Adelaide; Jacqui Lumsden – Rose St Pantry; Chris Newman – Talking Fishing; Anisha Thomas – Welcome To The Family; Adam Ritchie – Just4Me Bake Club
Best Non-Factual Program (Comedy/Narrative/Sketch/Art)	Best Music Program
The Leak Season 7; The Black Box Experiment; FLUNK; MyTV (RMITV); Good Afternoon Adelaide; Welcome to the Family	The Hard Rock Show; Melbourne Musos TV Show; 1700; MEMO TV; Gethsemane on TV; The Tribute Show
Best Factual, Current Affairs or Interview Program	Best Culturally and/or Linguistically Diverse Program
Russian Influence; Sri Lanka Morning Show; Transcending The Gender Narrative; Lance TV Ballarat; The Michael Kuzilny Show; Tough Times; Paula’s Place	National Ethnic and Multicultural Broadcasters’ Council Multicultural AFL Panel Show; Students Got Talent 2021; Victorian Multicultural Commission Awards for Excellence 2020; AMTV - Aussie Malaysian TV; Farda TV; Oz Indian TV
Best Special Interest or Lifestyle Program	Best Sports Program
Classic Restos; SA Wine Weekly; Dog Jobs Australia; Rose St Pantry; Wombat & Goose present “Outta The Can”; Last Drinks: Tasmania	Spacequake Sports; National Ethnic and Multicultural Broadcasters’ Council AFL Show; The Rushed Behind; Unanimous Sports Talk; The Local Footy Show; SA Sports Show
Best Seniors Program	Best Outdoor or Recreational Program
Good Evening Melbourne; Recipe For Love; Over 50 So What!; Country Cousins; Our Time; Move It Or Lose It	Off the Couch with Ethan; Roaming The Outback; Country Cousins; Get Hooked With Team Justagirl; Savage Seas Adventures; Reel Fun Lifestyle and Fishing
Best Live and/or Outside Broadcast	Best Journalism in a Program
Talking Fishing; Lance TV Ballarat; Geelong Business Excellence Awards; The Rushed Behind; Spacequake Sports; Bay To Birdwood	The Struggle; Offbeat (Season Eight); Tales of a City; Jethro Heller; Offbeat (Season 9 From Home); Kai’s Big Gold Ball by Kara Perrin; Good Evening Melbourne
Best Youth Personality	Best Youth Program
Nick Angus – Offbeat; Tavleen Singh – The Struggle; Isabella Taylor – Inspired By...; Sofia Vamvakidou – The Struggle; Ethan White – Off the Couch with Ethan; Patrick Scott – The Struggle	1700; Campus Cupid; The Struggle; Topics: Travel, Adventure & Mayhem; Inspired By; Off the Couch with Ethan
Best Personality in a Seniors Program	Outstanding Contribution to Community by a Program
Carol O’Halloran – Over 50 So What; Malcolm Harslett – OurTimeTV; Master Han Jin Song – Move It Or Lose It Australia; Caterina Borsato – Regional Italian Cuisine; Philip Newton – Farda TV; Ken Harris – Masterclass In Oils	Broadcast Radio Australia (SA); Victorian Multicultural Commission Awards for Excellence 2020; The Sri Lanka Morning Show; Australia Korean TV; Bent TV; Health, Wellbeing and Lifestyle
Outstanding Creative Achievement In A Program	Best Performance in a Non-Factual Program
The People’s Festival: 60 Years of Adelaide Fringe; Learning With Difficulties; Rediscover Victoria; The Black Box Experiment; The Cellar Door: New Zealand; Tales of a City – Jethro Heller	Kelsie Adelaide – FLUNK; Tim Wray – Good Afternoon Adelaide; Elisa Cristallo – Welcome To The Family; David M. Green – Good Afternoon Adelaide; Cherie Laurent – Ma Cherie; Gerard Kotlowy – Good Afternoon Adelaide
Personality of the Year	Program of the Year
Tavleen Singh – The Struggle; George Gayler – The Cellar Door: New Zealand; Lance DeBoyle – Lance TV Ballarat; Annie Louey – Rediscover Victoria; Caterina Borsato – Regional Italian Cuisine; Shankar Pillai – Come Up Starter Kit; Ethan White – Off the Couch with Ethan; Yazmin Firkins – Last Drinks: Tasmania; Maria Humphreys – Recipe For Love; David Kramer – Talking Fishing	Recipe For Love; FLUNK; The Cellar Door: New Zealand; Wombat & Goose present “Outta The Can”; Rediscover Victoria; Transcending The Gender Narrative; The Reel Thing; Just4Me Bake Club
The Stella Young Contribution to Community TV Award
Bent TV
