= Cellarr =

New Zealand indie pop group

- Origin: Auckland, New Zealand
- Genre: Indie pop
- Years active: 2012–present
- Label: Warner Music NZ (2015–2020)
- Members: PJ Shepherd; George Powell; Harry Carter
- Past members: Jen Newton; Possum Plows

Cellarr (formerly known as Maybe Rave and OpenSide) is an indie pop band from Auckland, New Zealand. It was formed under the name Maybe Rave by Jen Newton, PJ Shepherd, Harry Carter, and George Powell. Newton, the original vocalist, left in 2014 and was replaced by Possum Plows. Maybe Rave changed their name to OpenSide in 2015. In 2016, they released their debut EP, Push Back, which reached number 12 on the New Zealand Charts and number 2 on the New Zealand Music Charts. Following Plows's departure in 2020, the band changed their name again, to Cellarr, and they have since issued two EPs.

== History ==
=== 2012–2014: Maybe Rave ===
Jen Newton (vocals), PJ Shepherd (guitar, vocals), Harry Carter (bass), and George Powell (drums) formed Maybe Rave in 2013 in Auckland, New Zealand. They initially uploaded covers of songs by other artists, such as "Royals" by Lorde, to YouTube, before posting a few original tracks on their Bandcamp page, including "Here Me Now" and "First Time", as well as the EP At Peace in Pieces. In 2014, Newton left the band and was replaced by Possum Plows. They toured Australia, and in March 2015, they announced that they had changed their name to OpenSide, inspired by the sport Quidditch from the Harry Potter series, where one of the positions is Openside Chaser.

=== 2015–2020: OpenSide ===
In March 2016, OpenSide signed with Warner Music NZ, and later that year, they released their debut EP, Push Back, which peaked at no. 2 on the New Zealand Music Albums chart and no. 12 on the New Zealand Album chart. The single "Letting it Out" reached no. 2 on the New Zealand Heatseeker Chart. In September 2016, they were chosen to open for Ellie Goulding, All Time Low, Ladyhawke, Fall Out Boy, Twenty One Pilots, and Panic! at the Disco. In August 2017, the band issued the single "I Feel Nothing". In April 2018, they followed it with "No Going Back", which peaked at no. 1 on the New Zealand Hot Singles Chart. They subsequently toured New Zealand.

In early October 2018, OpenSide released the single "Character Flaws", which peaked at no. 2 on the New Zealand Music Hot Singles Chart and no. 23 on the New Zealand Hot Singles Chart. The band later announced that they would be releasing a comic book at the 2018 Auckland Armageddon. The single was followed by the EP Episode One: Character Flaws. In December, the band performed at the Rhythm & Vines music festival.

In February 2019, OpenSide performed at Big Gay Out. In March, they released the single "Waiting for Love", from the EP Episode Two: Waiting for Love, which followed in May.

On 16 January 2020, OpenSide announced their breakup via Facebook.

=== 2021–2023: Cellarr ===
In May 2021, the former members of OpenSide, not including Plows, reunited under the name Cellarr and released the single "LUV". In September 2022, they issued their first EP, Better (feat. Rhys Rich). In February 2023, they released their second EP, Golden Minds Resort. In September, they published the single "Everybody Else", which reached no. 6 on the Hot 20 Aotearoa Singles chart.

== Band members ==
=== Current ===
- PJ Shepherd – guitar, vocals (2012–present)
- George Powell – drums (2012–present)
- Harry Carter – bass (2012–present)

=== Past ===
- Jen Newton – vocals (2012–2014)
- Possum Plows – vocals (2014–2020)

== Discography ==
=== As Maybe Rave ===
- "Here Me Now" (single, 2013)
- "First Time" (single, 2013)
- At Peace in Pieces (EP, 2013)

=== As OpenSide ===
==== EPs ====
Title	Year	Peak chart positions		Certifications
Title	Year	NZ	NZ Music	Certifications
Push Back	2016	12	2	
Episode One: Character Flaws	2018	—	—	—
Episode Two: Waiting for Love	2019	—	—	—
"—" denotes items that were not released in that country or failed to chart.

==== Singles ====
Title	Year	Peak chart positions				Certifications	Album
Title	Year	NZ	NZ Hot	NZ Music	NZ Music Hot	Certifications	Album
"Worth It"	2015	—	—	—	—		Non-album single
"Lean On"	2015	—	—	—	—		Non-album single
"Letting It Out"	2016	—	—	—	2		Push Back
"I Feel Nothing"	2017	—	—	11	—		Non-album single
"No Going Back"	2018	—	—	—	1		Non-album single
"Character Flaws"	2018	—	23	—	2		Episode One: Character Flaws
"Waiting for Love"	2019	—	—	11	1		Episode Two: Waiting for Love
"I Just Wanted You"	2019	—	—	—	—		Episode Two: Waiting for Love
"Kiss Me"	2019	—	—	—	10		Episode Two: Waiting for Love
"FCK U"	2019	—	—	—	20		Non-album single
"—" denotes items that were not released in that country or failed to chart.

==== Other charted songs ====
Title	Year	Peak chart positions	Album
Title	Year	NZ Music Hot	Album
"Work Out"	2018	8	Episode One: Character Flaws
"Tuesday"	2018	19	Episode One: Character Flaws
"—" denotes items that were not released in that country or failed to chart.

==== Music videos ====
Title	Year	Director(s)	Location
"Worth it"	2015	Tim van Dammen	New Zealand
"Branches"	2016	Mikey Rockwell	Auckland, New Zealand
"Letting It Out"	2016	Paul Innes	
"I Feel Nothing"	2017	Shae Sterling	California, USA
"No Going Back"	2018	Shae Sterling	Auckland, New Zealand
"Character Flaws"	2018	Shae Sterling	Guangzhou, China
"Waiting for Love"	2019	Shae Sterling	Auckland, New Zealand
"Kiss Me"	2019		Auckland, New Zealand
"FCK U"	2019	Carolina Cortella	Los Angeles, California, USA

=== As Cellarr ===
==== EPs ====
Title	Year	Peak chart positions		Certifications
Title	Year	NZ	NZ Music	Certifications
Better (feat. Rhys Rich)	2022	—	—	—
Golden Minds Resort	2023	—	—	—
"—" denotes items that were not released in that country or failed to chart.

==== Singles ====
Title	Year	Peak chart positions				Certifications	Album
Title	Year	NZ	NZ Hot	NZ Music	NZ Music Hot	Certifications	Album
"LUV"	2021	—	—	—	—		Non-album single
"Serotonin feat. LA WOMEN"	2021	—	35	—	7		Non-album single
"Reopen"	2021	—	—	—	2		Non-album single
"Let Go feat. Lilly Carron"	2022	—	—	—	17		Golden Minds Resort
"Transpire"	2022	—	—	—	—		Golden Minds Resort
"Gold feat Lora"	2022	—	20	—	6		Golden Minds Resort
"Everybody Else"	2023	—	—	—	6		Golden Minds Resort
"—" denotes items that were not released in that country or failed to chart.

==== Music videos ====
Title	Year
"Serotonin "	2021
"Let Go"	2022
"Transpire"	2022
"Gold"	2022
"Freak Out"	2023

== Bibliography ==
Comics

- OpenSide Episode One: Character Flaws (art by Inzunza, written by William Geradts & Possum Plows, Ink by Danny Jiménez, Lettering by Christian Docolomansky, Warner Music New Zealand, 2018)
