= My Life Is Murder =

Australian/New Zealand television series

- Genre: Crime; Comedy-Drama; Mystery
- Directed by: Leah Purcell; Mat King; Jo O'Shaughnessy; Ben C. Lucas; Britta Hawkins; Kiel McNaughton; Katie Wolfe; Mike Smith; Michael Hurst
- Starring: Lucy Lawless; Bernard Curry; Ebony Vagulans; Rawiri Jobe; Alex Andreas; Joe Naufahu
- Narrated by: Lucy Lawless
- Theme music composer: Christian Scallan
- Composers: Burkhard Dallwitz; Brett Aplin; Mana Music
- Countries of origin: Australia (season 1); New Zealand (season 2-present)
- Original language: English
- No. of seasons: 5
- No. of episodes: 46 (list of episodes)

Production
- Executive producers: Nick Murray; Claire Tonkin; Lucy Lawless; Tim Pye; Rachel Antony; Nicky Davis Williams; Pilar Perez; Don Klees
- Producers: Claire Tonkin; Elisa Argenzio; Mark Beesley
- Production locations: Melbourne, Australia (season 1); Auckland, New Zealand (season 2-present)
- Editor: Denise Haratzis
- Camera setup: Multi-camera
- Running time: 44 minutes
- Production companies: CJZ (season 1); Greenstone TV (season 2-present)

Original release
- Network: Network 10
- Release: 17 July – 18 September 2019
- Network: TVNZ 1
- Release: 9 August 2021 – present

My Life Is Murder is an Australian–New Zealand murder mystery crime comedy-drama television series, broadcast on Network 10 and TVNZ 1. The ten part series premiered on 17 July 2019, at 8:40 pm. In the United States, the series began streaming on Acorn TV on 5 August 2019 and in the United Kingdom, on Alibi on 24 September 2019.

By the end of October 2020, the series had been renewed for a second 10-episode season, with TVNZ, Network 10, Acorn and other networks signed on to broadcast. The second season premiered August 9, 2021 on TVNZ 1, and began streaming in North America on Acorn on August 30, 2021. In February 2022, the series was renewed for a third 10-episode season by Acorn which was broadcast later that year.

In December 2023, AMC Networks announced via a press release that there would be an eight-episode fourth season.

In February 2025, an eight-episode fifth season was announced by AMC Networks.

== Synopsis ==
My Life Is Murder follows the adventures of fearless former detective, now PI, Alexa Crowe who assists DI Kieran Hussey (Season 1) and Detective Harry Henare (Season 2—) in solving a variety of complex homicides with the help of tech-savvy assistant Madison, convicted felon brother Will, and café owner and friend Reuben Wulf.

== Cast ==
=== Main ===
- Lucy Lawless as PI Alexa Crowe, former detective of the Victoria Police Criminal Investigation Branch (CIB). As a side hustle, she bakes bread in her kitchen for Brewster Café. From the second season, she moves to Auckland to be closer to her brother, Will. She also starts bread deliveries to Reuben's Cafe.
- Ebony Vagulans as Madison Feliciano, Alexa's assistant. She's a former hacker and enrolled into the scientific police to avoid being arrested.
- Bernard Curry as DI Kieran Hussey (Season 1; guest Season 2), detective for the CIB for whom Crowe consults.
- Rawiri Jobe as Detective Harry Henare (Season 2—), a friend of Kieran who gives cases to Crowe.
- Alex Andreas as George Stathopoulos (Season 1), owner of the Brewster Café.
- Joe Naufahu as Reuben Wulf (Season 2—), owner of the Reuben's Cafe.

=== Recurring ===
- Dilruk Jayasinha as Dr. Suresh (Season 1)
- Kate McCartney as Dawn Mason (Season 1), Alexa's landlady and neighbour
- Martin Henderson as Will Crowe (Seasons 2—), Alexa's brother
- Todd River as Captain Thunderbolt, Alexa's pet cat (Season 1)
- Zeppelin as Chowder, Alexa's pet cat (Seasons 2—)
- Tatum Warren-Ngata as Beth, a Navy Cryptologist and Madison's gamer friend (Season 3); also briefly as Sam Turei (victim in Season 2 Episode Crushed Dreams)
- Steffen Schweizer as Gerhardt (Season 1)
- Laura Daniel as Isla (Season 2)
- Nell Fisher as Olive Crowe (Season 3). Alexa's niece and Will's daughter

=== Notable guests ===
- Alicia Gardiner as Joanne Argus
- Alin Sumarwata as Morgana Finch
- Andrew McFarlane as Graydon
- Bill Bailey as Enzo Pavone
- Bruce Hopkins as Tony Danovich
- Danielle Cormack as Nikki Malone
- Diana Glenn as Imogen Cavanagh
- Don Hany as Roger Sims
- Elektra Shock as Ginger Snaps, a drag queen
- Jane Harber as Chloe Angel, a Clairvoyant
- Kita Mean as Needa, a drag queen
- Lindsay Farris as Dylan Giroux, an escort (first appears in the first episode of the first season)
- Lisa Hensley as Chef Brenda Levine
- Madeleine Sami as Lena
- Magda Szubanski as Miranda Lee
- Mavournee Hazel as Zoe Swan
- Nadine Garner as Katrina Logan
- Paul Denny as Dan
- Renee O'Connor as Clarissa Klein
- Rhys Darby as Byron
- Richard Davies as Tye Danziger
- Roy Billing as Murray
- Ryan Corr as Samuel Morgan
- Simone Kessell as Faith Cooper
- Temuera Morrison as Frankie Jones, a singer
- William Shatner as Barton Wallwork

== Episodes ==
=== Series overview ===
Season	Episodes	Originally aired		Broadcaster
Season	Episodes	First aired	Last aired	Broadcaster
1	10	17 July 2019	18 September 2019	Network 10
2	10	9 August 2021	18 October 2021	TVNZ 1
3	10	29 August 2022	31 October 2022	TVNZ 1
4	8	21 April 2024	9 June 2024	TVNZ 1
5	8	3 August 2025	21 September 2025	TVNZ 1

=== Season 1 (2019) ===
No. overall	No. in season	Title	Directed by	Written by	Original release date	Prod. code	Australian viewers
1	1	"The Boyfriend Experience"	Leah Purcell	Matt Ford	July 17, 2019	349963-1	546,000
2	2	"The Locked Room"	Mat King	Peter Gawler	July 24, 2019	349963-2	440,000
3	3	"Lividity in Lycra"	Leah Purcell	Ainslie Clouston	31 July 2019	349963-3	494,000
4	4	"Can't Stand the Heat"	Mat King	Chris Hawkshaw	7 August 2019	349963-4	515,000
5	5	"Feet of Clay"	Jovita O'Shaughnessy	Claire Tonkin	14 August 2019	349963-5	479,000
6	6	"Another Bloody Podcast"	Jovita O'Shaughnessy	Monica Zanetti & Tim Pye	21 August 2019	349963-6	382,000
7	7	"Old School"	Ben C Lucas	Chris Hawkshaw	28 August 2019	349963-7	406,000
8	8	"Remains to Be Seen"	Ben C Lucas	Tim Pye	4 September 2019	349963-8	343,000
9	9	"Fake Empire"	Mat King	Paul Bennett	11 September 2019	349963-9	242,000
10	10	"Mirror Mirror"	Mat King	Chris Corbett & Tim Pye	18 September 2019	349963-10	413,000

=== Season 2 (2021) ===
No. overall	No. in season	Title	Directed by	Written by	Original release date	Prod. code
11	1	"Call of the Wild"	Britta Hawkins	Tim Pye	9 August 2021	349963-11
Relocating back to her hometown of Auckland, Alexa is called upon by Detective Harry Henare to investigate the case of Tamara Innes (Robyn Malcolm), a fabric shop owner accused of a "stranger" murder. One morning, Tamara appears to have awoken and shot local entrepreneur Michael Suzmann for no apparent reason whilst he was out running. Harry suspects the case isn't as open-and-shut as it seems, and Alexa appears faced with an impossible puzzle to solve.
12	2	"Oceans Apart"	Britta Hawkins	Jodie Molloy	16 August 2021	349963-12
13	3	"All That Glitters"	Mike Smith	Kathryn Burnett	23 August 2021	349963-13
14	4	"Look Don't Touch"	Mike Smith	Chris Hawkshaw	30 August 2021	349963-14
15	5	"Crushed Dreams"	Kiel McNaughton	Shoshana McCallum	6 September 2021	349963-15
16	6	"Sleep No More"	Kiel McNaughton	Kate McDermott	20 September 2021	349963-16
17	7	"All the Better to See You"	Katie Wolfe	Malinna Liang	27 September 2021	349963-17
18	8	"Hidden Gems"	Katie Wolfe	Claire Tonkin	4 October 2021	349963-18
19	9	"Wild Life"	Michael Hurst	Malinna Liang	11 October 2021	349963-19
20	10	"Pleasure & Pain"	Michael Hurst	Jodie Molloy	18 October 2021	349963-20

=== Season 3 (2022) ===
No. overall	No. in season	Title	Directed by	Written by	Original release date	Prod. code
21	1	"It Takes Two"	Michael Hurst	Malinna Liang	29 August 2022	349963-21
22	2	"Nothing Concrete"	Caroline Bell-Booth	Kathryn Burnett and Kate McDermott	5 September 2022	349963-23
23	3	"Bloodlines"	Caroline Bell-Booth	Stacy Gregg	12 September 2022	349963-24
24	4	"The Village"	Michael Hurst	Shoshana McCallum and Kate McDermott	26 September 2022	349963-22
25	5	"Silent Lights"	David de Lautour	Kate McDermott	3 October 2022	349963-25
26	6	"Bride to Bee"	David de Lautour	Jodie Molloy and Paul Jenner	10 October 2022	349963-26
27	7	"Breaking Bread"	Kiel McNaughton	Chris Hawkshaw	17 October 2022	349963-27
28	8	"Gaslight Sonata"	Kiel McNaughton	Stephen Campbell and Chris Hawkshaw	24 October 2022	349963-28
29	9	"Staying Mum"	Mike Smith	Kate McDermott	31 October 2022	349963-29
30	10	"Rising Angel"	Mike Smith	Jodie Molloy and Stacy Gregg	31 October 2022	349963-30

=== Season 4 (2024) ===
No. overall	No. in season	Title	Directed by	Written by	Original release date	Prod. code
31	1	"To Dye For"	Michael Hurst	Kim Harrop	21 April 2024	349963-31
32	2	"Tough Love"	Michael Hurst	Stacy Gregg	28 April 2024	349963-32
33	3	"Location, Location, Location"	Kiel McNaughton	Kate McDermott	5 May 2024	349963-33
34	4	"One Man's Poison"	Kiel McNaughton	Kathryn Burnett & Kate McDermott	12 May 2024	349963-34
35	5	"En Pointe"	Sima Urale	Maxine Fleming	19 May 2024	349963-35
36	6	"The Good Oil"	Sima Urale	Marina Alofagia McCartney	26 May 2024	349963-36
37	7	"The Widows' Club Part 1"	Katie Wolfe	Stacy Gregg	2 June 2024	349963-37
38	8	"The Widows' Club Part 2"	Katie Wolfe	Kate McDermott	9 June 2024	349963-38

=== Season 5 (2025) ===
No. overall	No. in season	Title	Directed by	Written by	Original release date	Prod. code
39	1	"Gimme an M"	Josh Frizzell	Kim Harrop	3 August 2025	349963-39
40	2	"Catfish"	Jacquie Nairn	Kate McDermott	10 August 2025	349963-41
41	3	"For the Love of Dog"	Josh Frizzell	Amanda Alison	17 August 2025	349963-40
42	4	"Top Two Inches"	Jacquie Nairn	James Griffin and Paul Jenner	24 August 2025	349963-42
43	5	"Thirteen O'Clock"	Simon Bennett	Stacy Gregg and Kate McDermott	31 August 2025	349963-43
44	6	"Bad Chemistry"	Simon Bennett	Marina Alofagia McCartney	7 September 2025	349963-44
45	7	"The One That Got Away Part 1"	Michael Hurst	Kate McDermott	14 September 2025	349963-45
46	8	"The One That Got Away Part 2"	Michael Hurst	Kate McDermott	21 September 2025	349963-46

== Home media ==
DVD Releases
Season	Region 1/A	Region 2	Region 4
1	28 January 2020	16 August 2021	9 March 2022 (Re-release)
2	12 July 2021	TBA	1 December 2021
