= Hugo Grrrl =

New Zealand drag king, comedian and cabaret producer

- Born: George Fowler; 1 April 1991 (age 35); Christchurch, New Zealand
- Occupations: Drag king, comedian, cabaret producer
- Known for: House of Drag winner
- Website: www.hugogrrrl.com

George Fowler (born 1 April 1991) better known by the stage name Hugo Grrrl, is a New Zealand drag king, comedian, and cabaret producer, best known for winning the inaugural season of House of Drag. Upon entering the competition, Hugo Grrrl became the first drag king and first trans man to compete on a drag reality show.

== Drag king career ==
After finishing his studies, Fowler worked nights in bars before having a gender identity crisis in his twenties and deciding to dress in drag. He quit his job and started his career as a full-time drag king. In 2016, Hugo Grrrl created his well known shows "Naked Girls Reading", consisting of nude women reciting literature aloud, and "The Pun Battle" which is generally a battle between two comedians with a play on words. With the success and popularity of both shows, Hugo Grrrl decided to take the shows on tour across the country.

== House of Drag ==
In 2018, Hugo Grrrl entered a New Zealand reality competition television series produced by Warner Bros. International TV Production New Zealand for TVNZ OnDemand and OutTV. It debuted on 15 November 2018 on TVNZ OnDemand. In the first episode, all the contestants were introduced and participated in a photoshoot challenge. Hugo entered in a Ringmaster type outfit and had a stunning photoshoot making him safe for that week. In the second episode, the contestants participated in a comedy stand up challenge with Hugo Grrrl wearing a Pink suit. His stand up routine was about coming out as a trans man. In the third episode Hugo began the episode wearing a boy scouts outfit. After a comedic skit of tai chi, the contestants spoke about the criticism that Hugo Grrrl and Trinity Ice received for being transgender and a drag queen. Hugo Grrrl won the challenge of the week, which was a DIY outfit challenge.

In the fourth episode, it began with Hugo Grrrl reflecting his win from the previous week. In this episodes challenge the contestants did an acting challenge. Surprisingly team captain Lola Blades picked Hugo to be in his team. Their team skit was the beginning of the host Anita Wigl'it career. Hugo's team won the team challenge, making him safe for the week. In the fifth episode, the contestants had to compete in a dance challenge. Lola Blades was randomly selected to hand out the themes of the challenges, which resulted in Lola selecting Hugo to do the Hip Hop theme. Hugo performed his dance routine successfully, receiving only positive comments. Hugo Grrrl was safe on this week's episode. On the sixth episode, It began with Hugo talking a little on his rival Lola Blades with Bunny Holiday. In this episodes challenge, the contestants had a four-person tournament like a rap battle. Hugo defeated Leidy Lei in the Semifinals, however, lost against Lola Blades in the finals. Hugo Grrrl was safe in this week's episode. In the season finale, the competition were down to its final three. In the final challenge, the contestants had to compete in a lipsync challenge to "Cherry Blossom" by Sal Valentine. After a successful lip sync, Hugo Grrrl won the Inaugural season of House of drag with Lola Blades coming second and Leidy Lei coming third. Hugo took home a prize of $10,000, a 55" LG Smart LED TV and one year of free Broadband.

== Mr. Hugo’s Little Library ==
In 2026, a children’s television series, Mr. Hugo’s Little Library has been released. At the beginning of each episode, Mr. Hugo wakes up in his bed in the morning, then the theme song begins. The show ends with Mr. Hugo sleeping in his bed at night.

== Personal life ==
George Fowler was born in Christchurch to two English teachers. He moved to Wellington at the age of 17.

== Filmography ==
Year	Title	Role	Note
2018	TVNZ Breakfast	Himself	
2018	Seven Sharp	Himself	
2018	House of Drag	Himself	7 Episodes, Winner

== Events and tours ==
- The Pun Battle
- Naked Girls Reading

== Awards ==
- 2017 Wellington Comedy Awards Best Producer (Won)
- 2018 Wellington Comedy Awards Best Producer (Won)
- 2018 Wellington Comedy Awards Best MC (Won)
- 2018 Wellington Comedy Awards Outstanding Achievement (Won)
- 2018 Wellingtonian of the Year Arts Category (Nominated)

== See also ==
- List of drag kings
