= Mana Music =

Music supervision company

Mana Music was a music services company based in Australia and New Zealand. It grew steadily in the early 2000s, offering services to advertisers using popular songs in their commercials.

In 2010, it merged with Soundtrax to form Franklin Rd. As of 2011, its joint managing director was Jonathan Hughes.

== Screen composers ==
David Bridie, Dale Cornelius, Peter Dasent, Elizabeth Drake, Joel Haines, Mick Harvey, Philip Judd, Johnny Klimek & Reinhold Heil, David Long, Don McGlashan, Plan 9, Richard Pleasance and David Thrussell.

== Music supervision ==
=== Films ===
- Perfect Strangers
- Whale Rider
- Muriel's Wedding
- Rikky and Pete
- No. 2
- Death in Brunswick
- Love the Beast
- The Tree
- My Year Without Sex
- Mary and Max
- Boys are Back
- Boy
- Griff the Invisible

=== TV ===
- Good Guys Bad Guys
- Street Legal
- Outrageous Fortune
- City Homicide
- Talkin' 'Bout Your Generation
- Satisfaction
- Four Weddings
- Bondi Rescue
- Recruits
- My Life Is Murder
