= Lance TV Ballarat =

- Also known as: LaNCE TV
- Genre: Variety Chat Show
- Starring: Lance DeBoyle and Gabriella Labucci

Production
- Executive producer: Deb Lord
- Production locations: Ballarat, Victoria
- Running time: 1 hour
- Production company: LanceTV Inc.

Original release
- Network: C31 Melbourne

LaNCE TV is a one-hour-long live variety show produced by LanceTV Inc., and is hosted by Lance DeBoyle and Gabriella Labucci. The show commenced streaming to Facebook in July 2017, from the regional city of Ballarat in Western Victoria. In February 2020 LaNCE TV also began airing on community television station C31 Melbourne.

In June 2020, LaNCE TV was central to an ABC news story about the extension of a broadcasting license for C31 Melbourne. The show later received a letter from the Chairperson and General Manager of C31, thanking LaNCE TV for their advocacy efforts.

On 8 November 2020, a LaNCE TV press release was published by The Courier, to promote a special extended episode in honour of Transgender Day of Remembrance. The article was posted on the newspaper's social media page, sparking controversy when the article thread received online hatred and abuse. LaNCE TV issued a second press release and The Courier published a follow-up article on 20 November, denouncing hatred and abuse aimed at the Ballarat Trans and Gender Diverse community.

In April 2021, LaNCE TV was nominated under four categories for the Australian community television awards-The Antenna Awards: Best Factual, Current Affairs or Interview Program; Best Live and/or Outside Broadcast Program; Outstanding Technical & Creative Ingenuity During Lockdown and Personality of the Year (DeBoyle) The shows hosts DeBoyle and Labucci were also given the honour of hosting the awards.

On 18 September, in a pre-recorded acceptance speech from the Ballaarat Mechanics Institute, LaNCE TV hosts Lance DeBoyle and Gabriella Labucci accepted the award for Outstanding Technical Ingenuity during Lockdown during the 2021 Antenna Awards. News of the win was featured on the national pop culture and entertainment website Scenestr.
