= Elektra Shock =

New Zealand drag queen

- Born: James Luck; 30 September 1992 (age 32); England, United Kingdom
- Occupation: Drag queen
- Known for: House of Drag; RuPaul's Drag Race Down Under

James Luck (born 30 September 1992), better known by the stage name Elektra Shock, is a New Zealand drag performer best known for competing on the first season of RuPaul's Drag Race Down Under and the second season of House of Drag.

== Early life ==
Luck was born in England and raised in Invercargill, New Zealand where he attended Southland Boys' High School. He studied dance at the Urban Dance Centre in Sydney, Australia.

== Career ==
Luck has worked as a backup dancer for acts such as Sia, Jesse James, and Little Mix. He was a backup dancer in the 2012 Summer Olympics Closing Ceremony for Annie Lennox.

In 2018, Luck was a guest dancer on Dancing with the Stars and was on the judging panel of Indian-inspired dance competition The Great NZ Dance Masala.

Elektra was a contestant on the second season of the New Zealand drag competition show House of Drag, placing as the runner-up. On the show, she won four challenges, the most in the show's history, and never placed in the bottom. She was eliminated in the final lip sync by that season's winner, New Zealand drag queen Spankie Jackzon.

In March 2021, Elektra was announced as a competitor on the first season of RuPaul's Drag Race Down Under. House of Drag hosts and judges Kita Mean and Anita Wigl'it competed alongside Elektra, making Elektra the first Drag Race contestant to compete against the judges of a previous show she was on.

Elektra became known as a "lip sync assassin" on her season, eliminating JoJo Zaho and Coco Jumbo in episodes 1 and 3. She won the commercial challenge in episode 5. In episode 7, she landed in the bottom two and was eliminated by season winner Kita Mean.

The name "Elektra Shock" is derived from electric shock; the name was given to her by her drag mother Trinity Ice.

Luck appeared as a judge on the ninth series of Dancing with the Stars.

== Personal life ==
Luck has identified as queer. He lives in the Ponsonby neighborhood of Auckland with his partner Michael.

== Filmography ==
=== Television ===
Year	Title	Role	Notes
2018	Dancing with the Stars	Himself	Guest dancer (series 7)
2018	The Great NZ Dance Masala	Himself	Judge
2020	House of Drag	Herself	Runner-up (season 2)
2021	RuPaul's Drag Race Down Under (season 1)	Herself	5th place (season 1)
2021	My Life is Murder	Ginger Snaps	Season 2 Episode 3
2022	Dancing with the Stars	Himself	Judge (series 9)
2022	RuPaul's Drag Race Down Under (season 2)	Herself	Guest Choreographer
