= Bumpa Love =

Drag performer

- Born: Richard Taki
- Occupation: Drag queen
- Television: RuPaul's Drag Race Down Under (season 3)
- Website: bumpalove.com

Bumpa Love is the stage name of Richard Taki, a drag performer who competed on the third season of RuPaul's Drag Race Down Under.

== Early life ==
Bumpa Love is of Māori descent.

== Career ==
Bumpa Love runs the venue Vau d'vile Drag Cabaret, and has been part of the drag scene for 25 years. She competed on the third season of RuPaul's Drag Race Down Under. Bumpa Love impersonated Kiri Te Kanawa for the Snatch Game challenge.

== Personal life ==
Bumpa Love is based in Melbourne, uses the pronouns she/her in drag and he/him out of drag.

== See also ==
- List of people from Melbourne
