= Ashley Madison (drag queen) =

Australian drag performer

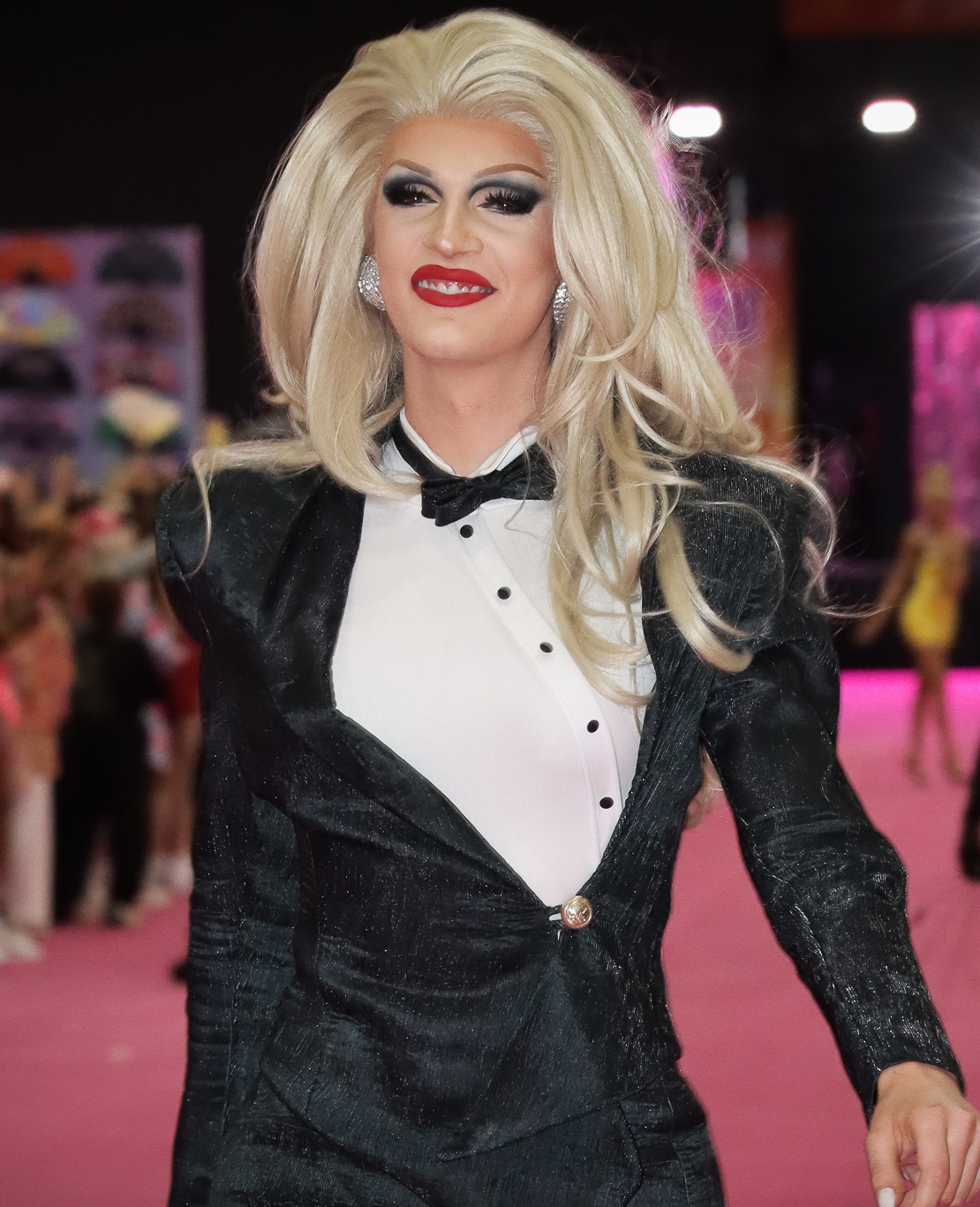
- Ashley Madison at RuPaul's DragCon LA, 2024
- Born: Sean Glasson
- Occupation: Drag queen
- Television: RuPaul's Drag Race Down Under (season 3)
- Website: ashleyxmadison.com

Ashley Madison is the stage name of Sean Glasson, an Australian drag performer who competed on Season 3 of RuPaul's Drag Race Down Under.

== Early life and education ==
Glasson was raised in Mooroopna and attended Mooroopna Secondary College. They relocated to Melbourne at age 18.

== Career ==
Glasson is a drag performer who competed as Ashley Madison on Season 3 of RuPaul's Drag Race Down Under. They impersonated Jesus for the Snatch Game challenge. Ashley Madison is also a disc jockey and owns a jewelry business. They were first runner-up at the Miss Gay Australia Pageant and was named 'Belle of the Ball' at the Drag Industry Variety Awards.

== Personal life ==
Glasson is based in Melbourne, and uses the pronouns she/they in drag and the pronouns she/he/they out of drag.

== See also ==
- List of people from Melbourne
