= Hollywould Star =

American-born Australian performer

- Born: Timothy Springs; United States
- Television: RuPaul's Drag Race Down Under (season 3)
- Website: hollywouldstar.com

Hollywould Star is the stage name of Timothy Springs, an American-born Australian drag performer who competed on the third season of RuPaul's Drag Race Down Under.

== Early life ==
Hollywould Star was born in the United States.

== Career ==
Hollywould Star is a drag performer who competed on the third season of RuPaul's Drag Race Down Under. She began doing drag while playing Lola in a production of Kinky Boots. Hollywould Star has performed at Sydney World Pride and the 2022 Sydney Gay and Lesbian Mardi Gras parade.

== Personal life ==
Hollywould Star identifies as queer, and uses the pronouns she/her in drag and he/him out of drag. She is based in Sydney, and previously lived in New York City. Her drag is inspired by Naomi Campbell.
