= Luke Bird =

New Zealand singer and presenter

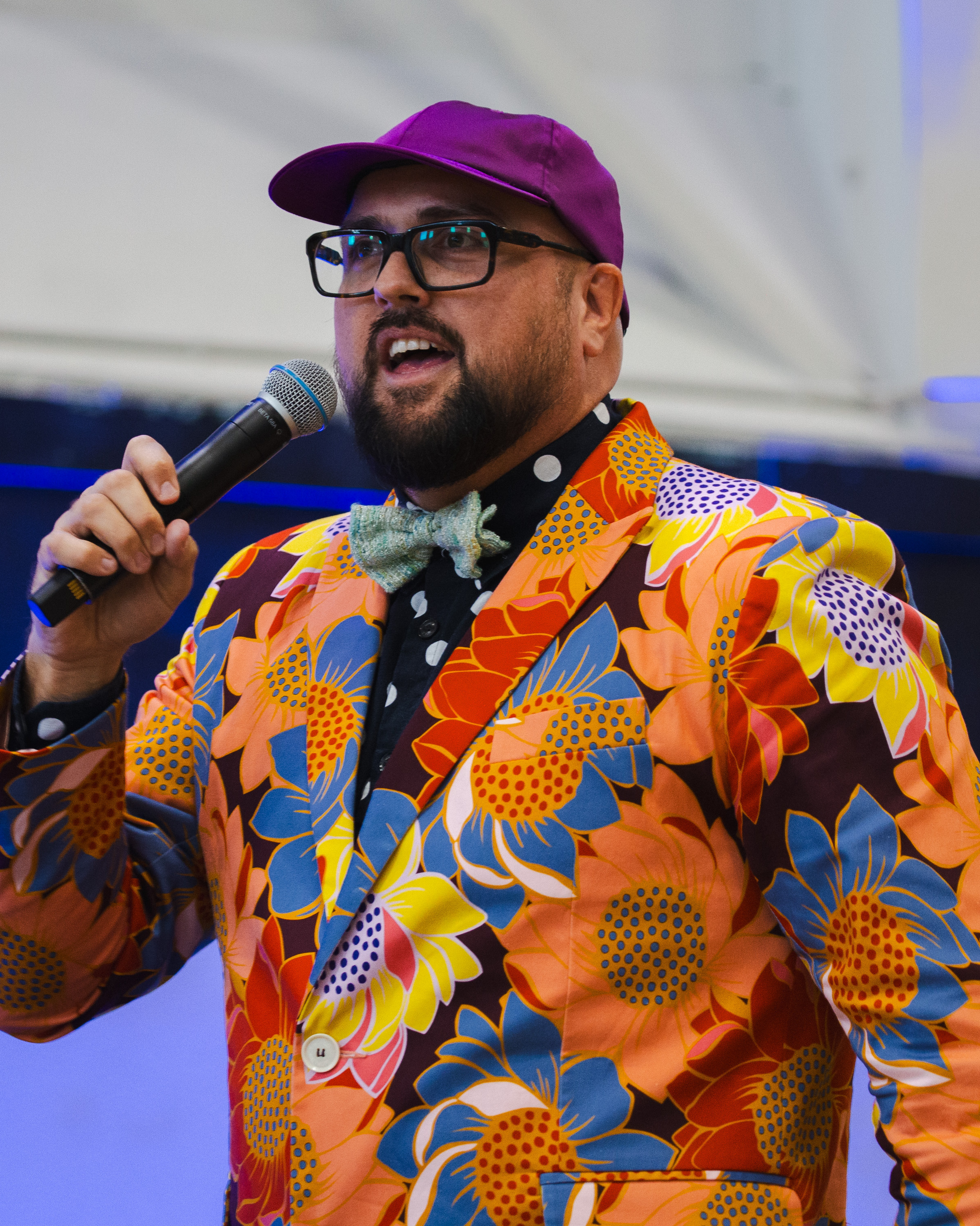
- Bird in 2023
- Born: 3 March 1986; Whangārei
- Occupation: Singer, television presenter

Luke Bird (born 3 March 1986) is a New Zealand singer and television presenter. Bird began his career as a trained opera singer and then moved into television presenting for various New Zealand television shows.

== Early life ==
Bird was born and raised in Whangārei. He trained as a chef for two years before taking up singing.

== Career ==
Bird's singing career began after he received his Bachelors Degree in Performing Arts. He has a tenor voice, and trained as an opera singer. Outside of his singing career Bird also is an occasional host for television, with his work as a host for the Whakaata Māori television channel with Lucky Dip on the Road, and previously Sidewalk Karaoke in 2017, and as a judge for The Stage in 2016.

== Awards ==
Bird received the nomination for Best Supporting Male in a Musical in 2007 at the Northern Area Performance Theatre Awards. In 2017 he was a finalist at the Judges Choice Award at The Westpac Northland Business Excellence Awards in 2017.
