= Flor (drag queen) =

Drag performer

- Born: Pedro Duque; Guatemala
- Television: House of Drag (season 2); RuPaul's Drag Race Down Under (season 3)

Flor is the stage name of Pedro Duque, a Guatemalan-New Zealand drag performer who competed on the second season of House of Drag as well as the third season of RuPaul's Drag Race Down Under and Drag Race Down Under vs. the World.

== Career ==
Flor is a drag performer who competed on House of Drag as well as the third season of RuPaul's Drag Race Down Under. She was the youngest competitor on House of Drag, and she placed eighth overall. She became a finalist of Drag Race. Flor impersonated Charo for the Snatch Game challenge.

== Personal life ==
Named after her mother, Flor is originally from Guatemala and previously lived in Auckland. She now lives in Birmingham, United Kingdom.

Flor uses she/her in drag and he/him out of drag.

== Filmography ==
=== Television ===
- House of Drag (season 2)
- RuPaul's Drag Race Down Under (season 3)
- Drag Race Down Under vs. the World
