= House of Drag =

- Genre: Reality competition
- Judges: Kita Mean; Anita Wigl'it
- Country of origin: New Zealand
- Original language: English
- No. of seasons: 2
- No. of episodes: 17

Production
- Producer: Amanda Pain
- Running time: 22–36 minutes
- Production company: Warner Bros. International TV Production New Zealand

Original release
- Network: TVNZ OnDemand; OutTV

House of Drag is a New Zealand reality competition television series produced by Warner Bros. International TV Production New Zealand for TVNZ OnDemand and OutTV. It debuted on 15 November 2018 on TVNZ OnDemand. It is hosted by New Zealand drag queens, Kita Mean and Anita Wigl'it. Season 2 premiered on 1 February 2020.

The first season saw nine contestants – eight drag queens and one drag king – undertake a series of "awkwardly fabulous" challenges. The contestant who won each week had the power to select two fellow contestants who they believe should be in the bottom for that week. Kita Mean and Anita Wigl'it then decided who would "have their light dimmed" and be sent home. The contestants competed to be crowned the winner of The House of Drag, take home a prize of $10,000, a 55" LG Smart LED TV and one year of free broadband, courtesy of the show's sponsor Chorus Limited.

== Series overview ==
Season	Premiere	Finale	Winner	Runner-up	No. of contestants	Winner's prizes
1	15 November 2018	20 December 2018	Hugo Grrrl	Lola Blades	9	$10,000; 55" LG Smart LED TV; One year of free broadband internet provided by Chorus
2	1 February 2020	4 April 2020	Spankie Jackzon	Elektra Shock	12	$10,000; Body bits from BodyFX

== Season 1 ==
=== Contestants ===
Ages, names, and cities stated are at time of filming.

Contestants of House of Drag season 1 and their backgrounds
Contestant	Age	Hometown	Outcome
Hugo Grrrl	27	Wellington, New Zealand	Winner
Lola Blades	28	Auckland, New Zealand	Runner-up
Leidy Lei	23	Auckland, New Zealand	3rd place
Bunny Holiday	23	Wellington, New Zealand	4th place
Vulga Titz	20	Wellington, New Zealand	5th place
Medulla Oblongata	32	Auckland, New Zealand	6th place
Trinity Ice	28	Auckland, New Zealand	7th place
Luna Queen of the Moon	24	Auckland, New Zealand	8th place
Shavorn Aborealis	21	Auckland, New Zealand	9th place

=== Contestant progress ===
Legend:

Hugo Grrrl won House of Drag season 1.
Lola Blades was the runner-up.
WIN indicates the contestant won the challenge.
SAFE indicates that the contestant was declared safe by the judges.
BTM (Bottom) indicates that the contestant was up for elimination.
ELIM (Eliminated) indicates that the contestant was eliminated.

Progress of contestants including placements in each episode
Contestant	Episode						
Contestant	1	2	3	4	5	6	7
Hugo Grrrl	SAFE	SAFE	WIN	SAFE	SAFE	SAFE	Winner
Lola Blades	SAFE	SAFE	BTM	SAFE	SAFE	WIN	Runner-up
Leidy Lei	SAFE	BTM	SAFE	BTM	WIN	BTM	Eliminated
Bunny Holiday	BTM	WIN	SAFE	SAFE	BTM	ELIM	
Vulga Titz	SAFE	SAFE	SAFE	WIN	ELIM		
Medulla Oblongata	WIN	SAFE	SAFE	ELIM			
Trinity Ice	SAFE	SAFE	ELIM				
Luna Queen of the Moon	SAFE	ELIM					
Shavorn Aborealis	ELIM						

=== Episodes ===
No. overall	No. in season	Title	Original release date
1	1	"Episode 1"	15 November 2018
New Series: Kita and Anita bring in 9 dragsters from all over New Zealand to live under one roof. A series of challenges will be set where only one dragster will take home the ultimate prize pack and be crowned New Zealand's first dragster.: The Glamour-puss Challenge: Photoshoot; Challenge Winner: Medulla Oblongata; Bottom Two: Bunny Holiday and Shavorn Aborealis; Eliminated: Shavorn Aborealis
2	2	"Episode 2"	15 November 2018
The remaining stars prepare for comedy night at the House of Drag. Who will rise to the top? And who will have their light dimmed and be sent packing?: The Comedy Is Gold Challenge: Perform a Stand-Up Routine; Challenge Winner: Bunny Holiday; Bottom Two: Leidy Lei and Luna Queen of the Moon; Eliminated: Luna Queen of the Moon
3	3	"Episode 3"	22 November 2018
The competition gets tough when a DIY costume challenge leaves one drag-star shaken up amongst the chaos. Which drag star will shine the brightest? And whose light will be dimmed?: Costume Chaos Challenge: Design a look out of "Crap"; Challenge Winner: Hugo Grrrl; Bottom Two: Lola Blades and Trinity Ice; Eliminated: Trinity Ice
4	4	"Episode 4"	29 November 2018
The competition amps up as the drag-stars are forced to work in teams of three and devise a skit that's inspired by Kita and Anita's drag careers. Who will light up the stage? And whose light will be dimmed?: Shit Skit Challenge: Work in teams of 3 and devise a skit inspired by Kita and Anita's careers; Challenge Winner: Vulga Titz; Bottom Two: Leidy Lei and Medulla Oblongata; Eliminated: Medulla Oblongata
5	5	"Episode 5"	6 December 2018
The drag-stars compete in a dance challenge. Plus, negative vibes surround the house as the rift between the Aucklanders and Wellingtonians continues.: Dance Days Challenge: Devise and perform a dance to an assigned genre; Challenge Winner: Leidy Lei; Bottom Two: Bunny Holiday and Vulga Titz; Eliminated: Vulga Titz
6	6	"Episode 6"	13 December 2018
The final four drag-stars are challenged to write raps about each other and battle it out to stay in the competition.: That's a Rap Challenge: Devise and perform a rap in the "House of Drag Rap Battle" about the other contestants; Challenge Winner: Lola Blades; Bottom Two: Bunny Holiday & Leidy Lei; Eliminated: Bunny Holiday
7	7	"Episode 7"	20 December 2018
Season Finale: Only three drag-stars remain and they have one last chance to battle it out for the title of Brightest Star and winner of the first ever season of House of Drag.: Lip Before They Sync Challenge: Perform a Lip-Sync to "Cherry Blossom" by Sal Valentine; Eliminated: Leidy Lei; Runner-up: Lola Blades; Winner of House of Drag Season 1: Hugo Grrrl

== Season 2 ==
=== Contestants ===
Ages, names, and cities stated are at time of filming.

Contestants of House of Drag season 2 and their backgrounds
Contestant	Age	Hometown	Outcome
Spankie Jackzon (Note: Lilly Loca, Miss Geena and Spankie Jackzon entered the competition in the fourth episode.)	34	Palmerston North, New Zealand	Winner
Elektra Shock	26	Auckland, New Zealand	Runner-up
Claire Voyant	27	Hershey, United States	3rd place
Bionica	22	Auckland, New Zealand	4th place
Miss Geena	29	Auckland, New Zealand	5th place
Lilly Loca	32	Auckland, New Zealand	6th place
Willy SmacknTush	32	Wellington, New Zealand	7th place
Flor	21	Auckland, New Zealand	8th place
Jen Tre Fire	23	Auckland, New Zealand	9th place (Note: Jen Tre Fire quit the competition on the fifth episode, placing ninth.)
Kelly Fornia	25	Wellington, New Zealand	10th place
Rhubarb Rouge	32	Palmerston North, New Zealand	11th place
Stabitha	34	Wellington, New Zealand	12th place

=== Contestant progress ===
Legend:

Spankie Jackzon won House of Drag season 2.
Elektra Shock was the runner-up.
WIN indicates the contestant won the challenge.
SAFE indicates that the contestant was declared safe by the judges.
BTM (Bottom) indicates that the contestant was up for elimination.
QUIT indicates that Jen Tre Fire quit the competition.
ELIM (Eliminated) indicates that the contestant was eliminated.

Progress of contestants including placements in each episode
Contestant	Episode									
Contestant	1	2	3	4	5	6	7	8	9	10
Spankie Jackzon				WIN	BTM	WIN	BTM	WIN	BTM	Winner
Elektra Shock	SAFE	WIN	WIN	WIN	SAFE	SAFE	SAFE	SAFE	WIN	Runner-up
Claire Voyant	SAFE	SAFE	SAFE	SAFE	SAFE	SAFE	WIN	BTM	SAFE	Eliminated
Bionica	SAFE	WIN	SAFE	ELIM		BTM	SAFE	SAFE	ELIM	
Miss Geena				SAFE	WIN	SAFE	SAFE	ELIM		
Lilly Loca				BTM2	SAFE	SAFE	ELIM			
Willy SmacknTush	BTM	BTM	SAFE	SAFE	SAFE	ELIM				
Flor	WIN	SAFE	SAFE	SAFE	ELIM					
Jen Tre Fire	SAFE	SAFE	BTM	SAFE	QUIT					
Kelly Fornia	SAFE	SAFE	ELIM							
Rhubarb Rouge	SAFE	ELIM								
Stabitha	ELIM									

=== Episodes ===
No. overall	No. in season	Title	Original release date
8	1	"Episode 1"	1 February 2020
New Series: Kita and Anita welcome a brand new group of Drag Stars to the mansion. A series of challenges will be set where only one dragster will take home the ultimate prize pack and be crowned New Zealand's next dragster.: Costume Challenge: Design a look from Kita and Anita's old outfits.; Challenge Winner: Flor; Bottom Two: Stabitha and Willy SmacknTush; Eliminated: Stabitha
9	2	"Episode 2"	8 February 2020
The Drag Stars pair up to compete in a fabulous dance challenge.: Twinkle Toes Dance Challenge: Pair up and choreograph a dance for a song.; Challenge Winner: Bionica and Elektra Shock; Bottom Two: Rhubarb Rouge and Willy SmacknTush; Eliminated: Rhubarb Rouge
10	3	"Episode 3"	15 February 2020
Alliances begin to form, and the Drag Stars are challenged to create animal inspired make up looks.: Animal Themed Make-up Challenge: Using a onesie as inspiration, create an animal themed outfit.; Challenge Winner: Elektra Shock; Bottom Two: Kelly Fornia and Jen Tre Fire; Eliminated: Kelly Fornia
11	4	"Episode 4"	22 February 2020
Kita and Anita arrive to drop a bombshell - three new Drag Stars will be joining the competition! The stars had to impersonate a celebrity at the dinner table.: New Entry: Lilly Loca, Miss Geena and Spankie Jackzon; Celebrity Impersonation Challenge: Dress up like a famous celebrity and have a dinner party.; Challenge Winner: Elektra Shock and Spankie Jackzon; Bottom Two: Bionica and Lilly Loca; Eliminated: Bionica
12	5	"Episode 5"	29 February 2020
Kita and Anita set the Drag Stars an acting challenge. The remaining stars had to get divided into 2 teams and had to perform a skit. Plus, one contestant makes a shock exit.: Acting Challenge: Split into teams and prepare a scene for an acting challenge.; Quit: Jen Tre Fire; Challenge Winner: Miss Geena; Bottom Two: Flor and Spankie Jackzon; Eliminated: Flor
13	6	"Episode 6"	7 March 2020
Bionica makes a surprise return, and the Drag Stars are challenged to prepare an MC routine to use while hosting Drag Bingo.: Re-entry: Bionica; Hosting Challenge: Prepare content for and host a game of Drag Bingo.; Challenge Winner: Spankie Jackzon; Bottom Two: Bionica and Willy SmacknTush; Eliminated: Willy SmacknTush
14	7	"Episode 7"	14 March 2020
The Drag Stars are each challenged to become drag 'parents' to a group of fresh-faced clients, giving them full-on drag makeovers!: Make-over Challenge: Drag up a client and initiate them into your Drag Family; Challenge Winner: Claire Voyant; Bottom Two: Lilly Loca and Spankie Jackzon; Eliminated: Lilly Loca
15	8	"Episode 8"	21 March 2020
We're down to the final five, and the pressure is really starting to sink in! This time, the Drag Stars have the opportunity to show off their personalities in a live performance.: Drag Performance Freestyle Challenge: Create a live performance; Challenge Winner: Spankie Jackzon; Bottom Two: Claire Voyant and Miss Geena; Eliminated: Miss Geena
16	9	"Episode 9"	28 March 2020
The remaining Drag Stars have just two hours to write a verse for Kita and Anita's new song!: Writing & Recording Challenge: Write your own verse for Kita and Anita's new song.; Challenge Winner: Elektra Shock; Bottom Two: Bionica and Spankie Jackzon; Eliminated: Bionica
17	10	"Episode 10"	4 April 2020
Season Finale: The final three contestants must lip sync, to songs provided by Kita and Anita, in the observatory to determine who will win House of Drag Season 2!: Lip Sync Extravaganza Challenge: Perform a Lip-Sync.; Eliminated: Claire Voyant; Runner-up: Elektra Shock; Winner of House of Drag Season 2: Spankie Jackzon
