= Anita Wigl'it =

New Zealand drag queen

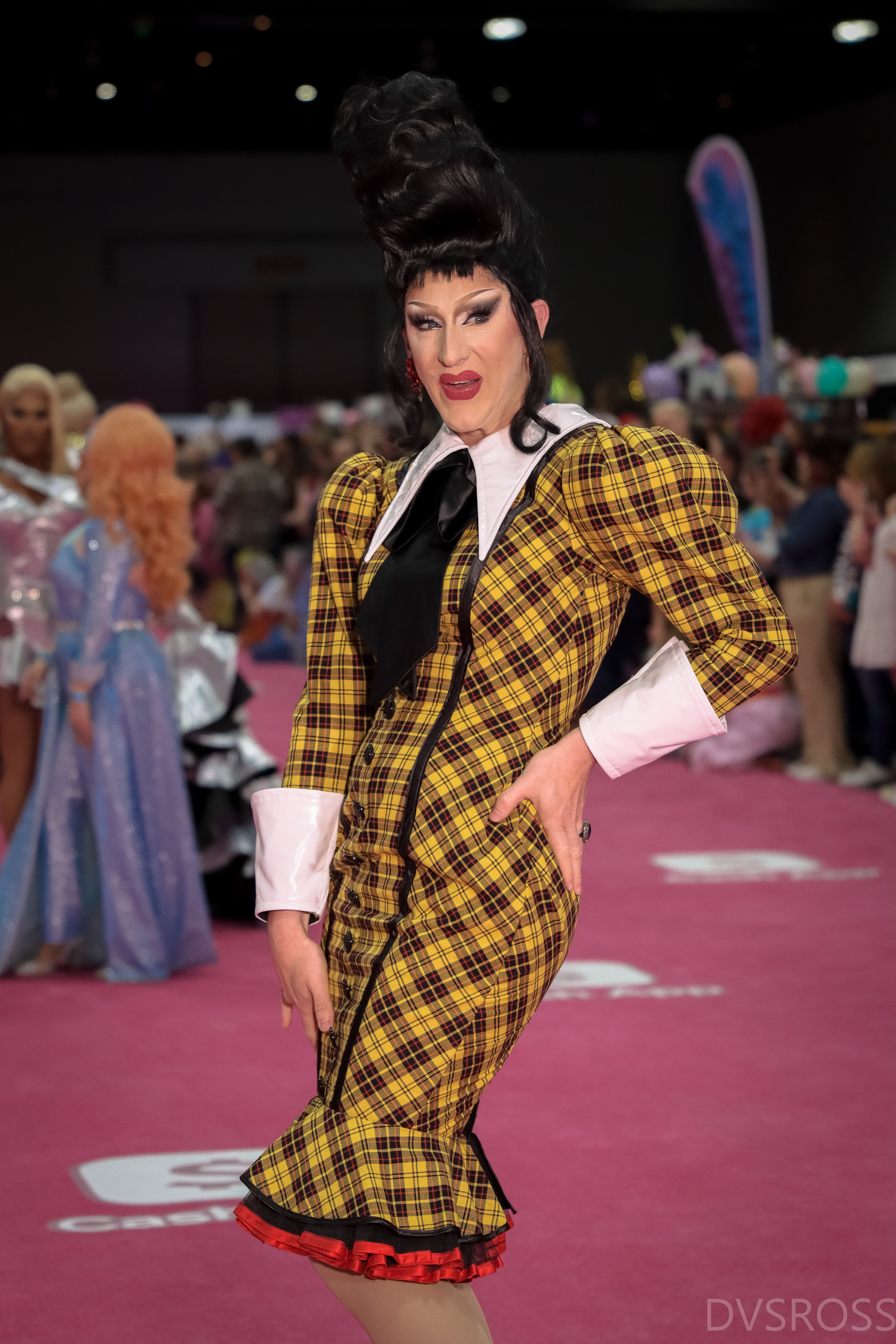
- Anita Wigl'it at RuPaul's DragCon LA, 2023
- Born: Nick Hall; Yeovil, England, UK
- Education: University of Auckland (BM); University of British Columbia (MM)
- Occupation: Drag queen
- Known for: House of Drag; RuPaul's Drag Race Down Under; Canada's Drag Race: Canada vs. the World
- Website: anitawiglit.co.nz

Nick Hall (formerly Kennedy-Hall), better known by the stage name Anita Wigl'it, is a British-New Zealand based drag performer best known for hosting House of Drag from 2018 to 2020, and competing on the first season of RuPaul's Drag Race Down Under in 2021. She competed in Canada's Drag Race: Canada vs. the World in 2022.

== Early life ==
Kennedy-Hall was born in Yeovil, England and moved to Auckland at age 10. He completed a Bachelor of Music and Bachelor of Music (Honours) in music performance (with first class honours) at University of Auckland and a Masters of Music degree at the University of British Columbia in Vancouver, British Columbia, before returning to New Zealand and joining the Royal New Zealand Navy Band as a trumpet player. His husband Shameel Kennedy, under the name Ivanna Drink, competed on the third season of Drag Race Down Under. In August 2023, the couple announced that they had separated.

== Career ==
In 2018, Anita and Kita Mean were both judges on the New Zealand drag show House of Drag from 2018 to 2020, where they became known as the duo "Kita and Anita". The duo are also partners in Caluzzi, a drag cabaret in downtown Auckland.

In March 2021, both Anita and Kita were announced as contestants to compete on the first season of RuPaul's Drag Race Down Under. During the show, Anita won the Snatch Game in episode 2 for impersonating Queen Elizabeth II, and was eliminated in episode 4 after losing a lip sync to Karen from Finance.

Unlike a regular season of the original U.S. RuPaul's Drag Race, no Miss Congeniality was crowned by RuPaul in the series; however, a poll of the eliminated queens in post-show interviews with the entertainment website PopBuzz saw Anita Wigl'it named as their choice for Miss Congeniality.

She currently co-hosts the Kita and Anita's Happy Hour podcast alongside Kita Mean.

She was one of nine queens to compete in the first season of "Canada's Drag Race: Canada vs. the World". Despite winning Snatch Game in her original season, she was in the bottom 2 for her Snatch Game impression of Adele in episode 2. She was eliminated in episode 3 by Silky Nutmeg Ganache.

== Filmography ==
=== Television ===
Year	Title	Role	Notes
2018–2020	House of Drag	Judge	2 seasons (17 episodes)
2021	RuPaul's Drag Race Down Under	Contestant	8th place (4 episodes)
2021	Breakfast	Guest	
2021	Have You Been Paying Attention?	Guest Quiz Master	Season 2, Episode 17
2022	Canada's Drag Race: Canada vs. the World	Contestant	7th Place (4 episodes)

- Bring Back My Girls (2024)

=== Web series ===
Year	Title	Role	Notes	Ref
2021	Re: News	Herself	Guest with Kita Mean	
2021	PopBuzz Meets	Herself	Guest with Art Simone	
2021	BuzzFeed Oz!	Herself	Guest with Art Simone & Elektra Shock	
2022	Meet the Queens	Herself	Stand-alone special	

== Discography ==
=== Featured singles ===
Title	Year	Album
"Queens Down Under" (Outback Fake Hoes Version) (with The Cast of RuPaul's Drag Race Down Under, season 1	2021	Non-album singles
"Bonjour, Hi!" (Touché Version) (The cast of Canada's Drag Race: Canada vs The World)	2022	Non-album singles

== Awards and nominations ==
Year	Award ceremony	Category	Work	Results	Ref.
2021	New Zealand Television Awards	Television Personality of the Year	RuPaul's Drag Race Down Under	Nominated	
