= Kita Mean =

New Zealand drag queen

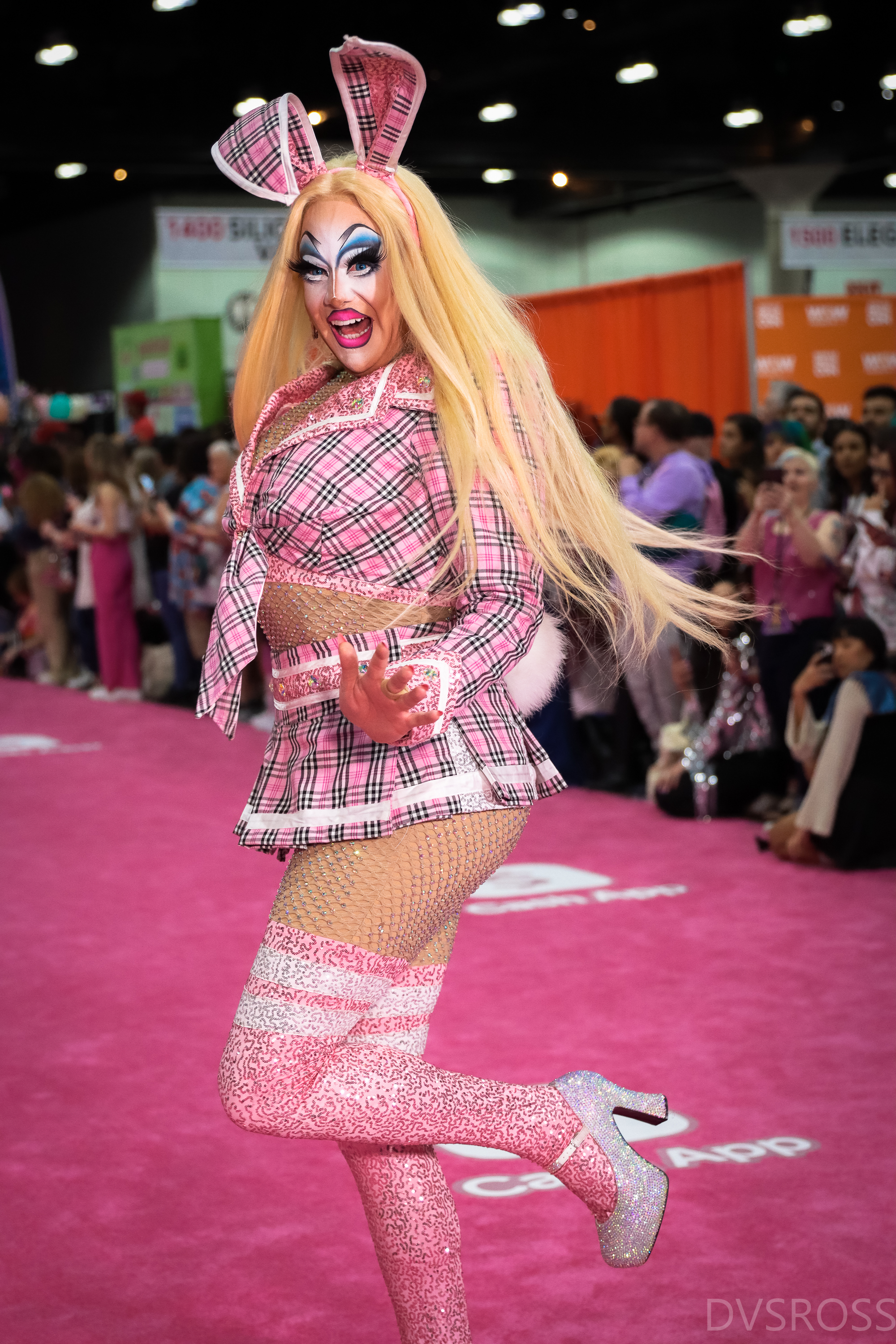
- Kita Mean at RuPaul's DragCon LA, 2023
- Born: Nick Nash; 14 April 1986 (age 38)
- Occupation: Drag queen
- Known for: House of Drag; RuPaul's Drag Race Down Under
- Website: kitamean.com

Nick Nash (born 14 April 1986), better known by the stage name Kita Mean, is a New Zealand drag performer best known for hosting House of Drag and winning the first season of RuPaul's Drag Race Down Under.

== Career ==
Kita and Anita Wigl'it were both judges on the New Zealand drag competition show House of Drag from 2018 to 2020, where they became known as the duo Kita and Anita. The two queens started a monthly event called Drag Wars for local New Zealand drag artists to perform and they co-own the Caluzzi Cabaret and Phoenix Venue in Auckland.

In March 2021, Kita and Anita were announced as competitors on the first season of RuPaul's Drag Race Down Under. Kita won the makeover challenge in episode 6, which involved giving a rugby player a makeover, and landed in the bottom two in episode 7, sending home Elektra Shock. On 19 June 2021, Kita Mean was announced by RuPaul as the first winner of RuPaul's Drag Race Down Under.

In December 2021, she starred in Beauty and the Beast, a pantomime show, at the Isaac Theatre Royal.

She currently co-hosts the Kita and Anita's Happy Hour podcast alongside Anita Wigl'it.

== Filmography ==
=== Television ===
Year	Title	Role	Notes
2018	House of Drag	Herself (judge)	Season 1
2020	House of Drag	Herself (judge)	Season 2
2021	RuPaul's Drag Race Down Under	Herself (contestant)	Season 1, Winner
2021	My Life Is Murder	Needa	1 episode
2021	Have You Been Paying Attention?	Herself (guest quiz master)	1 episode
2022	RuPaul's Drag Race Down Under	Herself	Season 2, Outgoing Queen
2023	Cubicle Confessions	Herself	1 episode

=== Web series ===
Year	Title	Role	Notes	Ref
2022	Binge Queens	Herself	RuPaul's Drag Race Down Under - Series 2	

Preceded by —	Winner of RuPaul's Drag Race Down Under; Australian/New Zealand season 1	Succeeded by Spankie Jackzon
