= Bissap =

Bissap may refer to:

- Hibiscus tea, known as bissap
- Roselle (plant), the plant from which the drink is made
