= Zobo =

- Zobo is the word in the Hausa language for the edible plant Hibiscus sabdariffa, as well as the drink made from its petals. Zobo is purple in colour from the plant Roselle (Hibiscus Sabdariffa). It is popular in the Northern Nigeria called Zoborodo.
- Zobo was the project codename for the Triumph Herald
- A hybrid between the zebu and the yak
- Stéphane Zobo (born 2000), Cameroonian footballer
