= Karkadeh =

Hibiscus beverage consumed in Egypt and Sudan

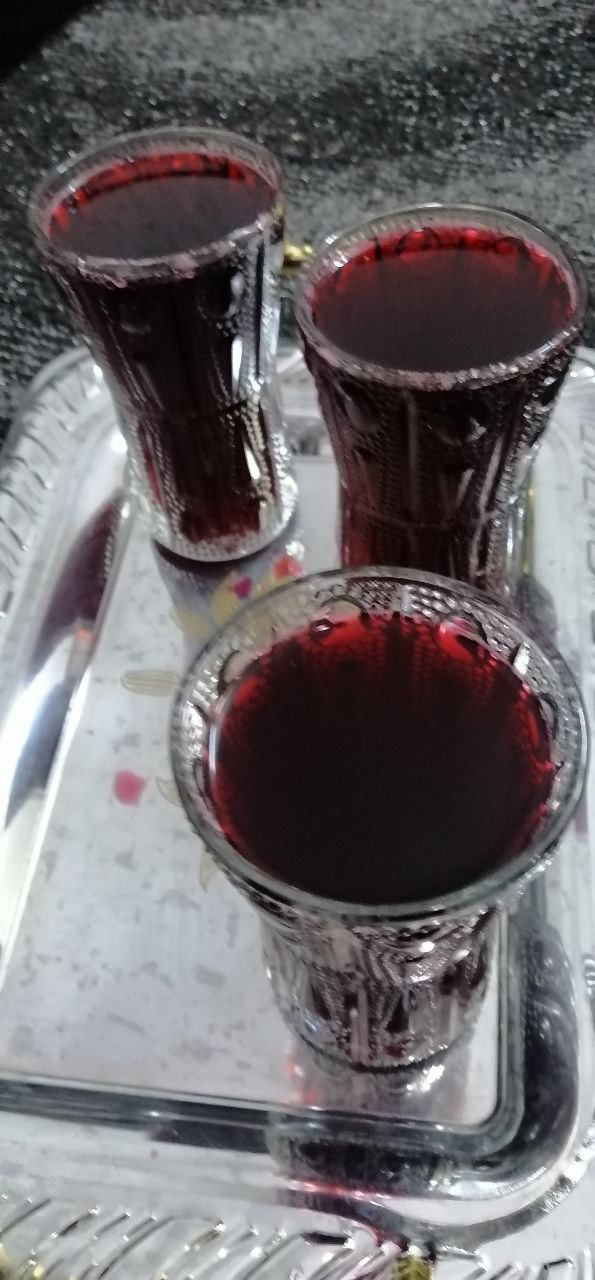
- Associated cuisine: Egyptian cuisine, Sudanese cuisine
- Serving temperature: Hot and cold
- Main ingredients: Dried hibiscus petals, sugar

Karkadeh (Arabic: كركديه) is a traditional beverage made in Egypt and Sudan by infusing dried petals from the roselle flower in water. Renowned for its deep red color and tart flavor, karkadeh can be enjoyed both hot and cold, serving as a refreshing drink across various seasons.

== In Egypt ==
To prepare karkadeh, dried roselle petals are combined with water and brought to a boil. The mixture is then simmered for an additional 5 to 10 minutes to extract the full flavor of the roselle. After boiling, the liquid is strained to remove the petals, and sugar is added to achieve the desired sweetness. Once cooled, the beverage can be refrigerated and served chilled, often garnished with fresh mint leaves or a slice of lime.

Alternatively, karkadeh can be prepared using a cold brew method. In this approach, dried roselle petals are soaked in cold water and left to steep overnight. The following day, the mixture is strained, sweetened to taste, and served chilled over ice. This method yields a milder flavor compared to the traditional boiling technique.

Today, dried roselle is commonly available in tea bags in Egypt for a faster preparation of hot roselle tea, but often yield a milder flavor compared to the traditional method.

=== Cultural significance ===
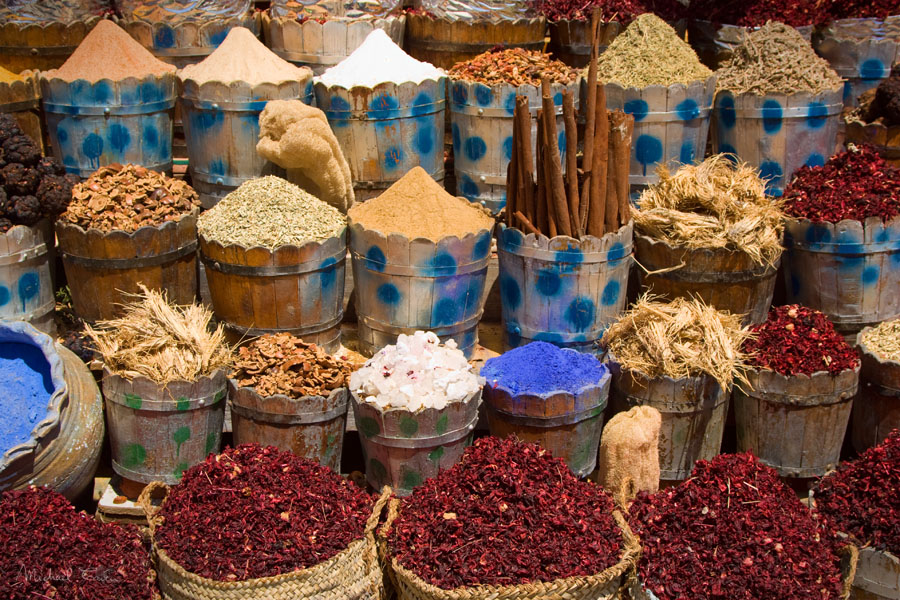
Roselle and other herbs in Hurghada

Evidence indicates that the plant from which the beverage is made, and that the beverage itself, were consumed by ancient Egyptians as early as the Middle Kingdom. Karkadeh holds a prominent place in Egyptian social and cultural practices. Traditionally, it is served during wedding celebrations, symbolizing joy and prosperity. The beverage is also popular during the holy month of Ramadan, where it is commonly consumed to break the fast.

Many Egyptians associate karkadeh with ancient Egyptian traditions. It is believed that the drink was favored by the pharaohs and has been consumed for centuries due to its perceived health benefits. This traditional belief has led to karkadeh being affectionately termed the "tea of the pharaohs".

The beverage is widely available throughout Egypt, from street vendors to traditional cafés. In Muslim communities, where alcohol consumption is limited, karkadeh also serves as a popular non-alcoholic alternative during celebrations and gatherings.

The preparation of karkadeh involves soaking dried roselle petals, a practice that has become a cherished ritual in Egyptian households. It often involves the participation of multiple family members, with the beverage typically consumed together.

== See also ==
- Egyptian cuisine
- Roselle tea
- Zobo
