= Red drink =

Soul food beverage

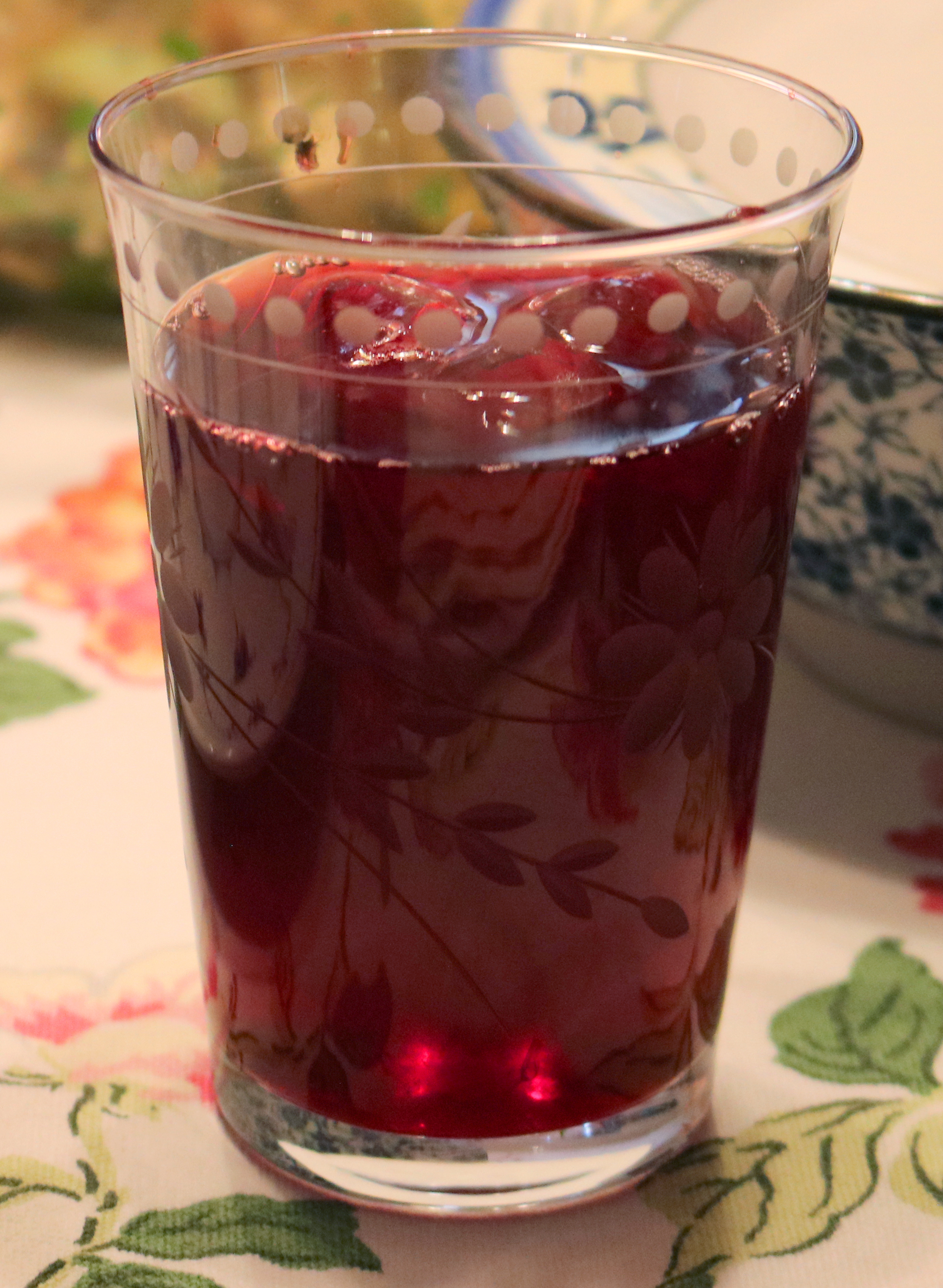
- Hibiscus tea
- Course: Drink
- Associated cuisine: Soul food
- Serving temperature: Cold

Red drink is any of an assortment of red-colored beverages consumed with soul food. During the transatlantic slave trade, enslaved Africans brought kola nut drinks and hibiscus tea, traditional red-colored beverages of West African cuisine, to the Americas and adapted new red drinks based on the ingredients available to them. Hibiscus tea, pink lemonade, red Kool-Aid, and red sodas such as Big Red are all modern red drinks in the United States. Red drink is especially associated with Juneteenth.

== History ==
Historians have suggested that red beverages served to connect African diaspora communities during and after the transatlantic slave trade. Kola nut beverages and hibiscus tea are popular red-colored drinks in West African cuisine and were brought to Caribbean plantations during the slave trade by enslaved people, who carried seeds with them across the Atlantic Ocean. Kola nut was an original ingredient and the namesake of cola, and culinary historian Adrian Miller calls cola a red drink "in disguise". Hibiscus tea particularly became associated with celebrations in the Caribbean as the roselle flower, from which the infusion is made, blooms around Christmas. Enslaved people and their descendants adapted hibiscus tea, or bissap, recipes around the ingredients available in the Caribbean, and these beverages became known as "sorrel" and agua de Jamaica. Both kola nut drinks and hibiscus tea were prized on Caribbean plantations for medicinal properties, as kola nut was thought to restore energy to exhausted slaves and cure stomach ailments, while hibiscus tea was used to treat pain, inflammation, and high blood pressure.

In the United States, where kola nut and hibiscus are more difficult to cultivate, African American communities have consumed other red drinks since at least the 1860s. During the American Civil War and Reconstruction era, a red-hued mix of molasses and water was popular at Black American holiday celebrations and also served as communion wine in Black churches. Sassafras tea was also popular among slaves in the American South, and mentions of "red whiskey" are recorded in Southern newspapers and magazines of the era. By the 1880s, pink lemonade had become popular among African Americans, and by the 1890s, the drink was associated with Emancipation Day celebrations; by the 1920s, red soft drinks were popular at Juneteenth celebrations. Red Kool-Aid has been referred to as "the official soul food drink", and Black American soldiers deployed to the Vietnam War often received packages of red Kool-Aid mailed by family members. Molasses-and-water mix, pink lemonade, red sodas (such as Big Red), and Kool-Aid were all inexpensive and therefore accessible drink options for economically disadvantaged African Americans in the rural American South after the civil war.

The characteristic red color of the drink has been described as representing the blood shed by enslaved ancestors and symbolizing resilience and joy. The symbolic nature of the color may originate with religious and spiritual traditions around the color red in West African cultures. Miller, describing the importance of red drink within soul food, states that red drink symbolizes a social connection to family, friends, and the entire African diaspora.

== Association with Juneteenth ==
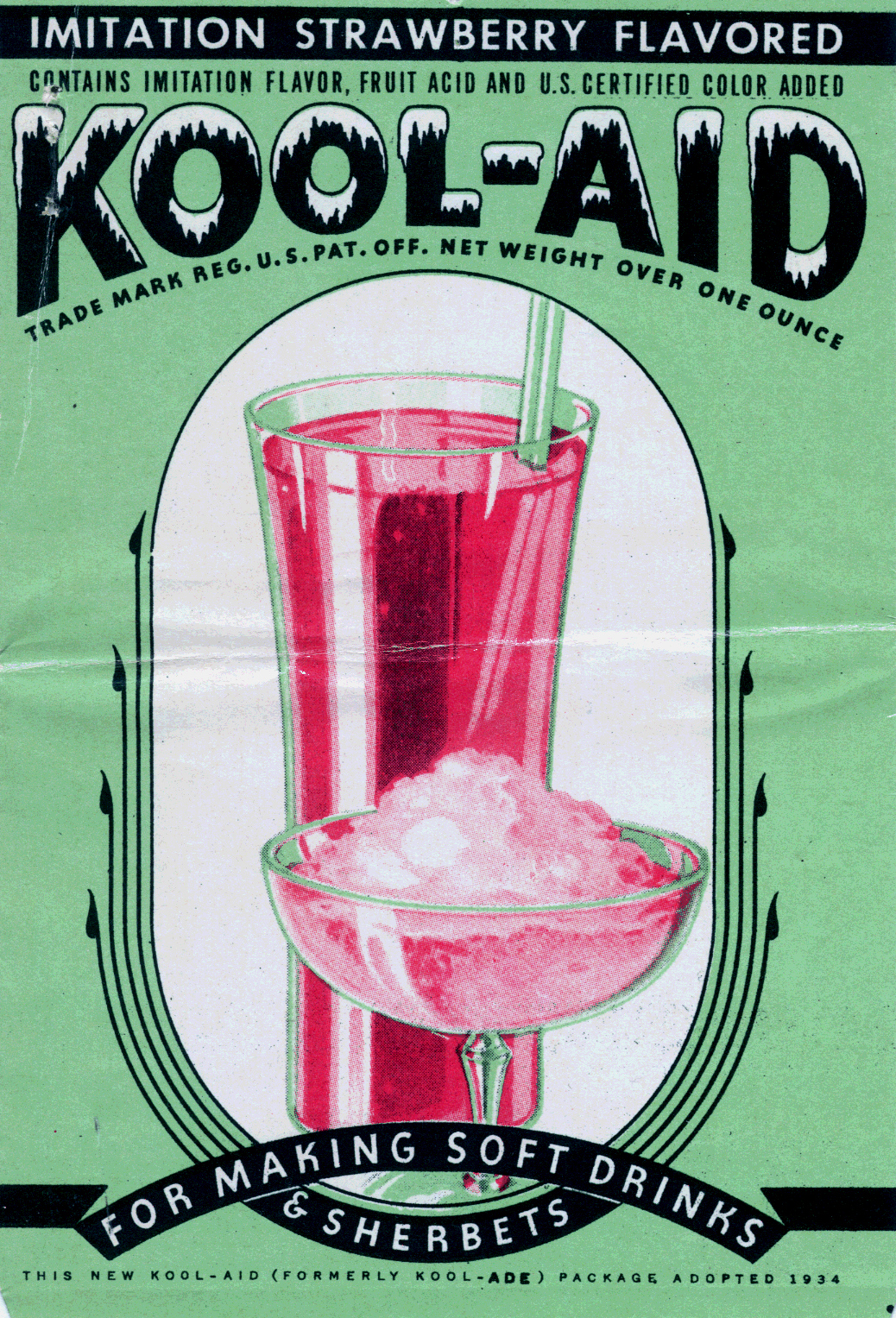
1934 Kool-Aid advertisement

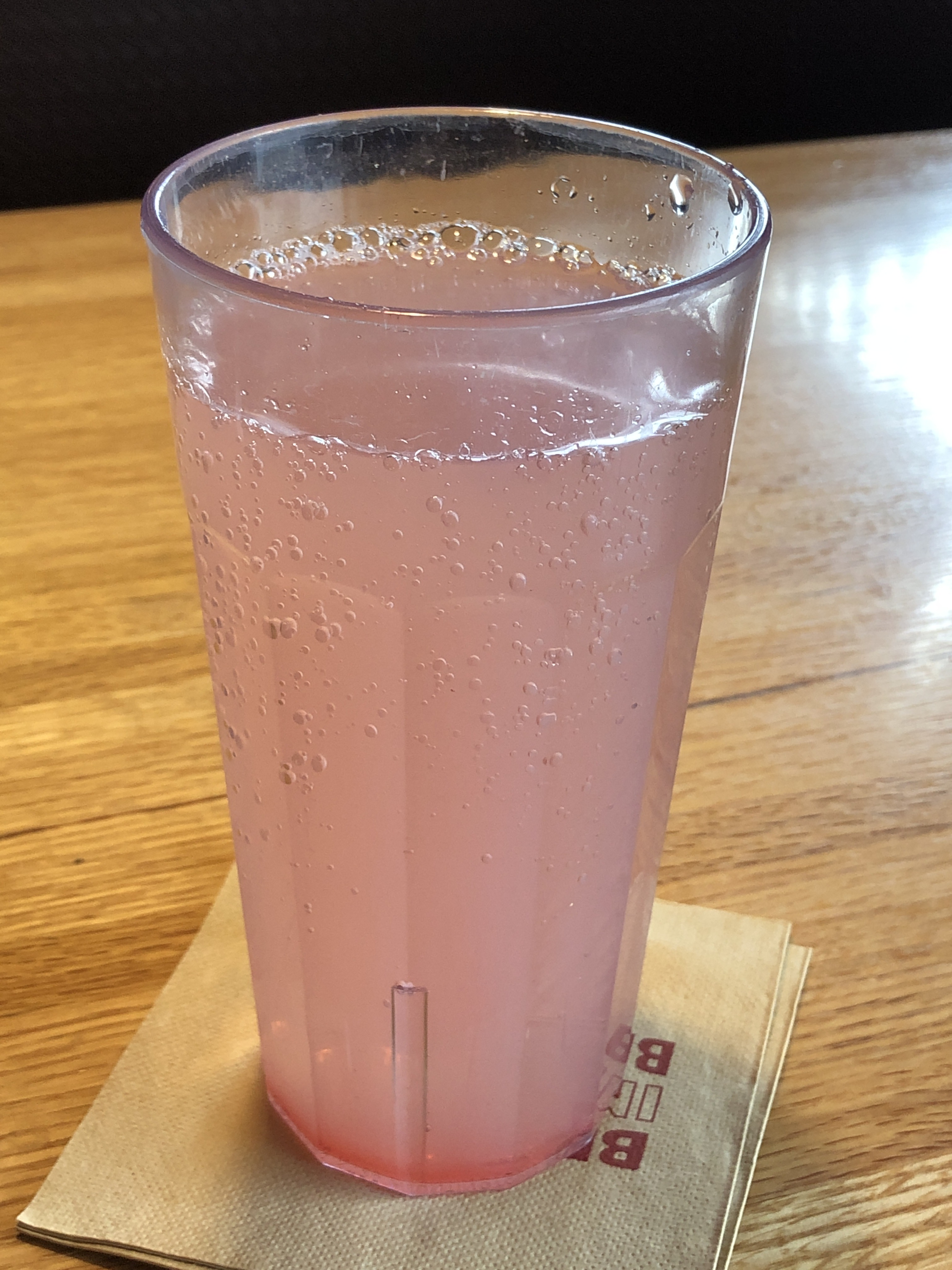
Pink lemonade

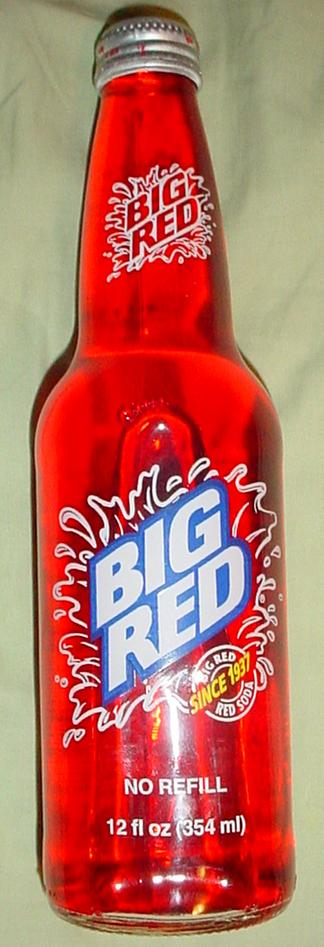
Big Red

Juneteenth, the commemoration of the end of slavery in the United States via the federal enforcement of the Emancipation Proclamation in Texas over two years after its issuance, is celebrated annually in the U.S. on June 19. Red foods and drinks, their color symbolizing the resilience and ingenuity of enslaved African Americans, are traditionally served at Juneteenth celebrations.

Several folk stories are told about the significance of red beverages to Juneteenth. Variously, the red may symbolize joy, the blood shed by the enslaved ancestors of African Americans, or the resilience of those enslaved people. It may also be a direct reference to West African kola nut drinks and hibiscus tea or red as a color associated with royalty in West Africa, or may simply serve as a connection to previous generations of African Americans who consumed red drinks.
