= Zobo (drink) =

Nigerian hibiscus beverage

Zobo is a tea native to West Africa made from the hibiscus plant, roselle (Hibiscus sabdariffa), with the addition of fruits and spices. It is called zobo in Nigeria and sobolo in Ghana. It is usually consumed cold and has a tangy, rich flavour.

The drink spread from Africa to the Caribbean via way of the Atlantic slave trade. Zobo typically uses more ingredients than its new world offshoots. Zobo is a rich source of vitamins, minerals and antioxidants.

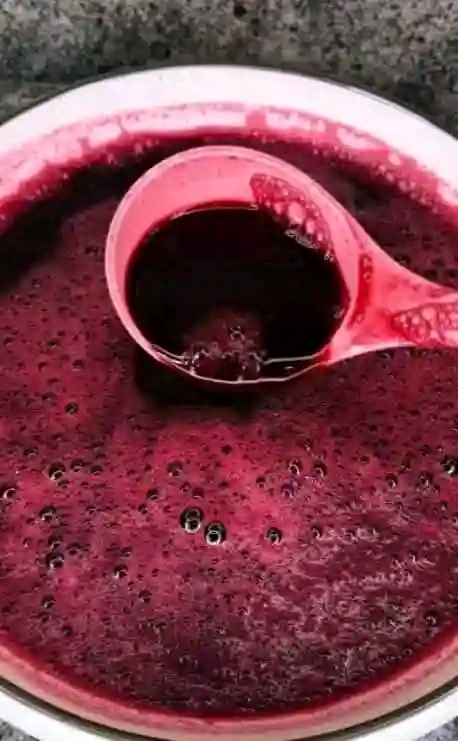
Zobo drink

== Preparation ==
Zobo is made with dried hibiscus sepals, which are washed and then boiled in water to extract the flavour. As it boils, spices like cloves, cinnamon stick, ginger and black peppercorns are added. Some add star anise or other spices. The juice is either boiled with pineapple chunks or peels, or pineapple juice is added after boiling. Orange juice or other juices are optional. The juice is sweetened with either one or a combination of sugar, honey, blended dates or fruit flavoring powder concentrates. Slices of fruits, like oranges or limes, can be added. It is cooled before drinking.

== Versions ==
Versions of this drink, though simpler in ingredients, exist in the Caribbean by way of Africa, called sorrel in Jamaica. From there it spread to Latin America, becoming agua de Jamaica in Mexico.

== See also ==
- Hibiscus tea
