= Hibiscus tea =

Drink made from hibiscus flowers

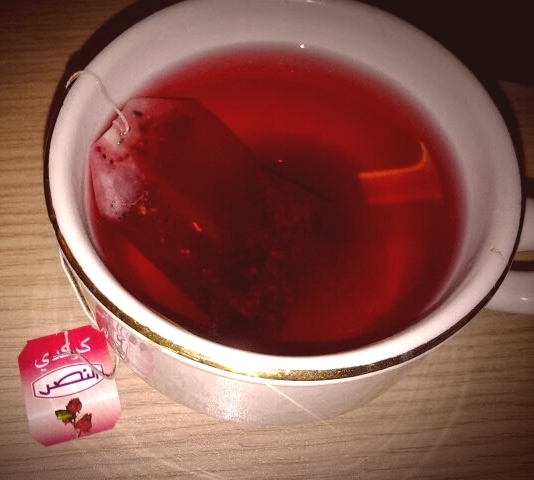
- Alternative names: sobolo, zobo, karkade, agua de jamaica, sorrel
- Place of origin: West Africa
- Serving temperature: Hot or cold
- Main ingredients: Roselle flowers, water

Hibiscus tea (served hot), or roselle juice (served cold), is an infusion made from the crimson or deep magenta-colored sepals or calyces of the roselle flower (Hibiscus sabdariffa). It is consumed both hot and cold and has a tart, strong cranberry-like flavor.

The plant is native to and domesticated in West Africa for its edible seeds and later for leaf and calyx production (for drinks and sauces).

== Common names ==
The drink made out of the flowers is known as bissap in Burkina Faso and Senegal, zobo in Nigeria or sobolo in Ghana. Although generally called a juice, which is sweetened and chilled, it is technically an infusion, and when served hot is called hibiscus tea.

== Description ==
In juice form, hibiscus or roselle juice is a dark, purple-red drink usually found cold in many West African countries. It tastes slightly like grape juice or cranberry juice, and can be served with mint leaves. It can also be served with any flavouring, such as with orange essence or ginger. In Ghana, Nigeria, and Senegal, roselle juice is often served cold, while in Egypt and Sudan, it is often served warm.

=== Phytochemicals ===
The plant contains organic acids, polysaccharides, flavonoids and particularly anthocyanins, which provide the purple-red color.

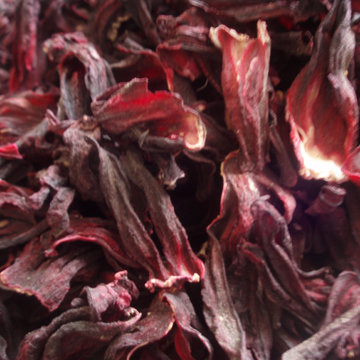
Dried hibiscus calyces

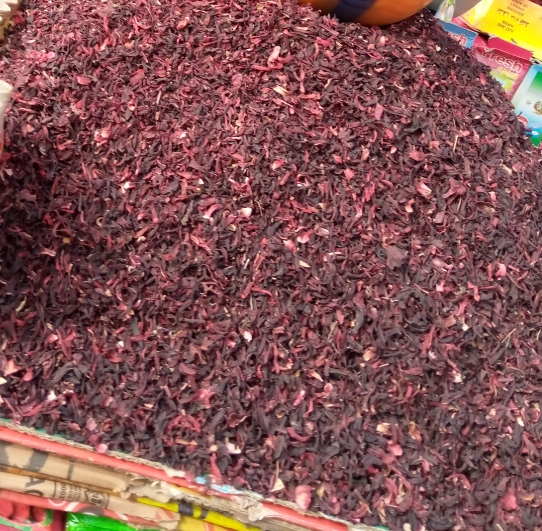
Dried hibiscus leaves

== Consumption ==
=== Africa ===
The roselle hibiscus used to make the tea was domesticated in Africa, particularly the Western Sudan. West Africans have long cultivated and used roselle extensively. It is featured in numerous sauces, soups, and drinks. In Africa, hibiscus tea is commonly sold in markets and the dried flowers can be found throughout West and East Africa. Many variations of the drink are consumed in West Africa and parts of Central Africa.

Karkadé is served hot or chilled with ice. It is consumed in some parts of North Africa, especially in Egypt and Sudan. In Egypt and Sudan, wedding celebrations are traditionally toasted with a glass of hibiscus tea. On a typical street in Cairo, many vendors and open-air cafés sell the drink. Ancient Egyptians revered karkadeh as a restorative drink, sometimes given the moniker “Tea of the Pharaohs,” praised for its flavor and vibrant red pigment used in dyes and ceremonies associated with the gods.

=== Americas ===
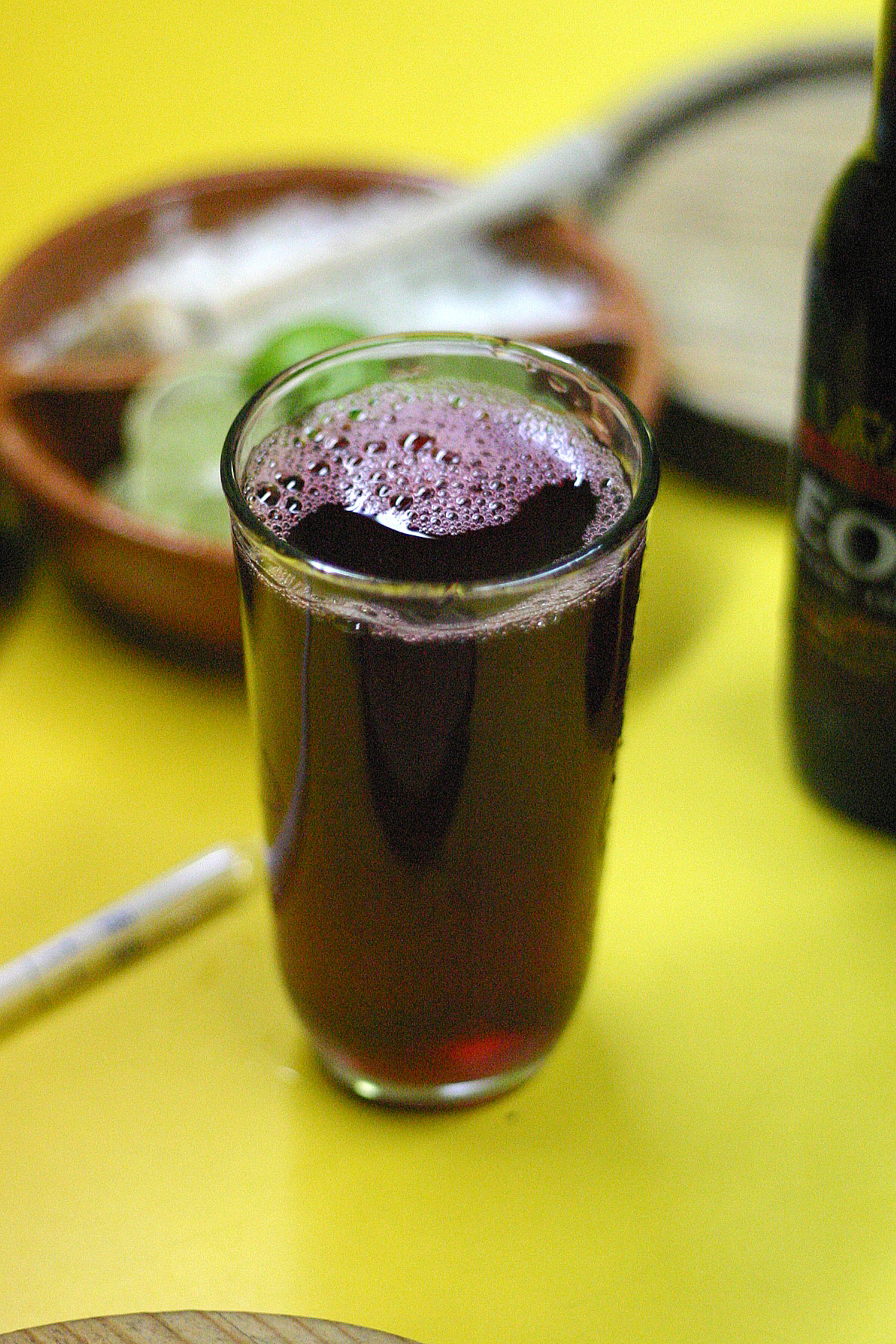
A glass of cold agua de flor de Jamaica in a Cuernavaca restaurant

Agua de flor de Jamaica, also called agua de Jamaica and rosa de Jamaica, is consumed in Mexico, Central America, and parts of South America and the Caribbean. It was introduced to the region by enslaved Africans, and likely first cultivated in Brazil where it is used both as a beverage and in traditional cuisines. It is one of several common aguas frescas, which are inexpensive beverages typically made from fresh juices or extracts. It is served chilled, and in Jamaica, this spice-infused drink is a tradition at Christmas, served with fruitcake or sweet potato pudding.

In American soul food cuisine, hibiscus tea is included in a category of "red drinks" associated with West Africa. However, Caribbean bissap and sorrel recipes, which were bought to North America by immigrants, have been largely adapted with other spices native to West Africa.

=== Southeast Asia ===
In Thailand, most commonly, roselle is prepared as a cold beverage, heavily sweetened and poured over ice, similar to sweetened fruit juices. Plastic bags filled with ice and sweetened krachiap can be found outside most schools and in local markets. It is less commonly made into a wine. It is sometimes combined with Chinese tea leaves, in the ratio of 4:1 by weight (1/5 Chinese tea). The beverage is also consumed in Malaysia, Cambodia, and Indonesia.

=== Europe ===
In Italy, hibiscus tea, known as carcadè or karkadè (from the Arabic word كَرْكَديه [karkaˈdiːh]), is usually consumed hot, often with the addition of sugar and lemon juice or orange slices. First introduced from Eritrea, it was widely used as a tea substitute when the country was hit by trade sanctions for its invasion of Abyssinia. In other European countries, it is used as an ingredient in mixed herbal tea (especially with malva flowers or rose hips in the mix, to enhance colouring).

== Zobo ==
Zobo is a local beverage in Nigeria made from dried hibiscus leaf and other ingredients. The drink is commonly sold in restaurants and on roadsides.

Zobo is made by boiling hibiscus leaves alongside ginger and cloves for less than an hour. It can be served hot or chilled. The solids are removed with a sieve, leaving behind the zobo juice. The roselle drink has a flavour similar to cranberry juice and is ruby-red in colour.
