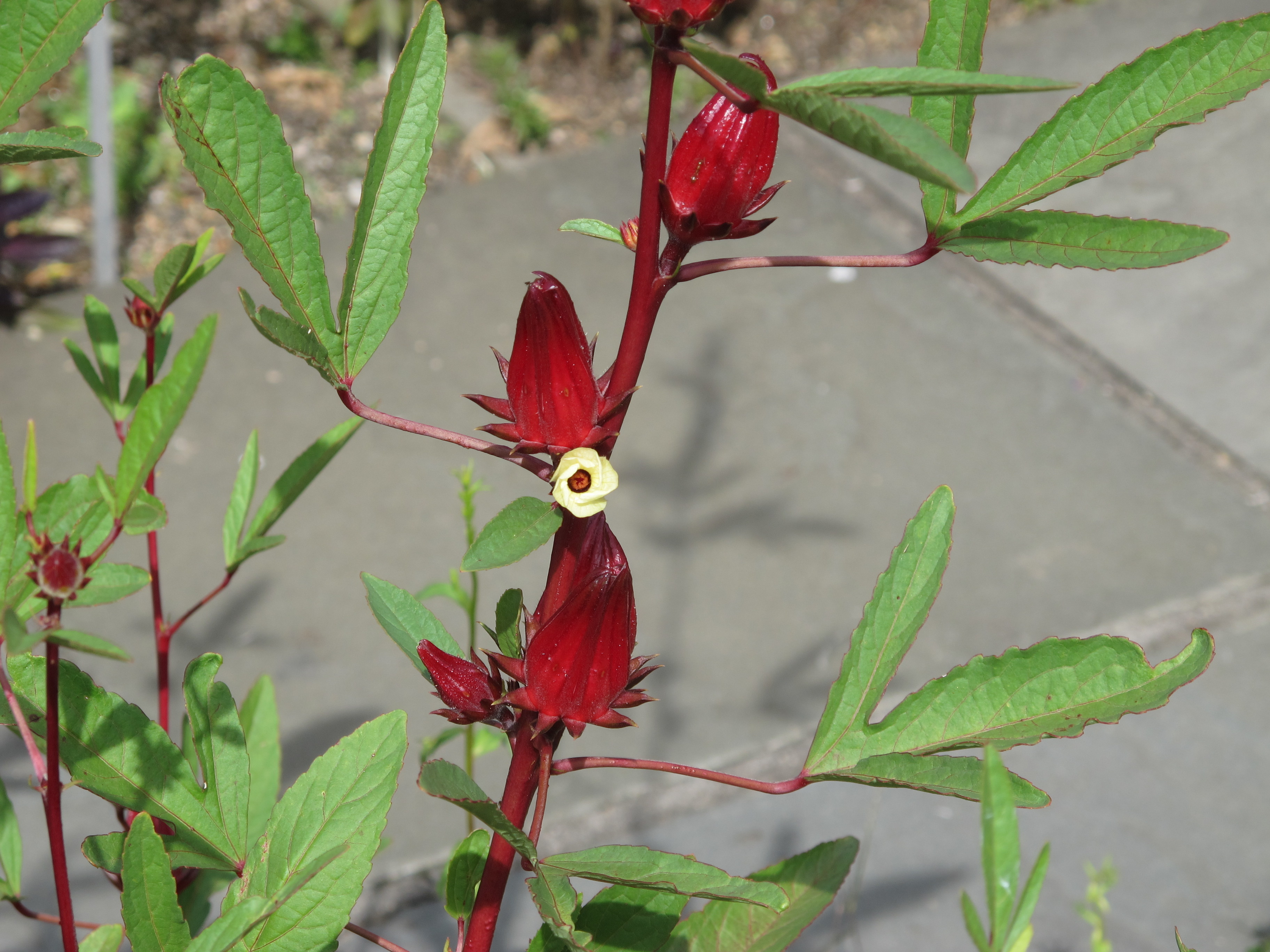
- In New York City

Scientific classification
- Kingdom: Plantae
- Clade: Tracheophytes
- Clade: Angiosperms
- Clade: Eudicots
- Clade: Rosids
- Order: Malvales
- Family: Malvaceae
- Subfamily: Malvoideae
- Tribe: Hibisceae
- Genus: Sabdariffa
- Species: S. gossypiifolia

Binomial name
- Sabdariffa gossypiifolia (Mill.) M.M.Hanes & R.L.Barrett

Synonyms
- List: Abelmoschus cruentus (Bertol.) Walp.; Furcaria sabdariffa Ulbr.; Hibiscus acetosus Noronha; Hibiscus cruentus Bertol.; Hibiscus cuneatus Bertol.; Hibiscus digitatus Cav.; Hibiscus digitatus var. kerrianus DC.; Hibiscus fraternus L.; Hibiscus gossypifolius Mill.; Hibiscus masuianus De Wild. & T.Durand; Hibiscus palmatilobus Baill.; Hibiscus sabdariffa L.; Hibiscus sanguineus Griff.; Hibiscus subdariffa Rottb., orth. var.; Sabdariffa digitata (Cav.) Kostel.; Sabdariffa rubra Kostel.

= Roselle (plant) =

Species of flowering plant

Roselle (Sabdariffa gossypiifolia) is a species of flowering plant in the family Malvaceae, likely native to parts of Africa. In the 16th and early 17th centuries it was spread to Asia and the West Indies, where it has since become naturalized in many places. The stems are used for the production of bast fiber and the calyces are commonly steeped to make an infusion popular in many places around the world.

== Description ==
Roselle is an annual or perennial herb or woody-based subshrub, growing to 2–2.5 m (7–8 ft) tall. The leaves are deeply three- to five-lobed, 8–15 cm (3–6 in) long, arranged alternately on the stems.

The flowers are 8–10 cm (3–4 in) in diameter, white to pale yellow with a dark red spot at the base of each petal, and have a stout, conspicuous calyx at the base, 1–2 cm (0.39–0.79 in) wide, enlarging to 3–3.5 cm (1.2–1.4 in) and becoming fleshy and a deep crimson red as the fruit matures, which takes about six months.

== Names ==
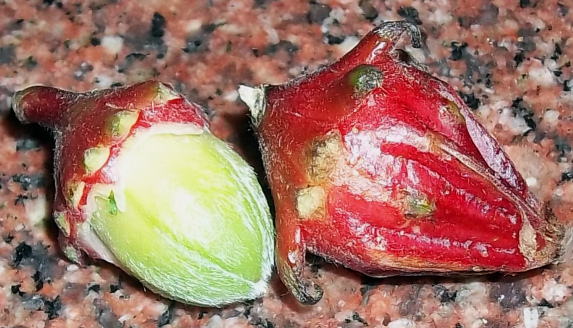
Capsule

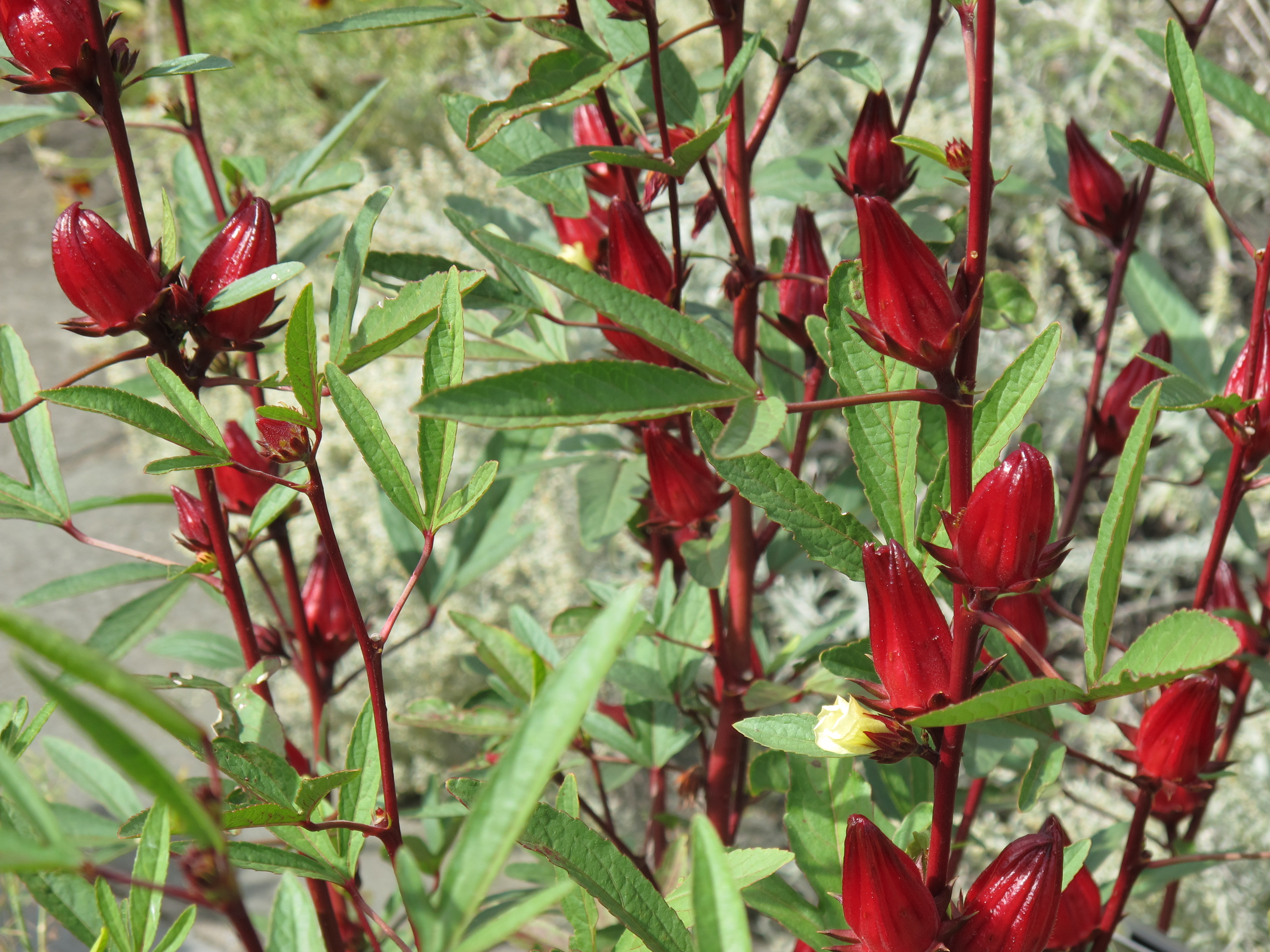
Wave Hill

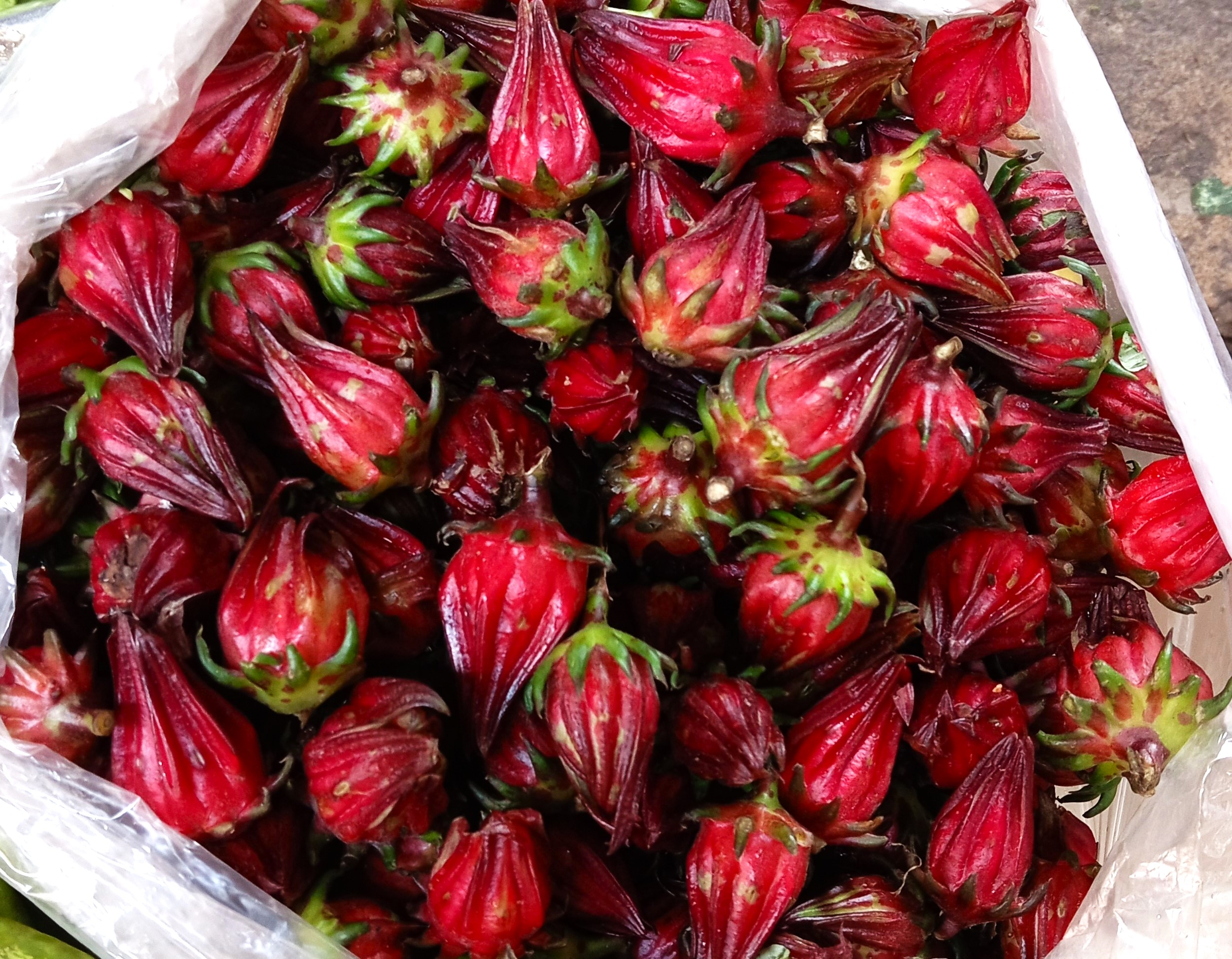
Roselle (Hibiscus sabdariffa) fruits, West Bengal, India

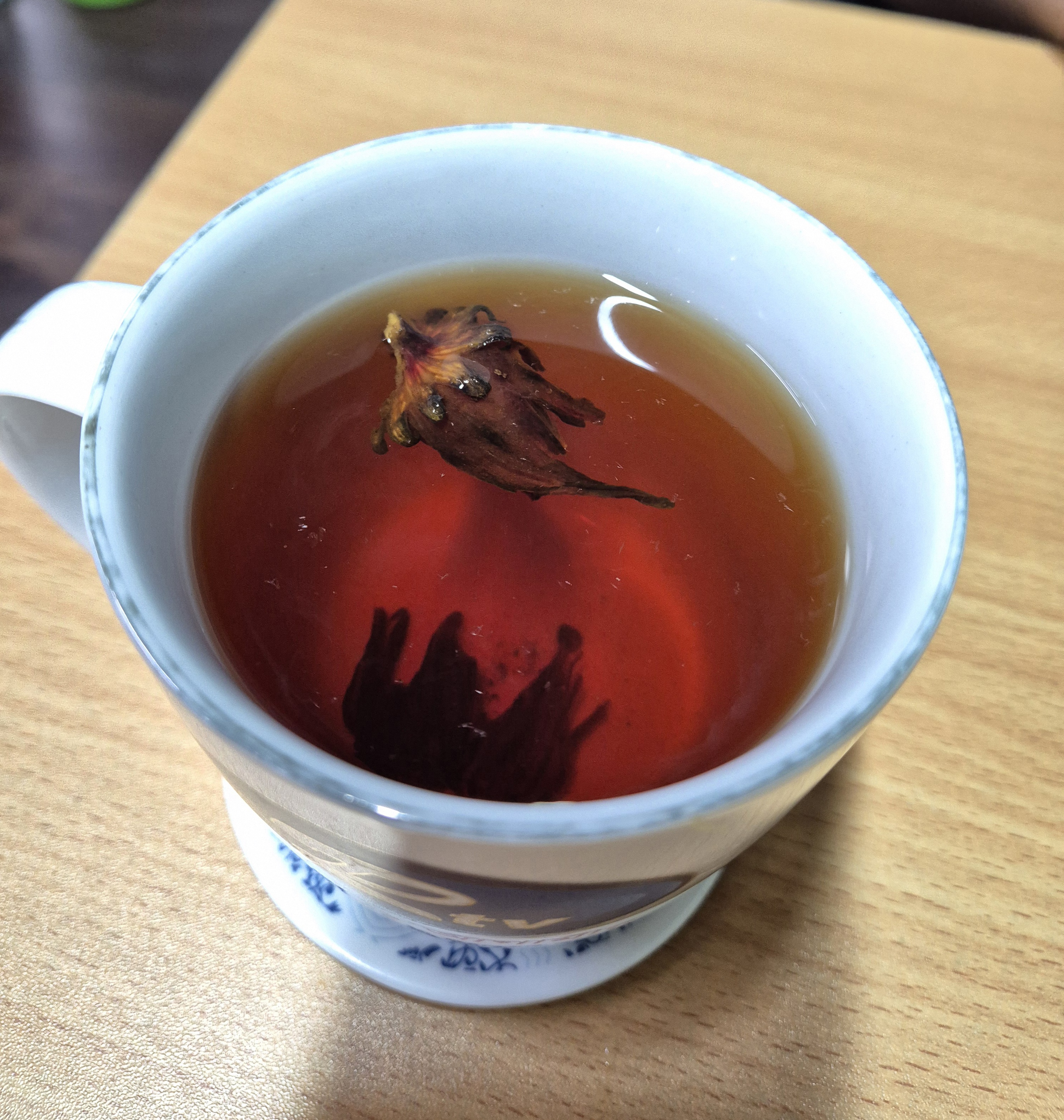
A cup of roselle flower tea on a desk, featuring a rich red color

In Australia, where it is naturalised, roselle is known as the rosella or rosella fruit, to distinguish it from rosella, a native bird. Roselle is also known as Florida Cranberry or Jamaica sorrel in the United States. It is known as sorrel in many parts of the English-speaking Caribbean.

== Composition ==
Roselle, raw
Nutritional value per 100 g (3.5 oz)
- Energy: 205 kJ (49 kcal)
- Carbohydrates: 11.31 g
- Fat: 0.64 g
- Protein: 0.96 g
Vitamins and minerals
Vitamins	Quantity %DV^{†}
Vitamin A equiv.	2% 14 μg
Thiamine (B1)	1% 0.011 mg
Riboflavin (B2)	2% 0.028 mg
Niacin (B3)	2% 0.31 mg
Vitamin C	13% 12 mg
Minerals	Quantity %DV^{†}
Calcium	17% 215 mg
Iron	8% 1.48 mg
Magnesium	12% 51 mg
Phosphorus	3% 37 mg
Potassium	7% 208 mg
Sodium	0% 6 mg
- Link to USDA Database entry
- ^{†}Percentages estimated using US recommendations for adults, except for potassium, which is estimated based on expert recommendation from the National Academies.

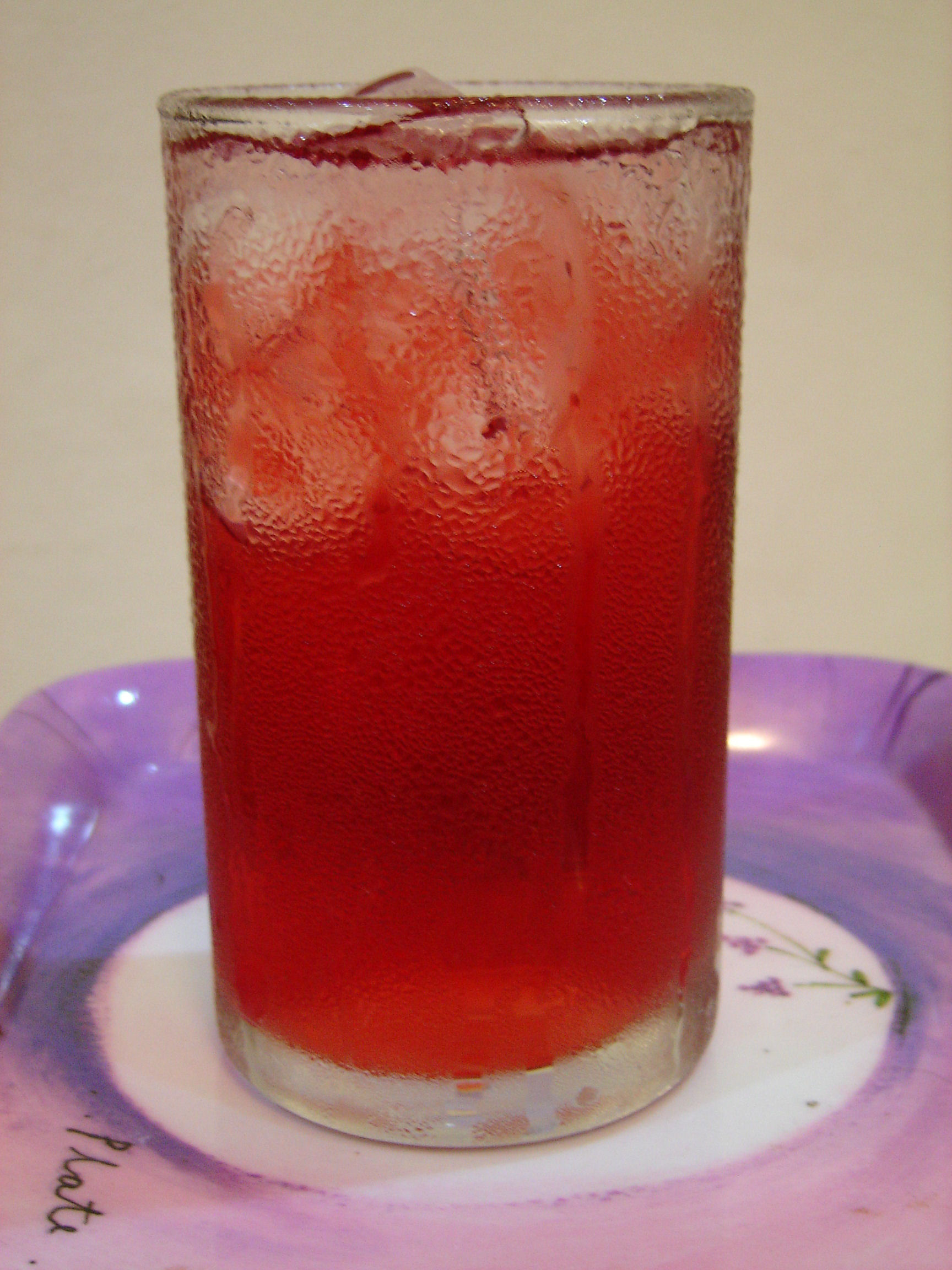
A roselle drink

=== Phytochemicals ===
The Hibiscus leaves are a good source of polyphenolic compounds. The major identified compounds include neochlorogenic acid, chlorogenic acid, cryptochlorogenic acid, caffeoylshikimic acid and flavonoid compounds such as quercetin, kaempferol and their derivatives. The flowers are rich in anthocyanins, as well as protocatechuic acid. The dried calyces contain the flavonoids gossypetin, hibiscetine and sabdaretine. The major pigment is not daphniphylline. Small amounts of myrtillin (delphinidin 3-monoglucoside), chrysanthenin (cyanidin 3-monoglucoside), and delphinidin are present. Roselle seeds are a good source of lipid-soluble antioxidants, particularly gamma-tocopherol.

== Uses ==
=== Culinary ===
Roselle is widely used in Burmese cuisine. The leaves are fried with garlic, dried or fresh prawns, and green chili or cooked with fish. A light soup made from roselle leaves and dried prawn stock is also a popular dish.

In the Philippines, the leaves and flowers are used to add sourness to tinola, a chicken soup.

In Vietnam, the young leaves, stems and fruits are used for cooking soups with fish or eel.

In Brazil, it is an important part of a dish regional to the state of Maranhão, Arroz de cuxá.

In Nigeria, roselle has multiple culinary uses, but is primarily consumed as a vegetable in soup.

==== Beverage ====
Roselle, often with additional fruit juice and spices, is used in Nigeria to make a sugary drink known as zobo.

In Sudan and Egypt, karkade (كركديه) is a popular drink made with dried roselle calyces.

In the Caribbean, a popular drink is made from roselle fruit and sugar. It is often additionally flavored with spices, such as bay leaves, cloves, and ginger.

Roselles are used to make a popular light beverage (agua fresca) in Mexico, Central America and Colombia; they are typically made from fresh fruits, juices or extracts.

Beverages made from the roselle fruit are included in a category of red drinks associated with West Africa consumed by African Americans. Such red drinks, now usually carbonated soft drinks, are commonly served in soul food restaurants and at African-American social events, including Juneteenth, a celebration of the emancipation of slaves.

In Thailand, roselle is generally drunk as a cool drink.

==== Preserves ====
Roselle fruits contain enough pectin that they can be made into jam without adding more pectin from another source.

=== Medical ===
==== Herbal medicine (high blood pressure) ====
A 2021 meta-analysis conducted by the Cochrane hypertension group concluded that currently the evidence is insufficient to establish if roselle, when compared to placebo, is effective in managing or lowering blood pressure in people with hypertension. An older meta-survey (2015) in the Journal of Hypertension suggests a typical reduction in blood pressure of around 7.5/3.5 units (systolic/diastolic). Both cite the need for additional well designed studies.

In a controlled laboratory experiment, an extract of Hibiscus sabdariffa calyxes was shown to reduce both systolic and diastolic blood pressures in Wistar rats over a 4 week trial period.

=== Fiber ===
The plant is cultivated for its bast fiber, which is used to make cordage and as a substitute for jute in making burlap.

=== Colorant ===
Roselle can be a natural source of water-soluble red food dye.

== Production ==
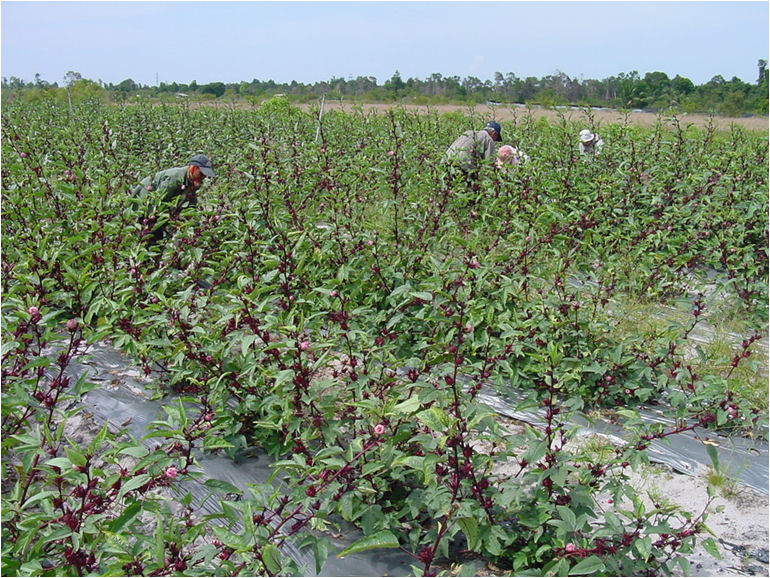
Harvesting roselle planted on bris (sandy) soils in Rhu Tapai, Terengganu, Malaysia (September 2002)

China and Thailand are the largest producers and control much of the world supply. Many tropical countries are both significant producers of roselle, including Sudan, Nigeria, Mexico, Egypt, Senegal, Tanzania, Mali and Jamaica, although much of this production goes towards satisfying domestic demand.

Roselle is a relatively new crop to create an industry in Malaysia. It was introduced in the early 1990s and its commercial planting was first promoted in 1993 by the Department of Agriculture in Terengganu. The planted acreage was 12.8 ha (30 acres) in 1993 and steadily increased to peak at 506 ha (1,000 acres) by 2000. The planted area is now less than 150 ha (400 acres) annually, planted with two main varieties. Terengganu state used to be the first and the largest producer, but now the production has spread more to other states.

== Cultivation ==
In the initial years, limited research work was conducted by University Malaya and Malaysian Agricultural Research and Development Institute (MARDI). Research work at Universiti Kebangsaan Malaysia (UKM) was initiated in 1999.

=== Crop genetic resources and improvement ===
Genetic variation is important for plant breeders to increase crop productivity. Being an introduced species in Malaysia, there is a very limited number of germplasm accessions available for breeding.

UKM maintains a working germplasm collection and conducts agronomic research and crop improvement.

=== Mutation breeding ===
Conventional hybridization is difficult to carry out in roselle due to its cleistogamous nature of reproduction. Because of this, a mutation breeding programme was initiated to generate new genetic variability. The use of induced mutations for its improvement was initiated in 1999 in cooperation with MINT (now called Malaysian Nuclear Agency) and has produced some promising breeding lines. Roselle is a tetraploid species; thus, segregating populations require longer time to achieve fixation as compared to diploid species. In April 2009, UKM launched three new varieties named UKMR-1, UKMR-2 and UKMR-3. These new varieties were developed using Arab as the parent variety in a mutation breeding programme which started in 2006.

=== Natural outcrossing under local conditions ===
A study was conducted to estimate the amount of outcrossing under local conditions in Malaysia. It was found that outcrossing occurred at a very low rate of about 0.02%. However, this rate is much lower in comparison to estimates of natural cross-pollination of between 0.20% and 0.68% as reported in Jamaica.

== See also ==
- Gongura - a variety, used as food in India

== Gallery ==
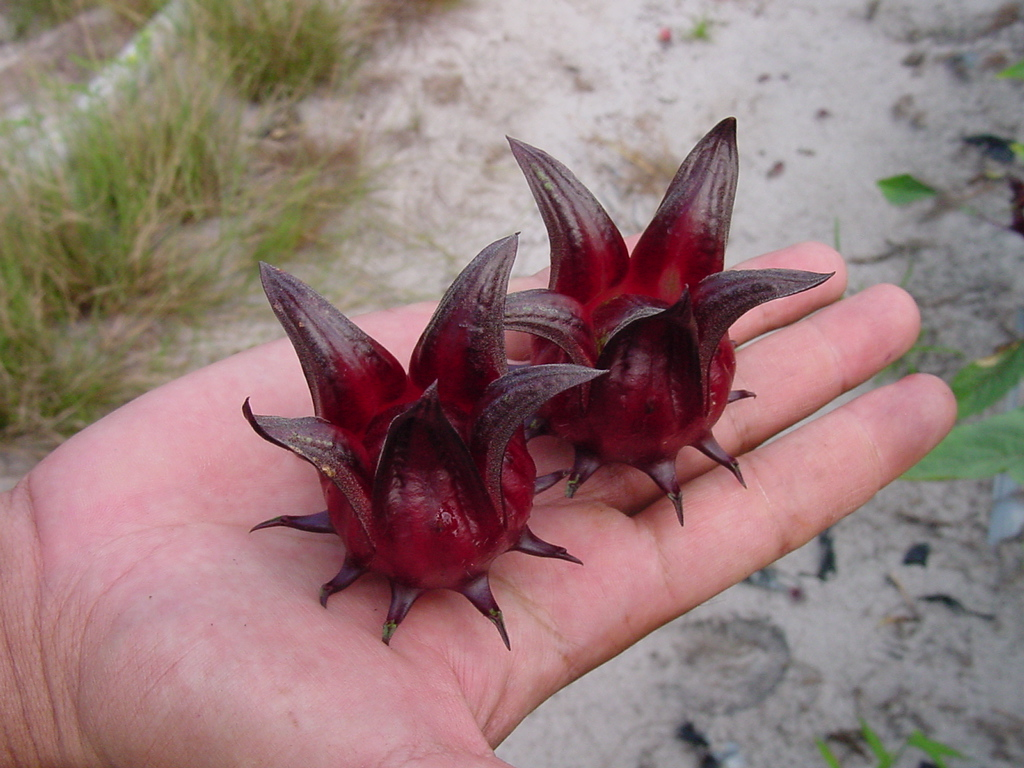
A popular roselle variety planted in Malaysia: Terengganu. Roselle fruits are harvested fresh, and their calyces are made into a drink rich in vitamin C and anthocyanins.

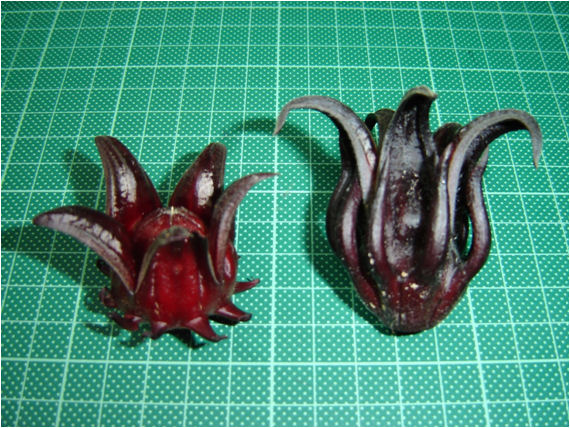
Two varieties are planted in Malaysia — left Terengganu or UMKL-1, right Arab. The varieties produce about 8 t/ha (3.6 short tons/acre) of fresh fruits or 4 t/ha (1.8 short tons/acre) of fresh calyces. On the average, variety Arab yields more and has a higher calyx to capsule ratio.

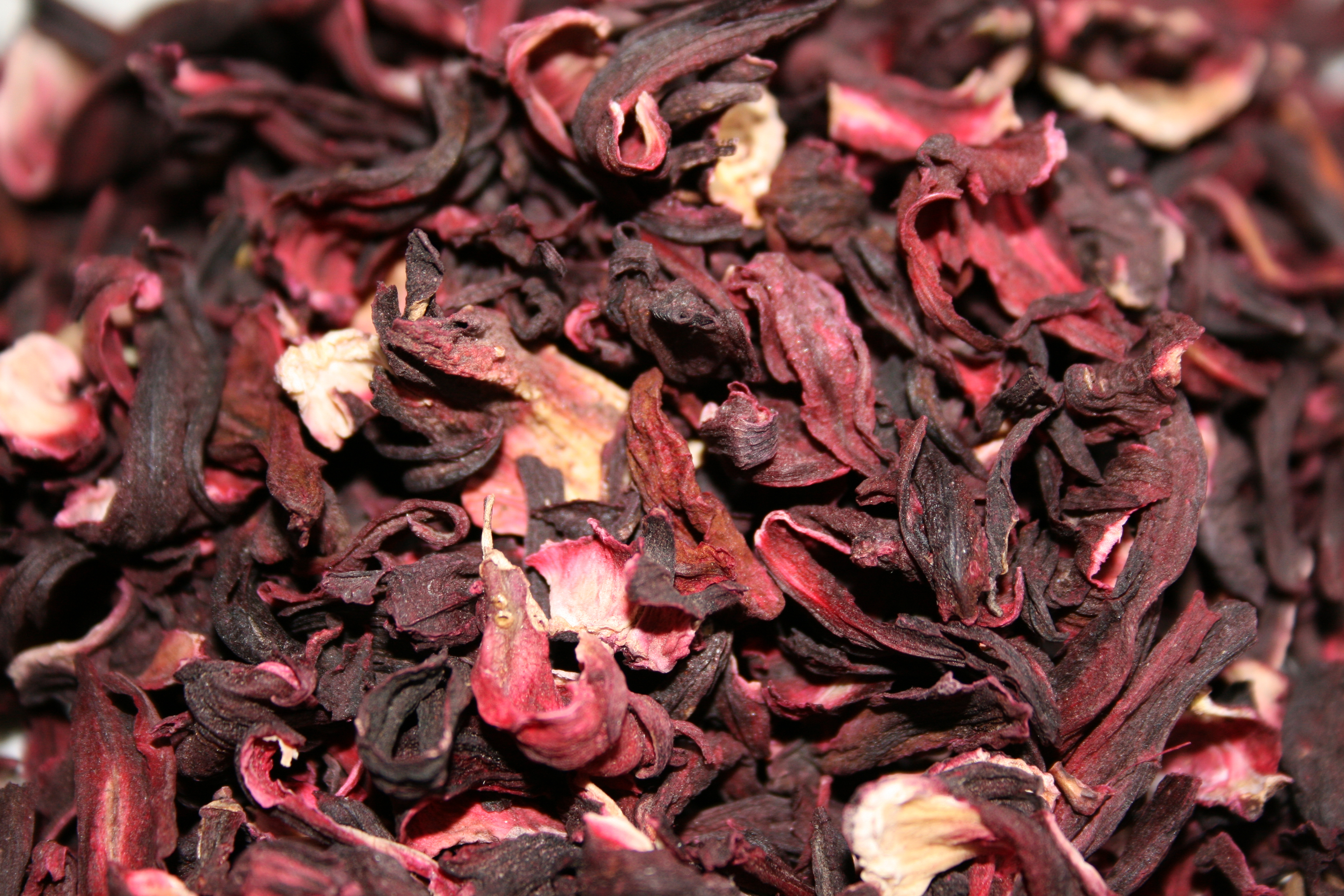
Dried roselle calyces can be obtained in two ways. One way is to harvest the fruits fresh, decore them, and then dry the calyces; the other is to leave the fruits to dry on the plants to some extent, harvest the dried fruits, dry them further if necessary, and then separate the calyces from the capsules

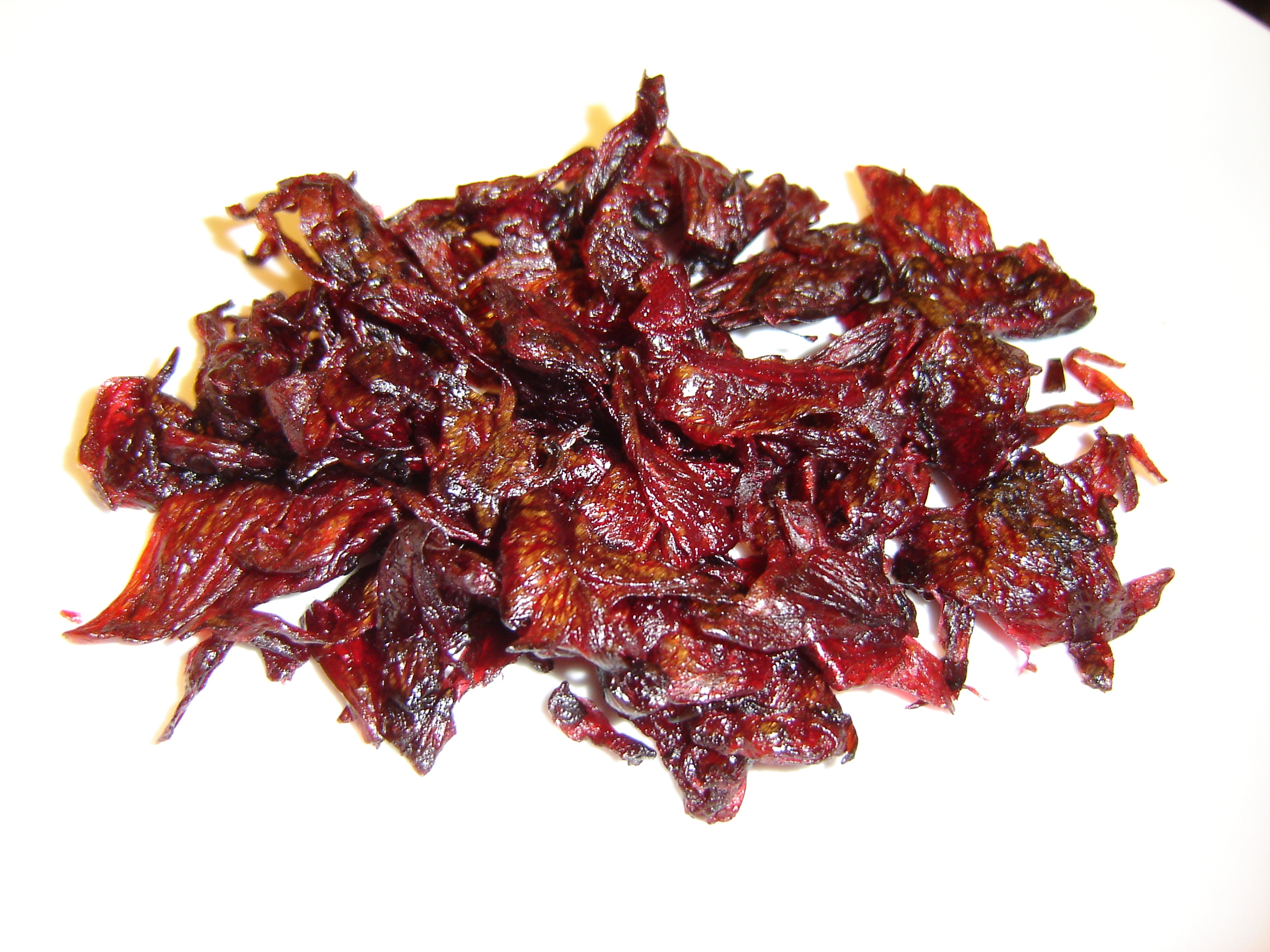
Roselle calyces can be processed into sweet pickle. This is usually produced as a by-product of juice production. However, quality sweet pickle may require a special production process.

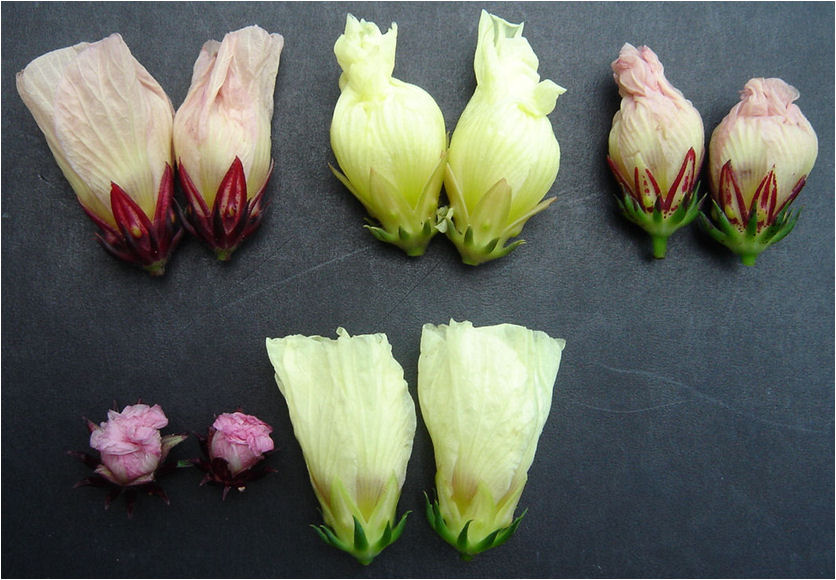
Variation in flower colour of roselle (a tetraploid species)

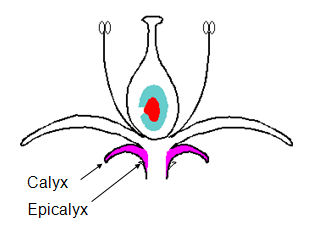
Calyx (a collective term for sepals of a flower); Epicalyx (a collective term for structures found on, below, or close to the true calyx, also called false calyx). Some varieties show pronounced epicalyx structures, such as found in variety Arab (plural calyces).

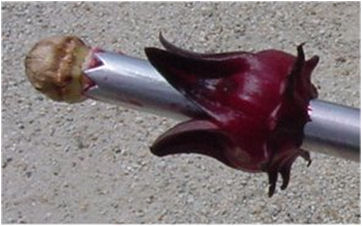
Decoring — removal of a seed capsule from the fruit using a simple hand-held gadget to obtain its calyx

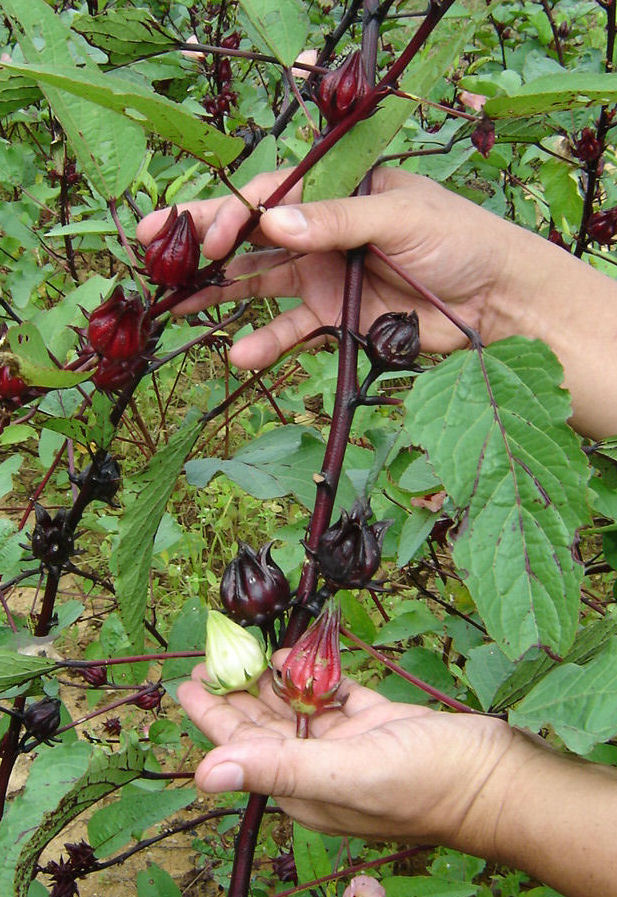
Some breeding lines developed from the mutation breeding programme at UKM.
