= The One (fragrance) =

Fragrance line by Dolce & Gabbana

Fragrance by Dolce & Gabbana
- Designed for: Women
- Released: 2006
- Label: Dolce & Gabbana
- Concentration: Eau de parfum

The One for Men

Fragrance by Dolce & Gabbana
- Designed for: Men
- Released: 2008
- Label: Dolce & Gabbana
- Perfumer(s): Olivier Polge

L'Eau The One

Fragrance by Dolce & Gabbana
- Designed for: Women
- Released: 2008
- Label: Dolce & Gabbana

Rose The One

Fragrance by Dolce & Gabbana
- Designed for: Women
- Released: 2009
- Label: Dolce & Gabbana

The One Desire

Fragrance by Dolce & Gabbana
- Designed for: Women
- Released: 2013
- Label: Dolce & Gabbana

The One Essence

Fragrance by Dolce & Gabbana
- Designed for: Women
- Released: 2015
- Label: Dolce & Gabbana

The One Eau de Toilette

Fragrance by Dolce & Gabbana
- Designed for: Women
- Released: 2017
- Label: Dolce & Gabbana
- Perfumer(s): Michel Girard
- Concentration: Eau de toilette

The One Royal Night

Fragrance by Dolce & Gabbana
- Designed for: Men
- Label: Dolce & Gabbana
- Perfumer(s): Jean-Christophe Hérault

The One is a line of fragrances by the Italian fashion house Dolce & Gabbana. The original women's eau de parfum was launched in 2006 as the first fragrance produced under the brand's licence with Procter & Gamble, and a men's counterpart, The One for Men, followed in 2008. The line has since grown to include several flankers and new concentrations.

The One is known for its advertising campaigns, which have featured Gisele Bündchen, Matthew McConaughey, Scarlett Johansson, Emilia Clarke, Kit Harington and Madonna, with short films directed by Martin Scorsese and Matteo Garrone.

== History ==
=== Launch ===
Dolce & Gabbana signed a fragrance licence with Procter & Gamble Prestige Products in December 2005, which took effect in July 2006. The One was the first scent developed under the new agreement. In an interview with Women's Wear Daily, Stefano Gabbana described it as unlike the brand's earlier fragrances: it was the house's first fruity scent, and only its second, after Light Blue, that was not tied to a particular season. The company intended it to be a more aspirational signature fragrance while still selling in high volume. The perfume was composed by Christine Nagel.

=== The One for Men ===
The One for Men was released in 2008. It was created by perfumer Olivier Polge, and its notes include grapefruit, coriander, basil, cardamom, ginger, orange blossom, cedar, tobacco and ambergris.

=== Later releases ===
Flankers to the women's fragrance include L'Eau The One (2008), Rose The One (2009), The One Desire (2013) and The One Essence (2015). In 2017 the brand released The One Eau de Toilette for women, created by Michel Girard, together with a redesigned, slimmer bottle with a geometric gold cap. The men's line at that time also included The One Royal Night, created by Jean-Christophe Hérault.

In January 2026, Dolce&Gabbana Beauty marked the line's 20th anniversary by introducing two new fragrances under The One name.

=== Licensing ===
Dolce & Gabbana's fragrance licence was expected to transfer to Coty as part of its acquisition of Procter & Gamble's beauty brands, but the transfer did not go ahead. Shiseido became the licence holder for the brand's fragrances, make-up and skin care from 1 October 2016. Shiseido and Dolce & Gabbana partially ended the agreement at the end of 2021, and Dolce & Gabbana set up its own beauty company, Dolce&Gabbana Beauty, based in Milan, to manage the business in-house. By 2026, fragrances made up the large majority of that company's sales.

== Composition ==
The women's eau de parfum is a floral fragrance with top notes of bergamot, mandarin, lychee and peach, a heart of Madonna lily, and a base of vanilla, amber and musk. The 2017 eau de toilette is a lighter floral and citrus interpretation built around white lily, bergamot and mandarin.

The One for Men is a spicy, woody fragrance.

== Advertising ==
Gisele Bündchen was the face of the original 2006 campaign. Its television commercial showed her preparing backstage at a fashion show while photographers crowded around her. Matthew McConaughey fronted the campaign for The One for Men from its 2008 launch, and Scarlett Johansson later became the face of the women's line.

In November 2013, Dolce & Gabbana released Street of Dreams, a short black-and-white film directed by Martin Scorsese and starring Johansson and McConaughey. It was the first campaign to bring together the faces of the women's and men's fragrances. Inspired by classic Italian cinema, the film follows the two as former lovers driving through New York City in a vintage Alfa Romeo convertible and talking about love and fame.

In March 2017, Emilia Clarke and Kit Harington, both known for the television series Game of Thrones, were announced as the new faces of the women's and men's fragrances. Their separate commercials, directed by Matteo Garrone, were filmed in the streets and outdoor markets of Naples and released in September 2017.

For the line's 20th anniversary in 2026, Madonna and actor Alberto Guerra starred in a new campaign photographed by Mert Alaş. The commercial, inspired by 1970s Italian neorealist cinema, is set to Madonna's Italian-language cover of "La bambola", originally recorded by Patty Pravo.

== See also ==
- Light Blue (fragrance)
- Dolce&Gabbana Beauty
