= Diet Prada =

Fashion watchdog group

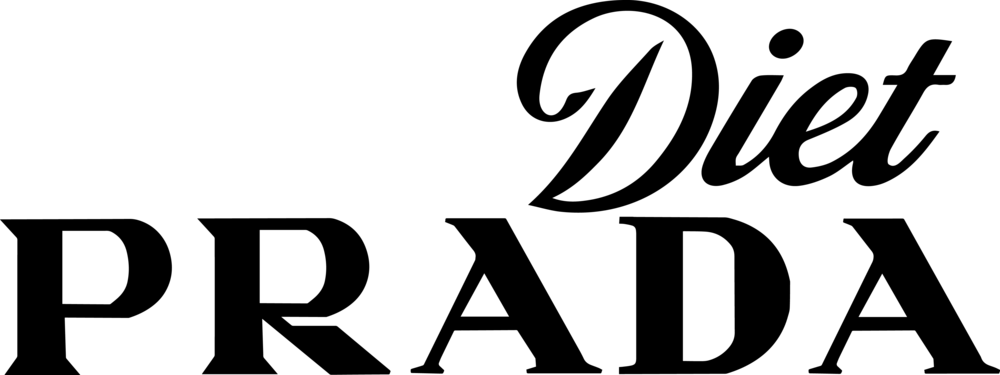
- Formation: 2014; 12 years ago
- Purpose: Fashion commentary
- Key people: Tony Liu and Lindsey Schuyler
- Website: dietprada.com

Diet Prada is an Instagram account that reports and commentates on fashion. Created in 2014 by two then-anonymous founders, the account's owners were identified in 2017 as fashion industry professionals Tony Liu and Lindsey Schuyler. Originally created as a lighthearted way to call out similarities in designs, beginning in 2018 the account became a more serious voice in campaigning for integrity and accountability within the fashion industry. In addition to highlighting copied designs, Diet Prada has drawn attention to cultural appropriation and lack of diversity in publishing and fashion companies. As of March 2022, the account had more than three million followers.

== History ==
=== 2018 Dolce & Gabbana fashion show ===
In November 2018, the account drew attention to a Dolce & Gabbana video advertisement promoting their major upcoming fashion show, called "The Great Show," that was scheduled to occur in Shanghai. Featuring a Chinese model struggling to eat Italian foods with a pair of chopsticks, the advertisement was criticized as racist. Several hours before The Great Show was scheduled to begin, Diet Prada shared screenshots of direct messages alleged to be from Stefano Gabbana, in which he appeared to denigrate China and Chinese people. The post quickly went viral in China and the hashtag #boycottdolce began to trend. Hundreds of Chinese individuals scheduled to appear in the show withdrew, and the show was eventually canceled. Apologies were later posted to the Dolce & Gabbana account, and claims were made that both Gabbana's personal Instagram account and the brand account had been hacked. Diet Prada later described the incident in an interview with Fast Company as a moment when they realized they had the ability to effect major change within the fashion industry.

== Founders ==
Tony Liu and Lindsey Schuyler met when they worked together at the American accessories line Eugenia Kim. By 2015, they had both left the brand but they kept in touch. The two would browse photographs of runway shows, noticing similarities between the pieces and older designs, and created their Diet Prada Instagram account in 2014 "just for fun". They remained anonymous for the first three years of the account's existence, eventually revealing their identities in an October 2017 feature in The Fashion Law.

=== Tony Liu ===
Liu was born in New York City and earned a fine arts degree from the School of the Art Institute of Chicago. As of October 2017 he ran a menswear brand called YOU AS. In 2016, YOU AS was listed by Highsnobiety as an "upcoming" brand. YOU AS launched a Spring 2018 collection. Vogue described Liu's motivations behind the collection as his own take on "the seedy cool of Las Vegas, à la Tom Wolfe and Hunter S. Thompson, without falling victim to its cheesy ick factor".

=== Lindsey Schuyler ===
Schuyler grew up in Saint Augustine, Florida and was a designer for the eyewear company FGXI. She owns and runs a consulting practice.

== Monetization ==
Diet Prada earns much of its revenue through sales of merchandise. They also partner with brands and institutions such as museums who want them to cover fashion exhibits. They have done takeovers of Instagram accounts of other brands, such as Gucci.

== Reaction ==
The Business of Fashion described Diet Prada in May 2018 as "the most feared Instagram account" for the repercussions that have been faced by brands it has criticized. Fast Company described Diet Prada in May 2019 as "one of the most influential voices in the fashion industry right now."

GQ wrote an article about them where they gave a platform to their readers, writing that some believe that "we've moved past Diet Prada because no one holds Diet Prada accountable".

Diet Prada has been criticized for allegedly giving preferential treatment to brands with whom it has collaborated. Some brands and individuals who have been criticized by Diet Prada have described receiving angry and sometimes threatening comments from the account's followers for long periods of time. Diet Prada has been described as an example of "cancel culture."
