= Sohee Park =

South Korean fashion designer (born 1996)

- Born: Park Sohee; April 29, 1996 (age 30); Seoul, South Korea
- Other name: Lee
- Education: Central Saint Martins (2020)
- Occupation: Fashion designer
- Years active: 2020–present
- Known for: Miss Sohee
- Website: missohee.com

Sohee Park (Korean: 박소희; born April 29, 1996) is a South Korean womenswear designer based in London, United Kingdom. She is known for her clothing label Miss Sohee, which specializes in couture.

== Early life and education ==
Park was born and raised in Seoul, South Korea. Her mother is a successful writer and illustrator of children's books in South Korea and her father is a professor. Park's grandmother, who loved embroidering herself, inspired her fascination with intricate design. Despite initial hesitation, her parents supported her move to London to pursue fashion.

While studying fashion at the Central Saint Martins in London, Park interned under designers such as Marc Jacobs and Molly Goddard. She graduated from Central Saint Martins in 2020 and eventually launched her label, Miss Sohee.

== Career ==
Park launched her debut collection, "The Girl in Full Bloom," under her label Miss Sohee in 2020. Due to the COVID-19 pandemic, there was no final year show to present the collection. Instead, Park released a series of photographs of her floral-style pieces on Instagram, which went viral. Looks from her graduate collection were featured on the cover of LOVE magazine, and Christian Cowan asked her to collaborate with him for his Spring 2021 collection.

Since her debut, her designs have appeared on the likes of several notable celebrities, including Miley Cyrus, Cardi B, Bella Hadid, Ariana Grande, Priyanka Chopra, Gemma Chan, Naomi Campbell, Gigi Hadid, Julia Fox, and Christina Aguilera.

Sohee Park then made her fashion week debut in February 2022 at the Milan Fashion Week with the support of Domenico Dolce and Stefano Gabbana of Dolce & Gabbana. Later in 2022, Park's Peony gown from the "Girl in Full Bloom" collection was exhibited for the Hallyu! The Korean Wave Exhibition at the Victoria and Albert Museum.

Park's Paris Fashion Week debut came the following year in January 2023 in the Paris Westin-Vendôme. Her work from this collection continued to be spotlighted in many notable fashion editorials, including Vogue Brazil and Elle (magazine) featuring Imaan Hammam.

== Appearances ==
Park's designs were seen on many notable red carpets, such as the Met Gala, The amfAR gala, VMAs, AMAs, and the Vanity Fair Oscars Party.

Miley Cyrus wore a Miss Sohee peony gown to backdrop her performance at the Graham Norton Show.

The Eternals actress Gemma Chan wore black separates teamed with a matching headpiece by Sohee Park for her Red Carpet look at the Rome Film Festival in 2021.

Rita Ora wore an embellished gown from Miss Sohee's fall 2022 collection for the Oscars after-party in 2022.

American model and former Victoria's Secret angel Taylor Marie Hill attended the 2022 Met Gala wearing Miss Sohee's blue satin off-the-shoulder gown with long sleeves. American actress Chloe Fineman also wore Park's design for the event.

Priyanka Chopra attended The Bulgari Mediterranea High Jewelry event in Venice wearing deep red two-piece assemble from Miss Sohee's spring/summer SS23 couture collection.

== Awards ==
In June 2023, Park became the third winner of the Goodwood Talent in Fashion Award, chosen by Goodwood Festival of Speed in collaboration with the British Fashion Council.
