= Dolce & Gabbana =

Italian fashion house

Coordinates: 45°28′09″N 09°12′34″E

Dolce & Gabbana S.r.l.

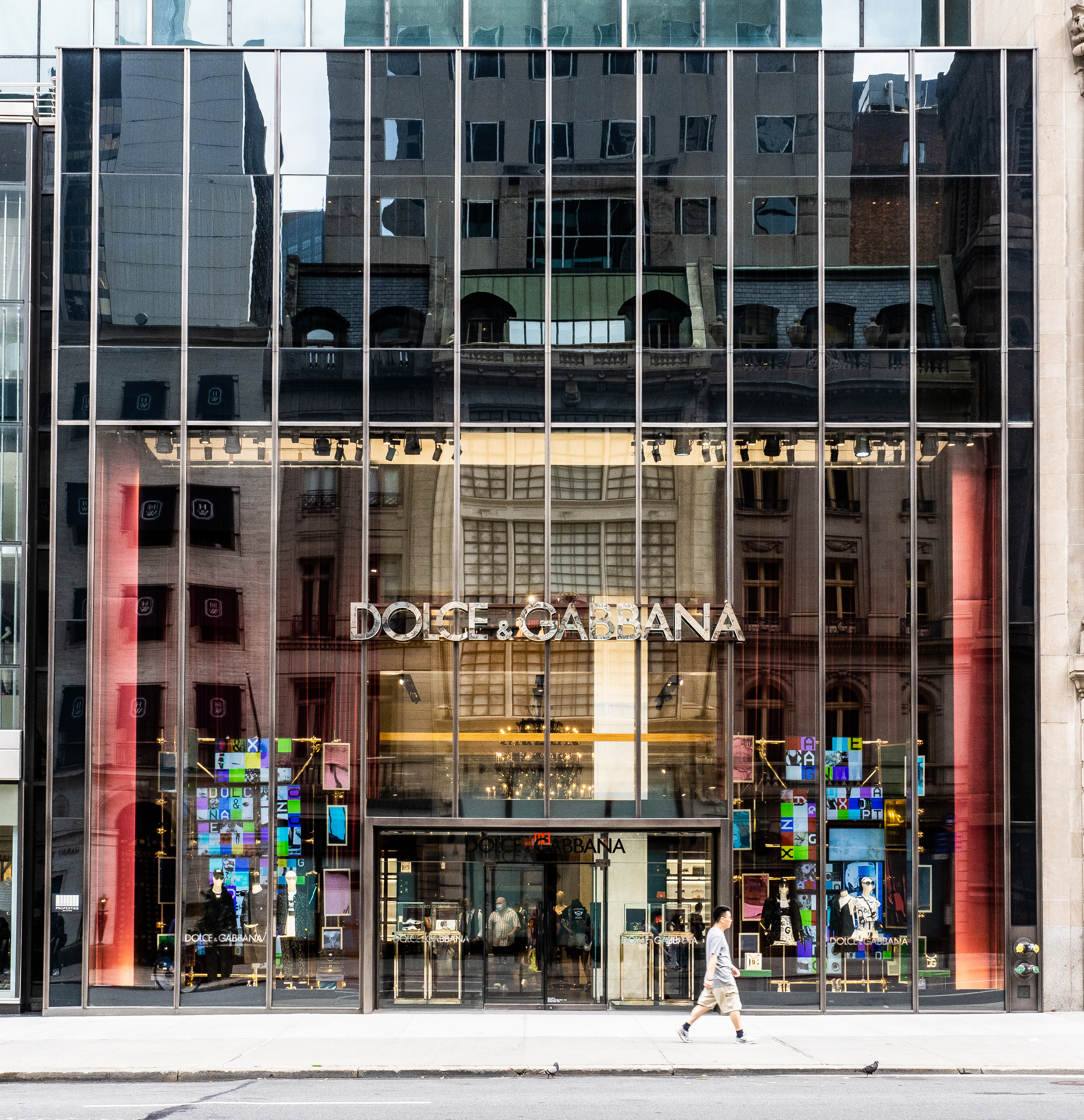
- Location on Fifth Avenue, Manhattan
- Type: Società a responsabilità limitata
- Industry: Fashion; Design; Beauty; Real Estate
- Founded: 1985; 41 years ago Legnano, Italy
- Founders: Domenico Dolce; Stefano Gabbana
- Headquarters: Milan, Italy
- Area served: Worldwide
- Key people: Alfonso Dolce, CEO; Stefano Cantino (Co-CEO)
- Products: Fashion - RTW and accessories; Watches and Jewelry; Design; Beauty - fragrance and make-up; Food and Beverage
- Revenue: €1.5 billion (2021)
- Net income: €60.5 million
- Number of employees: 3150 (2021)
- Website: dolcegabbana.com

Dolce & Gabbana (Italian pronunciation: [ˈdoltʃe e‿ɡɡabˈbaːna]), also known by initials D&G, is an Italian fashion house founded in 1985 in Legnano by Italian designers Domenico Dolce and Stefano Gabbana. Stefano Gabbana stepped down as chair in December 2025, a decision announced in April 2026, while remaining co-creative director alongside Domenico Dolce. The house specializes in ready-to-wear, haute couture, handbags, accessories, cosmetics, and fragrances and licenses its name and branding to Luxottica for eyewear.

== History ==
=== Early history ===
Dolce&Gabbana founders Domenico Dolce and Stefano Gabbana met each other in 1982 while working for Giorgio Correggiari, an Italian fashion brand. Domenico Dolce was born on 13 August 1958, in Polizzi Generosa, while Stefano Gabbana was born on 14 November 1962, in Milan. Dolce began designing and making his clothes at the age of six.

=== 1980s ===
In 1983, Dolce and Gabbana established their own design consulting studio, which they named "Dolce & Gabbana". Their first women's collection debuted in 1985 at the New Talents section of Milan Fashion Week, and the following year, they opened their first store in Milan. The first meeting between the two happened over the phone when Dolce called the fashion company where Gabbana was working, looking for a job. After being hired by the company, Gabbana took Dolce under his wing and taught him the workings of a fashion company and how to sketch new designs. Shortly after Dolce's hiring, Gabbana was drafted for 18 months of civil service at an institution for the mentally ill, but after his return, the two created a design consulting business.

The company's 1986 Spring and Summer (SS) collection, titled Geometrissimo was presented alongside other fashion labels. Dolce & Gabbana did not have enough money to hire models or provide them with accessories, so they sought help from their friends. Their friends served as models and wore their personal items to accessorize the clothing. A bed sheet from Dolce's home was used as their stage curtain.

In March 1986, Dolce & Gabbana released their first self-produced collection, Donne Vere/Real Women, for the Fall and Winter (FW) 1986/87 season. The name of the collection was influenced by the local women who served as models on the runway. However, sales were initially disappointing, and Gabbana canceled the fabric order for their second collection. Later, during a visit to Sicily over Christmas, Dolce's family helped cover some of the costs. Incidentally, the fabric company did not receive the cancellation notice in time, and the fabric was ready for them when they returned to Milan. In September 1986, Dolce&Gabbana presented the SS 1987 Women's fashion show entitled Trasformismo. Despite working together, they always invoiced separately until an accountant advised them to invoice jointly to simplify things and make the business more cost-effective. The two began invoicing clients under the name Dolce and Gabbana, which became the name of their developing design business. They produced their next collection in 1986 and opened their first store the same year.

In 1987, Dolce & Gabbana presented the Women's Spring/Summer 1988 collection, titled Il Gattopardo/The Leopard. The next year they began designing underwear and swimwear, and by 1990 the company was exporting to Japan and the United States. In the same year, they launched their first perfume, Dolce&Gabbana Pour Homme and Dolce&Gabbana Pour Femme, produced and distributed by Euroitalia.

Dolce & Gabbana's fourth collection, influenced by Dolce's Sicilian roots, drew attention in the Italian fashion press. The collection's advertising campaign was shot in Sicily by photographer Ferdinando Scianna and included Dutch model Marpessa Hennink in black and white photographs reminiscent of 1940s Italian cinema. The brand's use of Italian cinema as a theme continued in their fifth collection, which drew upon the work of filmmaker Luchino Visconti and his film The Leopard.

Author and journalist Hal Rubenstein described one design, the so-called "Sicilian Dress" from their fourth collection, as "iconic" and the epitome of Dolce & Gabbana's style, due to its slip-like silhouette.

In 2012, Hal Rubenstein described this work as follows: "The Sicilian Dress is the essence of Dolce & Gabbana, the sartorial cornerstone of the brand. The dress takes inspiration from a slip, but it is a slip that adorned Anna Magnani, and it is a silhouette that graced Anita Ekberg, Sophia Loren, and so on. The straps fit tightly to the body just like those of a bra; the neckline runs straight but is pinned at least twice, once on each side, to caress the two breasts and in the middle to meet an uplifting fold that provides slight support. The slip does not simply fall down but rises at the waist to hold the figure firmly but not too tightly, and then flares out to emphasize the hips, falling slightly tapered at the knees, ensuring the swaying of the hips while walking."

In 1987, Dolce & Gabbana launched their first knitwear collection line, and in 1989, they started an underwear and beachwear collection. In the same year, they launched their first women's fashion show in Tokyo and opened their first store in Japan together with Kashiyama Co.

=== 1990s ===
In 1990, the company opened its first women's boutique in Via Sant'Andrea, Milan. Michael Gross wrote of their third collection in a 1992 interview, "They were a secret known only to a handful of Italian fashion editors. Their few models changed behind a rickety screen. They called their collection of T-shirt-cotton and elastic-silk pieces, Transformation." The clothing in this collection came with instructions on the seven different ways a piece could be worn in an outfit, as the wearer could use Velcro and snaps to alter the clothing's form.

In April 1990, they held their first fashion show in New York, started exporting their products to the United States, and founded their own showroom. That same year, Dolce&Gabbana presented the first Men's FW 1990/1991 collection. The collection consisted of linear-cut garments in dark, solid colors such as black, gray and burgundy. The common thread of the collection was the high-waisted trousers, combined with shirts, wool sweaters and blazers. The brand also moved the design house into its first official offices. The company also began to design gowns and other more expensive pieces in addition to their original clothing.

The designers' 1990 Spring/Summer women's collection was presented at the Gli Anni '60 fashion show and referenced the mythological painting of Raphael, while the duo began to build a reputation for crystal-encrusted clothing. The 1991 Fall/Winter women's collection was also adorned by trinkets, including filigree medals and embellished corsets. The 1992 Fall/Winter women's collection was then inspired by the silver screen of the 1950s, though the collection still included crystal embellished body suits.

In 1991, their men's collection won the Woolmark Award for the most innovative men's collection of the year. Madonna wore a corset made of gemstones and an accompanying jacket from Dolce & Gabbana at the 1991 New York City premiere of Truth or Dare: In Bed with Madonna, which was among the brand's earliest presentations outside Italy. In 1993, the duo collaborated with Madonna to design over 1,500 costumes for her Girlie Show international tour in support of the album Erotica. In 1994, the house's trademark double-breasted jacket was named "La Turlington" after model Christy Turlington. That same year the company launched the D&G brand, a line produced and distributed by Ittierre, aimed at younger individuals.

In 1993, Dolce & Gabbana Pour Femme was awarded the Perfume Academy's 1993 award for best feminine fragrance of the year.

They won an "Oscar des Parfums" for best male perfume in 1996 from the French Parfum Academy, the first time ever that the title has been awarded to an Italian brand. Towards the end of the 1990s their sales were around $500 million and in 2003 alone, their revenue reached $633.2 million.

In 1995, the brand presented the SS 1996 women's fashion show, Le Eolie, which included garments with leopard and zebra prints. That same year, Dolce & Gabbana's collections drew criticism from the British and Italian press for incorporating an American gangster theme as a design motif. The brand transposed this Fall/Winter 1995 inspiration onto women's wear, which critics stated brought an erotic edge to the clothing. The duo had used the motif before in 1992 when photographer Steven Meisel shot an ad campaign for the house in which the models posed in "gangster chic". This included wide-lapelled 1930s style coats and black leather caps.

In 1996 the D&G runway show was streamed on the Internet instead of being held on a physical runway, in an experimental move towards new media. That year Dolce & Gabbana also designed the costumes for the film Romeo + Juliet.

In terms of personal awards, FHM named Dolce & Gabbana as the designers of the year in 1996 and 1997.

=== 2000s ===
Dolce & Gabbana designed costumes for the concert tours of Beyoncé and Mary J. Blige and Whitney Houston's My Love Is Your Love tour. They also designed stage costumes for Kylie Minogue's Showgirl Homecoming Tour and included Madonna in their 2010 advertising campaigns.

During this time, Dolce & Gabbana drew inspiration from the sport of football, and their designs continued to influence trends in both fashion and music. From 2004 to 2014, the brand worked with AC Milan to produce the team's official off-field suits. In 2002, their early corset designs were revived by many European designers as a trend. The brand also began holding private viewings of their new collections for buyers to pre-empt the copying of their designs by fast fashion companies.

In 2003, GQ Magazine awarded Dolce & Gabbana the title of "Men of the Year". British Elle readers voted Dolce & Gabbana the best designers at the 2004 Elle Style Awards.

In 2006, the company started a new journey in accessories and leather goods for men and women. In the same year, the brand launched a controversial ad campaign featuring two men kissing, which received criticism from some conservatives. However, the Advertising Standards Authority of Italy did not find the ad unacceptable for broadcast solely based on the depiction of two men kissing.

In February 2009, the Dolce&Gabbana makeup line was launched. Dolce & Gabbana created their first makeup in collaboration with make-up artist Pat McGrath. Scarlett Johansson appeared as the face of the advertising campaign for this new line.

=== 2010s ===
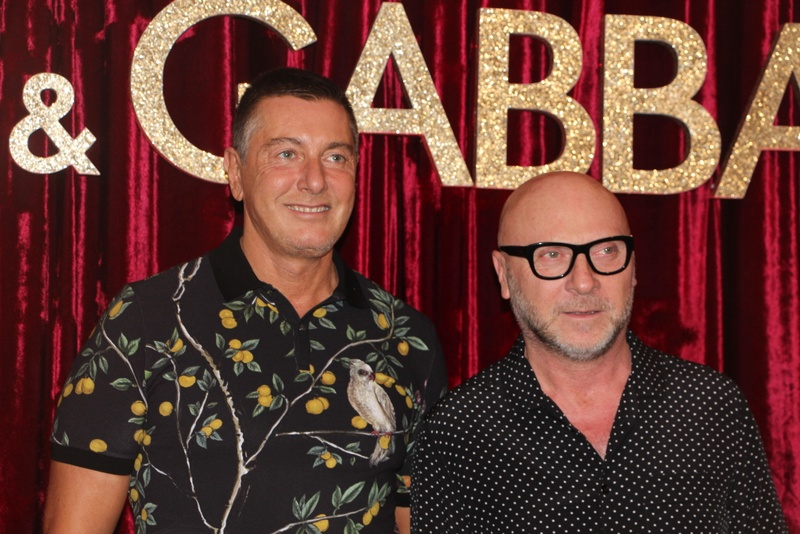
Stefano Gabbana (left) and Domenico Dolce (right) in 2016

In 2011, Dolce&Gabbana merged with D&G, with the aim of strengthening the main line. The final independent D&G collection was the Spring/Summer 2012 collection shown in September 2011. The New Yorker publication in 2005 stated that, "Dolce and Gabbana are becoming to the two-thousands what Prada was to the nineteen-nineties and Armani was to the nineteen-eighties—designers whose sensibility defines the decade."

In 2019, Dolce & Gabbana extended its size range up to UK 22, making them one of the first luxury fashion houses to move towards body positivity and inclusivity for women. While many high-end fashion houses produce women's clothing only up to size UK 16, Dolce & Gabbana has expanded its size range to include larger sizes.

=== 2020s ===
In September 2021, Dolce&Gabbana collaborated with UNXD to issue Collezione Genesi NFT, its first non-fungible token (NFT) collection. The collection consisted of nine pieces, including five physical and four digital creations, such as "Glass Suit" and "Impossible Tiara", and was sold for 1,885.719 Ether (equivalent to nearly $5.7 million). This collaboration with UNXD was a significant move towards the incorporation of blockchain technology into the fashion industry, and was widely reported by publications such as Vogue and The New York Times as being one of the first NFT collections created by a major fashion house. A subsequent NFT project, DGFamily, launched with UNXD in 2022, later became the subject of a class-action lawsuit in the United States.

Dolce&Gabbana collaborated with the British-American designer Harris Reed to present Somali model Iman Abdulmajid at the 2021 Met Gala fashion event in New York City.

In 2022, Dolce & Gabbana collaborated with American media personality Kim Kardashian on the Ciao Kim capsule collection, which included garments in black, white, and silver, incorporating lace, crystals, and animal prints. In 2023, Kardashian appeared in the brand's Spring/Summer campaign, photographed by Mert Alas and Marcus Piggott.

In addition to working with public figures, Dolce & Gabbana has developed co-branded products with Italian companies in industries such as food, glassmaking, home décor, and textiles. These include Baci Perugina, Fiasconaro, and Murano-based firms such as Barovier & Toso, Venini, Salviati, Barbini, I Dogi, and Mian, as well as the textile producer Tessiture Bevilacqua. The collaborations have involved limited-edition packaging, food products, glassware, and fabrics.

In 2023, Dolce&Gabbana won the Craft and Artisanship Award at the CNMI Sustainable Fashion Awards.

In April 2026, Stefano Gabbana announced he had resigned from the company in December 2025. At the time of announcement, he is exploring options to sell his 40% stake in the company. The resignation was reported amid the company's preparations for negotiations with its bank lenders over refinancing approximately €450 million of debt.

== Brand extensions ==
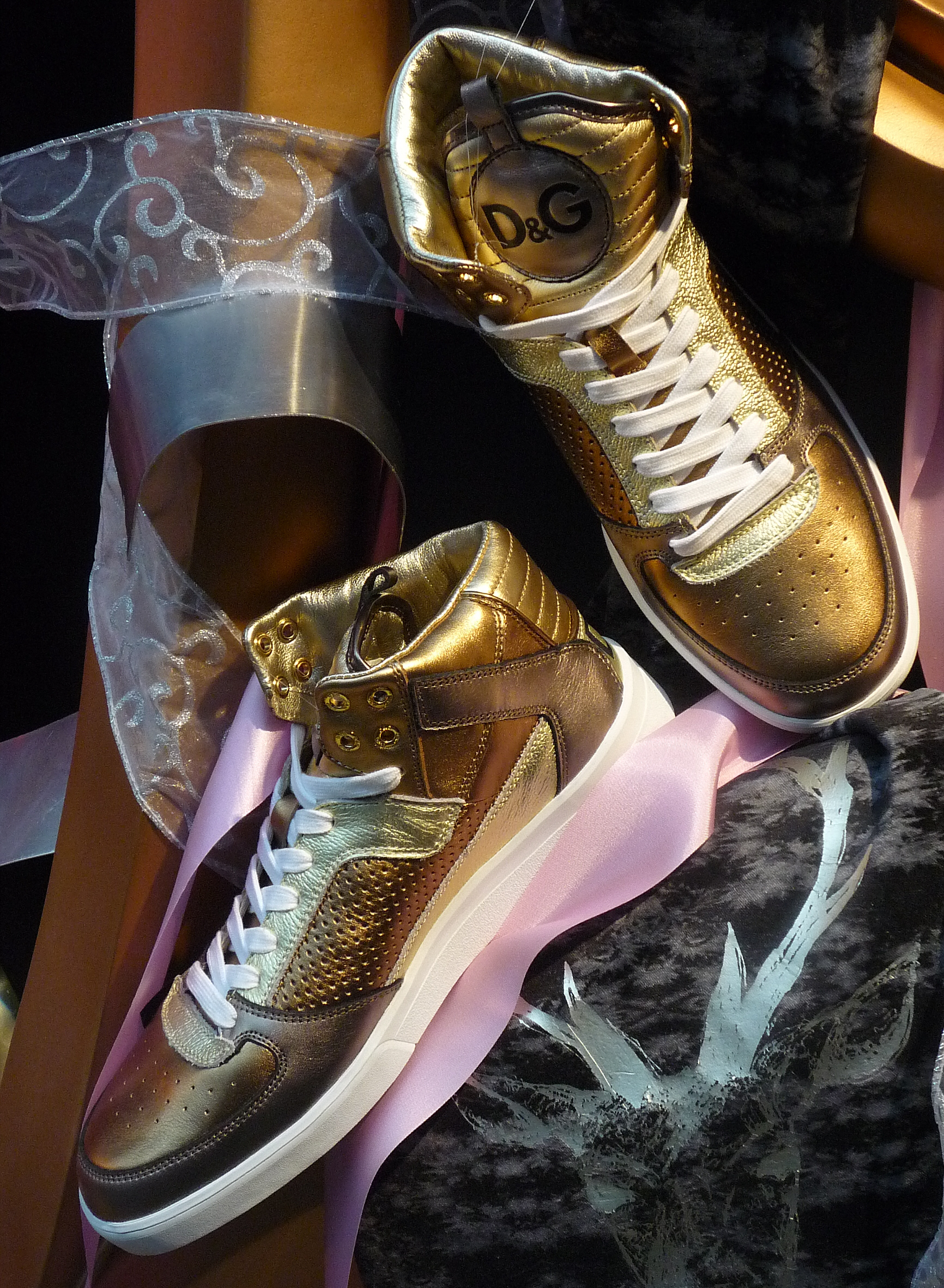
A pair of Dolce & Gabbana's Golden Sneakers

Dolce & Gabbana operated two distinct lines, D&G and Dolce&Gabbana, until 2011, when the lines merged under the label Dolce&Gabbana.

=== Dolce&Gabbana ===
Dolce&Gabbana (spelled without spaces, unlike the name of the company) is an Italian fashion brand established as the main label of Dolce & Gabbana. In 2010, the brand announced a collaboration with American singer Madonna on a sunglasses collection called MDG, released in May of that year.

In addition to clothing and accessories, Dolce&Gabbana produces fragrances for both men and women, including The One (2008).

=== D&G ===
D&G was a diffusion line under Dolce & Gabbana, aimed at a younger demographic and known for more expressive styles. In addition to apparel, the line included watches produced under license by Naloni and the Binda Group. In 2011, Dolce & Gabbana discontinued the D&G line in order to focus on their main collections, stating the intent to concentrate resources on the core brand.

=== Dolce&Gabbana Beauty ===
In 2009, they launched their first line of color cosmetics, with Scarlett Johansson as the face of the advertising campaign. In 2009, they launched their first line of color cosmetics, with Scarlett Johansson as the face of the advertising campaign.

In 2022, the company established a dedicated Dolce&Gabbana Beauty subsidiary to manage its cosmetics and fragrance business in-house, rather than licensing it out. According to the company, this initiative created 250 jobs and was the first time an Italian fashion house directly managed its beauty operations.

Creative direction for the beauty lines continues to involve Domenico Dolce and Stefano Gabbana, with Alfonso Dolce serving as president and Gianluca Toniolo as CEO. In 2022, fragrances accounted for approximately 95% of the segment's revenue, with ongoing expansion into colour cosmetics and skincare, excluding technologically intensive treatments. By 2023, colour cosmetics accounted for 10-20% of D&G Beauty's income. By the fiscal year 2024–2025, D&G Beauty accounted for approximately 35% of Dolce & Gabbana's total revenue. The division expanded its portfolio to include more than 100 makeup products and launched a skincare line in 2025. D&G Beauty also established dedicated beauty boutiques and extended its retail footprint across the Americas, Europe, and the Middle East.

The brand's beauty division has expanded its range of products in the 2020s, adding new fragrance lines (such as K, Q, and limited editions of the longtime Light Blue scent) as well as a cosmetics line. In 2024, D&G Beauty even introduced a novelty pet fragrance.

=== Dolce&Gabbana Alta Moda ===
Alta Moda, the Italian term for haute couture, was launched in 2012, inspired by Giovanni Battista Giorgini's efforts to promote Italian fashion and Made in Italy brands abroad. Over the years, the concept behind the project's idea of couture was to pay a tribute to the Italian domestic artisanship in all its expressions and to its tailoring tradition. Since its first runway show, Dolce&Gabbana has presented new collections at Italian landmarks such as Teatro alla Scala in Milan, Piazza San Marco in Venice or Temple of Concordia, Agrigento.

The main lines of the Alta Moda are:

- Alta Moda – Haute couture womenswear
- Alta Sartoria – Haute couture menswear
- Alta Gioielleria – Fine jewellery for women and men
- Alta Orologeria – Fine watchmaking for women and men

==== Timeline ====
- July 2012 – Taormina. The first Dolce & Gabbana Alta Moda presentation takes place in Taormina, Sicily, and consists of 73 designs that highlighted the Italian artisanship. The show began with a launch of Bellini's Bel Canto opera Norma in the ancient Roman amphitheater, followed by the event next day in the former monastery of San Domenico. The first autumn/winter collection was made in keeping with the traditions of Sicilian historical periods, including modern adaptation of Luchino Visconti's The Leopard (1963 film) radiating the changes in Sicilian life and society during the Risorgimento.
- 2013 – Milan/Venice. Dolce&Gabbana presents its first Alta Moda in Milan. The Collection was influenced by the symbols of the city. Dolce&Gabbana presented its third Alta Moda Collection in the frescoed halls of the historic Palazzo Barbaro in Venice overlooking the Grand Canal. The fashion show was followed by a masked ball inside another historic Venetian palace – Palazzo Pisani Moretta.
- 2014 – Milan/Capri. Impressionist and Modern Art Collections were demonstrated in La Scala, Milan's 18th-century opera house with the flower style designs. Dolce&Gabbana presented the Alta Moda Collection on the island of Capri.
- 2015 – Milan/Portofino. Dolce&Gabbana presented the Alta Moda Collection in the Toscanini foyer of Teatro alla Scala . Alta Sartoria and Alta Gioielleria Collection amplified couture line for men and women upheld in the Palazzo Labus, a 17th-century building in Corso Venezia, followed by the new Alta Moda, Alta Sartoria and Alta Gioielleria Collections during a 4-day event in Portofino in July. The Portofino collection was influenced by William Shakespeare's A Midsummer Night's Dream and became one of the designers' biggest productions with 94 models and 80 performers taking part in the show.
- 2016 – Milan/Naples. Alta Moda in Milan was dedicated to Elvira Leonardi Bouyeure, a notable Italian fashion designer and couturier of the post-war period who lived in the same city. The events started with the presentation of the Alta Gioielleria inside the Alta Moda Salons of Via Senato. The following day, the historic Palazzo Labus hosted the Alta Sartoria fashion show. The collection included lines for men and women as well as "molto Italiano" – Alta Moda jewellery craftsmanship that reflected historic art influence, such as painted vistas of Venice. Milan's La Scala was the stage of the Alta Moda show: the clothes were influenced by the heroines of the operas of the composer Giacomo Puccini. Villa Pignatelli was the location for the presentation of the new Alta Gioielleria creations and Castel dell'Ovo was the setting for the Alta Sartoria fashion show.
- 2017 – Milan/Palermo. Alta Moda Milan fashion show took place inside the laboratories of Teatro alla Scala in Milan, former Ansaldo steelworks. The Alta Gioielleria creations were presented inside the Alta Moda Salons in Via Senato while, the stage of Teatro alla Scala hosted the Alta Sartoria fashion show; the collection was entirely dedicated to the Italian composer Giuseppe Verdi and his masterpieces. During the Men's show, were presented the first four examples of Alta Orologeria.
- April 2017 – Tokyo, Japan and Beijing, China. On 13 April, Dolce & Gabbana presented its Alta Moda womenswear and Alta Sartoria menswear collections at the National Museum of Tokyo, a tribute to the Japanese culture and Italian tradition: Asian engravings and references to Renaissance painting, oriental and Baroque styles. One week later, the Peninsula Hotel in Beijing hosted the Ode to China Alta Moda and Alta Sartoria fashion show dedicated to the Chinese arts culture.
- July 2017 – Palermo. Alta Moda Palermo was held in Pretoria Square in the historical center of Palermo. Palazzo Gangi hosted the presentation of the new Women's Alta Gioielleria creations; for the first time, a Collection of Men's Alta Gioielleria pieces were showcased at Palazzo Mazzarino. The Alta Moda looks illuminated Piazza Pretoria, while the setting for the Alta Sartoria fashion show was the Cathedral of Monreale.
- April 2018 – New York, USA and Mexico City, Mexico. Dolce&Gabbana brought the Grand Tour to New York, where the 4-day events opened with the presentation of the Alta Gioielleria Collection, hosted by Sarah Jessica Parker at the New York Public Library, where she auctioned off Dolce & Gabbana jewelry and her dress for charity, and fashion shows featuring iconic New York landmarks and supermodels like Karlie Kloss and Naomi Campbell. The Alta Sartoria fashion show took place at the Rainbow Room of Rockefeller Center and the Alta Moda show was staged at the Metropolitan Opera House. A few days after the events in New York, Dolce & Gabbana showcased their Alta Moda collection in Mexico City on 18 April. The collection, inspired by Mexican culture, blended elements like rebozos, vibrant colors, and Frida Kahlo-inspired hairstyles with the brand's signature Baroque style. The runway event took place at the Soumaya Museum and Mexican influencers such as Juan Pablo Zurita, Diego Boneta, and Mariana Zaragoza, highlighting Mexico's growing influence in the fashion industry.
- 2018 – Como/Milan. In 2018, the show was held on the shores of the lake Como. The presentation of the new Alta Gioielleria creations was held on the Steamship Concordia sailing towards Bellagio. The Alta Moda show took place at the Teresio Olivelli Park in Tremezzina. The collection was a tribute to the first historical novel of Italian literature, The Betrothed. Villa Carlotta was the location for the Alta Sartoria show. Among the top models who presented Alta Moda collection were Naomi Campbell, Eva Herzigova and Helena Christensen.
- 2019 – Agrigento/Milan. Alta Moda 2019 was first held in Agrigento, a city on the southern coast of Sicily with more than 400 guests visiting the show. The main event was the womenswear show Alta Moda. Another collection – the Alta Gioielleria – took place in a nearby town of Palma di Montechiaro, the birthplace of Giuseppe Tomasi di Lampedusa. In December of the same year, the brand presented a new menswear collection at the Biblioteca Ambrosiana in Milan, a historic library founded in 1609 by Archbishop Cardinal Borromeo.
- 2020 – Florence. Due to COVID-19, Dolce & Gabbana held two online summer shows of Alta Moda in July 2020. There was also a single live three-day event that happened in September 2020, while Alta Moda and Alta Sartoria were also presented online. The menswear collection Dolce & Gabbana Alta Sartoria was housed in the 12th-century Palazzo Vecchio and included such items as brocade velvet blazers, silk blouses and jewel-caked slippers.
- 2021 – Venice. Dolce & Gabbana held an Alta Moda event in Venice to coincide with the 1600th anniversary of the city's founding. Presentations took place across several historic locations, including the Doge's Palace, the Venetian Arsenal, and the Rialto Bridge. Models arrived by gondola, and the Alta Sartoria and Alta Gioielleria collections were also shown during the multi-day event, which incorporated references to Venetian art and architecture.
- 2022 – Sicily. In 2022, the brand commemorated the 10th anniversary of Alta Moda with a four-day celebration in Sicily. Events were staged in cities such as Syracuse and Palermo, with a star-studded audience that included Drew Barrymore, Lupita Nyong'o, and Emma Roberts. The collections emphasized Sicilian culture and artisanal craftsmanship. Later that year, Dolce & Gabbana hosted the Alta Moda and Alta Casa "Takeover" at the Miami Surf Club. The event showcased over 100 handmade looks along with furniture and homeware inspired by Mediterranean aesthetics, reinforcing the brand's commitment to "fatto a mano" multigenerational craftsmanship.
- 2023 – Apulia. In July 2023, Dolce & Gabbana staged its annual Alta Moda events in the Valle d'Itria region of Apulia, Southern Italy. Alta Moda was presented in the streets of Alberobello, while the Alta Sartoria show took place in Ostuni. The Alta Gioielleria collection was showcased at Spazio Ulivi Pettolecchia. The event also marked the release of Dolce&Gabbana Alta Gioielleria: Masterpieces of High Jewellery, a book edited by Carol Woolton, highlighting the brand's most notable creations in high jewelry.
- 2024 – Sardinia. In 2024, the Alta Moda presentations moved to Sardinia, for a multi-day programme celebrating the island's cultural heritage and artisanal traditions. The Alta Gioielleria collection was unveiled at the Forte Village resort on 1 July, followed by the Alta Moda runway show at the archaeological park of Nora on 2 July and the Alta Sartoria presentation at Forte Village on 3 July.
- 2025 – Rome. In 2025, the Alta Moda presentations were staged in Rome for the first time, through a multi-day programme inspired by the artistic, archaeological and religious heritage of the Eternal City. The Alta Gioielleria collection was unveiled at Hadrian's Villa in Tivoli on 13 July, with creations referencing the splendour of imperial Rome. The Alta Moda runway show followed on 14 July along the Via Sacra in the Roman Forum, drawing on classical sculpture and the glamour of 1950s Italian cinema. The programme concluded on 15 July with the Alta Sartoria show between Ponte Sant'Angelo and Castel Sant'Angelo, whose collection incorporated references to ecclesiastical tailoring, sacred iconography and ceremonial dress.

=== Dolce&Gabbana Casa Furnishings and Furnishing Accessories ===
The Dolce & Gabbana Home Collection, introduced in 1994, was discontinued in 1999, except for individual items produced for use in D&G retail spaces or offices. In August 2021, Dolce&Gabbana introduced its first Casa furnishings and furnishing accessories collection, which was previewed in Venice during the Alta Moda events. The collection was organized around four themes - Leo, Zebra, Blu Mediterraneo, and Carretto - and included furniture and interior items such as table ornaments, chandeliers, cabinetry, textiles, and other home décor objects. The Casa brand's products were created through collaborations with Italian artisans, including Venetian furniture experts such as Barovier & Toso, Mian, I Dogi, Venini, Barbini, Salviati, and Tessiture Bevilacqua, who provided their procedural knowledge to the company. As of March 2022, the Casa brand collection was mainly available online.

=== Other product lines ===
==== Bridal collection ====
The bridal category consists of wedding attire (mostly custom couture gowns). For instance, the brand's Alta Moda studio designs made-to-order bridal gowns – one high-profile example being the multiple Dolce & Gabbana wedding dresses created for model Lady Kitty Spencer's 2021 wedding.

==== Underwear and Beachwear ====
In 1989, Dolce & Gabbana expanded its product range by introducing beachwear and the Intimo lingerie line. The company later added men's beachwear in 1992. In 2000, D&G launched both a men's and women's underwear collection, separate from their Dolce & Gabbana lingerie collection.

==== Eyewear ====
Eyewear products, including sunglasses and optical frames, are produced under license; for example, D&G has a long-term agreement with Luxottica for manufacturing and distribution of its eyewear collections.

==== Junior Collection ====
Dolce & Gabbana has a children's clothing line that provides apparel for boys and girls.

==== Anamalier collection ====
In 2006 the duo launched the Anamalier line of leopard print accessories for women, and in 2007 they launched a line of crocodile travel cases for men. Other bags produced by the house include the Miss Sicily tote bag and the "Dolce" bag, available in straw and leather versions.

==== Jewelry ====
Dolce & Gabbana launched its first line of fine jewellery in late 2011 with an 80-piece line including bejewelled rosaries, charm bracelets, and necklaces. They later launched a fine jewellery collection for men.

==== Perfume ====
Dolce & Gabbana's fragrance line has been recognized with industry awards. Current products include "The One", "Sport", "Light Blue", "Dolce", "Classic", "Sicily", "The One Rose", as well as the original scents "Pour Homme" and "Parfum". On 16 October 2014, the company announced that actor Colin Farrell would appear in promotional materials for a new fragrance titled "Intenso".

== Collaborations ==
=== Sports ===
Since 2004, Dolce&Gabbana has collaborated with A.C. Milan to design their on-field attire. Additionally, A.C. Milan players wear team-issued Dolce & Gabbana clothing for official functions off the field. The brand also created off-field suits for the Italy national football team. In 2010, a three-year agreement was reached between Dolce&Gabbana and Chelsea F.C. to provide the club's on- and off-field uniforms and attire, including outfits for female staff members. The deal included the creation of clothing for female staff members in addition to male staff members and the players themselves. The off-field outfits consisted of a dark blue suit with the lion symbol on the breast pocket. In addition, the designers revamped the club's director's lounge and main office reception area. Dolce&Gabbana also served as sponsors for the Milano Thunder Italian Boxing Team.

Dolce & Gabbana has participated in several collaborations beyond high fashion. In the 2000s, the company worked with Motorola and Sony Ericsson on limited-edition mobile phones, contributed to a special-edition Citroën C3, and was involved in a project with Martini for a version of its vermouth. In 2010, the brand also released a sunglasses line (MDG) in collaboration with Madonna. In October 2024, Dolce & Gabbana collaborated with Stabilo to release a set of highlighters.

=== Kitchen appliances and food products ===
The collaboration between Dolce & Gabbana and Smeg, established in 2016, combines Italian fashion design with appliance manufacturing to create a range of kitchen appliances. The "Sicily is My Love" collection includes refrigerators, ranges, and small appliances decorated with motifs inspired by Italian culture and Sicilian themes. The designs are categorized into two themes: Sicilian puppet theater and motifs inspired by Mount Etna and Greek ruins. Initially introduced at Milan Design Week, the collection has expanded over time, with new items launched in 2019.

The brand also launched the Dolce&Gabbana Perfetto Coffee, coffee product and tin set designed by Dolce & Gabbana, in collaboration with Italian stovetop coffee company, Bialetti.

In the 2020s, the brand extended into food and gourmet products through design collaborations, producing co-branded Italian gourmet items like pastries (with Fiasconaro), wine (with Donnafugata), and chocolates (with Baci Perugina).

== Fashion Designers supported by D&G ==
In December 2021, Domenico Dolce and Stefano Gabbana announced a collaboration with South Korean designer Sohee Park for the Fall/Winter 2022 Milan Fashion Week. Prior to launching her own label, Park completed internships at brands including Marc Jacobs and Molly Goddard. Her first collection, The Girl In Full Bloom, received media coverage, with individual pieces appearing in outlets such as Vogue and Vanity Fair. Designs by Park were shown during Milan Fashion Week under the Dolce & Gabbana Alta Moda label.

=== Matty Bovan ===
British designer Matty Bovan presented his first collection at Milan Fashion Week with logistical and financial support from Dolce & Gabbana. After encountering Bovan's work on Instagram, the brand assisted with production and staffing. His collection included hand-painted fabrics, corsetry, and knitwear with varied color patterns. It was produced in Yorkshire by local artisans, reflecting Bovan's interest in traditional craftsmanship. A graduate of Central Saint Martins, Bovan is known for combining unconventional design with established techniques.

=== Tomo Koizumi ===
Dolce & Gabbana collaborated with Japanese designer Tomo Koizumi, known for his vibrant and sculptural designs, as part of their ongoing support for emerging talent. Koizumi, who launched his brand in Tokyo in 2011, has dressed celebrities like Lady Gaga and was a finalist for the LVMH Prize. In this collaboration, Koizumi integrated Dolce & Gabbana's renowned Carretto print into his designs, merging his artistic vision with recognizable patterns associated with the brand. Despite the collection's acclaim, Koizumi highlighted that his designs are primarily artistic expressions and not intended for commercial production.

== Advertising campaign ==
The debut commercial for Dolce&Gabbana's first women's fragrance, starring Monica Bellucci and directed by Giuseppe Tornatore, ran for several years in Italy. Set to the score of Ennio Morricone, the 30-second ad showcases different women going about their daily lives, with Bellucci changing into a vintage-style bathing suit behind a white sheet held up by two women. She then throws her bra on a cactus, and walks towards the ocean. In another scene, she is lying on a bed while a man stands outside her window holding her bra to his nose. The commercial ends with a shot of the fragrance bottles against a black backdrop. In 2003, Giuseppe Tornatore directed another commercial for the Dolce & Gabbana perfume Sicily, which was set at a Sicilian funeral.

Gisele Bündchen starred in the 2006 commercial for the fragrance "The One". The ad shows her getting ready in front of a vanity mirror, with flashes of paparazzi cameras appearing throughout. She then puts on a golden dress, shoes, and a pair of D&G sunglasses. Dolce&Gabbana has worked with numerous photographers and filmmakers on their advertising campaigns, including Giampaolo Barbieri, Michel Comte, Fabrizio Ferri, Steven Klein, Steven Meisel, Mert + Marcus, Jean Baptiste Mondino, Ferdinando Scianna, Giampaolo Sgura, Mario Sorrenti, Sølve Sundsbø, Mario Testino, Giuseppe Tornatore, and Mariano Vivanco. he design house has won two Leadawards for their campaigns, one in 2004 for their Fall/Winter 2003/04 campaign, and another in 2006 for their Fall/Winter 2005/06 campaign.

== Inspirations and style ==
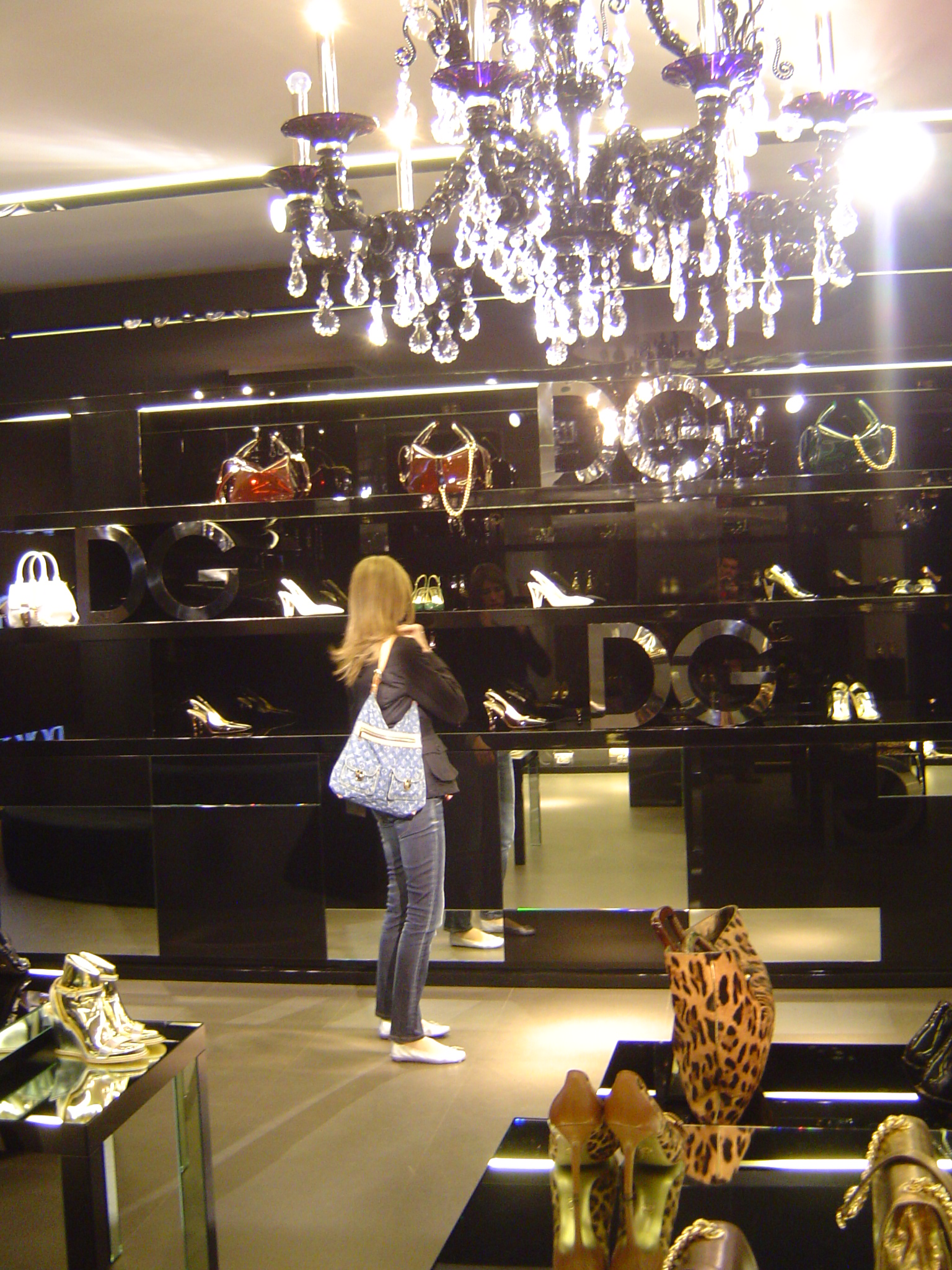
The Dolce & Gabbana store of Via della Spiga in Milan

Dolce & Gabbana's style is influenced by Italy's film history and thrift shop bohemian style, resulting in deeply coloured and animal print designs that have been described as "haute hippy dom". According to Domenico Dolce, the duo designs clothes to tell a story, similar to making a movie. Creating the most flattering clothes is their priority over setting fashion trends, and they have stated that they would not mind if their only contribution to fashion history was a black bra. The designers strongly identify with Sicilian culture and consider it their most important source of style and inspiration (Dolce & Gabbana 2007).

Dolce & Gabbana gained attention for early marketing campaigns, including a 1987 black-and-white photo series with model Marpessa, photographed by Ferdinando Scianna. The brand's design approach has been noted for its focus on form-fitting silhouettes; actress Isabella Rossellini once commented that a white shirt by the brand was tailored in a way that emphasised her figure.

In 1996, Dolce & Gabbana released a single containing the phrase "D&G is love" set to a techno soundtrack. The pair were once called the "Gilbert and George of Italian fashion." Although relatively new to the fashion industry compared to Italian giants such as Armani and Versace, the designers attribute their success in part to luck.

Dolce & Gabbana discovered a painting by a Venetian artist of Christ on the cross wearing their branded underwear briefs at the Venice Biennale. They commissioned the artist to paint their portrait, with the Madonna resembling pop icon Madonna Ciccone and the courtiers depicted as two putti at her feet.

In January 2016, the design house introduced a fashion line intended for Muslim women, which included hijabs and abayas decorated with floral and fruit motifs such as daisies, lemons, and roses.

== Books ==
In addition to designing clothing, Dolce & Gabbana have co-authored nearly two dozen books, including photographic series and compilations of their work. The proceeds of many of these books go to charities including the Children's Action Network and the Butterfly Onlus "école sans frontières" Foundation. The following is a bibliography of their literary works:

- 1996 – 10 Anni Dolce & Gabbana (A collection of the most important advertising and editorial images of the design house's first decade) ISBN 978-8878135789
- 1997 – Wildness ASIN B000KW5O5O
- 1998 – Animal ISBN 978-0789204394
- 2003 – Hollywood (A collection of over 100 photographs depicting film actors active after 1985) ISBN 978-2843235269
- Calcio (Photographs of 44 soccer players, 3 teams, and 2 coaches)
- A.C. Milan
- 2004 – Music (A book containing more than 150 photographs of musicians from various countries) ISBN 978-2843234606
- 20 Years Dolce & Gabbana (A chronological photographic history of each of the house's collections, using over 1000 photos)
- 2006 – Milan ISBN 978-8837044381
- 2006 Italia (A book celebrating the 2006 World Cup title won by Italy)
- 2006 – Fashion Album (Contains over 400 images paying homage to the great fashion photographers of Dolce & Gabbana collections) ISBN 978-8876248498
- 2007 – Secret Ceremony ASIN B001X6NJLW
- Family (A book that focuses on the family as the center of a man's life)
- The Good Shepherd (A book that illustrates the day of a common shepherd, wearing Dolce & Gabbana clothing)
- Milano Beach Soccer
- 2008 – Diamonds & Pearls ISBN 978-8837057497
- 2010 – 20 Years of Dolce & Gabbana for Men ISBN 978-8837077037
- 2011 – Icons 1990–2010 ISBN 978-8837079642
- 2011 – Fashion Shows 1990 – 2010 ISBN 978-8837079635
- Nazionale Italiana: South Africa 2010 (A series of images starring the Italy National Football Team during the training sessions preceding the 2010 FIFA World Cup)
- 2011 – Uomini ISBN 978-0847837007
- Milan Fashion Soccer Players Portraits
- 2011 – David Gandy (A 280-page photographic coffee table book of images chronicling collaborations with British model David Gandy from 2006 to 2011) ISBN 978-0847837526
- 2012 – Campioni ISBN 978-0847840212
- 2013 – Lionel Andres Messi ISBN 978-0847841677
- 2016 – Lin Dan ISBN 978-0847847204
- 2017 – Generations: Millennials: The New Renaissance ISBN 978-8891815972
- 2023 – Dolce&Gabbana Alta Gioielleria: Masterpieces of High Jewellery, edited by Carol Woolton ISBN 978-8891836946
- 2023 – Nero: The Color of Dolce&Gabbana ISBN 978-8891839039

== Spaces and exhibitions ==
Dolce&Gabbana established La sede di via San Damiano atelier in September 1995, followed by the Lo showroom di via Goldoni, a seven-floor boutique and corporate space in 2002. They moved from their previous main showroom at Piazza Umanitaria to this new location. In July 2006, they opened another 5,000 square foot show floor at Lo showroom di via Broggi in Milan. The fashion house also purchased the Il Metropol theatre, a historic cinema in Milan built in the 1940s, which underwent renovation and was reopened in September 2005. In 2006, Dolce & Gabbana inaugurated IL GOLD, an establishment with café, bar, bistro, and restaurant areas. Additionally, they opened the Martini Bar, a co-sponsored drinking establishment at their Milanese men's showroom in 2003, followed by another Martini Bar at their Shanghai showroom in 2006. As of 2009, Dolce&Gabbana had 93 boutiques and 11 factory outlets and were sold in over 80 countries, with a total of 251 mono-brand stores.

Apart from developing runway shows and advertising campaigns for its collections, Dolce & Gabbana uses its spaces to host photography and art exhibitions. After the opening of the Il Metropol, they hosted two exhibitions by artist Ron Arad in the lobby space: Blo-Glo between April 2006 and April 2007, and Bodyguards in late April 2007. The brand also organized photography exhibitions showcasing the work of Enzo Sellerio in 2007 and Herbert List in 2008. In 2011, Dolce & Gabbana hosted an open house and architectural exhibition with Studio Piuarch, showcasing the studio's various architectural designs and projects since 1996. Studio Piuarch built the Dolce & Gabbana headquarters in 2006, where the exhibition and open house were held.

Dolce & Gabbana also uses its spaces for book launches and photographic exhibitions of its own clothing, such as the book launch of their book David Gandy in 2011. Additionally, they use other spaces, such as the Palazzo della Ragione in Milan, where they held a photographic exhibition of over 100 images selected from the history of US Vogue over its 90-year history in May 2009. The exhibition was called Extreme Beauty in Vogue.

The company has production factories in Legnano and Incisa in Val d'Arno.

== Controversies ==
=== Advertising ===
In early 2007, D&G was criticized in the UK over adverts which showed some models wielding knives and others with graphic wounds. The ads were called irresponsible, and the Advertising Standards Authority warned that the ads could be seen as glorifying knife-related violence.

Following complaints from consumer groups in February 2007, Dolce & Gabbana pulled an advertisement in Spain that showed a man holding a woman to the ground by her wrists while a group of men looked on. Spain's Labour and Social Affairs Ministry branded the campaign as illegal and humiliating to women, saying the woman's body position had no relation to the products Dolce & Gabbana was trying to sell. Italian publications followed suit, banning the ad. The image was widely criticized as appearing to glamorize gang rape. When asked about the ad being banned in Spain, Dolce & Gabbana responded that the "Spaniards were a bit backward."

According to The Huffington Post UK, feminist writer Louise Pennington also commented on the image. She stated that, "This particular image is a representative of an increasingly misogynistic contraction of women in the fashion industry demonstrating very clear links between the fashion-beauty industry and the mainstreaming of pornography. Those who suggest this image is harmless fail to recognize the reality of rape culture and the dehumanization of women's bodies in our pornographic mainstream media."

=== Hong Kong photography ban ===
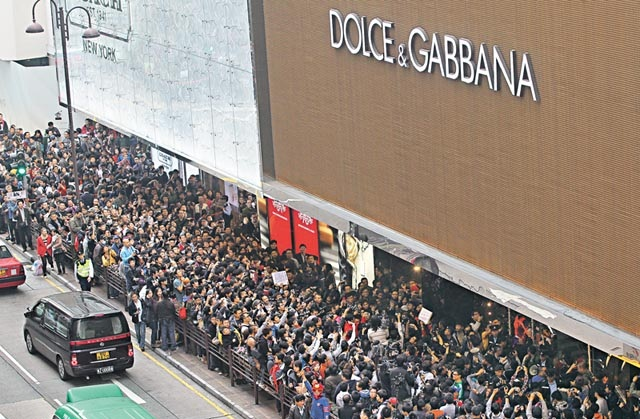
One of the four streets blocked during the Sunday protest

On 5 January 2012, it was reported that Hong Kong residents had been prevented from taking pictures of Dolce & Gabbana window displays in both their Hong Kong stores. In particular staff and security personnel at their flagship store on Canton Road asserted the pavement area outside was private property where photography was forbidden. The actions sparked protests spanning several days and gained international news coverage on 8 January. Citing the case of Zhou Jiugeng, a Nanjing official whose high-living lifestyle was identified by mainland Chinese internet users using photographs, local news reports speculated that the Dolce & Gabbana photo ban may have been imposed at the request of some wealthy Chinese government officials attempting to block details on the source of their wealth.

Dolce & Gabbana issued a formal apology to the people of Hong Kong from its Milan headquarters on 18 January 2012, confirming that it had no relation to the incident.

=== Blackamoor earrings and "Slave Sandal" ===
The brand's Spring 2013 runway show in Milan in September 2012 drew accusations of racial insensitivity for featuring earrings depicting Blackamoor figures. The designers defended the accessories by citing the imagery's history in Sicilian decorative arts.

In March 2016, a $2,395 lace-up shoe from the Spring 2016 collection appeared on the brand's website under the name "Slave Sandal in Napa Leather With Pompoms." Following the backlash, the company renamed the product "Decorative Flat Sandal" Retailers such as Saks Fifth Avenue had listed the shoe without the word "slave".

=== Gay adoption and in vitro fertilization ===
In an interview on 16 March 2015, issue of Italian magazine Panorama, Stefano Gabbana and Domenico Dolce caused controversy when they remarked, "We oppose gay adoptions. The only family is the traditional one." They also criticized in vitro fertilisation (IVF) and surrogacy by saying, "No chemical offspring and rented uterus: life has a natural flow, there are things that should not be changed."

Critics took to social media to voice their opposition, with the hashtag #BoycottDolceGabbana garnering 30,000 tweets on Twitter in five days. Celebrities, including Elton John, Madonna, Victoria Beckham, Ricky Martin, Martina Navratilova and Courtney Love, were among those expressing anger over the remarks. However, Zoe Saldana defended them citing this to be their personal opinions and a matter of free speech.

According to Guardian, "in an interview in 2006, Gabbana revealed that he had approached a woman to be the mother of his baby but made it clear that he struggled with the idea of a same-sex family. "I am opposed to the idea of a child growing up with two gay parents," he said. "A child needs a mother and a father. I could not imagine my childhood without my mother. I also believe that it is cruel to take a baby away from its mother."

More than 10,000 people signed an online petition calling for Macy's and Debenhams to stop stocking the brand in their department stores, until D&G retracted their statements and apologized. Protesters also gathered outside Dolce & Gabbana's flagship London shop calling for an international boycott of the luxury fashion store.

Dolce & Gabbana criticized calls for a boycott on their brand as "medieval" and called to boycott Elton John. During an interview with CNN, the pair said "they respected how people chose to live their lives, including the use of IVF, and said others should also respect differences in opinion. They also added that they could have expressed themselves using better language to the Italian magazine but appeared taken aback by the social media backlash. "

=== Dressing of Melania Trump and #Boycott campaign ===
A number of American designers announced, once Donald Trump had won the 2016 election, that the incoming First Lady would not be wearing their clothes. Dolce & Gabbana dressed Melania Trump all through 2017 regardless. Gabbana posted the outfits to his Instagram under #DGWoman, and #BoycottDolceGabbana, first turned against the house during the 2015 row over IVF, came back into use.

That June the label put a $245 T-shirt on sale printed with "#Boycott Dolce & Gabbana" and filmed models staging mock protests against the house, the videos went out tagged #fakenews and #realtshirt.

=== Shanghai event promotion video ===
In November 2018, Dolce & Gabbana released a series of videos on Instagram, Facebook and Twitter profiles, as well as its Sina Weibo account in China, featuring a Chinese model with her eye intentionally narrowed, dressed up in the brand's garments and accessories and clumsily attempting to use chopsticks to eat Italian food in a pretentious way. The video narration was is in Standard Mandarin with a hubristic and lecturing tone, while having sexually suggestive lines.

Social media users commented that it reflects Dolce & Gabbana's lack of understanding of Chinese culture and racism. Under the public pressure, D&G removed this series from its Sina Weibo while still keeping them on Instagram. Social media outcry was further exacerbated by a screen capture of racist comments alleged to have been made from the D&G co-founder Stefano Gabbana's Instagram account. Later Dolce & Gabbana claimed on Instagram that both the brand's and the designer's accounts had been hacked, also issuing a video where they apologized for the ads and asked for forgiveness from the Chinese people. "We have always been in love with China," Dolce said in the video. "We love your culture and we certainly have much to learn. That is why we are sorry if we made mistakes in the way we expressed ourselves." "We will never forget this experience and it will certainly never happen again," Gabbana said. "From the bottom of our hearts, we ask for forgiveness." Stefano Gabbana complained about removing the videos from the internet and called China the "Ignorant Dirty Smelling Mafia", adding that it was a "country of shit" and "feel inferiors" in the message.

Wang Junkai and Dilraba Dilmurat, both of whom served as the brand's celebrity ambassadors, severed their ties with the company. Other celebrities, including Zhang Ziyi, Li Bingbing and Chen Kun withdrew from the event. Ultimately, the show was cancelled by the brand.

Chinese e-commerce sites, including Alibaba and JD.com, removed the products of Dolce & Gabbana. The founders of Dolce & Gabbana apologized in a video on 23 November, which was posted on its Sina Weibo account, and also posted on Instagram and Facebook later. Throughout the video, the founders can be seen reading off a script from a teleprompter located on the right. At the end of the video, the founders were saying "对不起" (sorry) in Chinese. Meanwhile, the three videos were finally removed from the official Instagram account.

=== Legal issues ===
In May 2009, the Italian government charged Dolce & Gabbana with tax evasion for having moved assets of about 249 million euros to Luxembourg in the 2004–2006 period. On 19 June 2013, they were found guilty of failing to declare 1 billion euros ($1.3 billion) of income to authorities after moving their brand to Gado, a Luxembourg-based holding company. The court sentenced them both to one year and eight months in jail. Dolce & Gabbana filed an appeal. On 30 April 2014, a three judge panel overruled the appeal and decided to uphold the initial sentence. Finally, on 24 October 2014, both Domenico Dolce and Stefano Gabbana were found not guilty of tax evasion by the Supreme Court of Cassation.

Following the cancellation of their 2018 show in China, Dolce & Gabbana filed a lawsuit against fashion watchdog Diet Prada, claiming defamation by the bloggers who reposted anti-Asian comments made by one of their designers. The $USD600m claim argued that the Instagram account was responsible for encouraging public backlash, the cancellation of their show and loss of business. In the lawsuit, the petitioners once again claimed that their Instagram account was hacked and then publicly apologized for the incident. The loss of business in question includes Chinese retailer Yangmatou taking down 58,000 Dolce & Gabbana products from their store. Luxury western retailers, such as Net-a-Porter, also removed them from their brand list. Fashion Law Institute lawyers are defending the Diet Prada founders.

In May 2024 a buyer of the brand's DGFamily NFTs brought a proposed class action in the Southern District of New York. Named as defendants were Dolce & Gabbana USA, its Dubai partner UNXD, and Bluebear Italia. The project, launched in 2022, had promised digital clothing for the metaverse, physical garments, and access to brand events. The complaint said the companies had abandoned it with more than US$25 million in hand and never delivered. A "rug pull", the filing called it, borrowing the crypto term for a project dropped once the money is collected, and it argued the NFTs had been sold as unregistered securities. The lead plaintiff had put $6,000 into his tokens. After the delays, he said, they were worth 97% less.

A federal judge dismissed the claims against Dolce & Gabbana USA in July 2025. The American arm, the court held, was no "alter ego" of the Italian parent that ran the project.
