= Maria Callas Museum =

Museum in Athens, Greece

- Μουσείο Μαρία Κάλλας
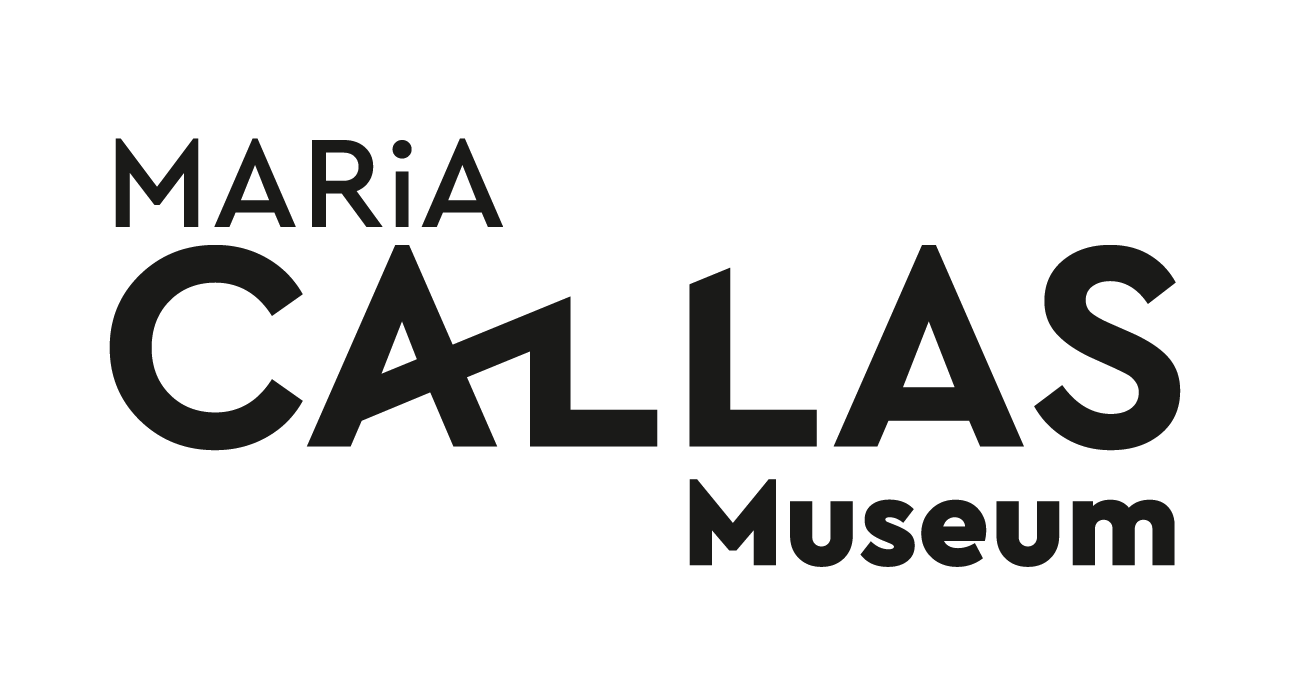

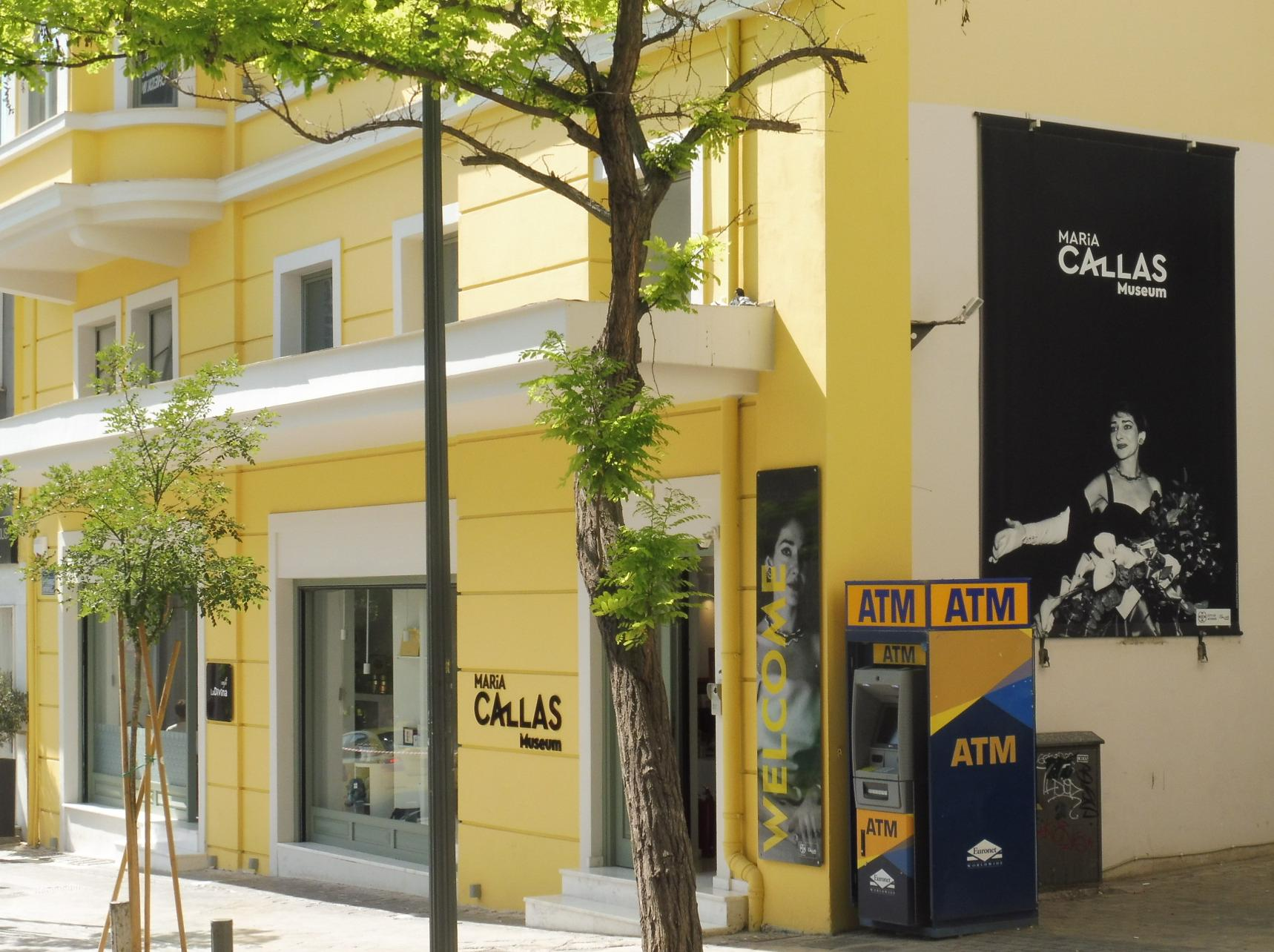
- Museum's façade, 2024
- Established: 2023
- Location: 44 Mitropoleos Street, Athens, Greece
- Coordinates: 37.9755°N 23.7308°E
- Type: Biographical museum
- Owner: Municipality of Athens
- Website: https://mariacallasmuseum.gr/en/

The Maria Callas Museum is a biographical museum dedicated to the renowned Greek soprano Maria Callas. It opened on 26 October 2023, and is situated near Syntagma Square at 44 Mitropoleos Street in Athens, Greece.

== History ==
In 2000, the Municipality of Athens took part at an auction of Callas' personal objects, thus initiating a small Callas-themed collection, with the initial prospect of creating an exhibition for the 2004 Summer Olympics. In 2010 under the mayorship of Nikitas Kaklamanis, the Municipality of Athens bought a three storey neoclassical building of the interwar period, previously the Royal Hotel, situated on 44 Mitropoleos Street, for 7 million euros. Three years later, a previous plan to house a theatrical museum at the building failed, and thus the idea for transferring the Callas collection there was born. The related museologic study by Erato Koutsoudaki, Andromache Gazi and Alexandros Charkiolakis was first presented in 2014. Eventually, the Maria Callas Museum was opened a decade later by Athens' mayor Kostas Bakoyannis on 26 October 2023. For the 2023–2028 period, its administration was assigned to the administrative board of the Technopolis cultural venue.

== Exhibits ==
The museum includes numerous personal objects, operatic costumes and personal haute couture garments, some created by Elvira Leonardi Bouyeure (Biki). According to the museum's co-designer, architect and museologist Erato Koutsoudaki, the museum's collection is not its "strong card"; instead, its exhibitions were designed around Callas' personality and include her singing voice and interviews.

On the second floor, the museum includes four rooms with objects, pictures and sound from Callas' roles in Norma, Tosca, La traviata, and her teaching of master classes at the Juilliard School. The first floor contains written, visual and audio material relating to important roles and people in Callas' life. With a view of the Acropolis, the third floor contains a mediatheque and is used for educational and performance events. The ground floor doubles as a museum shop and café, named 'La Divina'.

=== Gallery ===
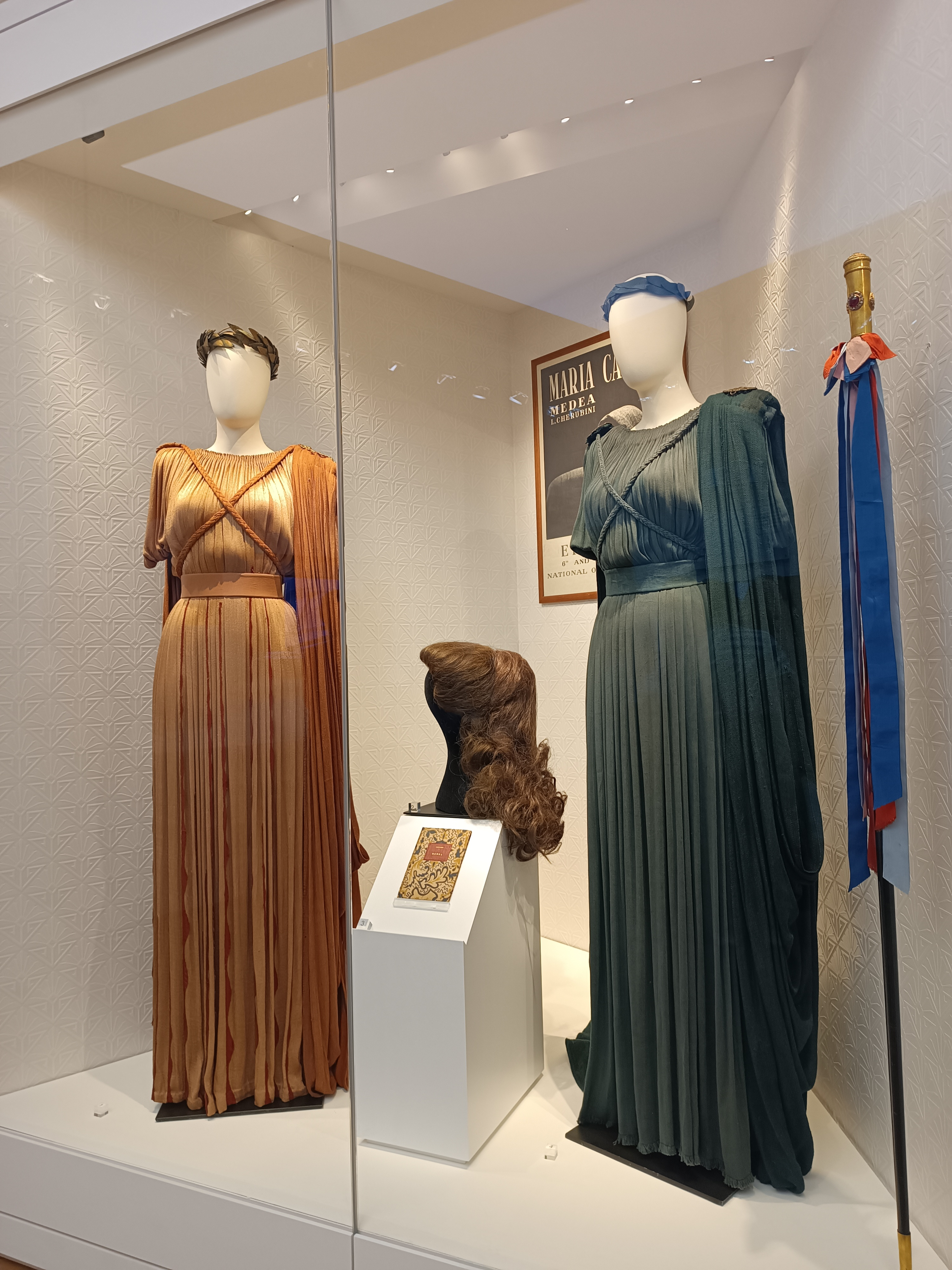
Callas' opera costumes from the 1960 Norma (costumes to the left and right) and the 1961 Medea (wig at the center), both performed in the ancient theatre of Epidaurus, and from the 1954 Tosca in Genoa, a thyrsus-like walking stick, right

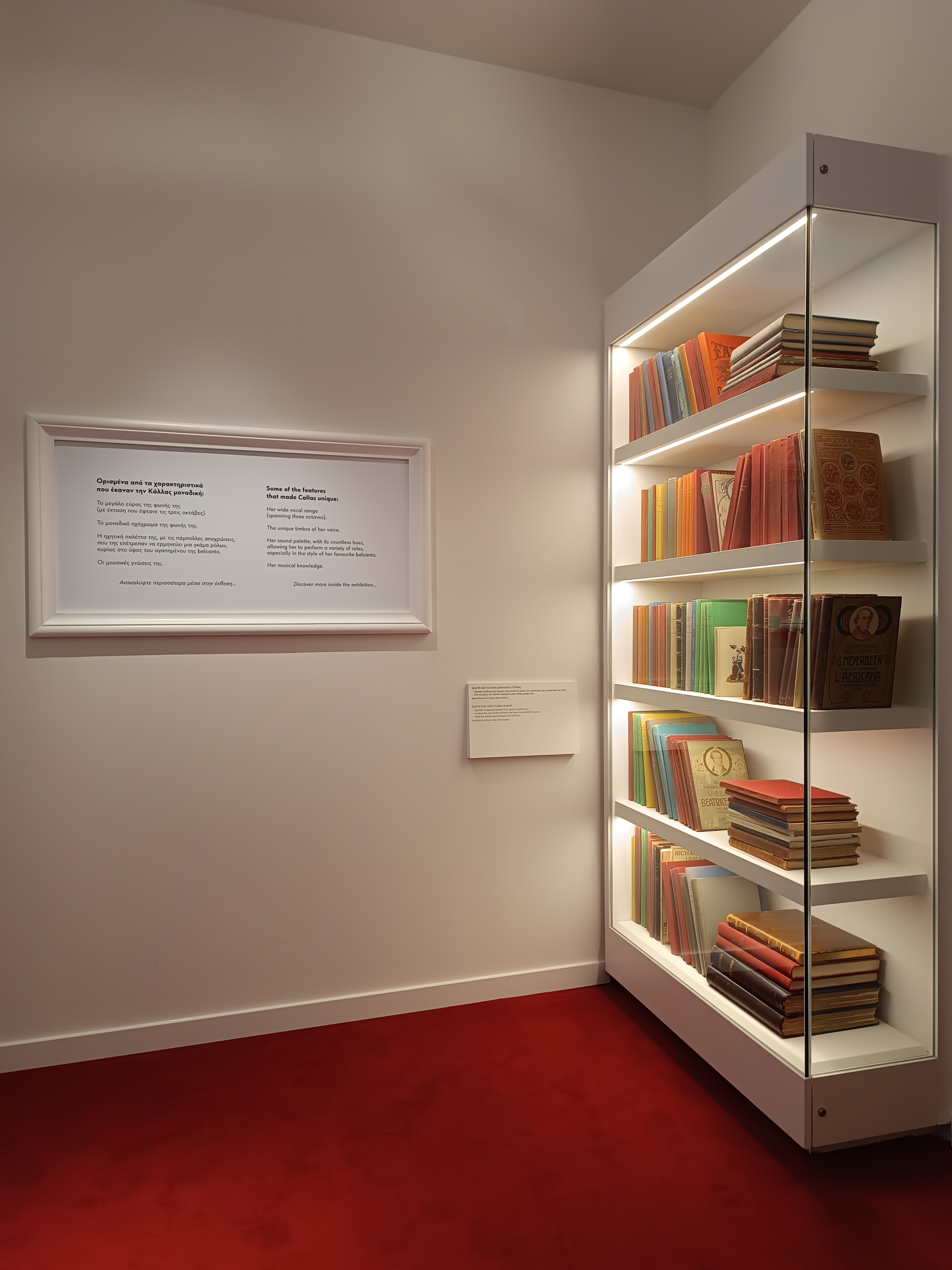
Piano–vocal scores used and annotated by Callas for practising opera roles

Callas' 1937 US school memory book from Public School (P.S.) 189 in Washington Heights, Manhattan

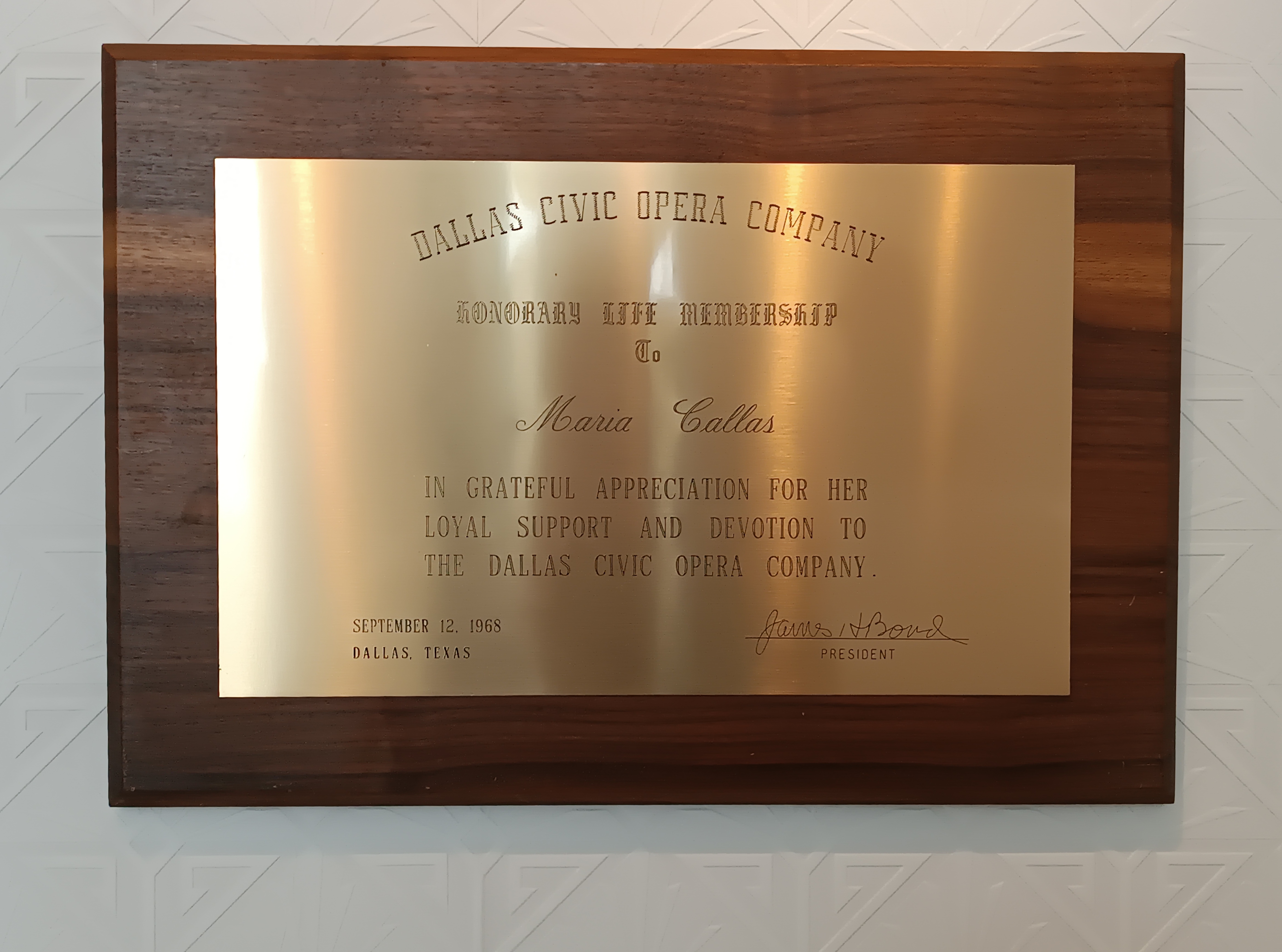
Plaque commemorating the awarding to Maria Callas of a life membership to the Dallas Civic Opera (today known as Dallas Opera); dated 12 September 1968
