= Marpessa Hennink =

20th and 21st-century Dutch model

- Born: 12 July 1964 (age 61); Amsterdam, Netherlands
- Years active: 1982–1997
- Children: 1
- Modeling information
- Height: 178 cm (5 ft 10 in)
- Hair color: Light brown
- Eye color: Green

Marpessa Hennink (born 12 July 1964) is a Dutch fashion model. One of the few models gaining recognition going by just her first name, she is best known for her distinguished walk and omnipresence as a runway model, which earned her the moniker “The Catwalk Contessa”.

== Early life ==
Hennink was born in Amsterdam, Netherlands to her Dutch mother and bi-racial Dutch / Surinamese father.

From as young as the age of four, Marpessa expressed her interest in fashion and began working as a model after she turned sixteen, having been discovered by a magazine editor in her native Amsterdam. This happened despite being rejected, deemed “too exotic” by the Eileen Ford agency during a casting call.

== Career ==
Amongst the many magazines that Hennink has been featured in are various international editions of Vogue, as well as other publications such as Elle, Glamour, Time, Vanity Fair, Marie Claire, L'Officiel, Harpers & Queen and Photo.

She credited the late fashion illustrator Antonio Lopez with recommending her to some of the prominent designers, such as Azzedine Alaia, and Karl Lagerfeld of the fashion house Chanel. Most notably, Hennink walked the runway for Dolce & Gabbana's first fashion show in 1985, at the beginning of their career as designers. The same year, she appeared in the music video for Bryan Ferry's song, "Slave to Love", directed by Jean-Baptiste Mondino.

Hennink went on to walk the runway for many other designers including Versace, Christian Lacroix, Valentino, Christian Dior, Gianfranco Ferré, Oscar de la Renta, Calvin Klein, Issey Miyake, Moschino, Claude Montana, Salvatore Ferragamo, Comme des Garçons, Lanvin, Thierry Mugler, Donna Karan, Trussardi, Mila Schön, Rifat Özbek, and Bruce Oldfield.

In 1987, Hennink was chosen by Dolce & Gabbana to star in the advertising campaign for their Fall/Winter collection. It was the first campaign for the label, and Hennink agreed to do it for free. The campaign was photographed in Sicily by Ferdinando Scianna of Magnum Photos. The photographs from the campaign made such an impression that Hennink came to be seen as an icon of Mediterranean femininity.

In October of that year, Hennink was named "Model of the Year" during the “Oscars de la Mode” in Paris. After which she was given the nickname "the Catwalk Contessa".

In 1993, after the publication of the book “Marpessa, uno sguardo”, by Ferdinando Scianna, Hennink retired from modeling, having also been put off by the arrival of the grunge fashion trend.

Upon her retirement, she moved to Ibiza, Spain, where she began a career as an interior decorator. She made a return to the fashion runways in 2004, where she closed the Fall/Winter show for designer Antonio Marras. In January 2011, Hennink was chosen to walk in a special fashion show held by designer Alberta Ferretti in Florence, Italy. Then, in May 2011, she walked in the "Fashion for Relief" benefit show in Cannes, France. The following year, Dolce & Gabbana launched a line of made-to-measure clothing called "Alta Moda", and chose Hennink as the global ambassador for that line.

== Personal life ==
Marpessa Hennink speaks six languages. In her spare time, she enjoys interior decorating and photography. She considers Inès de La Fressange, Diana Vreeland, and Madeleine Castaing as her style icons. In 2005, Marpessa gave birth to a daughter named Ariel.

In 2021, she was one of the guests at Lady Kitty Spencer's wedding.
