= Valentina Moncada =

Italian art historian, gallery owner, and curator

Valentina Moncada di Paternò (born December 1959 in Rome) is an Italian art historian, gallery owner, and curator who specializes in contemporary art. In 1990 she opened an art gallery in Rome in Via Margutta 54, establishing herself as a talent scout due to a program of young international artists who soon became known worldwide.

== Biography ==
Valentina Moncada is the daughter of fashion photographer Johnny Moncada and model Joan Whelan. In 1976 she left Rome at 17 years of age to study art history in New York where she obtained a B.A. at Sarah Lawrence College and an M.A. from New York University, Institute of Fine Arts. She was awarded the Hilla Von Rebay Fellowship at the Solomon R. Guggenheim Museum where she worked in the curatorial department. She then worked at the Metropolitan Museum of Art in the Community Education Department and became a Teacher Assistant to Professor Kenneth Silver at New York University. A work experience with New York-based, Italian gallery owner Annina Nosei marked a turning point in Moncada's career as she became acquainted with some of the leading personalities of the SoHo art scene of the 1980s, including Leo Castelli, Ileana Sonnabend and Jean-Michel Basquiat.

== The Valentina Moncada Gallery ==
In 1990 Moncada returned to Rome where she opened her own gallery. She organized the first exhibitions in Italy of artists such as Tony Cragg (1990), Christian Marclay (1992), James Turrell (2001) and Chen Zhen(1991) with a catalogue written by Carolyn Christov-Bakargiev. Moncada also worked on a special project with Anish Kapoor in Carrara (1992), and she curated group shows that included Damien Hirst (1993), Mona Hatoum (1994), Rachel Whiteread (1994) and Andy Goldsworthy (1999).

Moncada's keen interested in photography resulted in exhibitions on the work of Nan Goldin (1996, 2000, 2002, 2006), Gregory Crewdson (1996), Vincent Gallo (1999), Thomas Joshua Cooper (1999), Nobuyoshi Araki (2000, 2002), Thomas Ruff (2002), Matthew Pillsbury (2006), Mario Giacomelli (2006), Carlo Gavazzeni (2006, 2007, 2008, 2010, 2012) and also to historic photographers such as Jeanloup Sieff (2000), Lee Miller (2003), Robert Doisneau (2004), Alexander Rodchenko (2007). In 1996 she organized an exhibition of Gillian Wearing as well as the Video Art Festivals Play '04 (2004), Rec-Mode and Video Exchange (2008). She worked with the multimedia artist Donatella Landi several times between 1993 and 2009 and the Slovakian artist Petra Feriancová (2001, 2002, 2007, 2008, 2009), she exhibited the work of Donato Amstutz, a young Swiss artist who uses embroidery (2002, 2008, 2012).

In 2009 Moncada worked on the performance «mar'DEI guttAvi» of Luigi Ontani, a tribute to the artists of Via Margutta with papier masks exhibited in the gallery and later at the Museum of Contemporary Art in Rome.

In 2011 the twenty years anniversary of Moncada's gallery was celebrated with the exhibition Valentina Moncada_Odissea Contemporanea curated by Gianluca Marziani at Museo of Palazzo Collicola during the Festival dei 2Mondi in Spoleto, Italy (2011).

== Curatorial Projects ==
Outside of her gallery space, Moncada has curated many international exhibitions, including Theo by Richard Avedon at Musei Capitolini, Académie de France à Rome, Villa Medici (2009) Rome; Carlo Gavazzeni Ricordi Theater of Invention in Rome at The State Hermitage Museum, St. Petersburg, at MUAR - Shchusev State Museum of Architecture and Sotheby's Moscow (2012); Via Margutta Art Festival, Rome (2012);. In 2014 she co-curated with Antonio Monfreda the exhibition From Vera to Veruschka: The Unseen Photographs by Johnny Moncada at Somerset House, London, and then at MACRO - Museum of Contemporary Art of Rome; In 2014 she curated the exhibition Made in Italy: Una Visione Modernista. Johnny Moncada Gastone Novelli Achille Perilli with the collaboration of Ludovico Pratesi, at Museo Nazionale Etrusco di Villa Giulia, Rome. In 2017 she joined the scientific committee of the exhibition Picasso. Between Cubism and Classicism 1915 – 1925 curated by Olivier Berggruen with Princess Maria-Anunciata of Liechtenstein at the Scuderie del Quirinale, Rome.

Moncada is also the author of several publications, including :

- "The Painters Guild in the City of Venice and Padua", Harvard University Press, 1988
- "Marcel Duchamp. 11 Rue Larry 1927", L'Attico Editore, 1988, with a joint text by Robert Rosenblum
- "Picasso a Roma (Mon atelier de via Margutta 53/b)", Electa, Rome, 2007
- “Atelier a via Margutta. Cinque secoli di cultura internazionale a Roma”, Umberto Allemandi & Co., Turin, 2012
- Made in Italy. Una visione modernista. Johnny Moncada Gastone Novelli Achille Perilli. Fotografia - Moda - Arte - Design. Roma, 1956 - 1965, Silvana Editoriale, 2014
- Joan. Paris Haute Couture – Italia Alta Moda 1952 – 1967, Silvana Editoriale, 2015.

Moncada was also Chairman McKim Medal (2010–2014) and Trustee (2012–2014) of the American Academy in Rome.

== Personal life ==
Moncada is married to Luiz Fontes Williams. The couple has three children - Ginevra, Eduardo and Alexina. In 2012 Moncada founded the Johnny Moncada Archive with the support of the Nando Peretti Foundation.

== Bibliography ==
- Valentina Moncada (2001). Visioni/Visions. The first decade. Edizioni Charta, Milan.
- Valentina Moncada (2007). Picasso in Rome (Mon atelier de via Margutta 53/b). Electa, Rome.
- Valentina Moncada (2009). Theo by Richard Avedon. Alta Roma.
- Valentina Moncada (2009). Luigi Ontani: maschere d'artista e artisti in maschera in ONTANI "mar'DEI guttAvi" curated by R. Reale Meucci. Umberto Allemandi & C., Turin.
- Valentina Moncada (2011). Odissea Contemporanea in Valentina Moncada. Odissea Contemporanea. Cosmogonia vol. II curated by Gianluca Marziani, Palazzo Collicola Arti Visive, Spoleto.
- Valentina Moncada (2012). Carlo Gavazzeni Ricordi:in one day a traveler...' in Carlo Gavazzeni Ricordi –Teather of Invention in Rome, The State Hermitage Museum, St. Petersburg. Il Cigno GG Edizioni, Rome.
- Valentina Moncada (2012). Atelier a via Margutta. Cinque secoli di cultura internazionale a Roma. Allemandi & C., Turin.
- Valentina Moncada (2014). Made in Italy. Una visione modernista. Fotografia - Moda - Arte - Design. Roma, 1956 - 1965. Silvana Editoriale, Cinisello Balsamo (MI).
