= Domenico Dolce =

Italian fashion designer (born 1958)

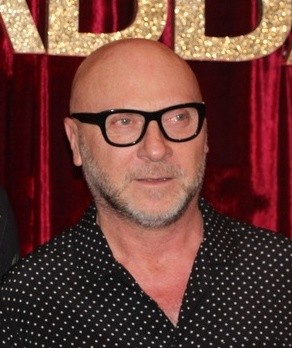
- Dolce in 2016
- Born: 13 August 1958 (age 68); Polizzi Generosa, Sicily, Italy
- Occupation: Fashion designer
- Known for: Dolce & Gabbana
- Partner: Stefano Gabbana (1982–2003)

Domenico Mario Assunto Dolce (Italian: [doˈmeːniko ˈdoltʃe]; born 13 August 1958) is an Italian fashion designer and entrepreneur who co-founded the luxury fashion house Dolce & Gabbana (D&G). Since the establishment of D&G in 1985, Dolce has gained recognition as a prominent fashion designer and an influential figure in the fashion industry.

== Early life and education ==
Dolce was born in Polizzi Generosa, in the province of Palermo, Sicily in 1958. He grew up with his father, Saverio, who ran a tailor's shop that he later converted into a furniture factory and his mother, Rosaria, who had a keen business sense. Dolce's interest in fashion started because of his father's frequent travels to Milan where he sourced fabrics and brought back fashion magazines.

Initially, Domenico studied architecture in Palermo but was drawn towards Milan's fashion schools. With support from his father, he eventually enrolled at the Instituto Marangoni in Milan, although he left before completing his degree, feeling confident in his abilities to work in the industry. His ambition at that time was to be employed by Armani.

== Career ==
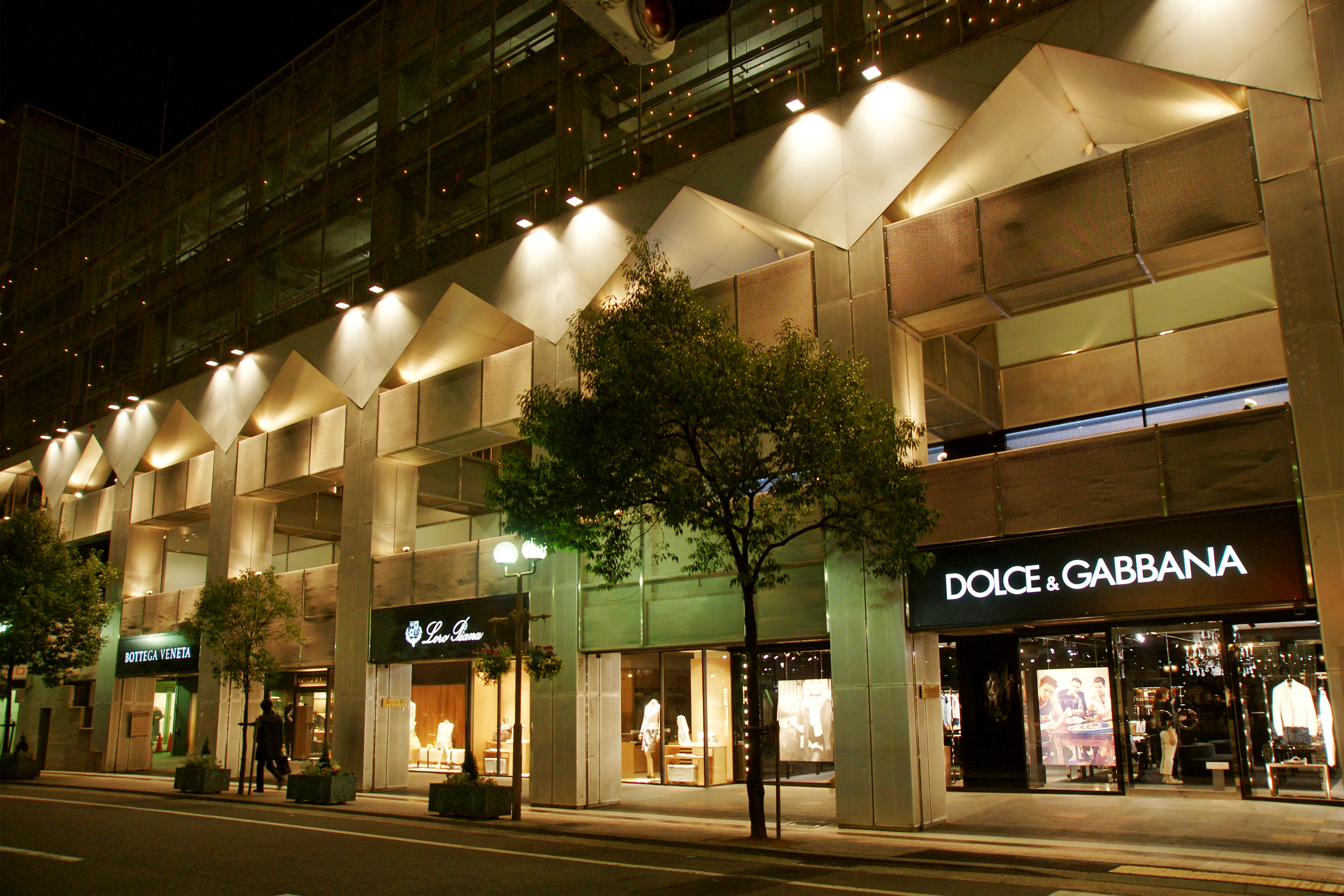
Dolce & Gabbana store in Kobe, Japan

Dolce began his career and gained practical experience helping in his family's businesses. In 1980, he met Stefano Gabbana. At the time, they were both working for designer Giorgio Correggiari. Initially, as the two shared the same office space, a professional rivalry developed, as Dolce feared that Gabbana might copy his ideas.

By 1982, Dolce and Gabbana founded a fashion consulting studio and two years later, they launched Dolce & Gabbana S.p.A. (D&G).

Dolce serves as the tailor within the partnership, responsible for drafting designs and developing prototypes. He takes an active role in ensuring the quality of each garment through a thorough fitting process. Additionally, it was Dolce's idea to engage photographer Ferdinando Scianna, a decision that enhanced D&G's brand presence among the Italian audience.

Before their official runway debut, Gabbana and Dolce organized grassroots fashion shows in unconventional locations around Milan, including a small apartment and even a fast-food restaurant. Using friends as models and without professional PR support, these presentations helped create enough buzz to secure their spot at Milano Collezioni.

D&G's initial women's collection was presented in Milan in 1985. This collection featured handcrafted designs with intricate fastening systems and drew inspiration from Italian actresses such as Sophia Loren and Anna Magnani. In March 1986, D&G presented its inaugural collection and organized its own show, titled "Real Women". The first D&G store opened in Milan at 7 Via Santa Cecilia in 1987. In 1988, D&G formed a partnership with Dolce's father, Saverio, who owned the manufacturing company Dolce Saverio in Legnano, near Milan.

D&G continued to expand; they partnered with the Kashiyama group, establishing their first boutique in Tokyo, Japan in 1989 and introducing a men's collection in 1991. In November 1990, D&G inaugurated its New York City showroom at 532 Broadway in SoHo, Manhattan. The brand released its first fragrance, Dolce & Gabbana Parfum, in October 1992.

In 1993, Dolce and Gabbana gained worldwide recognition when Madonna chose them to design the costumes for her Girlie Show World Tour. They have since created designs for notable personalities such as Monica Bellucci, Kylie Minogue, Angelina Jolie and Isabella Rossellini. From 1995 to 2004, Marcolin allowed Dolce & Gabbana to produce and distribute its eyewear and sunglasses.

Further additions to the D&G line included ties, belts, handbags, sunglasses, watches, and footwear. By 2003, the company had overtaken Armani, Gucci, Prada, and Versace in the domestic market in Italy. In 2009, approximately 25 years after D&G's establishment, the company operated 113 stores and 21 factory outlets, employing a staff of 3,500 individuals and achieving an annual turnover exceeding €1 billion.

Beginning in 2023, Dolce and Gabbana ventured into the real estate business, announcing two residential projects, one in Miami, USA and another in Marabella, Spain. They are also planning to build a hotel in Maldives. In June of that year, the brand announced a collaboration with Havaianas to create a sandal collection featuring signature prints like zebra, leopard, majolica-glazed pottery, and Sicilian cart patterns, crafted in a luxurious printed velvet finish.

== Personal life ==
Dolce and Gabbana publicly disclosed their relationship in 1999. They resided in a villa in Milan and owned multiple properties on the French Riviera, as well as a villa in Portofino. While their romantic relationship ended in 2004, they maintain a professional collaboration at D&G.

As of April 2024, Dolce has a net worth of approximately US$2.1 billion, according to Forbes.

== Philanthropy ==
In 2016, Dolce and Gabbana contributed to the Dynamo Camp 2016 charity event, which aims to assist in the treatment and care of children with chronic and terminal diseases. As part of their involvement, they created a special doll that was sold at an auction to raise funds for the event. Previously, they produced mini versions of their popular designs for a UNICEF charity project.

In 2020, Dolce and Gabbana launched the #Fattoincasa initiative, a series of online workshops designed to encourage individuals and families to engage in creative projects at home during the COVID-19 lockdowns. The initiative also aimed to raise funds for COVID-19 research, in addition to personal contribution from the two designers. Dolce & Gabbana provided financial support for a study coordinated by Prof. Alberto Mantovani, Scientific Director of Humanitas and emeritus professor of Humanitas University which aims to form the basis for developing diagnostic tools, such as biomarkers of the severity of the pathology, and therapeutic tools to help battle the strain of coronavirus.

Later in the same year, Dolce and Gabbana launched another campaign, the Devotion bag, with a portion of the proceeds dedicated to funding the second phase of research at Humanitas University. The research focused on vaccine development in the fight against COVID-19.

== Controversies ==
In 2013, both Domenico Dolce and Stefano Gabbana were convicted of tax evasion and sentenced to a 20-month suspended sentence in prison. An Italian court found the pair guilty of failing to declare millions of euros of revenue earned through a D&G subsidiary company, Gado, based in Luxembourg. They denied the charges and appealed the case; in October 2014, they were both cleared of wrongdoing by the appellate court.

In March 2015, Dolce's comments about in vitro fertilization (IVF) sparked a social media storm of criticism. In an interview with Panorama magazine, Dolce said, "I am gay. I cannot have a child. I believe you cannot have everything in life.... You are born from a father and a mother. Or at least that is how it should be. For this reason I am not convinced by what I call children of chemistry, or synthetic children. Uteruses for rent, sperm chosen from a catalogue." British singer-songwriter Elton John, who has children by IVF with his husband David Furnish, called for a boycott of the D&G brand. This sparked a war of words, with Gabbana later calling John a "fascist" and calling for a counter-boycott. He ended up apologizing for his remark.

== Honours ==
Dolce and Gabbana have received numerous honors in recognition of their contributions to the fashion and cultural spheres. Their initial fashion accolade came in 1991 when they were awarded the International Woolmark Prize. In 1993, their fragrance, Dolce & Gabbana Parfum, was named the Best Fragrance of the Year.

In 2009, the City of Milan presented them with the Ambrogino Gold medal. However, in 2014, they announced their intention to return the medal after a city council member accused them of being tax evaders.

The La Fondazione NY, a charity focused on supporting young Italian and American artists, honored Dolce, Gabbana, and film director Baz Luhrmann at its third awards gala at the Museum of the Moving Image in New York City in 2014.
