= Elvira Leonardi Bouyeure =

Italian fashion designer

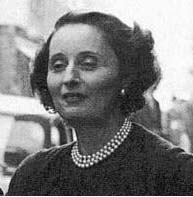
- Elvira Leonardi Bouyeure, 1950’s
- Born: 1 June 1906
- Died: 24 February 1999 (aged 92)
- Occupations: fashion designer and couturier
- Known for: Long-term stylist of Maria Callas
- Spouse: Robert Bouyeure
- Children: Roberta Bouyeure
- Relatives: Giacomo Puccini (step grandfather)

Elvira Leonardi Bouyeure (1 June 1906 – 24 February 1999), known professionally as Biki, was a notable Italian fashion designer and couturier of the post-war period based in Milan. Her clients were mainly connected to the La Scala opera, and she is known as the creator of the style for Maria Callas, whom she first met in 1951 at a dinner party organized by Wally Toscanini.

Bouyeure was a granddaughter of the composer Giacomo Puccini.

== Biography ==
Bouyeure was born in Milan on 1 June 1906. She studied at A. Manzoni linguistic school, where she also learned music and singing. Bouyeure travelled to Paris many times and decided to learn fashion. After a few years' apprenticeship, she created a line of French-style underwear named "Domina" (the name was proposed by the poet Gabriele D'Annunzio, who was a friend of the Puccini family).

On 5 May 1936, she opened her atelier in Milan on via Senato, catering mostly to La Scala opera singers. Her long-term cooperation with Maria Callas started in 1954.

Bouyeure designed a plain black evening cape in wool crepe for Callas that she wore for the 1970 opening of the Teatro alla Scala season in Milan, a paisley coat in 1971, and also a floor-length dress with silk satin collar which she wore in 1973 for the farewell concert at the Royal Festival Hall in London.

In 1967, Bouyeure worked with the Italian fashion photographer Johnny Moncada and in 1968 for the Linea Italiana magazine.

Her atelier was located in Via Monte Napoleone.

Bouyeure died on 24 February 1999.

== Personal life ==
The name Biki was given to Bouyeure as a child by her step-grandfather Puccini, who called her Bicchi (Italian "biricchina" meaning naughty girl). She married art expert Robert Bouyeure in 1936. They had a daughter named Roberta, born in 1937.
