= Light Blue (fragrance) =

Perfume by Olivier Cresp for Dolce & Gabbana

Fragrance by Dolce & Gabbana
- Released: 2001
- Label: Dolce & Gabbana

Light Blue Pour Homme

Fragrance by Dolce & Gabbana
- Released: 2007
- Label: Dolce & Gabbana

Light Blue Dreaming in Portofino

Fragrance by Dolce & Gabbana
- Released: 2012
- Label: Dolce & Gabbana

Light Blue Living Stromboli

Fragrance by Dolce & Gabbana
- Released: 2012
- Label: Dolce & Gabbana

Light Blue Escape to Panarea

Fragrance by Dolce & Gabbana
- Released: 2014
- Label: Dolce & Gabbana

Light Blue Discover Volcano Pour Homme

Fragrance by Dolce & Gabbana
- Released: 2014
- Label: Dolce & Gabbana

Light Blue Sunset in Salina

Fragrance by Dolce & Gabbana
- Released: 2015
- Label: Dolce & Gabbana

Light Blue Swimming in Lipari Pour Homme

Fragrance by Dolce & Gabbana
- Released: 2015
- Label: Dolce & Gabbana

Light Blue is a fragrance line by Italian fashion designers Dolce & Gabbana which was launched in 2001 and has won numerous fragrance-industry awards. The men's version (Light Blue Pour Homme) was released in 2007 and has also won awards, including the FiFi Awards in 2008.

Starting in 2012, limited-edition versions for women and men have been released periodically. These fragrances have been launched with photoshoots rather than with traditional advertising campaigns and have featured the same male and female models as the original scents.

== Background ==
The Italian design duo, Domenico Dolce and Stefano Gabbana, contracted with perfumer Olivier Cresp to develop a fragrance inspired by Sicily. The process took over two years to perfect and the women's fragrance was released in 2001.

== Original range ==
=== Light Blue ===
For the original fragrance for women, Cresp married a tart Granny Smith apple (synthetics cis-3 Hexenol, Liffarome and cis-3 hexenyl acetate) to Delta Muscenone (the scent of human skin). The fragrance includes three synthetic woods (Z11, Ambrox and Norlimbanol) as well as natural cedars. It contains approximately 15 percent of natural Sicilian lemon-peel essence. Top notes: Sicilian Cedar, apple, bluebell; middle notes: bamboo, jasmine, white rose; and base notes: Citron wood, amber and musk.

=== Light Blue Pour Homme ===
The men's fragrance was released in 2007 to immediate acclaim. It is characterized as a fresh classic balanced fragrance which is described as light-hearted, sparkling, and sophisticated. The fragrance is considered to be a woody spicy fragrance and consists of numerous notes including Sicilian Mandarin, frozen grape fruit peel, Russian pepper, rosemary, Sichuan pepper, rosewood, American musk wood, incense, and oak moss.

== Limited editions ==
=== Light Blue Dreaming in Portofino ===
A limited edition, released in 2012, this women's fragrance is named for the fishing village and resort of the rich and famous on the Italian Riviera. The notes include Citrus Accord, pink pepper, Crisp Aquatic, geranium, amber and patchouli.

=== Light Blue Living Stromboli ===
Named for the volcanic island, the limited edition men's fragrance (released in 2012) has received generally positive reviews. It has been described as a woody, aquatic scent that begins with notes of citruses and red pepper. The mid-notes include marine accords and geranium, while the base is composed of mossy vetiver, earthy patchouli, and amber.

=== Light Blue Escape To Panarea ===
Escape to Panarea is a 2014 limited edition women's fragrance inspired by the small island of Panarea that belongs to the Aeolian Islands. The island is a popular destination for international guests. The fragrance conveys the atmosphere and scents of the Aoles with accords pear and bergamot combined with night-blooming jasmine petals and a bouquet of orange blossom.

=== Light Blue Discover Volcano ===
Inspired by an exploding volcanic island, Discover Vulcano is a 2014 limited edition men's fragrance that belongs to the woody-chypre olfactive family. This fragrance opens with intense top notes of Italian lemon with ginger, followed by the grassy undertones of cypress and lavender. Haitian vetiver, cedar wood, and the musky-amber scent of ambrox blend to provide the base notes.

=== Light Blue Sunset in Salina ===
The 2015 limited edition floral fragrance was inspired by the Mediterranean summer and its clear blue waters. Sunset in Salina opens with fresh vines and bright violet leaves, followed by yellow freesia, orange flower and jasmine. The base combines amber, cedarwood and white musk.

=== Light Blue Swimming in Lipari ===
For 2015, the limited edition for men was inspired by the Aeolian Islands (off the coast of Sicily) that feature a rugged volcanic archipelago surrounded by crystal waters. The fragrance opens with hints of sea salt enhanced by grapefruit while the heart combines mandarin and rosemary. Dry woods, ambergris and musky notes end the composition.

== 25th anniversary relaunch ==
In 2025, Dolce & Gabbana celebrated the 25th anniversary of Light Blue by relaunching the fragrance line. The original Light Blue and Light Blue Pour Homme Eau de Toilette fragrances were reformulated by their original perfumers, Olivier Cresp and Alberto Morillas, with updated compositions designed to improve longevity while preserving their original olfactory identity. The bottles were also redesigned with updated packaging featuring reduced plastic components and new metallic details. The relaunch was accompanied by a new advertising campaign directed by Gordon von Steiner and filmed in Capri, starring Vittoria Ceretti and Theo James.

As part of the anniversary celebrations, Dolce & Gabbana also introduced Light Blue Capri In Love and Light Blue Capri In Love Pour Homme, two Eau de Parfum flankers inspired by the island of Capri.

In 2026, the company expanded the collection with Light Blue Eau de Parfum and Light Blue Pour Homme Eau de Parfum, new concentrations of the original fragrances created by Olivier Cresp and Alberto Morillas. While preserving the Mediterranean character of the Eau de Toilette editions, the Eau de Parfum versions introduced new compositions with greater intensity and longevity.

== Reception ==
In The New York Times in 2007, Light Blue for women earned a 5 (out of 5) star rating. In 2008, Light Blue for Men won the best men's fragrance as well as best new fragrance commercial at the FiFi Awards. As of 2012, the Light Blue fragrances had received fourteen awards. Light Blue was one of twelve fragrances selected for an exhibition entitled "The Art of Scent 1889-2012" curated by Chandler Burr, head of the Department of Olfactory Art of the Museum of Arts and Design. The Fragrance Foundation announced that both the male and female fragrances were in the top 7 selling fragrances for the first quarter of 2015.

External images
- Dolce & Gabbana Light Blue 2007 Fragrance Campaign
- Dolce & Gabbana Light Blue 2010 Fragrance Campaign
- Dolce & Gabbana Light Blue 2013 Fragrance Campaign

== Advertising ==
The initial advert for the fragrance was filmed in 2007 in Capri, Italy with models David Gandy and Marija Vujović wearing tiny white swimsuits and kissing on a raft. The voice is that of the French voice over actor Pierre Maubouché, who also voiced the subsequent TV commercials, also aired worldwide. According to British researchers, the advertisement is among the sexiest television adverts.

In 2010, the adverts featured Gandy with model Anna Jagodzińska. Instead of the raft, the models are seen in tiny white suits before swimming to shore where they embrace. Both versions of the advertisements were shot by fashion photographer Mario Testino in the waters off the island of Capri.

In May 2013, Dolce & Gabbana released their third version of the “Light Blue” fragrance campaign. Testino again filmed the commercials and adverts on location in Capri but this time with Italian model Bianca Balti in the female role opposite Gandy. In 2015, InStyle magazine included Light Blue as one of 'The 10 Hottest Perfume Campaigns'.

Balti and Gandy participated in a photoshoot in support of the 2015 limited versions with photographer Victor Demarchelier.

In 2025, Dolce & Gabbana launched a new advertising campaign to accompany the reformulation and relaunch of the Light Blue and Light Blue Pour Homme eau de toilette fragrances. Directed by Gordon von Steiner and filmed in Capri, the campaign featured Italian model Vittoria Ceretti and British actor Theo James, replacing Bianca Balti and David Gandy as the principal faces of the fragrance line. The campaign retained the Mediterranean setting and visual references associated with the earlier advertisements, including scenes filmed near the Faraglioni.
