= Johnny Moncada =

Italian fashion photographer

Johnny Moncada (1928 in Rome – 2011 in Rome) was an Italian fashion photographer.

== Biography ==
Johnny Moncada (Giovanni Luigi Moncada di Paternò), son of Conte Corrado Moncada dei Principi di Paternò, Sicilian aristocrat of Spanish descent and Teresa Patrizi, daughter of Marchese Giuseppe Patrizi and Francesca Lee Cooper, descendant from the Lees of Virginia.

His career began with advertising photography and took a definite path after meeting Joan Whelan, in 1954, an American model for Hubert de Givenchy who had just arrived in Rome to show Emilio Pucci clothes. They became inseparable and were married in 1956.

The photos of Johnny Moncada, a synthesis between art and fashion, capture the spirit of their time with great elegance and style. He worked with famous models of his time, Denise Sarrault from Paris, the legendary Veruschka, Barbara Bach, the wife of Ringo Starr, Ali MacGraw, the actress and wife of Steve McQueen, Jean Shrimpton, and the famous Italian models such as Isa Stoppi, Mirella Petteni and Iris Bianchi. He publishes with Linea Italiana, Harper's Bazaar UK, New York Times Magazine, The Tatler, Grazia, Novità, and others. He also works in advertisement for Vespa- Piaggio and Alitalia airlines. His studio became an important center for artists such as Gastone Novelli and Cy Twombly, and designers like Valentino, Mila Schön, Pino Lancetti, Irene Galitzine, Rocco Barocco, Sorelle Fontana, and many others. He works in Paris, London and New York City and travels worldwide for Alitalia. He closed his studio in 1970 and opened HG advertising agency in 1973, after having worked as creative advisor for Pgbs advertising.

In 2008 his daughter Valentina Moncada, who has run her own art gallery in Rome since 1990, founded the Johnny Moncada Archive.

In 2011, when Johnny Moncada died, the Nando Peretti Foundation is supporting the creation of the Archive.

In 2012 Valentina Moncada rendered homage to her father with a solo exhibition within the Via Margutta Art Festival, remembering his historic studio in Via Margutta 54.

In 2014 the exhibition From Vera to Veruschka. The Unseen Photographs by Johnny Moncada opened at Somerset House London, curated by Valentina Moncada and Antonio Monfreda, after launching the volume published by Rizzoli New York. In July 2014 the exhibition Made in Italy. Una Visione Modernista. Johnny Moncada Gastone Novelli Achille Perilli opened at Museo Nazionale Etrusco di Villa Giulia, Rome, curated by Valentina Moncada with the collaboration of Ludovico Pratesi, volume published by Silvana Editoriale. In November 2014 the exhibition From Vera to Veruschka opened at MACRO - Museum of Contemporary Art of Rome within the XIII Edition of FOTOGRAFIA - Festival Internazionale di Roma curated by Marco Delogu.

His photos were included in the exhibition Bellissima curated by Maria Luisa Frisa, Anna Mattirolo and Stefano Tonchi at Villa Reale in Monza (2016) and at NSU Art Museum Fort Lauderdale, Florida (2016). In 2017, his photos were exhibited in the occasion of Fantastica! Valentino Dresses from Private Collections at Milavida Museum in Tampere, Finland. In 2018 the exhibition Johnny Moncada. Zero Gravity opened at Moscow Manege in the XII International Month of Photography in Moscow organized by MAMM Multimedia Art Museum, Moscow.

== Bibliography ==
- Made in Italy. Una visione modernista. Johnny Moncada Gastone Novelli Achille Perilli. Fotografia - Moda - Arte - Design. Roma, 1956 - 1965, curated by Valentina Moncada. Silvana Editoriale. 2014.
- From Vera to Veruschka. The Unseen Photographs by Johnny Moncada, Art Direction by Antonio Monfreda, Contribution by Veruschka, Hamish Bowles, Franca Sozzani, Antonio Monfreda, Massimo di Forti and Valentina Moncada. Rizzoli New York. 2014.
- Massimo Di Forti. Moda e dolce vita: Johnny Moncada e la fotografia in Atelier a via Margutta. Cinque secoli di cultura internazionale a Roma curated by V. Moncada di Paternò. Umberto Allemandi & C.
