= Ferdinando Scianna =

Italian photographer (born 1943)

Ferdinando Scianna (born 4 July 1943) is an Italian photographer. Scianna won the Prix Nadar in 1966 and became a full member of Magnum Photos in 1989. He has produced numerous books.

== Career ==
Scianna took up photography while studying literature, philosophy and art history at the University of Palermo in the 1960s. He moved to Milan in 1966 and started working as a photographer for L'Europeo in 1967, becoming a journalist there in 1973. Scianna wrote on politics for Le Monde diplomatique and on literature and photography for La Quinzaine Littéraire. He first joined Magnum Photos in 1982, becoming a full member in 1989.

He took up fashion photography in the late 1980s. His first work, in 1987, was to photograph Marpessa Hennink for Dolce & Gabbana's advertising campaign for their Fall/Winter collection, clothing which was inspired by Sicily. 345tr

== Publications ==
=== Publications by Scianna ===
- Feste Religiose in Sicilia. Italy: Leonardo da Vinci Arte, 1965. With an essay by Leonardo Sciascia.
  - Palermo, Italy: L'Immagine Editrice, 1987.
- La villa dei mostri. Einaudi letteratura 55. Torino: G. Einaudi, 1977. OCLC 4439726.
- I Siciliani. Italy: Einaudi, 1977.
  - Les Siciliens.France: Editions Denoël, 1977.
- I Grandi Fotografi: Ferdinando Scianno. Milan: Gruppo Editoriale Fabbri, 1983.
- Il Grande Libro della Sicilia. Italy: Mandadori, 1984.
- Ferdinando Scianna: l'Istante e la Forma. Siracusa: Ediprint, 1987. OCLC 82374238.
- Città del Mondo. Italy: Bompiani, 1988.
- Kami. Italy: L’Immagine, 1988.
- Ore di Spagna. Spain: Pungitopo, 1988. With a text by Leonardo Sciascia.
  - Rome: Contrasto, 2016. ISBN 978-88-696-5668-2.
- Le Forme del Caos. Italy: Art & SRL, 1989. A retrospective.
- Leonardo Sciascia. Italy: Franco Sciardelli, 1989.
- Men and Trucks. Italy: Iveco, 1990.
- Marpessa. Italy: Leonardo Arte, 1993. Photographs of Marpessa Hennink.
  - French-language edition. Contrejour, 1993. ISBN 978-28-594-9150-5.
- Altrove: Reportage Di Moda. Italy: Federico Motta, 1995.
- Viaggio a Lourdes. Italy: Mondadori, 1996. About religious rituals.
- Dormire Forse Sognare. Tavagnacco, Italy: Artes Gráficas Friulane, 1997.
  - To Sleep, Perchance to Dream. London, New York City: Phaidon, 1997. ISBN 978-07-148-3719-2.
- Jorge Luis Borges. Italy: Franco Sciardelli, 1999. Portraits of Jorge Luis Borges.
- Niños del Mundo. Ayuntamiento De La Coruña, Spain, 1999
- Obiettivo Ambiguo. Italy: Rizzoli, 2001.
- Mondo Bambino. Italy: L'arte a stampa, 2002.
- Quelli di Bagheria. Lugano: Fondazione Galleria Gottardo, 2002. ISBN 978-88-864-5516-9. Text in English, Italian and Spanish. Photographs and writing on his home town of Bagheria in Sicily.
  - Italy: Peliti Associati, 2003
- Antonino Bencivinni, I Miei Volti Della Sicilia. Armando, 2006. ISBN 978-88-835-8890-7.
- Ferdinando Scianna. Actes Sud, 2008. ISBN 978-27-427-7217-9. Contrasto. ISBN 978-88-696-5100-7.
- Autoritratto di un Fotografo. Testi E Pretesti, 2011. ISBN 978-88-615-9618-4. Edited by Bruno Mondadori.
- Obiettivo Ambiguo. Rome: Contrasto, 2015. ISBN 978-88-696-5618-7.

=== Publications with contributions by Scianna ===
- Henri Cartier-Bresson: Ritratti. 1983. Milan: Gruppo Editoriale Fabbri. Photographs by Henri Cartier-Bresson. With a text by Scianna, "I Grandi Fotografi," and by André Pieyre de Mandiargues . Italian-language edition.
  - Henri Cartier-Bresson: Portraits. UK: Collins, 1984. English-language edition.
  - Spanish-language edition.

== Award ==
- 1966: Prix Nadar
