= Civico Liceo Linguistico Alessandro Manzoni =

Civico Liceo Linguistico Manzoni
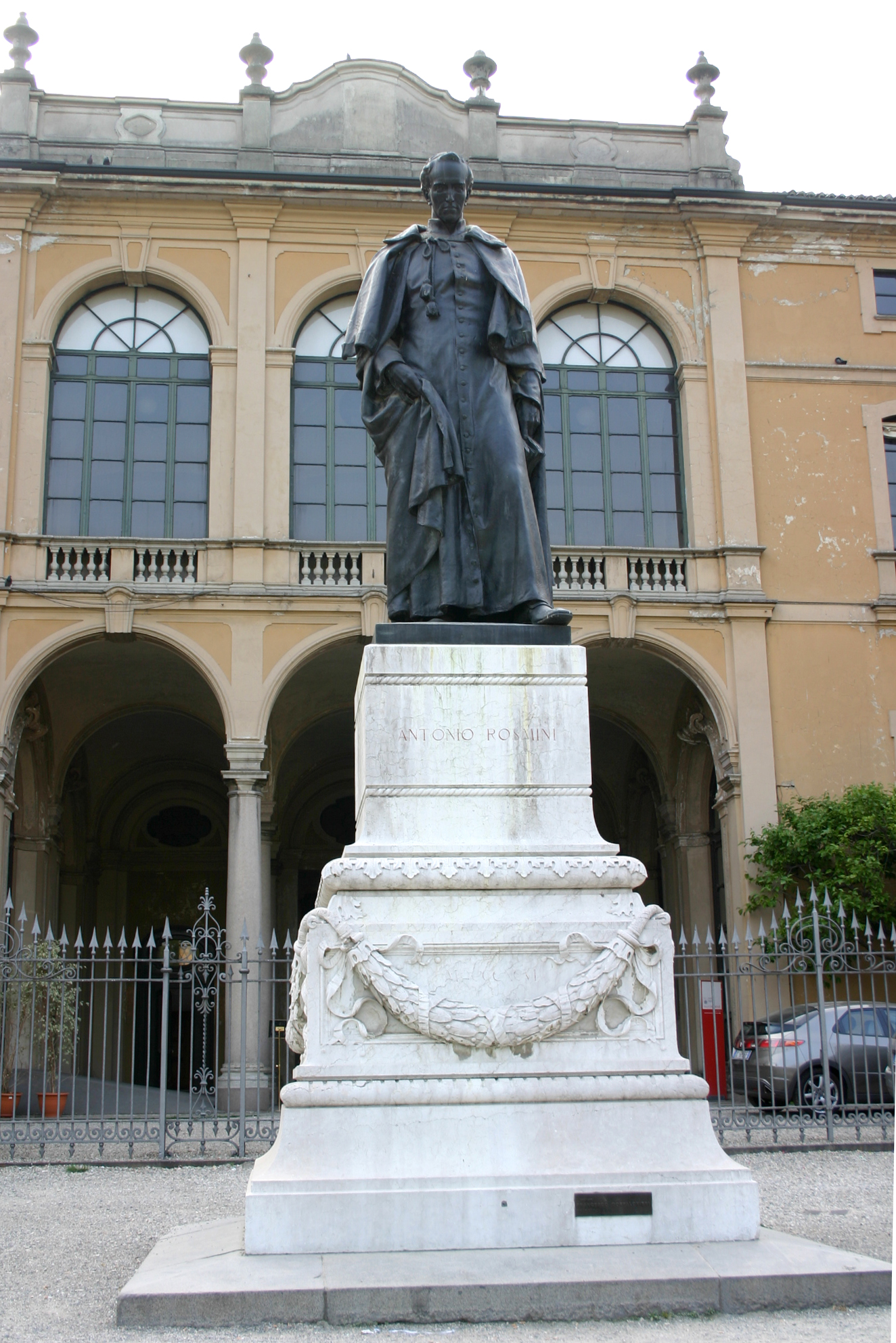
- Palazzo Dugnani, the historical location of the school
- Milan, Italy

Information
- School type: Independent Selective Day school
- Motto: La tradizione nell'innovazione (Tradition within innovation)
- Established: 1861; 165 years ago
- Founder: Carlo Tenca
- Headmaster: Maria Bernadette Rossi
- Gender: Co-educational
- Age range: 14-19
- Average class size: 27
- Website: www.lamanzoni.it

The Civico Liceo Linguistico Alessandro Manzoni is a high school in Milan, Italy. Founded in 1861 as an all-girls' school, it was renamed after poet and author Alessandro Manzoni in 1886. In 1978, the school began accepting boys.

Students are admitted through an entrance exam, typically held in December of their final year of middle school. In 2011, la Repubblica reported that 1,100 students applied for 250 available places. In 2013, Corriere della Sera reported a 6:1 applicant-to-place ratio.

The institute is a school run by the Milan municipal administration (Labor, Youth, and Sports Directorate, Labor and Training Area) and falls under the jurisdiction of the relevant department. The school is divided into two divisions: the linguistic high school and the Economic Technical Institute (ITE).
