= Eugenia Kim =

New York City-based accessories designer

Eugenia Kim is a New York City-based accessories designer best known for her line of hats.

== Background ==
Kim grew up in Pennsylvania and was the first child of parents who immigrated to the United States from Korea. She did well in science and math studies, and graduated from Dartmouth College in 1996 with a degree in Psychology. She considered becoming a doctor until deciding against it after a depressing month-long hospital stay due to an incident in which she broke her back while snow sledding on a golf course using a cafeteria tray.

== Career ==
She enrolled part-time at the Parsons School of Design, while also working at Allure Magazine. In 1998, after shaving her head in response to a bad haircut, she designed a feathery hat in order to conceal her head. She received compliments on her hat by several storeowners, among them Parker Posey. The owner of New York City boutique Bond 07 asked to see more of her hats, and this led to a deal to sell them. After Barneys New York ordered her hats, she decided to start her own business.

Kim opened her first retail store in the East Village of downtown New York in 1997. She collaborated with photographer David LaChapelle early in her career. She comes from a family of doctors who pressured her to become one as well, and "For the first six months, my parents absolutely didn't support me", she recalled in an interview in Marie Claire. Her hats can now be found in over 100 boutiques around the world, as well as high-end department stores such as Barneys New York, Bergdorf Goodman, Saks Fifth Avenue, and Neiman Marcus. She is regularly featured in fashion publications such as Vogue, W Magazine, ELLE, and Harper's Bazaar. Notable wearers of her hats include Beyoncé Knowles, Charlize Theron, Madonna, Gwen Stefani, Gwyneth Paltrow, Drew Barrymore, Diane Kruger, Dakota Fanning Sarah Jessica Parker, and Kirsten Dunst, although Kim says she rarely recognizes celebrities other than by name.

She develops her design ideas using Microsoft Excel rather than by illustration on paper or by using graphics software, because she says she can't draw. She cites Elsa Schiaparelli as a role model.

She won the Perry Ellis Award for Accessories Design from the Council of Fashion Designers of America after launching a shoe line in 2004.

Her book, Saturday Night Hat: Quick, Easy Hatmaking for the Downtown Girl, was published in 2006.

In 2009, she did a line called Eek! for Urban Outfitters. A year later in 2010, she debuted her limited-edition "Eugenia Kim for Target" hat line, which she says was inspired by "Old Cuba". Kim is the first milliner to design a collection for Target. Kim has also collaborated with Opening Ceremony and Coach.

In 2011, Eugenia Kim designed a fascinator for Princess Madeleine of Sweden, which was worn during the wedding of Albert II, Prince of Monaco and Charlene Wittstock in April 2011.
