= Stefano Gabbana =

Italian fashion designer (born 1962)

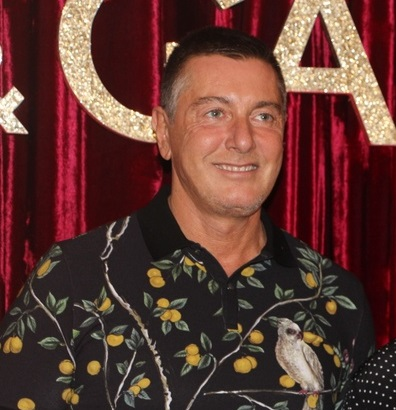
- Gabbana in 2016
- Born: 14 November 1962 (age 63); Milan, Lombardy, Italy
- Education: Istituto Superiore per le Industrie Artistiche
- Occupation: Fashion designer
- Known for: Dolce & Gabbana
- Partner: Domenico Dolce (1982–2003)

Stefano Gabbana (Italian pronunciation: [ˈsteːfano ɡabˈbaːna]; born 14 November 1962) is an Italian fashion designer and entrepreneur and the co-founder of the luxury fashion house Dolce & Gabbana.

== Early life ==
Stefano Gabbana was born in Milan on 14 November 1962 to a family from the Veneto region. His parents, Piera and Lino, respectively hailing from Ceggia and Cessalto, were hardworking laborers, often juggling two to three jobs. His interest in fashion began around age 15, in general for himself, particularly in designers like Fiorucci. Gabbana pursued graphic design, graduating from the Istituto Superiore per le Industrie Artistiche, in Rome.

== Career ==
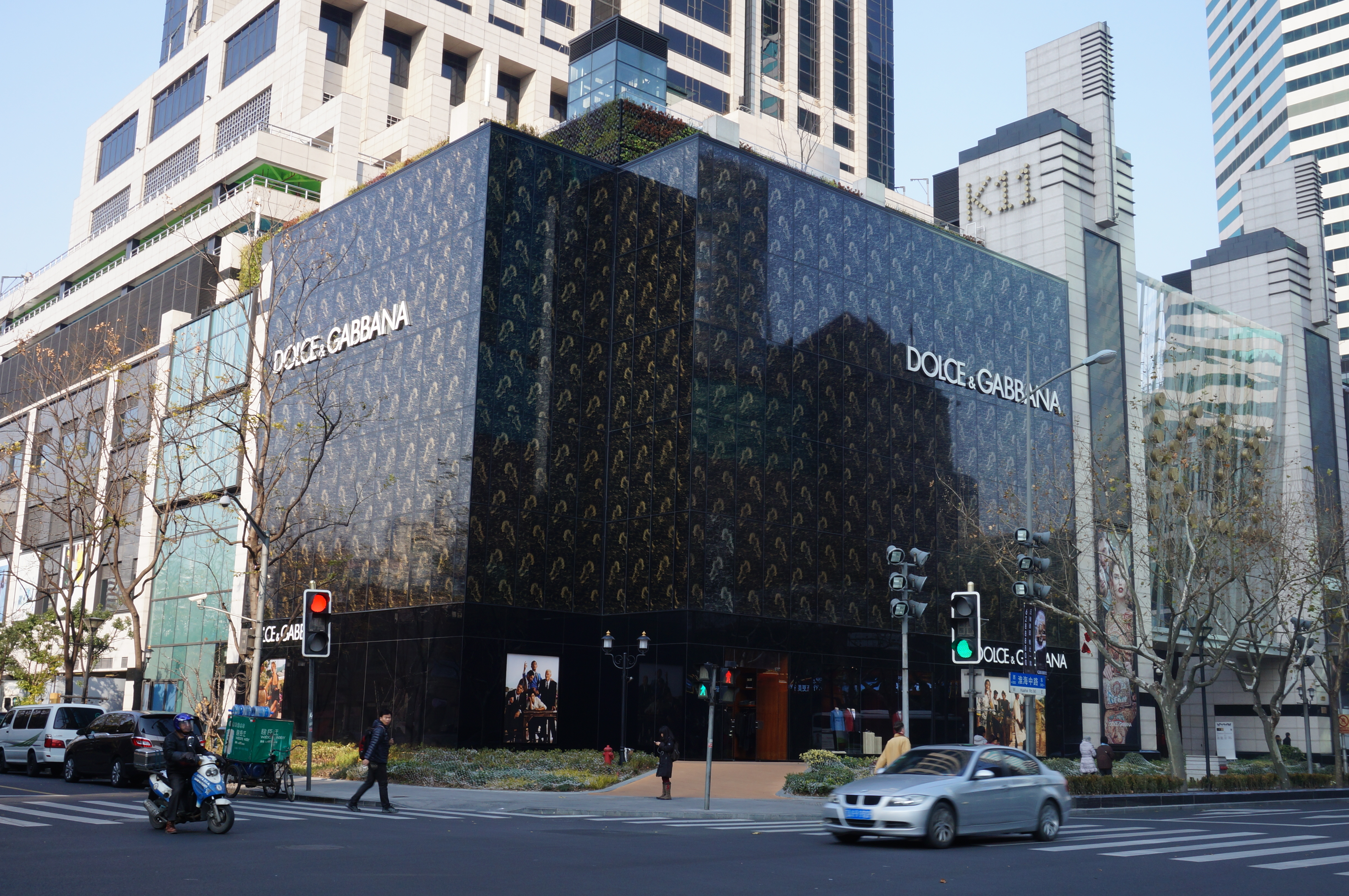
Dolce & Gabbana store in Shanghai

Gabbana's fashion journey began in 1980 when he met the Sicilian designer, Domenico Dolce, while working for Giorgio Correggiari. Hired by Correggiari with an emphasis on sportswear, Gabbana honed his skills in sketching and tailoring, often seeking guidance from Dolce.

Though Correggiari died in 2012, his impact on the young designers was profound. Gabbana, in a 2013 statement, acknowledged Correggiari's role in mentoring them, emphasizing the valuable lessons he imparted about pitfalls to avoid in the fashion industry.

In 1983, Gabbana and Dolce decided to venture out on their own, and two years later, they established Dolce & Gabbana S.p.A. (D&G). Within this partnership, Dolce handles most of the tailoring while Gabbana assists in fabric selection and the overall feel of the collection. Gabbana's main role comes during fittings where he judges the final look.

Before their official runway debut, Gabbana and Dolce organized grassroots fashion shows in unconventional locations around Milan, including a small apartment and even a fast-food restaurant. Using friends as models and without professional PR support, these presentations helped create enough buzz to secure their spot at Milano Collezioni.

The fashion brand made its debut on the runway in October 1985 at the Nuovi Talenti (New Talents) show during Milano Collezioni. In March 1986, D&G launched its first collection and presented its own show titled "Real Women." The first D&G store opened in Milan at 7 Via Santa Cecilia in 1987. In 1988, D&G formed a partnership with Dolce's father, Saverio, who owned the manufacturing company Dolce Saverio in Legnano, near Milan.

D&G's repertoire expanded, unveiling lingerie and beachwear in 1989, followed by menswear in 1990. Their global presence solidified with fashion shows in Tokyo and New York in 1989 and 1990, respectively. In November 1990, D&G inaugurated its New York City showroom at 532 Broadway in SoHo, Manhattan. The brand released its first fragrance, Dolce & Gabbana Parfum, in October 1992.

Dolce & Gabbana gained worldwide recognition in 1993 when Madonna selected them to design costumes for her Girlie Show World Tour. Subsequently, they went on to collaborate with notable personalities such as Monica Bellucci, Kylie Minogue, Angelina Jolie and Isabella Rossellini. By 1995, the brand secured an agreement to produce and distribute Marcolin's eyewear and sunglasses.

The D&G product line expanded to include various accessories such as ties, belts, handbags, sunglasses, watches, and footwear. By 2003, the company had overtaken Armani, Gucci, Prada, and Versace in terms of product sales within Italy. In 2009, nearly a quarter-century after its establishment, D&G operated 113 stores and 21 factory outlets, employed a staff of 3,500 individuals, and achieved an annual turnover exceeding €1 billion.

In 2023, the duo diversified into real estate, announcing residential projects in Miami, USA, and Marabella, Spain, and expressing ambitions to establish a hotel in the Maldives. In June of that year, Gabbana and Dolce announced they will collaborate with Havaianas to venture into making a sandal collection featuring signature prints like zebra, leopard, majolica-glazed pottery, and Sicilian cart patterns, crafted in a luxurious printed velvet finish.

Gabbana announced his retirement as chair in April 2026, but stated that he would remain with the company in a creative role.

== Personal life ==
Gabbana and Dolce publicly disclosed their relationship in 1999. They resided in a villa in Milan and owned multiple properties on the French Riviera, as well as a villa in Portofino. While their romantic relationship ended in 2004, they maintain a professional collaboration at D&G.

As of April 2024, Forbes estimates Stefano Gabbana's net worth to be around US$2.1 billion.

== Legal troubles ==
In 2013, both Stefano Gabbana and Domenico Dolce were convicted of tax evasion and sentenced to a 20-month suspended sentence in prison. An Italian court found the pair guilty of failing to declare millions of euros of revenue earned through a D&G subsidiary company, Gado, based in Luxembourg. They denied the charges and appealed the case; in October 2014 they were both cleared of wrongdoing by the appellate court.

=== IVF position ===
In March 2015, singer-songwriter Elton John called for a boycott of the D&G brand after Dolce referred to babies born through in vitro fertilization as "chemistry children and synthetic children" in an interview. This sparked a war of words, with Gabbana later calling John a "fascist" and calling for a counter-boycott. However, he later clarified that his views on IVF were separate from that of Dolce. When asked on CNN whether he supported IVF, he responded: "Yeah, I don't have anything bad (to say), because the beauty of the world is freedom" and "We love gay couple. We are gay. We love gay couple. We love gay adoption. We love everything. It's just an express of my private point of view."

=== China-related comments on Instagram ===
On 21 November 2018, Gabbana was publicly exposed on Instagram for making racist comments regarding China, including "China ignorant dirty smelling mafia" and calling China "a shitty country". The Shanghai D&G Great Show 2018 was cancelled because of the commercials and his comments. Dolce & Gabbana said the account was hacked and it loved China and its culture. On 1 December, Dolce & Gabbana deleted the apology video on Weibo.

== Advocacy and philanthropy ==
Gabbana is a staunch advocate for preserving Italian craftsmanship. He believes that traditional artisans deserve more recognition and support, especially considering the global esteem for Italian workmanship.

In 2016, Dolce & Gabbana contributed to the Dynamo Camp 2016 charity event, which aims to assist in the treatment and care of children with chronic and terminal diseases. As part of their involvement, they created a special doll that was auctioned to raise funds for the event. Previously, they produced mini versions of their popular designs for a UNICEF charity project.

In 2020, Dolce & Gabbana launched the #Fattoincasa initiative, a series of online workshops designed to encourage individuals and families to engage in creative projects at home during the COVID-19 lockdowns. The initiative also aimed to raise funds for COVID-19 research, in addition to personal contribution from the two designers. Dolce & Gabbana provided financial support for study coordinated by Prof. Alberto Mantovani, Scientific Director of Humanitas and emeritus Professor of Humanitas University which aims to form the basis for developing diagnostic tools, such as biomarkers of the severity of the pathology, and therapeutic tools to help battle the strain of coronavirus.

Later in the same year, Dolce & Gabbana launched another campaign, the Devotion bag, with a portion of the proceeds dedicated to funding the second phase of research at Humanitas University. The research focused on vaccine development in the fight against COVID-19.

== Honours ==
Gabbana and Dolce have received numerous recognitions for their contributions to the fashion industry and culture. They were awarded the International Woolmark Prize in 1991. In 1993, their fragrance Dolce & Gabbana Parfum was named Best Fragrance of the Year.

In 2009, the City of Milan honored them with the Ambrogino Gold medal. However, in 2014, they announced their intention to return the medal following accusations of tax evasion made by a city council member. In 2014 as well, Gabbana and Dolce, together with Baz Luhrmann, were honored by La Fondazione NY, a charity supporting young Italian and American artists, during its awards gala in New York City. Gabbana expressed his affinity for movies during the event, stating, "We live with movies - our inspiration all the time is movies, and we make our collection like a movie."

== Film and television ==
Gabbana appears in the 2013 documentary, Scatter My Ashes at Bergdorf's, which explored the fashion industry. He made a cameo appearance in Woody Allen's film To Rome with Love in 2012, and served as a presenter at the MTV Europe Music Awards in 2002. Gabbana also had a role in Giuseppe Tornatore's 1995 movie The Star Maker (L'Uomo delle stelle in Italian).
