= Heavens to Betsey! =

- RuPaul's Drag Race episode
- Episode no.: Season 17; Episode 9
- Presented by: RuPaul
- Original air date: February 28, 2025

Guest appearance
- Betsey Johnson

Episode chronology
← Previous "The Wicked Wiz of Oz: The Rusical!"	Next → "The Villains Roast"
- RuPaul's Drag Race season 17

"Heavens to Betsey!" is the ninth episode of the seventeenth season of the American television series RuPaul's Drag Race. It originally aired on February 28, 2025. The episode's main challenge tasks contestants with creating original outfits inspired by American fashion designer and guest judge Betsey Johnson. Jewels Sparkles wins the main challenge. Kori King is eliminated from the competition after placing in the bottom two and losing a lip-sync contest against Lydia B Kollins to "Kiss Me Deadly" by Lita Ford.

== Episode ==
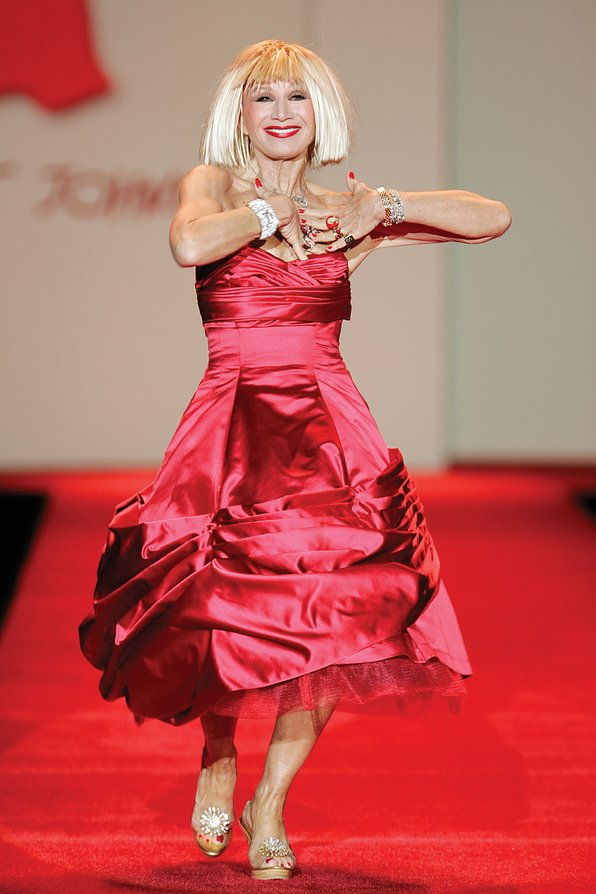
Betsey Johnson (pictured in 2007) is a guest judge.

The contestants return to the Werk Room after the elimination of Acacia Forgot on the previous episode. On a new day, RuPaul greets the group and reveals the mini-challenge, which tasks contestants with "reading" (or playfully insulting) each other. Suzie Toot is declared the winner of the mini-challenge.

RuPaul then introduces the main challenge, which tasks contestants with creating original outfits inspired by fashion designer Betsey Johnson. There are three style collections with materials for contestants to use. For winning the mini-challenge, Suzie Toot gets to choose first, then decide which contestant can choose next. The contestants continue to self-select collections in this manner.

The contestants gather materials from the collections and begin designing outfits. Many contestants proceed with confidence, but Lexi Love struggles to find inspiration. Sam Star offers support to her. RuPaul greets the contestants in the Werk Room and introduces Johnson; the two meet with contestants in groups by collection and offer feedback. During final preparations for the runway show, the contestants ask Kori King and Lydia B Kollins about their relationship.

On the main stage, RuPaul welcomes fellow panelists Michelle Visage and Carson Kressley, as well as guest judge Johnson. The contestants showcase their designs in a runway show with three categories based on the style collections. RuPaul dismisses the safe contestants, who exit the stage. The judges deliver their critiques to the top and bottom contestants, then deliberate without the contestants present.

The contestants return and RuPaul shares the results. Jewels Sparkles is deemed the challenge winner, earning her a cash tip prize of $5,000. Kori King and Lydia B Kollins place in the bottom two and face off in a lip-sync contest to "Kiss Me Deadly" (1988) by American musician Lita Ford, during which they share a kiss. Lydia B Kollins wins the lip-sync and Kori King is eliminated from the competition. She returns to the Werk Room to leave a message for the remaining contestants.

== Production and broadcast ==
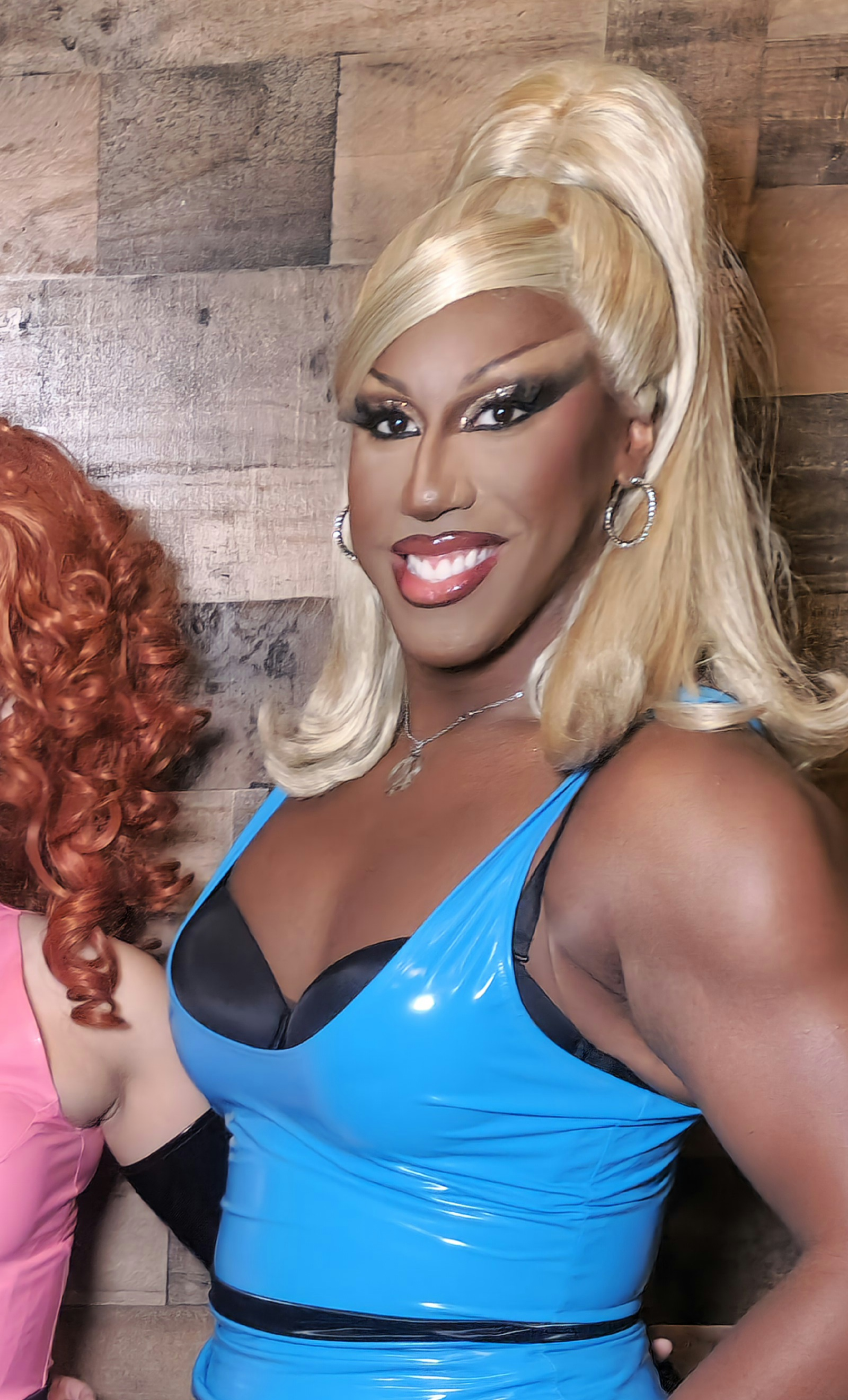
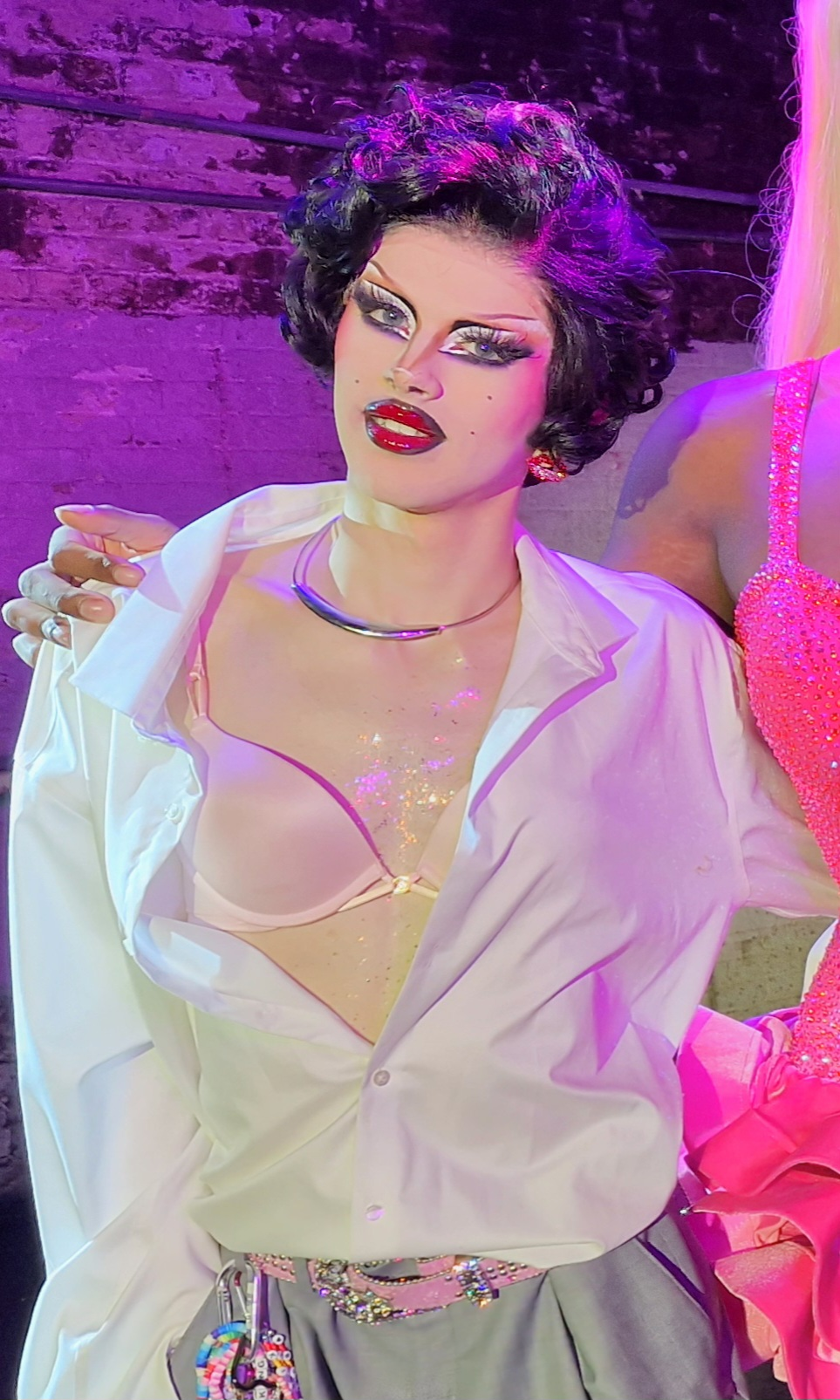
Kori King (left), who is eliminated from the competition, and Lydia B Kollins (right) share a kiss during the lip-sync contest.

The episode originally aired on February 28, 2025.

Previously, Johnson was a guest judge on the seventh episode of the seventh season of RuPaul's Drag Race All Stars. A celebration party for Johson at a venue on Santa Monica Boulevard featured a live airing of the episode.

The kiss between Kori King and Lydia B Kollins was their first. In an interview with Out South Florida, Lydia B Kollins said of the exchange: "You know, a lot of it came from my own nervousness. I was just like 'No, we can't kiss, what do you mean?' Then it just came down to the moment and it was like 'Well it's gonna be now or never, one of us is gonna go home so we should just do it.' Then the song and everything, it just made sense." Kori King told Vulture, "It was very spur of the moment. We kind of read the room, you know what I mean? We saw each other, like — okay, the song is called 'Kiss Me Deadly,' girl. It was very much a feel-the-vibes type of thing. I wasn't surprised. It felt right." Kori King has said she would have saved Lydia B Kollins from elimination if she had won the lip-sync contest.

=== Fashion ===
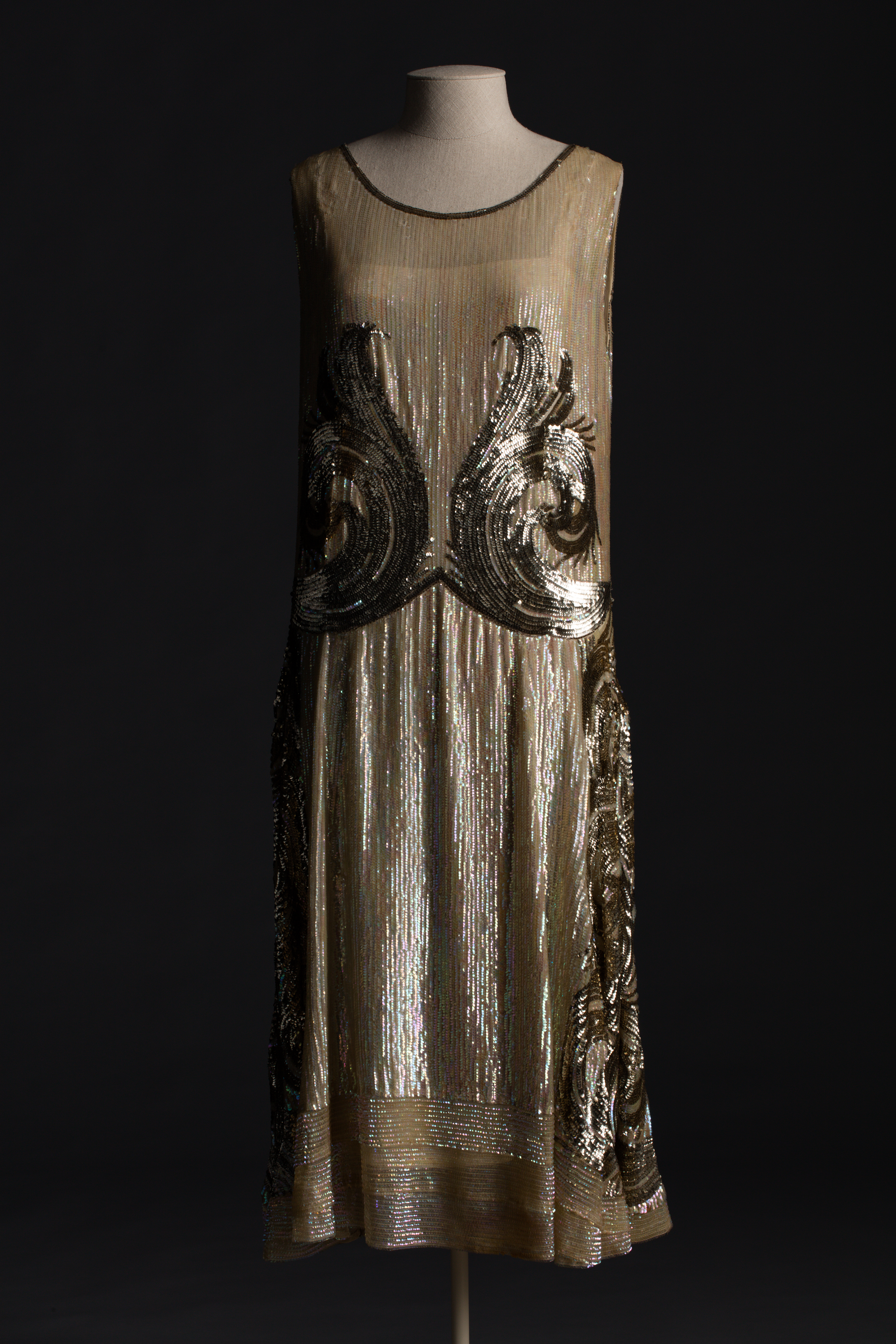
During the fashion show, Lydia B Kollins wears a flapper (pictured is an example in the collection of the Auckland War Memorial Museum.)

For the first runway category ("Punk Grunge Flappers"), Jewels Sparkles shows a purple dress with different patterns of fur. Lydia B Kollins wears a deconstructed flapper. Suzie Toot has a squirrel attached to her shoulder.

For the category "Betsey's Prom", Kori King wears a pink dress and a blonde wig. Onya Nurve's dress has multiple bows and she wears a choker and a corsage. The back of Lana Ja'Rae's outfit has a large bow.

For the category "Prenup" (prenuptial), Arrietty shows a black dress with appliqués and stones. She also wears a white bow tie. Sam Star wears a black-and-white outfit and sunglasses. Lexi Love's outfit has a large veil and she carries a flower bouquet. She has multi-colored hair and wears a bow on the top of her head.

== Reception ==
Jason P. Frank of Vulture rated the episode three out of five stars. Stephen Daw ranked "Kiss Me Deadly" number 8 on Billboard's list of the season's lip-syncs, writing: "You know the producers were chomping at the bit to put Lydia and Kori in the bottom together — but to have it happen when this was the song feels like the stars aligning. The lovebirds of season 17 took similar approaches to this '80s banger, both amping up the pure, unabashed camp antics of the track with their over the top performances." Daw opined, "Whether it was Kori pointing directly at RuPaul for the line 'had to borrow 10 bucks from my old man' or Lydia's unhinged face during the climactic chorus, these queens brought their A-game to this performance. But it was when they locked eyes, moved in close and made out on national television that the deal was sealed — the 'Kiss Me Deadly' lip sync was one for the books, and easily one of the best of the season."
