= RDR Live! (RuPaul's Drag Race season 17) =

- RuPaul's Drag Race episode
- Episode no.: Season 17; Episode 5
- Presented by: RuPaul
- Original air date: January 31, 2025

Guest appearance
- Paul W. Downs

Episode chronology
← Previous "Bitch, I'm a Drag Queen!"	Next → "Let's Get Sea Sickening Ball"
- RuPaul's Drag Race season 17

"RDR Live!" is the fifth episode of the seventeenth season of the American television series RuPaul's Drag Race. It originally aired on January 31, 2025. The episode's main challenge tasks contestants with performing in the sketch comedy show RDR Live! Ross Mathews and Michelle Visage join RuPaul on the judging panel and Paul W. Downs is a guest judge.

Suzie Toot wins the episode's main challenge. Arrietty and Lydia B Kollins place in the bottom two and face-off in a lip-sync contest to "Boogie Wonderland" by Earth, Wind & Fire. Lydia B Kollins wins the lip-sync, but Arrietty is saved from elimination after successfully choosing a correct lever to drop Visage into a dunk tank.

== Episode ==
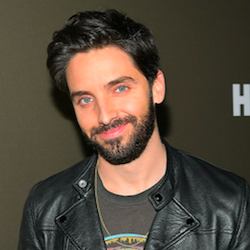
Paul W. Downs (pictured in 2018) is a guest judge.

The contestants return to the Werk Room after Joella's elimination on the competition on the previous episode. On a new day, RuPaul greets the group and reveals the main challenge, which tasks contestants with performing in the sketch comedy show RDR Live! The contestants read the script together and choose the following roles:

- Acacia Forgot as an emergency room visitor
- Arrietty as a Neanderthal
- Crystal Envy as a news presenter
- Hormona Lisa as a podcaster
- Kori King as a Neanderthal
- Jewels Sparkles as a podcaster
- Lana Ja'Rae as a "homo"-sapien
- Lydia B Kollins as Gert
- Onya Nurve as the show's host and a Neanderthal
- Lexi Love as a news presenter
- Sam Star as Ellen the lesbian podcaster
- Suzie Toot as Rhonda

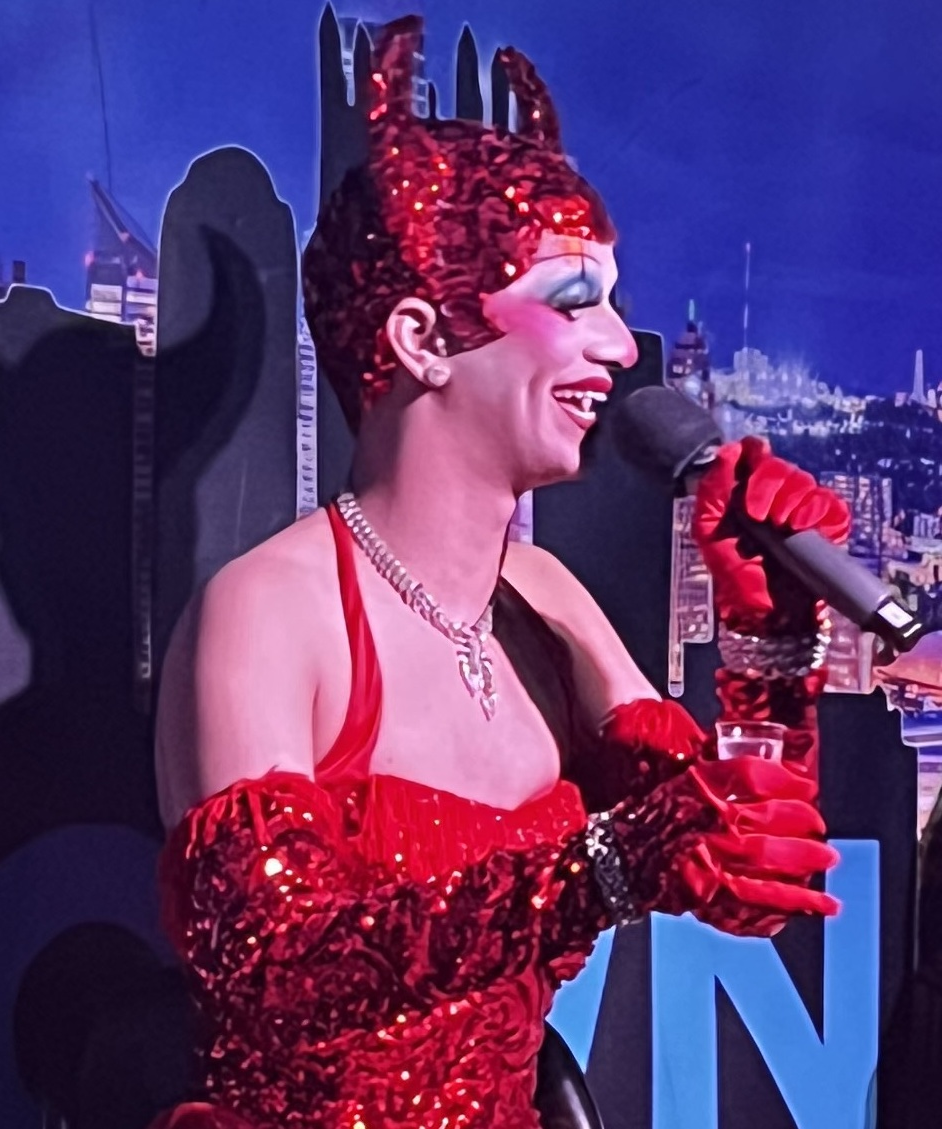
Suzie Toot (pictured in 2025) wins the episode's main challenge.

The contestants get into groups and begin collaborating. Crystal Envy, Lexi Love, and Suzie Toot have the Weekend Update-inspired Queen News Network (QNN) sketch. Hormona Lisa, Jewels Sparkles, and Sam Star have the Beaverologst sketch. Arrietty, Kori King, Lana Ja'Rae, and Onya Nurve have the Neanderthal sketch. Acacia Forgot and Lydia B Kollins have the Emergency Room sketch. The latter's character is inspired by Sophia Petrillo of The Golden Girls.

After the Neanderthal sketch, Onya Nurve welcomes viewers as host. After the Beaverologst sketch, RuPaul performs a song on the main stage. The QNN and Emergency Room sketches follow, with guest judge Paul W. Downs appearing in the latter. The contestants appear on the stage together and Onya Nurve closes the show. Back in the Werk Room, the contestants discuss their sketches and prepare for the runway. Lexi Love discusses her work life and experience as a trans woman.

On the main stage, RuPaul welcomes fellow panelists Michelle Visage and Ross Mathews, as well as Downs. For the runway, the category is "Tickled Pink". Following the runway show, RuPaul dismisses the safe contestants and the judges share their critiques to the top and bottom contestants. The contestants return to the Werk Room and the judges deliberate. Suzie Toot is declared the winner of the main challenge, earning her $5,000. Arrietty and Lydia B Kollins placed in the bottom two and face-off in a lip-sync contest to "Boogie Wonderland" (1979) by Earth, Wind & Fire. Lydia B Kollins is declared the winner of the lip-sync. Arrietty selects a correct lever to drop Visage into a dunk tank, sparing Arrietty from elimination from the competition and earning a trip to Las Vegas.

== Production ==
The episode originally aired on January 31, 2025. It was the season's third episode to not see a contestant eliminated.

=== Fashion ===
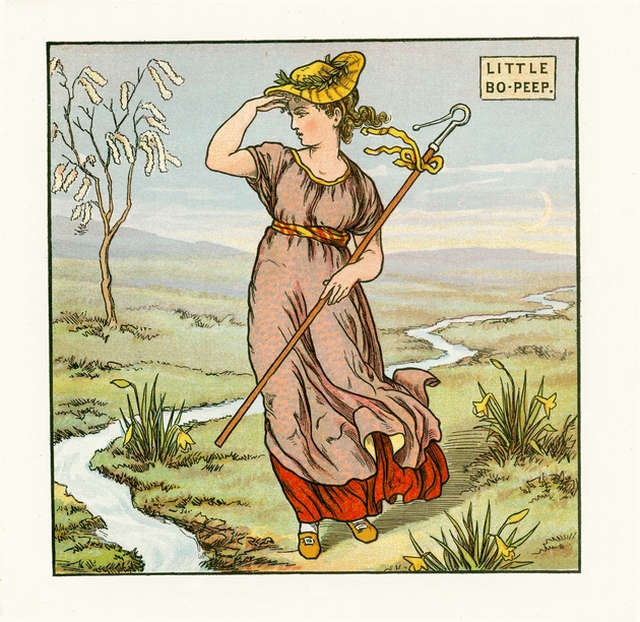
For the fashion show, Lana Ja'Rae wears a look inspired by Little Bo-Peep (pictured is a scanned page from the 1878 edition of The Baby's Opera by Walter Crane).

The contestants wear pink outfits for the fashion show. Onya Nurve's outfit is made of sneakers. Kori King has a Barbie-inspired dress and a blonde wig. Arrietty's outfit is made of vinyl. Lana Ja'Rae has a Little Bo-Peep-inspired look. Hormona Lisa wears a full-length gown and Sam Star resembles a showgirl. Jewels Sparkles wears a large hat and bell-bottoms. Crystal Envy's silicon outfit resembles bubble gum. Lexi Love wears animal print. Suzie Toot's outfit is inspired by clowns and Harlequin. Lydia B Kollins's outfit resembles a penis. Acacia Forgot has a 1980s-inspired executive look.

== Reception ==
Jason P. Frank of Vulture rated the episode four out of five stars. Jordan Robledo of Gay Times described the "Boogie Wonderland" lip-sync as "passionate" and "filled with dips, turns and comedy". Stephen Daw ranked the performance second in Billboard's list of the season's lip-syncs, writing: "There is a moment in the “Boogie Wonderland” lip sync where something magical happens. As Arrietty flails her limbs in the background like an inflatable tube person outside a car dealership, Lydia “Butthole” Kollins starts popping her knees to the beat. RuPaul, mouthing along every word with her, makes sustained eye contact with Lydia, as the queen grins, spins away and drops to the floor. THIS. IS. EXCELLENT. DRAG." Daw continued, "Lydia didn’t enter this Earth, Wind & Fire performance with a set plan in mind, she simply let the boogie beats move through her body as she delivered one of the most impressively spontaneous numbers of the whole season. Sometimes, the best lip syncs are the ones with a clear, undisputed winner, and that is very much the case here — Lydia mopped the floor with Arrietty and her little shuffle dance, exhibiting exactly the skills it takes to dominate a lip sync on RuPaul’s Drag Race."
