= Ross Mathews vs. The Ducks =

- RuPaul's Drag Race episode
- Episode no.: Season 17; Episode 11
- Presented by: RuPaul
- Original air date: March 14, 2025

Guest appearances
- Sam Smith (guest judge); Cheyenne Jackson

Episode chronology
← Previous "The Villains Roast"	Next → "Charisma, Uniqueness, Nerve & Talent Monologues"
- RuPaul's Drag Race season 17

"Ross Mathews vs. The Ducks" is the eleventh episode of the seventeenth season of the American television series RuPaul's Drag Race. It originally aired on March 14, 2025. Ross Mathews participates in the episode's main challenge, which tasks contestants with acting in a sketch inspired by Truman Capote. American actor Cheyenne Jackson is a special guest director and English singer and songwriter Sam Smith is a guest judge.

Onya Nurve wins the episode's main challenge. Lydia B Kollins is eliminated from the competition after placing in the bottom two and losing a lip-sync contest against Lana Ja'Rae to "Unholy" (2022) by Smith and German singer Kim Petras.

== Episode ==
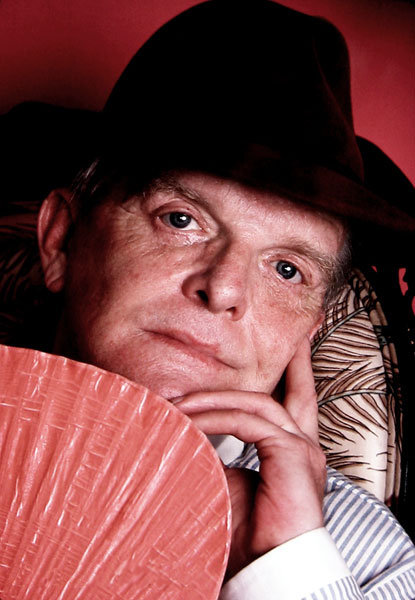
The main challenge has contestants act in a sketch inspired by author Truman Capote (pictured).

The contestants return to the Werk Room following the elimination of Arrietty on the previous episode. They react to the message she left about Onya Nurve, whose feelings are hurt. On a new day, RuPaul greets the contestants and reveals the main challenge: acting in "Ross Mathews vs. The Ducks", a sketch paying tribute to Truman Capote and his "Swans". RuPaul says the "Ducks" are inspired by "viral vixens" and reveals that Cheyenne Jackson is guest directing.

The contestants read the script, select their roles, and rehearse, before recording the series of sketches with Ross Mathews portraying Capote. The first three sketches each have a pair of contestants: Lana Ja'Rae and Onya Nurve; Lydia B Kollins and Sam Star; and Lexi Love and Suzie Toot. Jewels Sparkles delivers the final monologue. On Elimination Day, the contestants return to the Werk Room to prepare for the fashion show. Lydia B Kollins discusses her sense of humor.

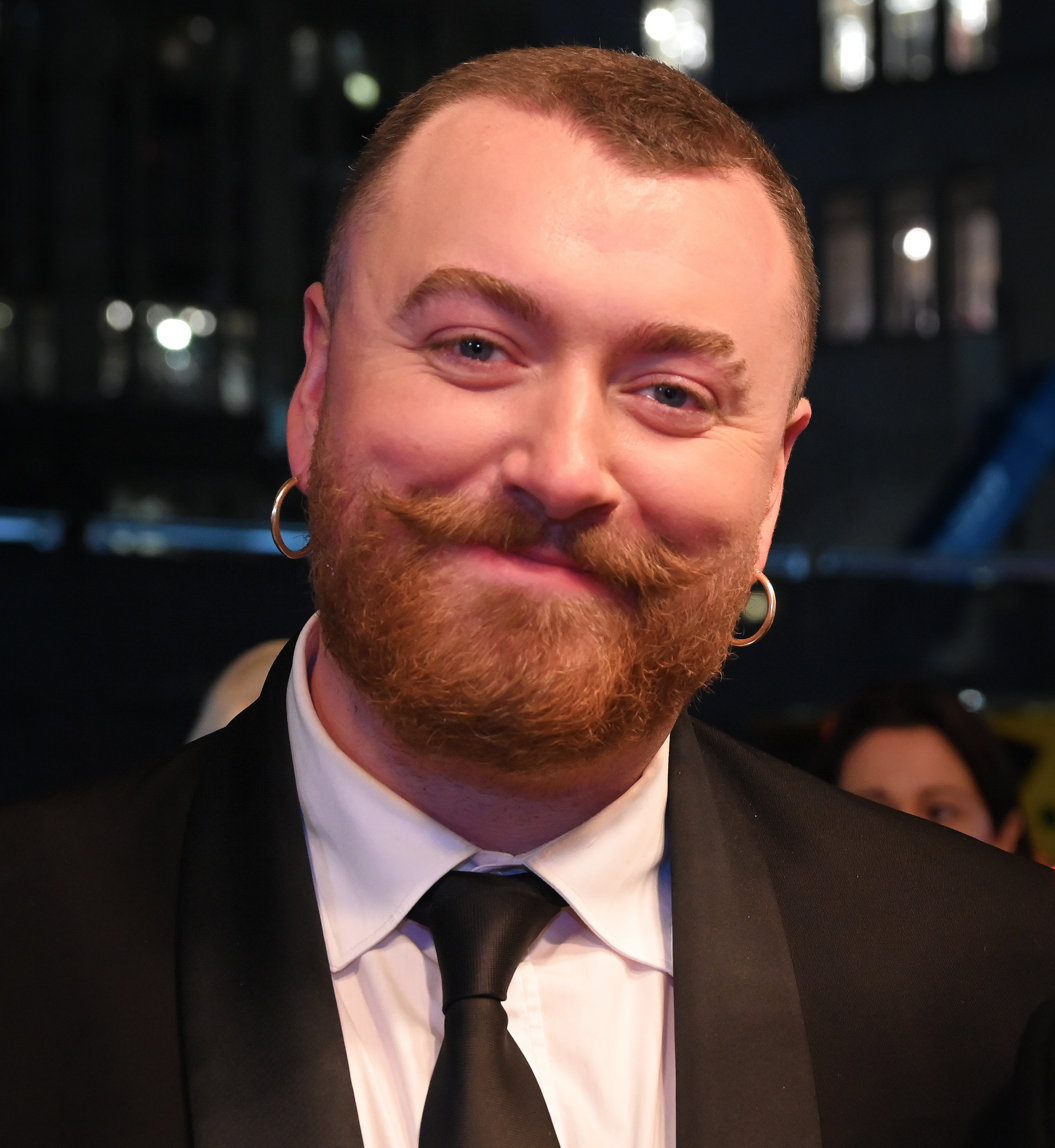
Sam Smith (pictured in 2025) is a guest judge.

On the main stage, RuPaul welcomes fellow judging panelists Michelle Visage and Mathews, as well as guest judge Sam Smith. RuPaul reveals the runway category: "Black and White Ball". After the fashion show, the contestants and judges watch the sketch. The judges deliver their critiques. RuPaul asks the contestants who should go home and why. The contestants answer, then go back stage while the judges deliberate. RuPaul then shares the results with the group. Lexi Love and Suzie Toot are deemed safe. Sam Star and Onya Nurve receive positive critiques, and Onya Nurve is declared the winner, earning her a cash tip of $5,000. Jewels Sparkles, Lana Ja'Rae, and Lydia B Kollins receive negative critiques, then Jewels Sparkles is deemed safe. Lana Ja'Rae and Lydia B Kollins place in the bottom and face off in a lip-sync contest to "Unholy" (2022) by Smith and Kim Petras. Lana Ja'Rae wins the lip-sync and Lydia B Kollins is eliminated from the competition.

== Production ==
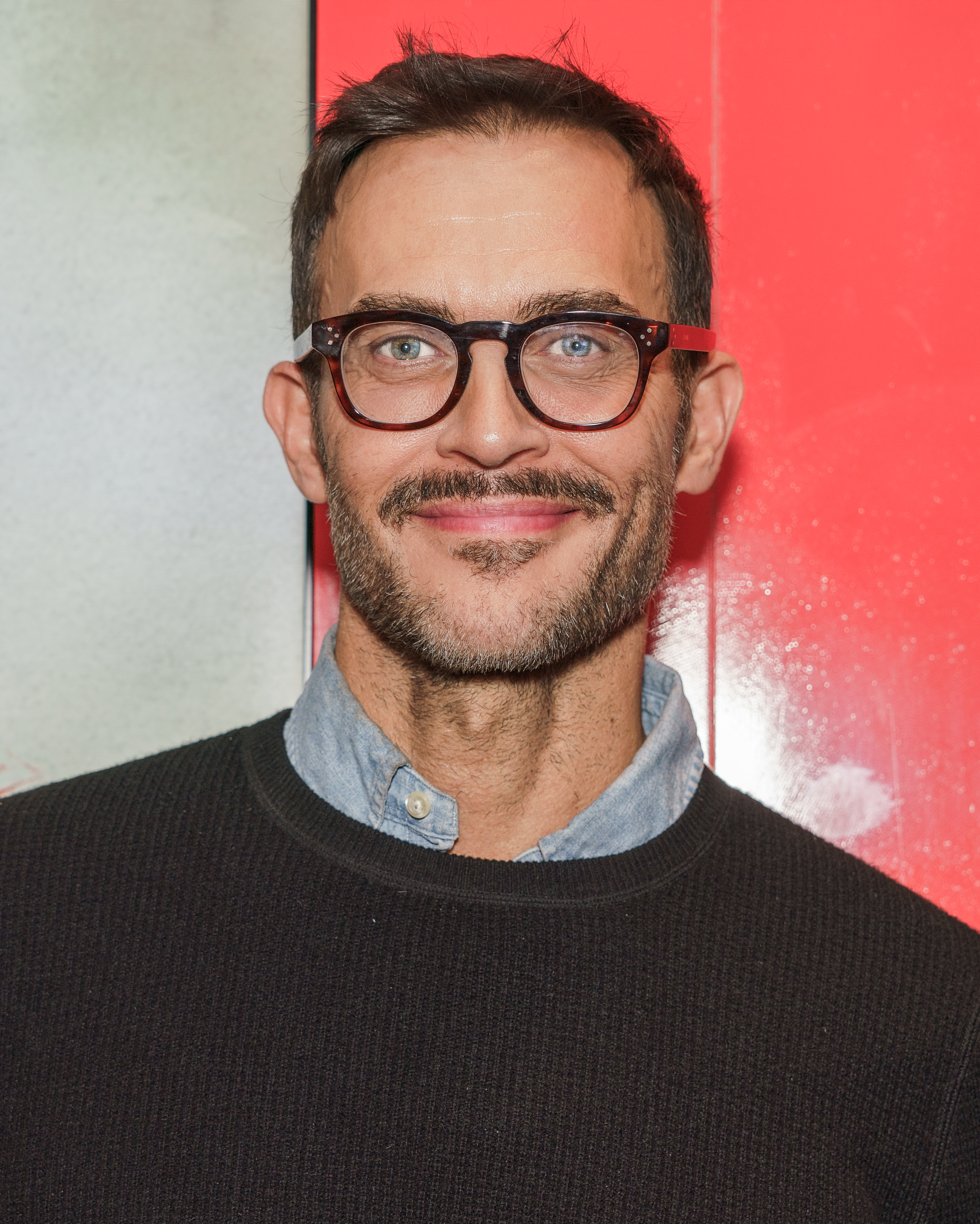
Cheyenne Jackson (pictured in 2025) is a guest director for the main challenge and appears in the episode's sketch.

The episode originally aired on March 14, 2025.

Lydia B Kollins uses scissors during the "Unholy" performance.

=== Fashion ===
Sam Star wears a jester-inspired outfit and a mask. Lana Ja'Rae has bows in her hair and polka dots on part of her outfit. Onya Nurve's outfit resembles a black swan. Lydia B Kollins wears a tight dress with long sleeves. Suzie Toot presents a cat-inspired outfit. Lexi Love wears a short dress. Jewels Sparkles' cat-inspired outfit is based on one of her favorite illustrations by a designer.

=== Sketch ===
The sketch is a parody of Feud: Capote vs. The Swans, the second season of the American anthology television series Feud.

In addition to guest directing, Jackson also acts in the sketch. Lana Ja'Rae portrays a rap mogul named Drippy Q and Onya Nurve plays Big Fupa. Sam Star and Lydia B Kollins portray a Southern woman named Shonda Cox and proctologist Sniffy Scattington, respectively. Their scene has them utilize ASMR. Suzie Toot and Lexi Love play former actresses Felicity Slanderpump and Lisa Rimmer (referencing Lisa Vanderpump and Lisa Rinna of The Real Housewives of Beverly Hills), respectively. After Jewels Sparkles' monologue, the other characters throw water at Capote.

== Reception ==
Jason P. Frank of Vulture rated the episode two out of five stars. Stephen Daw ranked "Unholy" number 20 in Billboard's 2025 list of the season's lip-syncs. Daw said "every one of Lana's movements are calculated, planned and sexed-up, even if they weren't entirely interesting to watch", and wrote about Lydia B Kollins: "She started her performance very well, turning on camp aesthetics to make this performance as over-the-top as possible … and then the scissors came out. Trying to cut herself out of her restrictive dress, Lydia ended up ultimately abandoning the lip sync itself, simply trying to get her skirt off." Daw called the performance "perhaps the most shocking lip sync of the season, as the would-be lip sync assassin of this season finally got sent home".
