= Lip Sync Lalaparuza Smackdown (RuPaul's Drag Race season 17) =

- RuPaul's Drag Race episode
- Episode no.: Season 17; Episode 15
- Presented by: RuPaul
- Original air date: April 11, 2025

Episode chronology
← Previous "How's Your Headliner?"	Next → "Grand Finale"
- RuPaul's Drag Race season 17

"Lip Sync Lalaparuza Smackdown" is the fifteenth episode of the seventeenth season of the American television series RuPaul's Drag Race. It originally aired on April 11, 2025. Ahead of the season finale, the eliminated contestants compete in a tournament of lip-sync contests for a prize of $50,000. Suzie Toot wins the tournament, earning her the title of Queen of She Done Already Done Had Herses. No contestants are eliminated on the episode.

== Episode ==
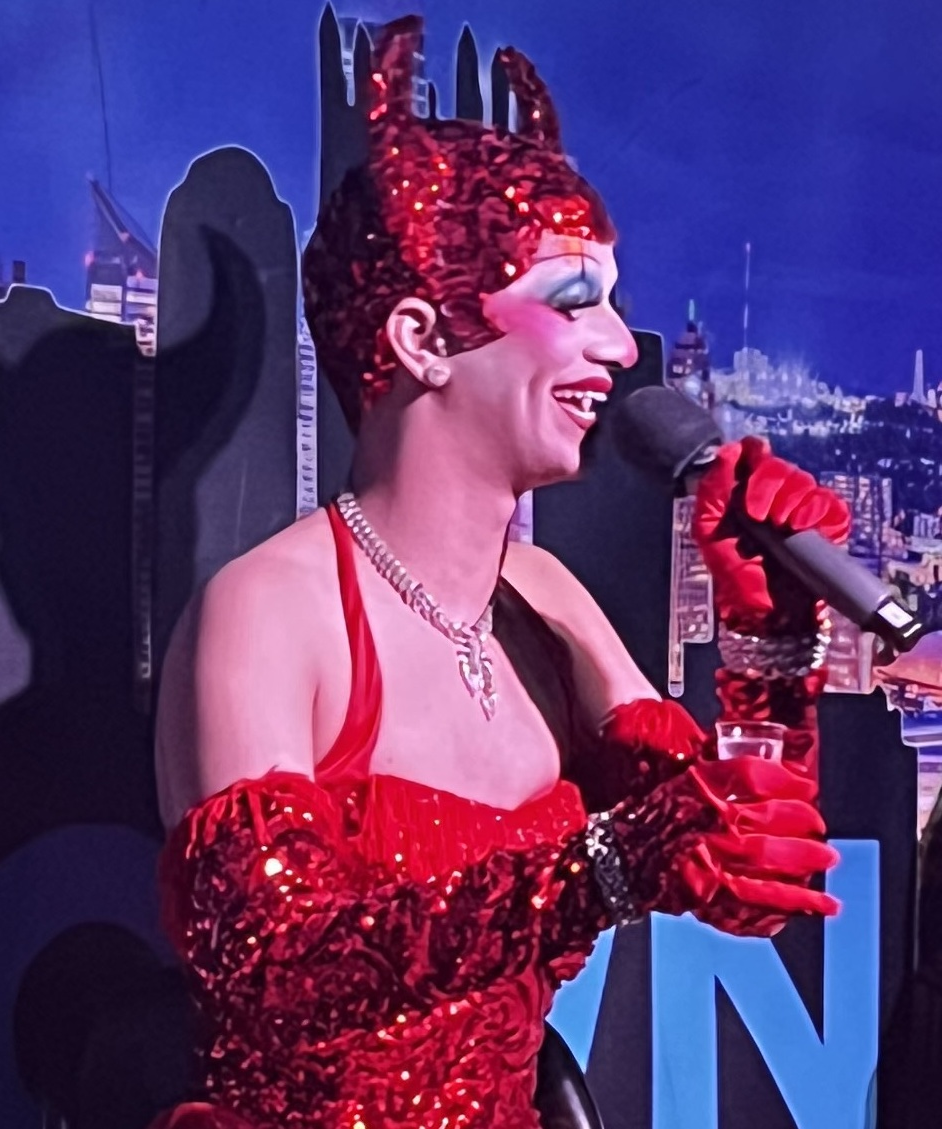
Suzie Toot (pictured in 2025) wins the episode's tournament of lip-sync contests.

The final four contestants return to the Werk Room, followed by the eliminated contestants. The group have a discussion, then start to prepare for the lip-sync tournament. Kori King and Lydia B Kollins confirm they are in a relationship. Arrietty apologizes to Onya Nurve for the message she left on the mirror. On the main stage, RuPaul welcomes fellow judges Michelle Visage and Ts Madison, as well as Bruno Alcantara from the Pit Crew. The season's contestants gather on the main stage and RuPaul explains the rules. The final four contestants return to the Werk Room to watch the performances.

For the tournament, contests who are selected by random draw choose either a preferred competitor or song. For Round 1, Hormona Lisa selects "Say Liza (Liza with a "Z")" by Liza Minnelli. She competes against Lydia B Kollins. Lydia B Kollins wins the contest. Suzie Toot chooses to compete against Joella. Joella selects "Training Season" (2024) by Dua Lipa. Suzie Toot is declared the winner. Lucky Starzzz selects "Step by Step" by Whitney Houston. She competes against Acacia Forgot. Lucky Starzzz wins the contest. Arrietty selects "Blow Me (One Last Kiss)" (2012) by Pink. She competes against Kori King. Kori King is declared the winner. As the two remaining contestants, Crystal Envy and Lana Ja'Rae compete in the fifth lip-sync. Bruno randomly chooses who will select the song. Lana Ja'Rae selects "You Make Me Feel (Mighty Real)" (1978) by Sylvester. Lana Ja'Rae wins the contest.

For Round 2, Lucky Starzzz selects "We Found Love" (2011) by Rihanna featuring Calvin Harris. She competes against Suzie Toot. Suzie Toot advances to the final round. The remaining three contestants (Kori King, Lana Ja'Rae, and Lydia B Kollins) perform to "360" (2024) by Charli XCX. Kori King advances to the final round. RuPaul asks all of the contestants to return to the main stage for the last contest. Kori King and Suzie Toot perform to "Apt." (2024) by Rosé and Bruno Mars. Suzie Toot wins the final round, earning $50,000 and the title of Queen of She Done Already Done Had Herses.

== Production and broadcast ==
The episode originally aired on April 11, 2025.

=== Fashion ===
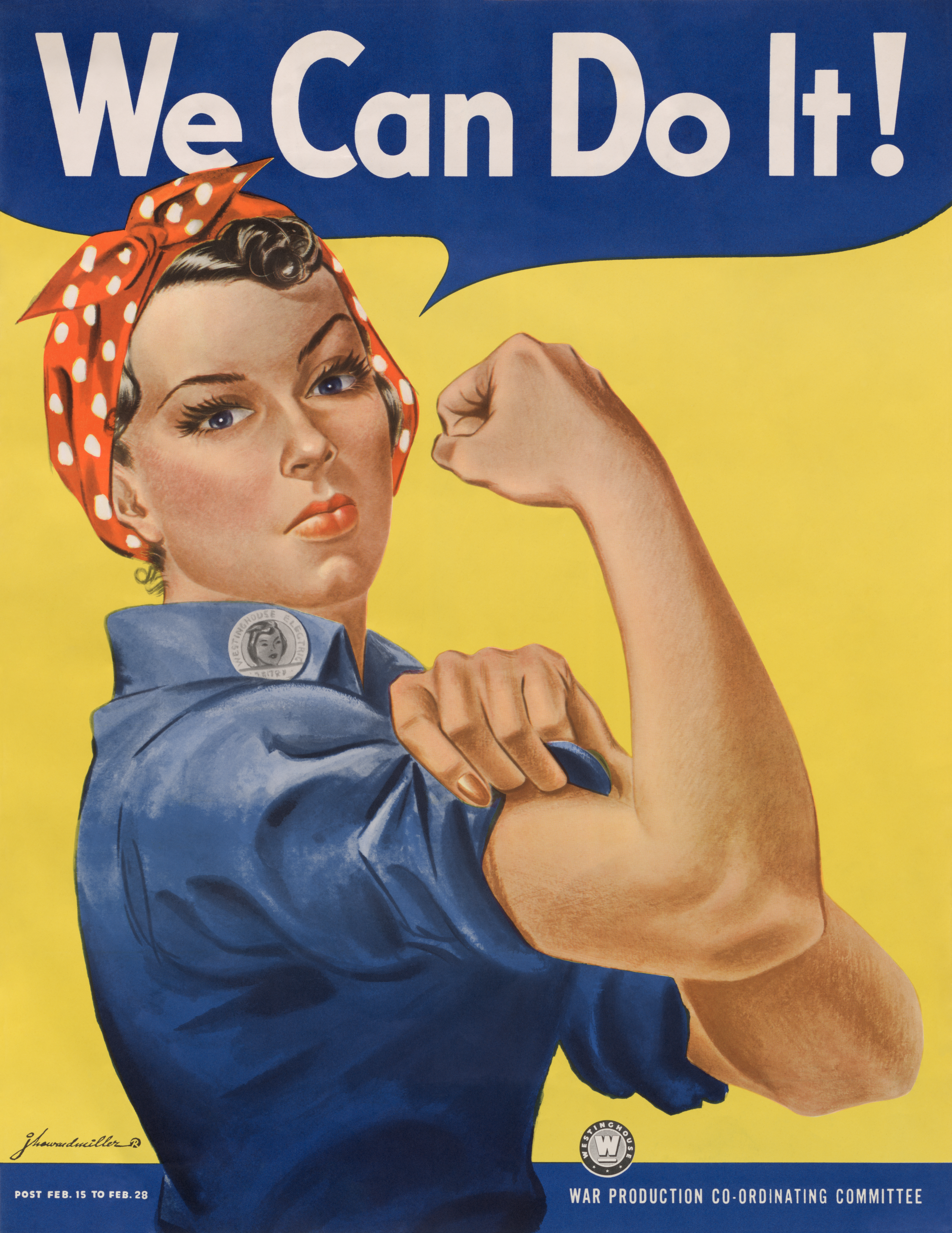
One of Suzie Toot's outfits drew comparisons to Rosie the Riveter (pictured is the "We Can Do It!" poster depicting the iconic figure of a strong female war production worker).

For the main stage, RuPaul wears a gold bodysuit. She enters with a red cape and has a blonde wig. For the lip-sync tournament, Hormona Lisa wears a pink dress with ruffles and a pink wig. Jude Cramer describes one of Suzie Toot's outfits as "a clown-meets-Rosie the Riveter fantasy". Lucky Starzzz's outfit has attachments resembling multiple basketballs on her head and as breasts.

== Reception ==
Stephen Daw ranked the "Apt." performance seventh in Billboard's list of the season's lip-sync contests, writing: "We love seeing a storyline reach its inevitable conclusion on Drag Race, and that's exactly what the final LaLaPaRuza lip sync delivered. The hilarious 'animosity' between Kori and Suzie got unleashed for this fitting final number, with Suzie finally earning her recognition as the true lip sync assassin of the season." Daw opined: "It was a nail-biter, too! Suzie's cutesy dance moves and on-point facial expressions met an equal match with Kori's boundless energy and swaggering charisma on the stage. But it became clear once Kori's fake boobs busted out of their costume that Suzie was the more polished queen between the two, earning her the much-deserved win." He ranked "Trainging Season" fourth in the same list.

Kevin O'Keeffe ranked "Step by Step" eighth in Xtra Magazine's list of the top ten Drag Race lip-syncs of 2025, writing: "This was as surprising as it was fun, and it was very fun. You definitely remember Lucky's basketball boobs look, which she used to full effect in this Whitney Houston lip sync battle. But what you may have forgotten is that Acacia puts up one hell of a fight here, including a slow dip gag that’s one of the funniest things in any of these lip syncs." O'Keeffe opined, "If you had told me going into the LaLaPaRuZa that my favourite battle from it would be between Lucky and Acacia, I would've balked—but after seeing it, I certainly couldn't call you wrong. Props not just for a great battle, but a genuinely and pleasantly surprising one."
