= The Villains Roast =

- RuPaul's Drag Race episode
- Episode no.: Season 17; Episode 10
- Presented by: RuPaul
- Original air date: March 7, 2025

Guest appearances
- Whitney Cummings (guest judge); Kandy Muse; Mistress Isabelle Brooks; Plane Jane

Episode chronology
← Previous "Heavens to Betsey!"	Next → "Ross Mathews vs. The Ducks"
- RuPaul's Drag Race season 17

"The Villains Roast" is the tenth episode of the seventeenth season of the American television series RuPaul's Drag Race. It originally aired on March 7, 2025. The episode's main challenge tasks contestants with performing stand-up comedy as part of a roast of former "villain" contestants. Whitney Cummings is a guest judge and Kandy Muse, Mistress Isabelle Brooks, and Plane Jane are the former competitors. Lydia B Kollins wins the main challenge. Arrietty is eliminated from the competition after placing in the bottom two and losing a lip-sync contest against Jewels Sparkles to "Ya Ya" (2024) by Beyoncé.

== Episode ==
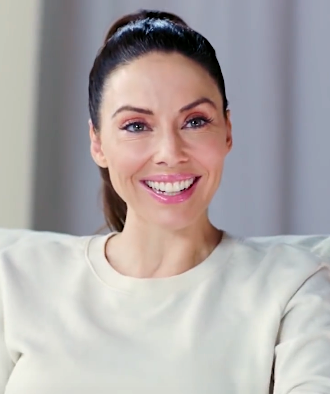
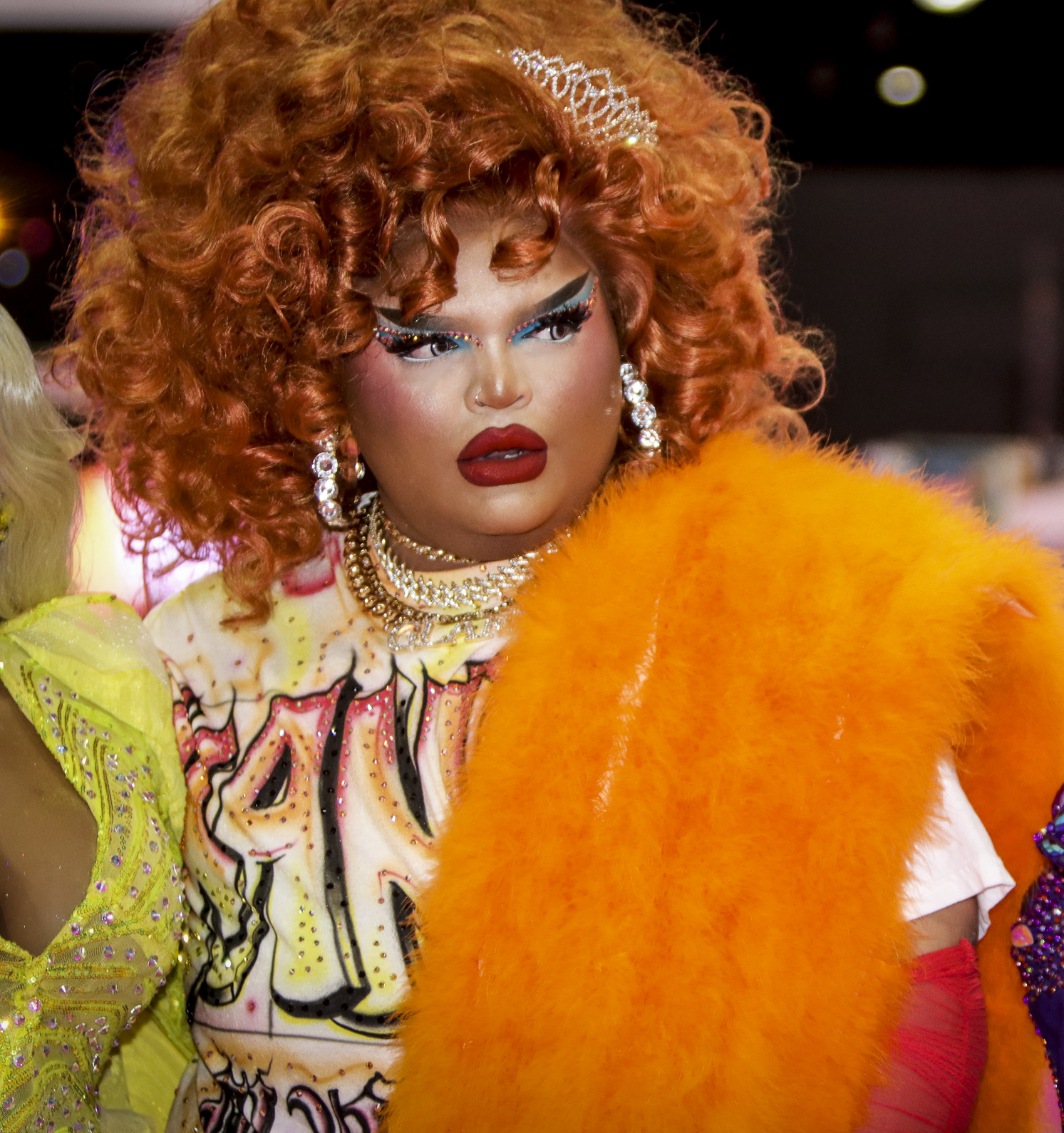
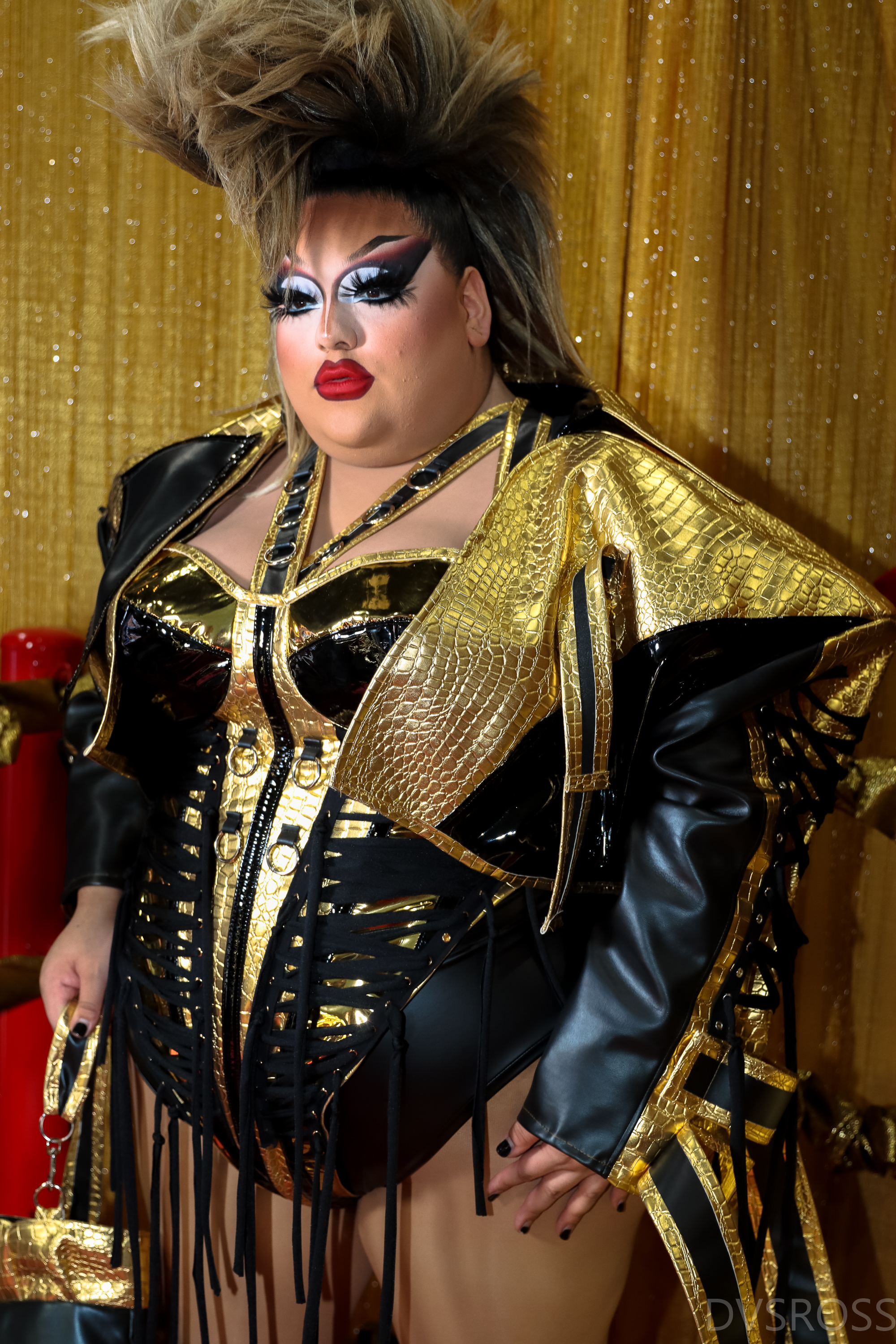
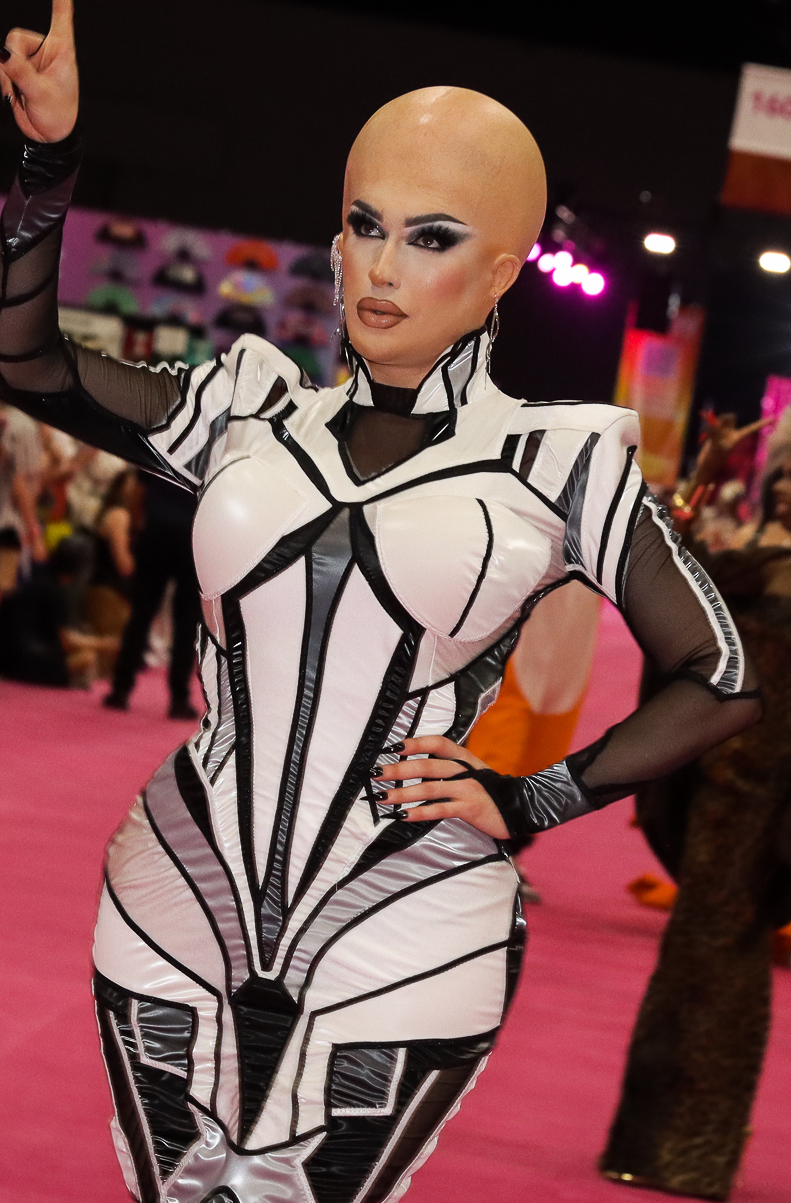
Whitney Cummings (top left, pictured in 2019) is a guest judge; former contestants Kandy Muse (top right, pictured at RuPaul's DragCon LA in 2022), Mistress Isabelle Brooks (bottom left, pictured at the same event in 2023), and Plane Jane (bottom right, pictured at the same event in 2024) make guest appearances.

The contestants return to the Werk Room after the elimination of Kori King on the previous episode. On a new day, Michelle Visage greets the contestants and invites them to join her at the dunk tank for a mini-challenge on the main stage. She introduces writer Joey Nolfi of Entertainment Weekly, who helps Visage ask questions to contestants. The contestants fall into the dunk tank one at a time, then Visage makes Nolfi fall into the tank. Visage introduces the main challenge, which tasks contestants with performing stand-up comedy as part of a roast of former "villain" contestants Kandy Muse, Mistress Isabelle Brooks, and Plane Jane. As the winner of the main challenge on the previous episode, Jewels Sparkles determines the order in which contestants will perform. The contestants share their preferred placement. After deliberating, Jewels Sparkles shares her decision. Some contestants dislike their placement in the line-up and feel slighted.

On the main stage, the contestants meet with comedy coaches Visage and Whitney Cummings. The contestants share some of their jokes and thoughts about the challenge. The contestants return to the Werk Room on a new day. Arrietty and Jewels Sparkles discuss Arrietty's placement. Separately, other contestants talk about the program order while preparing for the roast. Arrietty and Lexi Love confront Jewels Sparkles, who apologizes to Arrietty but not Lexi Love. Back on the main stage, RuPaul welcomes fellow judges Visage and Ts Madison as well as guest judge Cummings. After RuPaul introduces the former contestants, the current season's contestants perform the roast for the judges. Arrietty uses some of Jewels Sparkles' jokes. The "villains" end the show together.

RuPaul introduces the runway category ("Who Wear's Short Shorts?") and the contestants present their looks. RuPaul dismisses the safe contestants, then the judges deliver their critiques to the top and bottom contestants. The contestants are sent back stage while the judges deliberate, then RuPaul shares the results with the group. Lydia B Kollins is declared the winner of the main challenge. Lana Ja'Rae, Sam Star, and Lexi Love are deemed safe. Arrietyy and Jewels Sparkles place in the bottom two and face off in a lip-sync contest to "Ya Ya" (2024) by Beyoncé. Jewels Sparkles is declared the winner of the lip-sync and Arrietty is eliminated from the competition. Arrietty returns to the Werk Room and leaves a message to the remaining contestants on the mirror using lipstick.

== Production and broadcast ==
The episode originally aired on March 7, 2025.

Arrietty's exit line from the main stage is: "Well, it looks like the runway category just dropped immensely, ya'll ugly boogers." Her mirror message said, "Hiiiii.... Byeeee..... As one smelly bitch to another, Onya please brush your teeth." She has said she was prepared for a backlash after the show aired.

=== Fashion ===
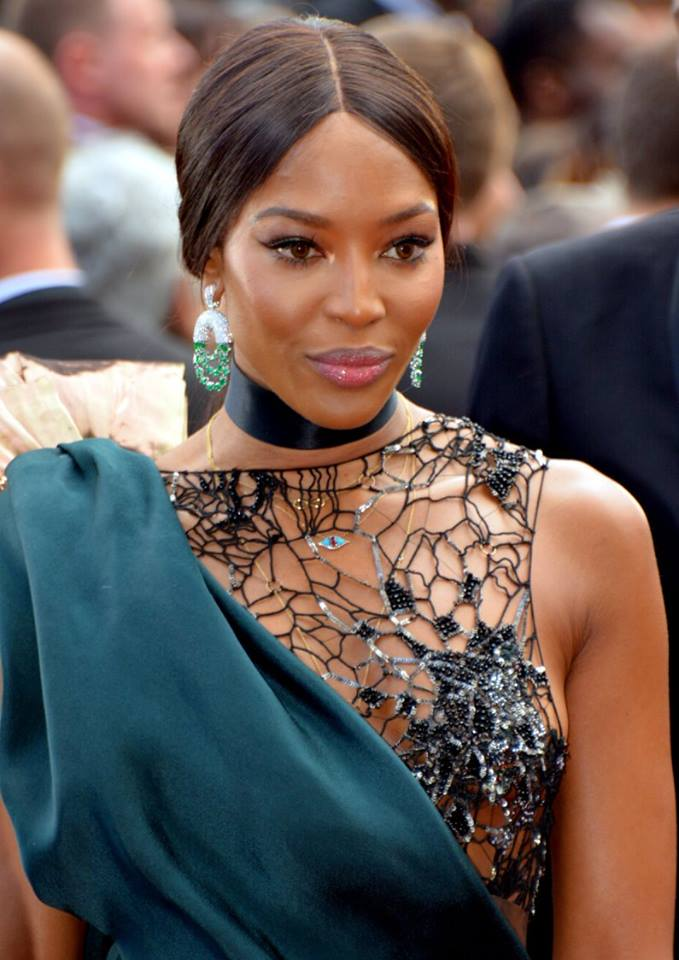
For the episode's fashion show, Lana Ja'Rae presents a look inspired by British model Naomi Campbell (pictured in 2018).

For the fashion show, Onya Nurve wears denim. Arrietty has a crown on her head and Jewels Sparkles has bows in her hair. Lana Ja'Rae wears an outfit inspired by British model Naomi Campbell, which includes a red baseball cap with the text "RPDR-17". Sam Star's outfit is inspired by American football. Lydia B Kollins wears an outfit made of toile. Suzie Toot has an Elizabethan era outfit. The word "fruity" appears on the back of her shorts. Lexi Love also wears a denim outfit.

== Reception ==
Vulture rated the episode five out of five stars. Stephen Daw ranked the "Ya Ya" performance sixth in Billboard's list of the season's lip-sync contests, calling it "an example of excellent reality TV storytelling, and it ended as every good story should; with the villain defeated and the hero victorious". Daw wrote: "After going from friends to bitter rivals in a single episode, Arrietty and Jewels Sparkles left it all on the stage trying to send the other girl home. [Arietty] brought as much energy as she could muster to this fiery performance, whipping every inch of her black human lace wig around the main stage. But Jewels seemed almost supernatural here, floating from moment to moment in this number, all while embodying Queen Bey’s deeply unfazed demeanor. Even when she tripped, she transformed it into a graceful dip and punctuated it by (literally) kicking her competitor’s crown off the stage."
