= RDR Live! =

RDR Live! may refer to:

- RDR Live! (RuPaul's Drag Race season 16), a 2024 television episode
- RDR Live! (RuPaul's Drag Race season 17), a 2025 television episode
