= Drag Baby Mamas =

- RuPaul's Drag Race episode
- Episode no.: Season 17; Episode 13
- Directed by: Nick Murray
- Presented by: RuPaul
- Original air date: March 28, 2025

Guest appearance
- June Diane Raphael

Episode chronology
← Previous "Charisma, Uniqueness, Nerve & Talent Monologues"	Next → "How's Your Headliner?"
- RuPaul's Drag Race season 17

"Drag Baby Mamas" is the thirteenth episode of the seventeenth season of American reality competition television series RuPaul's Drag Race, and the 235th episode overall. It originally aired on the cable network MTV on March 28, 2025, and was followed by an episode of the companion series RuPaul's Drag Race: Untucked. The episode's main challenge tasks the five remaining contestants with giving makeovers to family members.

June Diane Raphael is as a guest judge, alongside regular panelists RuPaul, Michelle Visage, and Law Roach. Sam Star wins the main challenge. Jewels Sparkles and Onya Nurve place in the bottom and face off in a lip-sync contest to "1 Thing" by Amerie, but RuPaul decides not to eliminate either contestant from the competition. The Untucked episode earned a nomination in the Outstanding Picture Editing for an Unstructured Reality Program category at the 77th Primetime Creative Arts Emmy Awards.

== Episode ==
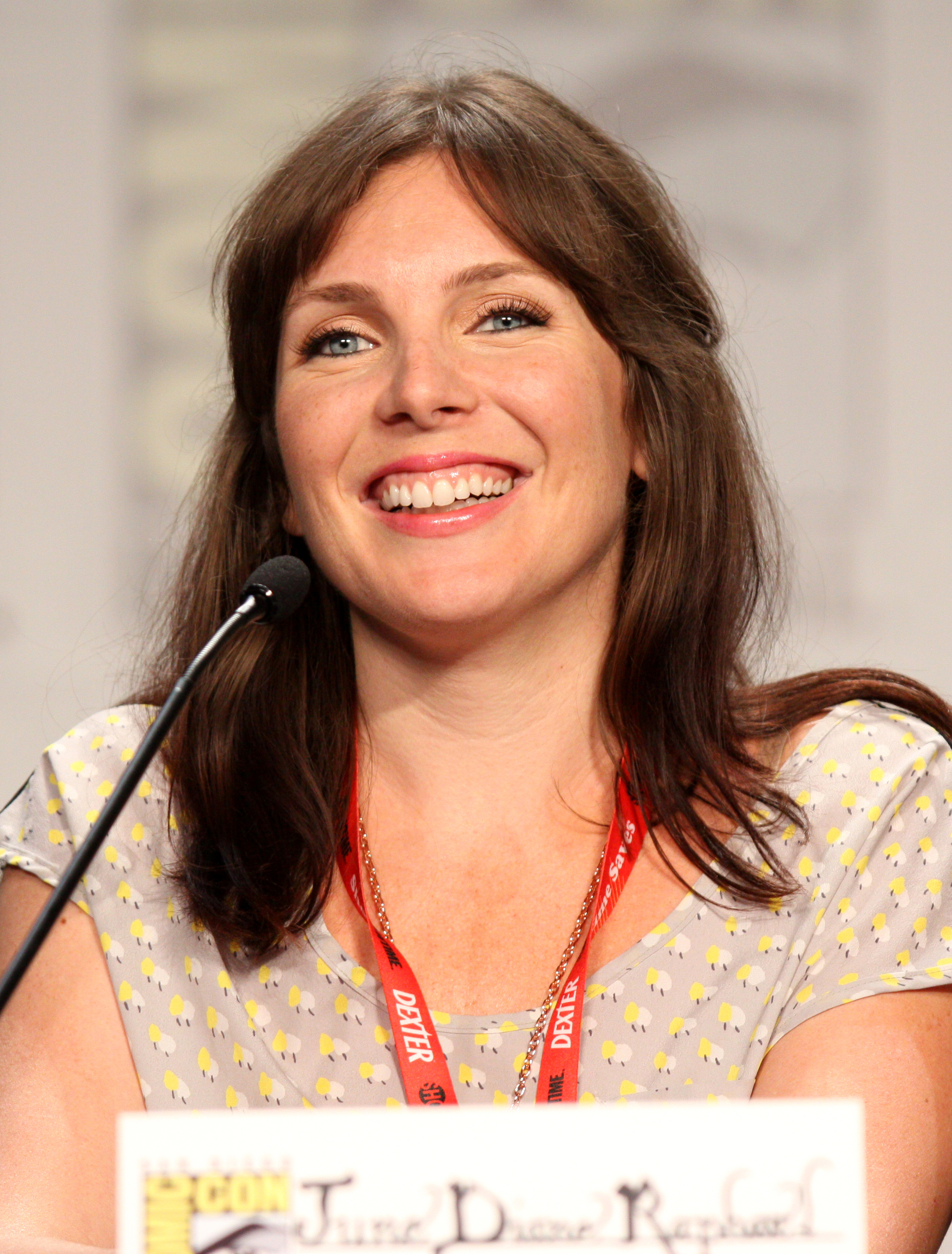
June Diane Raphael is a guest judge.

The remaining five contestants return to the Werk Room after Lana Ja'Rae's elimination on the previous episode. On a new day, RuPaul greets the group and reveals the mini-challenge, which tasks the contestants with participating in "Spill the Tea". The game has contestants reveal their opinions about fellow competitors in response to a series of questions asked by RuPaul. Onya Nurve is declared the winner of the mini-challenge, earning her a cash prize of $2,500.

RuPaul then reveals the main challenge, which tasks the contestants with giving makeovers to family members. After the contestants are reunited with their parents, the pairs begin to prepare for the fashion show. RuPaul returns to the Werk Room to meet with each group, asking questions and offering advice. RuPaul gives praise to the parents for supporting their children. Lexi Love is emotional when her mother uses her preferred gender pronouns for the first time. Suzie Toot and her mother discuss when Suzie Toot came out as gay. In a confessional, Suzie Toot describes her relationship with her mother.

On the main stage, RuPaul welcomes fellow panelists Michelle Visage and Law Roach, as well as guest judge June Diane Raphael. RuPaul shares the runway category ("Drag Family Resemblance"), then the fashion show commences. The judges deliver their critiques, deliberate, and share the results with the group. Sam Star wins the main challenge. Jewels Sparkles and Onya Nurve place in the bottom and face off in a lip-sync contest to "1 Thing" (2005) by Amerie. RuPaul decides not to eliminate either contestant from the competition.

== Production and broadcast ==
Suzie Toot and Queenie Toot present black-and-white looks inspired by the animated cartoon character Betty Boop (pictured).

The episode originally aired on March 28, 2025.

During the lip-sync contest, Onya Nurve kicks Jewels Sparkles's wig over the judges panel.

=== Fashion ===
For the main stage, RuPaul wears a gold outfit and a blonde wig. For the fashion show, Lexi Love and Mimi Lovely wear pink and red outfits, respectively. The former has hearts on her outfit and the latter has roses and her outfit. Both wear headpieces and long earrings. Sam Star and Sassy Star have similar denim outfits with gold accessories and matching gold cowboy hats.

Suzie Toot and Queenie Toot have Betty Boop-inspired black-and-white outfits. Both wear headpieces to make them appear to have heart-shaped heads. Jewels Sparkles and Salchicha Sparkles have pastel outfits with similar designs as well as sunglasses. Onya Nurve and Nunya Bidness have outfits with corsets and neon-colored wigs.

== Reception ==
Stephen Daw of Billboard called the "1 Thing" performance "stunning". He also ranked the contest third in the magazine's list of the season's lip-syncs, writing: "These two queens took radically different approaches to their performances that paid dividends for themselves and the audience watching. Onya delivered every word flawlessly while embodying all the attitude in Amerie's voice." Daw opined, "But Jewels came with completely correct choreography, flowing from one stunt into the next without so much as breaking a sweat. Even in a later season of Drag Race, where it often feels like double shantays are doled out generously, Onya and Jewels handily earned their respective places." Jazz Tangcay of Variety called the contest "fiercely competitive" and Kevin O'Keeffe of Xtra Magazine described Jewels Sparkles's performance as "killer".

The Untucked episode earned Jimmy Bazan, Johanna Gavard, and Miguel Siqueiros a nomination in the Outstanding Picture Editing for an Unstructured Reality Program category at the 77th Primetime Creative Arts Emmy Awards.
