= Charisma, Uniqueness, Nerve & Talent Monologues =

- RuPaul's Drag Race episode
- Episode no.: Season 17; Episode 12
- Presented by: RuPaul
- Original air date: March 21, 2025

Guest appearance
- Jerrod Carmichael

Episode chronology
← Previous "Ross Mathews vs. The Ducks"	Next → "Drag Baby Mamas"
- RuPaul's Drag Race season 17

"Charisma, Uniqueness, Nerve & Talent Monologues" is the twelfth episode of the seventeenth season of the American television series RuPaul's Drag Race. It originally aired on March 21, 2025. The episode's main challenge tasks contestants with sharing personal stories and acting out narratives through interpretive dance. American comedian Jerrod Carmichael is a guest judge. Lexi Love and Onya Nurve win the main challenge. Lana Ja'Rae is eliminated from the competition after placing in the bottom two and losing a lip-sync contest against Sam Star to "Illusion" by Dua Lipa.

== Episode ==
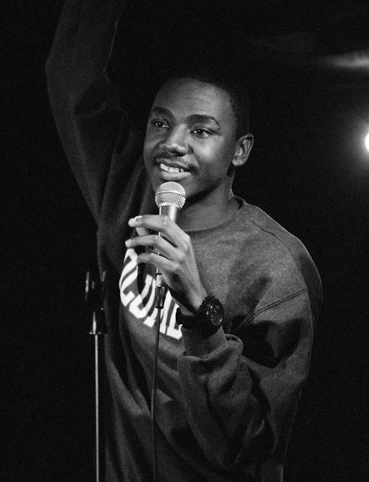
American comedian Jerrod Carmichael is a guest judge.

The contestants return to the Werk Room following the elimination of Lydia B Kollins on the previous episode. On a new day, RuPaul greets the contestants and introduces the mini-challenge. In self-selected pairs, the contestants have fifteen minutes to write biographies. Jewels Sparkles wins the mini-challenge.

RuPaul reveals the main challenge, which tasks contestants with sharing personal stories while their partners act out the narratives through interpretive dance. The topics of the contestants' stories are determined by drawing cards from a box. For winning the mini-challenge, Jewels Sparkles determines the performance order. The pairs make plans and rehearse choreography in the Werk Room. As a group, the contestants decide the performance order and begin to prepare for challenge. Suzie Toot discusses her experience with alcoholism within her family and Lana Ja'Rae describes her history of clowning and miming.

On the main stage, RuPaul welcomes fellow panelists Michelle Visage and Ts Madison as well as guest judge Jerrod Carmichael. RuPaul also reveals the runway category: "Ugliest Dress Ever", in honour of the ten year anniversary of the same runway category being used in the season 7 episode "Divine Inspiration". The contestants then perform in the Charisma, Uniqueness, Never & Talent Monologues for the judges. The judges then deliver their critiques, then deliberate while the contestants are back stage. RuPaul then shares the results with the contestants. Lexi Love and Onya Nurve are declared the winners of the challenge. Jewels Sparkles and Suzie Toot are deemed safe. Lana Ja'Rae and Sam Star place in the bottom and face off in a lip-sync contest to "Illusion" (2024) by Dua Lipa. Sam Star wins the lip-sync and Lana Ja'Rae is eliminated from the competition. Lana Ja'Rae returns to the Werk Room to leave a message for the remaining contestants.

== Production ==
The episode originally aired on March 21, 2025.

Following is the program of the Charisma, Uniqueness, Nerve & Talent Monologues:

- Suzie Toot: "Learn That the Hard Way", with interpretive dance by Jewels Sparkles
- Jewels Sparkles: "Out of This World", with interpretive dance by Suzie Toot
- Onya Nurve: "Obsessed", with interpretive dance by Lexi Love
- Lexi Love: "Payback's a Bitch", with interpretive dance by Onya Nurve
- Sam Star: "Triggered", with interpretative dance by Lana Ja'Rae
- Lana Ja'Rae: "Lost", with interpretive dance by Sam Star

Lana Ja'Rae's main stage exit line was, "Well, is the bus still running?" Her mirror message read, "Keep on Ja'Reaming. Live laugh Lana."

=== Fashion ===
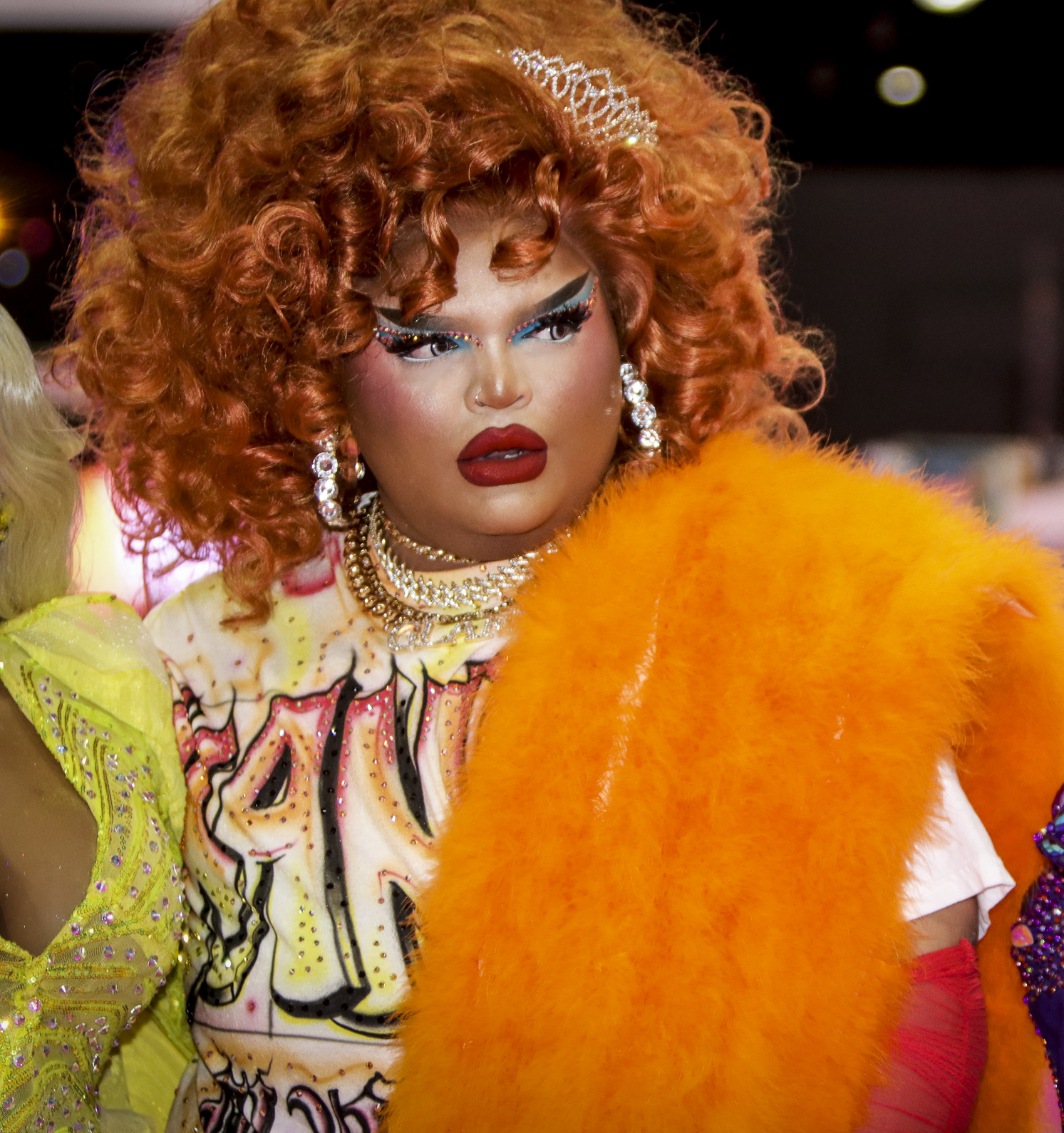
Lana Ja'Rae's outfit references one worn by former contestant Kandy Muse (pictured at RuPaul's DragCon LA in 2022)

Suzie Toot's look resembles a Christmas tree. Jewels Sparkles presents an outfit that recreates her mother's prom dress. Onya Nurve's outfit resembles a turkey and she wears a stoned headpiece. Lexi Love's outfit is made of tutus of various colors. Sam Star's outfit resembles meat. Lana Ja'Rae's dress was previously worn by former contestant Kandy Muse.

== Reception ==
Stephen Daw of Billboard said Lana Ja'Rae and Sam Star "left it all on the stage" during the lip-sync contest. He also ranked the performance number 11 in Billboard's overview of the season's lip-syncs, writing: "Sam delivered the goods with this lip sync. Lana, meanwhile, did a stellar job defending herself. In what was likely her best performances of the season, Lana slinked around the stage in a barely-there bikini, tapping into the song’s seductive vocals to capture the judges’ attention. Lana probably edged out Sam with just her performance, but even before this lip sync was announced, the result was clear as day; Lana’s time was up, no matter how much she nailed this lip sync."
