= Grand Finale (RuPaul's Drag Race season 17) =

- RuPaul's Drag Race episode
- Episode no.: Season 17; Episode 16
- Presented by: RuPaul
- Original air date: April 18, 2025

Guest appearances
- Liza Minnelli; Sapphira Cristál; Xunami Muse; Nymphia Wind

Episode chronology
← Previous "Lip Sync Lalaparuza Smackdown"	Next → "You Can't Keep a Good Drag Queen Down!"
- RuPaul's Drag Race season 17

"Grand Finale" is the sixteenth episode and finale of the seventeenth season of the American television series RuPaul's Drag Race. It originally aired on MTV on April 18, 2025. During the episode, the four finalists perform songs with original vocals. Onya Nurve is crowned the season's winner after defeating runner-up Jewels Sparkles in a lip-sync contest to "Abracadabra" by Lady Gaga. Additionally, Liza Minnelli receives the Giving Us Lifetime Achievement Award.

== Episode ==
The season's contestants appear on stage, then RuPaul performs the song " Good Luck and Don’t F%k It Up". The final four contestants perform individually to original songs.

Sapphira Cristál and Xunami Muse, who were voted Miss Congeniality on the sixteenth season, returned to reveal Crystal Envy as this season's title holder. Liza Minnelli receives a lifetime achievement award.

Jewels Sparkles and Onya Nurve are declared the two finalists. They face off in a lip-sync contest to "Abracadabra" (2025) by Lady Gaga. Onya Nurve is deemed the winner, making Jewels Sparkles the runner-up.

== Production ==
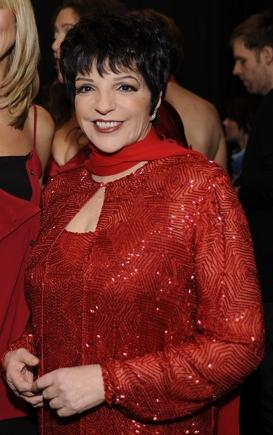
American actress and singer Liza Minnelli (pictured in 2008) received a lifetime achievement award during the episode.

The episode originally aired on MTV on April 18, 2025.

Jewels Sparkles performs "Ding" and Onya Nurve performs "It Do Take Nurve".

Minelli's younger brother Joey Luft also appeared on the episode.

Alastair James of PinkNews said of the final lip-sync contest: "While Sparkles brought several reveals, an element Drag Race fans have come to expect from lip syncs, especially in the final, Nurve notably did not. That has sparked some strong reactions from the Drag Race fandom, a notably opinionated crowd." Joey Nolfi said Onya Nurve's performance "might be one of the only recent finale lip-syncs that didn't include reveals". In his interview with Onya Nurve, the contestant recalled: "I did have a couple of reveals I was working on, but I’ve never been a queen of reveals. I don’t do tricks, gags, and goops in my regular life. It came to be about what type of queen I am. I figured if I never did reveals before I got on Drag Race, why would I do them now? I’m a great performer, and I put all my bets on that."

=== Fashion ===
Suzie Toot wore an outfit inspired by Audrey II from the musical Little Shop of Horrors. Jewels Sparkles wears a wide pink dress. Autostraddle describes Lexi Love's look as "a full Victoria’s Secret angel in flowers fantasy". Onya Nurve's brown-and-gold dress has a honeycomb pattern. Sam Star wears a white dress with gold fringe, white gloves, and a large cowboy hat.

== Reception ==
Jason P. Frank of Vulture rated the episode three out of five stars.

Jewels Sparkles took a break from social media "after experiencing the intense discourse surrounding the grand finale", according to Bernardo Sim of Out.

== See also ==
- List of awards and nominations received by Liza Minnelli
