= How's Your Headliner? =

Episode of RuPaul's Drag Race

- RuPaul's Drag Race episode
- Episode no.: Season 17; Episode 14
- Presented by: RuPaul
- Original air date: April 4, 2025

Guest appearances
- Tracee Ellis Ross (guest judge); Latrice Royale

Episode chronology
← Previous "Drag Baby Mamas"	Next → "Lip Sync LaLaPaRuZa Smackdown"
- RuPaul's Drag Race season 17

"How's Your Headliner?" is the fourteenth episode of the seventeenth season of the American television series RuPaul's Drag Race. It originally aired on April 4, 2025. The episode's main challenge tasks the top five contestants with auditioning for a role in the Las Vegas residency RuPaul's Drag Race Live! American actress Tracee Ellis Ross is a guest judge. Jewels Sparkles wins the episode's main challenge. Suzie Toot is eliminated from the competition after placing in the bottom two and losing a lip-sync contest against Sam Star to "Love Child" (1968) by Diana Ross & the Supremes.

== Episode ==
Suzie Toot (pictured in 2025) is eliminated from the competition.

The contestants return to the Werk Room after no one was eliminated from the competition on the previous episode. On a new day, RuPaul greets the group and reveals the main challenge, which tasks the contestants with auditioning for a role in the Las Vegas residency RuPaul's Drag Race Live! The contestants must create publicity photographs and promotional videos, get interviewed by Latrice Royale, then perform the song "Gift Shop". Before leaving, RuPaul shares that Tracee Ellis Ross is the guest judge.

The contestants start to develop their concepts, then take photographs with a photographer, RuPaul, and dancers. Latrice Royale interviews the contestants individually. On elimination day, the contestants make final preparations in the Werk Room for the performance and fashion show. The contestants talk about their favorite moments from the season and some of their first impressions of each other.

On the main stage, RuPaul welcomes fellow judges Michelle Visage and Ross Mathews, as well as guest judge Ross. RuPaul shares the assignment of the main challenge, then contestants perform "Gift Shop". RuPaul shares the runway category ("Opulent Outerwear"), then the fashion show commences. After the contestants present their looks, the judges review the publicity photographs and promotional videos. The judges then deliver their critiques, deliberate, and share the results with the group. Jewels Sparkles is declared the winner of the main challenge. Lexi Love and Onya Nurve are declared safe. Sam Star and Suzie Toot place in the bottom and face off in a lip-sync contest to "Love Child" (1968) by Diana Ross & the Supremes. Sam Star is declared the winner and Suzie Toot is eliminated from the competition. Suzie Toot returns to the Werk Room and uses lipstick to write a message on the mirror for the remaining contestants.

== Production and broadcast ==
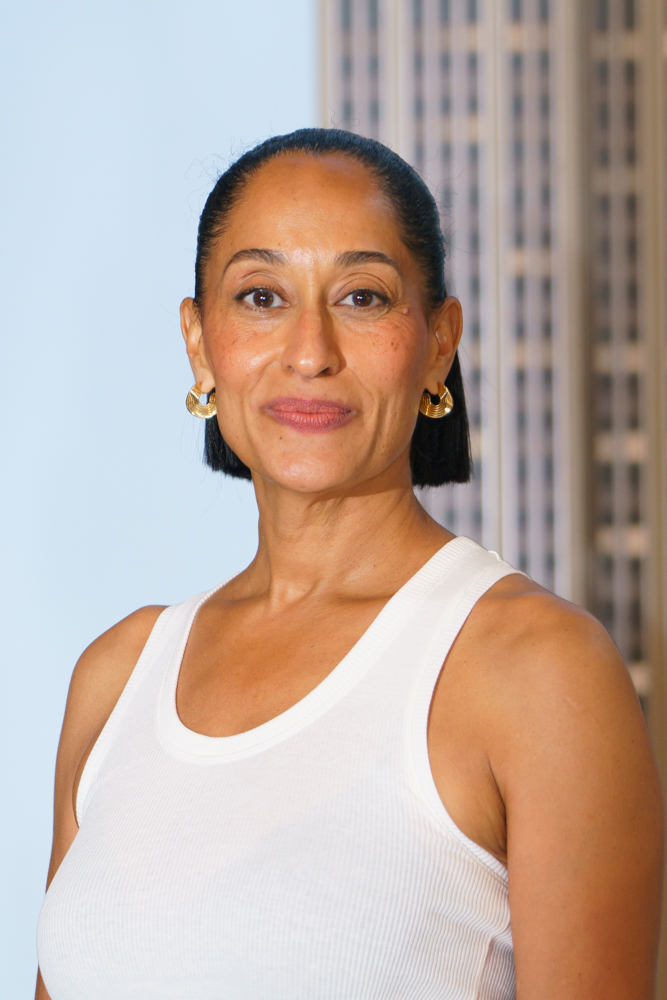
Tracee Ellis Ross (pictured in 2026) is a guest judge.

The episode originally aired on April 4, 2025.

For her exit line, Suzie Toot says, "RuPaul, I have just one thing to say", before tapping her toes. The message she leaves on the mirror says, "Getting the crown just got a LOT easier for y'all / Love you girls <3 —Suzie Toot".

=== Fashion ===
In the Werk Room, RuPaul wears a black jacket with stripes and a white dress shirt. On the main stage, RuPaul has a metallic dress and a blonde wig. Visage and Mathews have gold and red outfits, respectively.

For "Gift Shop", Jewels Sparkles has a black-and-blue outfit and a long dark wig. Lexi Love wears a colorful outfit with a long brown wig. Onya Nurve has a short dress and a dark wig. Sam wears a blonde wig. Suzie Toot has a short black dress and a red wig.

For the fashion show, Jewels Sparkles has a white dress and coat, as well as a blonde wig. Lexi Love has a puffer coat and a blue wig with ponytails. Onya Nurve wears a coat with multiple patterns, wide-legged pants, large earrings, and a head covering. Sam Star has an orange evening gown with rhinestones, as well as a blonde wig. Suzie Toot wears a red dress and matching coat, as well as a headpiece with pheasant feathers.

== Reception ==
Jason P. Frank of Vulture rated the episode three out of five stars. Frank wrote about Suzie Toot: "The main character of season 17 is gone, and the finale will be arguably more glamorous, but definitely much less interesting, because of it." Stephen Daw of Billboard said the judges' decision "sent shockwaves across the Drag Race fandom". Daw ranked the "Love Child" performance number 15 in the magazine's 2025 list of the season's lip-sync contests, writing: "Even though Suzie gave a more spirited performance, it seems that Ru appreciated Sam's subtler, more emotional approach to the icon's hit song, resulting in the most shocking elimination of the season." Daw also said, "The results may be coloring our opinions here, but it remains clear from the amount of outcry from the fans that we are not alone in being shocked that Suzie Toot’s stirring performance and winning track record wasn’t enough to keep her around for the finale."
