= RuPaul's Drag Race season 17 =

2025 season of RuPaul's Drag Race

RuPaul's Drag Race
- Season 17
- Promotional poster for season seventeen
- Hosted by: RuPaul
- Judges: RuPaul; Michelle Visage; Carson Kressley; Law Roach; Ts Madison; Ross Mathews; Jamal Sims
- No. of contestants: 14
- Winner: Onya Nurve
- Runner-up: Jewels Sparkles
- Miss Congeniality: Crystal Envy
- Companion show: Untucked!
- No. of episodes: 16

Release
- Original network: MTV
- Original release: January 3 – April 18, 2025

Season chronology
- ← Previous; Season 16 Next → Season 18

The seventeenth season of the American reality competition series RuPaul's Drag Race premiered on January 3, 2025. This marks the third season to air through cable network MTV. The seventeenth installment of the series documents drag queen RuPaul in search of the "Next Drag Superstar" for the United States.

RuPaul remained as host and head judge of the series. Television personalities Michelle Visage, Carson Kressley, Ts Madison, and Ross Mathews continued as regular judges. Fashion stylist Law Roach, who previously appeared as a guest judge, joined the judging panel.

Onya Nurve won the season alongside its title, a cash prize of $200,000, and a years-worth of Anastasia Beverly Hills cosmetics. Jewels Sparkles was the runner-up and Crystal Envy was voted Miss Congeniality.

== Production ==
=== Development ===
Throughout social media, the host and head judge RuPaul announced a casting call for drag performers to apply for the seventeenth season on October 30, 2023. The final deadline coincided with the premiere episode of season sixteen on January 5, 2024.

Two months later, RuPaul published his memoir titled The House of Hidden Meanings and embarked on a book tour where he was given a flash drive containing an audition tape from drag queen Hormona Lisa. Just months after its sixteenth season concluding, American cable network MTV announced the series renewal, including the companion series, on August 16.

=== Workroom ===
As season sixteen received several nominations at the 76th Primetime Emmy Awards, many journalists had the opportunity to visit the main stage and the workroom set. Fans quickly realized the newly constructed set for the upcoming season with journalists for People witnessing previous contestants Mhi'ya Iman Le'Paige and Morphine Love Dion using the main stage for a lip-sync contest. Architectural Digest released a video on August 22, where previous winner Nymphia Wind tours around the set with production designer Jen Chu explaining the scenery and inspiration for the series.

=== Tribute ===
The British Broadcasting Corporation (BBC) reported British drag performer The Vivienne, inaugurated winner of RuPaul's Drag Race UK (2019) and contestant of RuPaul's Drag Race All Stars (2022), had died on January 5, 2025. Subsequently, the second episode of the season featured an in memoriam segment dedicated to The Vivienne, following the regular credits on January 10.

== Marketing ==
A ten-second teaser was released on November 22, 2024, throughout social media, with RuPaul announcing the season premiering in January 2025. Nymphia Wind presented the contestants through the series official YouTube channel on December 4, showcasing their water-themed outfits and background.

Variety first reported on December 11 that All Stars winner Monét X Change would host The Pit Stop, a weekly webseries serving as an aftershow. The first episode premiered through YouTube with alumni contestant Raven as the first guest on January 4, 2025.

== Format ==
The season's double premiere retained the same format as the previous season, where contestants rank each other based on their performances for the main challenge; this format parodies television series The Circle.

Similar to the Chocolate Bar twist from season 14, this season featured a twist where the lip-sync loser is given an opportunity to stay in the contest called the "Badonka Dunk Tank" - the contestant is presented with Michelle Visage sitting on a dunk tank and must chose one of ten random levers, which if successfully struck, would drop Visage into the water and save the contestant from elimination. If they selected the incorrect lever, the contestant will be eliminated.

== Contestants ==
RuPaul's Drag Race season 17 contestants and their backgrounds (Note: All ages, names, with hometowns, and outcome are stated at time of filming.)
Contestant	Age	Hometown	Outcome
Onya Nurve	31	Cleveland, Ohio	Winner
Jewels Sparkles	23	Tampa, Florida	Runner-up
Lexi Love	33	Louisville, Kentucky	3rd place
Sam Star	24	Leeds, Alabama	3rd place
Suzie Toot	24	Fort Lauderdale, Florida	5th place (Note: Suzie was crowned Queen of She Done Already Done Had Herses after winning the Lip Sync LaLaPaRuza Smackdown.)
Lana Ja'Rae	22	New York City, New York	6th place
Lydia B Kollins (Note: Lydia Butthole Kollins is referred to as Lydia B Kollins on the series.)	23	Pittsburgh, Pennsylvania	7th place
Arrietty	28	Seattle, Washington	8th place
Kori King	24	Boston, Massachusetts	9th place
Acacia Forgot	28	Los Angeles, California	10th place
Crystal Envy	27	Asbury Park, New Jersey	11th place (Note: Crystal Envy was voted Miss Congeniality by fellow contestants.)
Hormona Lisa	30	Chattanooga, Tennessee	12th place
Joella	25	Los Angeles, California	13th place
Lucky Starzzz	26	Miami, Florida	14th place

== Contestant progress ==
Legend:

Onya Nurve won RuPaul's Drag Race season 17.
Jewels Sparkles was the runner-up.
Crystal Envy was voted Miss Congeniality (Miss C) by fellow contestants.
Suzie Toot was declared Queen of She Done Already Done Had Herses (SDADHH) after winning the final lip sync in the LaLaPaRuza Smackdown.
WIN indicates that the contestant won the challenge.
TOP2 indicates that the contestant was one of the two best performing in the challenge, but lost the lip sync to win it.
SAFE indicates that the contestant was declared safe by the judges.
BDT indicates that the contestant was saved from elimination by the Badonka Dunk Tank.
BTM (Bottom) indicates that the contestant was up for elimination.
ELIM (Eliminated) indicates that the contestant was eliminated.
LOSS indicates that the eliminated contestant participated in the LaLaPaRuza Smackdown, but lost one of the lip syncs.
Guest indicates that the contestant remained or returned as a guest.

Contestants progress with placements in each episode
Contestant	Episode															
Contestant	1	2	3	4	5	6	7	8	9	10	11	12	13	14	15	16
Onya Nurve	Guest	SAFE	SAFE	WIN	SAFE	SAFE	WIN	SAFE	SAFE	SAFE	WIN	WIN	BTM	SAFE	Guest	Winner
Jewels Sparkles	TOP2	Guest	SAFE	SAFE	SAFE	SAFE	SAFE	SAFE	WIN	BTM	SAFE	SAFE	BTM	WIN	Guest	Runner-up
Lexi Love	Guest	WIN	SAFE	SAFE	SAFE	SAFE	SAFE	SAFE	SAFE	SAFE	SAFE	WIN	SAFE	SAFE	Guest	Eliminated
Sam Star	Guest	SAFE	WIN	SAFE	SAFE	SAFE	SAFE	WIN	SAFE	SAFE	SAFE	BTM	WIN	BTM	Guest	Eliminated
Suzie Toot	WIN	Guest	SAFE	SAFE	WIN	SAFE	SAFE	SAFE	SAFE	SAFE	SAFE	SAFE	SAFE	ELIM	SDADHH	Guest
Lana Ja'Rae	Guest	SAFE	SAFE	SAFE	SAFE	BTM	BTM	SAFE	SAFE	SAFE	BTM	ELIM			LOSS	Guest
Lydia B Kollins	SAFE	Guest	SAFE	SAFE	BTM	SAFE	SAFE	SAFE	BTM	WIN	ELIM				LOSS	Guest
Arrietty	SAFE	Guest	SAFE	SAFE	BDT	WIN	SAFE	SAFE	SAFE	ELIM					LOSS	Guest
Kori King	Guest	SAFE	SAFE	BTM	SAFE	SAFE	SAFE	BTM	ELIM						TOP2	Guest
Acacia Forgot	BTM (Note: In episode 1, Acacia was voted by her fellow competitors as the bottom queen of the week, but did not lipsync until episode 2, when Hormona was also placed in the bottom by group vote.)	Guest	SAFE	SAFE	SAFE	SAFE	SAFE	ELIM							LOSS	Guest
Crystal Envy	Guest	TOP2	SAFE	SAFE	SAFE	SAFE	ELIM								LOSS	Miss C
Hormona Lisa	Guest	BDT	SAFE	SAFE	SAFE	ELIM									LOSS	Guest
Joella	SAFE	Guest	BTM	ELIM											LOSS	Guest
Lucky Starzzz	SAFE	Guest	ELIM												LOSS	Guest

== Lip syncs ==
Legend:

The contestant won the lip sync to win the challenge.
The contestant was eliminated after their first time in the bottom.
The contestant was eliminated after their second time in the bottom.
The contestant was eliminated after their third time in the bottom.
The contestant was eliminated after their fourth time in the bottom.
The contestant won the first round of the Lip Sync LaLaPaRuZa Smackdown and advanced to the next round.
The contestant won the second round of the Lip Sync LaLaPaRuZa Smackdown and advanced to the next round.
The contestant won the final round of the Lip Sync LaLaPaRuZa Smackdown and was declared Queen of She Done Already Done Had Herses.
The contestant won the Lip Sync for the Crown and was declared the winner of the season.

Episode	Top contestants			Song	Winner
1	Jewels Sparkles	vs.	Suzie Toot	"Woman's World" (Katy Perry)	Suzie Toot
2	Crystal Envy	vs.	Lexi Love	"Alter Ego" (Doechii, JT)	Lexi Love
2	Bottom contestants			Song	Eliminated
2	Acacia Forgot	vs.	Hormona Lisa	"Yes, And?" (Ariana Grande)	None (Note: Hormona Lisa lost the lip-sync, but was nonetheless saved from elimination by the Badonka Dunk Tank.)
3	Joella	vs.	Lucky Starzzz	"(It's Just) The Way That You Love Me" (Paula Abdul)	Lucky Starzzz
4	Joella	vs.	Kori King	"Buttons" (The Pussycat Dolls ft. Snoop Dogg)	Joella
5	Arrietty	vs.	Lydia B Kollins	"Boogie Wonderland" (Earth, Wind & Fire, The Emotions)	None (Note: Arrietty lost the lip sync, but was nonetheless saved from elimination by the Badonka Dunk Tank.)
6	Hormona Lisa	vs.	Lana Ja'Rae	"Get Him Back!" (Olivia Rodrigo)	Hormona Lisa
7	Crystal Envy	vs.	Lana Ja'Rae	"Hands to Myself" (Selena Gomez)	Crystal Envy
8	Acacia Forgot	vs.	Kori King	"Wet Dream" (Adam Lambert)	Acacia Forgot
9	Kori King	vs.	Lydia B Kollins	"Kiss Me Deadly" (Lita Ford)	Kori King
10	Arrietty	vs.	Jewels Sparkles	"Ya Ya" (Beyoncé)	Arrietty
11	Lana Ja'Rae	vs.	Lydia B Kollins	"Unholy" (Sam Smith, Kim Petras)	Lydia B Kollins
12	Lana Ja'Rae	vs.	Sam Star	"Illusion" (Dua Lipa)	Lana Ja'Rae
13	Jewels Sparkles	vs.	Onya Nurve	"1 Thing" (Amerie)	None
14	Sam Star	vs.	Suzie Toot	"Love Child" (Diana Ross & The Supremes)	Suzie Toot
Episode	Eliminated contestants			Song	Winner
15	Hormona Lisa	vs.	Lydia B Kollins	"Say Liza (Liza with a Z)" (Liza Minnelli)	Lydia B Kollins
15	Joella	vs.	Suzie Toot	"Training Season" (Dua Lipa)	Suzie Toot
15	Acacia Forgot	vs.	Lucky Starzzz	"Step By Step (Junior Vasquez Tribal X Beats)" (Whitney Houston)	Lucky Starzzz
15	Arrietty	vs.	Kori King	"Blow Me (One Last Kiss)" (P!nk)	Kori King
15	Crystal Envy	vs.	Lana Ja'Rae	"You Make Me Feel (Mighty Real)" (Sylvester)	Lana Ja'Rae
15	Lucky Starzzz	vs.	Suzie Toot	"We Found Love" (Rihanna ft. Calvin Harris)	Suzie Toot
15	Kori King vs. Lana Ja'Rae vs. Lydia B Kollins			"360" (Charli XCX)	Kori King
15	Suzie Toot	vs.	Kori King	"APT." (Rosé, Bruno Mars)	Suzie Toot
Episode	Final contestants			Song	Winner
16	Jewels Sparkles	vs.	Onya Nurve	"Abracadabra" (Lady Gaga)	Onya Nurve

== Guest judges ==
RuPaul and Michelle Visage remained as the regular judges, with Carson Kressley, Ts Madison, and Ross Mathews reappearing as alternating judges. Various celebrity guest judges set to appear were revealed on December 12, 2024. Law Roach was initially advertised as a celebrity guest judge but was later confirmed to be an alternating judge. Starring celebrity guest judges are listed below in order of episode appearance.

- Katy Perry, singer and television personality
- Doechii, rapper and singer
- Sandra Bernhard, actress, comedian and singer
- Julia Schlaepfer, actress
- Paul W. Downs, actor and writer
- Hunter Schafer, actress and model
- Quinta Brunson, actress and comedian
- Adam Lambert, singer and actor
- Betsey Johnson, fashion designer
- Whitney Cummings, actress and stand-up comedian
- Sam Smith, singer
- Jerrod Carmichael, actor, comedian and writer
- June Diane Raphael, actress and comedian
- Tracee Ellis Ross, actress

=== Special guests ===
Special guests who appeared in episodes, but did not judge on the main stage.

Episode 1

- Angeria Paris VanMicheals, contestant on season 14, and winner of All Stars season 9
- Aura Mayari, contestant on season 15 and All Stars season 11
- Honey Davenport, contestant on season 11
- Jaymes Mansfield, contestant on season 9 and All Stars season 8
- Kerri Colby, contestant on season 14 and All Stars season 10
- Kimora Blac, contestant on season 9
- Kylie Sonique Love, contestant on season 2 and winner of All Stars season 6
- Mayhem Miller, contestant on season 10, All Stars season 5 and RuPaul's Drag Race: UK vs. The World series 2
- Morgan McMichaels, contestant on season 2, All Stars season 3 and All Stars season 11
- Trinity the Tuck, contestant on season 9, All Stars season 7, and winner of All Stars season 4
- Victoria "Porkchop" Parker, contestant on season 1

Episode 2

- Lawrence Chaney, winner of RuPaul's Drag Race UK series 2

Episode 6

- Norvina, president of Anastasia Beverly Hills

Episode 7

- Alyssa Edwards, contestant on season 5, All Stars season 2, winner of Global All Stars

Episode 8

- Gabe Lopez, music producer

Episode 10

- Joey Nolfi, journalist at Entertainment Weekly
- Kandy Muse, runner-up on season 13 and All Stars season 8
- Mistress Isabelle Brooks, contestant on season 15 and All Stars season 10
- Plane Jane, contestant on season 16

Episode 11

- Cheyenne Jackson, actor and singer

Episode 14

- Albert Sanchez, photographer
- Latrice Royale, contestant on season 4, All Stars season 1 and All Stars season 4

Episode 16

- Liza Minnelli, actress and singer
- Xunami Muse, contestant and Miss Congeniality on season 16 and contestant on Latina Royale season 1
- Sapphira Cristál, runner-up and Miss Congeniality on season 16
- Nymphia Wind, winner of season 16

== Episodes ==
No. overall	No. in season	Title	Original release date
224	1	"Squirrel Games"	January 3, 2025
All 14 new queens along with other queens from previous seasons perform. Kori King entered the Werk Room on the premiere episode wearing an outfit inspired by Dunkin' Donuts. She was named the "trade" of the season by her castmates. In a Squid Game–inspired challenge, called "Ru Light, Green Light", they serve and move forward, but when the music stops and Lil' Poundcake turns around, they have to strike a pose. All queens from previous seasons are eliminated, leaving only the new queens. They all then enter the werkroom, and find out that "Ru Light, Green Light" was a photoshoot mini challenge. Lana Ja'Rae wins the mini challenge. For the main challenge, the queens split into two groups, with seven of them performing a talent in Drag Queens Got Talent.: Acacia Forgot – Playing guitar / Live singing; Arrietty – Lip-sync / Baile Folklorico; Jewels Sparkles – Original song lip-sync; Joella – Original song lip-sync; Lucky Starzzz – Original song lip-sync; Lydia B Kollins – Original song lip-sync / Comedy burlesque; Suzie Toot – Original song lip-sync / Tap dancing; On the runway, category is Masc For Masked Singer. The queens who didn't perform in this episode rank the queens performances using Rate-A-Queen, where it is announced that Jewels Sparkles and Suzie Toot are the top two queens of the week, and will lip-sync for the win. It is also announced that Acacia Forgot was rated lowest and will be lip-syncing for her life in the next episode. Jewels Sparkles and Suzie Toot lip-sync to "Woman's World" by Katy Perry. After the lip-sync, Suzie Toot is announced as the winner of the challenge.: Guest Judge: Katy Perry; Alternating Judge: Carson Kressley; Mini-Challenge: Ru Light, Green Light; Mini-Challenge Winner: Lana Ja'Rae; Mini-Challenge Prize: $2,500 cash tip; Main Challenge: Perform a talent in Drag Queens Got Talent; Runway Theme: Masc For Masked Singer; Top Two: Jewels Sparkles and Suzie Toot; Lip-sync Song: "Woman's World" by Katy Perry; Challenge Winner: Suzie Toot; Challenge Prize: $5,000 cash prize; Eliminated: None
225	2	"Drag Queens Got Talent – Part 2"	January 10, 2025
For the main challenge, the remaining seven queens perform a talent performing a talent in Drag Queens Got Talent.: Crystal Envy – Original song lip-sync; Hormona Lisa – Stand-up live comedy; Kori King – Original song lip-sync; Lana Ja'Rae – Original song lip-sync; Lexi Love – Original song lip-sync / Roller skating; Onya Nurve – Original song lip-sync; Sam Star – Original song lip-sync; On the runway, category is Is It Cake?. The queens who didn't perform in this episode rank the queens performances using Rate-A-Queen, where it is announced that Crystal Envy and Lexi Love are the top two queens of the week, and will lip-sync for the win. They then lip-sync to "Alter Ego" by Doechii and JT. After the lip-sync, Lexi Love is announced as the winner of the challenge. It was later announced that Hormona Lisa was rated lowest and will be lip-syncing for her life against Acacia Forgot, who was ranked the lowest in the previous episode. They then lip-sync to "Yes, And" by Ariana Grande. Acacia Forgot wins the lip-sync, but RuPaul reveals a new twist called "Badonka Dunk", where the eliminated queen gets to pull a lever, with two of them dunking Michelle Visage into a tank of water; if Michelle is dunked, the queen is saved from elimination. Hormona Lisa pulls the 7th lever, which dunks Michelle into the water and therefore saves Hormona from elimination.: Guest Judge: Doechii; Alternating Judge: Ts Madison; Main Challenge: Perform a talent in Drag Queens Got Talent; Runway Theme: Is It Cake?; Top Two: Crystal Envy and Lexi Love; Lip-sync Song: "Alter Ego" by Doechii and JT; Challenge Winner: Lexi Love; Challenge Prize: $5,000 cash prize; Bottom Two: Acacia Forgot and Hormona Lisa; Lip-sync Song: "Yes, And?" by Ariana Grande; Eliminated: None
226	3	"Monopulence!"	January 17, 2025
For this week’s main challenge, the queens create a monochromatic outfit inspired by properties from board game Monopoly, in honor of its 90th anniversary. On the runway, category is Monopulence!. Arrietty, Onya Nurve, and Sam Star receive positive critiques, with Sam Star winning the challenge. Joella, Kori King, and Lucky Starzzz receive negative critiques, with Kori King being safe. Joella and Lucky Starzzz lip-sync to "(It's Just) The Way That You Love Me" by Paula Abdul. Joella wins the lip-sync. Lucky Starzzz pulls the 3rd lever of the "Badonka Dunk", failing to dunk Michelle into the water and sashays away.: Guest Judge: Sandra Bernhard; Alternating Judge: Ts Madison; Main Challenge: Create a monochromatic outfit made inspired by Monopoly's properties; Runway Theme: Monopulence!; Challenge Winner: Sam Star; Challenge Prize: $5,000 cash prize; Bottom Two: Joella and Lucky Starzzz; Lip-sync Song: "(It's Just) The Way That You Love Me" by Paula Abdul; Eliminated: Lucky Starzzz; Farewell Message: "Lucky Starzzzzzzzzz was here! And don't you forget it! Keep on shining my 13 lucky stars ♡"
227	4	"Bitch, I'm a Drag Queen!"	January 24, 2025
For this week’s main challenge, the queens record and perform songs for commercials of the Bitch, I’m A Drag Queen! musical tracks featuring past Drag Race contestants. Kori King placed in the bottom two and defeated Joella in a lip-sync contest to "Buttons" by The Pussycat Dolls in order to remain in the competition.: Volume 1 - Arrietty, Crystal Envy, Hormona Lisa, Jewels Sparkles, Joella, Lana Ja’Rae, and Lydia B Kollins; Volume 2 - Acacia Forgot, Kori King, Lexi Love, Onya Nurve, Sam Star, and Suzie Toot; On the runway, category is Quilted For Your Pleasure. Crystal Envy, Onya Nurve, and Suzie Toot receive positive critiques, with Onya Nurve winning the challenge. Arrietty, Joella, and Kori King receive negative critiques, with Arrietty being safe. Joella and Kori King lip-sync to "Buttons" by the Pussycat Dolls featuring Snoop Dogg. Kori King wins the lip-sync. Joella pulls the 6th lever of the "Badonka Dunk", failing to dunk Michelle into the water and sashays away.: Guest Judge: Julia Schlaepfer; Alternating Judge: Carson Kressley; Main Challenge: Film commercials based on past Drag Race contestants; Runway Theme: Quilted For Your Pleasure; Challenge Winner: Onya Nurve; Challenge Prize: $5,000 cash prize; Bottom Two: Joella and Kori King; Lip-sync Song: "Buttons" by the Pussycat Dolls featuring Snoop Dogg; Eliminated: Joella; Farewell Message: "Visit me when you come back to LA ♡♡♡ - J.O.E Dont forget the ella!"
228	5	"RDR Live!"	January 31, 2025
For this week's main challenge, the queens perform in a sketch comedy of RDR Live.: Host - Onya Nurve; Queen News Network - Crystal Envy, Lexi Love, and Suzie Toot; Neanderthal Town Hall - Arrietty, Kori King, Lana Ja’Rae, and Onya Nurve; Beaverologist Podcast - Hormona Lisa, Jewels Sparkles, and Sam Star; Emergency Room - Acacia Forgot and Lydia B Kollins; On the runway, category is Tickled Pink. Hormona Lisa, Onya Nurve, and Suzie Toot receive positive critiques, with Suzie Toot winning the challenge. Arrietty, Lydia B Kollins, and Sam Star receive negative critiques, with Sam Star being safe. Arrietty and Lydia B Kollins lip-sync to "Boogie Wonderland" by Earth, Wind & Fire and The Emotions. Lydia B Kollins wins the lip-sync. Arrietty pulls the 1st lever of the "Badonka Dunk", which dunks Michelle into the water and therefore saves Arrietty from elimination.: Guest Judge: Paul W. Downs; Alternating Judge: Ross Mathews; Main Challenge: Perform in a sketch comedy of RDR Live; Runway Theme: Tickled Pink; Challenge Winner: Suzie Toot; Challenge Prize: $5,000 cash prize; Bottom Two: Arrietty and Lydia B Kollins; Lip-sync Song: "Boogie Wonderland" by Earth, Wind & Fire and The Emotions; Eliminated: None
229	6	"Let's Get Sea Sickening Ball"	February 7, 2025
For this week's mini-challenge, the queens team up to transport Anastasia Beverly Hills lipsticks to a display case using only their mouths. Acacia Forgot, Lexi Love, Lydia B Kollins, Onya Nurve, Sam Star, and Suzie Toot win the mini-challenge. For the main challenge, the queens create three looks for the Let’s Get Sea Sickening Ball: Bathing Beauties, Sea Creature Couture, and Sea Sickening Eleganza.: Acacia Forgot - Feather Star; Arrietty - Lionfish; Crystal Envy - Pufferfish; Hormona Lisa - Leafy Seadragon; Jewels Sparkles - Spanish Dancer; Kori King - Mandarin Fish; Lana Ja’Rae - Purple Sea Urchin; Lexi Love - Purple Stinger Jellyfish; Lydia B Kollins - Anglerfish; Onya Nurve - African Sea Star; Sam Star - Viperfish; Suzie Toot - Coconut Shell Octopus; On the runway, Arrietty, Crystal Envy, and Sam Star receive positive critiques, with Arrietty winning the challenge. Acacia Forgot, Hormona Lisa, and Lana Ja’Rae receive negative critiques, with Acacia Forgot being safe. Hormona Lisa and Lana Ja’Rae lip-sync to "Get Him Back!" by Olivia Rodrigo. Lana Ja’Rae wins the lip-sync and Hormona Lisa sashays away.: Guest Judges: Hunter Schafer; Alternating Judge: Law Roach; Mini-Challenge: In teams, transport Anastasia Beverly Hills lipsticks to a display case using mouths only; Mini-Challenge Winners: Acacia Forgot, Lexi Love, Lydia B Kollins, Onya Nurve, Sam Star, and Suzie Toot; Mini-Challenge Prize: $500 cash tip; Main Challenge: Let's Get Sea Sickening Ball; Runway Theme: Bathing Beauties, Sea Creature Couture, and Sea Sickening Eleganza; Challenge Winner: Arrietty; Challenge Prize: $5,000 cash prize; Bottom Two: Hormona Lisa and Lana Ja'Rae; Lip-sync Song: "Get Him Back!" by Olivia Rodrigo; Eliminated: Hormona Lisa; Farewell Message: "Pumpkins, Never stop dreaming Never stop shining I will miss each one of you! <3 - Hormona Lisa"
229	7	"Snatch Game"	February 14, 2025
For this week's main challenge, the queens play the Snatch Game. Alyssa Edwards and GAY-I star as the celebrity contestants. The cast consisted of: Acacia Forgot as Trisha Paytas; Arrietty as “Baby Cupid”; Crystal Envy as Nicole Richie; Jewels Sparkles as “Miss Big Feet”; Kori King as Big Ang; Lana Ja’Rae as Rosa Parks; Lexi Love as Gilbert Gottfried; Lydia B Kollins as David Lynch; Onya Nurve as Eddie Murphy; Sam Star as Kim Gravel; Suzie Toot as Ellen Greene; On the runway, category is Nailed It!. Jewels Sparkles, Lexi Love, Onya Nurve, and Sam Star receive positive critiques, with Onya Nurve winning the challenge. Arrietty, Crystal Envy, and Lana Ja’Rae receive negative critiques, with Arrietty being safe. Crystal Envy and Lana Ja’Rae lip-sync to "Hands to Myself" by Selena Gomez. Lana Ja’Rae wins the lip-sync and Crystal Envy sashays away.: Guest Judge: Quinta Brunson; Alternating Judge: Ross Mathews; Main Challenge: Snatch Game; Runway Theme: Nailed It!; Challenge Winner: Onya Nurve; Challenge Prize: $5,000 cash prize; Bottom Two: Crystal Envy and Lana Ja'Rae; Lip-sync Song: "Hands to Myself" by Selena Gomez; Eliminated: Crystal Envy; Farewell Message: "Yeah, I'd still envy ME 💎. Love you girls ♡"
230	8	"The Wicked Wiz of Oz: The Rusical!"	February 21, 2025
For this week's main challenge, the queens perform in The Wicked Wiz of Oz: The Rusical!.: Acacia Forgot as Kansas Dorothy; Arrietty as the Scarecrow; Jewels Sparkles as the Good Witch; Kori King as a Flying Monkey; Lana Ja’Rae as the Tin Woman; Lexi Love as the Lioness; Lydia B Kollins as a Flying Monkey; Onya Nurve as Harlem Dorothy; Sam Star as a Cher-inspired Wicked Witch; Suzie Toot as the Green Witch; On the runway, category is Parasols, Shady Ladies. Jewels Sparkles, Onya Nurve, Sam Star, and Suzie Toot receive positive critiques, with Sam Star winning the challenge. Acacia Forgot and Kori King receive negative critiques, and are announced as the bottom two. They lip-sync to "Wet Dream" by Adam Lambert. Kori King wins the lip-sync and Acacia Forgot sashays away.: Guest Judge: Adam Lambert; Alternating Judge: Jamal Sims; Main Challenge: Perform in the Wicked Wiz of Oz: The Rusical!; Runway Theme: Parasols, Shady Ladies; Challenge Winner: Sam Star; Challenge Prize: $5,000 cash prize; Bottom Two: Acacia Forgot and Kori King; Lip-sync Song: "Wet Dream" by Adam Lambert; Eliminated: Acacia Forgot; Farewell Message: "All you can do is FORGOT. Love, The Piggie of the Week. -Acacia ♡"
231	9	"Heavens to Betsey!"	February 28, 2025
For this week's mini-challenge, the queens read each other to filth. Suzie Toot wins the mini-challenge. For the main challenge, the queens design and create outfits inspired by a Betsey Johnson collection.: Betsey’s Prom - Kori King, Lana Ja’Rae, and Onya Nurve; Prenup - Arrietty, Lexi Love, and Sam Star; Punk Grunge Flapper - Jewels Sparkles, Lydia B Kollins, and Suzie Toot; On the runway, category is Betsey Johnson Fashion Collection. Arrietty, Jewels Sparkles, and Lexi Love receive positive critiques, with Jewels Sparkles winning the challenge. Kori King, Lydia B Kollins, and Onya Nurve receive negative critiques, with Onya Nurve being safe. Kori King and Lydia B Kollins lip-sync to "Kiss Me Deadly" by Lita Ford. Lydia B Kollins wins the lip-sync and Kori King sashays away.: Guest Judge: Betsey Johnson; Alternating Judge: Carson Kressley; Mini-Challenge: Reading is Fundamental; Mini-Challenge Winner: Suzie Toot; Mini-Challenge Prize: $2,500 cash tip; Main Challenge: Create a high-fashion outfit inspired by one of Betsey Johnson’s collections; Runway Theme: Betsey Johnson Fashion Collection; Challenge Winner: Jewels Sparkles; Challenge Prize: $5,000 cash prize; Bottom Two: Lydia B Kollins and Kori King; Lip-sync Song: "Kiss Me Deadly" by Lita Ford; Eliminated: Kori King; Farewell Message: "Goodnight Kingdom☆"
232	10	"The Villains Roast"	March 7, 2025
For this week's mini-challenge, the queens return to the Badonka Dunk tank where Michelle Visage and Entertainment Weekly writer Joey Nolfi ask questions before dunking each of the contestants. For the main challenge, the queens will perform The Villains Roast of Kandy Muse, Mistress Isabelle Brooks, and Plane Jane. On the runway, category is Who Wears Short Shorts?. Lana Ja'Rae, Lydia B Kollins, and Sam Star receive positive critiques, with Lydia B Kollins winning the challenge. Arrietty, Jewels Sparkles, and Lexi Love receive negative critiques, with Lexi Love being safe. Arrietty and Jewels Sparkles lip-sync to "Ya Ya" by Beyoncé. Jewels Sparkles wins the lip-sync and Arrietty sashays away.: Guest Judge: Whitney Cummings; Alternating Judge: Ts Madison; Mini-Challenge: Questions with Michelle Visage and the Badonka Dunk Tank; Main Challenge: Perform a roast of Kandy Muse, Mistress Isabelle Brooks, and Plane Jane; Runway Theme: Who Wears Short Shorts?; Challenge Winner: Lydia B Kollins; Challenge Prize: $5,000 cash prize; Bottom Two: Arrietty and Jewels Sparkles; Lip-sync Song: "Ya Ya" by Beyoncé; Eliminated: Arrietty; Farewell Message: "As one smelly b**** to another, Onya please brush your teeth."
233	11	"Ross Mathews vs. The Ducks"	March 14, 2025
For this week's main challenge, the queens will act in a parody skit of Feud: Capote vs. The Swans, "Ross Mathews vs. The Ducks": Jewels Sparkles as Chicago; Lana Ja’Rae as Drippy Q; Lexi Love as Lisa Rimmer; Lydia B Kollins as Dr. Sniffy Scattington; Onya Nurve as Big Fupa; Sam Star as Shonda Cox; Suzie Toot as Felicity Slanderpump; On the runway, category is Black and White Ball. Lexi Love, Onya Nurve, Sam Star, and Suzie Toot receive positive critiques, with Onya Nurve winning the challenge. Jewels Sparkles, Lana Ja’Rae, and Lydia B Kollins receive negative critiques, with Jewels Sparkles being safe. Lana Ja'Rae and Lydia B Kollins lip-sync to "Unholy" by Sam Smith and Kim Petras. Lana Ja'Rae wins the lip-sync and Lydia B Kollins sashays away.: Guest Judge: Sam Smith; Alternating Judge: Ross Matthews; Main Challenge: Act in "Ross Mathews vs. The Ducks" skit with Ross Matthews; Runway Theme: Black & White Ball; Challenge Winner: Onya Nurve; Challenge Prize: $5,000 cash prize; Bottom Two: Lana Ja'Rae and Lydia B Kollins; Lip-sync Song: "Unholy" by Sam Smith and Kim Petras; Eliminated: Lydia B Kollins; Farewell Message: "My Top 6 Sisters... It has been the honor of my life. You're all so incredible, make them EAT IT Piggies! ♡ (P.S. Lana, I LOVE YOU)"
234	12	"Charisma, Uniqueness, Nerve & Talent Monologues"	March 21, 2025
For this week's mini-challenge, in pairs, the queens fill in the blanks to write the other queen's Drag Race bios. Jewels Sparkles wins the mini-challenge. For the main challenge, the queens work in pairs and write and perform an interpretative dance in the Charisma, Uniqueness, Nerve & Talent monologues. On the runway, category is Ugliest Dress Ever. Lexi Love and Onya Nurve receive positive critiques, with both queens winning the challenge. Lana Ja’Rae and Sam Star receive negative critiques, and are announced as the bottom two. They lip-sync to "Illusion" by Dua Lipa. Sam Star wins the lip-sync and Lana Ja'Rae sashays away.: Guest Judge: Jerrod Carmichael; Alternating Judge: Ts Madison; Mini-Challenge: In duos, fill in the blanks and write each other a Drag Race biography; Mini-Challenge Winner: Jewels Sparkles; Mini-Challenge Prize: $1000 cash tip; Main Challenge: In duos, write and perform an interpretative dance in the Charisma, Uniqueness, Nerve & Talent monologues; Runway Theme: Ugliest Dress Ever; Challenge Winners: Lexi Love and Onya Nurve; Challenge Prize: $2,500 cash prize each; Bottom Two: Lana Ja'Rae and Sam Star; Lip-sync Song: "Illusion" by Dua Lipa; Eliminated: Lana Ja'Rae; Farewell Message: "Keep on JA'REAMING. Live, Laugh, Lana."
235	13	"Drag Baby Mamas"	March 28, 2025
For this week's mini-challenge, the queens vote in rounds to assign superlatives to their fellow queens. Onya Nurve wins the mini-challenge. For the main challenge, the queens give makeover to their parents. On the runway, category is Drag Family Resemblance. Sam Star and Suzie Toot receive positive critiques, with Sam Star winning the challenge. Jewels Sparkles, Lexi Love, and Onya Nurve receive negative critiques, with Lexi Love being safe. Jewels Sparkles and Onya Nurve lip-sync to "1 Thing" by Amerie. Both queens win the lip-sync and no one goes home.: Guest Judge: June Diane Raphael; Alternating Judge: Law Roach; Mini-Challenge: Spill The T; Mini-Challenge Winner: Onya Nurve; Mini-Challenge Prize: $2500 cash tip; Main Challenge: Give makeover to parents; Runway Theme: Drag Family Resemblance; Challenge Winner: Sam Star; Challenge Prize: $5,000 cash prize (plus $2,500 cash prize for her drag member); Bottom Two: Jewels Sparkles and Onya Nurve; Lip-sync Song: "1 Thing" by Amerie; Eliminated: None
236	14	"How's Your Headliner?"	April 4, 2025
For this week's main challenge, the queens audition for RuPaul's Drag Race Live!, where they do a promotional photoshoot, film a promotional short video, get interviewed by Latrice Royale, and perform new single, "Gift Shop". On the runway, category is Opulent Outerwear. Jewels Sparkles, Lexi Love, and Onya Nurve receive positive critiques, with Jewels Sparkles winning the challenge. Sam Star and Suzie Toot receive negative critiques, and are announced as the bottom two. They lip-sync to "Love Child" by Diana Ross & the Supremes. Sam Star wins the lip-sync and Suzie Toot sashays away.: Guest Judge: Tracee Ellis Ross; Alternating Judge: Ross Mathews; Main Challenge: Audition for RuPaul's Drag Race Live!, including a photoshoot, interview, performance, and promotional video; Runway Theme: Opulent Outerwear; Challenge Winner: Jewels Sparkles; Challenge Prize: $5,000 cash prize; Bottom Two: Sam Star and Suzie Toot; Lip-sync Song: "Love Child" by Diana Ross & the Supremes; Eliminated: Suzie Toot; Farewell Message: "Getting the crown Just Got a LOT easier for y'all Love you girls ♡ -Suzie Toot"
237	15	"Lip Sync Lalaparuza Smackdown"	April 11, 2025
This week, the eliminated queens participate in a Lip-Sync LaLaPaRuza Smackdown. In the first round, Hormona Lisa gets picked first and chooses to pick the song, selecting "Say Liza (Liza with a Z)" by Liza Minnelli. Lydia B. Kollins is chosen as her opponent. Lydia B. Kollins wins the lip-sync and Hormona Lisa loses. Suzie Toot is next to be picked and chooses Joella to lip-sync against. Joella then selects "Training Season" by Dua Lipa. Suzie Toot wins the lip-sync and Joella loses. Lucky Starzzz is next to be picked and chooses to pick the song, selecting "Step By Step (Junior Vasquez Tribal X Beats)" by Whitney Houston. Acacia Forgot is chosen as her opponent. Lucky Starzzz wins the lip-sync and Acacia Forgot loses. Arrietty gets picked next and chooses to pick the song, selecting “Blow Me (One Last Kiss)” by P!nk. Kori King is chosen as her opponent. Kori King wins the lip-sync and Arrietty loses. The final two queens, Lana Ja’Rae and Crystal Envy, lip-sync to "You Make Me Feel (Mighty Real)" by Sylvester chosen by Lana Ja’Rae. Lana Ja’Rae wins the lip-sync and Crystal Envy loses. In the second round, Lucky Starzzz is picked first and chooses to pick the song, selecting "We Found Love" by Rihanna. Suzie Toot is chosen as her opponent. Suzie Toot wins the lip-sync and Lucky Starzzz loses. The final three queens, Lana Ja’Rae, Lydia B. Kollins and Kori King, lip-sync to "360" by Charli XCX. Kori King wins the lip-sync and Lana Ja’Rae and Lydia B. Kollins lose. In the final round, Suzie Toot and Kori King lip-sync to "APT." by Rosé and Bruno Mars. Suzie Toot wins the lip-sync and earns the title of "Queen of She Done Already Done Had Herses".: Alternating Judge: Ts Madison; Main Challenge: Participate in a Lip Sync LaLaPaRuZa Smackdown; Lip-Sync Songs: "Say Liza (Liza with a Z)" by Liza Minnelli, "Training Season" by Dua Lipa, "Step By Step (Junior Vasquez Tribal X Beats)" by Whitney Houston, “Blow Me (One Last Kiss)” by P!nk, "You Make Me Feel (Mighty Real)" by Sylvester, "We Found Love" by Rihanna, "360" by Charli XCX, "APT." by Rosé and Bruno Mars; Round 1 Lip-Sync Winners: Lydia B. Kollins, Suzie Toot, Lucky Starzzz, Kori King, Lana Ja’Rae; Round 2 Lip-Sync Winners: Suzie Toot and Kori King; Queen of She Done Already Done Had Herses: Suzie Toot
238	16	"Grand Finale"	April 18, 2025
All the queens return for the grand finale. The final four queens then perform to a song that was written specifically for them. Jewels Sparkles lip-syncs to "Ding", Lexi Love lip-syncs to "Classic", Onya Nurve lip-syncs to "It Do Take Nurve", and Sam Star lip-syncs to "STAR". After their performances, RuPaul tells the queens that only two queens will be advancing to the final lip-sync of the season. It is announced that the final two queens are Jewels Sparkles and Onya Nurve, meaning Lexi Love and Sam Star are eliminated. It is then announced that Crystal Envy is this season's Miss Congeniality. Jewels Sparkles and Onya Nurve lip-sync to "Abracadabra" by Lady Gaga. It is announced that Onya Nurve is the winner, leaving Jewels Sparkles as the runner-up.: Alternating Judges: Carson Kressley and Jamal Sims; Final Four: Jewels Sparkles, Lexi Love, Onya Nurve, and Sam Star; Eliminated: Lexi Love and Sam Star; Miss Congeniality: Crystal Envy; Final Two: Jewels Sparkles and Onya Nurve; Lip-Sync Song: "Abracadabra" by Lady Gaga; Runner-up: Jewels Sparkles; Winner of RuPaul's Drag Race Season Seventeen: Onya Nurve

== Broadcast ==
The seventeenth season, and its companion series, premiered through MTV with its first episode on January 3, 2025. The season consisted of sixteen episodes and aired weekly at 8:00 p.m. (EST). Episodes were later released throughout various streaming services such as Crave for Canada, Stan for Australia, and on WOW Presents Plus internationally with next-day availability starting on January 4.

== Ratings ==
Viewership and ratings per episode of RuPaul's Drag Race season 17
No.	Title	Air date	Rating (18–49)	Viewers (millions)	Ref.
1	"Squirrel Games"	January 3, 2025	0.24	0.671	
2	"Drag Queens Got Talent – Part 2"	January 10, 2025	0.17	0.494	
3	"Monopulence!"	January 17, 2025	0.24	0.564	
4	"Bitch, I'm a Drag Queen!"	January 24, 2025	0.20	0.556	
5	"RDR Live!"	January 31, 2025	0.22	0.456	
6	"Let's Get Sea Sickening Ball"	February 7, 2025	0.20	0.530	
7	"Snatch Game"	February 14, 2025	0.12	0.429	
8	"The Wicked Wiz of Oz: The Rusical"	February 21, 2025	0.18	0.984	
9	"Heavens to Betsey!"	February 28, 2025	0.17	0.513	
10	"The Villains Roast"	March 7, 2025	0.22	0.870	
11	"Ross Mathews vs. The Ducks"	March 14, 2025	0.24	0.591	
12	"Charisma, Uniqueness, Nerve & Talent Monologues"	March 21, 2025	0.22	0.564	
13	"Drag Baby Mamas"	March 28, 2025	0.17	0.526	
14	"How's Your Headliner?"	April 4, 2025	0.14	0.424	
15	"Lip Sync Lalaparuza Smackdown"	April 11, 2025	0.17	0.794	
16	"Grand Finale"	April 18, 2025	0.22	0.867	

== Accolades ==
Name of the award ceremony, category, nominee(s) of the award, and the result of the nomination
Award	Category	Recipient(s) and nominee(s)	Result	Ref.
Primetime Emmy Awards	Outstanding Competition Program	RuPaul's Drag Race	Nominated	
Primetime Emmy Awards	Outstanding Directing for a Reality Program	Nick Murray (for "Squirrel Games")	Nominated	
Primetime Emmy Awards	Outstanding Host for a Reality or Competition Program	RuPaul	Nominated	
Primetime Emmy Awards	Outstanding Lighting Design / Lighting Direction for a Variety Series	Darren Barrows, Gus Dominguez, Thomas Schneider, and Steve Moreno (for "The Wicked Wiz of Oz: The Rusical!")	Nominated	
Primetime Emmy Awards	Outstanding Makeup for a Variety, Nonfiction or Reality Program	Nicole Faulkner, Jen Fregozo, Natasha Marcelina, and David Petruschin (for "Bitch, I'm a Drag Queen!")	Nominated	
Primetime Emmy Awards	Outstanding Picture Editing for a Structured or Competition Reality Program	Paul Cross, Ryan Mallick, Jamie Martin, and Michael Roha (for "Squirrel Games")	Nominated	
Primetime Emmy Awards	Outstanding Picture Editing for an Unstructured Reality Program	Jimmy Bazan, Johanna Gavard, and Miguel Siqueiros (for "Drag Baby Mamas")	Nominated	
Primetime Emmy Awards	Outstanding Production Design for a Variety, Reality or Competition Series	Jen Chu and Gavin Smith (for "RDR Live!")	Nominated	
Primetime Emmy Awards	Outstanding Unstructured Reality Program	RuPaul's Drag Race: Untucked!	Nominated	
Gold Derby Awards	Best Competition Program	RuPaul's Drag Race	Won	
Gold Derby Awards	Best Reality Host	RuPaul	Won	
