= Arrietty (drag queen) =

American drag performer (born 1996)

- Born: Luis Luviano; October 8, 1996 (age 29)
- Other name: Arrietty the Elf
- Occupation: Drag performer
- Television: RuPaul's Drag Race (season 17)

Luis Luviano, known professionally as Arrietty the Elf (or simply Arrietty; born October 8, 1996), is an American drag performer most known for competing on the seventeenth season of the television series RuPaul's Drag Race.

== Early life ==
Luviano is originally from Hesperia, California. He is of Mexican descent.

== Career ==
Luviano's drag persona is Arrietty the Elf, or simply Arrietty. She competed on the seventeenth season of RuPaul's Drag Race. On the fifth episode, she placed in the bottom two but was spared from elimination. Arrietty won the main challenge on the sixth episode. For the Snatch Game challenge on the seventh episode, she impersonated Baby Cupid. In the eighth episode's Rusical, Arrietty portrayed the Scarecrow. She was eliminated on the tenth episode, which tasked contestants with performing stand-up comedy in a roast of former Drag Race contestants. Arrietty stole jokes from fellow contestant Jewels Sparkles during the comedy challenge. She also left a "hateful" message about Onya Nurve after being eliminated and was deemed the "villain" of the season. Arrietty apologized to Onya Nurve on the fifteenth episode, when she returned to compete in the tournament of lip-sync contests ahead of the season finale. Arrietty's Instagram following grew by 476 percent while the show aired.

In Seattle, Arrietty performs at Queer Bar in Capitol Hill, Seattle and Dreamland in the Fremont neighborhood. She and fellow Drag Race contestant Acacia Forgot performed at White Center's Lumber Yard Bar in 2025.

Before pursuing drag full-time, Luviano worked as a dishwasher and as a retail worker for Target.

== Personal life ==
Luviano is based in Seattle and lives in the Capitol Hill neighborhood. He moved from California to Seattle in c. 2017 with his now ex-boyfriend after hearing that the drag scene in the city was prosperous.

Arrietty's former "drag mother" is season 15 contestant Irene the Alien (formerly known as Irene Dubois). The two have had a falling out, and Arrietty has apologized to Irene for comments made online.

Arrietty got her drag name from the Studio Ghibli film The Secret World of Arrietty.

== Filmography ==
=== Television ===
- RuPaul's Drag Race (season 17, 2025)
- RuPaul's Drag Race: Untucked (2025)

=== Web series ===
- Whatcha Packin' (2025), hosted by Michelle Visage
- Hello Hello Hello (2025), hosted by Kyran Thrax, World of Wonder

== See also ==
- LGBTQ culture in Seattle
- List of people from Seattle
