= Crystal Envy =

American drag performer (born 1997)

- Born: Christopher Cianci; February 8, 1997 (age 29); Staten Island, New York, U.S.
- Occupations: Drag performer; make-up artist
- Years active: 2012-present
- Television: RuPaul's Drag Race (season 17)
- Title: Miss Congeniality
- Predecessor: Sapphira Cristál and Xunami Muse
- Successor: Jane Don't
- Website: thecrystalenvy.com

Crystal Envy is the stage name of Christopher Cianci (born February 8, 1997), an American drag performer who competed on the seventeenth season of RuPaul's Drag Race, and received the title of Miss Congeniality for the season.

== Early life and education ==
Cianci was born in Staten Island, New York, and moved to New Jersey at the age of 7. He grew up in Jackson, New Jersey. He began doing makeup at the age of 13 or 14, met his "drag mother" Jade Embers on Tumblr in 2011, and started doing drag in high school as Crystal Envy Embers until stopping at the age of 18. He resumed doing drag in 2020, during the COVID-19 pandemic.

== Career ==
Crystal Envy is a drag performer who competed on the seventeenth season of RuPaul's Drag Race. She was the first contestant from Asbury Park to compete on the show. Placing eleventh overall, she was sent home after losing a lip-sync contest against Lana Ja'Rae to "Hands to Myself" by Selena Gomez on the Snatch Game episode (of the same name), in which Crystal Envy impersonated Nicole Richie. Before being eliminated, she had placed in the top three out of five times. During the finale, Crystal Envy was crowned Miss Congeniality. She additionally works full-time as a bridal and celebrity make-up artist, owning her own business. Through her business, she had worked with clients such as Dolores Catania.

Crystal Envy has competed in pageants, having been crowned Miss Paradise 2022. She is the fourth Miss Paradise to compete on Drag Race, after Honey Davenport, Olivia Lux, and Sapphira Cristál. Prior to winning the pageant, she had competed for Miss Glamorous Newcomer in Orlando, Florida. Her Instagram following grew by 160 percent while the show aired.

== Personal life ==
Cianci is based in Asbury Park.

Crystal Envy's "drag sister" is season 14 alumni Jasmine Kennedie. They are related through the House of Mandell, of which they are both members. Crystal Envy claims "house mother" Mancie Mandell as one of her drag mentors.

== Discography ==
=== Singles ===
- "Crystal Envy (feat. Jasmine Kennedie, Andrew Barret Cox & Peter Yang)" (2025)

== Filmography ==
=== Television ===
- RuPaul's Drag Race (season 17, 2025)
- RuPaul's Drag Race: Untucked (2025)
- RuPaul's Drag Race (season 18, 2026, 1 episode)

=== Web series ===
- Whatcha Packin' (2025)
- Hello Hello Hello (2025), hosted by Kyran Thrax, World of Wonder

== See also ==
- List of people from Staten Island
