= Acacia Forgot =

American drag performer

- Born: Tyler Heavner; October 9, 1996 (age 29); San Jose, California, U.S.
- Education: University of North Dakota
- Occupations: Drag performer; musician
- Television: RuPaul's Drag Race (season 17)
- Website: acaciaforgot.com

Acacia Forgot is the stage name of Tyler Heavner (born October 9, 1996), an American drag performer and musician who competed on the seventeenth season of RuPaul's Drag Race.

== Early life and education ==
Heavner was born and raised in a Minnesota-origin musical family in San Jose, California. After being homeschooled, Heavner studied music therapy at the University of North Dakota in Grand Forks. After earning a degree in 2019, Heavner worked at Mount Sinai Hospital's neonatal intensive care unit in Manhattan, New York as a music therapist.

== Career ==
Acacia Forgot is a drag performer who competed on the seventeenth season of RuPaul's Drag Race. On the show, she impersonated Trisha Paytas for the seventh episode's Snatch Game challenge. Acacia Forgot was eliminated on the eighth episode, which featured a Rusical, after placing in the bottom two and losing a lip-sync contest against Kori King. The character she played in the Rusical was based on Dorothy. Rachel Shatto of Pride.com said of her time on the show: "Acacia was initially on the quieter side, but by the time she sashayed out the door, she'd shared with fans her love of music, her comedy chops, her ability to read a sister for filth, and the health struggles that shaped her young life." As the season aired, Acacia Forgot's Instagram following saw a 694 percent growth from 6,700 to 53,200 followers.

=== Music ===
In 2023, Acacia Forgot released the extended play (EP) I Only Cry Rhinestones.

== Personal life ==
Heavner is based in Los Angeles, having moved there with their partner after living in New York City for four years. While on RuPaul's Drag Race, Heavner revealed being diagnosed and living with cystic fibrosis.

== Discography ==
=== Extended plays ===
- I Only Cry Rhinestones (2023)
- The Farm (2025)

=== Singles ===
- "No Crime" (2023)
- "I Only Cry Rhinestones" (2023)
- "The Farm" (2024)
- "Emerald Ocean" (2024)
- "Git On Gone" (2024)
- "Bulls" (2025)
- "I Never Win" (2025)

== Filmography ==
=== Television ===
- RuPaul's Drag Race (season 17, 2025)
- RuPaul's Drag Race: Untucked (2025)

=== Web series ===
- Whatcha Packin' (2025), hosted by Michelle Visage
- Hello Hello Hello (2025), hosted by Kyran Thrax, World of Wonder

== See also ==
- List of drag queens
- List of people from Los Angeles
- List of people from San Jose, California
- List of University of North Dakota people
