= Lana Ja'Rae =

American drag performer (born 2002)

- Born: Braylon Ja'Rae Jackson; May 7, 2002 (age 24); Dallas, Texas, U.S.
- Occupation: Drag queen
- Years active: 2021–present

Braylon Ja'Rae Jackson, known professionally as Lana Ja'Rae (born May 7, 2002), is an American drag queen who competed on the seventeenth season of RuPaul's Drag Race (2025), where she finished in sixth place.

== Early life ==
Braylon Ja'Rae Jackson was born and raised in Dallas, Texas. They first performed in drag while living in Oklahoma. While in high school, Jackson portrayed Miss Trunchbull in a production of Matilda the Musical.

== Career ==
In 2022, Ja'Rae appeared out of drag in a photography editorial for L'Officiel Baltic.

Lana Ja'Rae later appeared in a Pride campaign for British cosmetics company The Body Shop to involve customers to support the Equality Act for the United States. This promotional campaign featured two other drag performers, Angel Au and Makayla Couture.

On Drag Race, Lana Ja'Rae placed in the bottom two of the episode with the Snatch Game challenge. She defeated Crystal Envy in a lip-sync contest to remain in the competition. Her Instagram following grew by 147 percent while the show aired.

== Personal life ==
They are currently based in New York City. Their "drag mother" is season 15 alumni Luxx Noir London. They are additionally an open supporter of the Ali Forney Center. They cite their drag inspiration to be British model Naomi Campbell.

Lana Ja'Rae identifies as genderfluid and goes by she/her and they/them pronouns in drag; however, when not in drag, Lana prefers to use they/them pronouns.

== Discography ==
=== Singles ===
- "JA'REAM" (2025)

== Filmography ==
=== Television ===
- RuPaul's Drag Race (season 17, 2025)
