= Squirrel Games =

- RuPaul's Drag Race episode
- Episode no.: Season 17; Episode 1
- Directed by: Nick Murray
- Presented by: RuPaul
- Original air date: January 3, 2025

Guest appearances
- Angeria Paris VanMicheals; Aura Mayari; Jaymes Mansfield; Kerri Colby; Kylie Sonique Love; Mayhem Miller; Morgan McMichaels

Episode chronology
← Previous "Grand Finale"	Next → "Drag Queens Got Talent – Part 2"
- RuPaul's Drag Race season 17

"Squirrel Games" is the seventeenth-season premiere of the American reality competition television series RuPaul's Drag Race, and the 224th episode overall. The episode first aired on the cable network MTV on January 3, 2025. It tasks the contestants to perform in a talent show, after which the remaining contestants ranked their opponents. An episode was then followed from its companion series RuPaul's Drag Race: Untucked.

American singer Katy Perry appears as the guest judge, alongside with the regular panelists RuPaul, Michelle Visage, and Carson Kressley. Suzie Toot wins the main challenge after placing in the top two and competing against Jewels Sparkles in a lip-sync contest to Perry's song "Woman's World" (2024).

According to Nielsen Media Research (NMR), nearly 671,000 household viewers saw the episode, which gained a 0.24 ratings share among adults aged 18–49. "Squirrel Games" received positive reviews from critics, who praised its act parodying the South Korean, dystopian, survival series Squid Game (2021–2025). It ultimately earned nominations for Outstanding Directing for a Reality Program and Picture Editing for a Structured Reality or Competition Program categories at the 77th Primetime Creative Arts Emmy Awards.

== Episode ==
Fourteen contestants are taken to an undisclosed location, where they are joined by several previous competitors from the franchise. To continue in the competition, the drag performers play the children's game Red Light, Green Light. Instead of following the game's traditional rules, contestants must dance across a field, when music plays. When the music stops, the contestants strike a pose. The detection of any motion results in the player being pied in the face and eliminated. Afterward, the remaining fourteen contestants who "survived" the game are allowed to enter a workroom.

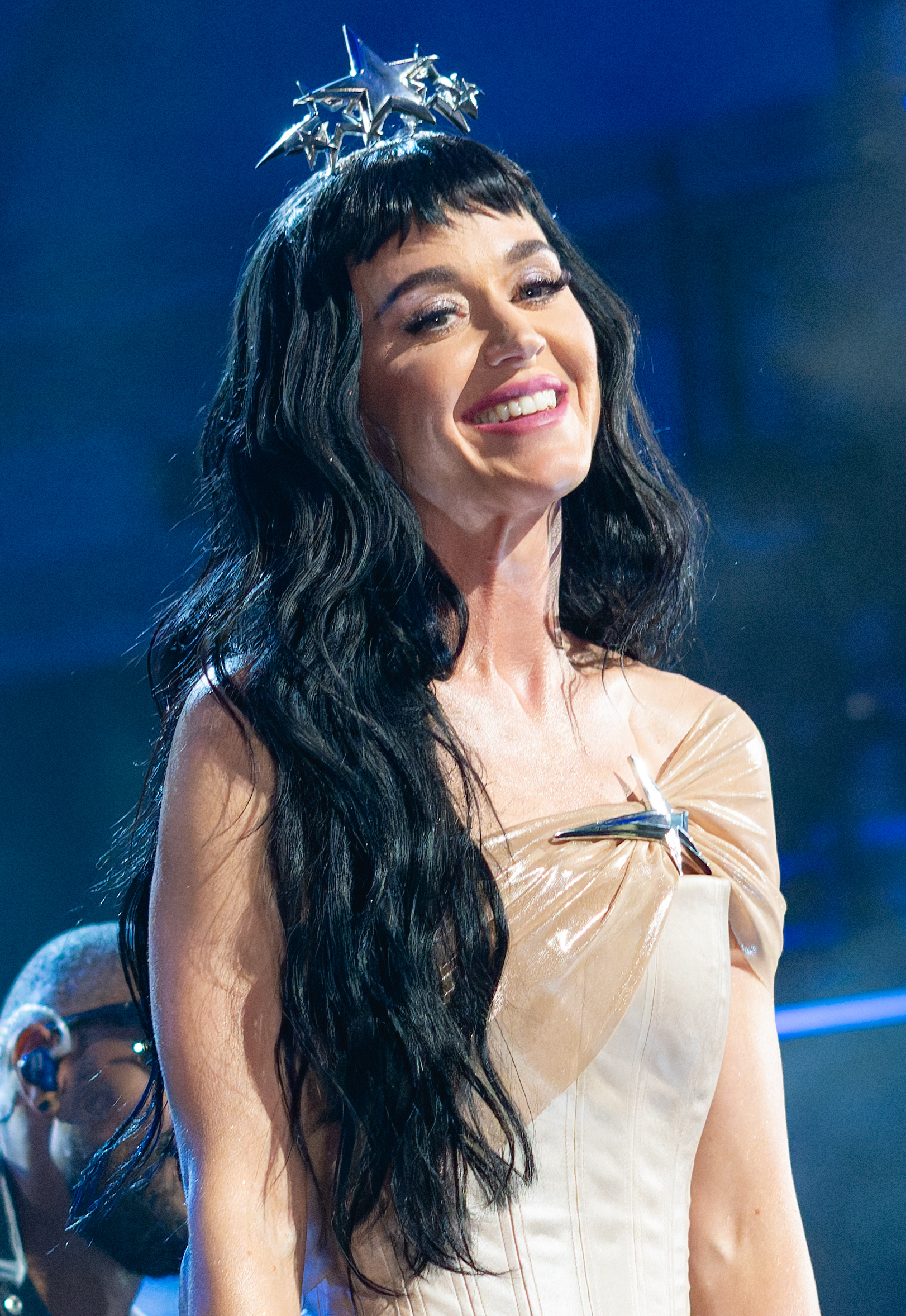
Katy Perry (pictured in 2024) is a guest judge.

As the contestants meet each other, RuPaul reveals they have unknowingly competed in their first photo-shoot mini-challenge. The winner is Lana Ja'Rae, whose prize is a cash tip of $2,500. RuPaul announces the first main challenge; contestants must form two groups to participate in a talent show that will span two episodes. The next day, as the contestants prepare for the show, American singer Katy Perry enters the Werk Room requesting tucking tape and immediately recognizes Joella. Perry offers the contestants advice for success.

RuPaul introduces Perry as the guest judge, alongside regular panelist Michelle Visage and alternating judge Carson Kressley. The runway category is "Masc for Masked Singer"; contestants must present mask-themed outfits. During the talent show, Acacia Forgot performs and plays a guitar and Arrietty dances baile folklórico (lit. 'folkloric dance'). Next are three original lip-syncs: Jewels Sparkles choreographs a milk-themed song, Joella performs a song about her drag name, and Lucky Starzzz lip-syncs about making lemonade. Finally, Lydia B Kollins performs a burlesque comedy routine and Suzie Toot performs a tap dance number that includes a joke about reciting the "Gettysburg Address" (1863) in Morse code.

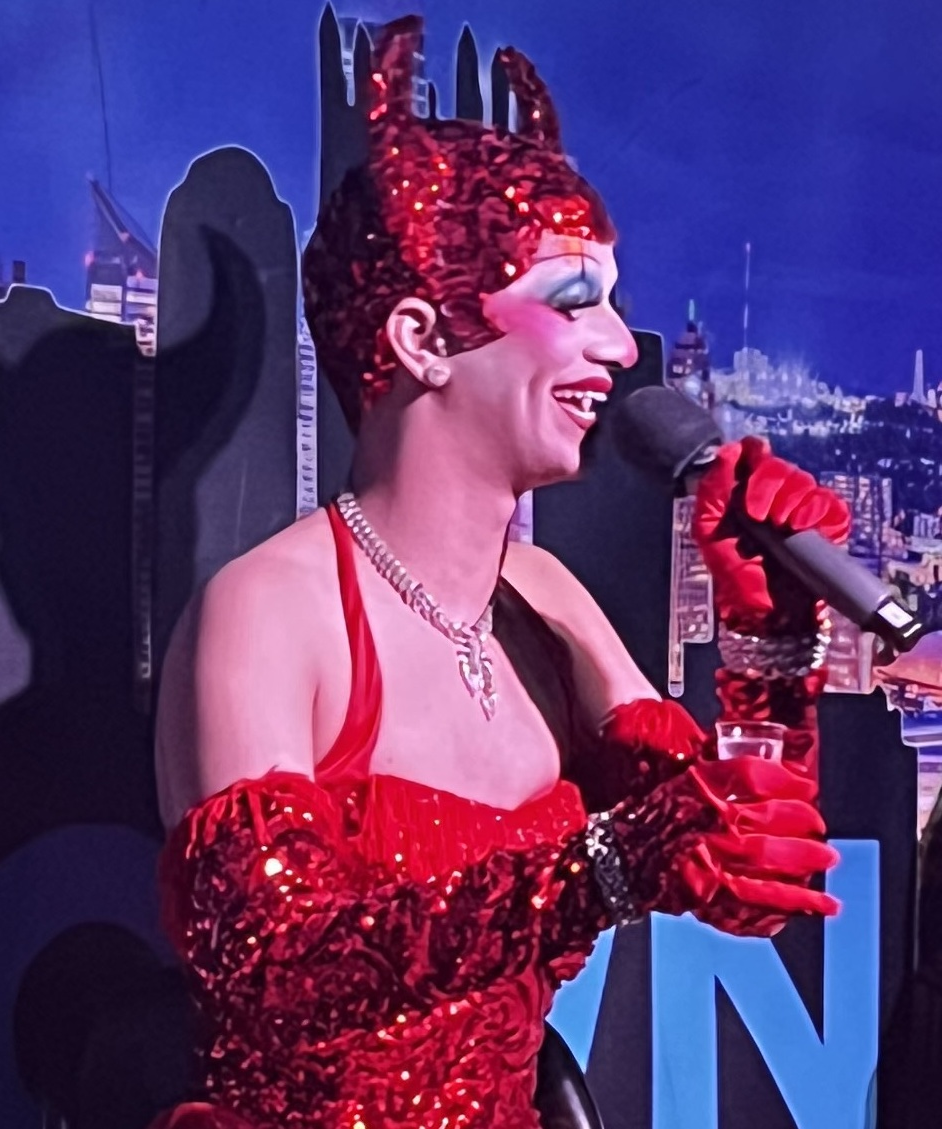
Suzie Toot (pictured in 2025) wins the episode's main challenge.

Acacia Forgot is revealed to be last in the rankings from her fellow contestants. She is told in next episode she will lip-sync against the lowest-ranked contestant of the second talent-show group. Jewels Sparkles and Suzie Toot are ranked as the top contestants for the week and must complete a tie-breaking lip-sync contest to Perry's "Woman's World" (2024). Suzie Toot wins the lip-sync contest and $5,000 in cash.

== Production ==
=== Development ===
"Squirrel Games" was previewed on December 12, 2024, in a lengthy promotional trailer for season seventeen; this trailer included scenes of the rankings format and talent show. A video of the episode's first ten minutes was released through YouTube; it showed the reappearance of Lil' Poundcake, a fictional character created by Alaska Thunderfuck and Lineysha Sparx in a previous season of the show.

The season-seventeen premiere episode was directed by Nick Murray. The episode opens with a comedic challenge and an ironic imitation of the South Korean, dystopian, survival series Squid Game (2021–2025). This coincided with the season-two premier of Squid Games, which was released a week before "Squirrel Games". There were cameo appearances made from past contestants Angeria Paris VanMicheals, Aura Mayari, Jaymes Mansfield, Kerri Colby, Kylie Sonique Love, Mayhem Miller, Morgan McMichaels, Trinity the Tuck, and Victoria "Porkchop" Parker.

=== Fashion ===
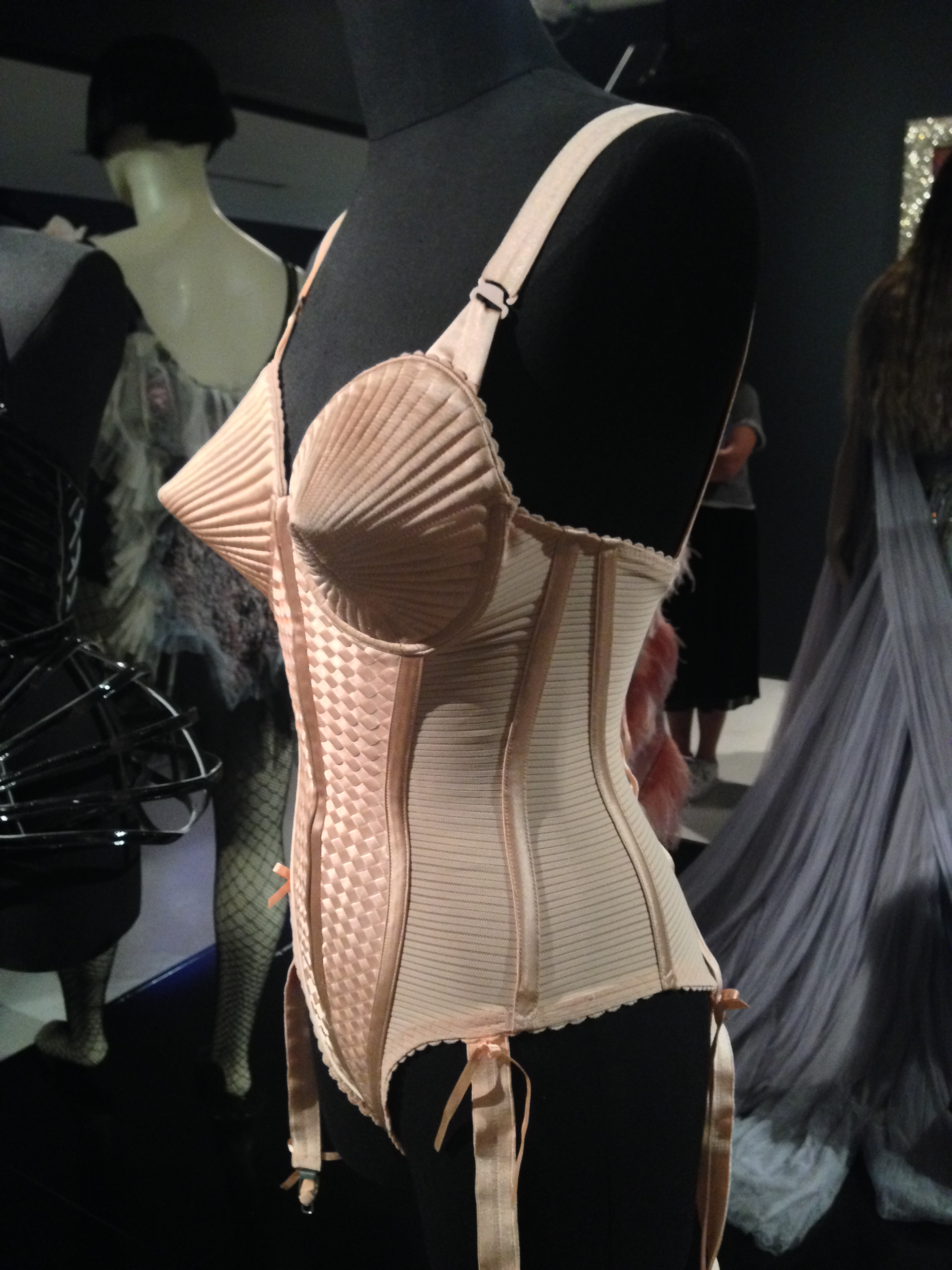
The conical-bra Jean-Paul Gaultier piece (pictured) resembling Katy Perry's oversized champagne gown.

Katy Perry enters the Werk Room in an all-black punk ensemble that resembles fetish wear. Her outfit includes sunglasses, a hoodie bearing the words "sex symbol", and knee-high boots. On the main stage, Perry wears a champagne "boudoir-inspired" outfit that resembles the Jean-Paul Gaultier pink conical-bra corset made for American singer-and-record producer Madonna. The "part-avant garde" gown was designed by Judassime. Perry's choker features an "oversized silver ring detail" that was customized by Zana Bayne.

For the runway presentation, Acacia Forgot wears a white catsuit with a grumpy snowman helmet and Arrietty presents a white mermaid dress, dripping in fake blood, with an arrowed mask. Crystal Envy dresses as a porcelain doll; her outfit reveals a mask that resembles a cracked skull. Hormona Lisa wears a black-and-white gown and a helmet resembling a skunk, and Jewels Sparkles showcases an Ariana Grande-inspired blue tulle gown with a masquerade piece. Joella wears an outer-space-inspired illusion catsuit depicting a crescent-moon disc, and Kori King wears a black feathered gown with a train, wearing a raven mask.

Lana Ja'Rae dresses as her cat Gouda, wearing a stoned catsuit with a cat mask. Lexi Love appeared in an astronaut suit that resembles the Moonman statue in the MTV Video Music Awards. Lucky Starzzz carries a pizza box and wears a pizza-inspired catsuit, and Lydia B Kollins wears a silver-stone dress over a black catsuit and a totem mask. Onya Nurve wears a beauty supply mask and a black, decorated dress with a red-orange train. Sam Star wears a rainbow, one-shoulder gown and a beaded cloud mask, and Suzie Toot wears a tuxedo mini-dress with a custom-made coin shield.

=== Broadcast ===
"Squirrel Games" was originally broadcast through MTV in the United States on January 3, 2025. The episode was seen by approximately 671,000 viewers, according to Nielsen Media Research (NMR). The viewership received a five-percent drop compared to its previous season premiere. The episode later released on January 4 through streaming services: Crave for Canada, Stan for Australia, and WOW Presents Plus internationally with next-day availability. This episode was released with others through video-sharing platform YouTube on June 2 as part of a "for your consideration" advertisement.

== Reception ==
Jason Frank of the entertainment website Vulture wrote he laughed when previous contenders were "pelted by pies" in the parody challenge. He described most of the talent show performances as "forgettable" and noted they did not "steal control of the camera's eye". Frank criticized the lip-sync song selection as "actively bad to the point of camp" that gave Suzie Toot an opportunity to win against Jewels Sparkles. Belen Edwards of the digital media platform Mashable enjoyed the lip-sync contest, in which Jewels Sparkles performed a flexible, "high-energy" choreography, adding Suzie Toot "breaks out a perfectly timed Charleston". Kevin O'Keeffe of the LGBTQ publication Xtra Magazine called the episode "solid" and said it "does a good job of introducing us to the queens, it breaks up the talent shows nicely and it’s just twisty enough to keep things interesting". The episode's lip-syncs were repetitive, but O'Keeffe soon realized "those performances win", mentioning the premiere episode for season fourteen.

"Squirrel Games" earned nominations in the Outstanding Directing for a Reality Program (for Nick Murray) and Picture Editing for a Structured Reality or Competition Program (for Jamie Martin, Paul Cross, Ryan Mallick, and Michael Roha) categories at the 77th Primetime Creative Arts Emmy Awards (2025). Both lost against to reality competition television series The Traitors (2023–present).

== See also ==
- Katy Perry videography
