= Monopulence! =

- RuPaul's Drag Race episode
- Episode no.: Season 17; Episode 3
- Directed by: Nick Murray
- Presented by: RuPaul
- Original air date: January 17, 2025

Guest appearance
- Sandra Bernhard

Episode chronology
← Previous "Drag Queens Got Talent – Part 2"	Next → "Bitch, I'm a Drag Queen!"
- RuPaul's Drag Race season 17

"Monopulence!" is the third episode of the seventeenth season of the American reality competition television series RuPaul's Drag Race, and the 226th episode overall. The episode first aired through cable network MTV on January 17, 2025. It was followed by an episode of the companion series RuPaul's Drag Race: Untucked. The episode's main challenge tasks contestants with designing a monochromatic outfit inspired from board game Monopoly. Sandra Bernhard is a guest judge, alongside regular panelists RuPaul, Michelle Visage, and Ts Madison. Sam Star wins the main challenge. Lucky Starzzz is eliminated from the competition after placing in the bottom two and losing a lip-sync contest against Joella to "(It's Just) The Way That You Love Me" (1988) by Paula Abdul.

== Episode ==
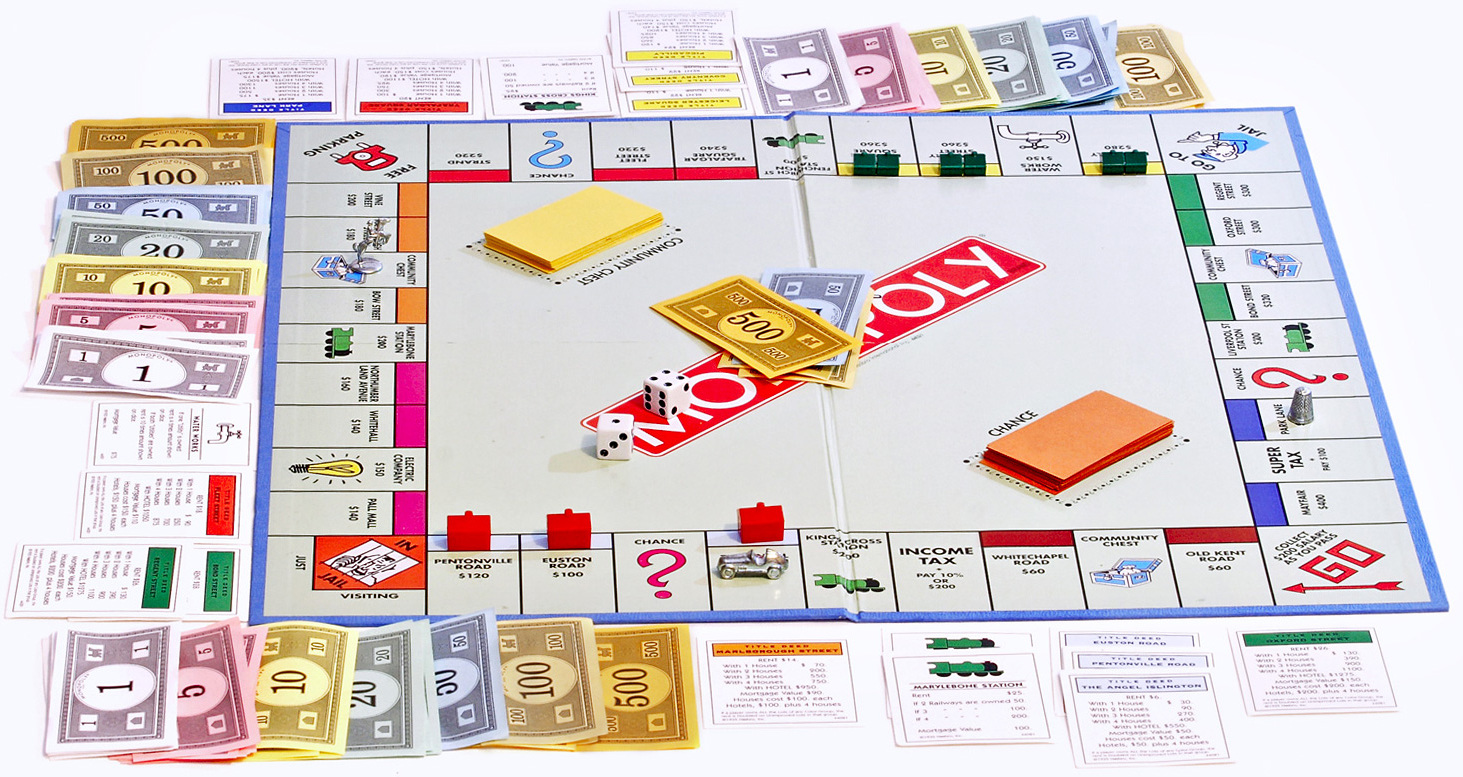
The episode's main challenge tasks contestants with creating looks inspired by the board game Monopoly (pictured).

All fourteen contestants return to the Werk Room after Hormona Lisa was saved from elimination because she pulled a correct lever on the previous episode. On a new day, RuPaul greets the contestants and reveals the main challenge, which tasks contestants with designing a Monopoly-inspired look for the runway. The category is "Monopulence". The contestants draw cards to win money and determine which color to use for the challenge, then create their looks in the Werk Room. RuPaul visits to offer individual feedback and leaves the results of the Rate-A-Queen votes. The contestants review the results together, then continue to work on their runway looks.

In the Werk Room on elimination day, Hormona Lisa removes rhinestones from her outfit, in order to comply with a rule requiring use of supplied materials. Jewels Sparkles and Onya Nurve have an argument over the latter stealing material from Jewels Sparkles, after Jewels Sparkles helped Onya Nurve with her outfit.

On the main stage, RuPaul welcomes regular panelists Michelle Visage and Ts Madison, as well as guest judge Sandra Bernhard. The contestants present their looks on the runway and the judges deliberate. Arrietty, Onya Nurve, and Sam Star place in the top. Sam Star is declared the winner of the main challenge. Joella and Lucky Starzzz place in the bottom and face off in a lip-sync contest to "(It's Just) The Way That You Love Me" (1988) by Paula Abdul. Lucky Starzzz loses and is given the opportunity to pull one of nine levers that may cause Visage to be dropped into a dunk tank. Lucky Starzzz chooses an incorrect lever and is eliminated from the competition. She returns to the Werk Room to write a message on the mirror using lipstick.

== Production ==
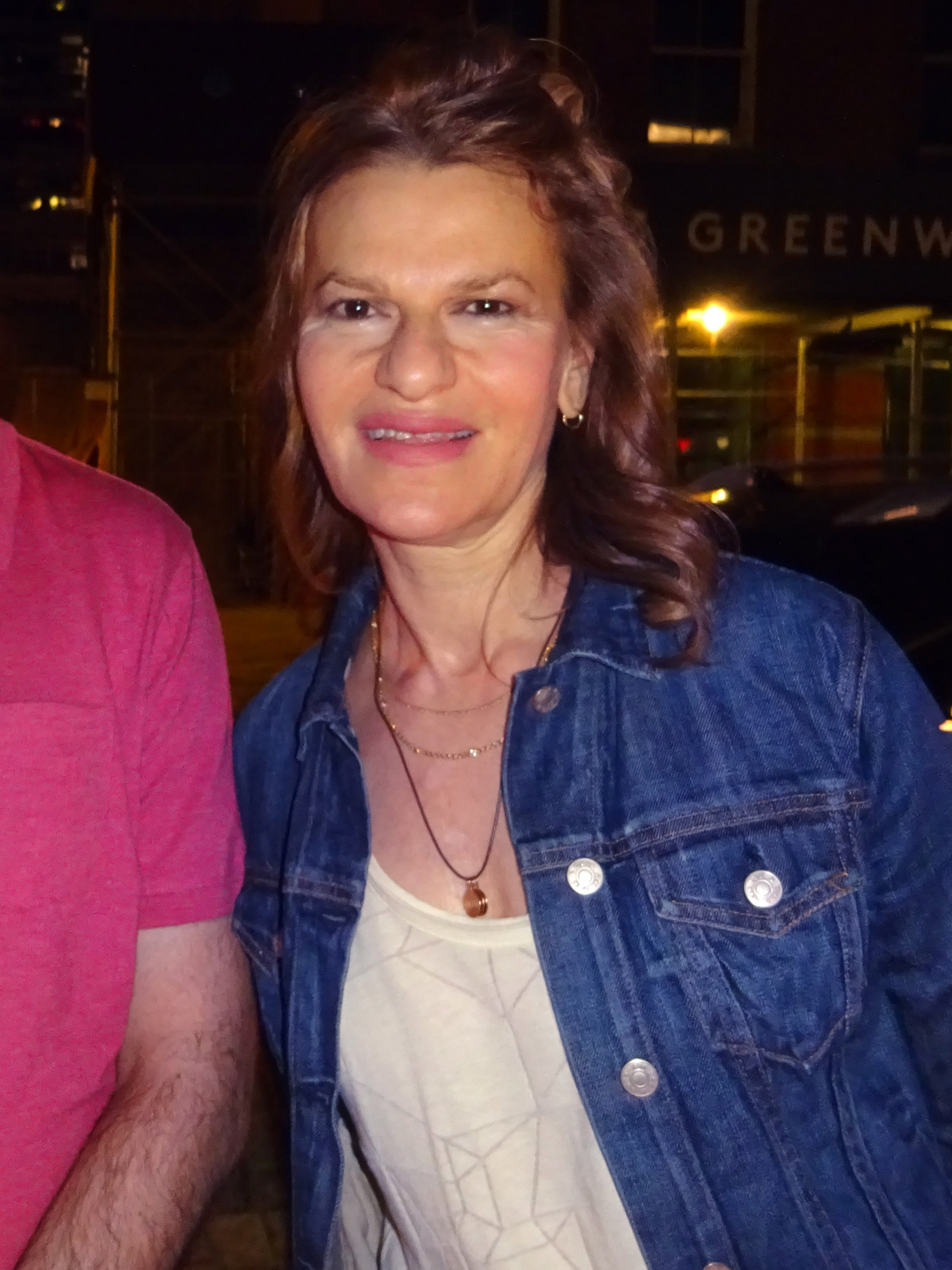
Sandra Bernhard (pictured in 2016) is a guest judge.

The episode originally aired on January 17, 2025.

Lucky Starzzz's exit line is "RuPaul, it's Starz-z-z-zah!". The message she writes on the mirror at the end of the episode reads, "Lucky Starzzzzzzzz was here! And don't you forget it! Keep on shining my 13 lucky stars."

=== Fashion ===
For the runway, Lucky Starzzz, Hormona Lisa, and Lexi Love present orange-colored outfits. Suzie Toot, Arrietty, and Lana Ja'Rae wear red dresses. Suzie Toot has a headpiece with devil horns. Acacia Forgot, Kori King, and Lydia B Kollins present yellow dresses. Joella, Onya Nurve, and Jewels Sparkles wear green dresses. Sam Star and Crystal Envy present blue dresses.

== Reception ==
Jason P. Frank of Vulture rated the episode five out of five stars. Stephen Daw of Billboard said of "Monopulence!": "Episode 3 is filled to the brim with classic Drag Race tropes audiences have come to look for, while also giving viewers some new moments of juicy drama in between. Bickering back and forth over the premiere's Rate-A-Queen rankings? Girls still somehow not knowing how to sew in season 17? A literal jewel heist? Yeah, episode 3 has everything." Daw ranked "(It's Just) The Way That You Love Me" fourteenth in the magazine's list of the season's lip-sync performances, writing: "Joella utilized the words to her advantage, kept the judges focused on her and pulled off a series of solid (and yes, basic) stunts. Lucky Starzzz gave a good effort, but her performance came off as sweaty and sloppy as she tried to pull out every trick in her bag to remain in the competition. Say what you will about Joella, but one thing is for sure — she cleared the boards with her Paula performance." Raja and Raven "tooted" Joella's look on Fashion Photo RuView.

== See also ==
- History of Monopoly
