= Bitch, I'm a Drag Queen! =

- RuPaul's Drag Race episode
- Episode no.: Season 17; Episode 4
- Presented by: RuPaul
- Original air date: January 24, 2025

Guest appearance
- Julia Schlaepfer

Episode chronology
← Previous "Monopulence!"	Next → "RDR Live!"
- RuPaul's Drag Race season 17

"Bitch, I'm a Drag Queen!" is the fourth episode of the seventeenth season of the American television series RuPaul's Drag Race. It originally aired on January 24, 2025. American actress Julia Schlaepfer is a guest judge.

The episode's main challenge tasks contestants with recording vocals and creating commercials for compilation albums inspired by past moments on the show. Onya Nurve is the winner of the main challenge. Joella is eliminated from the competition after placing in the bottom two and losing a lip-sync contest against Kori King to "Buttons" by the Pussycat Dolls featuring Snoop Dogg.

The episode earned make-up artists nominations in the Outstanding Makeup for a Variety, Nonfiction or Reality Program category at the 77th Primetime Creative Arts Emmy Awards.

== Episode ==
The contestants return to the Werk Room after the elimination of Lucky Starzzz on the previous episode. On a new day, RuPaul greets the contestants and reveals the episode's main challenge: to record vocals and create commercials for two compilation albums inspired by past moments on the show. The contestants draw cards to determine which tracks to perform.

Following are the tracks for Volume 1:

- Arrietty and Jewels Sparkles – "Backrolls", inspired by Alyssa Edwards and Jade Jolie on season 5
- Crystal Envy – "Unprofessional", inspired by Latrice Royale on season 4
- Hormona Lisa – "I Nominate Myself", inspired by Shannel on season 1
- Joella – "We Write the Stories", inspired by Mariah Paris Balenciaga on season 3
- Lana Ja'Rae and Lydia B Kollins – "No Class, No Manners", inspired by Morgan McMichaels and Mystique Summers Madison on season 2

Following are the tracks for Volume 2:

- Acacia Forgot and Sam Star – "Star Quality", inspired by Kandy Muse and Tamisha Iman on season 13
- Kori King – "Glamazon Bitch", inspired by Kennedy Davenport on season 7
- Lexi Love – "This Is Your Moment", inspired by Jasmine Kennedie on season 14
- Onya Nurve – "Put Your Lighters Up", inspired by Laganja Estranja on season 6
- Suzie Toot – "You're Perfect", inspired by Aja on season 9

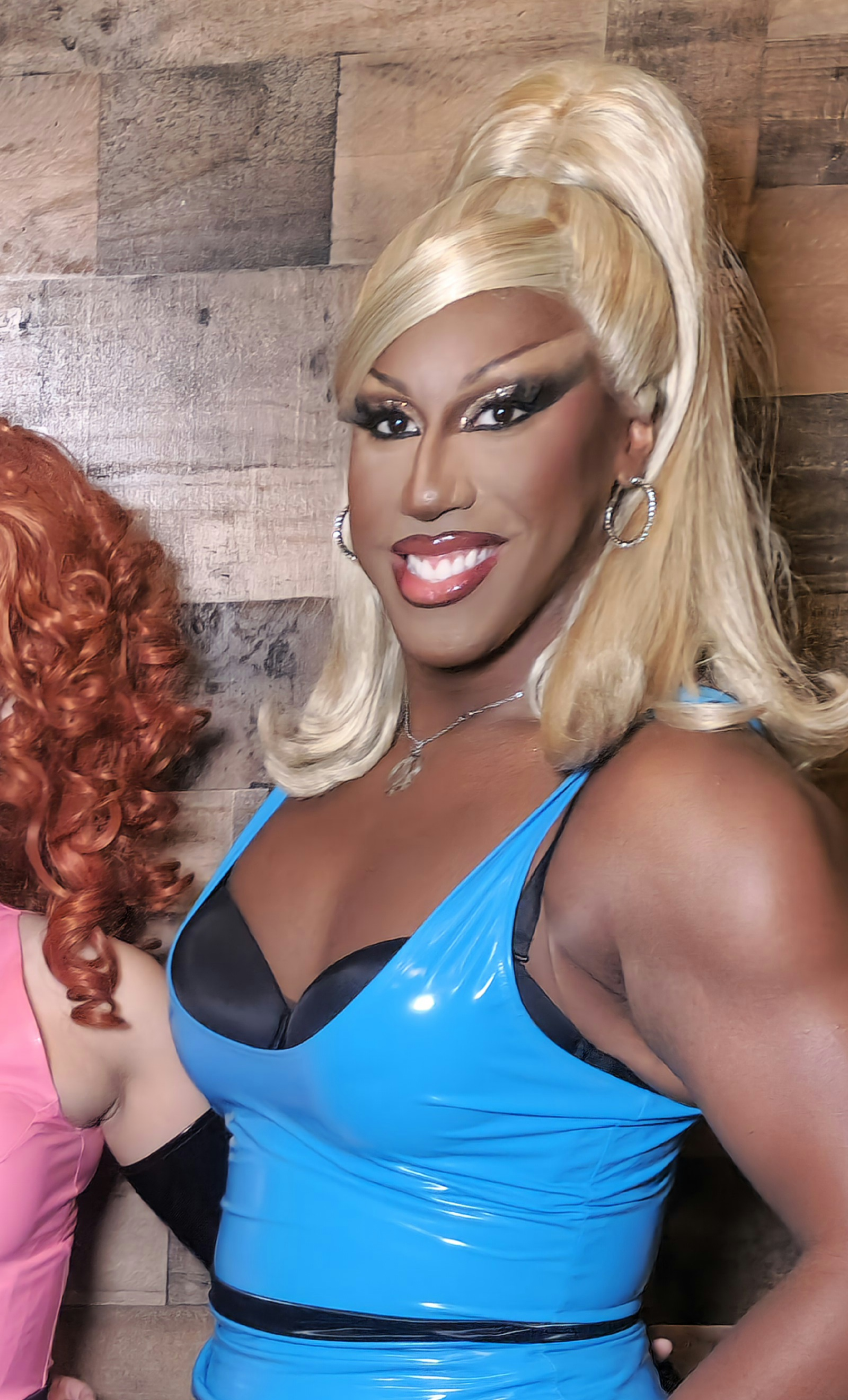
Contestant Kori King (pictured in 2025) places in the bottom two of the main challenge and wins a lip-sync contestant against Joella to remain in the competition.

The two teams listen to the songs then shoot the commercials. Back in the Werk Room, the contestants prepare for the runway. Lexi Love shares her experience starting drag out of necessity after she left home as a teenager. Onya Nurve discusses how her heritage inspires her drag. On the runway, RuPaul welcomes fellow panelists Michelle Visage, Carson Kressley, and guest judge Julia Schlaepfer, and reveals the runway category to be "quilted for your pleasure".

The contestants and judges watch the two commercials. RuPaul dismisses the safe contestants and the judges shares their critiques for the top and bottom contestants. Onya Nurve is declared the winner of the main challenge. Joella and Kori King place in the bottom two and face off to a lip-sync contest to "Buttons" (2006) by the Pussycat Dolls featuring Snoop Dogg. Kori King is declared the winner of the lip-sync. Since Joella is unsuccessful in selecting a correct lever to drop Visage into a dunk tank, Joella is eliminated from the competition.

== Production ==
The episode originally aired on January 24, 2025.

=== Fashion ===
For the runway, Lydia B Kollins wears a cat-inspired outfit. Lana Ja'Rae wears a multi-colored short dress. Joella's outfit is a large mattress with a portrait of RuPaul on the back. Arrietty presents a black, red, and white dress. Jewels Sparkles wears a blue villain-inspired dress. Hormona Lisa's look is a tribute to Dolly Parton's coat of many colors. Crystal Envy's red coat is inspired by a dress worn by Gigi Hadid at the Met Gala. Suzie Toot wears a headdress inspired by The Lord of the Rings. Sam Star has a pillow headpiece and carries a teddy bear as part of her sleep-inspired look. Acacia Forgot's wig has doilies. Onya Nurve wears African quilts stitched together and a large afro. Lexi Love wears a black dress with rhinestones. Kori King's dress has a quilted hat, top, and train.

== Reception ==
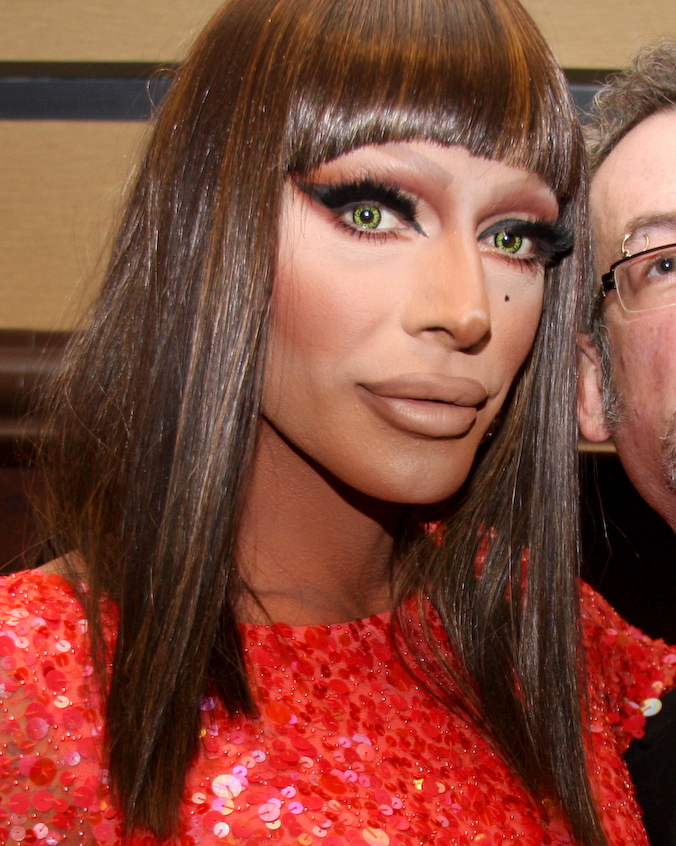
The episode earned former contestant Raven (pictured in 2012) and other make-up artists nominations in the Outstanding Makeup for a Variety, Nonfiction or Reality Program category at the 77th Primetime Creative Arts Emmy Awards.

Jason P. Frank of Vulture rated the episode three out of five stars. Stephen Daw of Billboard wrote about Joella: "Her performance in the infomercial challenge was forgettable (a mortal sin on Drag Race), her runway presentation as a giant quilted pillow/mattress/blanket was ridiculous in all the wrong ways, and her lip sync performance to 'Buttons' came apart at the seams." Daw also ranked "Buttons" number 21 in a list the season's lip-sync contests and said, "Joella's performance to this number was so bad that it almost swung back around to being ironically great by the end — but, when she was given a second chance at doing Snoop Dogg's verse, Joella simply shut down. Kori King easily won here, and even then we still weren't satisfied with the injustice done towards this all-time great lip sync track."

Matthew Huff of Parade wrote about Joella: "This week her 'We Write the Stories' homage to Mariah Paris Balenciaga was fine. But her terrible mattress look will almost certainly earn her the Golden Boot at the reunion. The fact that they made her stand on stage for so long while that costume continued to wilt was painful, but comedic gold from the producers as well. History was made." Kevin O'Keeffe of Xtra Magazine said, "It's a tragic end for the delusional queen, but also an expected one. Joella brought us tremendous entertainment to start the season, and we can only hope that someone else steps up to the plate to bring even half the meme-friendly antics for the rest of Season 17."

The episode earned make-up artists Natasha Marcelina, David Petruschin (a former contestant known as Raven), Jen Fregozo, and Nicole Faulkner nominations in the Outstanding Makeup for a Variety, Nonfiction or Reality Program category at the 77th Primetime Creative Arts Emmy Awards.
