= Lexi Love =

Lexi Love may refer to:

- Lexi Love (actress), American actress
- Lexi Love (drag performer) (born 1990), American drag performer
