= Television special =

Type of television program

A television special (often TV special, or rarely television spectacular) is a standalone television show that may also temporarily interrupt episodic programming normally scheduled for a given time slot. Some specials provide a full range of entertainment and informational value available via the television medium (news, drama, comedy, variety, cultural), in various formats (live television, documentary, studio production, animation, film), and in any viewing lengths (short films, feature films, miniseries, telethons).

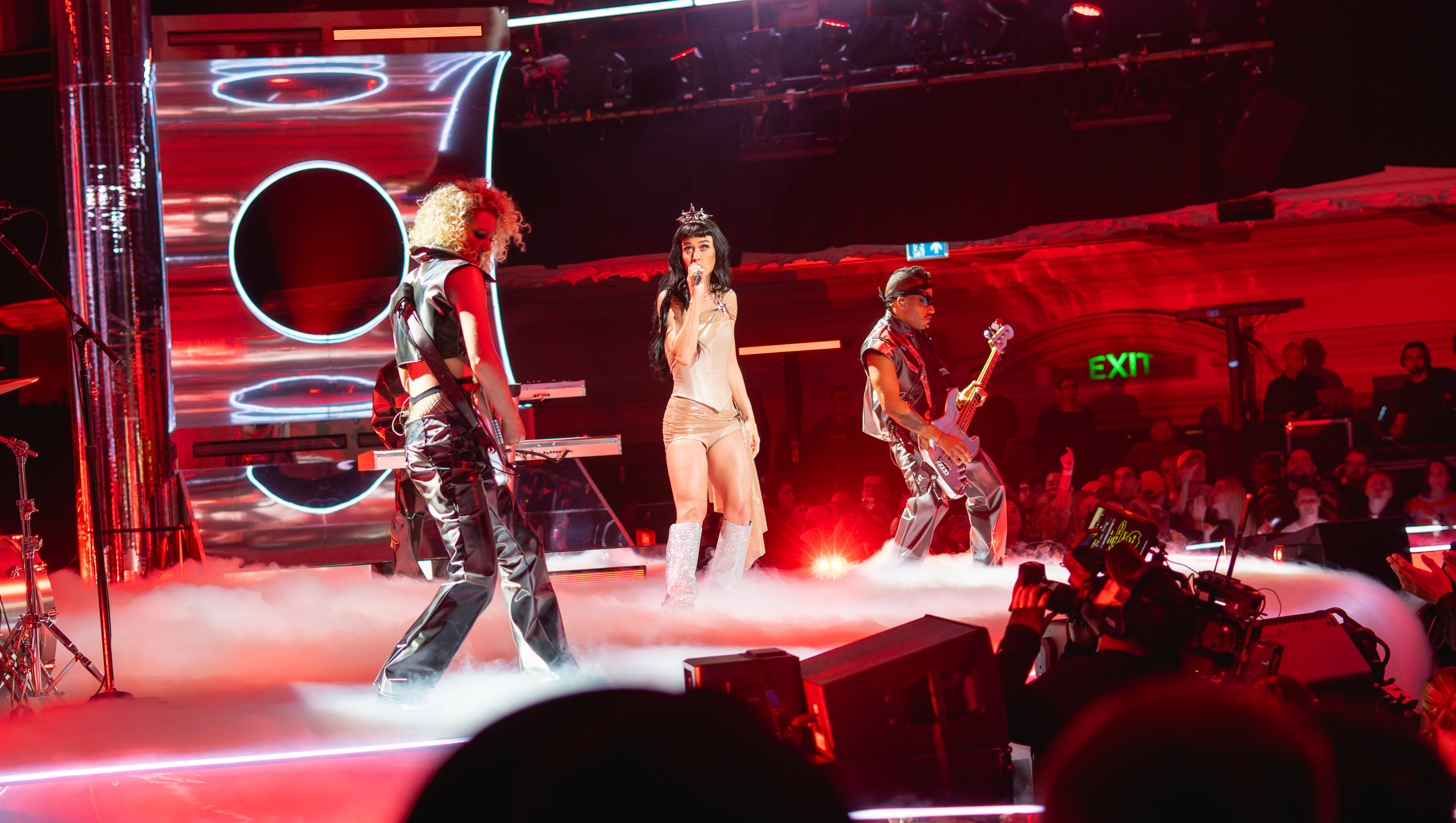
Katy Perry performing in the television special Katy Perry: Night of a Lifetime.

== Examples ==
Scenes from various Christmas and Hanukkah specials of series aired on the Nickelodeon children's network.

The types of shows described as television specials include:

- One-time comedy shows
- Extended episodes of TV shows
- Irregular professional wrestling shows: Saturday Night's Main Event, Battle of the Belts, Clash of the Champions
- Adaptations of operas, Broadway plays, and other musicals
- Celebrity profiles, interviews, or tribute specials
- Seasonal programs or parades: Christmas television specials, Macy's Thanksgiving Day Parade, New Year's Eve
- Theatrical films and "made-for-TV" movies: The Wizard of Oz
- Animated cartoons (shorts, more than two-part episodes)
- Irregular sports events: Olympic Games, Super Bowl
- Stunt events such as Evel Live, Red Bull New Year No Limits, Skyscraper Live (2026), and Fear: Buried Alive
- Beauty pageants: Miss America, Miss Universe
- Award shows: Academy Awards
- Religious specials: Catholic Church's Holy Year, Christmas, Holy Masses, New Year, Holy Masses, Holy Week Holy Masses, Urbi et Orbi Blessings at St. Peter's Basilica, Vatican City, Rome, Lazio, Italy and Other's, etc.
- Fundraising campaigns (telethons, pledge drives)
- On-going breaking news or event coverage such as the funeral of a major public figure or the wedding of a member of a royal family
- Promotional previews of regularly scheduled programming (such as Saturday morning preview specials)

== History ==
The production of early television shows was very expensive, with few guarantees of public success, and ongoing (weekly) shows typically required a single, major sponsor to operate. As such, a good deal of programming was one-off shows, accommodating smaller sponsors and not requiring a loyal audience following. As the industry matured, this trend reversed; by the 1950s, most networks aimed to provide stable, routine, and proven content to their audiences. Television executives, such as CBS president James Aubrey, sought to avoid any disruption in viewing habits which might cause viewers to move to another network. These weekly series, though, typically became too expensive for any single sponsor, so stand-alone shows offered a way to continue accommodating the single-sponsor practice, leading to shows like Amahl and the Night Visitors (1951, sponsored by Hallmark Cards as part of the Hallmark Television Playhouse) and the Ford 50th Anniversary Show (1953, a two-hour variety show simulcast on both CBS and NBC).

In 1954, NBC president Sylvester Weaver pioneered an innovative style of programming which he called "spectaculars". These stand-alone broadcasts, usually 90 minutes in length, were designed to attract large, new audiences and bring prestige to the network. The spectaculars aired on three nights every fourth week - a major gamble because it controversially broke up viewer routines and risked stable weekly sponsorship deals.

To address this, Weaver used his "magazine" style which involved selling segments of each show to a different sponsor, a practice which would evolve into the modern "commercial". The three initial spectacular blocks were Hallmark Hall of Fame (Sundays, produced by Albert McCleery), Producers' Showcase (Mondays, produced by Fred Coe), Max Liebman Presents (Saturdays, produced by Max Liebman). In time, the term "spectacular" was seen as hyperbolic, and so led to the more modern and modest term, "special". Weaver's strategy was not as successful as CBS's predictably scheduled and prefilmed programs, and he was fired in 1956.

In the 1960s, multi-part specials, which aired over several days in a week or on the same day for several weeks, evolved from this format, though these were more commonly called miniseries. The term "TV special" formerly applied more to dramas or musicals presented live or on videotape (such as Peter Pan) than to filmed presentations especially made for television, which were (and still are) referred to as made-for-TV movies.

In the era before cable and home video, television audiences often had to wait an entire year or more to see a special program or film that had a great impact on first viewing. Today, streaming media such as video on demand and streaming television, often makes it possible for viewers to watch a television special again almost immediately after it is aired, and home video—which has largely given way to digital downloads—makes it possible for the general public to own copies of television specials and films.

== See also ==
- Documentary film
- Event television
- Stand-up special
