= Big Easy Queens =

- Directed by: Erynn Dalton
- Written by: Robert Leleux
- Starring: Eric Swanson; Benjamin Shaevitz; Alexander Zenoz; Jennifer McClain; Matthew Darren; Jeffery Roberson; Christopher Hamblin
- Release date: August 26, 2023
- Country: United States
- Language: English

Big Easy Queens is a 2023 independent glam‑horror musical comedy written by Robert Leleux and directed by Erynn Dalton, starring Miss Bouvèé, Jennifer McClain, and star of RuPaul's Drag Race season 17, Suzie Toot.

Set in the sultry, eerie underworld of New Orleans and centres on Minnie Bouvèé (Miss Bouvèé), the Mob Queen of the Quarter, who ruthlessly murders the crew of her arch-enemy, Poodles Makenzie (Jennifer McClain). She prepares for the fallout, but she is taken by surprise when a spooky masked man stalks her, leaving behind ominous notes and bouquets of gardenias. Did Bouvèé's estranged sister, Mimi Bouvèé-Truve (Suzie Toot), steal her husband years ago and then abruptly returned into her life, or is this Makenzie's retaliation?

== Plot ==
Minnie Bouvèé, owner of the popular bar Dorothy's and known for defending her friends and customers from danger, has been receiving cryptic, threatening letters with gardenias. These are connected to a haunting recurring nightmare she had been having, and confides in her long-time assistant Giuseppe. Minnie is secretly having an affair with her ex-husband Jackson, who left her twenty years ago for her younger sister, Mimi Bouvèé-Truve. That very night, Minnie narrowly avoids being killed by a falling statue that was pushed by a masked figure. Giuseppe dismisses it as an accident. However, the scent of gardenias lingers, which deepens Minnie's suspicion.

Meanwhile, Mimi, aware of Jackson's infidelity, seeks help from the cunning Poodles Mackenzie. In exchange for financial support, Mimi agrees to become Poodles’ obedient “pet.” The next day, Minnie is attacked again, but Giuseppe continues to downplay it and suggest she's losing her mind. Later, Jackson is hit by a car in front of Mimi, traumatising her. She informs Poodles, who manipulates her into believing Minnie may have been behind Jackson's death and recruits her to spy on Minnie. Mimi is to tell Minnie that Poodles was behind it all, thereby gaining Minnie's trust so Poodles can strike from within.

Mimi does as instructed and is accepted back into Minnie's life. She begins working at Dorothy's and excels at managing the bar, earning Minnie's trust and gratitude. Their relationship strengthens, but they are attacked again. This time the masked figure is unmasked as Jackson, alive and well. Furious and betrayed, they realise Poodles orchestrated this and vow revenge.

Minnie finally opens up to Mimi about the nightmare that's haunted her for years. Together with Giuseppe, they begin practicing voodoo magic. They successfully test a spell that momentarily turns Giuseppe into a zombie-like puppet under their control, which can be reversed by snapping their fingers and saying “snap out of it.”

Using the voodoo ritual, they infiltrate Poodles’ salon. Minnie puts Poodles into a trance with the special herbs while Mimi sews her mouth shut. With control of a voodoo doll, they abduct her and confront her. Poodles denies plotting Jackson's death, claiming she merely had a vendetta against Minnie. As Giuseppe delivers more gardenias, Poodles sneezes and reveals she's allergic to them, implying she isn't the sender. A note is found in the flowers, furthering suspicion. Mimi starts to believe Poodles, but Minnie stays cautious.

Then comes a twist. Giuseppe, with the help of his two boyfriends Jackson and Amos, who is Poodles’ assistant, reveals he orchestrated everything. The trio had formed a throuple and plotted to take over the quarter by targeting Minnie and Poodles, with Mimi as an optional casualty. Giuseppe lines the women up to execute them, but Poodles’ sneeze distracts the men. The women take the opportunity to fight back and kill all three.

Afterward, they reflect on how the feud was pointless and that there was always room for all of them. The film ends with Minnie and Mimi performing a heartfelt number together, watched by Poodles, celebrating their complicated but strong bond. It concludes on a happy note with the sisters embracing.

== Cast ==
- Miss Bouvèé as Minnie Bouvèé.
- Suzie Toot as Mimi Bouvèé-Truve, the younger sister of Minnie Bouvèé.
- Alexander Zenoz as Giuseppe, the assistant of Minnie Bouvèé.
- Jennifer McClain as Poodles Mackenzie, the arch-nemesis of Minnie Bouvèé.
- Matthew Darren as Jackson Truve, ex-husband of Minnie and husband of Mimi.
- Varla Jean Merman as Irlene and Amos, colleague of Minnie (Irlene), right-hand-man of Poodles Mackenzie (Amos).
- Christopher Hamblin as Mittens Lafitte.
- Dan Gagnon as Bearded Madame.
- Jason Hignite as Strangled Gangster.
- Willy Le Sante as Irlene's Boyfriend.
- Mike Maloney as Minnie's Attacker.
- Cameron Nolan as Minnie's Assassin.
- Christopher Pinto as Bullet Ridden Gangster.
- Brett Watts as Poodles' Prisoner.

== Production ==
Big Easy Queens was conceived through the collaboration of director/co‑producer Erynn Dalton and drag performer Eric Swanson (Miss Bouvèé), whose character Minnie was central to the project. The two connected over their shared performance backgrounds and Michigan roots, and swiftly moved from conversation to creative action, transforming the project into a feature within a year, shot over just ten days on a microbudget in South Florida.

The screenplay, written by Robert Leleux, leans into a film-noir, Southern-gothic tone inspired by drag-theater theatricality and classic noir structures. The set design, which was inspired by the New Orleans’ French Quarter, leans heavily into neon sleaze, blood-streaked alleys, and smoky voodoo dens, creating an atmosphere both outrageous and immersive. The visual palette and practical effects echo classic B-movie aesthetics, while the musical numbers, which were scored by Geoffrey Short and Adam Michael Tilford, inject bursts of theatricality. The film's aesthetic is deliberately over-the-top, with prosthetics, zombies, and elaborate drag costumes taking center stage.

Much of the camp energy comes from its ensemble cast, led by Eric Swanson as Minnie Bouvèé, Benjamin Shaevitz as Mimi Bouvèé-Truve, and Jennifer McClain as the deranged Poodles Makenzie. Mimi was originally supposed to be the twin sister of Minnie, but crew realized that it would be a lot of work and editing, and Mimi had already become her own character. Miss Bouvèé then reached out the actor, drag queen, and tap dancing icon Suzie Toot (Benjamin Shaevitz) to come read for the role of Mimi. And just after their first read, Suzie fell inlove and was obsessed with Mimi. The team also tapped well-known drag performer Varla Jean Merman for the role of Irlene, adding cult star power. Behind the scenes, Don D’Arminio, Steven O. Evans, and Matthew Darren were among the main producers helping bring the bizarre vision to life. Though created on a modest indie budget, the production maximized its resources to craft a film that celebrates excess in every form; stylistically, narratively, and musically.

Additionally, production details from coverage by LRM Online confirm Dalton's background in stage horror and note that this feature marked Miss Bouvèé's first film acting role, transitioning from cabaret to leading a genre-bending cinematic narrative.

== Release ==
Big Easy Queens had its world premiere at the Popcorn Frights Film Festival on August 11, 2023, where it won the Audience Award for Best Feature Film.

It subsequently screened at various genre and LGBTQ+ festivals, such as a special event screening on April 25, 2025, at Kauaʻi Community College's Prism Club, described as “80 minutes of pure queer horror”.

On June 3, 2025, Suzie Toot posted on X, announcing the internet release of Big Easy Queens, revealing that it would be available on Hulu to stream. The movie has since received a lot of praise from fans (mostly of Suzie's).
