= List of people from Fort Lauderdale, Florida =

The following people were born, or have lived in, Fort Lauderdale, Florida:

== Sports figures ==
Auto racing

- Hélio Castroneves, 2001, 2002 and 2009 Indy 500 Champion
- Ryan Hunter-Reay, 2014 Indy 500 Champion
- Sean Murphy
- Logan Sargeant, Formula One driver in 2023 and 2024

Baseball

- Richard Bleier (born 1987), MLB pitcher
- Luke Jackson (born 1991), baseball pitcher for the San Francisco Giants
- Michael Morse
- Matt Murton, outfielder
- Nick Rickles, catcher
- John Riedling, pitcher
- Anthony Rizzo, first baseman
- Ryan Shealy, first baseman
- Mike Stanley, catcher
- Anthony Swarzak
- Michael A. Taylor, outfielder

Basketball

- Ivan Aska
- Barry Leibowitz
- Scottie Pippen
- Mitch Richmond

Ice hockey

- Jayson Megna

IFBB bodybuilding

- Dayana Cadeau

NFL football

- Joey Bosa
- Nick Bosa
- Isaac Bruce
- Dennis Daley
- Abdul Hodge
- Michael Irvin
- Mike Mularkey, coach
- Brian Piccolo
- Calvin Ridley
- Asante Samuel
- Alan Veingrad
- James White
- Marco Wilson

Soccer

- Matt Clare
- Cory Gibbs
- Aidan Morris
- Christie Pearce
- Delentz Pierre

Tennis

- Angela Buxton (1934–2020), English tennis player
- Chris Evert
- Robby Ginepri
- Harold Solomon (born 1952), tennis player ranked No. 5 in the world in 1980

Wrestling

- Lita

== Actors and models ==
- Kaitlyn Ashley, pornographic actor
- Pat Barrington, actress, exotic dancer
- Angel Boris, actor, Playboy model
- Ricou Browning, director, actor, producer, screenwriter, underwater cinematographer and stuntman
- Mary Carey, pornographic actress, politician
- Sofia Carson, actress, singer
- Bob Clark, film director, actor, producer, and screenwriter
- Tiffany Fallon, Playboy model
- Jackie Gleason, actor, comedian
- Catherine Hickland, television actor
- Bailee Madison, actor
- Leslie Nielsen, actor, comedian
- Paige O'Hara, stage actress, singer
- Niki Taylor, model
- David Winters, actor, dancer, choreographer, producer, film distributor, director and screenwriter

== Musicians ==
- Cory Asbury, Christian musician, worship pastor, songwriter, and former member of the Bethel Music collective
- David Cassidy, 1970s teen idol, singer and actor from the Partridge Family, died there
- Sabrina Claudio, singer
- Ian Grushka, bassist and founder of band New Found Glory (Coral Springs)
- Guitar Nubbit, blues musician
- Marilyn Manson, musician
- Dude Mowrey, country music artist
- Damien Moyal, vocalist and musician, notably of As Friends Rust, Morning Again and Shai Hulud
- Nonpoint, musical group
- Jaco Pastorius, influential jazz bassist
- Scott Putesky (Daisy Berkowitz), former lead guitarist for Marilyn Manson
- Puya, rock band
- Reggie Sears, R&B/soul artist, former child prodigy blues guitarist
- Archie Shepp, free jazz saxophonist
- Nadine Sierra, opera singer
- Ski Mask the Slump God (Stokeley Clevon Goulbourne), rapper
- XXXTentacion (Jahseh Dwayne Ricardo Onfroy), rapper
- Mark Zeltser, concert pianist

== Other notable people ==
- Cesar Barone, serial killer
- Edward Buchanan, Wyoming Secretary of State and former Speaker of the Wyoming House of Representatives
- James A. "Jimmie" Dallas, Sr., educator, entrepreneur, musical patron and civic leader
- Fred DeLuca, founder and CEO of Subway
- Arnold Denker, Chess Grandmaster and United States Chess Champion in 1945 and 1946
- Mario Díaz-Balart, U.S. representative
- Eddie Egan, detective and actor
- Lolita Files, author, screenwriter, and producer
- Brian Patrick Flynn, interior designer
- Leo Goodwin, Sr., founder of GEICO; philanthropist
- Wayne Huizenga, business/civic leader
- Travis Jeppesen, author
- Kenneth A. Jessell, educator and 6th President of Florida International University
- D. James Kennedy, televangelist, author
- Todd Kohlhepp, serial killer
- Frank C. McConnell, US Army brigadier general, retired to Fort Lauderdale
- Paul Miller, white supremacist internet personality, troll, and boxer
- Chesley V. Morton, businessman, former member of the Georgia House of Representatives
- Fan Noli, Albanian scholar and politician
- James Randi, magician, skeptic, and author
- Mark Sanford, U.S. Representative and former Governor of South Carolina
- Theodore Swinarski, Illinois state legislator
- Dave Thomas, founder of Wendy's
- Marion Wells, activist and president of the Marion G. Wells Foundation
- Dick Wells, businessman and philanthropist
- Garland Wright, retired rear admiral
- Suzie Toot, drag queen

== Fictional characters ==
- Kenny, video game character from Telltale's The Walking Dead
