= Drag Queens Got Talent – Part 2 =

- RuPaul's Drag Race episode
- Episode no.: Season 17; Episode 2
- Directed by: Nick Murray
- Presented by: RuPaul
- Original air date: January 10, 2025

Guest appearances
- Doechii; Lawrence Chaney

Episode chronology
← Previous "Squirrel Games"	Next → "Monopulence!"
- RuPaul's Drag Race season 17

"Drag Queens Got Talent – Part 2" is the second episode of the seventeenth season of the American reality television series RuPaul's Drag Race. The episode originally aired on MTV on January 10, 2025. It sees a second group of seven contestants participate in a talent show, with the season's other contestants judging via Rate-A-Queen. Joining regular panelists RuPaul and Michelle Visage are alternating judge Ts Madison and guest judge Doechii. Lawrence Chaney also makes a guest appearance.

Crystal Envy and Lexi Love place in the top two, with the latter deemed a winner following a lip-sync contest. Acacia Forgot, who placed in the bottom on the season premiere, and Hormona Lisa face off in a lip-sync contest. Acacia Forgot is declared the winner of the contest but Hormona Lisa is given a second chance to remain in the competition after she correctly chooses one of two out of ten levers sending Visage into a dunk tank.

== Episode ==
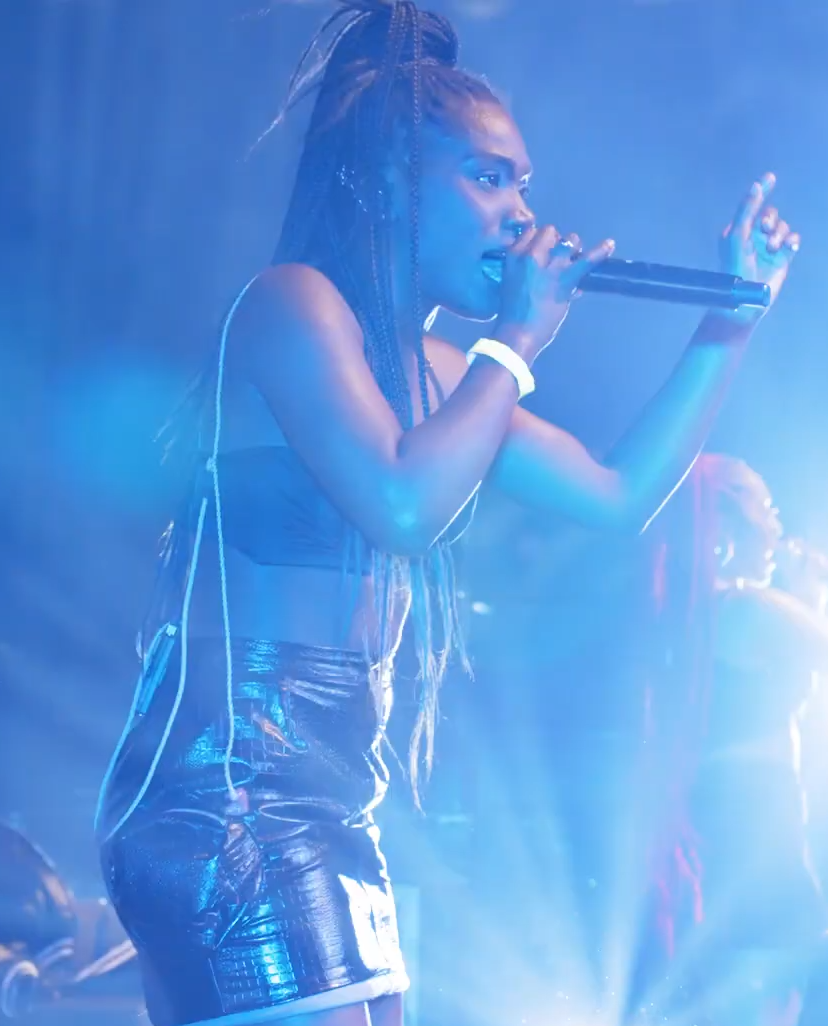
Doechii (pictured in 2022) is a guest judge.

The episode sees the second group of seven contestants (Crystal Envy, Hormona Lisa, Kori King, Lana Ja'Rae, Lexi Love, Onya Nurve, and Sam Star) participate in a talent show. In the Werk Room, Scottish drag performer Lawrence Chaney makes a guest appearance to reveal the runway category "Is it cake?", which tasks contestants with showcasing looks incorporating a buttocks reveal.

On the main stage, RuPaul welcomes regular panelist Michelle Visage as well as alternating judge Ts Madison and guest judge Doechii. The contestants reveal their runway looks. For the talent show, the contestants perform original lip-syncs with the exception of Hormona Lisa, who opts for stand-up comedy. Crystal Envy and Lexi Love are ranked highest by the contestants who vote via Rate-A-Queen. Lexi Love is deemed the winner of a lip-sync contest. Crystal Envy is declared safe and remains in the competition.

Hormona Lisa is ranked last by the contestants who vote via Rate-A-Queen. She and Acacia Forgot (who ranked last in the season premiere) face off in a lip-sync contest. Acacia Forgot wins the lip-sync and Hormona Lisa is given a second chance to remain in the competition if she pulls one of two levers out of ten that cause Visage to be dropped into a dunk tank. Hormona Lisa picks a correct lever and remains in the competition. The episode ends with an in memoriam message for The Vivienne, who died on January 5, 2025.

== Production ==
The episode originally aired on January 10, 2025.

=== Fashion ===
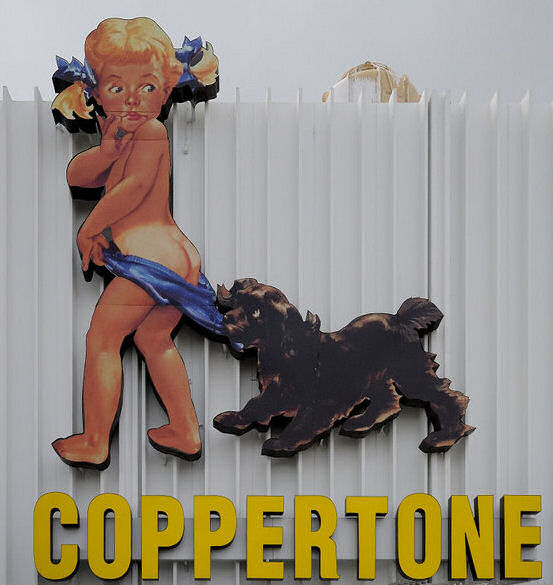
Crystal Envy's look was inspired by the Coppertone girl (sign photographed in Miami in 2009).

For the runway, Sam Star presents a wedding-themed look and Hormona Lisa's outfit is inspired by Marie Antoinette. Lana Ja'Rae's dress has a green leopard corset and Lydia B Kollins wears a red dress. Crystal Envy presents a "muscled, overgrown Coppertone girl" look, according to the Miami New Times. Jewels Sparkles wears a jumpsuit and Onya Nurve's look is inspired by the peach emoji. Lucky Starzzz has a sponge-themed look and Suzie Toot presents a more abstract interpretation of "ass" by theatrically drinking a potion to turn her from a maiden into a donkey.

== Reception ==
Jason P. Frank of Vulture rated the episode five out of five stars. Stephan Petar of IN Magazine said "Alter Ego" was among the season's best lip-syncs. Similarly, Sophie Baglioni of The Daily Tar Heel said "Alter Ego" was the best lip-sync performance of the season and wrote, "It's already a perfect lip-sync battle song, but both queens fully delivered each beat and lyric. It was truly a battle rather than just an individual performance, and it was apparent that their energies were working in tandem, which I always appreciate in a lip-sync battle."

Stephen Daw ranked "Yes, And?" number 22 and "Alter Ego" number 1, respectively, in Billboard's 2025 list of the season's lip-sync performances. He said of the former: "Acacia won this lip sync because she did something, whereas Hormona Lisa's approach to an Ariana Grande banger was … to sort of walk around the stage and kind of mouth the words. Meanwhile, Acacia didn't do much moving at all to this objectively upbeat pop banger — in part because her dress was likely difficult to move in — leaving us mystified as to how this episode could end with no one going home." He wrote about "Alter Ego": "When it's right, it's right, and this lip sync is just right. Every element you could want is present here; the song choice is excellent ..., the moves from both queens are perfectly timed (Crystal's flips and somersaults are astounding without feeling desperate); and the sheer attitude coming off both competitors is electric (Lexi literally starts the number with her middle finger up)." Daw opined, "Even Doechii herself was living for this number, clacking her fan along with every beat. Lexi and Crystal brought 'Alter Ego' to life with this high-octance, thrilling performance, and it still stands head and shoulders above the rest as the very best performance of season 17." Gay Times said Crystal Envy and Lexi Love "went viral" for the performance.

Out magazine said Doechii's song "took gay bars around the country by storm" when the episode aired. "Alter Ego" saw an increase in streams.
