= Lexi Love (actress) =

American actress and entrepreneur

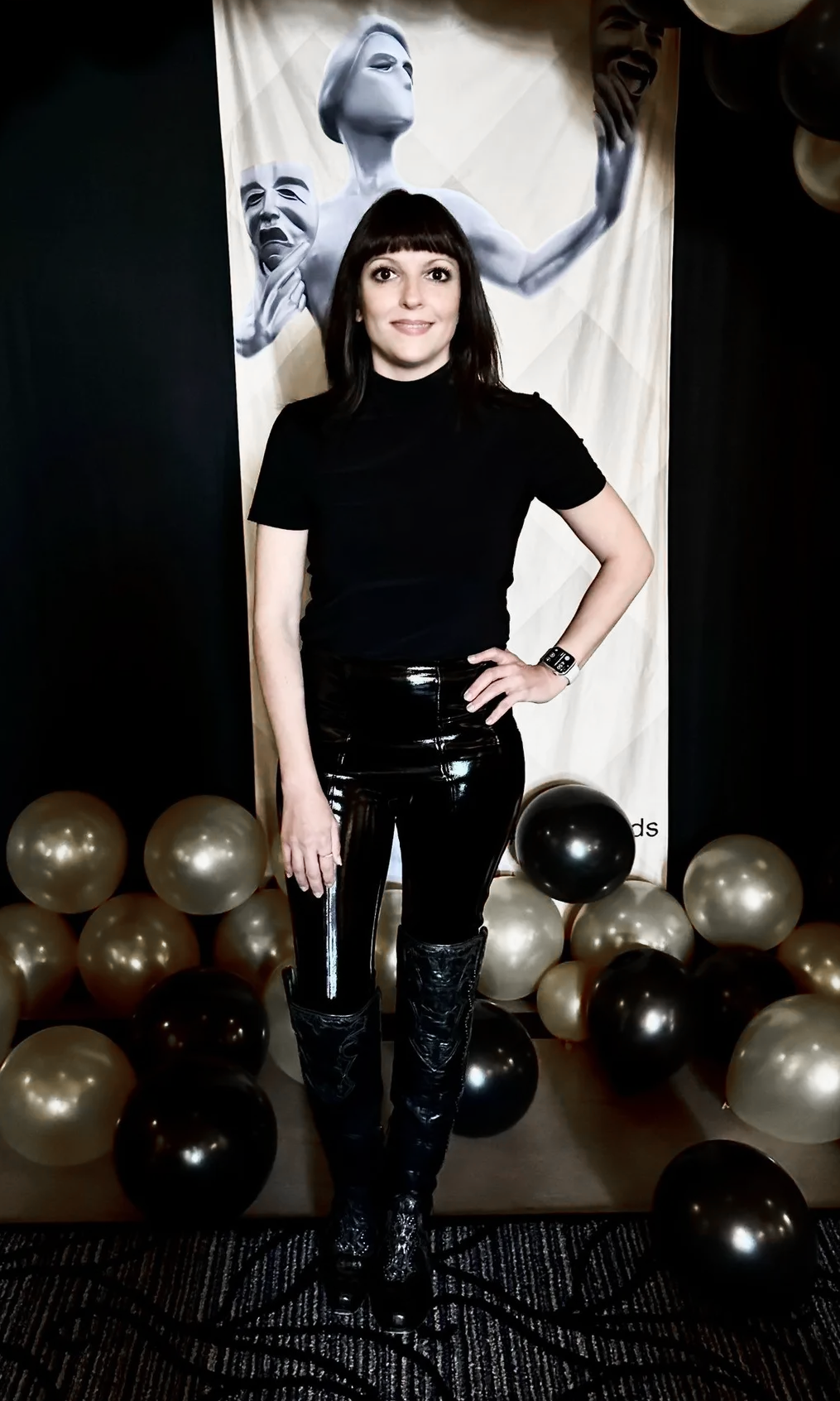
- Love at a SAG-AFTRA event
- Occupations: Actress, voice actress, producer
- Years active: 2004–present

Lexi Love is the performing name of Selena Scola, an actress and producer in entertainment and film, starting with pornographic films from 2004 to 2010. Scola has also engaged in workplace advocacy for entertainment workers and content moderators.

== Career ==
Scola graduated summa cum laude from the University of Pennsylvania and completed artificial-intelligence coursework through the MIT Sloan School of Management. Scola began performing under the name Lexi Love in pornographic films in 2004, appearing in more than 600 films between 2004 and 2010. XBIZ included her in its list of "100 Top Stars of 2007". In 2008, she appeared as herself (credited as Lexi Love) in the documentary 9to5 – Days in Porn. During that period, she also worked as a featured dancer, appeared at industry events and conventions, and participated in radio programs. In 2009, she became an advocate for improved safe sex precautions in the pornographic entertainment industry. She stopped performing on-camera in pornographic films around 2010.

In 2010, Scola appeared (credited as Lexi Love as "Hotel Room Hottie #1") in an episode of Adam Rifkin's television drama Look: The Series, which was depicted primarily as simulated security camera footage and was aired on Showtime. She was credited (as Lexi Love) in the 2013 video game Grand Theft Auto V for a voice role as a prostitute. In 2015, Scola became a member of SAG-AFTRA, registering under the performing name Lexi Love.

In 2016 she appeared as a prison guard in the crowdfunded black comedy horror film Director's Cut, which was also directed by Rifkin and was written by Penn Jillette (best known as a comedic magician). She had an uncredited role as a kickball player in the 2019 romantic comedy film Jexi.

Scola also founded Vegan Kitchen TV (VKTV) in 2010, a vegan food media project. Its programming included live cooking demonstrations featuring Scola, who also hosted live restaurant reviews. VKTV operated sporadically until around 2020.

Scola later appeared as herself (as Lexi Love) in the 2019 documentary film Patron of the Tarts: The Story of Mark Spiegler.

== Litigation ==
In March 2009, Scola filed a complaint with the WIPO Arbitration and Mediation Center of the World Intellectual Property Organization, after a company named Compana LLC registered the domain name "lexilove.com", alleging that the domain name had been registered in bad faith, trying to usurp her trademark rights to the name "Lexi Love". The arbitrator ruled in her favor in May 2009, requiring the domain name registration to be transferred to Scola.

On September 21, 2018, Scola filed a proposed class action lawsuit in California against Facebook, Inc. and staffing company Pro Unlimited, Inc. The complaint alleged inadequate workplace protections for content moderators exposed to graphic material, and sought medical monitoring, mental-health treatment, and workplace safeguards. In May 2020, Facebook agreed to a $52 million settlement covering 14,000 current and former moderators in California, Arizona, Texas, and Florida. The agreement provided baseline payments, additional compensation for qualifying diagnoses, counseling access, and changes to workplace practices and content-review tools.

In 2025, Scola accused Clair Barnes, a drag performer using the same professional name, of trademark infringement. Barnes filed a federal action concerning the parties' competing claims to the name on December 19, 2025. In March 2026, Scola filed counterclaims against Barnes and trademark claims against Paramount Skydance Corporation and World of Wonder Productions, Inc. Following notification, several of Barnes social media accounts on platforms such as Cameo, X, Facebook, and Spotify were taken down by the hosting companies in response to the allegation of trademark violation. In July 2026, the court denied Paramount and World of Wonder's motion to dismiss Scola's claims.

== Award nominations ==
Year	Category	Work	Result
2007	Best Oral Sex Scene – Video	Naked and Famou$, with Kimberly Kane, Lexi Love, and the Glory Hole Boys	Nominated
2007	Most Outrageous Sex Scene	The Great American Squirt Off, with Cytherea, Flower Tucci, Angela Stone, Kat, Felony, Lexi Love, and Mark Davis	Nominated
2010	Best All-Girl Group Sex Scene	Squirt Gangbang 4, with Dana DeArmond, Jada Fire, Flower Tucci, Sindee Jennings, Lexi Love, and Britney Stevens	Nominated
2010	Most Outrageous Sex Scene	"It's Raining Squirt" from Squirt Gangbang 4, with Dana DeArmond, Jada Fire, Flower Tucci, Sindee Jennings, Lexi Love, and Britney Stevens	Nominated
2010	Best Oral Sex Scene	Flight Attendants, with Misty Stone and Lexi Love	Nominated
2012	Best All-Girl Group Sex Scene	Chick Flixxx, with Teagan Presley, Lexi Love, Asa Akira, Juelz Ventura, and Annabelle Lee	Nominated
