= Lucky Starzzz =

Cuban-American drag performer

- Born: Alain Castaneda; February 7, 1998 (age 28); Havana, Cuba
- Occupation: Drag performer
- Years active: 2021-present
- Television: RuPaul's Drag Race (season 17)

Lucky Starzzz is the stage name of Alain Castaneda (born February 7, 1998), a Cuban-American drag performer who competed on the seventeenth season of RuPaul's Drag Race and the eleventh season of RuPaul's Drag Race All Stars.

== Early life ==
Lucky Starzzz was born in Havana, Cuba. He moved from Havana to Miami at the age of 3.

== Career ==
Lucky Starzzz began doing drag makeup in 2017, and performed for the first time in 2021. Her first performance was at Azucar Nightclub in Miami, in which he danced to RuPaul's "Kitty Girl" and Teyana Taylor's "WTP". She is a drag performer who competed on the seventeenth season of RuPaul's Drag Race. On the third episode ("Monopulence!"), she was the first contestant to be eliminated from the competition, after placing in the bottom two of a Monopoly-inspired design challenge and losing a lip-sync contest against Joella. Her Instagram following grew by 294 percent while the show aired.

Lucky Starzzz has performed at Nathan's Beach Club. She also appeared at the Pridelines "Queerferno" gala. She cites her drag mentor to be fellow Drag Race alum Nina Bo'nina Brown.

In April 2026, Lucky was announced to be competing in the eleventh season of RuPaul's Drag Race All Stars in the first bracket.

== Personal life ==
Lucky Starzzz is based in Miami, Florida. She is friends with fellow Miami-based drag performers and RuPaul's Drag Race alumni Malaysia Babydoll Foxx, Mhi'ya Iman Le'Paige, and Morphine Love Dion. Malaysia notably assisted Lucky Starzzz by covering oversized baggage fees to ensure her attendance on the set of Drag Race.

== Discography ==
=== Singles ===
- "Luckys Lemonade" (2025)

== Filmography ==
- RuPaul's Drag Race (season 17) (2025)
- RuPaul's Drag Race: Untucked (2025)
- RuPaul's Drag Race All Stars (season 11, 2026)
