= Katy Perry videography =

Videos and media by American singer

Katy Perry at the Tribeca Festival in June 2026

The American singer Katy Perry has released two video albums and has appeared in various music videos, films, television shows, and television commercials. After appearing in various music videos between 2005 and 2007, including "Goodbye for Now" and "Cupid's Chokehold", a video for "Ur So Gay" was released to introduce her to the music industry. In 2008, she released videos for "I Kissed a Girl" and "Hot n Cold", both taken from her second studio album One of the Boys. Videos for "Thinking of You" and "Waking Up in Vegas" were released the following year.

Perry's third studio album Teenage Dream (2010) spawned the single "California Gurls", whose music video is set in the fictional land of "Candyfornia" and features rapper Snoop Dogg. The Yoann Lemoine-directed video "Teenage Dream" depicts her as a euphoric teenager. Her "Firework" video is based on self-empowerment, and won the MTV Video Music Award for Video of the Year. The video for "E.T." takes place in outer space, and features rapper Kanye West. Perry also released "Last Friday Night (T.G.I.F.)"—a video based on a hangover after a house party—and "The One That Got Away"—which focuses on flashbacks of days with a deceased lover. In 2012, she reissued her third album as Teenage Dream: The Complete Confection, and also released videos for the singles "Part of Me" and "Wide Awake". The following year, Perry released her fourth studio album Prism, with "Roar" as its lead single, whose music video features her in a jungle after a plane crash. The video for her next single, "Unconditionally", is based on unconditional love. In the "Birthday" video, she impersonates five different characters to entertain at birthday parties. Perry's fifth studio album Witness in 2017 spawned music videos for the songs "Chained to the Rhythm", "Bon Appétit", "Swish Swish", and "Hey Hey Hey".

For Perry's sixth studio album Smile, animated videos were distributed for its tracks "Never Really Over", "Harleys in Hawaii", "Cry About It Later", "Tucked", "Resilient", and "What Makes a Woman" throughout 2020. Two years later, she returned to live action music videos for her collaborations with Alesso on "When I'm Gone" and with Thomas Rhett on "Where We Started". In 2024, her seventh studio album 143 spawned music videos for "Woman's World", "Lifetimes", and "I'm His, He's Mine".

In addition to her music videos, Perry has voiced Smurfette in The Smurfs (2011) and its sequel The Smurfs 2 (2013). Her autobiographical documentary Katy Perry: Part of Me (2012) follows her through the California Dreams Tour and the breakdown of her marriage to comedian Russell Brand. In the United States, the film is the eighth highest-grossing documentary of all time. She has appeared in television shows, including in guest judging roles in American Idol and The X Factor, as well as hosting Saturday Night Live in December 2011. Perry has additionally starred in episodes for the television shows How I Met Your Mother, Raising Hope, and The Simpsons, and won the People's Choice Award for Favorite TV Guest Star for her appearance in How I Met Your Mother. Perry also starred in a four-day long livestream event on YouTube in 2017 titled Katy Perry Live: Witness World Wide. She later appeared in the music video for Taylor Swift's "You Need to Calm Down" during 2019.

== Music videos ==
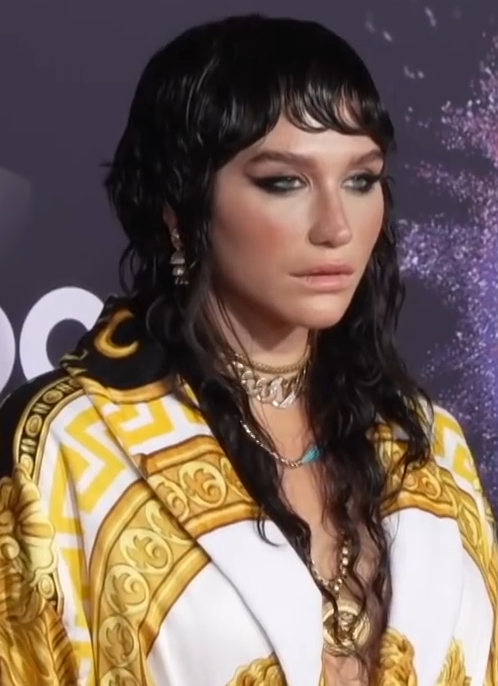
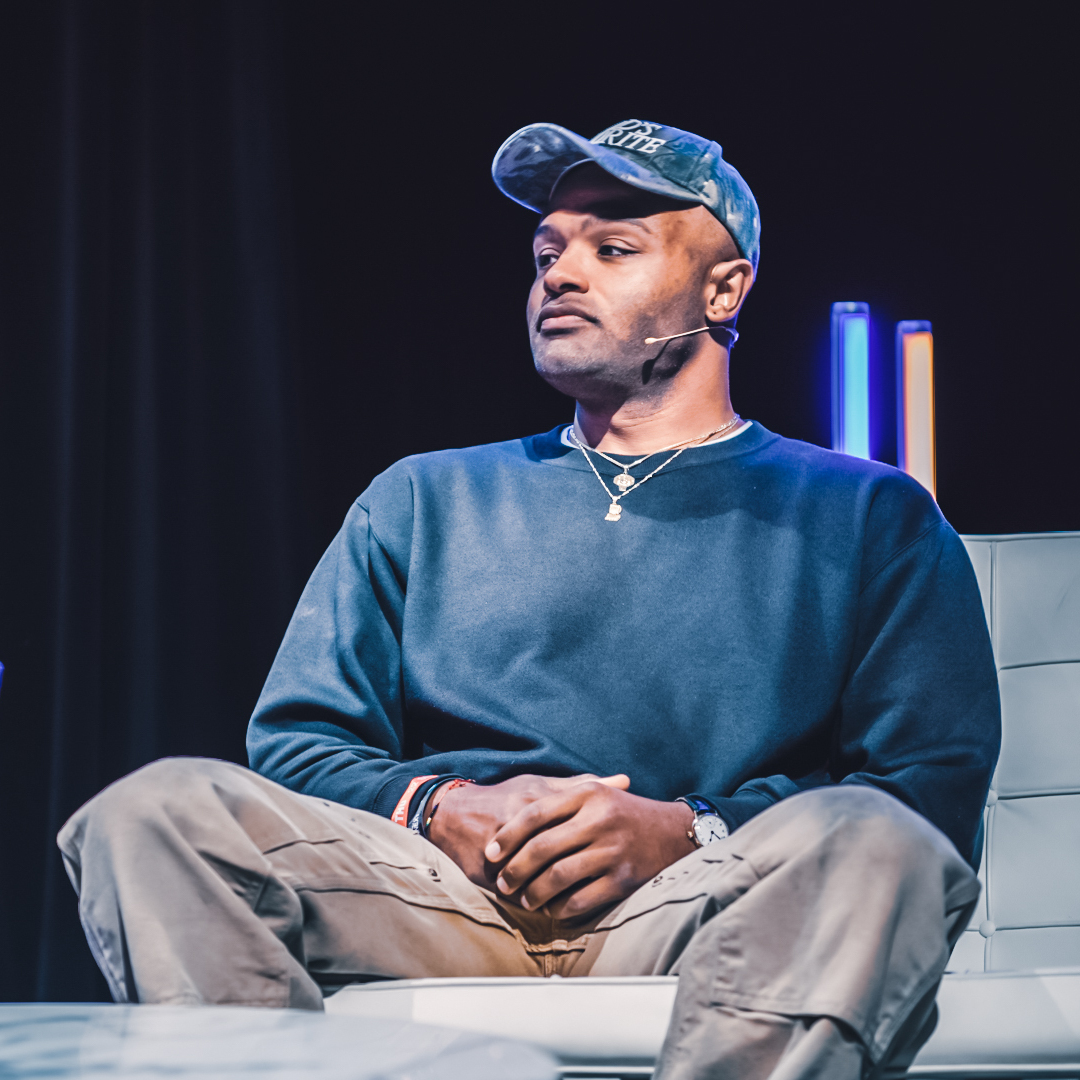
Kesha (top) and Trevor McFedries (bottom) appear in the video for Perry's "I Kissed a Girl".

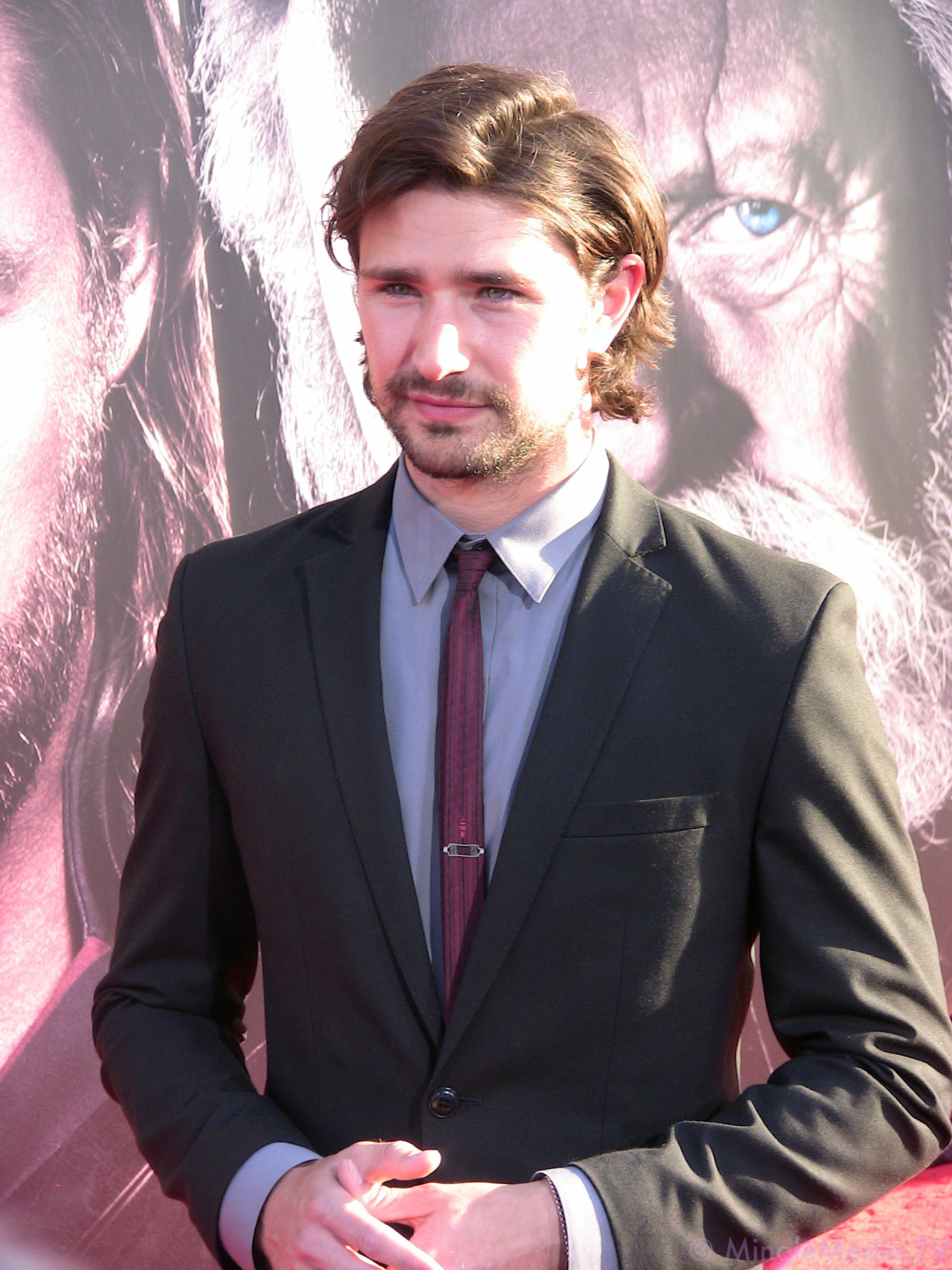
Matt Dallas appears as Perry's soldier love interest in "Thinking of You".

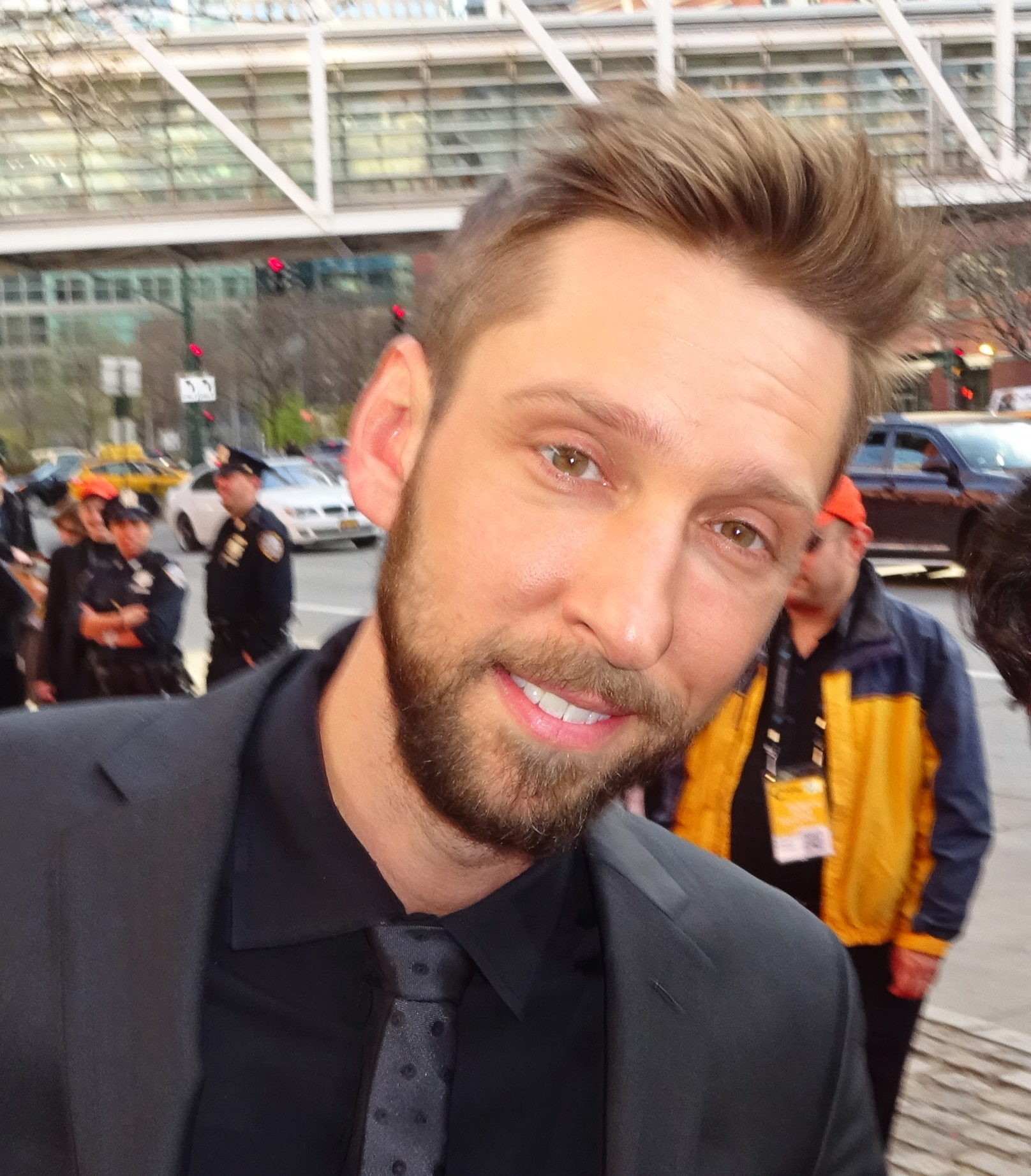
Joel David Moore appears as Perry's love interest in "Waking Up in Vegas".

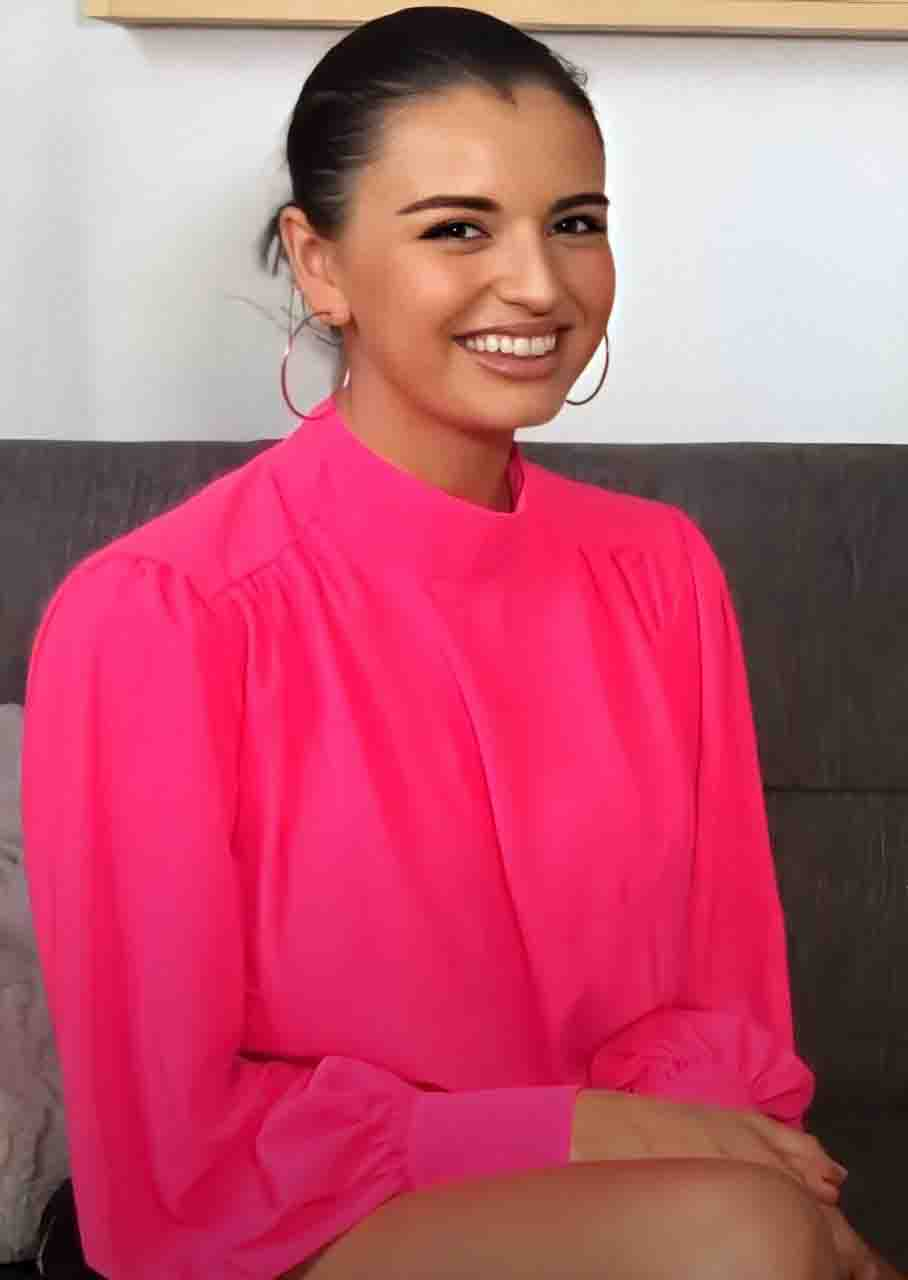
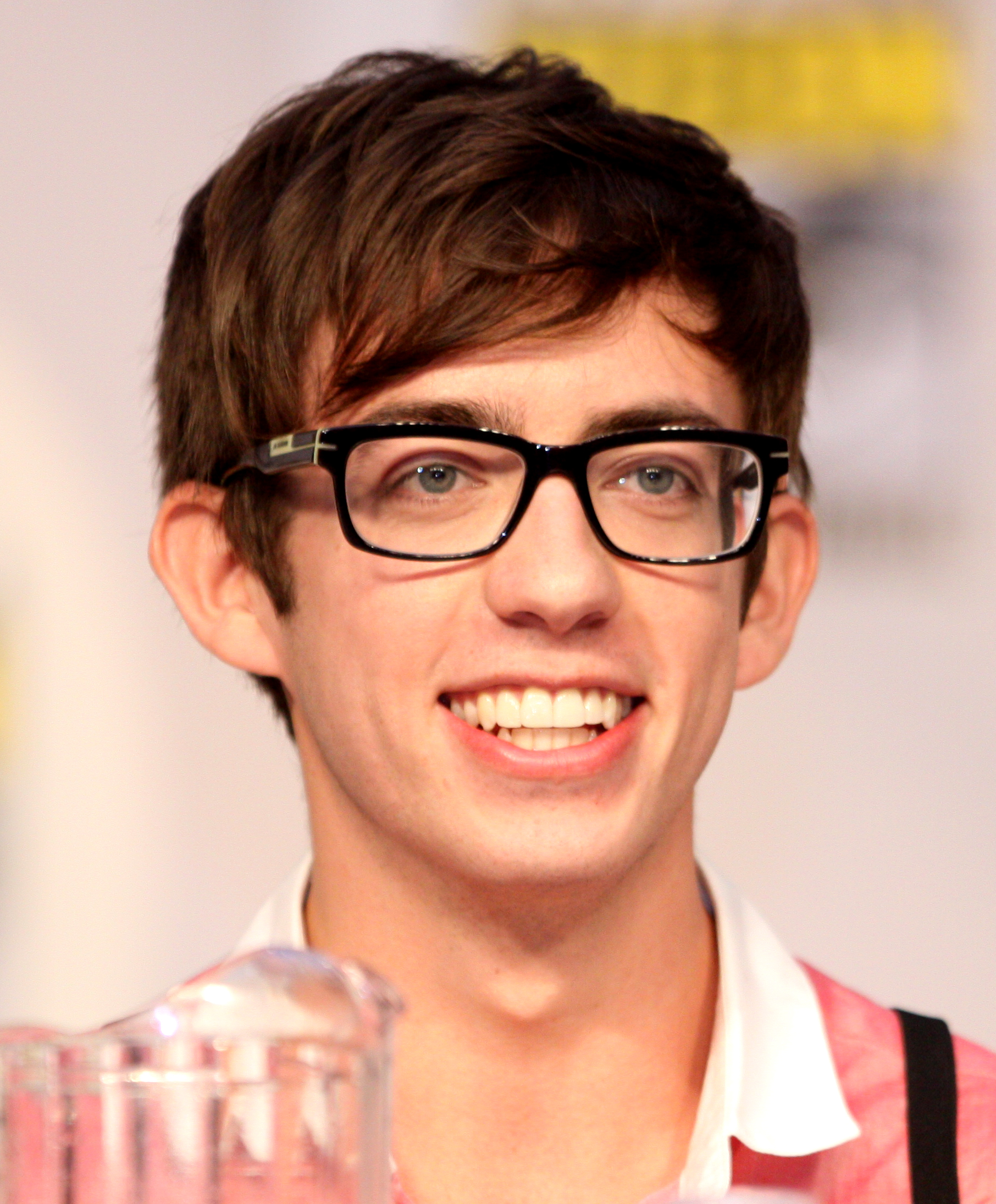
Rebecca Black (top) and Kevin McHale (bottom) appear in the video for Perry's "Last Friday Night (T.G.I.F.)".

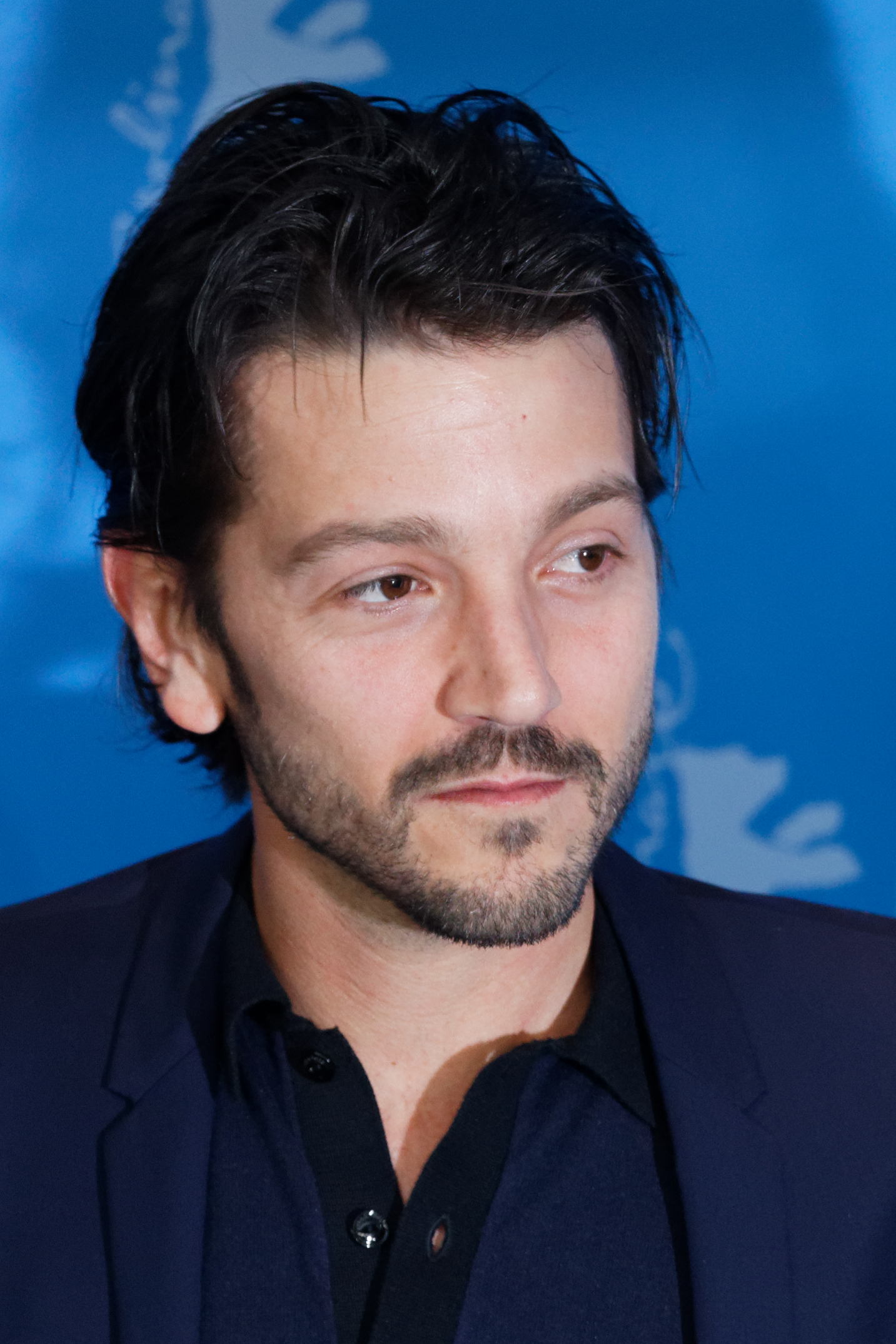
Diego Luna appears as Perry's love interest in "The One That Got Away".

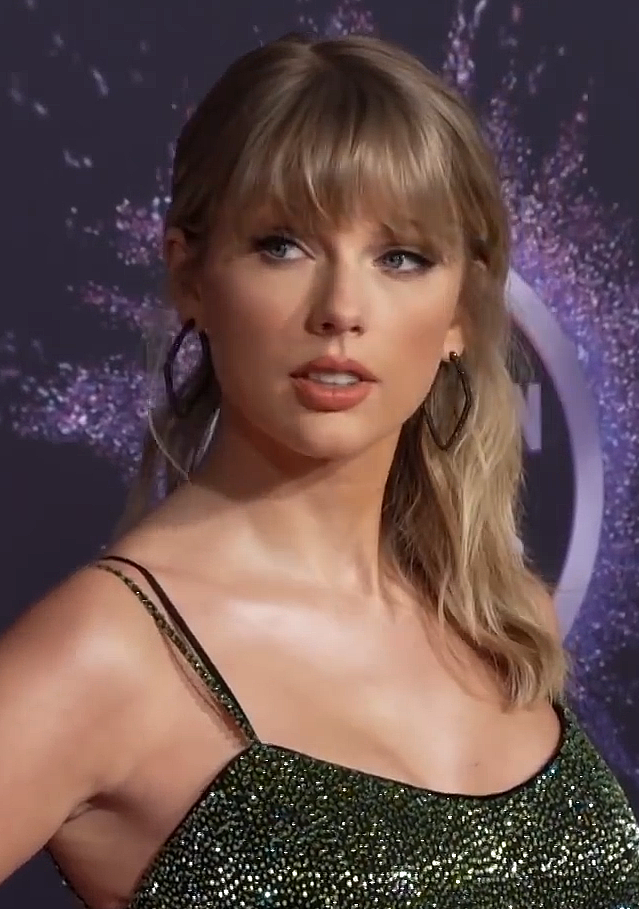
Perry appears in the video for Taylor Swift's "You Need to Calm Down".

Title	Year	Other performer(s) credited	Director(s)	Description	Ref.
"The Box"	2005	None	Glen Ballard	Promotional music video filmed for an unreleased album that Perry worked on with Ballard.	
"Simple"	2005	None	Glen Ballard	Promotional music video filmed for an unreleased album that Perry worked on with Ballard.	
"Long Shot"	2005	None	Glen Ballard	Promotional music video filmed for an unreleased album that Perry worked on with Ballard.	
"A Cup of Coffee"	2005	None	Glen Ballard	Promotional music video filmed for an unreleased album that Perry worked on with Ballard.	
"It's Okay to Believe"	2005	None	Glen Ballard	Promotional music video filmed for an unreleased album that Perry worked on with Ballard.	
"Diamonds"	2005	None	Glen Ballard	Promotional music video filmed for an unreleased album that Perry worked on with Ballard.	
"Thinking of You" (Original version)	2007	None	Walter May	Uses a cross-cutting technique to compare two relationships.	
"Ur So Gay"	2007	None	Walter May	A low-budget video in which two dolls play the roles of Perry and her boyfriend during the video.	
"I Kissed a Girl"	2008	None	Kinga Burza	Features Perry and various flamboyantly-dressed women dancing to the song. DJ Skeet Skeet and a then-unknown Kesha appear in the music video.	
"Hot n Cold"	2008	None	Alan Ferguson	Stars Perry as a bride about to marry her fiancé, Alexander, who flees the altar before saying his vows. Perry's parents Keith Hudson and Mary Perry appear in the video, as well as Shannon Woodward and Jadyn Maria who play bridesmaids.	
"Thinking of You" (Commercial version)	2008	None	Melina Matsoukas	Perry portrays a young woman whose lover was killed in France during World War II and reminisces of times with her deceased lover. Matt Dallas plays Perry's soldier boyfriend.	
"Waking Up in Vegas"	2009	None	Joseph Kahn	Follows Perry and her love interest while they are in Las Vegas, Nevada. Through gambling, they win a large amount of money, only to lose it all and argue. Joel David Moore stars as Perry's lover. Penn and Teller, Daniel Negreanu, Gavin, and George J. Maloof, Jr. make cameos in the video.	
"Starstrukk"	2009	3OH!3	Marc Klasfeld and Steve Jocz	3OH!3 sit at a fountain and retrieve coins that have been thrown in, causing women to begin pursuing them. In other scenes, Perry and 3OH!3 sing together in front of the fountain. During her verse, Perry dances underneath the fountain at night.	
"If We Ever Meet Again"	2010	Timbaland	Paul "Coy" Allen	Follows an art thief and a jewellery thief. Perry and Timbaland sing and dance together in a black room. Both thieves are arrested by police. At the end of the video, the thieves retrieve the stolen items.	
"California Gurls"	2010	Snoop Dogg	Mathew Cullen	Takes place in the fictional land of Candyfornia. Perry frees various women held in candy-related traps. She defeats Snoop Dogg's army of gummy bears using a whipped-cream bra.	
"Teenage Dream"	2010	None	Yoann Lemoine	Filmed in Perry's hometown of Santa Barbara, California and features her friends. She drives in a car with a boyfriend before going to the beach. At the end of the video, the couple swim in a pool and kiss underwater.	
"Firework"	2010	None	Dave Meyers	Filmed in Budapest. There are various shots of young people from around the city tackling their insecurities. At the end, Perry and the youth of the city dance in the courtyard of Buda Castle as fireworks burst from their chests. Perry dedicated the video to the It Gets Better Project.	
"E.T."	2011	Kanye West	Floria Sigismondi	West floats around in a spacecraft, while Perry portrays an alien who lands on an abandoned planet Earth. She approaches a robot which turns into a human male, with whom Perry walks into the distance with. Perry's love interest in the video is played by Shaun Ross.	
"Last Friday Night (T.G.I.F.)"	2011	None	Marc Klasfeld and Danny Lockwood	Perry portrays nerdy teenager Kathy Beth Terry. In a flashback, Kathy Beth Terry hears a party going on from Rebecca Black's house. Black pulls her inside and gives her a makeover. The entire gathering eventually moves to Terry's house. Stars Rebecca Black as herself, Darren Criss as Aaron Christopherson, Kevin McHale as Everett McDonald, Corey Feldman and Debbie Gibson as Kathy Beth Terry's parents, Kirk and Tiffany Terry, Kenny G as Uncle Kenny, and Hanson as themselves.	
"The One That Got Away"	2011	None	Floria Sigismondi	Begins with Perry as an elderly woman who reminisces of her former lover and the couple's argument, resulting in her boyfriend leaving. Her old boyfriend is seen driving away, before accidentally driving off a cliff. Perry's older self approaches the cliff and holds hands with a vision of him, before he disappears and she sadly walks away. Stars Diego Luna as Perry's deceased former lover.	
"Part of Me"	2012	None	Ben Mor	Perry witnesses her boyfriend cheating on her with a co-worker. She sees a sign encouraging women to become Marines. She enlists in the Marine Corps, and goes through vigorous training.	
"Wide Awake"	2012	None	Tony T. Datis	Starts with Perry going to her dressing room, which changes into a labyrinth with various obstacles. She eventually reaches the exit and escapes. The setting changes back to Perry's dressing room, before she rises on stage to perform.	
"Roar"	2013	None	Grady Hall and Mark Kudsi	Perry plays a woman whose plane crashes into a deserted island. Her boyfriend is attacked by a tiger which Perry tames at the end of the video.	
"Unconditionally"	2013	None	Brent Bonacorso	Features scenes of Perry singing in the snow, as well as being hit by a car and on fire which are used to symbolize the feeling of unconditional love.	
"Who You Love"	2013	John Mayer	Sophie Muller	Features scenes of various couples riding a mechanical bull as Perry and Mayer sing together, before they ride it themselves with fireworks raining down behind them.	
"Dark Horse"	2014	Juicy J	Mathew Cullen	Set in Memphis, Egypt in Ancient Egypt. Stars Perry as Katy Pätra (inspired by Egyptian pharaoh Cleopatra) who is approached by multiple suitors attempting to win her heart, all of whom she turns into dust or otherwise eradicates. Perry dances on a stripper pole during Juicy J's verse.	
"Birthday"	2014	None	Mark Klasfeld and Danny Lockwood	Perry portrays five characters (an elderly woman named Goldie, a Jewish Master of ceremonies (MC) named Yosef Shulem, a clown named Kriss, an animal trainer named Ace, and a face-painter named Princess Mandee) at several birthday parties, whose guests are oblivious to her real identity. Stunts are then staged (such as a car crash outside a party and Perry dropping a cake on a man) to elicit reactions and Perry takes off her disguise at a young girl's party.	
"This Is How We Do"	2014	None	Joel Kefali	Features minimalistic scenes of Perry enacting many of the activities described in the song, integrated with scenes of Perry and dancers relaxing by the pool and wearing outfits inspired by Piet Mondrian.	
"Rise"	2016	None	Paul Gore	Perry is shown struggling to get a parachute to fly as she travels through canyons and water.	
"Chained to the Rhythm"	2017	Skip Marley	Mathew Cullen	Filmed at Six Flags Magic Mountain in California, Perry and the other attendees dance their way through the seemingly perfect amusement park, oblivious to the world around them. The video alludes to political climate within the United States.	
"Bon Appétit"	2017	Migos	Dent De Cuir	Perry is prepared and served by chefs including Roy Choi as a meal while singing her lyrics and Migos watches while rapping their verses. At the end of the video, Perry kidnaps the dinner guests instead.	
"Feels"	2017	Calvin Harris, Pharrell Williams, and Big Sean	Emil Nava	Perry is shown on an island with Harris, Williams, and Sean and sings her lyrics while relaxing in a meadow.	
"Swish Swish"	2017	Nicki Minaj	Dave Meyers	Perry plays on a basketball team called "The Tigers" competing against the opposing team called "The Sheep", while Minaj performs during the game's halftime show.	
"Feels" (Second video)	2017	Calvin Harris, Pharrell Williams, and Big Sean	Emil Nava	Perry, Harris, Williams, and Sean are featured as a band playing the song in front of a live audience.	
"Hey Hey Hey"	2017	None	Isaac Rentz	Perry plays a woman resembling Marie Antoinette who seeks to escape her obligations and chosen suitor, and daydreams of herself as Joan of Arc. Perry's character is executed at the end of the video, while her Joan of Arc persona returns to exact her revenge.	
"365"	2019	Zedd	Warren Fu	Zedd is featured as a human test subject used for an experiment where lives with Perry, who portrays a robot that falls in love with him.	
"Never Really Over"	2019	None	Philipp Price	Perry plays a woman who goes to a New Age retreat after the break up of a relationship and participates in activities such as dancing, acupuncture and tree-hugging. As she leaves, she sees her former partner entering the same retreat.	
"Small Talk"	2019	None	Tanu Muino	Perry and her pet dog Nugget attend a dog show where they win the top prize. She sees another competitor and immediately falls for him. Perry's attention is shifted to the man and she ignores her dog. Eventually he moves in with Perry and brings his dog. Perry, the man and their two dogs are seen all together at the end.	
"Harleys in Hawaii"	2019	None	Pau Lopez, Gerardo del Hierro and Tomas Pena	Perry is seen riding a motorbike, singing in a bar and dancing on the beach as she pursues a man who also rides a motorbike. The two are seen kissing and they ride off together on his motorbike.	
"Never Worn White"	2020	None	J.A.C.K.	Perry sings about her relationship with her fiancé Orlando Bloom in a white dress and later a rose dress and also reveals she is pregnant in the video.	
"Daisies"	2020	None	Liza Voloshin	A heavily pregnant Perry walks among daisies wearing a white dress as she sings. She is also seen standing on rocks and by a stream where she removes her dress and briefly poses naked.	
"Daisies (Can't Cancel Pride)"	2020	None	Ashley Evans and Antony Ginandjar	Perry performs a remix of "Daisies", which features elements from "I Kissed a Girl", "Peacock", "Walking on Air", and "Swish Swish". She is dressed in and interacts with various pride themed clothing and accessories.	
"Smile" (Performance Video)	2020	None	Ashley Evans and Antony Ginandjar	A tiny Perry dressed in clown attire dances and sings while interacting with large objects, dancing clowns, and a larger version of herself.	
"Smile"	2020	None	Mathew Cullen	Perry plays a circus-themed video game called Smile. She selects the Sad Clown character and is transformed into the character as she plays. Eventually, Perry wins the game and then throws a custard pie into her own face to celebrate.	
"Never Really Over" (The Smile Video Series)	2020	None	Rafatoon	An animated video combining computer-generated imagery (CGI) and traditional animated elements. Seen from Point-of-view shot (POV), a woman repeats a daily routine of waking, brushing her teeth and washing her breakfast plate. One day she smashes the plate, then puts the broken pieces back together. She wakes and finds the plate repaired and her breakfast arranged in a smiling face.	
"Harleys In Hawaii" (The Smile Video Series)	2020	None	Hoku & Adam	An animated video in the style of early black and white cartoons. A hula dancer and a waiter slip away from their place of work on a Harley-Davidson motorcycle, pursued by their boss. They are joined by an animated version of Perry and all end up performing a dance routine together.	
"Cry About It Later" (The Smile Video Series)	2020	None	Sykosan	An animated video in the style of Anime. A young witch flies between parties in different fairytale settings on her broomstick. Eventually she meets a woman in a futuristic city and kisses her as they fly away together.	
"Tucked" (The Smile Video Series)	2020	None	Hoku & Adam	An animated video in the style of a comic book. A young woman named Dotty lives with her husband, who is a giant piece of broccoli, but is having an affair with a giant piece of candy. Her husband discovers them in bed together and fights the candy, only for them to end up in bed together as Dotty watches. Dotty then awakes and realises it was a dream.	
"Champagne Problems" (The Smile Video Series)	2020	None	Kate Hollowell	Perry, in a silver dress and sparkling head-dress, performs the song alone in a disco setting with video effects reminiscent of 1970s.	
"Resilient" (The Smile Video Series)	2020	None	Aya Tanimura	A stop motion animation video. Representations of Perry at different stages of her career appear in a street while a plant grows through a crack in the pavement, eventually becoming a flowering tree. The video includes references to her other songs and her pets.	
"What Makes a Woman" (The Smile Video Series)	2020	None	Mustashrik Mahbub	A series of animated vignettes of women in various situations such as working in a hospital, reading TV news and raising children. They are seen gathered together at the end.	
"Teary Eyes" (Behind the Smile)	2020	None	Quinn Wilson	A compilation of behind the scenes footage of the photoshoot for Perry's sixth studio album Smile.	
"Resilient (Tiësto Remix)"	2020	Tiësto and Aitana	Chloe Wallace	A promotional film for Coca-Cola's "Open To Better" campaign which features Perry and Aitana singing in a compilation of clips filmed in various styles.	
"Not the End of the World"	2020	None	Similar But Different	Blue-skinned aliens intending to capture Katy Perry capture Zooey Deschanel instead. Aboard their spaceship, the aliens show her a timer counting down to Earth's impending destruction. Initially protesting, Zooey agrees to pretend she is Perry in exchange for help in preventing the catastrophe. She unplugs a cable marked "Earth's Internet" and saves the Earth, then performs a concert as Perry.	
"Electric"	2021	None	Carlos López Estrada	The video starts with Perry and Pikachu hanging out in Hawaii. After the two stop at Diamond Head Lighthouse, they travel back in time. They encounter the younger versions of themselves, who are performing at the farmer's marketplace. The older version of Perry subtly manipulates the marketplace to help the younger version of herself find her style in music. Afterwards, she gets her younger version to join a talent competition being held at the island. By the end of the video, the younger version of Perry gives her first club performance as the older version of Perry and Pikachu looks on from the crowd.	
"When I'm Gone"	2022	Alesso	Hannah Lux Davis	Perry is seen singing and dancing with backup dancers in an industrial setting.	
"Where We Started"	2022	Thomas Rhett	Patrick Tracy	Perry and Rhett are seen singing in rooms filled with curtains and furniture covered in sheets. At the climax of the song, they both pass by mirrors that reflect their younger selves.	
"Woman's World"	2024	None	Charlotte Rutherford	Perry is shown singing the lyrics while dressed as a skimpy Rosie the Riveter using power tools and drinking whiskey before being crushed by a falling anvil. After awakening in a white knit bikini and bionic legs, she goes off to explore new scenery, stopping once to fuel herself by putting a gas pump into her buttocks. Perry then joins media celebrity Trisha Paytas in a monster truck, and they ride it until crushing a car. Perry exits the truck to walk through a nearby house, smashing through a glass door in the back. She sees a young woman using a female gender symbol-shaped light for a TikTok dance, and takes it for herself. After being repeatedly asked "Who are you?", she screams "I'm Katy Perry!" while flying away on a helicopter.	
"Lifetimes"	2024	None	Stillz	Perry is seen partying and having fun in Ibiza.	
"I'm His, He's Mine"	2024	Doechii	Torso	The video begins with Perry skydiving with her lover, before transitioning to the streets of Barcelona, where she dances on the hood of a moving chrome Corvette. Great part of the music video was filmed at the Autonomous University of Barcelona, in Cerdanyola del Vallès. Doechii is seen hanging from a flying drone, before landing on the shoulders of her lover.	
"bandaids"	2025	None	Christian Breslauer	Perry is seen getting injured in multiple ways, most of them reminiscent of scenes from the Final Destination franchise.	

=== Guest appearances ===
Title	Year	Performer(s)	Director(s)	Description	Ref.
"Goodbye for Now"	2006	P.O.D.	Meiert Avis	Perry sings background vocals during the final chorus and appears at the end of the music video.	
"Learn to Fly"	2006	Carbon Leaf		Perry stars as a girl who goes to see the band during a show.	
"Cupid's Chokehold"	2006	Gym Class Heroes (featuring Patrick Stump)	Alan Ferguson	Perry plays the love interest of Gym Class Heroes singer Travie McCoy.	
"Imagine" (UNICEF: World version)	2014	Various	Michael Jurkovac	Perry plays herself among guests who performed the John Lennon song.	
"Bitch I'm Madonna"	2015	Madonna (featuring Nicki Minaj)	Jonas Åkerlund	Perry is featured miming the lyric "Bitch I'm Madonna" in the video.	
"You Need to Calm Down"	2019	Taylor Swift	Taylor Swift and Drew Kirsch	Perry appears dressed in a hamburger costume towards the end of the video.	
"House With a View"	2022	Cyn	Kyle Newman	Perry leaves Cyn in the care of her mansion while she travels to Las Vegas for 24 hours.	

== Video albums ==
Title	Album details	Description
MTV Unplugged	Released: November 13, 2009; Label: Capitol; Formats: CD, DVD, digital download	Physical release contains a DVD of Perry performing acoustic renditions of tracks from One of the Boys plus a new song, "Brick by Brick", and Fountains of Wayne cover "Hackensack".
The Prismatic World Tour Live	Released: October 30, 2015; Label: Capitol; Formats: DVD, Blu-ray, digital download	Contains a DVD of Perry performing during her tour of the same name plus 30 minutes of exclusive extras.

== Filmography ==
=== Films ===
Title	Year	Role	Notes	Ref.
The Smurfs	2011	Smurfette	Voice role	
Katy Perry: Part of Me	2012	Herself	Documentary	
The Smurfs 2	2013	Smurfette	Voice role	
Brand: A Second Coming	2015	Herself	Documentary	
Katy Perry: The Prismatic World Tour	2015	Herself	Concert film	
Katy Perry: Making of the Pepsi Super Bowl Halftime Show	2015	Herself	Documentary	
Jeremy Scott: The People's Designer	2015	Herself	Documentary	
Zoolander 2	2016	Herself	Cameo appearance	

=== Television ===
Title	Year	Role(s)	Channel	Notes	Ref.
Wildfire	2008	Club singer	ABC Family	Episode: "Life's Too Short"	
The Young and the Restless	2008	Herself	CBS	Episode 8,914	
American Idol	2010	Guest Judge	Fox	Season 9, Episode 5	
The X Factor	2010	Guest Judge	ITV	Series 7, Episode 2	
Saturday Night Live	2010	Musical guest	NBC	Episode: "Amy Poehler/Katy Perry"	
Extreme Makeover: Home Edition	2010	Herself	ABC	Episode: "Boys Hope/Girls Hope"	
The Simpsons	2010	Herself	Fox	Episode: "The Fight Before Christmas", Live-Action scene	
How I Met Your Mother	2011	Honey	CBS	Episode: "Oh Honey"	
Saturday Night Live	2011	Host, various roles	NBC	Episode: "Katy Perry/Robyn"	
Raising Hope	2012	Rikki Hargrove	Fox	Episode: "Single White Female Role-Model"	
Saturday Night Live	2013	Musical guest	NBC	Episode: "Bruce Willis/Katy Perry"	
David Blaine: Real or Magic	2013	Herself	ABC	Television special	
Kroll Show	2014	Herself	Comedy Central	Episode: "Blisteritos Presents Dad Academy Graduation Congraduritos Red Carpet Viewing Party"	
CMT Crossroads	2014	Herself	CMT	Episode: "Katy Perry and Kacey Musgraves"	
Baring It All: Inside New York Fashion Week	2015	Herself	ABC Family	Television documentary film	
Saturday Night Live	2017	Musical guest	NBC	Episode: "Dwayne Johnson/Katy Perry"	
American Idol	2018–2024	Judge	ABC	Season 16–22	
Jeopardy! The Greatest of All Time	2020	Herself - Video Clue Presenter	ABC	1 episode	
The Rookie	2020	Herself	ABC	Season 2, Episode 16: "The Overnight"	
The Disney Family Singalong: Volume II	2020	Herself	ABC	Television special	
Masterchef Australia	2020	Guest judge	Network Ten	Season 12, Episode 24	
Lazada Turns 9 Super Party Philippines	2021	Guest performer	GMA	It's a television special by Lazada commemorating Lazada's 9th anniversary, temporarily replacing Bubble Gang. Also airing digitally through Lazada Philippines' official social media accounts.	
Saturday Night Live	2022	Musical guest	NBC	Episode: "Willem Dafoe/Katy Perry"	
Peppa Pig	2023	Mrs. Leopard	Nick Jr.	Episode: Get Ready for the Wedding	
Katy Perry: Night of a Lifetime	2024	Herself	ITV1	Television special	
RuPaul's Drag Race	2025	Guest judge	MTV	Season 17, Episode 1	

=== Commercials ===
Company or product	Year	Description	Ref.
ProSieben	2010	Perry performs "Teenage Dream" in the commercial, wearing a red dress similar to the one Marilyn Monroe wore in The Seven Year Itch.	
Proactiv	2010	Perry promotes Proactiv and speaks about her experience with acne problems and using the product.	
Adidas	2011	Perry appears in a series of commercials for Adidas as part of the company's "All Adidas" campaign.	
Adidas	2012	Perry's second advertisement for Adidas, also featuring David Beckham, Leo Messi, and Derrick Rose. Used as part of the "All In" campaign.	
Pepsi	2012	Shows clips from Katy Perry: Part of Me; used as part of Pepsi's "Live for Now" campaign.	
Capital FM	2012	Perry appears alongside other celebrities including Rihanna and Cheryl Cole in an advertisement for Capital FM.	
Popchips	2013	Appears in a digital commercial as part of the superhero team "Katy and the PopCats". With the help of the cats, Perry defeats the enemy potato chip manufacturer "Fat Cat" in the clip.	
Killer Queen by Katy Perry	2013	Perry appears in the commercial for her third fragrance, Killer Queen. In the commercial she stars as a queen who knocks away her assistants and kicks over a throne.	
2013 MTV Video Music Awards	2013	The commercial was used to promote Perry's performance of "Roar" at the 2013 MTV Video Music Awards.	
Walmart	2013	Used to promote Walmart and Perry's fourth album Prism. In the commercial, some of Perry's fans buy the record and are surprised to find her working at the checkout.	
CoverGirl	2014	"This Is How We Do" plays as Perry promotes the newest CoverGirl products. Also featured in other commercials as part of the company's 2014 campaign.	
Toyota Yaris	2015	The commercial was used to promote Toyota Yaris Thailand. Perry performed as four different character to drive Yaris. In addition, "This Is How We Do" was used in this commercial.	
H&M	2015	"Every Day Is a Holiday" plays as Perry sports various holiday-themed clothes from H&M. It was part of the clothing store's 2015 holiday campaign.	
Citi	2017	Perry appears in a commercial alongside her pet dog Nugget for Citi's Double Cash card "Means What It Says" campaign.	
Spotify	2021	Perry appears in a commercial for Spotify's "Music in Color" campaign in partnership with Behr. Three songs were used in the commercial, with each having a matching color; "Never Really Over" for yellow, "Waking Up in Vegas" for red, and "Teenage Dream" for blue.	

=== Web ===
Title	Year	Role	Notes	Ref.
Katy Perry Live: Witness World Wide	2017	Herself	Four-day livestream event on YouTube featuring guests, interviews, and a concert	
Will You Be My Witness?	2017	Herself	Behind-the-scenes YouTube Red special for "Katy Perry Live: Witness World Wide"	
Dear Class of 2020	2020	Herself		
