= Lexi Love (drag performer) =

American drag performer (born 1990)

- Born: November 22, 1990 (age 35)
- Other names: Clair Barnes; Lexi V. Love
- Occupation: Drag queen
- Years active: 2009–present
- Television: RuPaul's Drag Race

Clair Barnes (born November 22, 1990), known professionally as Lexi Love, is an American drag performer and model based in Louisville, Kentucky. She rose to prominence by competing on the seventeenth season of the reality competition television series RuPaul's Drag Race, in which she finished in third place.

Since August 2025, she has been embroiled in a trademark dispute over her use of the stage name "Lexi Love", which she had been using since 2009, while an actress had previously registered a trademark for the name and had been using it for various performances since 2004.

== Career ==
Lexi Love was appointed as the official American ambassador to the United Kingdom-based House of Versace by Drag Race UK winner Krystal Versace. One of her mentors is 2016 Mr. Continental winner Mykul Jay Valentine. An early drag mother of Lexi Love's was Nomi Love, and her current drag mother is Jessica Dimon.

Lexi Love was announced to be competing in the seventeenth season of competition series RuPaul's Drag Race on December 4, 2024. She was the first contestant to represent Louisville, Kentucky, and the oldest competitor in the season. Many of her competitors referred to her as "grandma" or "auntie" which sparked a debate online with fans involving ageism in the franchise. She then debuted in its second episode of the series, performing "She's Giving" while roller skating and doing cartwheels, which impressed her castmates and ultimately won. Her song was produced and co-written by record producer Drew Louis, and was released on January 10, 2025. For the Snatch Game challenge, Lexi Love impersonated the late comedian Gilbert Gottfried; digital magazine Entertainment Weekly saw her effort and "tried her hand at pulling off the feat" as she became the third contestant in the series playing a male-presenting character.

She remained safe constantly throughout the season, until she won a narrative interpretive dance challenge alongside Onya Nurve. Lexi Love soon made it to the season finale and performed her second song titled "Classic", but was overall eliminated along with Sam Star, finishing in third place. As the show aired, her following on the social media platform Instagram grew by 1,144 percent.

== Personal life ==
Barnes is a transgender woman and uses she/her pronouns. She is based in Louisville, Kentucky. Barnes was raised in Florence, Kentucky, and previously performed in the Cincinnati metropolitan area for nearly a decade, and afterwards Barnes worked for the Play Dance Bar in Louisville in 2021. She survived a period of homelessness and drug addiction, mostly thanks to her drag family.

During her appearance for the seventeenth season of RuPaul's Drag Race, Barnes disclosed in an interview about taking on a second mortgage for her garments.

After various HIV resources from government websites attributing for the LGBTQ community were removed on January 22, 2025, Barnes called out the second Donald Trump administration through Instagram. She shared an infographic from the NOH8 campaign, revealing herself to be HIV positive, and that she utilized a government funded HIV program for over ten years.

Barnes announced her indefinite break from performing on April 27, 2025, through social media, saying it was in order "to nurture my mental, physical, and emotional well-being". It was revealed she would be admitting herself to a rehabilitation clinic. Her manager subsequently clarified on May 10 that although Barnes had suffered with methamphetamine addiction in the past, "meth is not a factor here" and is simply for emotional therapy as well as "complete sobriety" from all other forms of drugs and alcohol. Barnes ended her time at the facility she attended on May 19, stating it was "short-lived due to some unforeseen circumstances".

In April 2025, Barnes announced that she would be using the name "Clair", saying "Beyond Lexi. I'm stepping into the light as Clair – the woman I've always been, and am finally allowing myself to fully embrace."

On June 18, 2025, Barnes got engaged to her partner Jay Groff, a trans man and vet tech.

== Artistry ==
Barnes cites her inspirations for her drag persona to be "nostalgic" from the annual Victoria's Secret runways and "very hardcore" in Y2K fashion. She uses roller skates while performing and describes herself as Kentucky's "Roller-Derby Doll".

== Legal dispute over stage name ==
In August 2025 (four months after Barnes announced her adoption of the name "Clair"), Selena Scola, an actress and content producer who had performed under the name "Lexi Love" since 2004 and had registered with SAG-AFTRA in 2015 with that name, announced that she had sent cease-and-desist letters to Barnes, RuPaul's Drag Race, Paramount, MTV, and World of Wonder, seeking to enforce her claim of a trademark on the name. Following notifications about the dispute, Barnes's accounts on Cameo, Facebook, and X (formerly Twitter) were suspended, and her debut single, "She's Giving", was removed from Spotify and Apple Music. Barnes had begun using the stage name Lexi Love in 2009.

In statements released to Deadline and Out Magazine, Barnes said that Scola had also sent cease-and-desist notices to several venues where Barnes had been booked to perform, resulting in three gig cancellations at the time of reporting. An investigation by Deadline found that although Scola had previously registered a trademark for the name "Lexi Love" and had obtained the domain name lexilove.com in 2009, she had allowed her trademark to lapse in March 2015, and had subsequently submitted another application for a trademark on the name in February 2024, covering "performing artists being both human clients and digital talent in the nature of digital personas, virtual performers and AI-driven talent", which was granted in January 2025, about one month after the cast reveal of the seventeenth season of Drag Race. Barnes said that Scola began attacking her personally after it was revealed she was cast on Drag Race and Scola's social media accounts were mistakenly tagged instead of her own. Scola also said that aspects of Barnes' personal history that were discussed on Drag Race had caused public confusion about whether they applied to her own personal life, such as Barnes' HIV status, former homelessness, and relationship with illegal drugs. An op-ed article in one LGBTQ publication alleged that Scola's remarks were transphobic and disrespectful to marginalized groups.

Barnes said that her legal team attempted to contact Scola trying to negotiate a licensing agreement to continue using the name, but without receiving any response from Scolas, while Scolas continued to comment online and report Barnes' social accounts for trademark infringement. As of August 2025, Barnes's official Instagram and TikTok accounts remained her only active social media profiles, which she said she was operating under her deadname, saying she felt she needed to do this to avoid suspension, although her Instagram account name continued to be "MsLexiLove" and she also said "I will still be using Lexi as my performance name for the time being as my team and I [continue] to navigate this situation." Barnes said she was considering holding a naming contest to help her choose a new stage name.

In December 2025, Barnes filed a counter-notice cease-and-desist letter against Scola. In July 2026, the court denied Paramount and World of Wonder's motion to dismiss Scola's claims.

== Discography ==
=== Singles ===
List of singles as lead artist, showing year released, and album name
| Title | Year | Album | Writer(s) | Producers(s) | Ref. |
|---|---|---|---|---|---|
| "She's Giving" (or Club Love remix) | 2025 | Non-album singles | Drew Louis, Lexi Love, and Timothy Liedel | Drew Louis | |
| "Classic" | 2025 | Non-album singles | Clair Barnes and Brett McLaughlin | Leland and Gabe Lopez | |

=== Guest appearances ===
List of non-single guest appearances, with other performing artists, showing year released and album name
| Title | Year | Album | Writer(s) | Producers(s) | Ref. |
|---|---|---|---|---|---|
| "This Is Your Moment" | 2025 | Bitch, I'm a Drag Queen!, Vol. 2 | Mark Byers | Markaholic | |
| "Before Dorothy" | 2025 | The Wicked Wiz of Oz: The Rusical! | Thomas C. Campbell, Brett McLaughlin, John Polly, and Michael Seligman | Leland and Gabe Lopez | |
| "Oz! (Finale)" | 2025 | The Wicked Wiz of Oz: The Rusical! | Thomas C. Campbell, Brett McLaughlin, John Polly, and Michael Seligman | Leland and Gabe Lopez | |

== Television appearances ==
List of television credits, with selected details
| Year | Title | Genre | Role | Notes | Ref. |
|---|---|---|---|---|---|
| 2024 | WHAS-TV | Interview | Herself | No notes | |
| 2025 | RuPaul's Drag Race | Competition | Herself | Season 17 (3rd place) | |
| 2025 | RuPaul's Drag Race: Untucked | Competition | Herself | Season 17 (3rd place) | |
| 2025 | 2025 MTV Video Music Awards | Variety | Herself | Performer with Sabrina Carpenter, Willam, Laganja Estranja, Symone, and Denali | |
