= Hormona Lisa =

American drag performer (born 1994)

- Born: March 15, 1994 (age 32)
- Other name: Jodie Jean Noel Corbin
- Occupation: Drag queen
- Years active: 2019–present
- Website: hormonalisa.com

Jodie Jean Noel Corbin, known professionally as Hormona Lisa, is an American drag performer and television personality. She competed on the seventeenth season of RuPaul's Drag Race (2025), where she finished in twelfth place.

== Early life ==
Jodie Jean Noel Corbin, known professionally as Hormona Lisa, was born on March 15, 1994, and was raised in North Georgia. She dropped out of art school.

== Career ==
I think that drag is something that everybody can enjoy and find some kind of enjoyment in. So I would just like to see more people that may not typically go to a show, go to a show, just to kind of see what it’s all about.

— Hormona Lisa, telling Rising Rock she wants people to support local drag performers.

A theatre director first suggested Jodie do drag; she began performing under the drag persona Hormona Lisa in September 2019. Her drag name is a portmanteau of the words "hormone", because "[she's] a little wack-a-doodle", and "Mona Lisa", in reference to her artistic background. She has described her persona as "old school with a touch of camp", and cites Disney princesses, American beauty queen JonBenét Ramsey, and actresses Doris Day and Marilyn Monroe as inspirations. Hormona Lisa involves herself in theatre work and received awards at the Georgia Theatre Conference and the Southeastern Theatre Conference. Additionally, she has competed in various beauty pageants and was crowned as the Pride of Chattanooga 2020, Tennessee Fool 2021, and Tennessee Sweetheart 2021.

Hormona Lisa made her first television appearance as an audience member for reality series Bring Back My Girls (2023), while submitting a question to British drag performer Lady Camden.

Hormona Lisa attended American drag performer RuPaul's book tour for his memoir The House of Hidden Meanings (2024) on March 10. She walked onto the stage and explained she has applied to the reality competition series before and handed RuPaul her flash drive containing her audition tape. Nine months later, she was announced to compete on the upcoming seventeenth season of RuPaul's Drag Race (2025), becoming the first competitor from Chattanooga to appear. She placed in the bottom of the second episode after seven of her fellow contestants ranked her last based on her talent show performance (stand-up comedy), but was spared elimination after pulling a lever to dunk Michelle Visage. On the sixth episode of the season, she was eliminated after losing a lip sync to Lana Ja'Rae. Hormona Lisa's Instagram following grew by 548 percent while the show aired.

== Personal life ==
Jodie is a transgender woman and uses she/her pronouns. She is based in Chattanooga. Before becoming a professional drag performer, she worked as a paralegal for six consecutive years. She holds a degree in marketing and business administration, and another in interior architecture. She has named her musical inspirations to be Connie Francis, Doris Day, and Etta James.

Jodie has attention deficit hyperactivity disorder and was diagnosed with autism seven years prior to her RuPaul's Drag Race appearance. During the show's airing, she shared her autism diagnosis in a Reddit post.

== Discography ==
=== Singles ===
- "No More Rhinestones" (2025)

== Filmography ==
=== Television ===
List of television credits, with selected details
Title	Year	Role	Notes	Ref.
Bring Back My Girls	2023	Cameo		
RuPaul's Drag Race	2025	Contestant		

=== Web series ===
- Hello Hello Hello (2025), hosted by Kyran Thrax, World of Wonder
- Whatcha Packin' (2025), hosted by Michelle Visage, World of Wonder
