= Suzie Toot =

American drag performer

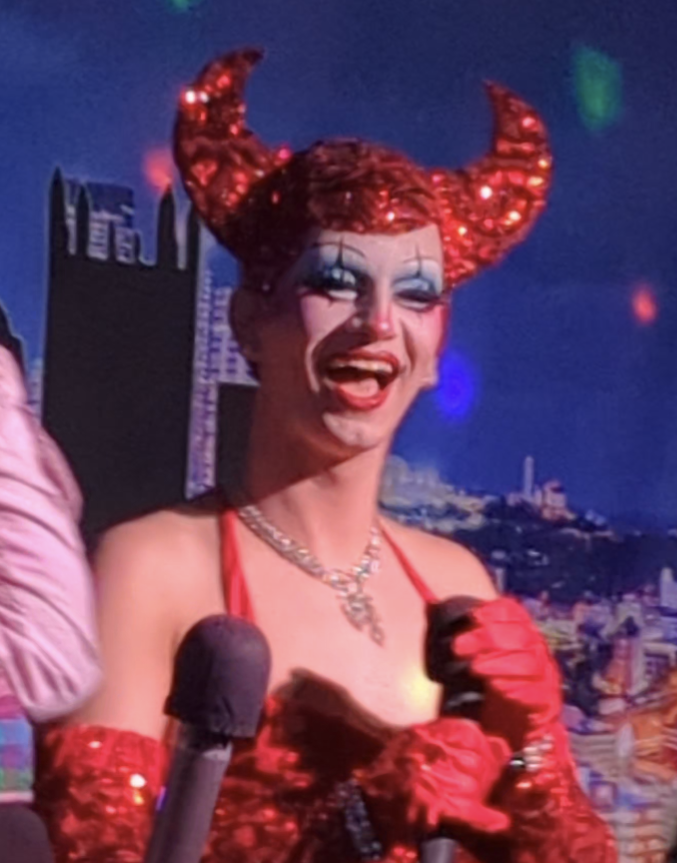
- Suzie Toot in Pittsburgh, 2025
- Born: Benjamin Shaevitz; April 5, 2000 (age 26); Long Island, New York, U.S.
- Occupation: Drag performer
- Years active: 2019-present
- Television: RuPaul's Drag Race (season 17)

Benjamin Shaevitz (born April 5, 2000), known professionally as Suzie Toot, is an American drag performer who participated in the seventeenth season of RuPaul's Drag Race.

== Early life and education ==
Shaevitz was born in Long Island, New York to an Irish Catholic mother named Susan (née Toot) and a Russian Jewish father, and was raised Jewish in Wellington, Florida, where her family moved when she was five. He attended a Hebrew school and Jewish sleepaway camp in the Pocono Mountains in his youth.

Alcoholism runs in his family and deeply affected his childhood. His first stage performance was at the age of 8, when he was cast as a part of the ensemble in a summer camp production of Fiddler on the Roof. Shaevitz was inspired to pursue drag after studying Ruby Keeler, Eleanor Powell, Varla Jean Merman, and Charles Busch. He wore dresses and cross-dressed as a teenager. He went to Palm Beach Central High School and played Pugsley Addams in The Addams Family. He began tap dancing in high school for a Mary Poppins musical. Shaevitz studied musical theater in college but dropped out.

== Career ==
Under the stage name Suzie Toot, Shaevitz portrayed Mimi Bouvèé-Truve in the 2023 queer horror film Big Easy Queens, and released a music single featuring Tow, "Bonecoming", that same year. Suzie Toot opened for Chappell Roan's Fort Lauderdale show as a part of The Midwest Princess Tour in October 2023.

Suzie Toot was the last eliminated contestant on the seventeenth season of RuPaul's Drag Race. On the fifteenth episode, ahead of the season finale, she competed in a lip-sync tournament for eliminated contestants. After lip-syncing to "Apt." (2024) by Rosé and Bruno Mars in the final round against Kori King, Suzie Toot was deemed the winner, earning her the title of 'The Queen of She Done Already Done Had Herses' and a cash prize of $50,000. Her Instagram following grew by 3,188 percent as the show aired.

In September 2025, Suzie Toot performed at Northern Nevada Pride.

== Personal life ==
Shaevitz is gay. Her drag name comes from her mom's name before marriage, Susan Toot.

Shaevitz was formerly based in Fort Lauderdale, Florida, and is now based in Brooklyn, New York. He describes his drag persona as the "cross section between Betty Boop and Lucille Ball".

== Discography ==
- "Bonecoming (feat. Tow)" (2023)
- "Smokin' Suzie" (2025)
- "Brother, Can You Spare a Dime?" (2025)

== Filmography ==
=== Film ===
- Big Easy Queens (2023)

=== Television ===
- RuPaul's Drag Race (season 17, 2025)
- RuPaul's Drag Race: Untucked (2025)

== Awards and nominations ==
Year	Award	Category	Nominee(s)	Result	Ref
2026	Queerty Awards	Future All-Star	Herself	Won	

== See also ==
- List of people from Fort Lauderdale, Florida
