= Drew Louis =

American record producer, singer, and songwriter

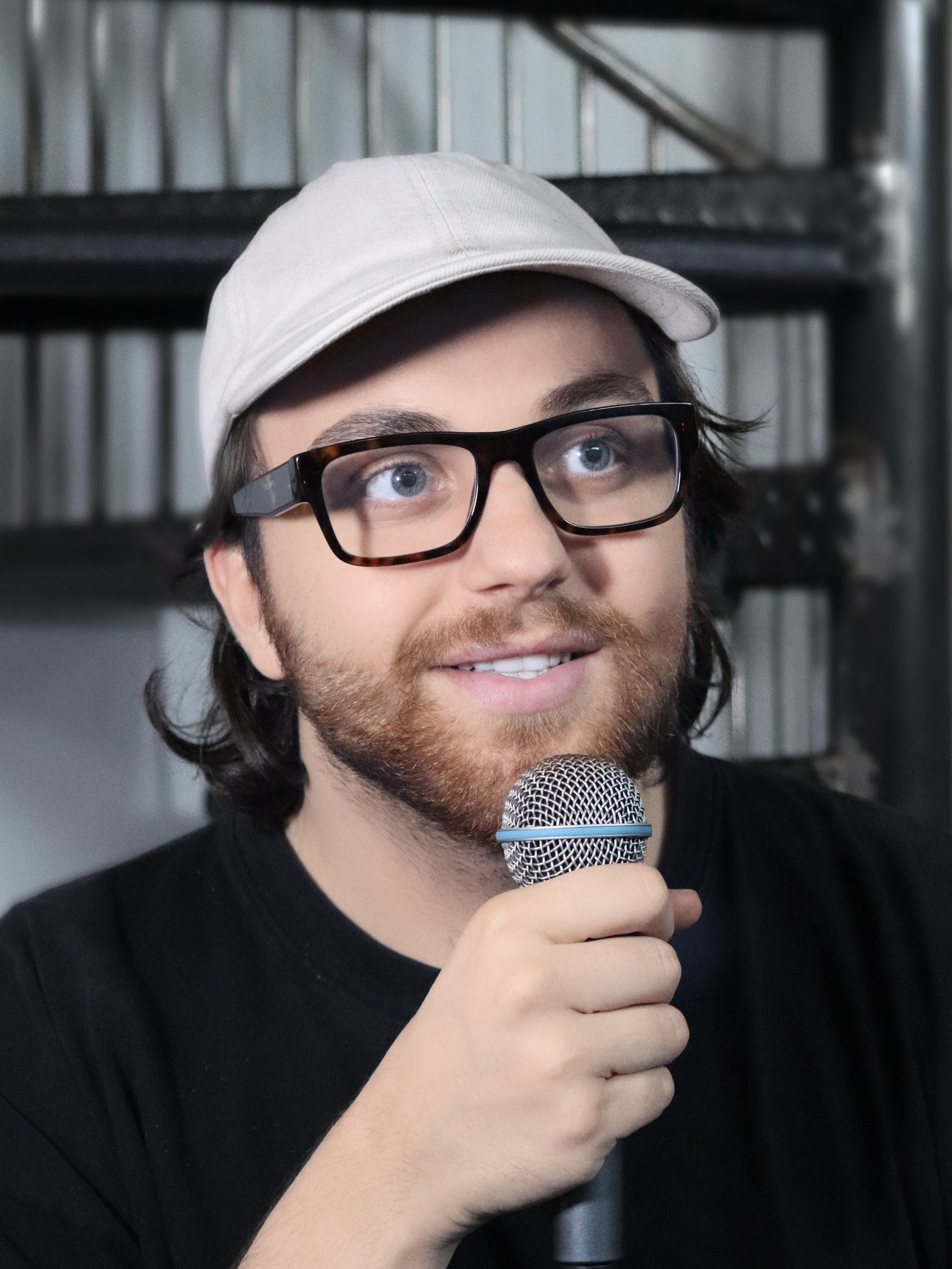
- Louis in 2024

Background information
- Born: Andrew Louis Klemm; March 28, 2000 (age 26); Akron, Ohio, U.S.
- Genre: Pop
- Occupations: Record producer; singer; songwriter
- Years active: 2020–present
- Spouse: Sam Klemm (m. 2026)
- Relatives: Jeff Klemm (brother)
- Website: drewlouis.com

Andrew Louis Klemm (born March 28, 2000; /dru ˈluɪs/ droo LOO-iss) is an American record producer, singer, and songwriter. He has written and produced songs for Jennifer Lopez, Trixie Mattel, Bonnie McKee, A Twink and a Redhead, Trisha Paytas, Grace Reiter, Yena, Vincint, Matt Rogers, and Trinity the Tuck, among others.

== Career ==
Louis's professional musical career began while studying at the Los Angeles College of Music, where he met K-pop and J-pop singer-songwriter Mayu Wakisaka. In 2021, Louis and Wakisaka co-wrote "Loving Out Loud" for The Gospellers. They then co-wrote "Vacay" & "Lxxk 2 U" for Yena's debut mini-album Smiley, as well as the title track of her third mini-album Good Morning in 2024. In October 2023, Louis was awarded the Music Forward LGBTQ+ Emerging Artist Award by Live Nation.

In May 2023, Drew produced the titular single for the Drag Isn't Dangerous digital fundraiser. In November 2023, Louis executive produced and co-wrote Trinity Ruins Christmas: The Musical with Trinity the Tuck. He then produced "My Kitty" for Amanda Tori Meating, which premiered on RuPaul's Drag Race Season 16 in January 2024.

In 2024, Louis discovered influencer duo Grant & Ash, and co-wrote and produced their debut viral single "A Twink and a Redhead". "A Twink and a Redhead" was nominated for the 2025 Queerties Anthem award. He went on to executive produce their self-titled debut EP A Twink and a Redhead.

In January 2025, he wrote and produced three songs for the debut episodes of RuPaul's Drag Race Season 17. In April 2025, Louis produced on the remix of RuPaul’s "Supermodel (You Better Work)" by Trixie Mattel & Vincint. They subsequently performed it at Coachella 2025. In April 2025, he started the process of co-writing and producing the music for Retrograde The Musical alongside Nick Laughlin, Richard C. Walter, and Jesse Saint John. In October 2025, Louis collaborated with Bonnie McKee on "Libra (Fairest of Them All)".

In January 2026, Drew co-produced a remix of "Play" by Jennifer Lopez with Trixie Mattel. In June 2026, he co-wrote and produced "Tate McRib" for Saturday Night Live cast member Grace Reiter.

== Discography ==
All credits are adapted from the American Society of Composers, Authors and Publishers's database, and Spotify.

=== Songwriting and production credits ===
| Year | Title | Artist(s) | Album | Writer(s) | Producer(s) |
|---|---|---|---|---|---|
| 2026 | “Hot Cross Buns” | Grant & Ash | Non-album single | Drew Louis, Grant Gibbs, Ashley Gill, Michelle Zarlenga | Drew Louis |
| 2026 | “Handnecklace” | Jayelle | Dirty Dancing | Drew Louis, Jayelle, Michelle Zarlenga | Drew Louis |
| 2026 | "Juicy Scoop" | Heather McDonald | Non-album single | Drew Louis, Heather McDonald, Jayelle Gerber | Drew Louis |
| 2026 | "Porcelain" | Jules Liesl | Metamorphosis | Jules Liesl, Keith Harris, Ellis Miah, Maggie Szabo | Drew Louis, Keith Harris |
| 2026 | "Metamorphosis" | Jules Liesl | Metamorphosis | Drew Louis, Jules Liesl, Michelle Zarlenga | Drew Louis |
| 2026 | “Raised by Wolves” | Jayelle & Bludnymph | Dirty Dancing | Drew Louis, Jayelle, Ash Gordon | Drew Louis |
| 2026 | “Want Me Like I Want U” | Jules Liesl | Metamorphosis | Drew Louis, Jules Liesl | Drew Louis, JoJo Centineo |
| 2026 | “What Is Indigo?” | Mr. Jeff | I’ve Got Heart | Drew Louis, Jeff Klemm | Drew Louis, Jeff Klemm |
| 2026 | "Feel the Aura" | Aura Mayari | Non-album single | Drew Louis, Jann Rick de Leon, Michelle Zarlenga | Drew Louis |
| 2026 | "Hot Hot Couture" | Jules Liesl | Metamorphosis | Drew Louis, Jules Liesl, Michelle Zarlenga | Drew Louis, JoJo Centineo |
| 2026 | "Polyamóre" | Bludnymph | Nympho | Drew Louis, Kya Hansen, Jayelle Gerber | Drew Louis |
| 2026 | “McRib” | Grace Reiter | Tate McRib | Drew Louis, Grace Reiter, Michelle Zarlenga | Drew Louis, Michelle Zarlenga |
| 2026 | “A Twink and a Redhead and a Mother” (featuring Trisha Paytas) | Grant & Ash | Non-album single | Drew Louis, Grant Gibbs, Ashley Gill | Drew Louis |
| 2026 | “Dance or Die” | Jules Liesl | Metamorphosis | Drew Louis, Jules Liesl, JoJo Centineo, Phoenix Stone, Sophie Zurawel, Violet Skies | Drew Louis, JoJo Centineo, Phoenix Stone |
| 2026 | “Keep Swimming” (featuring Snooknuk) | Mr. Jeff | I’ve Got Heart | Jeff Klemm, LaJuana Pigram Jacobs | Drew Louis, Jeff Klemm |
| 2026 | “Turn Me On” | Trixie Mattel & Jayelle | Dirty Dancing | Drew Louis, Jayelle, Michelle Zarlenga, Filipe Sousa | Drew Louis, Phluze, Trixie Mattel |
| 2026 | “Heaven Is a Gay Bar” | Zee Machine & Bonnie McKee | Non-album singles | Drew Louis, Joe Bissell, Bonnie McKee | Drew Louis, Zee Machine |
| 2026 | "Hung Up" | Trixie Mattel | Non-album singles | Stuart David Price, Bjoern K. Ulvaeus, Benny Göran Bror Andersson, Madonna Ciccone | Drew Louis, Zachary Brill |
| 2026 | "Sriracha" | Peng Peng | Non-album singles | Drew Louis, Christine Lee, Michelle Zarlenga | Drew Louis |
| 2026 | “Hit the Spot” | Jules Liesl | Metamorphosis | Drew Louis, Jules Liesl, JoJo Centineo, Reysha Rami, Phoenix Stone, Charlotte Brutten, Dex Barstad | Drew Louis, JoJo Centineo, Dex Barstad, Phoenix Stone |
| 2026 | "Hella Good" (featuring Bonnie McKee) | Trixie Mattel | Non-album single | Gwen Stefani, Pharrell Williams, Chad Hugo | Drew Louis, Trixie Mattel, Tony Kanal, FENIK |
| 2026 | “Every Song” | Jayelle | Dirty Dancing | Jayelle, Kya Hansen, Drew Louis | Drew Louis |
| 2026 | "Capricorn (Gravity)" (featuring Paolo Montalban) | Retrograde The Musical | Retrograde The Musical (Studio Cast Recording) | Drew Louis, Jesse Saint John, Nick Laughlin, Richard C. Walter | Drew Louis |
| 2026 | "Play (Trixie Mattel Remix)" | Jennifer Lopez, Trixie Mattel & Drew Louis | J.Lo (25th Anniversary Edition) | Christina Milian, Arnthor Birgisson, Anders Bagge, Cory Rooney | Drew Louis, Bag & Arnthor, Trixie Mattel |
| 2025 | "Jingle Bells” | Grant & Ash | Non-album single | James Lord Pierpont | Drew Louis |
| 2025 | "Sagittarius (Shoot Your Shot)" (featuring Lorna Courtney) | Retrograde The Musical | Retrograde The Musical (Studio Cast Recording) | Drew Louis, Jesse Saint John, Nick Laughlin, Richard C. Walter | Drew Louis |
| 2025 | "Scorpio (Death Stare)" (featuring Zane Phillips) | Retrograde The Musical | Retrograde The Musical (Studio Cast Recording) | Drew Louis, Jesse Saint John, Nick Laughlin, Richard C. Walter | Drew Louis |
| 2025 | "Haus" (featuring Jewels Sparkles, Sam Star & Allura The Doll) | Trinity the Tuck | Non-album single | Drew Louis, Ryan Taylor, Allura The Doll | Drew Louis |
| 2025 | "Libra (Fairest of Them All)" (featuring Bonnie McKee) | Retrograde The Musical | Retrograde The Musical (Studio Cast Recording) | Drew Louis, Jesse Saint John, Nick Laughlin, Richard C. Walter | Drew Louis |
| 2025 | "Butterfly Effect" (Dave Audé Remix) | Shontelle Sparkles | Butterfly Effect (Deluxe Edition) | Drew Louis, Shawn Davis Berger, Coen Hutton | Drew Louis |
| 2025 | "Beauty School Dropout" (featuring London Hill) | Shontelle Sparkles | Butterfly Effect (Deluxe Edition) | Drew Louis, Shawn Davis Berger, Jayelle, Juliana Jonhope | Drew Louis |
| 2025 | "Beauty School Dropout" (featuring Sasha Colby) | Shontelle Sparkles | Butterfly Effect (Deluxe Edition) | Drew Louis, Shawn Davis Berger, Jayelle | Drew Louis |
| 2025 | "Glow Up" (featuring Pangina Heals) | Shontelle Sparkles | Butterfly Effect (Deluxe Edition) | Drew Louis, Shawn Davis Berger, Coen Hutton | Drew Louis |
| 2025 | "Phantom Lover" | Shontelle Sparkles | Butterfly Effect (Deluxe Edition) | Drew Louis, Shawn Davis Berger, Coen Hutton | Drew Louis |
| 2025 | "Calling The Corners" (featuring Angelica Ross, Hym & Trinity the Tuck) | Shontelle Sparkles | Butterfly Effect (Deluxe Edition) | Drew Louis, Shawn Davis Berger, Coen Hutton, Hym | Drew Louis |
| 2025 | "Intro" (featuring Angelica Ross) | Shontelle Sparkles | Butterfly Effect (Deluxe Edition) | Drew Louis, Shawn Davis Berger, Coen Hutton | Drew Louis |
| 2025 | "One & Done" (featuring Jayelle) | Chapter & Verse | Non-album singles | Drew Louis, Barry Pearson, Max Vernon, Jayelle Gerber | Drew Louis, Chapter & Verse |
| 2025 | "Disney Adult” | Grant & Ash | Non-album singles | Drew Louis, Grant Gibbs, Ashley Gill, Nick Laughlin | Drew Louis |
| 2025 | "Virgo (Lists & Receipts)" (featuring Liisi LaFontaine & Apocalypse Noir) | Retrograde The Musical | Retrograde The Musical (Studio Cast Recording) | Drew Louis, Jesse Saint John, Nick Laughlin, Richard C. Walter | Drew Louis |
| 2025 | "Escape Artist" | Ariel Bellvalaire | Ariel | Drew Louis, Ariel Melanie Weinstein, Jayelle Rebecca Gerber | Drew Louis |
| 2025 | "Happy Ending” | Shontelle Sparkles | Butterfly Effect | Drew Louis, Shawn Davis Berger, Coen Hutton, Filipe Sousa | Drew Louis, Phluze |
| 2025 | "Butterfly Effect” | Shontelle Sparkles | Butterfly Effect | Drew Louis, Shawn Davis Berger, Coen Hutton | Drew Louis |
| 2025 | "Diamond Dust” | Shontelle Sparkles | Butterfly Effect | Drew Louis, Shawn Davis Berger, Coen Hutton | Drew Louis |
| 2025 | "Glow Up” | Shontelle Sparkles | Butterfly Effect | Drew Louis, Shawn Davis Berger, Coen Hutton | Drew Louis |
| 2025 | "Leo (PartyStar)" (featuring Vincint) | Retrograde The Musical | Retrograde The Musical (Studio Cast Recording) | Drew Louis, Jesse Saint John, Nick Laughlin, Richard C. Walter | Drew Louis |
| 2025 | "City of Angels” | Jake Warden | Non-album singles | Drew Louis, Jake Warden, Jayelle Gerber, Julian Bell | Drew Louis |
| 2025 | "Crashout” | Ashnia | Non-album singles | Drew Louis, Ashley Blue Defrancesco, Nia Ivy | Drew Louis |
| 2025 | "Yes Girl” | Olivia Ruby | Non-album singles | Drew Louis, Olivia Ruby, Jayelle Gerber | Drew Louis |
| 2025 | "Beauty School Dropout” | Shontelle Sparkles | Butterfly Effect | Drew Louis, Jayelle, Shawn Davis Berger | Drew Louis |
| 2025 | "Found It” | Manda Malina | Non-album single | Drew Louis, Jayelle | Drew Louis |
| 2025 | "Cancer (Boo Hoo)" (featuring Matt Rogers) | Retrograde The Musical | Retrograde The Musical (Studio Cast Recording) | Drew Louis, Jesse Saint John, Nick Laughlin, Richard C. Walter | Drew Louis |
| 2025 | "Twink Death" | Grant Gibbs | Non-album singles | Drew Louis, Grant Gibbs | Drew Louis |
| 2025 | "Barnes & Noble” | Grant & Ash | Non-album singles | Drew Louis, Grant Gibbs, Ashley Gill | Drew Louis |
| 2025 | "Gemini (Two Sides of the Same Coin)" (featuring Jan) | Retrograde The Musical | Retrograde The Musical (Studio Cast Recording) | Drew Louis, Nick Laughlin, Richard C. Walter | Drew Louis |
| 2025 | "Big Top” | Jimbo | Non-album singles | Drew Louis, James Insell, Jayelle, Coen Hutton | Drew Louis |
| 2025 | "Big Pink Blunt” | Rosé | Non-album singles | Drew Louis, Ross McCorkell, Jayelle | Drew Louis, Ross McCorkell |
| 2025 | "Got It From Her" (featuring Trinity the Tuck) | Sam Star | Non-album singles | Drew Louis, Sam Star | Drew Louis |
| 2025 | "Aries (Dazzled)" (featuring Dylan Mulvaney) | Retrograde The Musical | Retrograde The Musical (Studio Cast Recording) | Jesse Saint John, Nick Laughlin, Richard Walter | Drew Louis, Zhone |
| 2025 | "Souvenirs” | Rachel Levin | Non-album singles | Rachel Levin, Rachel West | Drew Louis, Nicolas Farmakalidis |
| 2025 | "Cherry" | Jules Liesl | Non-album singles | Drew Louis, Jules Liesl, Charlotte Reed, Dex Barstad, JoJo Centineo, Reysha Rami | Drew Louis, JoJo Centineo, Phoenix Stone, Dextreau |
| 2025 | "Supermodel (You Betta Work)” | Trixie Mattel & Vincint | Non-album singles | RuPaul Andre Charles, James Harry, Lawrence Thom | Drew Louis, Paul Coultrup, Trixie Mattel |
| 2025 | "Baddest Habit" | Rose Rey | Non-album singles | Drew Louis, Rose Rey, Max Vernon | Drew Louis |
| 2025 | "Say Yeehaw!” | Sam Star | Non-album singles | Drew Louis, Sam Star | Drew Louis |
| 2025 | "She's Giving” | Lexi Love | Non-album singles | Drew Louis, Lexi Love, Timothy Liedel | Drew Louis |
| 2025 | "La Leche" | Jewels Sparkles | Non-album singles | Drew Louis, Jewels Sparkles | Drew Louis |
| 2024 | "It's A Wrap” | Trinity the Tuck | Non-album singles | Drew Louis, Ryan Taylor | Drew Louis |
| 2024 | "Put It Down" | Bijou & Jayelle | Non-album singles | Drew Louis, Benjamin Dorman, Jayelle, Max Vernon | Bijou |
| 2024 | "Don Cheadle” | Grant & Ash | A Twink and a Redhead | Drew Louis, Grant Gibbs, Ashley Gill | Drew Louis |
| 2024 | "Sixth Grade Carnival” | Grant & Ash | A Twink and a Redhead | Drew Louis, Grant Gibbs, Ashley Gill | Drew Louis |
| 2024 | "BJ Maxx” | Grant & Ash | A Twink and a Redhead | Drew Louis, Grant Gibbs, Ashley Gill | Drew Louis |
| 2024 | "Ms. Claus” | Jillian Rossi | Non-album single | Drew Louis, Jillian Rossi, Jayelle, Max Vernon | Drew Louis |
| 2024 | "Heterosexuality” | Grant & Ash | A Twink and a Redhead | Drew Louis, Nick Laughlin, Grant Gibbs, Ashley Gill | Drew Louis |
| 2024 | "Six Six Sex" (featuring Jewels Sparkles, Sam Star, & Shontelle Sparkles) | Trinity the Tuck | Sinematic (Deluxe) | Drew Louis, Jayelle, Coen Hutton | Drew Louis |
| 2024 | "Witch Hunt” | Jayelle | Non-album single | Drew Louis, Jayelle | Drew Louis |
| 2024 | "Panera" | Grant & Ash | A Twink and a Redhead | Drew Louis, Grant Gibbs, Ashley Gill | Drew Louis |
| 2024 | "Sleeping Beauty" | Trinity the Tuck | Sinematic | Drew Louis, Jayelle, Coen Hutton, Myah Marie | Drew Louis |
| 2024 | "Let Them Eat Cake" | Trinity the Tuck | Sinematic | Drew Louis, Jayelle, Max Vernon | Drew Louis |
| 2024 | "Give it Up" | Trinity the Tuck | Sinematic | Drew Louis, Jayelle, Sierra Cornell | Drew Louis |
| 2024 | "'Til Death Becomes Us" (featuring Jujubee) | Trinity the Tuck | Sinematic | Drew Louis, Jayelle, Coen Hutton | Drew Louis |
| 2024 | "Money Mad” | Trinity the Tuck | Sinematic | Drew Louis, Jayelle, Violet Skies | Drew Louis |
| 2024 | "Detonate" | Trinity the Tuck | Sinematic | Drew Louis, Jayelle, Coen Hutton | Drew Louis |
| 2024 | "Miss Jesus Christ" | Trinity the Tuck | Sinematic | Drew Louis, Jayelle, Ash Gordon | Drew Louis |
| 2024 | "A Twink and a Redhead" | Grant & Ash | A Twink and a Redhead | Drew Louis, Grant Gibbs, Ashley Gill | Drew Louis |
| 2024 | "Til the Clock Strikes" | Ariel Bellvalaire | Non-album singles | Drew Louis, Ariel Bellvalaire, Jayelle | Drew Louis |
| 2024 | "Take it Slow" | Joe Serafini | Non-album singles | Drew Louis, Jayelle, Joe Serafini | Drew Louis |
| 2024 | "Good Morning" | Yena | Good Morning | Drew Louis, Mayu Wakisaka, Jayelle, 72, Pollock, Jonathan Sim, Twlv, Yena | Pollock, Jonathan Sim, 72 |
| 2024 | "Lost Angel" | Kylie Sonique Love | Non-album singles | Drew Louis, Kylie Sonique Love | Drew Louis |
| 2024 | "Nice To Meet Ya" | Victory Brooks | Non-album singles | Drew Louis, Jayelle | Drew Louis |
| 2024 | "My Kitty" | Amanda Tori Meating | Non-album singles | Drew Louis, Amanda Tori Meating | Drew Louis |
| 2023 | "Ex Miss" | Kylie Sonique Love | Non-album singles | Drew Louis, Jayelle, Kylie Sonique Love | Drew Louis |
| 2023 | "Keep Up" | Karma Carr | Non-album singles | Drew Louis, Jayelle, Karma Carr | Drew Louis |
| 2023 | "Good Enough" (featuring Alaska Thunderfuck, Jimbo, Manila Luzon, Ginger Minj, Aria B. Cassadine, Kylie Sonique Love) | Trinity the Tuck | Trinity Ruins Christmas: The Musical | Drew Louis, Jayelle | Drew Louis |
| 2023 | "Eternity to Me" (featuring Alaska Thunderfuck) | Trinity the Tuck | Trinity Ruins Christmas: The Musical | Drew Louis, Jayelle | Drew Louis |
| 2023 | "I'm Rich, But I'll Change" | Trinity the Tuck | Trinity Ruins Christmas: The Musical | Drew Louis | Drew Louis |
| 2023 | "You Just Need a Little Mary" | Trinity the Tuck | Trinity Ruins Christmas: The Musical | Drew Louis | Drew Louis |
| 2023 | "A Massive Shadow" | Trinity the Tuck | Trinity Ruins Christmas: The Musical | Drew Louis | Drew Louis |
| 2023 | "Light in the Dark" (featuring Aria B. Cassadine, Kylie Sonique Love) | Trinity the Tuck | Trinity Ruins Christmas: The Musical | Drew Louis, Jayelle | Drew Louis |
| 2023 | "The Clock Strikes One" | Trinity the Tuck | Trinity Ruins Christmas: The Musical | Drew Louis | Drew Louis |
| 2023 | "Guilt's So Heavy" (featuring Ginger Minj) | Trinity the Tuck | Trinity Ruins Christmas: The Musical | Drew Louis, Jayelle | Drew Louis |
| 2023 | "A Curious Thing Happened" | Trinity the Tuck | Trinity Ruins Christmas: The Musical | Drew Louis | Drew Louis |
| 2023 | "Trinity Ruins Christmas" (featuring Jimbo, Manila Luzon) | Trinity the Tuck | Trinity Ruins Christmas: The Musical | Drew Louis, Jennifer Whitlock, Mark Byers, Ryan Taylor | Drew Louis |
| 2023 | "It's In The Book" (featuring Alaska Thunderfuck) | Trinity the Tuck | Trinity Ruins Christmas: The Musical | Drew Louis | Drew Louis |
| 2023 | "Drag Isn't Dangerous" | Jayelle & Ocean Kelly | Non-album singles | Drew Louis, Ash Gordon, Ocean Kelly | Drew Louis |
| 2023 | "Sugar Rush" | Ceranda | Non-album singles | Drew Louis, Ceranda Michelle Silva, Jayelle | Drew Louis |
| 2022 | "Lxxk 2 U" | Yena | Smiley | Drew Louis, Yena, Mayu Wakisaka, Jayelle, 72, Pollock, Jonathan Sim, Moon Da-eun, Nam-Hye-ju | Ollipop |
| 2022 | "Vacay" | Yena | Smiley | Drew Louis, Mayu Wakisaka, Jayelle, 72, Pollock, Kang Eun-jung | Pollock |
| 2022 | "Ur Next Ex Gf" | Jayelle | Non-album singles | Drew Louis, Jayelle | Drew Louis |
| 2022 | "Rock Bottom" | Jayelle | Non-album singles | Drew Louis, Jayelle | Drew Louis |
| 2022 | "Queen" | Jayelle | Non-album singles | Drew Louis, Jayelle | Drew Louis |
| 2021 | "Natural Disaster" (feat. Dante Juhkel) | Jayelle | Pretty Little Saboteur | Drew Louis, Jayelle, Dante Juhkel, Shoshana Rosemarin | Drew Louis |
| 2021 | "Men Are Candy" | Jayelle | Non-album singles | Drew Louis, Jayelle | Drew Louis |
| 2021 | "Double Standard" | Jayelle | Non-album singles | Drew Louis, Jayelle, Mel Johnson | Drew Louis, Mel Johnson |
| 2021 | "Antisocial Media" | Shiragirl | Non-album singles | Drew Louis, Jayelle, Alexandra Nicole Windsor, Constance Antoinette Day, Rain Palladino, Shira Leigh Yevin | Drew Louis |
| 2021 | "Loving Out Loud" | The Gospellers | A Cappella 2 | Drew Louis, Mayu Wakisaka, Joe Ryan III | No producer credited |

=== As lead artist ===
==== Singles ====
| Year | Title | Album | Writer(s) | Producer(s) |
|---|---|---|---|---|
| 2023 | "Love So Right" | Non-album singles | Drew Louis, Jayelle, Matt Beckley | Drew Louis, Matt Beckley |
| 2022 | "Winter Fling" | Non-album singles | Drew Louis | Drew Louis |
| 2022 | "Poser" (with Milli2nd) | Non-album singles | Drew Louis, Jayelle, Milli2nd | Drew Louis, Milli2nd |
| 2022 | "Bottom of the Bottle" | Baby's First Heartbreak | Drew Louis, Jayelle, Shoshana Rosemarin | Drew Louis |
| 2021 | "First Date" | Non-album singles | Drew Louis, Jayelle | Drew Louis |
| 2021 | "Ultraviolet" | Non-album singles | Drew Louis, Jayelle, Odin Cheesebro | Drew Louis, Odin Cheesebro |
| 2021 | "Petty" | Non-album singles | Drew Louis, Jayelle, Carlee Chappell, Francis Karel | Drew Louis |
| 2021 | "Falling in Like" | Non-album singles | Drew Louis, Jayelle | Drew Louis |
| 2020 | "Blocked" | Non-album singles | Drew Louis, Jayelle | Drew Louis |

==== Extended plays ====
| Title | Details |
|---|---|
| Baby's First Heartbreak | Released: March 24, 2022; Label: Self-released; Format: Digital download, streaming; Track listing: 1. "New Lover"; 2. "Bottom of the Bottle"; 3. "Get You Back"; 4. "Closure" |

=== As featured artist ===
==== Singles ====
| Year | Title | Artist(s) | Album | Writer(s) | Producer(s) |
|---|---|---|---|---|---|
| 2026 | "Play (Trixie Mattel Remix)" | Jennifer Lopez, Trixie Mattel & Drew Louis | J.Lo (25th Anniversary Edition) | Christina Milian, Arnthor Birgisson, Anders Bagge, Cory Rooney | Drew Louis, Bag & Arnthor, Trixie Mattel |

== Awards and nominations ==
| Year | Award ceremony | Nominee(s)/work(s) | Category | Result | Ref. |
|---|---|---|---|---|---|
| 2025 | Hollywood Independent Music Awards | "Til the Clock Strikes" (Ariel Bellvalaire) | Pop | Won | |
| 2025 | The Queerties | "A Twink and a Redhead" (Grant & Ash) | Anthem | Nominated | |
| 2023 | Live Nation Music Forward | Drew Louis | LGBTQ+ Emerging Artist | Won | |
