= Sam Bunting =

British cosmetic dermatologist

Dr Sam Bunting
- Citizenship: British
- Education: University College London
- Occupation: Cosmetic Dermatologist
- Years active: 2002-present
- Television: Extreme Beauty Disasters

Sam Bunting is a British cosmetic dermatologist. She is the founder of the skincare brand Dr Sam's Skincare and operates a cosmetic dermatology clinic on Harley Street in London. Bunting previously worked as a physician within the National Health Service.

== Early life and education ==
Bunting was raised in Donaghadee, Northern Ireland. She studied medicine at the University of Cambridge and University College London. Bunting became a member of the Royal College of Physicians in 2002.

== Career ==
After completing her medical degree and postgraduate training, she undertook specialist training in medical dermatology. She has worked in both National Health Service (NHS) and private clinical practice. During her NHS career, she trained and worked at hospitals including King's College Hospital, Barts and The London NHS Trust, the Royal Free Hospital, Kingston Hospital, Norfolk and Norwich University Hospital, and Guy's and St Thomas' NHS Foundation Trust (2004–2008). She later worked as a locum consultant dermatologist at Whittington Hospital in London and Queen Victoria Hospital in East Grinstead (2008–2011). In 2010, she founded a private dermatology clinic based on Harley Street in London.

Bunting practised medicine in London hospitals for seven years. Her clinical rotations included Guy's and St Thomas' and St Bartholomew's. She left public practice in 2010 to establish a private clinic on Harley Street. Her clinical work focuses on the treatment of acne, rosacea, and melasma.

Bunting launched the direct-to-consumer skincare line, Dr Sam's Skincare, in 2018.

She has dispensed skincare advice on ITV's This Morning. She presented the TLC series Extreme Beauty Disasters, where cosmetics industry professionals assist victims of failed beauty procedures.

She has also served as a global ambassador for the Dolce & Gabbana skincare brand.

In 2023, she discussed the beauty industry's ethics and people's motivation for getting beauty treatments with the BBC's Darshini David.

During her clinical practice, she developed a treatment approach that emphasised simplified skincare routines. She reported that some patients attending her clinic had complex skincare regimens that contributed to skin irritation or congestion. She has further stated that products used on sensitive skin should avoid potential irritants, including essential oils.
