= Jewels Sparkles =

American drag queen and singer

- Born: Dario Rodriguez; 12 August 2001 (age 25); Miami, Florida, United States
- Occupations: Drag queen; singer
- Years active: 2020–present
- Television: RuPaul's Drag Race (season 17)
- Website: jewelssparklesdrag.com

Dario Rodriguez (born August 12, 2001) professionally known as Jewels Sparkles, is an American drag queen and singer. She is the first runner-up of the seventeenth season of RuPaul's Drag Race (2025).

== Early life ==
Rodriguez was raised in Miami, Florida before her family moved to Tampa for her dad's work. She is still based in Tampa. She is of Puerto Rican and Cuban heritage. Her father, Douglas Rodriguez, who appeared in episode 13 of RuPaul's Drag Race Season 17, is a chef and author, dubbed the "Godfather of Nuevo Latino Cuisine". He was also a contestant in Top Chef Masters season 1.

== Career ==
While visiting family in Puerto Rico, her cousin Alondra turned on Drag Race on the television, and Jewels got into drag right after. She cites Ariana Grande and Priscilla Presley as her drag inspirations.

She has been featured on Trinity the Tuck's single "Six Six Sex" alongside fellow Drag Race castmate Sam Star, and drag mother Shontelle Sparkles. On the debut episode of RuPaul's Drag Race Season 17, she performed her debut single "La Leche", produced and co-written by Drew Louis. She won the last challenge of the season. Her Instagram following grew by 1,254 percent as the show aired.

== Discography ==
All credits adapted from Apple Music and Spotify.

=== Singles ===
==== As lead artist ====
List of singles as lead artist, showing year released, and album name
Title	Year	Album	Writer(s)	Producers(s)
"La Leche"	2025	Non-album single	Drew Louis and Jewels Sparkles	Drew Louis

==== As featured artist ====
List of singles as featured artist, showing year released, and album name
Title	Year	Album	Writer(s)	Producers(s)
"Six Six Sex" (Trinity the Tuck featuring Jewels Sparkles, Sam Star, and Shontelle Sparkles)	2024	Sinematic (Deluxe)	Drew Louis, Jayelle, and Coen Hutton	Drew Louis
"HAUS" (Trinity the Tuck featuring Jewels Sparkles, Sam Star, and Allura The Doll)	2025	Non-album single	Drew Louis, Ryan Taylor, Allura The Doll	Drew Louis

== Videography ==
=== Music videos ===
List of music videos, showing year released, and director(s)
Title	Year	Other artist(s)	Director(s)	Album	Ref.
As featured artist
"Six Six Sex"	2024	Trinity the Tuck, Sam Star, and Shontelle Sparkles	Ron Katagiri	Sinematic (Deluxe)	

== Filmography ==
=== Television ===
List of television credits, with selected details
Title	Year	Role	Notes	Ref.
RuPaul's Drag Race	2025	Contestant	1st Runner-Up	
