= Nia Ivy =

American influencer and singer

- Born: Nia Ivy; August 31, 2004 (age 21); St. Charles, Missouri
- Occupations: Influencer; singer

TikTok information
- Page: yviain
- Followers: 1.3 million
- Last updated: July 9 2025

Nia Ivy is an American influencer and singer. She is known for her impersonations of Nicki Minaj, Britney Spears, and Kim Kardashian.

== Personal life ==
Nia Ivy was raised in St. Charles, Missouri and decided to pursue content creation after graduating high school.

== Career ==
Ivy first started posting on Musical.ly at the age of 10. Ivy attended the BET Awards in June 2023. In August 2023, she attended the MTV Video Music Awards, and got attention from Summer Walker, Lil Mama, and Keke Palmer. In April 2025, Ivy attended the R.E.M. Beauty launch and made a video impersonating Nicki Minaj alongside Ariana Grande. Billboard stated, "...Nicki Minaj was certainly there in spirit via TikTok star Nia Ivy". In May 2025, she was nominated for a Shorty Award for TikTok Partnership with the New on Hulu campaign. In July 2025, she released her debut single "Encore". She told Dazed that she wrote it in twenty minutes, and recorded it in BandLab.

Ivy has done multiple parody collaborations with Ashley Blue Def, including a parody of "360" by Charli XCX under the name Ashnia. Ashnia's original debut single "Crashout" was released in August 2025, and was co-written and produced by Drew Louis.

== Discography ==
All credits adapted from Apple Music and Spotify.

=== As lead artist ===
==== Singles ====
Year	Title	Album	Writer(s)	Producer(s)
2025	"Encore"	Non-album single	Nia Ivy	No producer credited

=== With Ashnia ===
==== Singles ====
Year	Title	Album	Writer(s)	Producer(s)
2025	"Crashout"	Non-album single	Nia Ivy, Ashley Blue Defrancesco, Drew Louis	Drew Louis

== Awards ==
Year	Title	Award	Nominated work	Result
2025	Shorty Awards	TikTok Partnership	New on Hulu x Influencer Campaign	Nominated
