= Retrograde The Musical =

American musical about astrology

- Official promotional logo
- Music: Nick Laughlin; Richard C. Walter; Jesse Saint John; Drew Louis
- Lyrics: Nick Laughlin; Richard C. Walter; Jesse Saint John; Drew Louis
- Book: Nick Laughlin; Richard C. Walter

Retrograde The Musical is an astrology-based musical with the book by Nick Laughlin and Richard C. Walter, and music and lyrics by Laughlin, Walter, Jesse Saint John, and Drew Louis.

== Background ==
Retrograde The Musical started their rollout with twelve singles for each astrological sign released during each sign's season. The singles feature guest vocalists including Bonnie McKee, Dylan Mulvaney, Zane Phillips, Paolo Montalban, John Pinto Jr., Jan, Matt Rogers, Vincint, Liisi LaFontaine, Apocolypse Noir and Lorna Courtney.

In 2026, they are planning to release a musical concept album, Retrograde The Musical (Studio Cast Recording), including the twelve singles for each astrological sign, in addition to more plot driven songs written by Nick Laughlin, Richard C. Walter, Jesse Saint John, and Drew Louis. According to Playbill, they have plans to produce a stage production of the show after the studio cast recording album is released.

== Plot ==
The story follows Anna, an aspiring astronomer, as she navigates her womanhood and college experience. She first finds herself rejected from the astronomy program that her father founded. Then she encounters personified versions of the astrological signs, and all twelve signs introduce themselves with astrology driven pop songs. Ultimately, Anna discovers that there might be more to the stars than astronomy.

== Reviews ==
Rival Magazine described "Virgo (Lists & Receipts)" featuring Liisi LaFontaine and Apocalypse Noir as steady, deliberate, and quietly cutting. Too Much Love magazine noted that Bonnie McKee's performance on "Libra (Fairest of Them All)" did a good job blending pop music with theatrical energy.

== Discography ==
All credits adapted from Spotify and Apple Music.

=== Singles ===
Year	Title	Album	Writer(s)	Producer(s)
2025	"Capricorn (Gravity)" (featuring Paolo Montalban)	Retrograde The Musical (Studio Cast Recording)	Nick Laughlin, Richard C. Walter, Jesse Saint John, Drew Louis	Drew Louis
2025	"Sagittarius (Shoot Your Shot)" (featuring Lorna Courtney)	Retrograde The Musical (Studio Cast Recording)	Nick Laughlin, Richard C. Walter, Jesse Saint John, Drew Louis	Drew Louis
2025	"Scorpio (Death Stare)" (featuring Zane Phillips)	Retrograde The Musical (Studio Cast Recording)	Nick Laughlin, Richard C. Walter, Jesse Saint John, Drew Louis	Drew Louis
2025	"Libra (Fairest of Them All)" (featuring Bonnie McKee)	Retrograde The Musical (Studio Cast Recording)	Nick Laughlin, Richard C. Walter, Jesse Saint John, Drew Louis	Drew Louis
2025	"Virgo (Lists & Receipts)" (featuring Liisi LaFontaine & Apocolypse Noir)	Retrograde The Musical (Studio Cast Recording)	Nick Laughlin, Richard C. Walter, Jesse Saint John, Drew Louis	Drew Louis
2025	"Leo (PartyStar)" (featuring Vincint)	Retrograde The Musical (Studio Cast Recording)	Nick Laughlin, Richard C. Walter, Jesse Saint John, Drew Louis	Drew Louis
2025	"Cancer (Boo Hoo)" (featuring Matt Rogers)	Retrograde The Musical (Studio Cast Recording)	Nick Laughlin, Richard C. Walter, Jesse Saint John, Drew Louis	Drew Louis
2025	"Gemini (Two Sides of the Same Coin)" (featuring Jan)	Retrograde The Musical (Studio Cast Recording)	Nick Laughlin, Richard C. Walter, Drew Louis	Drew Louis
2025	"Taurus (Dope)" (featuring John Pinto Jr.)	Retrograde The Musical (Studio Cast Recording)	Nick Laughlin, Richard C. Walter, Jesse Saint John	Midi Jones
2025	"Aries (Dazzled)" (featuring Dylan Mulvaney)	Retrograde The Musical (Studio Cast Recording)	Nick Laughlin, Richard C. Walter, Jesse Saint John	Drew Louis, Zhone

=== Studio albums ===
Title	Details
Retrograde The Musical (Studio Cast Recording)	Scheduled: 2026
