= Winterlicious (album) =

Studio album by Debbie Gibson
- Released: October 21, 2022
- Genre: Pop; Christmas
- Length: 49:00
- Label: StarGirl
- Producer: Debbie Gibson; Sean Thomas; Fred Coury; Sylvia MacCalla; Joey Melotti; Joey Finger

Debbie Gibson chronology
The Body Remembers (2021)	Winterlicious (2022)

Singles from Winterlicious
- 1. "Christmas Star" Released: November 12, 2021; 2. "Heartbreak Holiday" Released: November 11, 2022

Winterlicious is the eleventh studio album by American singer-songwriter Debbie Gibson, released on October 21, 2022, independently by her own label StarGirl Records.

The album charted at number 91 on the US Billboard Top Current Album Sales chart.

== Overview ==
Winterlicious is Gibson's first Christmas album, featuring a mix of original songs and covers of popular Christmas carols. The lead single, "Christmas Star", was released on November 12, 2021. The album includes the song "Heartbreak Holiday", which marks Gibson's second duet with New Kids on the Block member Joey McIntyre after "Lost in Your Eyes, the Duet".

"Sleigh Ride" was originally recorded by Gibson on the 1992 various artists album A Very Special Christmas 2. Her rendition of "White Christmas" is a duet with her father Joe. "Cheers!" is an original New Year's Eve song Gibson wrote in memory of her late mother and former manager Diane.

To promote the album, Gibson hosted the Winterlicious holiday tour across the U.S. starting on November 25, 2022. Ariel Bellvalaire played guitar alongside Gibson for the tour.

== Track listing ==
No.	Title	Writer(s)	Producer(s)	Length
1.	"Let It Snow"	Sammy Cahn; Jule Styne	Gibson	2:48
2.	"I Wish Everyday Was Christmas"	Sylvia Maccalla	Maccalla; Sean Thomas	3:23
3.	"God Rest Ye Merry Gentlemen"	Traditional	Gibson; Thomas	3:10
4.	"Heartbreak Holiday" (duet with Joey McIntyre)	Gibson; McIntyre	Thomas	4:31
5.	"The Gift"	Gibson	Gibson	4:12
6.	"Christmas Star"	Gibson	Gibson; Thomas	3:18
7.	"Jingle Those Bells"	Gibson	Gibson; Thomas	3:17
8.	"The Candy Man"	Leslie Bricusse; Anthony Newley	Gibson; Joey Melotti	3:00
9.	"Christmas Dreams"	Gibson	Gibson; Thomas	3:13
10.	"Sleigh Ride" (Remastered)	Mitchell Parish; Leroy Anderson	Jimmy Iovine; Jai Winding; Omar Hakim	3:13
11.	"Jingle Bell Rock/The Christmas Song"	Joe Beal; Jim Boothe; Robert Wells; Mel Tormé	Gibson; Joey Finger	3:18
12.	"Illuminate"	Gibson	Gibson	4:07
13.	"White Christmas" (duet with Daddy Joe)	Irving Berlin	Gibson; Melotti	3:06
14.	"Cheers!"	Gibson	Fred Coury	4:24
Total length:				49:00

== Charts ==
Chart performance for Winterlicious
Chart (2022)	Peak position
US Top Current Album Sales (Billboard)	91
US Top Holiday Albums (Billboard)	17
