= Sinematic (Trinity the Tuck album) =

Studio album by Trinity the Tuck
- Released: May 31, 2024
- Length: 19:31
- Label: Producer Entertainment Group
- Producer: Drew Louis

Trinity the Tuck chronology
Trinity Ruins Christmas: The Musical (2023)	Sinematic (2024)

Singles from Sinematic
- 1. "'Til Death Becomes Us (featuring Jujubee)" Released: April 26, 2024; 2. "Miss Jesus Christ" Released: June 1, 2024; 3. "Six Six Sex (featuring Jewels Sparkles, Sam Star, & Shontelle Sparkles)" Released: October 4, 2024

Sinematic is a dark-pop concept album by American drag queen and recording artist Trinity the Tuck, released via the label Producer Entertainment Group on May 31, 2024. The album has seven tracks inspired by the seven deadly sins and features past Drag Race contestant Jujubee on "'Til Death Becomes Us".

== Composition ==
Sinematic has seven tracks, with each one conveying one the seven deadly sins. In an interview with PinkNews, Trinity stated "I wanted [this album] to take back this childhood trauma of fear of religion…". Executive producer Drew Louis cited musical inspiration from him and Trinity's shared love of dark pop music, and artists Britney Spears and The Pussycat Dolls. Louis oversaw production and writing of the album, which features songs co-written with Jayelle, Ash Gordon, Violet Skies, Sierra Cornell, Coen Hutton, Max Vernon, and Myah Marie. Jujubee is featured on the lead single "'Til Death Becomes Us", and the song and music video are an homage to the 1992 cult classic film, Death Becomes Her.

On September 20, 2024, Trinity announced a deluxe edition of the album was slated to release October 4. Third single "Six Six Sex" was released alongside the deluxe version featuring Shontelle Sparkles and RuPaul's Drag Race season 17 contestants Sam Star and Jewels Sparkles.

== Track listing ==
Track listing and credits adapted from Apple Music and Spotify.

Sinematic – Standard edition
No.	Title	Writer(s)	Producer(s)	Length
1.	"Miss Jesus Christ"	Drew Louis; Jayelle; Ash Gordon	Louis	2:56
2.	"Money Mad"	Louis; Jayelle; Violet Skies	Louis	2:58
3.	"Give It Up"	Louis; Jayelle; Sierra Cornell	Louis	2:40
4.	"'Til Death Becomes Us (featuring Jujubee)"	Louis; Jayelle; Coen Hutton	Louis	2:56
5.	"Let Them Eat Cake"	Louis; Jayelle; Max Vernon	Louis	2:22
6.	"Detonate"	Louis; Jayelle; Hutton	Louis	2:57
7.	"Sleeping Beauty"	Louis; Jayelle; Hutton; Myah Marie	Louis	2:42
Total length:				19:31

Sinematic – Deluxe edition
No.	Title	Writer(s)	Producer(s)	Length
1.	"Intro"	Ryan Taylor	Louis	0:56
9.	"Interlude"	Taylor	Louis	0:48
10.	"Six Six Sex (featuring Jewels Sparkles, Sam Star, & Shontelle Sparkles)"	Louis; Jayelle; Hutton	Louis	3:04
11.	"Let Them Eat Cake (featuring Kamera Type)"	Louis; Jayelle; Vernon; Kamera Tyme	Louis	2:22
12.	"'Til Death Becomes Us (Solo Version)"	Louis; Jayelle; Hutton	Louis	2:56
13.	"Six Six Sex (Solo Version)"	Louis; Jayelle; Hutton	Louis	3:06
14.	"Six Six Sex - Acapella (featuring Jewels Sparkles, Sam Star, & Shontelle Sparkles)"	Louis; Jayelle; Hutton	Louis	3:08
15.	"Give It Up (Tony Ni Remix)"	Louis; Jayelle; Cornell	Louis	3:24
16.	"Detonate (Slowed)"	Louis; Jayelle; Hutton	Louis	3:41
Total length:				42:54

== Personnel ==
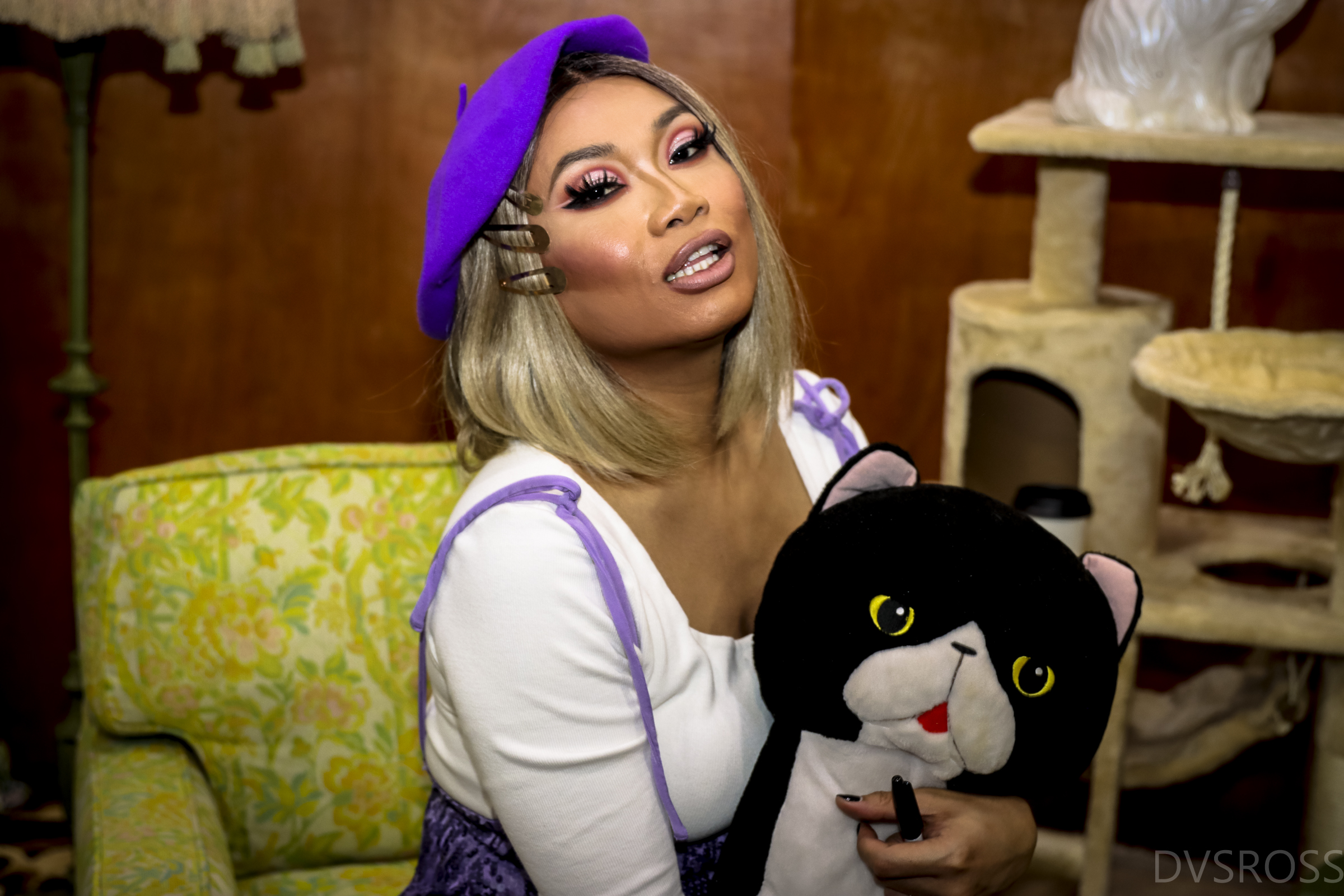
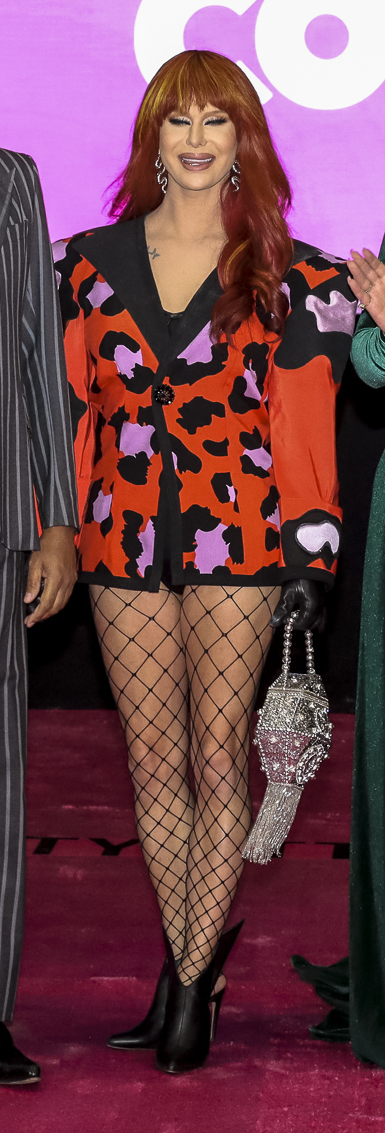
Jujubee (left) and Trinity the Tuck (right) collaborate on "'Til Death Becomes Us".
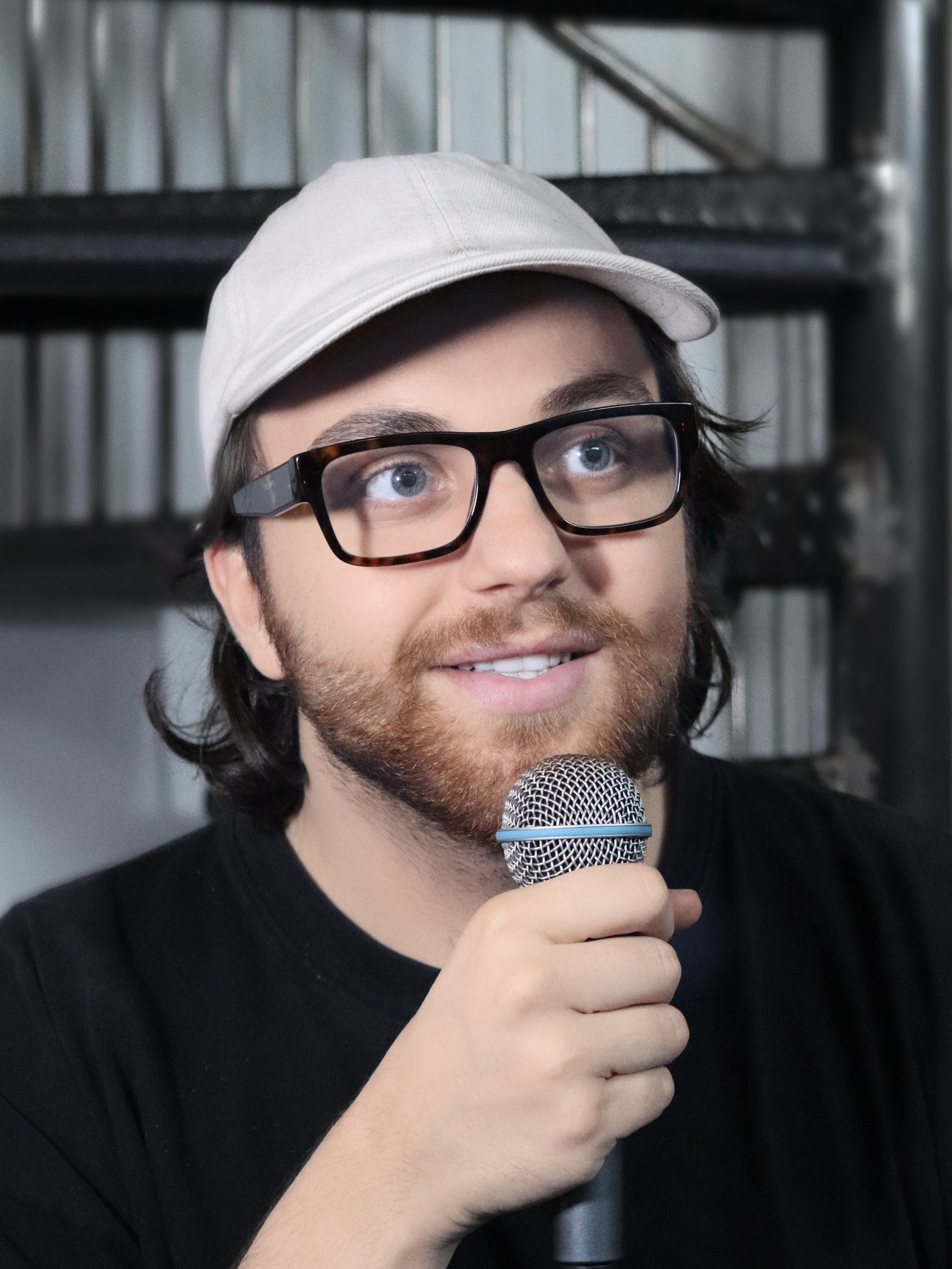
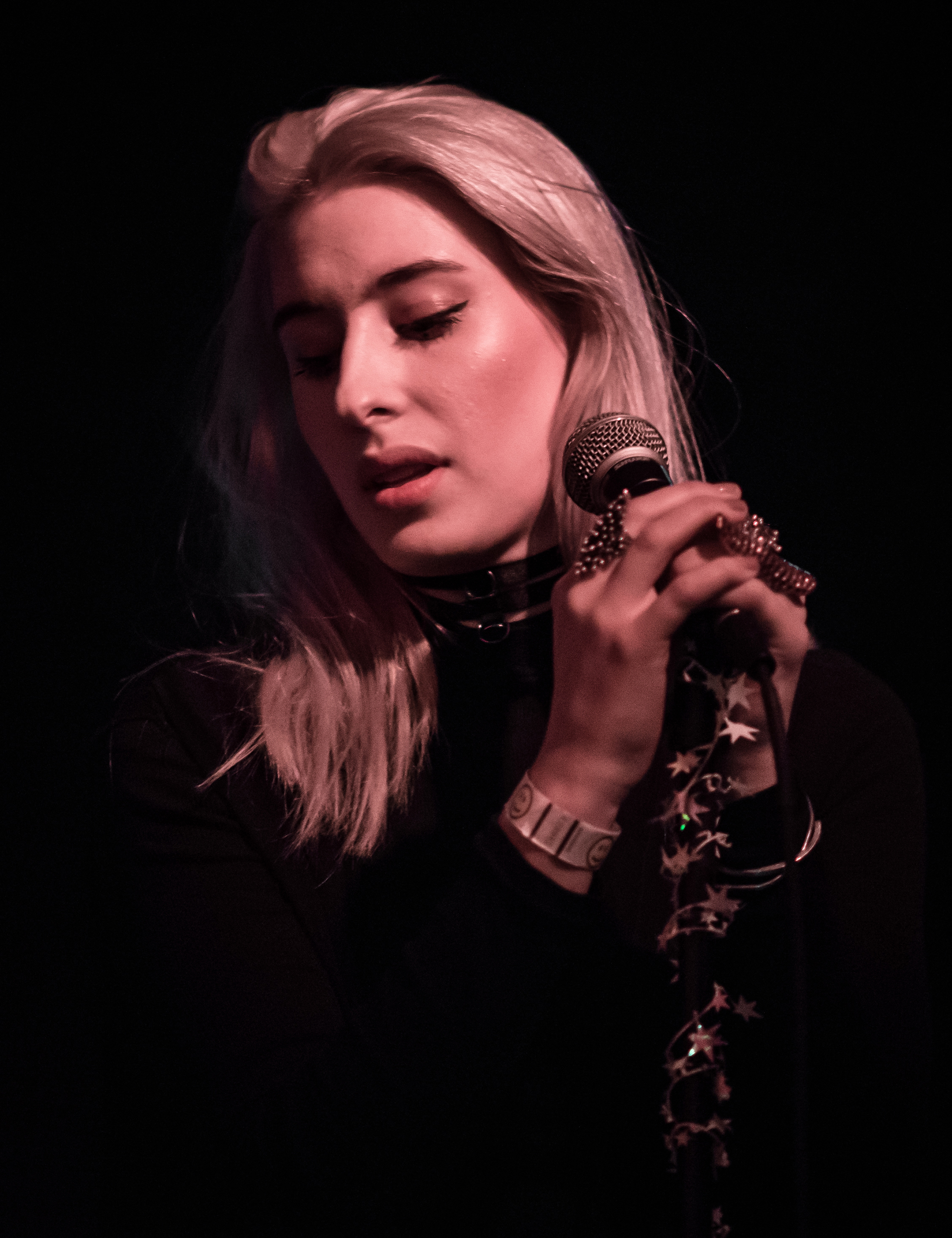
Producer Drew Louis (left) and songwriter Violet Skies (right) co-wrote "Money Mad" with Jayelle.

Personnel adapted from Apple Music and Spotify.

- Trinity the Tuck – primary artist
- Jujubee – featured artist, vocals
- Jewels Sparkles – featured artist, vocals
- Sam Star – featured artist, vocals
- Shontelle Sparkles – featured artist, vocals
- Kamera Tyme – featured artist, vocals
- Drew Louis – composer, producer
- Jayelle – composer
- Ash Gordon – composer
- Violet Skies – composer
- Sierra Cornell – composer
- Coen Hutton – composer
- Max Vernon – composer
- Myah Marie – composer
