= Rachel Levin (influencer) =

American internet personality and recording artist

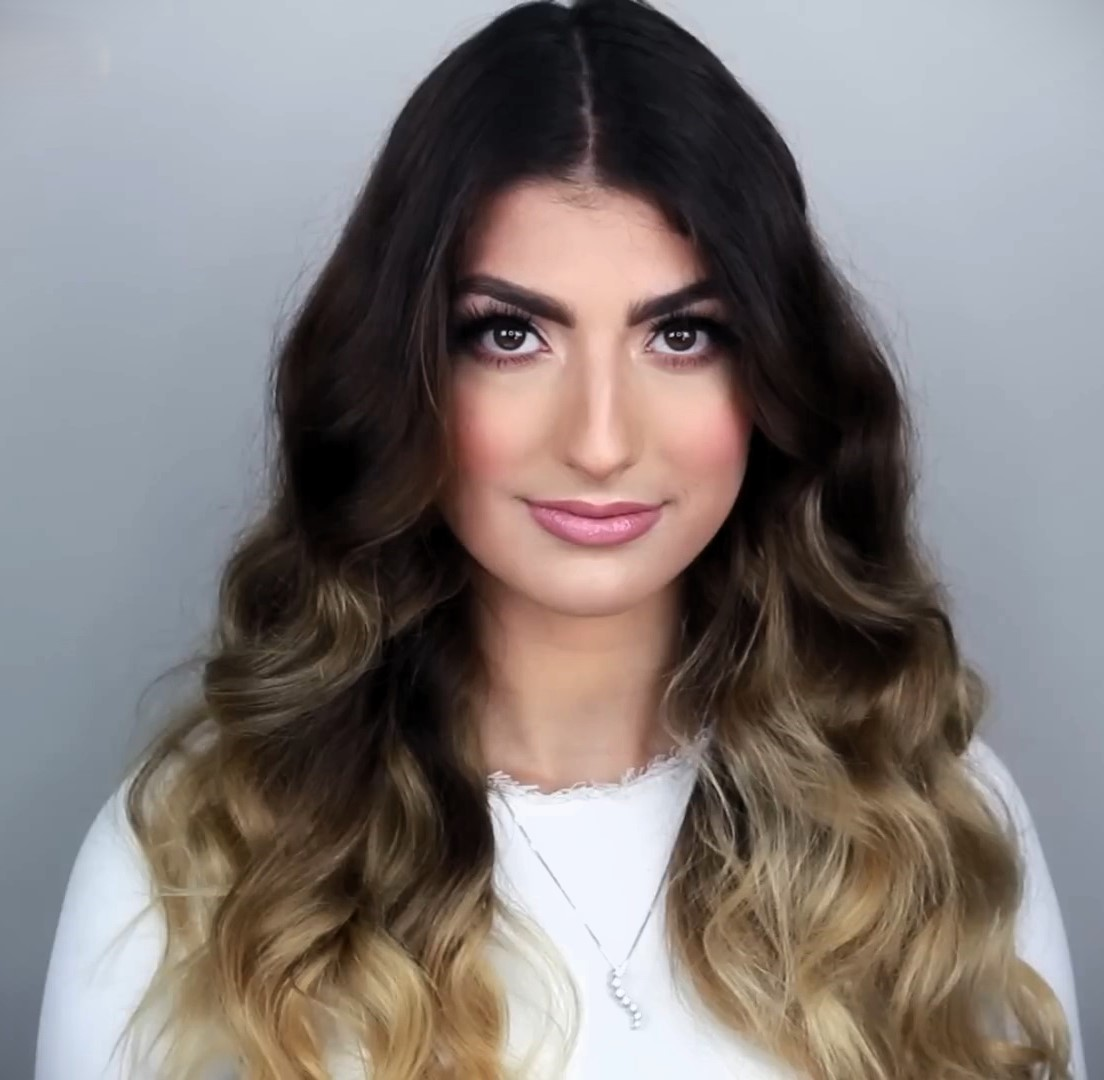
- Levin in 2016
- Born: Rachel Claire Levin; 24 February 1995; Philadelphia, Pennsylvania, U.S.
- Other name: Rclbeauty101
- Occupations: Influencer; content creator; recording artist

TikTok information
- Page: rclbeauty101
- Followers: 2 million

YouTube information
- Channel: Rclbeauty101
- Years active: 2011 - 2022
- Genres: Beauty; fashion; lifestyle; DIY; comedy
- Subscribers: 14.2 million
- Views: 3.9 billion
- Last updated: September 11, 2025
- Website: www.rclbeauty101.com

Rachel Claire Levin, known online as RCLBeauty101, is an American Internet personality and artist.

== Early life and education ==
Rachel Levin was born on February 24, 1995 in Philadelphia, Pennsylvania. Her father is a doctor and her mother is a lawyer.

Levin started uploading videos to her YouTube channel when she was 15, inspired by beauty videos she had watched on YouTube. Her first makeup tutorial video on YouTube was titled "How to Conceal Under Eye Dark Circles". She continued to regularly post videos, and at age 16, she was quoted in The Wall Street Journal in an article about the rising popularity of online makeup tutorials.

Levin graduated from Lower Merion High School and attended Penn State Brandywine for college, but left after a year. According to Levin, her YouTube channel was the source of bullying during her high school years.

== Career ==
In 2014, Levin had 350,000 subscribers to her YouTube channel. In addition to makeup tutorials, she started creating comedy videos, and her first comedy skit video was titled Back to School Expectations Vs. Reality!, which by 2016 had 25.7 million views.

By 2015, Levin had a total of 516 million views on her YouTube channel. In 2015, she was ranked as the top social media influencer under 21 by ZEFR, a marketing company that tracks social media engagement, and in August 2015, RCLBeauty101 was the YouTube channel with the most subscribers added that month. By 2016, she had more than 8 million subscribers to her YouTube channel and more than 60 million views on her video Disney Princess Slumber Party. Fans of her channel became known as "Levinators".

In 2017, she gained more than 222 million views on YouTube, with more than 11 million views for her Disney Princess Prom video. By 2019, she had more than 13 million YouTube subscribers; by 2020, more than 14 million; and by 2022, more than 14.4 million. In 2022, her channel was the 83rd most-subscribed YouTube channel in the United States. She is also very active on Snapchat, where she had 1.9 million subscribers as of March 2023.

Levin launched her own makeup brand RCLÓ Cosmetics in 2020. Levin also started her music career in 2020, when she debuted her first single, "Myself", which she co-wrote with Brent Morgan and released through Sun and Sky Records. According to Levin, she began recording music two years before the release of "Myself", racking up 30 unreleased songs. In 2022, she published her second single, "My Way", which is about not caring what other people think. She considers her musical style "pop with hip-hop undertones".

== Discography ==
All credits are adapted from Apple Music and Spotify.

=== As lead artist ===
==== Singles ====
Year	Title	Album	Writer(s)	Producer(s)
2025	“Souvenirs”	Non-album singles	Rachel Levin, Rachel West	Nicolas Farmakalidis, Drew Louis
2024	“IDWABF”	Non-album singles	Rachel Levin, Rachel West	NicoTheOwl
2024	”Lost in My Mind”	Non-album singles	Rachel Levin, Rachel West	Nicolas Farmakalidis
2024	“I’m Here”	Non-album singles	Rachel Levin, Rachel West	Nicolas Farmakalidis
2023	“Naive”	Non-album singles	Rachel Levin, Rachel West	NicoTheOwl
2023	”It’s Fine, It’s Not”	Non-album singles	Rachel Levin, Kyan Palmer, Rachel West	Scott David Stewart
2023	“Without Due Respect”	Non-album singles	Rachel Levin, Luke Shrestha, Rachel West, Simon Jay, Ysa Fernandez	Chapters
2023	"Crumbs"	Non-album singles	Rachel Levin, Dr. Debra Mandel, Jonathan Eley, Luke Shrestha, Rachel West, Simon H. Jay, Ysa Fernandez	No producer credited
2022	"My Way"	Non-album singles	Rachel Levin, Dylan Edmunds, Ethan Bortnick, Jeremiah Daly	Ethan Bortnick, Dylan Edmunds
2020	"Myself"	Non-album singles	Rachel Levin	No producer credited

== Awards and nominations ==
Year	Award	Category	Result
2015	Teen Choice Awards	Choice Web Star: Fashion/Beauty	Nominated
2015	Streamy Awards	Breakout Creator	Nominated
2015	Streamy Awards	Lifestyle	Nominated
2016	Streamy Awards	YouTube Beauty Guru	Nominated
2016	Shorty Awards	YouTube Guru	Nominated
2019	People's Choice Awards	Beauty Influencer	Nominated
2026	Snappy Awards	Best Storyteller	Won
