= Vincint =

American singer-songwriter

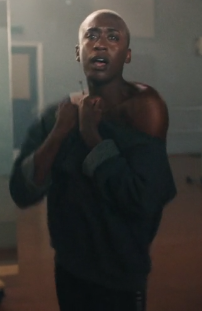
- Vincint in 2019
- Born: Vincint Cannady; Philadelphia, Pennsylvania, U.S.
- Education: Berklee College of Music
- Occupations: Singer; songwriter
- Years active: 2018–present
- Musical career
- Genre: Pop
- Instruments: Vocals; guitar; piano
- Label: Vincint Cannady

Vincint Cannady (born 1991), known by the mononym Vincint (stylized as VINCINT), is an American singer and songwriter. They are best known as a finalist on the first season of the singing competition The Four. They released their debut EP, The Feeling on February 14, 2020. They later released their debut studio album, There Will Be Tears on June 11, 2021.

== Early life and education ==
Vincint Cannady was born and raised in Philadelphia, Pennsylvania. Their father was a gospel singer in a group called the Christ United Gospel Singers, and Vincint began singing at the age of five. They were shy about singing as a child, but their father took them to audition for an all-boys choir audition when they were seven to nurture their interest. Cannady also wrote their first song when they were twelve. Vincint was raised Baptist but attended Catholic school growing up. They named Beyoncé, Whitney Houston, Céline Dion, Madonna, Britney Spears, Bjork, and Regina Spektor as early inspirations.

They attended college at Berklee College of Music and graduated in 2013.

== Career ==
=== 2018–2020: The Four and The Feeling ===
Vincint appeared on the first season of The Four one week before the finale, where they received unanimous "yes" votes from every judge after performing "Creep" by Radiohead. They stated in an interview that producers attempted to persuade them to sing gospel and R&B music due to their race, and some male producers refused to work with them. Vincint was eliminated in the first round of the finale competition along with contestant Zhavia Ward.

They released three singles in 2018: "Remember Me", "Mine", and "Marrow", which was their debut single. They released a music video for "Marrow" on February 8, 2018. The video was directed by Jake Wilson and shot in a church in North Hollywood, in an homage to Cannady's upbringing in Catholic school. The latter two singles were produced by Pretty Sister. Their singing style ranges from belting to whispery falsetto. They characterize their genre of music as pop.

On April 5, 2019, Cannady premiered a music video for the single "Please Don't Fall in Love", directed by Jasper Soloff. They released their debut EP, The Feeling, on February 14, 2020. Vincint's song, "Be Me", was selected as the anthem of the fifth season of Queer Eye. They also released the lead single from their debut album, "Hard 2 Forget".

=== 2021–present: There Will Be Tears and The Getaway Tour ===
On May 28, 2021, they released the single "Kill My Heart", featuring Parson James and Qveen Herby. They released the second single "Getaway", featuring Tegan and Sara, on June 9. Cannady released their debut album There Will Be Tears on June 11, 2021. Ari Shapiro of All Things Considered referred to the album as "vulnerable and danceable". The Getaway Tour is Cannady's debut concert tour, in support of their debut studio album, There Will Be Tears. The tour was originally set to run from January 12 to 30, 2022, but was rescheduled due to COVID-19. Vincint announced the rescheduled dates of The Getaway Tour, which ran from May 5 to 29, 2022. They performed the song "Mission" on the Love, Victor season three soundtrack, which was released on June 15, 2022.

In April 2025, Vincint released a cover of RuPaul's "Supermodel (You Better Work)" with Trixie Mattel, and performed it at Coachella.

== Personal life ==
Cannady is openly gay, and came out when they were sixteen. Cannady came out as non-binary on July 14, 2023.

== Discography ==
All credits adapted from Apple Music and Spotify.

=== As lead artist ===
==== Studio albums ====
Title	Details	Ref.
There Will Be Tears	Released: June 11, 2021; Label: Vincint Cannady; Format: streaming & digital download	

==== Extended plays ====
Title	Details	Ref.
The Feeling	Released: February 14, 2020; Label: Vincint Cannady; Format: streaming & digital download	

==== Singles ====
Title	Year	Album	Writer(s)	Producer(s)
"Marrow"	2018	Non-album singles	No writers credited	No producers credited
"Remember Me"	2018	Non-album singles	No writers credited	No producers credited
"Mine"	2018	Non-album singles	No writers credited	Zak Waters
"Someday"	2019	The Feeling	Andy Seltzer, Vincent Cannady	Andy Seltzer
"Save Myself"	2020	The Feeling	Brandon Colbein, Ryan Hartman, Vincent Cannady	Tido
"Hard 2 Forget"	2020	There Will Be Tears	James Abrahart, Vincent Cannady	Harrison Mead
"Higher" (featuring Alex Newell and Princess Precious)	2021	There Will Be Tears	James Abrahart, Harrison Mead, Vincent Cannady	JHart, Storyboards
"All Over Again"	2021	There Will Be Tears	Sam DeRosa	No producers credited
"Kill My Heart" (featuring Parson James and Qveen Herby)	2021	There Will Be Tears	JHart	No producers credited
"Getaway" (featuring Tegan and Sara)	2021	There Will Be Tears	No writers credited	No producers credited
"Taste So Good (The Cann Song)" (featuring Hayley Kiyoko, MNEK and Kesha)	2022	Non-album singles	Leland	No producers credited
"Romance"	2023	Non-album singles	Uzoechi Emenike, Vincent Cannady	MNEK, Storyboards
"Take Me Home"	2023	Non-album singles	Cici Ward, Vincent Cannady	John Greenham, Tiggs
"Good II Me"	2024	Non-album singles	Tima Dee, Vincent Cannady	The 87's
"LEAN"	2024	Non-album singles	Antti Riihimäki, Joona Pietkäinen, Lara Andersson, Vincent Cannady	RZY, Skywalk
"Another Lover" (featuring Adam Lambert)	2024	Non-album singles	Annie Schindel, Antti Rihimäki, Vincent Cannady	RZY, Skywalk
"Love Me Tonight" (featuring Betty Who)	2024	Non-album singles	Nicolas DiPietrantonio, Tyler Mann, Vincent Cannady	Nicopop, Storyboards
"Happens All The Time" (Vincint with Party Pupils, and Durand Bernarr)	2024	Non-album singles	Durand Bernarr, Ryan Siegal, Vincent Cannady	Party Pupils
"Supermodel (You Betta Work)" (Trixie Mattel with Vincint)	2025	Non-album singles	James Harry, Lawrence Thom, RuPaul Andre Charles	Trixie Mattel, Paul Coultrup, Drew Louis

=== As featured artist ===
==== Singles ====
Title	Year	Album	Writer(s)	Producer(s)
"Leo (PartyStar)" (Retrograde The Musical featuring Vincint)	2025	Retrograde The Musical (Studio Cast Recording)	Drew Louis, Richard C. Walter, Jesse Saint John, Nick Laughlin	Drew Louis

== Filmography ==
=== Television ===
Title	Year	Role	Notes	Ref.
The Four	2018	Themself/Contestant	"Season One - Episodes 5 & 6"	
Watch What Happens Live with Andy Cohen	2021	Themself/Guest Star	"Season Eighteen - Episode 139"	

== Awards and nominations ==
Award	Year	Nominee(s)/work(s)	Category	Result	Ref.
GLAAD Media Awards	2022	There Will Be Tears	Outstanding Breakthrough Music Artist	Nominated	
