= Jake Warden =

American influencer, makeup artist, and singer

- Born: Jake Warden; February 20, 2002 (age 24)
- Occupations: Influencer; singer; make-up artist

Instagram information
- Page: Jake Warden
- Genres: makeup; beauty
- Followers: 1.47 million

TikTok information
- Page: Jake Warden
- Genres: makeup; beauty
- Followers: 2.4 million

YouTube information
- Channel: Jake Warden
- Genres: Vlog; makeup; beauty
- Subscribers: 1.21 million
- Views: 94.7 million
- Last updated: January 1, 2026

Jake Warden (born February 20, 2002) is an American influencer, singer and make-up artist. He is currently a brand ambassador for Dolce & Gabbana beauty.

== Early life ==
Jake Warden is originally from Longmont, Colorado. In an interview with Yahoo Finance, Warden stated that he uses makeup as personal expression and that it does not conflict with his gender identity.

== Career ==
In 2013, Warden started his YouTube channel at the age of eleven. In April 2017, a video of Warden using the back of his phone as a palette to mix foundation went viral. In September 2020, Warden was named one of Paper Magazine's Paper People of 2020. In April 2024, Warden was officially announced as the global makeup expert for Dolce & Gabbana. In an interview with Cosmopolitan Italia, he stated "It's an honor to be representing this brand...". In August 2025, he released his debut single "City of Angels", co-written and produced by Drew Louis.

== Discography ==
All song credits adapted from Apple Music and Spotify.

=== As lead artist ===
==== Singles ====
Year	Title	Album	Writer(s)	Producer(s)
2025	"City of Angels"	Non-album single	Jake Warden, Drew Louis, Jayelle Gerber, Julian Bell	Drew Louis

== Awards ==
Year	Title	Award	Nominated work	Result
2018	Shorty Awards	Best in Beauty	Himself	Nominated
