= Jules Liesl =

American singer

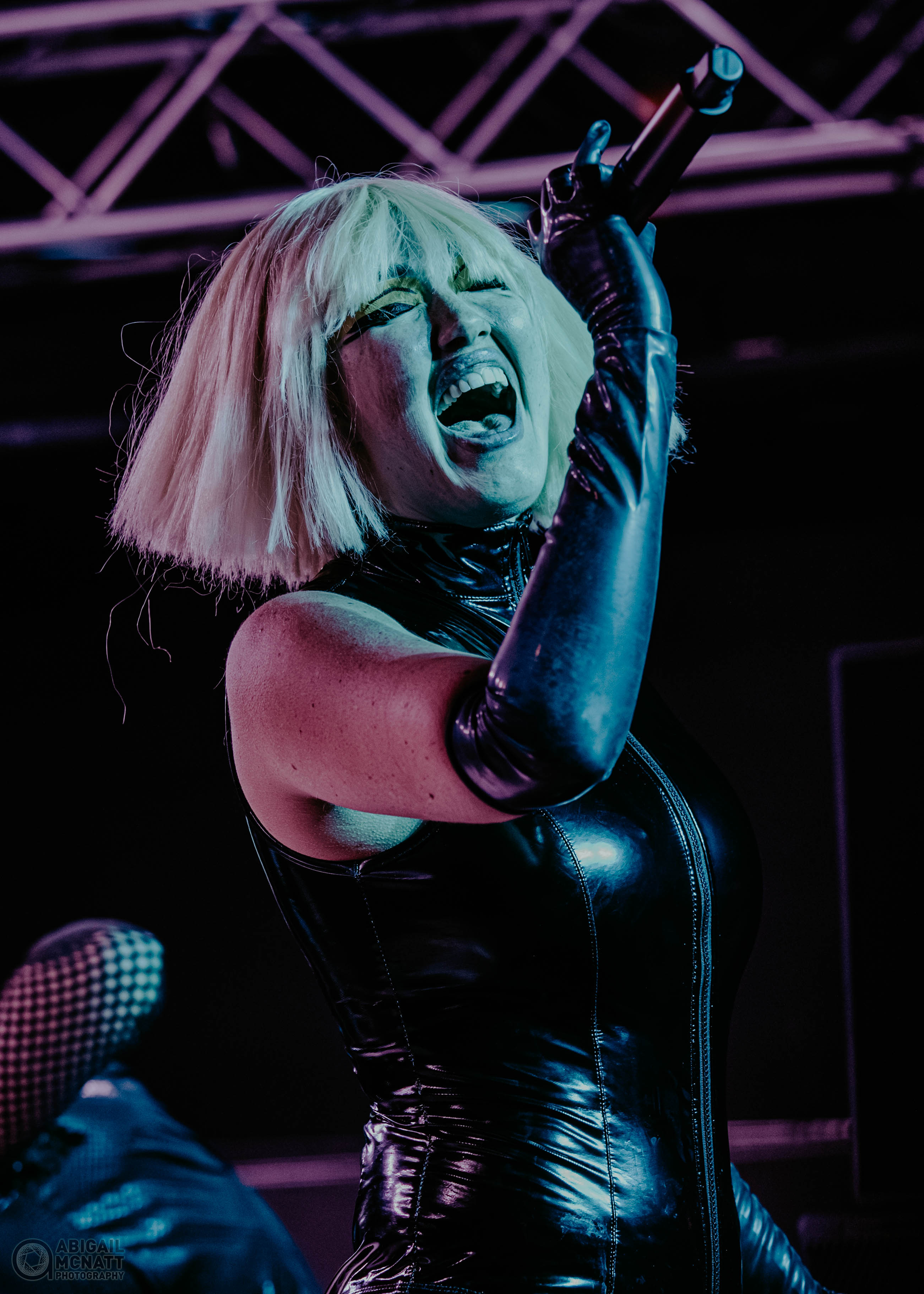
- Liesl in 2025

Background information
- Born: Jillian Liesl Saunders
- Origin: Palm Beach Gardens, FL
- Occupations: Singer; songwriter; model
- Website: julesliesl.com

Jules Liesl, is an American singer, songwriter and model.

== Personal life ==
Jules Liesl is originally from Palm Beach Gardens, and moved to Los Angeles to model in 2012. Throughout her modeling career, she developed an eating disorder, and sought a career change to music. She has synesthesia. Liesl is an advocate for the LGBTQ+ community.

== Career ==
Liesl was discovered by Noah Centineo's father Greg Centineo, after Jules's mom showed Greg a video of her singing. She told Genius that her biggest inspirations are Stacie Orrico, Christina Aguilera, Billie Eilish, and Sabrina Claudio. In December 2023, she performed at The Viper Room. She has worked with Richy Jackson for her music and visual projects.

In April 2025, she released her single "Cherry", and subsequently released remixes with Mark Picchioti, Birdee, Mousse T., James Hurr and Karsten Sollors. "Cherry" peaked at number 17 on the Billboard Dance/Mix Show Airplay chart.

In December 2025, she opened for Danity Kane on the Untold Chapter Tour.

== Discography ==
All credits are adapted from Spotify and Apple Music.

=== As lead artist ===
==== Singles ====
Year	Title	Album	Peak chart positions	Writer(s)	Producer(s)
Year	Title	Album	Dance/Mix Show Airplay	Writer(s)	Producer(s)
2026	“Want Me Like I Want U”	Metamorphosis	—	Jules Liesl, Drew Louis	Drew Louis, JoJo Centineo
2026	"Hot Hot Couture"	Metamorphosis	—	Jules Liesl, Drew Louis, Michelle Zarlenga	Drew Louis, JoJo Centineo
2026	“Dance or Die”	Metamorphosis	—	Jules Liesl, Drew Louis, Violet Skies, JoJo Centineo, Phoenix Stone, Sophie Zurawel	Drew Louis, JoJo Centineo, Phoenix Stone
2026	“Hit the Spot”	Metamorphosis	—	Jules Liesl, JoJo Centineo, Reysha Rami, Phoenix Stone, Charlotte Brutten, Dex Barstad, Drew Louis	Drew Louis, JoJo Centineo, Dex Barstad, Phoenix Stone
2025	"Cherry"	Non-album single	17	Jules Liesl, Charlotte Reed, Dex Barstad, JoJo Centineo, Reysha Rami, Drew Louis	JoJo Centineo, Phoenix Stone, Dextreau, Drew Louis

==== Extended plays ====
Title	Details
Metamorphosis	Scheduled: October 16, 2026; Label: Self-released; Format: Digital download, streaming; Track listing: 1. "Hit the Spot"; 2. "Dance or Die"; 3. "Hot Hot Couture"; 4. "Want Me Like I Want U"; 5. "Porcelain"; 6. "Metamorphosis"

=== Remixes ===
Year	Title
2025	"Cherry" (Mousse T. Slow Jam Remix)
2025	"Cherry" (James Hurr x Karsten Sollors Remix)
2025	"Cherry" (Mousse T. Remix)
2025	"Cherry" (Birdee Remix)
2025	"Cherry" (Mark Picchiotti Remix)

== Tours ==
=== Supporting act ===
- Danity Kane - Untold Chapter Tour (2025)
