= Shontelle Sparkles =

American drag queen

- Born: Shawn Berger Jr. Fort Myers, Florida
- Occupations: Drag queen; television personality; recording artist
- Awards: 31st National Entertainer of the Year

Shawn Berger Jr., known professionally as Shontelle Sparkles, is an American drag queen, television personality, and recording artist, and is the 31st National Entertainer of the Year. She is the drag mother of Jewels Sparkles, and co-host of the podcast I Live for This with her drag mother, Trinity the Tuck.

== Career ==
From 2019 to 2021, Sparkles did multiple makeup tutorials for Cosmopolitan's series Cosmo Queens, including a Mortal Kombat inspired look. In May 2022, she performed at the Grammy Museum alongside Trinity the Tuck and Rhea Litré. Two months later, she won the 31st annual National Entertainer of the Year award. In November 2023, Sparkles was named one of the Top 15 drag artists that should be on RuPaul's Drag Race by Pride.com.

In July 2024, Sparkles started the I Live for This podcast with Trinity the Tuck. In October 2024 she featured on the single "Six Six Sex" with members of her drag family, including Trinity the Tuck, Jewels Sparkles and Sam Star. In August 2025, she released her debut EP Butterfly Effect, co-written and produced by Drew Louis. Sparkles stated that her drag family encouraged her to make this project, including Trinity the Tuck, Sam Star, and Jewels Sparkles.

== Discography ==
All credits adapted from Spotify and Apple Music.

=== As lead artist ===
==== Singles ====
| Year | Title | Album | Writer(s) | Producer(s) |
|---|---|---|---|---|
| 2025 | "Beauty School Dropout" | Butterfly Effect | Drew Louis, Jayelle, Shawn Davis Berger | Drew Louis |

==== Extended plays ====
| Title | Details |
|---|---|
| Butterfly Effect | Released: August 29, 2025; Label: Self-released; Format: Digital download, streaming |

=== As featured artist ===
==== Singles ====
| Title | Year | Album |
|---|---|---|
| "See Me Now" (Allura The Doll with Shontelle Sparkles) | 2026 | Business & Pleasure |
| "Six Six Sex" (Trinity the Tuck featuring Jewels Sparkles, Sam Star, and Shontelle Sparkles) | 2024 | Sinematic (Deluxe) |
| “Run It” (Trinity the Tuck featuring Rhea Litré and Shontelle Sparkles) | 2022 | EGO |

== Filmography ==
=== Television ===
| Year | Title | Role | Notes |
|---|---|---|---|
| 2022 | Road to Royalty | Herself | National Entertainer of the Year documentary |
| 2017 | Shade: Queens of NYC | Herself | Fusion TV original |

=== Music videos ===
| Year | Title | Artist | Ref. |
|---|---|---|---|
| 2024 | "Six Six Sex" | Trinity the Tuck featuring Jewels Sparkles, Sam Star and Shontelle Sparkles | |

== Awards and nominations ==
| Year | Award giving body | Category | Results | Ref. |
|---|---|---|---|---|
| 2022 | National Entertainer of the Year | National Entertainer of the Year | Won | |
