= Ariel Bellvalaire =

American singer, songwriter and guitarist

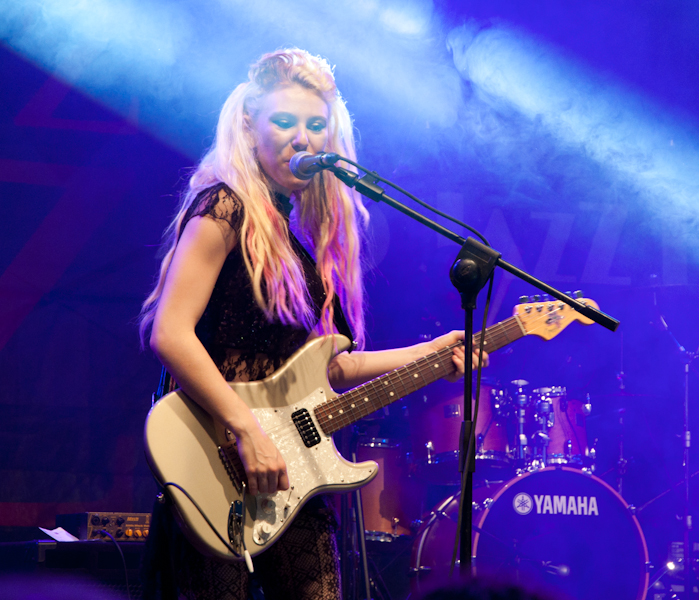

Background information
- Born: Ariel Melanie Weinstein
- Origin: Windsor, Connecticut
- Genres: Pop; rock
- Occupations: Singer; songwriter; guitarist
- Years active: 2014–present
- Website: arielbellvalaire.com

Ariel Melanie Weinstein, known professionally as Ariel Bellvalaire, is an American singer, songwriter, and guitarist originally from Windsor, Connecticut. She has played guitar with Debbie Gibson, and in the Los Angeles and off-broadway production of Drag: The Musical.

== Personal life ==
Ariel Bellvalaire grew up in Windsor, Connecticut, and attended Windsor High School. She now resides in Los Angeles.

== Career ==
In 2014, Bellvalaire performed alongside Lena Hall and Robin de Jesús in the Dearly Beloved Prince tribute show in New York City.

From 2022 to 2025, she played guitar in the house band for the Los Angeles, and the New York off-broadway run of Drag: The Musical. In Summer 2022, Bellvalaire met Debbie Gibson after a performance of Drag: The Musical, and subsequently played guitar with her on the Winterlicious holiday tour.

In March 2024 she released "Til the Clock Strikes" as the lead single for her debut album, Ariel. Wonderland praised the single, "[Til the Clock Strikes]'s vibrant energy and infectious hooks underscore Ariel’s talent not just as a singer, but also as a skilled lyricist and musician." In May 2024, she released single "Sharks in the Water".

In June 2025, she won the Best Pop award at the Hollywood Independent Music Awards.

== Discography ==
All song credits are adapted from Spotify and Apple Music.

=== As lead artist ===
==== Singles ====
| Title | Year | Album | Writer(s) | Producer(s) |
|---|---|---|---|---|
| "The Only Man I Never Hated" | 2024 | Ariel | Ariel Melanie Weinstein, Canita Rogers, Carlos Battey, Joel Michael Hellman | No producer credited |
| "Paranoid" | 2024 | Ariel | Ariel Melanie Weinstein | No producer credited |
| "Sharks in the Water" | 2024 | Ariel | Ariel Melanie Weinstein, Canita Rogers, Carlos Battey, Joel Michael Hellman | No producer credited |
| "Satellite" | 2024 | Ariel | Ariel Melanie Weinstein, Canita Rogers, Carlos Battey, Joel Michael Hellman | No producer credited |
| "Til the Clock Strikes" | 2024 | Ariel | Ariel Melanie Weinstein, Jayelle, Drew Louis | Drew Louis |
| "Monsters" | 2021 | Non-album singles | Ariel Bellvalalire, Kylie Hughes | Brett Boyett |
| "Diamonds or Coal" | 2021 | Non-album singles | Brett Boyett, Lindsey Scott, Raquel Warchol | No producer credited |
| "Elastic" | 2020 | Non-album singles | Ariel Melanie Weinstein, Brett Boyett, Scott Lindsey | Brett Boyett |

==== Albums ====
| Title | Details |
|---|---|
| Ariel | Released: 29 August 2025; Label: Self-released; Formats: Digital download; Track listing: 1. "Til the Clock Strikes"; 2. "Shoulda Known Better"; 3. "Escape Artist"; 4. "Sharks in the Water"; 5. "The Only Man I Never Hated; 6. "Satellite"; 7. "Paranoid"; 8. "Earthquake" |

== Awards and nominations ==
| Year | Award ceremony | Nominee(s)/work(s) | Category | Result | Ref. |
|---|---|---|---|---|---|
| 2025 | Hollywood Independent Music Awards | "Til the Clock Strikes" (Ariel Bellvalaire) | Pop | Won | |
