= Wanted (musical) =

Stage musical

- The Legend of the Sisters Clarke
- Broadway promotional poster
- Music: Ross Baum
- Lyrics: Angelica Chéri
- Book: Angelica Chéri
- Setting: Texas, 1893
- Basis: Mary and Martha Clarke
- Premiere: January 28, 2020: Signature Theatre, Arlington
- Productions: 2020 Arlington; 2024 Paper Mill Playhouse; 2026 Broadway

Wanted (originally titled Gun & Powder) is a 2020 musical based on the real story of Mary and Martha Clarke, two Black sisters who became outlaws in 1893. Developed by Angelica Chéri and Ross Baum, the musical began Broadway previews at the James Earl Jones Theatre on October 15, 2026, and officially opened on November 8, 2026.

== Plot ==
Mary and Martha Clarke are two African-American twin sisters living in Texas in 1893. In an effort to settle their mother's sharecropper debt and stop her from losing her home, the sisters pass as white and become outlaws.

== Principal casts ==
Character	Arlington	Paper Mill Playhouse	Broadway
Character	2020	2024	2026
Martha Clarke	Emmy Raver-Lampman	Liisi LaFontaine	Liisi LaFontaine
Mary Clarke	Solea Pfeiffer	Ciara Renée	Solea Pfeiffer
Tallulah Clarke	Marva Hicks	Jeannette Bayardelle	Ledisi
Elijah	Donald Webber Jr.	Aaron James McKenzie	Luke James
Jesse Whitewater	Dan Tracy	Hunter Parrish	Bradley Jaden
Flo	Awa Sal Secka	Zonya Love	Awa Sal Secka
Sissy	Yvette Monique Clark	Aurelia Williams	Aurelia Williams

== Musical numbers ==
=== Paper Mill Playhouse ===
Act I

- "Prologue" - Kinfolk
- "Cotton" – Tallulah, Mary, Martha, Kinfolk
- "Wide Open Plains" – Mary, Martha
- "Tallulah and Ole Betsy" - Tallulah
- "The Train" - Kinfolk
- "Just Passing Through" - Mary, Martha, Townspeople
- "Gun and Powder" - Kinfolk, Mary, Martha, Tallulah, Townspeople
- "Frenchman Father" - Fannie, Jessie, Ensemble
- "Dirty Shame" - Sissy, Flo
- "Dangerous" – Sissy, Flo
- "Invisible" – Elijah
- "Outlaw's Serenade" – Jesse
- "Lord, Have Mercy" - Kinfolk
- "Real Woman" – Mary
- "Tallulah's Letter" – Tallulah
- "Mama's Name" – Mary, Martha
- "Exactly His Type" - Kinfolk, Townspeople, Martha
- "The Way I Am" – Mary, Tallulah
- "Trigger" – Martha
- "Act One Finale" - Jesse, Mary, Martha, Elijah, Kinfolk, Townspeople

Act II

- "The Shot That Shook The Soul" - Company
- "Dirty Shame" - Sissy, Flo
- "Underneath" – Mary, Jesse
- "Under a Different Sun" – Martha, Elijah
- "Split" – Kinfolk
- "Martha's Curse" - Martha
- "Mary’s Nightmare" - Mary, Tallulah, Company
- "Freedom" - Martha
- "All of Me" – Mary, Martha, Tallulah, Company

=== Broadway ===
Act I

- "Prologue" - Kinfolk
- "Inheritance" – Mary, Martha, Tallulah, Kinfolk
- "Wide Open Plains" – Mary, Martha
- "The Train" - Kinfolk
- "Just Passing Through" - Mary, Martha, Townspeople
- "Gun & Powder" - Company
- "Frenchman Father" - Fannie, Tallulah, Company
- "Dangerous" – Sissy, Flo
- "Invisible" – Elijah
- "Outlaw's Serenade" – Jesse
- "Real Woman" – Mary
- "Tallulah's Letter" – Tallulah
- "Mama's Name" – Mary, Martha
- "The Way I Am" – Mary
- "Trigger" – Martha

Act II

- "The Shot That Shook The Soul" - Company
- "Sanctuary" – Mary, Jesse
- "Under a Different Sun" – Martha, Elijah
- "Enough" – Kinfolk
- "Martha's Curse" - Martha
- "Mary’s Nightmare" - Mary, Tallulah, Company
- "Freedom" - Martha, Kinfolk
- "All of Me" – Mary, Martha, Tallulah, Company

== Development ==
Wanted, originally titled Gun & Powder, was originally conceived in the NYU Graduate Musical Theatre Writing Program as the thesis of Angelica Chéri, who wrote the book and lyrics, and Ross Baum, who wrote the music. Chéri, who first proposed the story concept to Baum, is the great-great niece of Mary and Martha Clarke, and grew up hearing stories of the sisters as family folklore.

After its first workshop production in 2015, the writers decided to completely rewrite the entire show. It was the inaugural workshop production of New York University's Tisch Center for New Musicals. Gun & Powder was selected for the 2017 SigWorks Musical Theater Lab at the Signature Theatre in Arlington, Virginia, and was further developed in the 2018 NEXT Festival. That same year, it won the 2018 Richard Rogers Award and was selected for the NAMT Festival of New Musicals. Gun & Powder was further developed in residencies at Goodspeed Opera, Two River Theater and the Barnett Residency.

Gun & Powder made its sold-out world premiere at the Signature Theatre in February 2020 directed by Robert O'Hara. In Spring 2024, it had a run at the Paper Mill Playhouse in New Jersey, where it received generally positive reviews, including a New York Times Critic's Pick. The production was directed by Stevie Walker-Webb and choreographed by Tiffany Rea-Fisher.

In early 2025, it was announced that the show aimed to premiere on Broadway in 2026, rebranded as Wanted. A pre-Broadway workshop for the production was scheduled for June 2025. The Broadway production will feature Austin Cook as music director, Chelsey Arce as choreographer, and Stevie Walker-Webb as director.

In March 2026, it was announced that the show would open on Broadway on November 8, 2026 at the James Earl Jones Theatre, and that Liisi LaFontaine and Solea Pfeiffer would return to their original roles. On May 13, 2026, it was announced that Grammy winner Ledisi would be joining the Broadway company as Tallulah Clarke.
