= Trinity Ruins Christmas: The Musical =

2023 album by Trinity the Tuck

Studio album by Trinity the Tuck
- Released: November 17, 2023
- Label: PEG
- Producer: Drew Louis

Trinity the Tuck chronology
Ego (2022)	Trinity Ruins Christmas: The Musical (2023)	Sinematic (2024)

Trinity Ruins Christmas: The Musical is a holiday album by American drag performer Trinity the Tuck, released via the label Producer Entertainment Group on November 17, 2023. She released the album in conjunction with the book Trinity Ruins Christmas: The Chronicles of Sister Mary Kuntz, co-written by Jason Michael Snow, as well as a Christmas ornament. The book was inspired by A Christmas Carol and the Grinch, and illustrates the album's story arc. Among guests on the album are Trinity's fellow RuPaul's Drag Race contestants Alaska Thunderfuck, Ginger Minj, Jimbo, Manila Luzon, and Kylie Sonique Love.

== Composition ==
Trinity Ruins Christmas was inspired by Charles Dickens' 1843 novella A Christmas Carol and the Grinch. Trinity the Tuck has described the project as "a queer version" of A Christmas Carol. Drew Louis oversaw production and writing of the album, which features songs co-written by Louis, Jayelle, and Trinity the Tuck. Guests on the album include Trinity's fellow RuPaul's Drag Race contestants Alaska Thunderfuck, Ginger Minj, Jimbo, Manila Luzon, and Kylie Sonique Love, as well as Aria B Cassadine from the television series Queen of the Universe.

== Track listing ==
Trinity Ruins Christmas: The Musical
No.	Title	Writer(s)	Producer(s)	Length
1.	"It's in the Book" (featuring Alaska Thunderfuck)	Drew Louis	Louis	3:43
2.	"Trinity Ruins Christmas" (featuring Jimbo & Manila Luzon)	Louis; Jennifer Whitlock; Mark Byers; Ryan Taylor	Louis	3:30
3.	"A Curious Thing Happened"	Louis	Louis	1:07
4.	"Guilt's So Heavy" (featuring Ginger Minj)	Louis; Jayelle	Louis	3:05
5.	"The Clock Strikes One"	Louis	Louis	0:48
6.	"Light in the Dark" (featuring Aria B. Cassadine & Kylie Sonique Love)	Louis; Jayelle	Louis	3:43
7.	"A Massive Shadow"	Louis	Louis	0:46
8.	"You Just Need a Little Mary"	Louis	Louis	2:12
9.	"I'm Rich, But I'll Change"	Louis	Louis	2:01
10.	"Eternity to Me" (featuring Alaska Thunderfuck)	Louis; Jayelle	Louis	2:43
11.	"Good Enough" (featuring Alaska Thunderfuck, Aria B. Cassadine, Ginger Minj, Jimbo, Kylie Sonique Love, and Manila Luzon)	Louis; Jayelle	Louis	3:32
Total length:				27:14

== Personnel ==
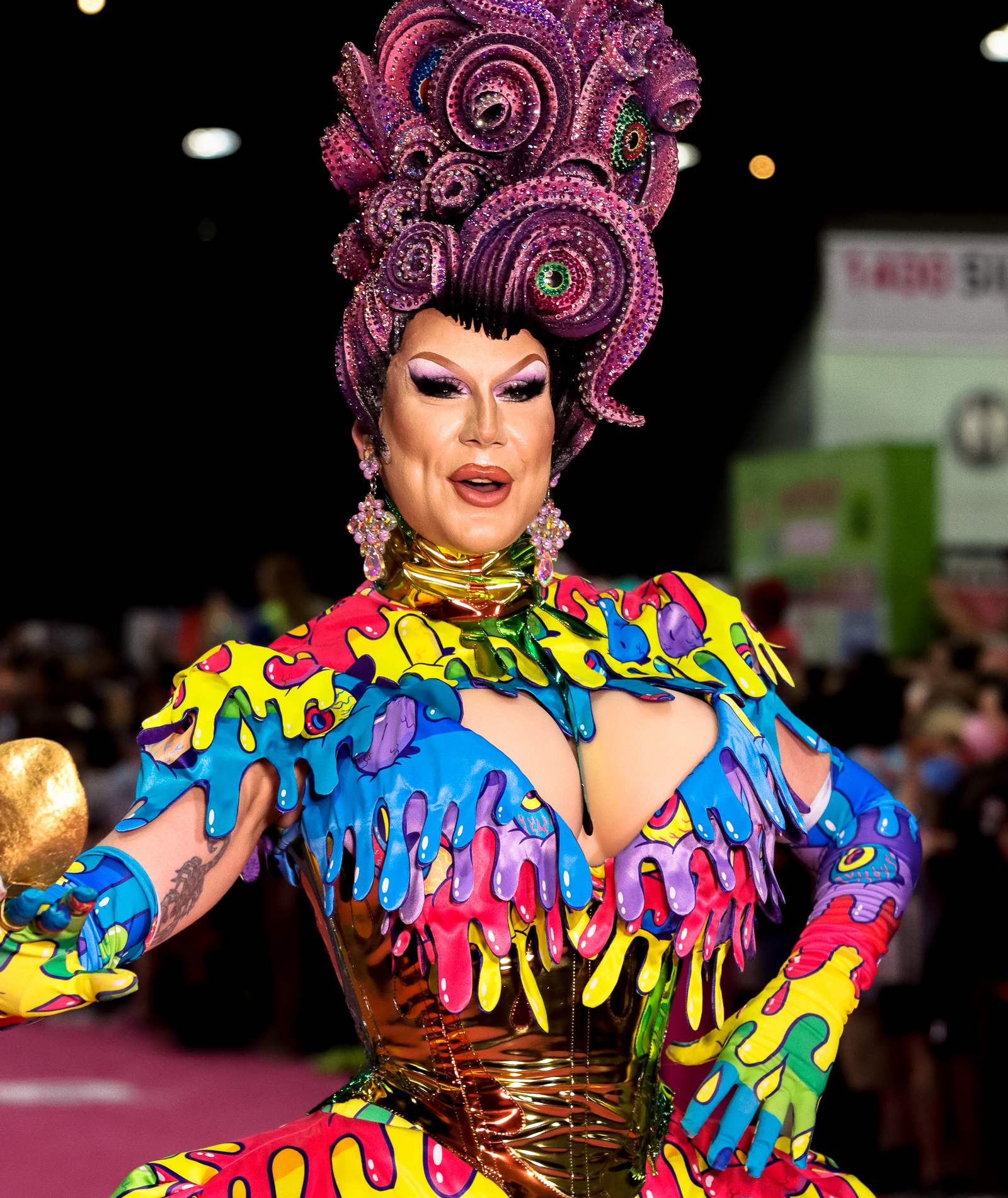
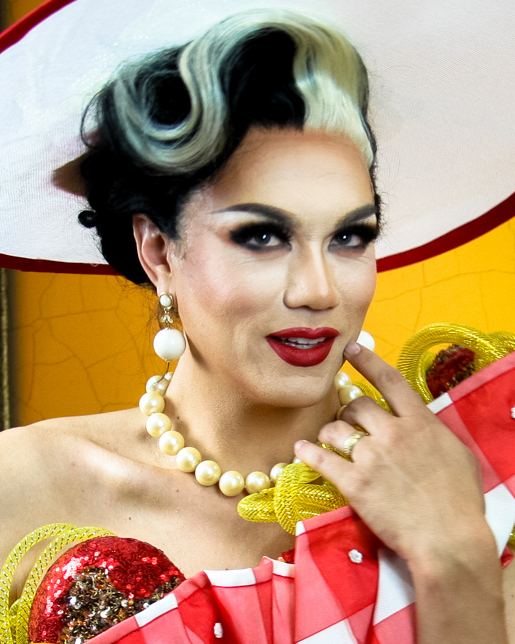
Jimbo (left) and Manila Luzon (right) are featured on the tracks "Trinity Ruins Christmas" and "Good Enough".
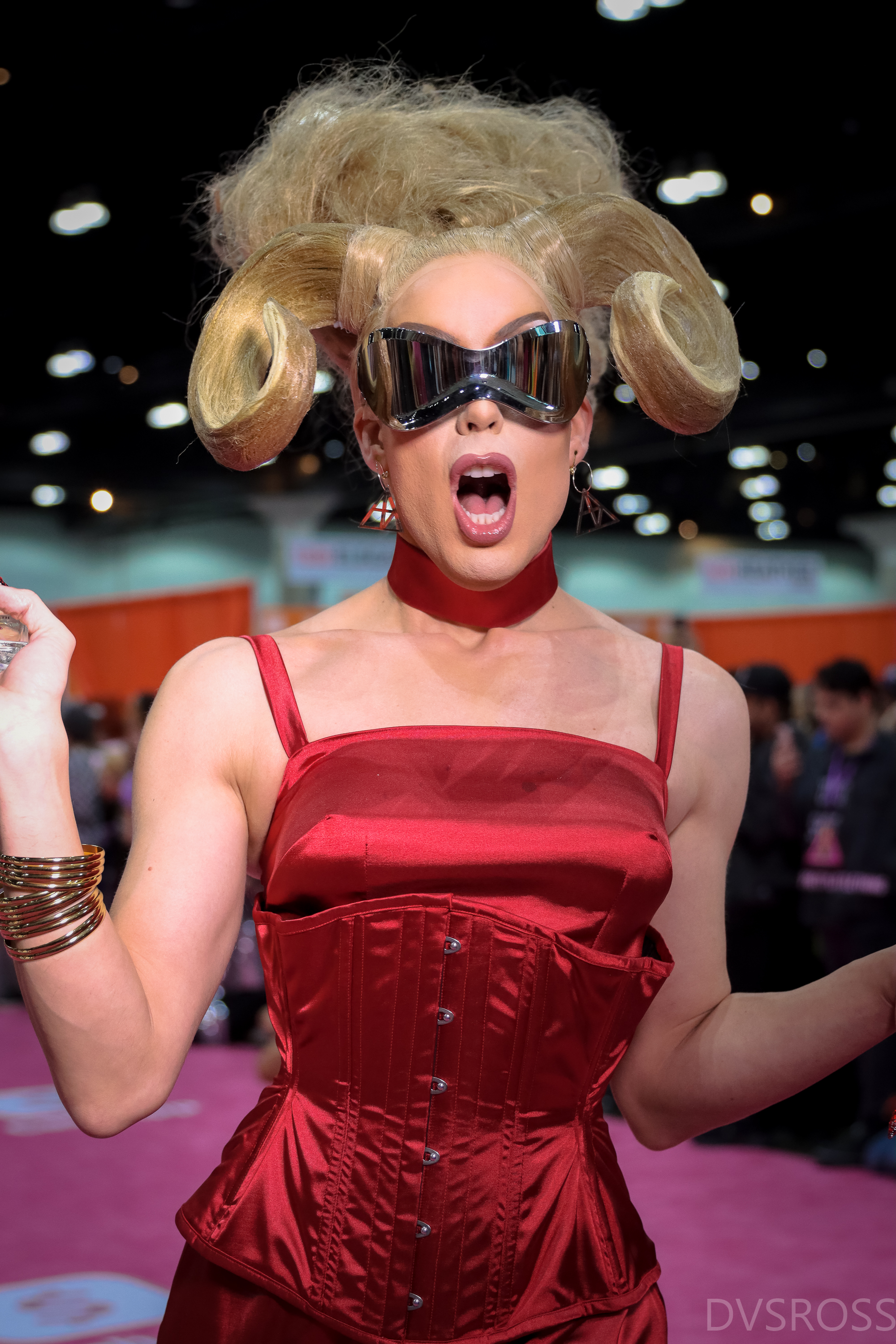
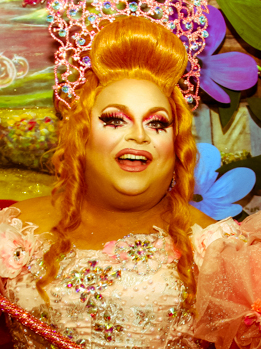
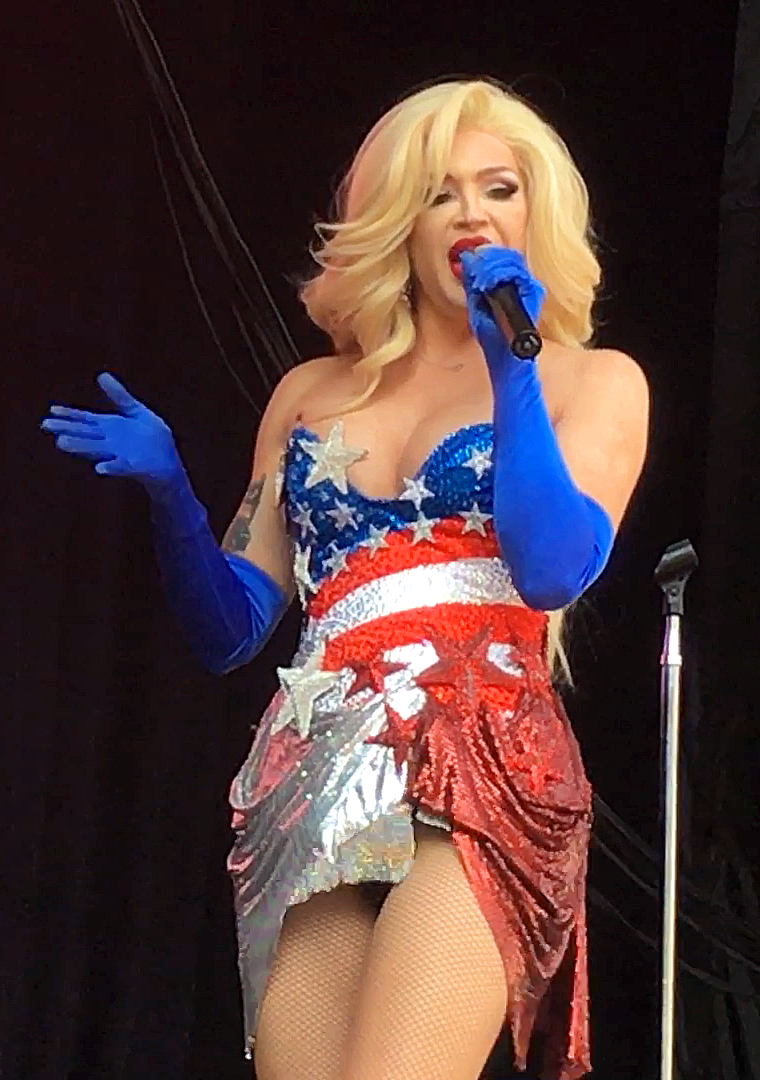
Alaska Thunderfuck (left), Ginger Minj (center), and Kylie Sonique Love (right) are also featured on the album.

Credits adapted from AllMusic

- Trinity the Tuck – primary artist
- Drew Louis – composer, producer
- Jayelle – composer
- Mark Byers – composer
- Ryan Taylor – composer
- Jennifer Whitlock – composer
- Alaska Thunderfuck – featured artist, vocals
- Aria Cassadine – featured artist, vocals
- Ginger Minj – featured artist, vocals
- Jimbo – featured artist, vocals
- Kylie Love – featured artist, vocals
- Manila Luzon – featured artist, vocals

== See also ==
- "Your Pilot's on Fire", RuPaul's Drag Race episode in which Trinity Taylor plays the character Sister Mary Kuntz
