= Sam Star =

American drag performer

- Born: Sam Purkey; January 24, 2000 (age 26); Leeds, Alabama, USA
- Television: RuPaul's Drag Race (season 17)
- Website: thesamstarstore.com

Sam Purkey (born January 24, 2000), known professionally as Sam Star, is an American drag performer. Star competed on Love for the Arts, the seventeenth season of RuPaul's Drag Race and the eleventh season of RuPaul's Drag Race All Stars.

== Career ==
Sam Star is an American drag performer. He has competed in pageantry, having been crowned Miss Glamorous Newcomer 2022. Her drag mother is three-time Drag Race alum Trinity the Tuck. He is additionally a retired gymnast and cheerleader.

Sam Star featured on Trinity the Tuck's single "Six Six Sex" alongside fellow Drag Race competitor Jewels Sparkles and Shontelle Sparkles. On the second episode of RuPaul's Drag Race Season 17, He performed her debut single "Say Yeehaw!", produced and co-written by Drew Louis. Her Instagram following grew by 865 percent as the show aired.

In April 2026, Star was announced to be competing on the eleventh season of RuPaul's Drag Race All Stars in the third bracket. He and Lucky Starzzz are the only representatives of season 17 on the cast.

== Personal life ==
Sam Star was born and raised in Leeds, Alabama and attended high school there. He is currently based in its suburb. Star attended the University of Alabama’s musical theatre program, but dropped out due to the cost of textbooks.

On episode six of RuPaul's Drag Race season 17, Star revealed that her godfather is former NBA player Charles Barkley. Barkley attended high school with Sam's mother and helped raise them.

== Filmography ==
=== Television ===
List of television credits, with selected details
Title	Year	Role	Notes	Ref.
Love for the Arts	2020	Contestant	6th place	
RuPaul's Drag Race	2025	Contestant	Finalist	
RuPaul's Drag Race All Stars	2026	Contestant	7th	

== Discography ==
All credits adapted from Apple Music and Spotify.

=== Singles ===
==== As lead artist ====
Year	Title	Album	Writer(s)	Producer(s)
2025	“Got It From Her” (featuring Trinity the Tuck)	Non-album singles	Drew Louis, Sam Star	Drew Louis
2025	"Say Yeehaw!"	Non-album singles	Drew Louis, Sam Star	Drew Louis

==== As featured artist ====
Year	Title	Artist(s)	Album	Writer(s)	Producer(s)
2024	"Six Six Sex" (featuring Jewels Sparkles, Sam Star, and Shontelle Sparkles)	Trinity the Tuck	Sinematic (Deluxe)	Drew Louis, Jayelle, Coen Hutton	Drew Louis
2025	"HAUS" (featuring Jewels Sparkles, Sam Star, and Allura The Doll)	Trinity the Tuck	Non-album single	Drew Louis, Ryan Taylor, Allura The Doll	Drew Louis
