= Liisi LaFontaine =

American singer and actress

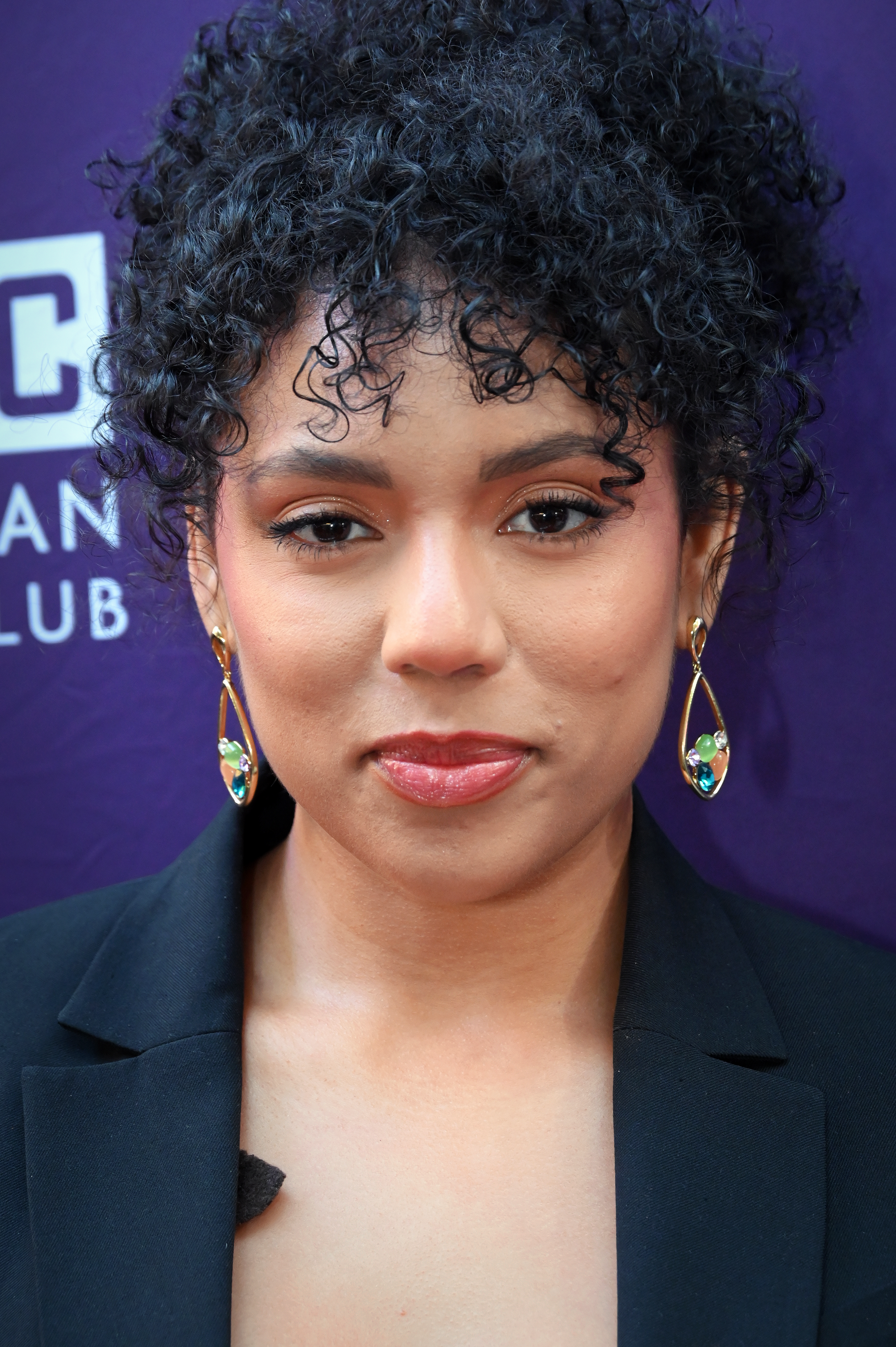
- LaFontaine in 2026
- Born: Elyse LaFontaine
- Education: Berklee College of Music (BM)
- Occupations: Actress; singer
- Years active: 2016–present

Elyse LaFontaine, known professionally as Liisi LaFontaine, is an American actress and singer. She is most known for her roles in the stage productions of Dreamgirls, and Moulin Rouge! The Musical on the West End.

== Education ==
Liisi LaFontaine attended Los Angeles County High School for the Arts, and then attended Berklee College of Music majoring in vocal performance.

== Career ==
LaFontaine got her first role on the West End in 2016 as Deena Jones in Dreamgirls. In 2021 she played Satine in Moulin Rouge! The Musical. In 2024, starred in the Off-Broadway production of Drag: The Musical as Dixie Coxworth. LaFontaine played Martha Clarke in the musical Wanted alongside Solea Pfeiffer, set to debut on Broadway in 2026.

== Acting credits ==
=== Theatre ===
Year	Title	Role	Notes
2016	Dreamgirls	Deena Jones	West End
2021	Moulin Rouge! The Musical	Satine	West End
2024	Gun & Powder	Martha Clarke	Paper Mill Playhouse
2024	Drag: The Musical	Dixie Coxworth	Off-Broadway, New World Stages
2026	Wanted	Martha Clarke	Broadway, James Earl Jones Theatre

=== Television ===
Year	Title	Role	Notes
2020	God Friended Me	Stacy	1 episode
2021	Good Trouble	Tanya	Recurring

== Discography ==
All credits adapted from Apple Music and Spotify.

=== As lead artist ===
==== Extended plays ====
Title	Details
Golden	Released: November 17, 2016; Label: Self-released; Format: Digital download, streaming; Track listing: 1. "Way That I Love U" (featuring P.J.); 2. "Champagne"; 3. "Love That I'm Feeling"; 4. "Same Sky"

=== As featured artist ===
==== Singles ====
Title	Year	Album
"Brightest Love" (Cupid's Daughters A Mythical Musical Cast, Brandon Victor Dixon and Liisi LaFontaine)	2023	Cupid's Daughters: A Mythical Musical
"Beautiful Day" (The Shapeshifters and Liisi LaFontaine)	2024	Non-album single
"Gun & Powder" (Wanted Studio Cast, Solea Pfeiffer, and Liisi LaFontaine)	2025	Wanted The Musical
“Virgo (Lists & Receipts)” (Retrograde The Musical featuring Liisi LaFontaine & Apocalypse Noir)	2025	Retrograde The Musical (Studio Cast Recording)
