= Dolce&Gabbana Beauty =

Italian perfume, cosmetics, and skin care brand

- Type: Subsidiary
- Industry: Cosmetics and fragrances
- Founded: February 2022
- Founder: Domenico Dolce, Stefano Gabbana
- Headquarters: Milan, Italy
- Key people: Alfonso Dolce (President), Gianluca Toniolo (CEO)
- Products: Fragrances, Makeup, Skin care
- Parent: Dolce & Gabbana

Dolce&Gabbana Beauty is the fragrance and cosmetics business of Dolce&Gabbana. It was established in February 2022 by designers Domenico Dolce and Stefano Gabbana to oversee product development, coordinate production with Italian manufacturers, and manage the marketing of perfumes, makeup, and skin-care lines.

Before 2022, the brand’s beauty products were made and distributed under license agreements with third-party companies. Alfonso Dolce serves as president, with Gianluca Toniolo as CEO.

Industry reporting in 2024 described the brand’s in-house management of beauty and an emphasis on Made-in-Italy manufacturing for new colour cosmetics and fragrances.

== History ==
Dolce&Gabbana launched its first perfumes, Dolce&Gabbana Pour Homme and Dolce&Gabbana Pour Femme, in 1992 in collaboration with the Italian company Euroitalia. The brand’s beauty lines were initially developed under license: first with Euroitalia (1992–2005), then with P&G Prestige (2005–2016). After Coty acquired P&G’s beauty portfolio, the Dolce&Gabbana agreement did not transition, and licensing moved to Shiseido in October 2016. Shiseido held full licensing rights until December 2021. From January 2022, Shiseido continued production while Dolce&Gabbana assumed R&D and communications; the fashion house took full operational control of its beauty business on 1 January 2023.

In 2022, Dolce&Gabbana established Dolce&Gabbana Beauty to oversee its beauty segment directly. While DG Beauty does not produce directly, it manages product development and coordinates manufacturing with external partners. Italian and industry press reported significant investment to support the in-house operation and manufacturing carried out in Italy by outside firms, such as ICR and Cosmint, and Intercos. The formation of DG Beauty created approximately 250 new jobs. The new venture is the first instance of an Italian fashion brand assuming direct management of its beauty category, according to industry sources.

In February 2023, DG Beauty launched two new perfumes, K and Q, described as referencing royal archetypes and combining citrus, woody, and fruity notes. In July of the same year, the company released the limited edition Light Blue Summer Vibes collection, featuring Light Blue Summer Vibes and Light Blue Summer Vibes Pour Homme fragrances, along with the Solar Glow Bare Skin Beautifier Universal Blurring Powder and the Solar Glow Lift & Set Universal Brow Gel. The launch of the Devotion perfume and makeup collection followed in September. The makeup collection includes the Everlift Luminizer, Everkiss Liquid Lipstick, Everfull XL Mascara.

In May 2024, DG Beauty updated their perfume lineup with K & Q Eaux de Parfum Intense. In August of that year, working with perfumer Emilie Copperman, the company launched Fefe, an alcohol-free fragrance mist for dogs. Later, in November, introduced the Lip Stylos makeup range.

In January 2025, Devotion For Men Eau de Parfum was released to complement its Devotion fragrance line. The following month, DG Beauty opened a dedicated beauty and accessories boutique in London’s Covent Garden. The company also launched a special Ramadan campaign featuring limited-edition versions of the Velvet Zafferano fragrance and scented candle, both centered on saffron and presented in packaging with golden arabesque designs. The Everink Liner and Everfull Hi-Definition Mascara were the next products to be introduced by the company in March of the same year. In April 2025, DG Beauty started selling a pre-makeup collection.

== Operations ==
Creative direction remains with Domenico Dolce and Stefano Gabbana. Alfonso Dolce is the company president, and Gianluca Toniolo, a former LVMH executive, is the chief executive. DG Beauty is headquartered in Milan, with subsidiary offices in Miami, Dubai, Singapore, Paris and Madrid. In 2024, Toniolo stated that the division employed more than 300 people and that the Light Blue franchise represented about 35% of sales; he also estimated the beauty business at approximately €1.5 billion in revenue, figures reported by business media.

== Collaborations, campaigns, and recognition ==
Notable earlier collaborations have included: Giuseppe Tornatore’s commercial for Sicily (2003); Martin Scorsese’s black-and-white campaign starring Scarlett Johansson and Matthew McConaughey for The One (2013); and films by Matteo Garrone for The One campaigns (2017).

In 2022, Brazilian singer Anitta appeared in a makeup campaign photographed by Mert & Marcus to mark the launch of Dolce&Gabbana Beauty’s official Instagram account, focusing on themes of inclusivity and individual expression. American singer Katy Perry starred in the campaign for the Devotion Eau de Parfum launched in October 2023. In 2024, supermodel Irina Shayk and model Jerry Hall starred in The Lunch, a short film directed by Steven Klein for the brand’s colour cosmetics campaign. In July of that year, DG beauty started a collaboration with Italian-Japanese makeup artist Naoko Scintu on the use of the brand's makeup collection. Jake Warden is also among the brand’s global makeup experts involved in educational content and campaign materials.

In January 2025, the company hired Korean star Mun Ka-Young as one of the brand's global ambassador. In June of that year, actor Theo James and model Vittoria Ceretti headlined the campaign celebrating the 25th anniversary of Light Blue fragrance, which paid homage to the original 2007 advertisements through imagery set in Capri.

Dolce & Gabbana Pour Femme received the Perfume Academy’s 1993 award for best feminine fragrance of the year, while Dolce & Gabbana Pour Homme was awarded best masculine fragrance of the year in 1995.

== Products ==
The following is an incomplete list of perfumes marketed under the Dolce&Gabbana brand:

- Dolce & Gabbana Classic for women (1994)
- Dolce & Gabbana Classique for men (1994)
- By Man (1997)
- By Woman (1999)
- D & G Masculine (1999)
- D & G Feminine(1999)
- Light Blue for women (2001)
- SICILY for women (2003)
- The One for women (2006)
- Light Blue pour Homme for men (2007)
- L'Eau The One for women (2008)
- The One for Men for men (2008)
- Rose the One for women (2009)
- DOLCE for women (2014)
- INTENSO for men (2014)
- K for men (2019)
- Devotion for women (2023)
