= Lorna Courtney =

American actress

- Courtney in 2026
- Born: October 12, 1998 (age 28); New York City, U.S.
- Education: University of Michigan (BFA)
- Occupations: Actress, singer
- Years active: 2019–present

Lorna Annetta Courtney (born October 12, 1998) is an American stage actress. She is best known for playing the title role of Juliet on Broadway in the musical & Juliet, for which she was nominated for a Tony Award for Best Actress in a Musical.

== Early life and education ==
Courtney grew up in the South Ozone Park neighborhood of Queens, New York. Courtney began singing at an early age, performing in gospel choirs as a way to overcome her shyness.

Courtney attended LaGuardia High School, a public high school specializing in the performing arts, where she studied opera. She obtained a Bachelor of Fine Arts from the University of Michigan, where she majored in musical theatre. She graduated in three years by completing additional summer courses at Washtenaw Community College, and worked at a youth center near the university.

== Career ==
After graduating from the University of Michigan, Courtney made her Broadway debut in the Pasek and Paul musical Dear Evan Hansen. She joined the cast in May 2019 as an understudy for the lead roles of Alana Beck and Zoe Murphy. Lorna was then cast in West Side Story in the role of Rosalia and as the understudy for Maria. She performed in the show until theaters were mandated to shut down by Governor Andrew Cuomo on March 12, 2020, due to the COVID-19 pandemic.

In May 2022, Courtney was cast in her first professional leading role as Juliet in the North American premiere of & Juliet (a jukebox reimagining of the Shakespeare play featuring pop songs by Max Martin in which Juliet does not die). The musical played a pre-Broadway engagement at the Princess of Wales Theatre in Toronto, Ontario, between June 22 and August 14, 2022. Courtney debuted the role on Broadway when the show transferred to the Stephen Sondheim Theatre on November 17, 2022. She received critical acclaim; The New York Times theater critic Jesse Green noted Courtney's "blow-you-away performance". As part of the original Broadway cast recording, Courtney recorded a duet of "Since U Been Gone" with the song's original recording artist Kelly Clarkson. At the 76th Tony Awards, she was nominated for Best Actress in a Musical for & Juliet.

In May 2025, it was announced that Courtney would be playing Veronica Sawyer in the Off-Broadway revival of Heathers: The Musical at New World Stages for a limited summer run from June until September. It was extended and she performed until December 2025. Courtney made her international debut in the world premiere production of The Greatest Showman: The Musical as Anne Wheeler at the Bristol Hippodrome from March 2026. In July 2026, it was announced that Courtney would be taking over the role of Janet Weiss, played by actress Stephanie Hsu, in the current Broadway production of The Rocky Horror Show at Studio 54. She started performances August 25th, 2026.

== Stage credits ==
Year(s)	Production	Role	Location	Category	Ref.
2014	We Are!		Mama Foundation for the Arts	Regional	
2014	Mama I Want to Sing	Lena	Japan tour	International Revival	
2019–2020	Dear Evan Hansen	u/s Alana Beck, Zoe Murphy	Music Box Theatre	Broadway	
2020	West Side Story	Rosalia, u/s Maria	Broadway Theatre	Broadway	
2022	& Juliet	Juliet Capulet	Princess of Wales Theatre	Pre-Broadway engagement: Toronto, Ontario	
2022–2024	& Juliet	Juliet Capulet	Stephen Sondheim Theatre	Broadway	
2025-2026	Heathers: The Musical	Veronica Sawyer	New World Stages	Off-Broadway	
2026	The Greatest Showman	Anne Wheeler	Bristol Hippodrome	International Premiere	
2026	The Rocky Horror Show	Janet Weiss	Studio 54	Broadway	

== Acting credits ==
=== Television ===
Year(s)	Title	Role	Notes
2021	The Equalizer	Jewel Machado	Episode: "Pilot"
2026	9-1-1 Nashville	Judy	Episode: "Going Rogue"

== Discography ==
All credits adapted from Apple Music and Spotify.

=== As featured artist ===
==== Singles ====
Title	Year	Album
"Closure" (Vanguard Development Project with Lex Banton and Lorna Courtney)	2015	EP III
"...Baby One More Time" (Original Broadway Cast of & Juliet and Lorna Courtney)	2022	& Juliet (Original Broadway Cast Recording)
"Roar" (Original Broadway Cast of & Juliet and Lorna Courtney)	2022	& Juliet (Original Broadway Cast Recording)
"Do You Remember" (Daniel Mertzlufft, Jacob Ryan Smith, Devin Lewis and Lorna Courtney)	2024	Non-album singles
"Elevate" (Ramencoke and Lorna Courtney)	2025	Non-album singles
"Mountain in the Sky" (Jaime Lozano, The Familia and Lorna Courtney)	2025	Non-album singles
“Sagittarius (Shoot Your Shot)” (Retrograde The Musical featuring Lorna Courtney)	2025	Retrograde The Musical (Studio Cast Recording)

Cast Recordings & Soundtracks

- & Juliet - Original Broadway Cast Recording (2022)

== Awards and nominations ==
List of awards and nominations
Year	Work	Award	Category	Result	Ref.
2022	& Juliet	Dora Award	Outstanding Performance in a Leading Role	Nominated	
2023	& Juliet	Tony Awards	Best Actress in a Leading Role in a Musical	Nominated	
2023	& Juliet	Drama League Awards	Distinguished Performance	Nominated	
2023	& Juliet	Clive Barnes Awards	Theatre Artist Award	Won	
2023	& Juliet	BroadwayWorld Awards	Best Lead Performer in a Musical	Won	
