= Bijou (DJ) =

American record producer and DJ (born 1990)

BIJOU
- Born: Benjamin Dorman; April 25, 1990 (age 36)
- Origin: Tempe, Arizona
- Genres: Ghetto house; house; EDM
- Occupations: Record producer; DJ
- Years active: 2014–present
- Website: www.bijou-music.com

Benjamin Dorman (born 25 April 1990), known professionally as BIJOU, is an American record producer and DJ. Bijou produces ghetto house music, and is an Insomniac artist.

== Personal life ==
Bijou grew up in Tempe, Arizona, attending Marcos de Niza High School, and subsequently attended Northwestern Oklahoma State, and Missouri State University. He used to be an avid baseball player. He first started liking dance music after hearing Tiësto’s “Adagio For Strings” in 2009. His brother is retired Olympian diver, Sam Dorman.

In 2021, The Sun leaked photos of Bijou and Sarah Trott from The Bachelor on a boat in Mexico. Trott claims her and Bijou never had a relationship beyond a friendship.

Bijou enjoys watching American football, and is a fan of the Buffalo Bills of the National Football League (NFL).

== Career ==
Bijou produces ghetto house music, and is an Insomniac artist. His 2016 single "Hello" with Dr. Fresch garnered in acclaim from Don Diablo, Party Favor, and Wax Motif. In June 2019, he played the StereoBLOOM stage at EDC in Las Vegas. In 2020, he won "Best DJ" in the Best of Phoenix guide. In June 2020, he collaborated with Party Favor with their single "Whoa". He released "Six Shots" at the end of 2022. In September 2023, Bijou opened for Big Gigantic at Red Rocks Amphitheatre in Colorado. In January 2024, he released his single "Chit Chat", and EDM.com praised its "...expertly curated samples and winding synths." In October 2024, he released "Seduction" under his own label imprint Do Not Duplicate Recordings.

== Discography ==
All credits are adapted from the Apple Music and Spotify.

=== As lead artist ===
==== Singles ====
Year	Title	Album
2024	"Put It Down" (with Jayelle)	Non-album singles
2024	"Runway" (with Haylee Wood)	Non-album singles
2024	"Seduction" (with Jenny Voss)	Non-album singles
2024	"Pieces of Me" (with 7KY)	Non-album singles
2024	"Swagger Feet" (with Brandon)	Non-album singles
2024	"The Power" (with Marten Hørger)	Non-album singles
2024	"Intoxicated" (with No Thanks)	Non-album singles
2024	"Oxygen" (with Alltalk)	Non-album singles
2024	"Firestarter" (with Corrupt UK & Julia Temos)	Lights Out
2024	"Mobbing" (with Dr. Fresch, Big Tone & A-Wax)	Lights Out
2024	"Chit Chat" (with No/Me)	Lights Out
2023	"One More Time" (with Chacel)	Non-album singles
2023	"Overdrive" (with Bekah & 3verynight)	Non-album singles
2023	"2 Step"	Non-album singles
2023	"Goons" (with Drezo)	Non-album singles
2023	"Hit Like (Bijou Remix)" (with The Funk Hunters, Eskei83, & Rusur)	Non-album singles
2023	"Daybreak" (with Honey & Badger)	Non-album singles
2023	"Beyond To Infinity" (with Purple Velvet Curtains)	Non-album singles
2023	"The Way We Touch" (with Mahalo)	Non-album singles
2023	"MoneyBag" (featuring Emida)	Non-album singles
2023	"Back It Up" (featuring Young Lyxx & Michael Sparks)	Non-album singles
2023	"Saint Tropez" (with Zaerd)	Non-album singles
2022	"Six Shots"	Non-album singles
2022	"Rude Boy" (with Pajane)	Non-album singles
2022	"Gang Gang"	Non-album singles
2022	"I Know" (with Marten Hørger)	Non-album singles
2022	"Pop It"	Non-album singles
2022	"Act Up"	Non-album singles
2022	"The Players Anthem" (with Benny The Butcher)	Non-album singles
2022	"100Gang" (with Eva Shaw & Hitmakerchinx)	Non-album singles
2021	"Bust It" (with Nostalgix)	Non-album singles
2021	"Code Blue" (with Elcamino)	Street Knowledge
2021	"Rockstar" (with Tony Watts)	Street Knowledge
2021	"Curses" (with Rick Hyde)	Street Knowledge
2021	"Stylin" (featuring Dread MC & Masteria)	Non-album singles
2021	"Big Dog" (with Dr. Fresch & Chase Fetti)	Non-album singles
2021	"Your Love (Bijou Remix)" (with Two Can)	Non-album singles
2021	"Lost" (with Lucille Croft & Marco XO)	Non-album singles
2021	"Poison" (with Snbrn & CeCe Rogers)	Non-album singles
2021	"Insane (Bijou Remix)" (with Apashe & Tech N9ne)	Non-album singles
2020	"One Life (HeyMcFly! Remix)" (with Kaleena Zanders & HeyMcFly!)	Non-album singles
2020	"Sushi" (with Damon Sharpe & Dvrko)	Non-album singles
2020	"Chop It Up" (with Splashwoe)	Non-album singles
2020	"Woah (Jack Beats Remix)" (with Party Favor & Jack Beats)	Non-album singles
2020	"New Ways To Love (Snbrn Remix)" (with Bekah & Snbrn)	Non-album singles
2020	"Black Suede" (with Cheyenne Giles)	Non-album singles
2020	"My Woes" (with Splashwoe)	Diamond City
2020	"Keep It Movin'" (with Marco XO)	Diamond City
2020	"Willful" (with Jacknife & Chetta)	Diamond City
2020	"Fantasy" (with Vannah & DLMT)	Diamond City
2020	"Whoa" (with Party Favor)	Diamond City
2020	"One Life" (with Kaleena Zanders)	Non-album single
2020	"Westside" (with Dr. Fresch & Willy Northpole)	Diamond City
2020	"Baller" (with Cuban Doll)	Diamond City
2020	"Benjamins" (with Wifisfuneral)	Diamond City
2019	"Get Back" (with Dr. Fresch)	Non-album singles
2019	"Crown" (with Tyler Graves)	Non-album singles
2019	"Flex" (with Angelz & Chetta)	Non-album singles
2019	"Touch Me"	Non-album singles
2019	"Floetry" (with Ro Ransom)	Non-album singles
2019	"100 Bags" (with Chetta)	Non-album singles
2019	"Lose Control" (with Marco XO)	Non-album singles
2019	"Your Love"	Non-album singles
2019	"House Party" (with Schade)	Non-album singles
2019	"Memories"	Non-album singles
2019	"Smack"	Non-album singles
2018	"Run It Back" (with Aviva)	Non-album singles
2018	"Super Phat" (with Ushi Qute)	Super Phat
2018	"Young & Reckless" (featuring Way)	Non-album singles
2018	"Don't Forget Us" (with Judge)	Non-album singles
2018	"Pringles" (with Davonyea Marcel)	Non-album singles
2018	"Dreams"	Dreams
2018	"Revelation" (with Dr. Fresch & Denzel Curry)	Non-album singles
2018	"Gotta Shine" (featuring Germ)	Non-album singles
2018	"Count On Me" (with Evan Allen & Kaleena Zanders)	Non-album singles
2017	"Assassin"	Non-album singles
2017	"Warning"	Non-album singles
2017	"G-Code"	G-Code
2017	"Dip" (with Joel Fletcher)	Non-album singles
2017	"The Clique" (with GreyArea)	Non-album singles
2017	"Famous" (with Matroda)	Non-album singles
2017	"Covered N Money"	Non-album singles
2017	"Snake Charmer"	Non-album singles
2017	"We Runnin It" (with Gerry Gonza)	Non-album singles
2017	"Jack Some" (with Dirty Doses)	Non-album singles
2017	"Twerk It Out" (with Gerry Gonza)	Non-album singles
2017	"Bass Rock" (with Daas)	Non-album singles
2017	"Menace"	Non-album singles
2017	"Lockdown"	Non-album singles
2016	"Guru"	Non-album singles
2016	"Drop Top"	Non-album singles
2016	"I'm A Dog"	Non-album singles
2016	"I Need A Breakbeat"	We Don't Stop
2016	"Pump That" (with Juany Bravo)	We Don't Stop
2016	"We Don't Stop"	We Don't Stop
2015	"Phoenix" (with Gerry Gonza)	The People Beat
2015	"Watch Me" (with Gerry Gonza)	The People Beat
2014	"Ball Out" (with Thee Cool Cats)	Non-album single

==== Extended plays ====
Title	Details
Street Knowledge	Released: September 17, 2021; Label: Do Not Duplicate Recordings; Format: Digital download, streaming; Track listing: 1. "Street Knowledge"; 2. "Curses (with Rick Hyde)"; 3. "Rockstar (with Tony Watts)"; 4. "Code Blue (with Elcamino)"; 5. "Hit Boys (with Young World)"; 6. "Quick Draw (with Chase Fetti)"
187 Proof	Released: March 19, 2021; Label: Night Bass Records; Format: Digital download, streaming; Track listing: 1. "Big Racks (with Elcamino)"; 2. "Zodiac (with J. Sirus)"; 3. "Liquid Swords"
Gangsta Party	Released: January 25, 2019; Label: Do Not Duplicate Recordings; Format: Digital download, streaming; Track listing: 1. "Kung Fu (with Dr. Fresch)"; 2. "Too Cocky (with Dr. Fresch)"
Super Phat	Released: September 14, 2018; Label: Night Bass Records; Format: Digital download, streaming; Track listing: 1. "Super Phat (with Ushi Qute)"; 2. "Do Not Disturb"; 3. "Expert (with Blossom)"; 4. "Better Than That (with Atlast)"
Luxury Code	Released: June 19, 2018; Label: Homerun House; Format: Digital download, streaming; Track listing: 1. "The Way It Is (with Gerry Gonza)"; 2. "Take A Hit (with Gerry Gonza)"; 3. "The Walk (with Gerry Gonza)"; 4. "Work The Pole (with Gerry Gonza)"
Dreams	Released: March 9, 2018; Label: Homerun House; Format: Digital download, streaming; Track listing: 1. "Dreams"; 2. "Codeine Dreams"
G-Code	Released: September 15, 2017; Label: Night Bass Records; Format: Digital download, streaming; Track listing: 1. "G-Gode"; 2. "1000 Bitches"; 3. "Get Up (with Torren Foot)"; 4. "Afterparty (with Blak Trash)"
We Don't Stop	Released: January 8, 2016; Label: Audiophile XXL; Format: Digital download, streaming; Track listing: 1. "We Don't Stop"; 2. "Pump That (with Juany Bravo)"; 3. "I Need A Breakbeat"
The People Beat	Released: November 9, 2015; Label: HOH Music Group; Format: Digital download, streaming; Track listing: 1. "Watch Me (with Gerry Gonza)"; 2. "Phoenix (with Gerry Gonza)"

==== Studio albums ====
Title	Details
Lights Out	Released: March 15, 2024; Label: Final Press; Format: Digital download, streaming; Track listing: 1. "Lights Out Intro"; 2. "Chit Chat (with No/Me)"; 3. "G House Forever (Ryan Collins Interlude)"; 4. "Mercy (with AK Renny)"; 5. "Loyalty (Tommy Hands Interlude)"; 6. "Mobbing (with Dr Fresch, Big Tone, & A-Wax)"; 7. "The Realest (Dr. Fresch Interlude)"; 8. "Firestarter (with Julia Temos & Corrupt UK)"; 9. "London Bells (Kaleena Zanders Interlude)"; 10. "Slow Motion (with Gold Lemonade)"; 11. "Bills Mafia (AC Slater Interlude)"; 12. "All Over Me (with KLP)"; 13. "Overdue (Burman Interlude)"
Diamond City	Released: July 31, 2020; Label: Do Not Duplicate Recordings; Format: Digital download, streaming; Track listing: 1. "Benjamins (with Wifisfuneral)"; 2. "Whoa (with Party Favor)"; 3. "FTP (with Denzel Curry)"; 4. "Westside (with Dr. Fresch & Willy Northpole)"; 5. "Willful (with Jacknife & Chetta)"; 6. "Fantasy (with Vannah & DLMT)"; 7. "My Woes (with Splashwoe)"; 8. "Keep It Movin' (with Marco XO)"; 9. "New Ways To Love (with Bekah)"; 10. "Crown (with Tyler Graves)"; 11. "Laid Back (with Black Smurf)"; 12. "Swag (with Blk Llama)"; 13. "Throw It Up"; 14. "G-Gode Pt. 2"
