= Break Up (Bye Bye) =

Song by Frock Destroyers

from the album Frock4Life
- Released: 31 October 2019
- Genre: Pop
- Length: 2:31
- Label: World of Wonder
- Songwriters: Freddy Scott, Leland; Baga Chipz; Blu Hydrangea; Divina de Campo
- Producers: Freddy Scott, Leland

"Break Up (Bye Bye)" is a song recorded by British drag girl group the Frock Destroyers for the Girl Group Battle Royale challenge during their stint on the first series of the reality television competition, RuPaul's Drag Race UK. During the episode the contestants had to create girl groups to participate in the challenge; there were two versions of the song released, the first being by Divina de Campo, Baga Chipz and Blu Hydrangea. The alternate version was released by Filth Harmony, consisting of Drag Race UK winner The Vivienne, Cheryl Hole and Crystal, however the latter did not chart. The song was released on 31 October 2019. The song was also included in the band's debut album, Frock4Life, which was released 11 December 2020. The song was primarily written by Leland and Freddy Scott with De Campo, Chipz and Hydrangea writing the lyrics for their individual verses.

Upon the release, the song proved an instant hit with the British viewers, charting at number 35 on the Official UK Charts, becoming the highest charting song by a drag queen, since RuPaul's "Supermodel (You Better Work)", until the following year when United Kingdolls released "UK Hun?" which charted at number 27.

== Background, composition and reception ==
"Break Up Bye Bye" was originally performed by the Frock Destroyers during a girl group challenge on Drag Race, in which contestants were required to write and perform an original song. Lyrically, Baga Chipz alludes to anal sex in the song, which was written by Leland and Freddy Scott. MNEK served as a guest vocal coach during the girl group episode, with him also being credited as a producer. The pop anthem sees Divina de Campo sing "repeated whistle tone notes layered into the chorus".

== Live performances ==
Following Drag Race, the Frock Destroyers embarked on a three-stop UK tour. Shows featuring individual and group performances were held at Powerhouse in Newcastle upon Tyne, Cruz 101 in Manchester and the Nightingale Club in Birmingham, during 17–19 November 2019. For Digital DragCon, an online event replacing RuPaul's DragCon LA in May 2020 because of the COVID-19 pandemic, Blu Hydrangea recreated the trio's performance of "Break Up Bye Bye" in isolation by impersonating Baga Chipz and Divina de Campo. Daniel Megarry of Gay Times complimented her work.

== Track listing ==
Digital download and streaming

- "Break Up (Bye Bye)" – 2:31
- "Break Up (Bye Bye)" (Much Betta remix) – 3:36
- "Break Up (Bye Bye)" (Rock remix) – 2:52

Vinyl

1. "Break Up (Bye Bye)"
2. "Break Up (Bye Bye)" (Much Betta remix)
3. "Break Up (Bye Bye)" (Markaholic remix)
4. "Break Up (Bye Bye)" (Freddy Scott remix)

== Chart performance ==
After the girl group episode of Drag Race aired, "Break Up Bye Bye" peaked at number 35 on the UK Singles Chart and number 10 on The Official Big Top 40, becoming the highest chart position for a drag group. The song also prompted a petition for the Frock Destroyers to represent the United Kingdom in the Eurovision Song Contest to garner at least 10,000 signatures, while it peaked at number 44 on the Billboard Hot Dance/Electronic Songs chart in the United States.

== See also ==
- Girl groups in the Drag Race franchise
