= UK Hun? =

2021 song by United Kingdolls

Song by United Kingdolls
- Released: 11 February 2021
- Genre: Pop
- Length: 2:46
- Label: World of Wonder
- Songwriters: Leland; Lawrence Chaney; Bimini Bon-Boulash; A'Whora; Tayce
- Producer: MNEK

"UK Hun?" is a song recorded by British drag girl group United Kingdolls for The RuRuvision Song Contest challenge during their stint on the second series of reality television competition, RuPaul's Drag Race UK. The episode has contestants participate in a Eurovision-style performance. The song was released on February 11, 2021. It was primarily written by Leland, with Lawrence Chaney, Bimini Bon-Boulash, A'Whora and Tayce writing the lyrics for their individual verses.

Two versions of the song were released, with a second being released by Bananadrama, consisting of: Joe Black, Tia Kofi, Sister Sister and Ellie Diamond. This version did not chart. Upon the success of the United Kingdolls version, two members of the group: Tayce and Bimini have begun their solo recording careers, with the latter being the first drag queen from any Drag Race franchise to sign a major mainstream record deal, signing a joint deal with Relentless Records and Sony Music in July 2022.

== Background, recording and reception ==
"UK Hun?" was the chosen song for the episode, written by Leland and Freddy Scott. Chaney and Black were team captains and each group had to write and record their own versions of the song. MNEK was the vocal coach for each group. On the main stage, the judges watch the performances of both groups. The contestants performed a mixture of sung and rapped vocals. RuPaul announced the United Kingdolls as victorious, thus all members receiving a RuPeter badge. The song was alluded to in the second episode of the second season of Canada's Drag Race, with the "Under the Big Top" Rusical featuring a trio of clowns named Bing, Bang and Bong. Bimini's verse in "UK Hun?" was nominated for a BAFTA TV Award in 2022 in the category of "Must-See Moment".

== Chart performance ==
It was revealed during the midweek chart the "UK Hun?" was due to reach number 25 on the Official UK Charts, however it charted at number 27. On 19 February 2021, it was announced the United Kingdolls had charted at number 27 on the Official UK Charts, beating previous Drag Race UK band, Frock Destroyers, who reached number 35, but also beat RuPaul, whose single "Supermodel (You Better Work)" charted at number 39.

== Frock Destroyers version ==
"UK Hun?"

Single by Frock Destroyers featuring Lawrence Chaney
- Released: 6 April 2021
- Genre: Pop
- Length: 2:46
- Label: World of Wonder
- Songwriters: Leland; Freddy Scott; Lawrence Chaney; Baga Chipz; Blu Hydrangea; Divina de Campo
- Producers: Leland; Freddy Scott

Frock Destroyers singles chronology
| "Big Ben" (2020) | "UK Hun?" (2021) | "Naughty List" (2022) |

On 6 April 2021 a new version of the song by the Frock Destroyers, comprising RuPaul's Drag Race UK series 1 contestants Baga Chipz, Blu Hydrangea and Divina de Campo, was released. The remixed version features new verses and chorus vocals from each member of the Frock Destroyers as well as series 2 winner Lawrence Chaney's verse from the original United Kingdolls version. This version, released several months after the Frock Destroyers' debut studio album Frock4Life, did not chart.

== Charts ==
| Chart (2021) | Peak position |
|---|---|
| Scottish Singles Sales (Official Charts) | 20 |
| UK Singles (Official Charts) | 27 |

== See also ==
- Girl groups in the Drag Race franchise
- Hun subculture
