= Decoded (EP) =

2019 EP by Divina de Campo

EP by Divina de Campo
- Released: 29 November 2019
- Length: 17:58
- Label: PEG

Divina de Campo chronology
Decoded (2019)	Red & Silver (2020)

Singles from Decoded
- 1. "A Drag Race Song" Released: 22 November 2019; 2. "Gratify" Released: 26 June 2020

Decoded is the debut EP by the English singer and drag performer Divina de Campo. It was released by PEG Records on 29 November 2019. The EP consists of six songs, which were written by Tomas Costanza, Paul Coultrup, Farrow, and Ashley Levy. "A Drag Race Song" and "Gratify" were released as singles and received music videos as well as remixes. Decoded received positive reviews from music critics.

== Composition and lyrics ==
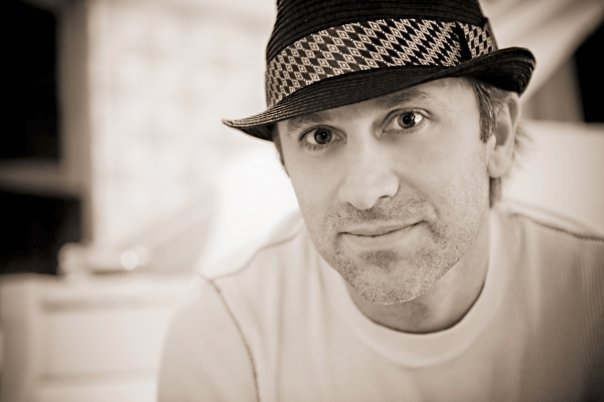
Tomas Costanza co-wrote all six songs on the EP.

Approximately 18 minutes long, Decoded has six tracks, with them being performed by Divina de Campo (the stage name of British drag queen Owen Richard Farrow) and written by Tomas Costanza, Paul Coultrup, Farrow, and Ashley Levy.

"A Drag Race Song" parodies music released by previous RuPaul's Drag Race contestants. Divina de Campo described it as a "tongue-in-cheek poke at everybody", and Attitude called the song a "catchy pop tune" that showcases her "high soprano and 4-octave range". The song's lyrics mention fellow RuPaul's Drag Race UK contestants Blu Hydrangea, Crystal, Gothy Kendoll, Scardey Kat and The Vivienne, and suggest Divina de Campo feels disliked by Drag Race judge Michelle Visage.

"Gratify" was described by Sam Damshenas of Gay Times as an "operatic dance anthem" and by Out in Jersey's Michael Cook as a "dance stomper". Divina de Campo said of the song: "Lyrically, it's that desire to give people exactly what they want. Musically, it's a mixture of what my career has been up until this point; classical and mainstream pop work. It's quite personal, but also not that personal!" Damshenas called "Pocket Rocket Princess" a "pop anthem", while Cook described "Down with You" as a "dance floor bopper showing definite influences" of Blondie and the Scissor Sisters.

== Release and promotion ==
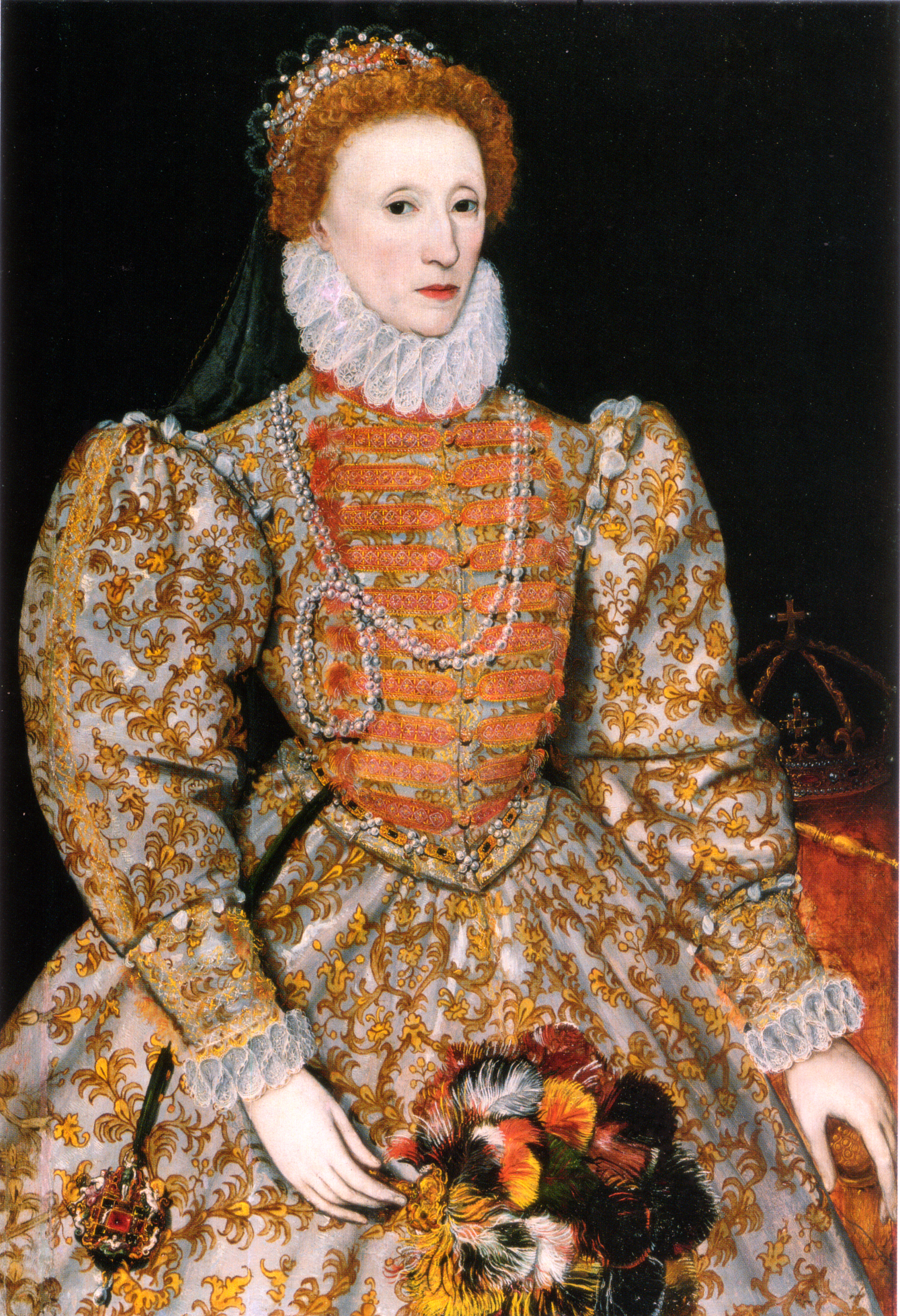
The music video for "Gratify" features fashion inspired by Elizabeth I (pictured: The "Darnley Portrait" of Elizabeth I, c. 1575)

Decoded was released on 29 November 2019, following the release of "A Drag Race Song" as the lead single on 22 November. In April 2020, Divina de Campo included the song on her "self-isolation playlist" published by Billboard Pride. A 12" format of Decoded was released for Record Store Day in 2020. The "SIBS Music Remix" of "A Drag Race Song" was released on 15 May 2020, and the Gratify EP featuring the original track and three remixes was released on 26 June.

The music video for "A Drag Race song" was released on 4 December 2019, coinciding with the airing of the final episode of the first series of RuPaul's Drag Race UK in the United States. The visual has features from Drag Race and music videos released by other contestants, and sees Divina de Campo "spinning them into a fourth-wall breaking extravaganza, as she constantly changes outfits and even seems to [mimic] well-worn lip sync dance moves from the show". She showcases multiple looks, including one in which she has an orange beard and hairy armpits, and wears various red wigs. Damshenas described the video as "hilarious", and said that it "pays tribute to camp, burlesque, femme and punk performers".

"Gratify" served as the single from the EP and received a music video as well. Damshenas said the video "serves superhero-realness" with fashion inspired by Elizabeth I and has a "sickening squad" of dancers from the House of Suarez vogueing. He called the "eerie" visual "one of the fiercest (and batshit crazy) music videos of the year".

== Critical reception ==
Decoded was met with positive reviews from music critics and Drag Race fans, according to Damshenas, who described "A Drag Race Song" as "hilarious" and "Gratify" as "infectious". Billboard's Stephen Daw also called the former track "hilarious". Cook said "A Drag Race Song" has all the characteristics of a "quintessential" Drag Race song and complimented Divina de Campo's "growling and impressive" vocal performance. He said the EP "turns the standard Drag Race competitor albums on their ears" and showcases the drag queen's versatility as a singer. Cook called "Validation" an "electronica gem" and considered "Down with You" the EP's best song.

== Track listing ==
All tracks are written by Tomas Costanza / Paul Coultrup / Owen Farrow / Ashley Levy.

Decoded track listing
No.	Title	Length
1.	"A Drag Race Song"	3:13
2.	"Gratify"	3:35
3.	"Elevate Her"	2:42
4.	"Validation"	3:09
5.	"Pocket Rocket Princess"	2:27
6.	"Down with You"	2:52
Total length:		17:58

Track listing adapted from AllMusic and the Apple Music
