= The Vivienne =

British drag performer (1992–2025)

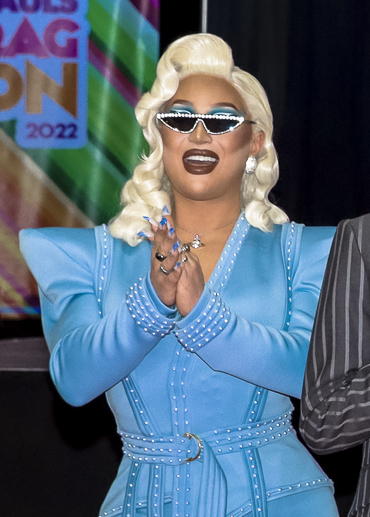
- The Vivienne at RuPaul's DragCon LA, 2022
- Born: James Lee Williams; 12 April 1992; Colwyn Bay, Conwy, Wales
- Died: 3 January 2025 (aged 32); Chorlton-by-Backford, Cheshire, England
- Occupations: Drag queen; singer; television personality
- Years active: 2015–2025
- Television: RuPaul's Drag Race UK; RuPaul's Drag Race All Stars; Dancing on Ice
- Spouse: David Ludford (m. 2019; div. 2023)

James Lee Williams (12 April 1992 – 3 January 2025), known professionally as The Vivienne, was a British drag queen who was the winner of the first series of RuPaul's Drag Race UK in 2019. They later competed in the seventh season of RuPaul's Drag Race All Stars in 2022 and became the first drag performer to compete on Dancing on Ice, placing third in the fifteenth series in 2023. In 2015, before the release of Drag Race UK, they were the UK drag ambassador for the American series RuPaul's Drag Race.

In addition to appearing on television, The Vivienne released music, including the extended play Bitch on Heels (2022), and acted on stage, notably as the Wicked Witch of the West in the 2024 UK tour of The Wizard of Oz.

== Early life ==
James Lee Williams was born to Cassie and Lee Williams on 12 April 1992 and grew up in Colwyn Bay and Towyn. They had a sister, Chanel. Williams began attending stage school at the age of 5 and performed in a production of Bugsy Malone. They attended Rydal Penrhos, came out as gay at age 14, and relocated to Liverpool to become a make-up artist at age 16. Williams was of Romani heritage.

== Career ==
Williams took the drag name Vivienne because they were known for wearing Vivienne Westwood clothing; they later added the definite article to make their name unique. They first discovered drag after watching a YouTube video of Chad Michaels performing a Cher impersonation number at a gay bar, and was further inspired by Derrick Barry's impersonation of Britney Spears. The Vivienne's first drag show was at Pink in Liverpool, followed by gigs in other bars such as Superstar Boudoir. On 28 May 2015, The Vivienne competed in a one-day event judged by RuPaul, Katie Price, and Jonathan Ross, taking place at Café de Paris, London, where they were placed in the top two alongside La Voix and then crowned the "UK Drag Ambassador for RuPaul's Drag Race." They were later flown to Los Angeles to make a cameo appearance on the eighth season of RuPaul's Drag Race (2016). The Vivienne briefly lived in Gran Canaria in 2017.

The Vivienne was a competitor in the first series of RuPaul's Drag Race UK in 2019. In the competition, they won three challenges, including the Snatch Game, in which they impersonated American politician Donald Trump and engaged in repartee with Baga Chipz as Margaret Thatcher. They ultimately won the competition on 21 November 2019 and were crowned "The UK's First Drag Superstar."

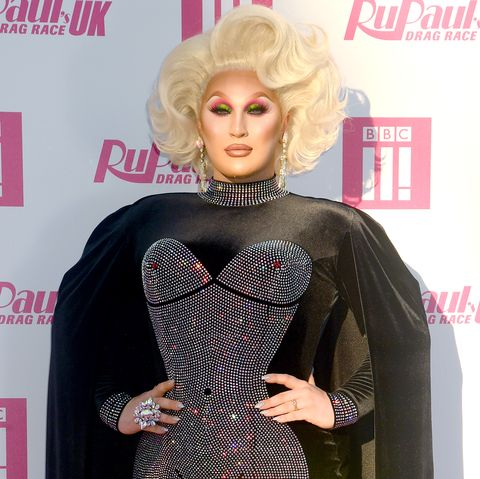
The Vivienne at the RuPaul's Drag Race UK launch in September 2019

In September 2019, The Vivienne competed with Courtney Act in Jag Race, a web series where drag performers race sports cars for charity in collaboration with Jaguar and Attitude magazine. They raced for Sahir House, a Liverpool charity that provides a space in which people living with HIV can speak freely without fear of prejudice, stigma, abuse, or exploitation. In November, they embarked on a three-month tour alongside their competitors from RuPaul's Drag Race UK, hosted by drag performer Alyssa Edwards. The next month, they reprised their Snatch Game impersonation of Donald Trump alongside Baga Chipz as Margaret Thatcher in Morning T&T, a fictional television news show. In an interview with Gay Times, they described the series as a "spoof of Good Morning Britain and Good Morning America."

In 2020, American production company World of Wonder announced a six-part series in which The Vivienne produced a music video while travelling in Los Angeles. The Vivienne Takes on Hollywood premiered on 9 April 2020 on BBC Three and WOW Presents Plus. The same month, they and Baga Chipz co-presented I Like to Watch UK, a web series where they humorously review original Netflix programmes.

The Vivienne made a guest appearance as themself on the soap opera Emmerdale in June 2021. In January 2022, they starred in Channel 4's Celebrity Hunted in aid of Stand Up to Cancer. That summer, they competed in the seventh season of RuPaul's Drag Race All Stars, where former winners of the franchise returned for the title of "Queen of All Queens." Despite winning three challenges and one lipsync battle, they failed to reach the top four of the season.

In October 2022, they were announced to be competing in the fifteenth series of the ITV ice-skating reality show Dancing on Ice, making them the first drag artist to participate in the show. On 12 March 2023, they finished in third place. In June 2023, they presented the "Scene of the Year" award at the 2023 British Soap Awards. In 2024, they starred as the Wicked Witch of the West in the UK tour and West End run of The Wizard of Oz. The Vivienne's final television appearance was on the Christmas special of the game show Blankety Blank on 26 December 2024.

=== Music ===
The Vivienne released their debut song "Tonight" on 20 May 2020, a dance-pop song they described as "the epitome of the word banger," combining "thumping bass and soaring vocals." They covered "You Spin Me Round (Like a Record)" (1984) by Dead or Alive on 21 October 2020, releasing the track alongside a lyric video. On this track, the drag performer paid tribute to the band's lead vocalist, the late Pete Burns. "Bitch on Heels" was released on 25 March 2021, written by American songwriter Diane Warren and produced by Swedish record producer Tannergard. The three singles were released on the EP Bitch on Heels in July 2022. The Vivienne also covered "Jingle Bell Rock" (1957) alongside Tia Kofi, released on 19 November 2021.

== Personal life ==
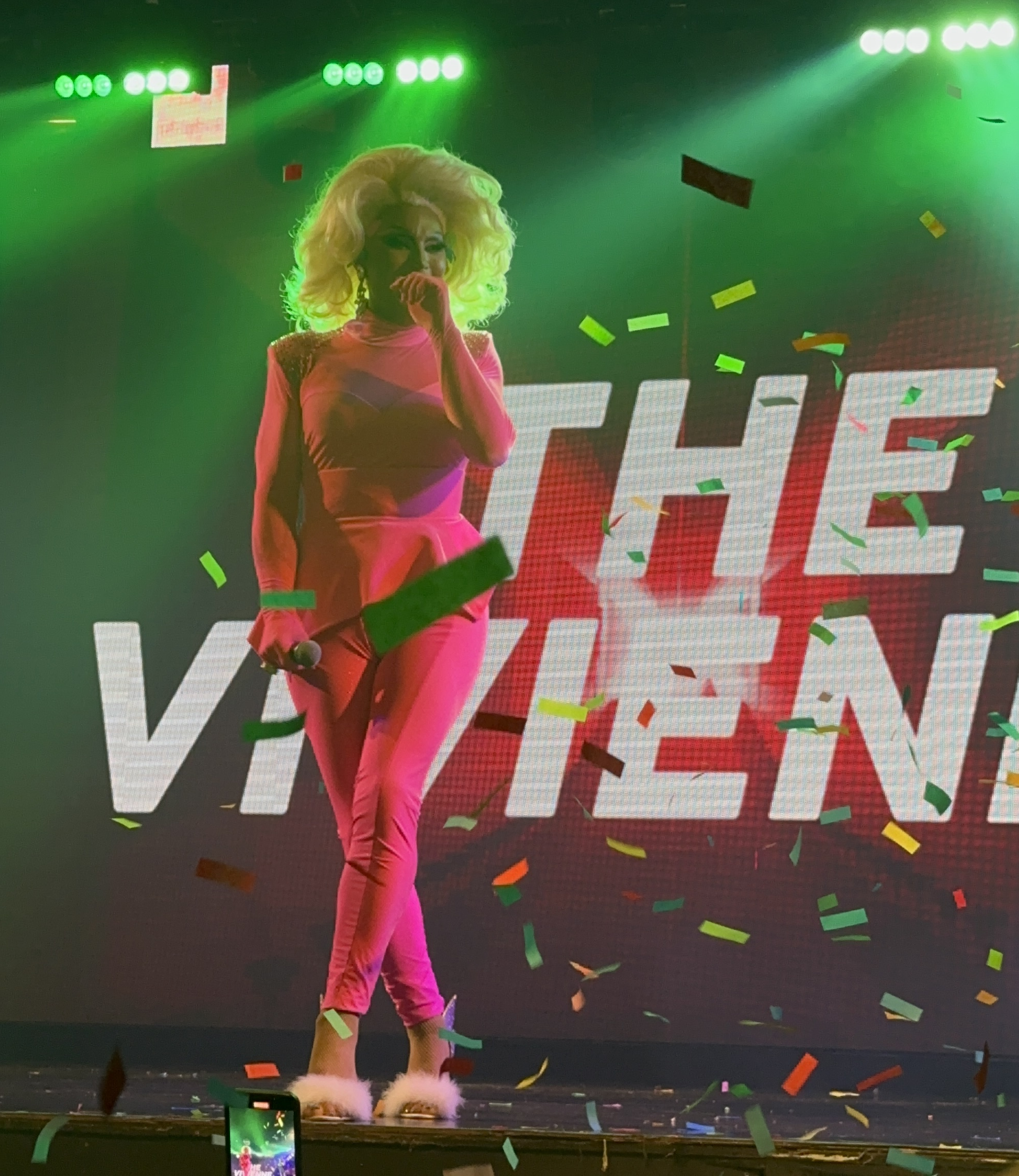
The Vivienne performing at Heaven Nightclub in London on 2 September 2023.

Williams used the pronouns they/them and was gay.

In December 2019, Williams married David Ludford in a ceremony at the gay nightclub Heaven. The couple confirmed their separation in April 2023 and remained friends.

In June 2023, Williams was the victim of a homophobic attack in a McDonald's restaurant in Liverpool. Merseyside Police confirmed that 51-year-old Alan Whitfield from Everton made homophobic remarks towards Williams and punched them in the face before leaving the scene. Williams spoke about the attack to highlight the fact that homophobia still existed in 2023 and urged members of the LGBTQ community to remain vigilant when out in public. Whitfield was found guilty of assault motivated by homophobia in December 2023 and was sentenced to 12 weeks in prison with an 18-month suspended sentence on 5 January 2024.

Williams struggled with drug addiction throughout their life, including a ketamine addiction. They praised the work of the Armistead Centre in Liverpool for their rehabilitation.

=== Death ===
On 5 January 2025, Cheshire Constabulary were called to an address located in Chorlton-by-Backford, following a report of a sudden death. It was announced later that evening that Williams had died at the age of 32. Their agent released a statement confirming that Williams had died over the weekend and that their family would not be releasing any further details at present. Initially, local police said the death was not suspicious. The area coroner later revealed that Williams was discovered in the home's bathroom from an "unnatural death" and requested further investigation. A hearing at Cheshire Coroner's Court in late June 2025 recorded a verdict of death by misadventure after a cardiac arrest occasioned by drug use. Testimony was presented that Williams was discovered in the bath, having died some time previously, probably "just under two days" earlier, on 3 January.

The RuPaul's Drag Race social media accounts paid tribute to Williams, memorialising as a "beacon of creativity and authenticity" who "embodied what it [meant] to be a true champion." Several Drag Race co-stars spoke in their honor, including Baga Chipz, who described them as their "bestest friend in the whole wide world," Michelle Visage, who said they were a "beacon to so many" who would be "so missed," and RuPaul, who said that his heart was "broken," describing them as an "incredibly talented queen" and a "lovely human being." The next day's performance of RuPaul's Drag Race Live! was dedicated to The Vivienne. Tributes appeared on RuPaul's Drag Race episode "Drag Queens Got Talent – Part 2" and on the first episode of the seventeenth series of Dancing on Ice.

Williams' funeral took place on 27 January 2025 at St. Margaret's Church in Bodelwyddan, Denbighshire, North Wales, and was attended by a number of British celebrities. The coffin arrived by horse-drawn carriage, pulled by black horses with green plumes. Floral tributes spelled "Vivienne", "James," and "Son"; the crown and sceptre awarded to RuPaul's Drag Race winners was carried into the church ahead of the coffin.

In March 2025, it was announced that The Vivienne's death resulted from a cardiac arrest associated with a ketamine overdose, and their family said that they will be working with charity Adferiad to campaign for open conversations about substance abuse.

A memorial documentary, Dear Viv, was later produced by World of Wonder and released on 28 August 2025. The film featured their family and fellow Drag Race alumni Baga Chipz, Blu Hydrangea, Cheryl, Crystal, Danny Beard, Michael Marouli, Monét X Change, Raja, Tia Kofi, and Trinity the Tuck.

== Discography ==
=== Extended plays ===
Title	Details
Bitch on Heels	Released: 22 July 2022; Label: Intention; Format: Digital download and streaming

=== Singles ===
==== As lead artist ====
Title	Year	Album	Ref.
"Tonight"	2020	Bitch on Heels	
"You Spin Me Round" (Initial Talk remix)	2020	Bitch on Heels	
"Bitch on Heels"	2021	Bitch on Heels	
"Jingle Bell Rock" (Slim Tim remix with Tia Kofi)	2021	Non-album singles	

==== As featured artist ====
Title	Year	Album	Ref.
"Break Up (Bye Bye)" (as Filth Harmony) (Note: The group is composed of Cheryl Hole, and Crystal, and The Vivienne. The version by Filth Harmony did not chart, while the version by the Frock Destroyers did.)	2019	Non-album singles	
"To the Moon" (RuPaul featuring Baga Chipz, Divina de Campo, and The Vivienne)	2019	Non-album singles	
"Legends" (RuPaul featuring the cast of RuPaul's Drag Race All Stars, Season 7)	2022	Non-album singles	
"2gether 4eva" (The Other Girls) (as The Other Girls) (Note: The group is composed of Jaida Essence Hall, Jinkx Monsoon, The Vivienne, and Yvie Oddly.)	2022	Non-album singles	

=== Charity singles ===
Title	Year	Album	Ref.
"We Werk Together" (with Ant & Dec, Lawrence Chaney, and Krystal Versace)	2022	Non-album singles	

=== Music videos ===
Title	Year	Album	Director(s)	Ref.
"Bitch on Heels"	2021	Bitch on Heels	Darius Shu	

== Filmography ==
=== Television ===
Year	Title	Role	Notes	Ref.
2016	RuPaul's Drag Race	Themself	Episode: "New Wave Queens"	
2016	Absolutely Fabulous: The Movie	Drag Queen	Television movie	
2017	Just Tattoo of Us	Themself	Series 1, Episode 7; guest	
2019	RuPaul's Drag Race UK	Themself	Series 1 (8 episodes); contestant (winner)	
2019	The Big Fat Quiz of the Year	Themself	2019 Edition; guest	
2020	RuPaul's Drag Race	Donald Trump	Episode: "I'm That Bitch"; guest	
2020	Celebrity Juice	Themself	2 episodes; guest	
2020	Trump in Tweets	Donald Trump credited as Narrator	BBC Three special	
2020	The Great British Sewing Bee	Themself	Celebrity New Year Special, 2020	
2021	RuPaul's Drag Race UK	Themself	Series 2, Episode 6: "Snatch Game"; guest	
2021	Emmerdale	Themself	Episode: "Emmerdale Pride"; cameo	
2021	CelebAbility	Themself	Series 5, Episode 2; contestant	
2021	Apocalypse Wow	Themself	Series 1, Episode 5; contestant	
2021	Karaoke Club: Drag Edition	Themself	5 episodes; contestant (runner-up)	
2021	All-Star Dance Off	Themself	ITV2 special; co-host with Steen Raskopoulos	
2021	The Weakest Link	Themself	New Year's Eve special; contestant	
2022	Celebrity Hunted	Themself	Series 4 (8 episodes); contestant	
2022	Ant and Dec's Saturday Night Takeaway	Themself	Series 18, Episode 1; "End of the Show" Show performer	
2022	This Is Going to Hurt	Drag Queen	Episode 4	
2022	Celebrity Mastermind	Themself	Series 20, Episode 5; contestant	
2022	RuPaul's Drag Race All Stars	Themself	Season 7 (12 episodes); contestant	
2022	Countdown to All Stars 7: You're a Winner Baby	Themself	VH1 special	
2022	The View	Themself	Season 18, Episode: "Alyssa Farah Griffin/Cast of "RuPaul's Drag Race All-Stars"	
2022	Celebrity Karaoke Club	Themself	Season 3, Episode 2; guest	
2022	The Chris & Rosie Ramsey Show	Themself	Series 1, Episode 4; guest	
2022	RuPaul's Drag Race UK	Themself	Series 4, Episode 10: "Grand Finale"; guest	
2023	That's My Jam	Themself	Series 1, Episode 7; contestant	
2023	Dancing on Ice	Themself	Series 15 (9 episodes); contestant (third place)	
2023	The Chase: Celebrity Special	Themself	Series 13, Episode 9; contestant	
2023	The British Soap Awards	Themself	Presenter, "Scene of the Year"	
2023	This Morning	Themself	Episode on 4 August; guest	
2024	Rhod Gilbert's Growing Pains	Themself	Series 5, Episode 10; guest	
2024	Blankety Blank	Themself	Series 4, Boxing Day special; guest	
2025	G'wed	Themself	Season 2, Episode 1 (posthumous appearance)	
2025	Dear Viv	Themself	Documentary (posthumous release)	

=== Web series ===
Year	Title	Role	Producer	Notes	Ref.
2015, 2020	Transformations	Themself	World of Wonder	Guest	
2019	Jag Race	Themself	Attitude	Season 1, Episode 3	
2019–2020	Morning T&T	Donald Trump	World of Wonder	7 episodes	
2020	The WOW Report	Themself	World of Wonder	Guest	
2020	I Like to Watch UK	Themself	Netflix UK	17 episodes; host	
2020	God Shave the Queens	Themself	World of Wonder	8 episodes	
2020	The Vivienne Takes on Hollywood	Themself	World of Wonder	6 episodes	
2020	Trump Learns Things	Donald Trump	World of Wonder	4 episodes	
2020	The Pit Stop	Themself	VH1	Season 5, Episode 3	
2022	Around the Table	Themself	Entertainment Weekly	Guest	
2022	BuzzFeed Celeb	Themself	BuzzFeed	Guest	
2022	Friendship Test	Themself	Glamour	Guest	
2022	Drip or Drop?	Themself	Cosmopolitan	Guest	
2022	Bring Back My Girls	Themself	World of Wonder	Season 1, Episode 4	

=== Stage ===
Year	Title	Role	Notes	Ref.
2023–2024	The Wizard of Oz	The Wicked Witch of the West / Ms Gulch	UK tour	
2024	Chitty Chitty Bang Bang	The Childcatcher	UK tour	

== Accolades ==
Name of the award ceremony, year presented, category, nominee(s) of the award, and the result of the nomination
Award	Year (Note: Indicates the year of ceremony. Each year is linked to the article about the awards held that year, wherever possible.)	Category	Recipient(s) and nominee(s)	Result	Ref.
Virgin Atlantic Attitude Awards	2022	The Inspiration Award	Themself	Won	

== Footnotes ==
Awards and achievements
Preceded by Inaugural	Winner of RuPaul's Drag Race UK; Series 1 (2019)	Succeeded by Lawrence Chaney
