= Scaredy Kat =

British drag queen

Ally Cubb
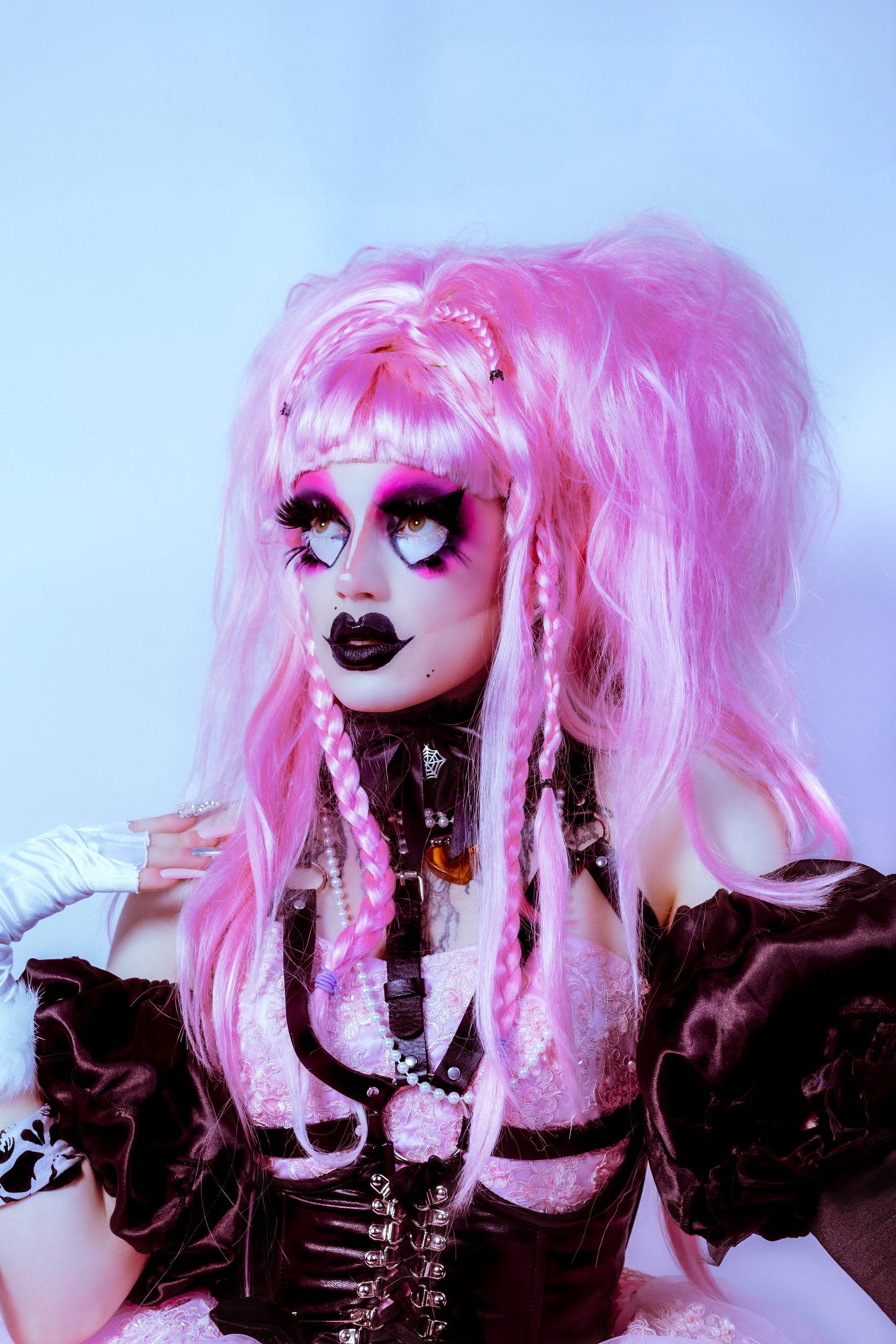
- Born: Alex "Ally" Cubb; May 18, 1999 (age 27); Bath, Somerset
- Other name: Scaredy Kat
- Education: Courtauld Institute of Art
- Occupation: Drag queen
- Television: RuPaul's Drag Race UK (series 1), The School for Good and Evil (film)

Ally Cubb is a British drag performer, comedian, actor, writer and musician best known for competing as Scaredy Kat on series one of RuPaul's Drag Race UK.

== Career ==
Ally Cubb's career began on RuPaul's Drag Race UK where he was the youngest queen ever (at 19-years-old) to compete within the British and American franchise. He was known for both having never performed prior to the show and also for being bisexual. Kat's lack of experience was summed up when she was knocked out of the competition, leaving with the exit line: "It wasn't a bad first gig." Following on from Drag Race, Scaredy Kat then appeared in BBC Three's Pls Like, Channel 4's Reasons to be Cheerful, and had his own mockumentary comedy sketch What is Modern Art? on BBC Three's Laugh Lessons where he played a parody of a deluded London art student.

In 2022, Cubb then acted in Netflix's The School for Good and Evil as the character Gregor Charming, a struggling prince that could not live up to the heroism of his father which subsequently saw him meet his demise. Following this, Cubb then turned his attention back to drag, music and content creation, seeing popularity with his street-interview TikTok account 'Street Queens' that, together with co-presenter Alik, has generated multiple viral moments.

== Personal life ==
Ally Cubb is from Wiltshire but moved to London in 2018 in order to pursue his creative career. He has a university degree in history of art from The Courtauld Institute of Art. He is now known to be living in Brighton, as seen in his social media content. In 2026, Cubb's partner and co-presenter Alik competed on RuPaul's Drag Race UK series 8, stating that whilst she was competing for herself, she was "also doing it for my partner Scaredy Kat as they deserve to see the crown at least once in their life".

== Discography ==
=== Extended Plays ===
- The REMIX bite me x not that into me x furby eyez (2024)

=== Singles ===
- Bedroom Queen (2019)
- Not That Into Me (feat. Tobre) (2023)
- furby eyez (feat. Tobre) (2023)
- Bite Me (feat. Bug & Tobre) (2023)
- Npc (feat. Storm Saint Claire & Tobre) (2023)
- Halloween Icons (2024)
- When Christmas Comes Around (feat. Divina de Campo) (2024)
- ur dad's hot (2025)
- Bedroom Bitch (2025)

== Filmography ==
=== Film ===
- The School for Good and Evil – Gregor

=== Television ===
- Trapped - as Alex
- RuPaul's Drag Race UK (series 1)
