= Bimini Bon-Boulash =

British drag performer (born 1993)

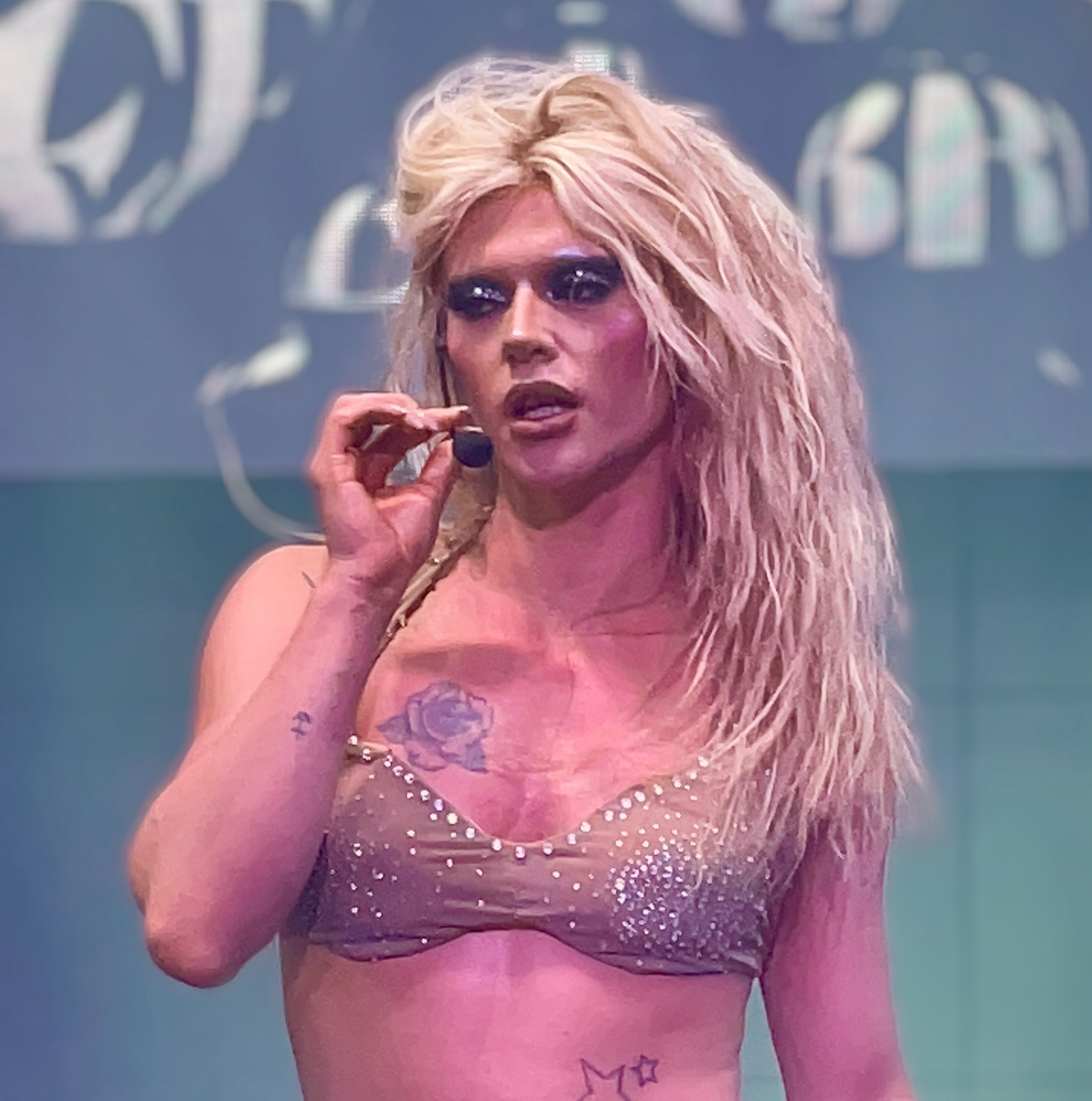
- Bimini performing in July 2021 in Torquay
- Born: Thomas George Graeme Hibbitts; 12 May 1993 (age 33); Great Yarmouth, England, UK
- Occupations: Drag queen, model, singer
- Years active: 2019–present
- Television: RuPaul's Drag Race UK (series 2)
- Musical career
- Genres: Electronica; breakbeat; big beat; Eurodance
- Label: Relentless
- Website: biminibabes.com

Thomas George Graeme Hibbitts (born 12 May 1993), better known by the stage name Bimini Bon-Boulash or Bimini, is an English drag queen, author, recording artist and model based in East London, and born in Great Yarmouth, England. They are best known for competing on the second series of RuPaul's Drag Race UK, where they placed as a runner-up.

== Early life and career ==
Hibbitts' parents separated when Hibbitts was a child. Hibbitts describes themself as being raised in a working-class environment. Hibbitts attended Lynn Grove Academy, moving to London in 2012 to study journalism at the London College of Communication, before completing a Masters in human rights at Goldsmiths, University of London. In London, Hibbitts discovered drag, beginning their career as a drag performer in 2017.

Bimini started performing drag professionally in 2019 and was heavily inspired to kick-start their career by the spirit of their fashion heroes Alexander McQueen, Vivienne Westwood, Iris van Herpen, and John Galliano. Bimini has stated that their greatest inspiration as to their look and aesthetic is Pamela Anderson. Their drag name derives from what they would be called if they were assigned female at birth, and the name of their first cat, Bonnie Boulash. Bimini is based in East London, and regularly performs across the capital.

In December 2020, Bimini was announced as one of twelve contestants competing on the second series of RuPaul's Drag Race UK. In Episode 1, Bimini lip-synced against Joe Black to "Relax" by Frankie Goes to Hollywood, which they won, sending Joe home. They later won four challenges, including the Snatch Game, where they portrayed Katie Price, becoming the first contestant in the British version to win four challenges. In Episode 9, Bimini became the first contestant to reach the finale after lip-syncing in the first episode. After a final lip-sync in Episode 10, they were announced as a runner-up, along with fellow competitor Tayce, to eventual winner Lawrence Chaney.

In February 2021, Bimini made their London Fashion Week runway debut alongside fellow Drag Race contestant A'Whora with Art School London, a genderless fashion label for designer Eden Loweth's AW21 collection. In March 2021, Bimini, alongside their fellow Drag Race finalists, was photographed and interviewed for The Guardian. In July 2021, Bimini embarked on a sold-out UK tour alongside A'Whora, Tayce and Lawrence Chaney for the United Kingdolls Tour with promoter Klub Kids. In February 2022, Bimini also joined "RuPaul's Drag Race UK: The Official Tour" alongside the entire cast of the second series of RuPaul's Drag Race UK, in association with World of Wonder and promoter Voss Events.

It was announced via Bimini's Instagram account in March 2021 they would be writing a book with the working title A Drag Queen's Guide to Life, scheduled for release in October 2021, and published by Penguin Books and Viking Books. The book was released with the title Release the Beast: A Drag Queen's Guide to Life. "Release the Beast" is a reference to Bimini's verse on "UK Hun?", which she performed with The United Kingdolls in RuPaul's Drag Race UK.

In June 2021, Bimini released their first single "God Save This Queen", as well as a corresponding music video.

On 21 August 2021, they presented the Saturday-afternoon slot on BBC Radio 1 from 1pm alongside Dean McCullough, as part of the radio station's "drag day". In 2021, a reference to Boulash was featured in a Sainsbury's Christmas advertisement. In the ad, a family is seated around the table playing the parlour game 'Who Am I?'. The grandmother is trying to guess which famous celebrity she is meant to be. As the camera pans across the table, the name Bimini can be seen written on a note stuck to the grandmother's head.

In November 2021, Bimini was awarded the GAY TIMES magazine's Honour for Drag Hero at a celebration in London, as well as featuring as the cover star for the GAY TIMES Honours edition.

After signing to Relentless Records, Bimini went on to write and record their debut EP, When the Party Ends, which was released in the summer of 2023, featuring 6 tracks that pay homage to their love of the electronic music scene of the 1990s.

In 2025, Bimini was named in the line-up for the series Celebrity SAS: Who Dares Wins. After successfully undertaking tasks which mimic the UK Special Forces selection course, Bimini reached the final five participants but failed the interrogation process in the final episode of the series.

== Personal life ==
Bimini is non-binary and uses they/them pronouns when out of drag and she/her pronouns when in drag. They spoke about coming to terms with their gender identity in a conversation on the third episode of Drag Race with fellow non-binary contestant Ginny Lemon. Their open conversation was praised by viewers and sparked confidence in many to discuss their gender identity with those closest to them. In 2021, Bimini was residing in East London, England, and was reported to have eaten an exclusively vegan diet for eight years.

== Filmography ==
=== Television ===
Year	Title	Role	Broadcasting channel	Notes	Ref
2021	RuPaul's Drag Race UK	Contestant	BBC Three/BBC One	Series 2 (Runner-up & Miss Congeniality)	
2021	Blind Love On First Date Island	Host	E4	Series 1 Host	
2025	Celebrity SAS Who Dares Wins	Contestant	Channel 4	Series 7	

=== Film ===
Year	Title	Role	Notes	Ref
2021	City of Queens	Themselves	Netflix film	
2022	The House	Police Officer #1 (voice only)	Netflix film	

=== Music videos ===
Year	Title	Artist	Ref
2020	"Baby"	Madison Beer	
2021	"My Head & My Heart"	Ava Max	
2021	"My House"	Jodie Harsh	
2021	"Rasputin"	Majestic x Boney M	
2021	"Confetti"	Little Mix	
2021	"God Save This Queen"	Bimini	
2022	"Tommy's Dream"	Bimini	
2022	"Different Kinds of People"	Bimini	
2023	"Rodeo"	Bimini	

=== Radio ===
Year	Title	Role	Notes	Ref
2021	Bimini & Dean McCullough	Themself	BBC Radio 1	

=== Web series ===
Year	Title	Notes	Ref
2021	YouTube Pride 2021	Guest	
2021	Fashion Photo RuView	Host of DRUK S3	

== Discography ==
=== Extended plays ===
Title	Details
When the Party Ends	Released: 14 July 2023; Label: Relentless Records; Format: Digital download, streaming

=== Singles ===
==== As lead artist ====
Year	Title	Album	Notes
2021	"God Save This Queen"	Non-album singles	
2022	"Tommy's Dream"	Non-album singles	
2022	"Different Kinds of People"	When the Party Ends	
2023	"Rodeo"	When the Party Ends	
2023	"Moonlight"	Non-album singles	
2023	"Fashion Nympho"	Non-album singles	
2024	"If You Get It You Get It"	Non-album singles	
2024	"Control"	Non-album singles	
2024	"Take It All"	Non-album singles	
2025	"Heartbreaker"	Non-album singles	
2025	"Keep on Dancing"	Non-album singles	

==== As featured artist ====
Title	Year	Peaks	Album
Title	Year	UK	Album
"UK Hun?" (among the United Kingdolls)	2021	27	Non-album singles
"A Little Bit of Love (Cast Version)" (RuPaul featuring the Cast of RuPaul's Drag Race UK, Series 2)	2021	–	Non-album singles
"Your Light Will Shine" (with Tia Kofi, Ellis Miah, Bentley Robles, Eden Hunter & Janethan)	2025	–	Non-album singles

== Bibliography ==
Autobiography

- Release the Beast: A Drag Queen's Guide to Life (Penguin, 2021)

== Stage ==
Year	Title	Promoter	Location	Ref
2021	United Kingdolls The Tour	Klub Kids	Torquay, Southampton, Newcastle, Glasgow, Sheffield, Leeds, Cardiff, Liverpool, Manchester, Birmingham and London	
2021	MODE	Klub Kids	Manchester, Cardiff, London, Glasgow and Amsterdam	
2022	RuPaul's Drag Race UK : The Official Tour	Voss Events / World of Wonder	Ipswich, Oxford, Edinburgh, Glasgow, Newcastle, Nottingham, Bournemouth, Southend, Manchester, Sheffield, Blackpool, Llandudno, Birmingham, Cardiff, Liverpool, Basingstoke, Portsmouth, Plymouth, London, Derby, Bristol, Bradford, Aberdeen, Southampton, Stockton, Brighton and Newport	
2022	United Kingdolls Tour	ITD Events / Klub Kids	Sydney, Adelaide, Melbourne, Brisbane, Auckland and Wellington	

== Awards and nominations ==
Year	Award ceremony	Category	Work	Results	Ref
2021	10th Annual Virgin Atlantic Attitude Awards	The Style Award	Themself	Won	
2021	Gay Times Honours	Drag Hero	Themself	Won	
2022	British Academy Television Awards	Virgin TV's Must-See Moment	Their verse in "UK Hun?"	Nominated	
2022	The WOWIE Awards	Best Book Award (The Reading is Fundamental Award)	Release the Beast	Nominated	
