= Frock4Life =

Studio album by Frock Destroyers
- Released: 11 December 2020
- Length: 23:25
- Label: World of Wonder
- Producer: Leland

Singles from Frock4Life
- 1. "Her Majesty" Released: 25 November 2020; 2. "Big Ben" Released: 4 December 2020

Frock4Life is the debut studio album by the Frock Destroyers, released by World of Wonder Records on 11 December 2020. It includes "Break Up Bye Bye", which was performed by group members Baga Chipz, Blu Hydrangea and Divina de Campo as contestants on the first series of RuPaul's Drag Race UK. The song was a commercial success, peaking at number 35 on the UK Singles Chart and number 44 on the U.S. Billboard Hot Dance/Electronic Songs chart, with it leading to the recording of the album. Leland served as executive producer and the main songwriter. "Her Majesty" and "Big Ben" served as singles for Frock4Life in 2020; the former also received a music video.

== Background and composition ==
Frock4Life is the debut studio album by the Frock Destroyers, a group formed by drag performers Baga Chipz, Blu Hydrangea and Divina de Campo as contestants on the first series of RuPaul's Drag Race UK in 2019. The album has ten tracks, including six songs, three interludes and a bonus remix. American singer-songwriter Leland served as executive producer and Frock4Life's primary songwriter.

Attitude's Jamie Tabberer said the album has "Chromatica-esque anthems". Nick Levine of The Independent said the "cheeky" vocal hook performed in unison by the trio on "Her Majesty" is reminiscent of the 1990s British female pop musical duo Shampoo, while he described "Big Ben" as "a Lady Gaga-style pop stomper about a man so well endowed he becomes a celebrity". Billboard's Stephen Daw called "Her Majesty" a "tongue-in-cheek kiss off to those who would try to detract from the trio" with a chorus in which they "[declare] their rightful place on the throne of drag music".

"Break Up Bye Bye" was originally performed by the Frock Destroyers during a girl group challenge on Drag Race, in which contestants were required to write and perform an original song. Lyrically, Baga Chipz alludes to anal sex in the song, which was written by Leland and Freddy Scott. MNEK served as a guest vocal coach during the girl group episode, with him also being credited as a producer. The pop anthem sees Divina de Campo sing "repeated whistle tone notes layered into the chorus".

== Release and promotion ==
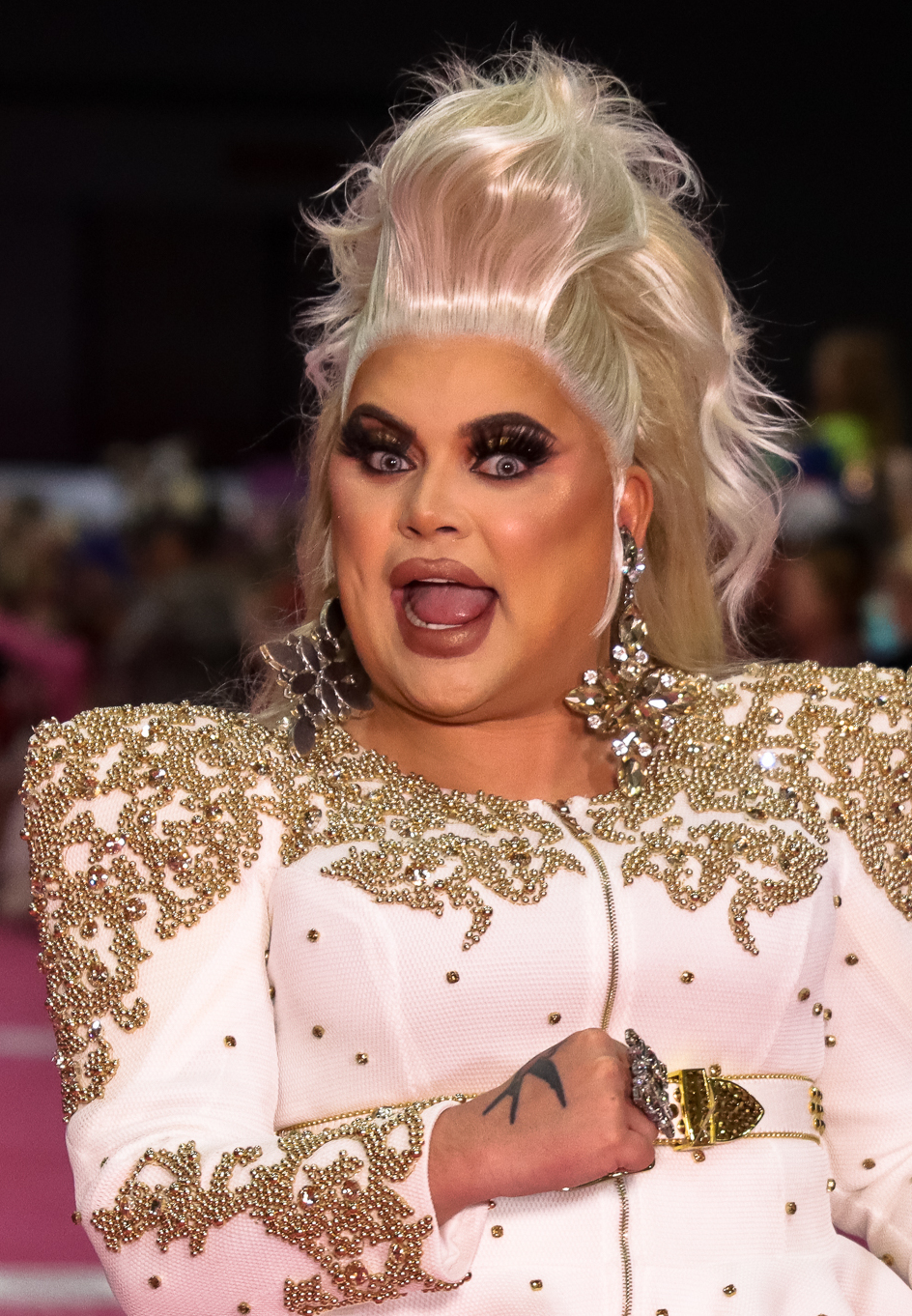
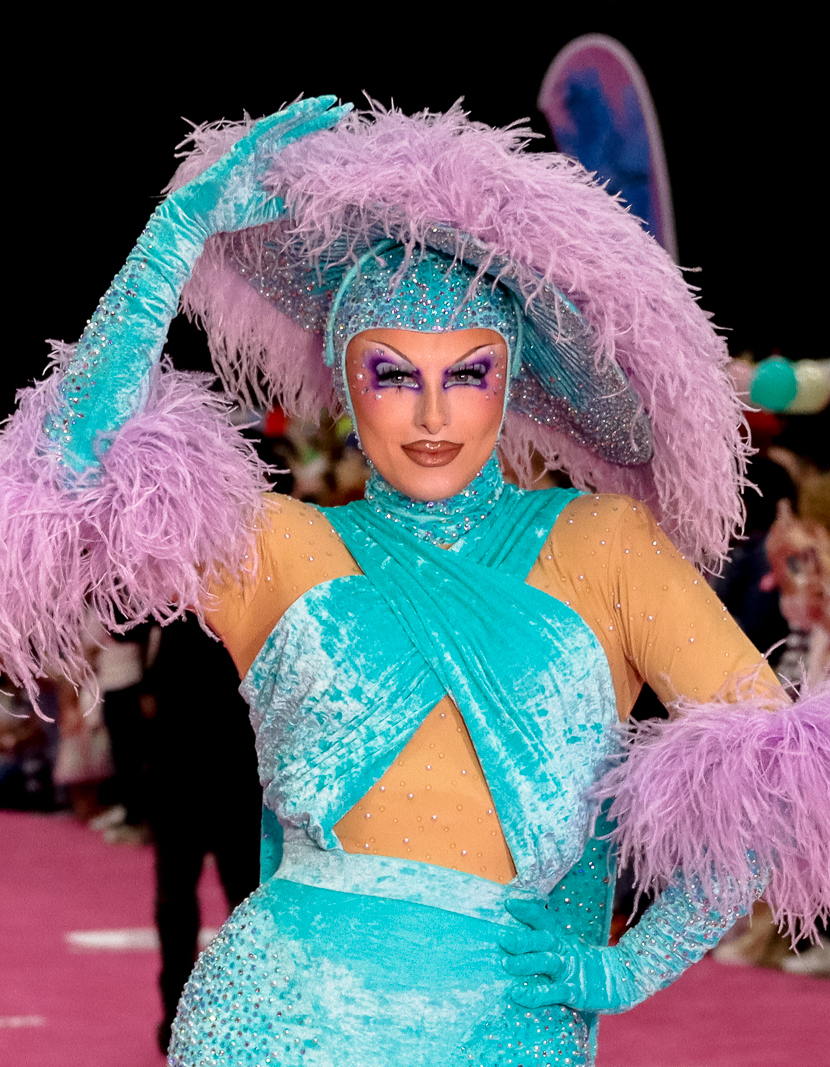
Baga Chipz (left) and Blu Hydrangea (right) in 2023

Following Drag Race, the Frock Destroyers embarked on a three-stop UK tour. Shows featuring individual and group performances were held at Powerhouse in Newcastle upon Tyne, Cruz 101 in Manchester and the Nightingale Club in Birmingham, during 17–19 November 2019. For Digital DragCon, an online event replacing RuPaul's DragCon LA in May 2020 because of the COVID-19 pandemic, Blu Hydrangea recreated the trio's performance of "Break Up Bye Bye" in isolation by impersonating Baga Chipz and Divina de Campo. Daniel Megarry of Gay Times complimented her work.

Frock4Life was released on 11 December 2020 via World of Wonder Records. "Her Majesty" had been released as a single on 25 November, along with the album's cover art. The song received a music video, which features the trio on the set of Drag Race wearing Victorian fashion. "Big Ben" was released as the second single in December 2020.

== Reception ==
After the girl group episode of Drag Race aired, "Break Up Bye Bye" peaked at number 35 on the UK Singles Chart and number 10 on The Official Big Top 40, becoming the highest chart position for a drag group. The song also prompted a petition for the Frock Destroyers to represent the United Kingdom in the Eurovision Song Contest to garner at least 10,000 signatures, while it peaked at number 44 on the Billboard Hot Dance/Electronic Songs chart in the United States.

Following the album's release, Levine called Frock4Life "witty and entertaining". Sam Damshenas of Gay Times described "Big Ben" as "infectious" and "quintessentially British". Christopher Rudolph of Logo TV's NewNowNext said "How's the Lighting?" is "really good".

== Track listing ==
Frock4Life track listing
No.	Title	Writer(s)	Producer(s)	Length
1.	"Frockmatica 1"	Leland, The Frock Destroyers	Leland, Gabe Lopez, Freddy Scott	0:37
2.	"Her Majesty"	Leland, The Frock Destroyers	Leland, Lopez	3:22
3.	"Frockmatica 2"	Leland, Gabe Reali	Leland, Lopez, Scott	1:00
4.	"Big Ben"	Leland, Reali	Leland, Lopez	3:03
5.	"Fame Whore"	Leland	Leland, Lopez	2:39
6.	"Frockmatica 3"	Leland, Scott, The Frock Destroyers	Leland, Scott, Lopez	0:29
7.	"Frock4Life"	Leland, Scott, The Frock Destroyers	Leland, Scott	2:59
8.	"How's the Lighting?"	Leland, Scott, The Frock Destroyers	Leland, Scott	3:03
9.	"Break Up Bye Bye"	Leland, Scott, The Frock Destroyers	Leland, Scott	2:31
10.	"Break Up Bye Bye" (Much Betta Remix)	Leland, Scott, The Frock Destroyers	Leland, Scott	3:36
Total length:				23:25

== See also ==
- Girl groups in the Drag Race franchise
