= Dear Viv =

2025 documentary film

- Directed by: Pete Williams
- Produced by: Steven Renney
- Cinematography: Steven Renney
- Edited by: Ron Hill; Jeffrey McHale
- Production company: World of Wonder
- Distributed by: WOW Presents Plus
- Release date: August 28, 2025
- Running time: 61 minutes
- Country: United States
- Language: English

Dear Viv is a 2025 documentary about drag performer The Vivienne. It was made available via WOW Presents Plus and BBC Three on 28 August. It was produced by World of Wonder (WOW). Baga Chipz, Cheryl Hole, Danny Beard, Raja, Tia Kofi and other drag performers participated in the film.

== Reception ==
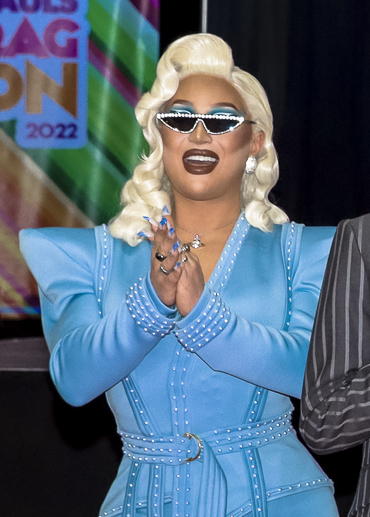
The Vivienne is the focus of the film.

Rachel Aroesti of The Guardian rated the documentary four out of five stars and called the tribute "astonishingly candid".

== See also ==
- List of LGBTQ-related films of 2025
