= Gothy Kendoll =

British drag queen

- Born: Samuel David Handley; 19 June 1997 (age 29); Leicester, Leicestershire, England
- Occupations: Drag queen, disc jockey
- Television: RuPaul's Drag Race UK (series 1); Celeb Ex in the City; RuPaul's Drag Race: UK vs. the World (series 2)

Samuel David Handley (born 19 June 1997), known professionally as Gothy Kendoll, is an English drag queen, DJ and OnlyFans creator from Leicester. He is best known for his appearances on the first series of RuPaul's Drag Race UK, the first series of the MTV's Celeb Ex in the City, and the second series of RuPaul's Drag Race: UK vs. the World. He released a single "Switch" in 2021.

== Early life and career ==
Samuel David Handley was born in Leicester, Leicestershire, on 19 June 1997. He started performing in drag in 2016, and worked as a DJ at events and parties.

In 2019, Gothy Kendoll was announced as one of the ten contestants on the first series of RuPaul's Drag Race UK. She was the first to be eliminated from the competition after losing a lip sync performance of "New Rules" by Dua Lipa to Vinegar Strokes, making her the first contestant to be eliminated from the British version of the show.

In 2020, Gothy Kendoll appeared as a cast member on the MTV reality series Celeb Ex in the City. In 2021, Gothy Kendoll released his debut single "Switch", which featured vocals from fellow Drag Race UK contestant Divina de Campo. Gothy Kendoll is also a creator on OnlyFans, often collaborating with twinks to create pornographic content.

In 2024, Gothy Kendoll appeared on the second series of RuPaul's Drag Race: UK vs. the World, placing seventh out of eleven queens after being eliminated by Marina Summers.

== Filmography ==
Year	Title	Notes	Ref
2019	RuPaul's Drag Race UK	Contestant; Series 1 (10th Place)	
2020	Celeb Ex in the City	Cast member	
2024	RuPaul's Drag Race: UK vs. the World	Contestant; Series 2 (7th Place)	

- Bring Back My Girls (2024)

== Discography ==
=== Singles ===
Year	Song	Ref
2021	"Switch" (with Divina de Campo & Forbid)	
2022	"Xlr8" (with Sminty Drop & Forbid)	
