= Frock Destroyers =

British musical trio

- Origin: England, United Kingdom
- Years active: 2019–present
- Label: World of Wonder
- Members: Baga Chipz; Divina de Campo; Blu Hydrangea

The Frock Destroyers are a British musical group formed by production company World of Wonder. It is composed of three drag performers: Baga Chipz, Divina de Campo, and Blu Hydrangea. They debuted through reality television series RuPaul's Drag Race UK, performing "Break Up (Bye Bye)" which first charted at number 35 on the Official Singles Chart.

== History ==
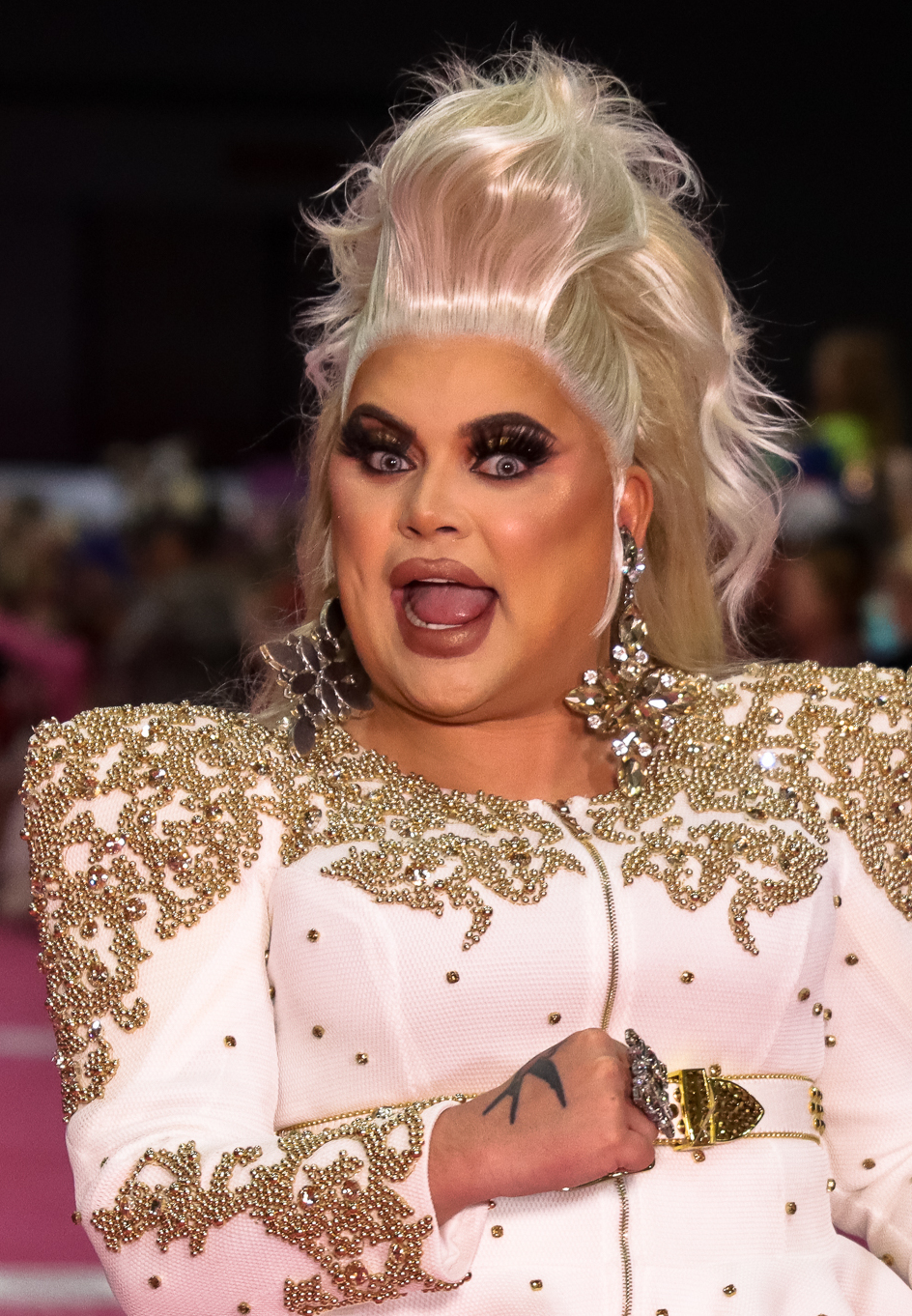
Baga Chipz

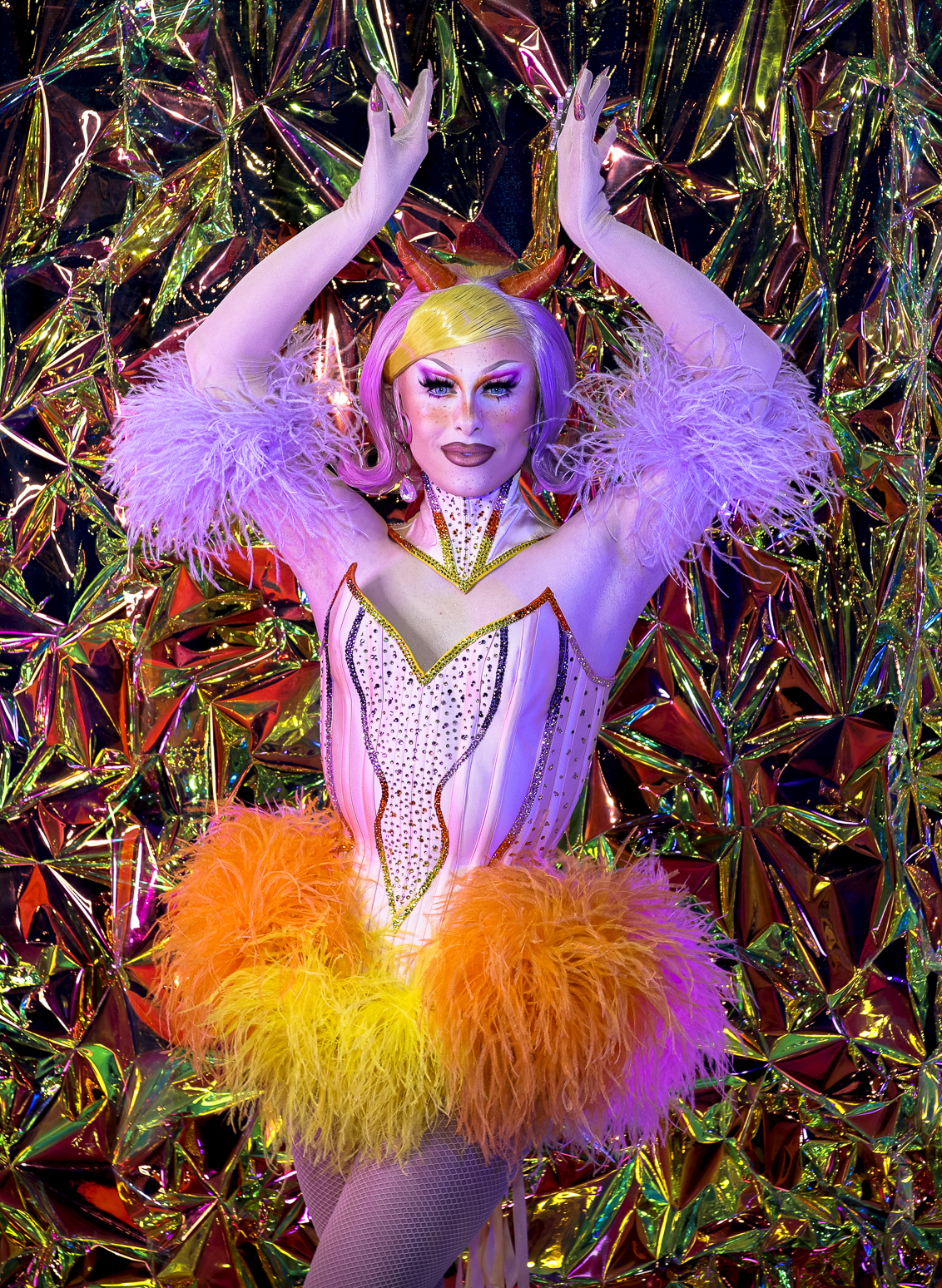
Blu Hydrangea

Baga Chipz, Divina de Campo, and Blu Hydrangea were originally put together in a musical group while participating for reality competition series RuPaul's Drag Race UK (2019), naming themselves as the Frock Destroyers, being a pun and homage to pornographic double act: the Cock Destroyers. They were tasked to write, record, and perform the song "Break Up (Bye Bye)" which is composed up from their own verses; the Frock Destroyers were announced as winners for the main challenge. The song was later released on 31 October 2019 and it proved to be an instant hit for British and international viewers.

Fans soon launched a campaign to have the Frock Destroyers represent the United Kingdom in the Eurovision Song Contest (2020). It was later reported by Gay Times that it garnered over 4,000 signatures through website Change.org on 4 November 2019. Media outlets also suggested it could appear on the Official Charts Company (OCC) for the United Kingdom. (Note: Supported by multiple references from Capital, Huffington Post UK, and Wiwibloggs.) "Break Up (Bye Bye)" peaked at number 35 on the Official Singles Chart, becoming the highest charting song by a drag performer, since RuPaul's "Supermodel (You Better Work)" in 1992.

The group released the single "Her Majesty" on 25 November 2020. Their second single, "Big Ben" was released on 8 December 2020, along with a lyric video. The Frock Destroyers released their debut studio album called Frock4Life on 11 December 2020.

WOW Presents Plus announced a four-part docuseries named "Frock Destroyers: Frockumentary", which goes behind the scenes the trio's performance during the COVID-19 pandemic, and their debut album: Frock4Life. The docuseries premiered on 15 March 2022.

== Discography ==
=== Studio album ===
Title	Details	Ref.
Frock4Life	Released: 11 December 2020; Label: World of Wonder Records; Formats: Digital download	

=== Singles ===
Title	Year	Peak chart positions		Album
Title	Year	UK	US Elec.	Album
"Break Up (Bye Bye)"	2019	35	45	Frock4Life
"Her Majesty"	2020	—	—	Frock4Life
"Big Ben"	2020	—	—	Frock4Life
"UK Hun?" (featuring Lawrence Chaney)	2021	—	—	—N/a
"Naughty List"	2022	—	—	—N/a
"—" denotes a recording that failed to chart, was ineligible for the chart or was not released.

== See also ==
- Girl groups in the Drag Race franchise
- List of drag groups
