= RuPaul's Drag Race UK series 2 =

2021 series of RuPaul's Drag Race UK

RuPaul's Drag Race UK
- Series 2
- Promotional poster for series two
- Hosted by: RuPaul
- Judges: RuPaul; Michelle Visage; Alan Carr; Graham Norton
- No. of contestants: 12
- Winner: Lawrence Chaney
- Runners-up: Bimini Bon-Boulash; Tayce
- No. of episodes: 10

Release
- Original network: BBC Three / BBC One (UK); WOW Presents Plus (International)
- Original release: 14 January – 18 March 2021

Season chronology
- ← Previous; Series 1 Next → Series 3

The second series of RuPaul's Drag Race UK began airing on 14 January 2021 on the BBC Three section of BBC iPlayer and WOW Presents Plus streaming service. The series was confirmed and casting was closed on 15 November 2019. Production was suspended mid 2020 due to the COVID-19 pandemic but resumed late 2020. The cast of 12 new queens was announced on 16 December 2020 and the series premiered on 14 January 2021. It was also announced a special episode RuPaul's Drag Race UK: Queens on Lockdown would air, following the queens during the first lockdown. This special episode was released on 12 February.

The winner of the second series of RuPaul's Drag Race UK was Lawrence Chaney, with Bimini Bon-Boulash and Tayce as the runners-up.

The United Kingdolls version of "UK Hun?", which featured in the fifth episode of the series, reached number 27 in the Official UK Charts.

Cherry Valentine died on 18 September 2022 at the age of 28. Their cause of death was originally undisclosed but a coroner's inquest ruled it a suicide in February 2023.

== Contestants ==
Ages, names, and cities stated are at time of filming.

Contestants of RuPaul's Drag Race UK series 2 and their backgrounds
Contestant	Age	Hometown	Outcome
Lawrence Chaney	23	Glasgow, Scotland	Winner
Bimini Bon-Boulash	26	Great Yarmouth, England	Runners-up
Tayce	25	Newport, Wales	Runners-up
Ellie Diamond	21	Dundee, Scotland	4th place
A'Whora	23	Worksop, England	5th place
Sister Sister	31	Liverpool, England	6th place
Tia Kofi	30	South London, England	7th place
Joe Black	30	Brighton, England	8th place (Note: Joe Black originally placed twelfth before being asked back to the competition.)
Veronica Green	34	Rochdale, England	9th place (Note: Veronica Green was forced to withdraw from the competition after testing positive for COVID-19. Veronica was, however, given an open invitation for series 3.)
Ginny Lemon	31	Worcester, England	10th place (Note: Ginny Lemon forfeited the lip sync by exiting the stage at the beginning of the performance.)
Asttina Mandella	27	East London, England	11th place
Cherry Valentine	26	Darlington, England	12th place

== Contestant progress ==
Legend:

Lawrence Chaney won RuPaul's Drag Race UK series 2.
Bimini Bon-Boulash and Tayce were the runners-up.
WIN indicates that the contestant won the challenge.
SAFE indicates that the contestant was declared safe by the judges.
BTM (Bottom) indicates that the contestant was up for elimination.
ELIM (Eliminated) indicates that the contestant was eliminated.
WDR (Withdraw) indicates that Veronica Green was removed from the competition due to contracting COVID-19.
QUIT indicates that Ginny Lemon quit the competition.
OUT indicates that the contestant was not voted to return to the competition.
Guest indicates that the contestant returned as a guest.

Contestants progress with placements in each episode
Contestant	Episode									
Contestant	1	2	3	4	5	6	7	8	9	10
Lawrence Chaney	SAFE	SAFE	WIN	WIN	WIN	BTM	SAFE	SAFE	SAFE	Winner
Bimini Bon-Boulash	BTM	SAFE	SAFE	SAFE	WIN	WIN	SAFE	WIN	WIN	Runner-up
Tayce	SAFE	BTM	SAFE	SAFE	WIN	SAFE	BTM	BTM	BTM	Runner-up
Ellie Diamond	SAFE	SAFE	SAFE	SAFE	SAFE	SAFE	SAFE	SAFE	BTM	Eliminated
A'Whora	SAFE	SAFE	SAFE	SAFE	WIN	SAFE	WIN	ELIM		Guest
Sister Sister	SAFE	SAFE	SAFE	BTM	SAFE	SAFE	ELIM			Guest
Tia Kofi	SAFE	SAFE	BTM	SAFE	BTM	ELIM				Guest
Joe Black	ELIM				ELIM					Guest
Veronica Green	SAFE	WIN	SAFE	SAFE	WDR					Guest
Ginny Lemon	SAFE	SAFE	SAFE	QUIT						Guest
Asttina Mandella	WIN	SAFE	ELIM		OUT					Guest
Cherry Valentine	SAFE	ELIM			OUT					Guest

== Lip syncs ==
Legend:

The contestant was eliminated after their first time in the bottom.
The contestant was eliminated after their second time in the bottom.
The contestant was eliminated after their third time in the bottom.
The contestant was in the bottom, but quit the competition at the beginning of the lip sync.
The contestant won the Lip Sync for the Crown and was declared the winner of the season.

Episode	Bottom contestants			Song	Eliminated
1	Bimini Bon-Boulash	vs.	Joe Black	"Relax" (Frankie Goes to Hollywood)	Joe Black
2	Cherry Valentine	vs.	Tayce	"Memory" (Elaine Paige)	Cherry Valentine
3	Asttina Mandella	vs.	Tia Kofi	"Don't Start Now" (Dua Lipa)	Asttina Mandella
4	Ginny Lemon	vs.	Sister Sister	"You Keep Me Hangin' On" (Kim Wilde)	Ginny Lemon
5	Joe Black	vs.	Tia Kofi	"Don't Leave Me This Way" (The Communards)	Joe Black
6	Lawrence Chaney	vs.	Tia Kofi	"Touch Me (All Night Long)" (Cathy Dennis)	Tia Kofi
7	Sister Sister	vs.	Tayce	"Don't Be So Hard on Yourself" (Jess Glynne)	Sister Sister
8	A'Whora	vs.	Tayce	"You Don't Have to Say You Love Me" (Dusty Springfield)	A'Whora
9	Ellie Diamond	vs.	Tayce	"Last Thing on My Mind" (Steps)	None
Episode	Final contestants			Song	Winner
10	Bimini Bon-Boulash vs. Lawrence Chaney vs. Tayce			"I'm Still Standing" (Elton John)	Lawrence Chaney

== Guest judges ==
Listed in chronological order:

- Elizabeth Hurley, actress, businesswoman and model
- Sheridan Smith, actress and singer
- Jourdan Dunn, model and actress
- Lorraine Kelly, television presenter
- MNEK, singer and music producer
- Jessie Ware, singer
- Maya Jama, television presenter
- Dawn French, actress, comedienne, writer and presenter

=== Special guests ===
Guests who appeared in episodes, but did not judge on the main stage.

Episode 1

- Kevin McDaid, photographer

Episode 2

- Dane Chalfin, vocal coach
- Jay Revell, choreographer
- Kieran Daley Ward, choreographer

Episode 3

- Jodie Harsh, drag queen and DJ music producer

Episode 5

- Ian Masterson, producer and songwriter

Episode 6

- Gemma Collins, media personality and businesswoman
- The Vivienne, winner of RuPaul's Drag Race UK Series 1
- Baga Chipz, contestant from RuPaul's Drag Race UK Series 1

Episode 7

- Raven, runner-up of both RuPaul's Drag Race Season 2 and All Stars 1

Episode 9

- Natalie Cassidy, EastEnders actress

== Episodes ==
No. overall	No. in series	Title	Original release date
9	1	"Royalty Returns"	14 January 2021
Twelve new queens enter the workroom. For the first mini-challenge, the queens do a tennis photoshoot. Lawrence Chaney wins the mini-challenge. For the main challenge, the queens present two looks on the runway: UK Gay Icons and Queen of Your Hometown. On the runway, Asttina Mandella, Ellie Diamond, and Lawrence Chaney receive positive critiques, with Asttina Mandella winning the challenge. Bimini Bon-Boulash, Joe Black, and Sister Sister receive negative critiques, with Sister Sister being safe. Bimini Bon-Boulash and Joe Black lip-sync to "Relax" by Frankie Goes to Hollywood. Bimini Bon-Boulash wins the lip-sync and Joe Black is the first queen to sashay away.: Guest Judge: Elizabeth Hurley; Alternating Judge: Graham Norton; Mini-Challenge: Tennis photoshoot; Mini-Challenge Winner: Lawrence Chaney; Main Challenge: Present two looks on the runway; Runway Theme: UK Gay Icons and Queen of Your Hometown; Challenge Winner: Asttina Mandella; Bottom Two: Bimini Bon-Boulash and Joe Black; Lip-Sync Song: "Relax" by Frankie Goes to Hollywood; Eliminated: Joe Black; Farewell Message: "Auf wiedersehen you camp old bitches. Love you, see you soon ♡ JB"
10	2	"Rats: The Rusical"	21 January 2021
For this week's mini-challenge, the queens elect a Drag Race cabinet in the categories Secretary of Shade, Trade Minister, Leader of the House of Loading It Up and Baroness Basic. A'Whora, Tayce, Lawrence Chaney, and Tia Kofi win the mini-challenge, respectively. For the main challenge, the queens perform in Rats: The Rusical.: Asttina Mandella plays Jane; A'Whora plays Miss Dysentery; Bimini Bon-Boulash plays Depravity; Cherry Valentine, Lawrence Chaney, and Sister Sister play The Rat Pack; Ellie Diamond plays Scabies; Ginny Lemon plays Dame Doody Stench; Tayce plays Scat Rat; Tia Kofi plays Specimen One; Veronica Green plays Evita von Fleas; On the runway, category is Surprise, Surprise. Ellie Diamond, Tia Kofi, and Veronica Green receive positive critiques, with Veronica Green winning the challenge. Cherry Valentine, Lawrence Chaney, and Tayce receive negative critiques, with Lawrence Chaney being safe. Cherry Valentine and Tayce lip-sync to "Memory" by Elaine Paige. Tayce wins the lip-sync and Cherry Valentine sashays away.: Guest Judge: Sheridan Smith; Alternating Judge: Alan Carr; Mini-Challenge: Elect a Drag Race cabinet; Mini-Challenge Winners: A'Whora, Lawrence Chaney, Tayce, and Tia Kofi; Main Challenge: Rats: The Rusical; Runway Theme: Surprise, Surprise; Challenge Winner: Veronica Green; Bottom Two: Cherry Valentine and Tayce; Lip-Sync Song: "Memory" by Elaine Paige; Eliminated: Cherry Valentine; Farewell Message: "Always remember. Love yourself first. Can't wait to pop your cherries again! Love C ♡"
11	3	"Who Wore It Best?"	28 January 2021
For this week's mini-challenge, the queens participate in a limbo extravaganza. Tayce and Veronica Green win the mini-challenge. For the main challenge, the queens create a look with the same colors and fabrics as your drag sister.: Black: A'Whora vs. Tayce; Blue: Asttina Mandella vs. Bimini Bon-Boulash; Gold: Ellie Diamond vs. Lawrence Chaney; Green: Tia Kofi vs. Veronica Green; Pink: Ginny Lemon vs. Sister Sister; On the runway, category is Who Wore It Best? A'Whora, Bimini Bon-Boulash, Lawrence Chaney, Sister Sister, and Veronica Green receive positive critiques, with Lawrence Chaney winning the challenge. Asttina Mandella, Ginny Lemon, and Tia Kofi receive negative critiques, with Ginny Lemon being safe. Asttina Mandella and Tia Kofi lip-sync to "Don't Start Now" by Dua Lipa. Tia Kofi wins the lip-sync and Asttina Mandella sashays away.: Guest Judge: Jourdan Dunn; Alternating Judge: Graham Norton; Mini-Challenge: Limbo Extravaganza; Mini-Challenge Winners: Tayce and Veronica Green; Main Challenge: Create a look with the same colors and fabrics as your drag sister; Runway Theme: Who Wore It Best?; Challenge Winner: Lawrence Chaney; Bottom Two: Asttina Mandella and Tia Kofi; Lip-Sync Song: "Don't Start Now" by Dua Lipa; Eliminated: Asttina Mandella; Farewell Message: "Rude. Always to remember to have RAT BITE FEVER. Love you all FOREVER + ALWAYS. Asttina"
12	4	"Morning Glory"	4 February 2021
For this week's mini-challenge, the queens present a cake as if it was their own. Bimini Bon-Boulash wins the mini-challenge. For the main challenge, the queens host in the new daytime show, Morning Glory.: Main Hosts: Bimini Bon-Boulash and Tayce; Party Planners: Sister Sister and Veronica Green; Pre-School Kids Presenters: Ellie Diamond and Lawrence Chaney; Money Saving Experts: A'Whora and Tia Kofi; Weather Reporter: Ginny Lemon; On the runway, category is Monster Mashup. A'Whora, Bimini Bon-Boulash, and Lawrence Chaney receive positive critiques, with Lawrence Chaney winning the challenge. Ginny Lemon, Sister Sister, and Veronica Green receive negative critiques, with Veronica Green being safe. Ginny Lemon and Sister Sister lip-sync to "You Keep Me Hangin' On" by Kim Wilde. During the lip-sync, Ginny Lemon walks off stage and quits the competition. Because of this decision, Sister Sister wins the lip-sync.: Guest Judge: Lorraine Kelly; Alternating Judge: Alan Carr; Mini-Challenge: Present a cake as if it was your own; Mini-Challenge Winner: Bimini Bon-Boulash; Main Challenge: Host in the new daytime show Morning Glory; Runway Theme: Monster Mashup; Challenge Winner: Lawrence Chaney; Bottom Two: Ginny Lemon and Sister Sister; Lip-Sync Song: "You Keep Me Hangin' On" by Kim Wilde; Quit: Ginny Lemon; Farewell Message: "Witches unite! Fancy a slice? △"; Note: This was the final episode filmed before lockdown. Filming resumed later in the year.
13	5	"The RuRuvision Song Contest"	11 February 2021
After a seven month lockdown break, the queens returned to the competition, with the exception of Veronica Green, who was removed from the competition after testing positive for COVID-19, although she received an open invitation to return for season three. Previously eliminated queens, Asttina Mandella, Cherry Valentine, and Joe Black, return to win a spot back in the competition. The remaining queens will vote for one of the eliminated queens to return to the competition. Joe Black receives the most votes and officially returns to the competition. For this week's main challenge, the queens write, record, and perform verses to "UK Hun?".: Team Bananadrama: Ellie Diamond, Joe Black, Sister Sister, and Tia Kofi; Team United Kingdolls: A'Whora, Bimini Bon-Boulash, Lawrence Chaney, and Tayce; On the runway, category is A Day at the Seaside. Team United Kingdolls is the winning team, with A'Whora, Bimini Bon-Boulash, Lawrence Chaney, and Tayce all winning the challenge. Team Bananadrama is the losing team. Joe Black, Sister Sister, and Tia Kofi receive negative critiques, with Sister Sister being safe. Joe Black and Tia Kofi lip-sync to "Don't Leave Me This Way" by The Communards. Tia Kofi wins the lip-sync and Joe Black sashays away.: Removed: Veronica Green; Returned: Joe Black; Guest Judge: MNEK; Alternating Judge: Graham Norton; Main Challenge: Write, record, and perform verses to "UK Hun?"; Runway Theme: A Day at the Seaside; Challenge Winners: A'Whora, Bimini Bon-Boulash, Lawrence Chaney, and Tayce; Bottom Two: Joe Black and Tia Kofi; Lip-Sync Song: "Don't Leave Me This Way" by the Communards; Eliminated: Joe Black; Farewell Message: "I can't be bothered writing another message. I am only capable of so many mirror messages and goodbyes. Bye. (again) See you soon! ♡"
14	6	"Snatch Game"	18 February 2021
For this week's main challenge, the queens play the Snatch Game. Gemma Collins and Michelle Visage star as the celebrity contestants. The cast consisted of: A'Whora as Louie Spence; Bimini Bon-Boulash as Katie Price; Ellie Diamond as Matt Lucas; Lawrence Chaney as Miriam Margolyes; Sister Sister as Sally Morgan; Tayce as Jane Turner; Tia Kofi as Mel B; On the runway, category is Preherstoric. Bimini Bon-Boulash and Tayce receive positive critiques, with Bimini Bon-Boulash winning the challenge. A'Whora, Lawrence Chaney, and Tia Kofi receive negative critiques, with A'Whora being safe. Lawrence Chaney and Tia Kofi lip-sync to "Touch Me (All Night Long)" by Cathy Dennis. Lawrence Chaney wins the lip-sync and Tia Kofi sashays away.: Guest Judge: Jessie Ware; Alternating Judge: Alan Carr; Main Challenge: Snatch Game; Runway Theme: Preherstoric; Challenge Winner: Bimini Bon-Boulash; Bottom Two: Lawrence Chaney and Tia Kofi; Lip-Sync Song: "Touch Me (All Night Long)" by Cathy Dennis; Eliminated: Tia Kofi; Farewell Message: "You’re all camp cows! Be proud. Be kind. Give it 100% #Tiawozrobbed x"
15	7	"Lockdown Supersheroes"	25 February 2021
For this week's mini-challenge, the queens read each other to filth. Sister Sister wins the mini-challenge. For the main challenge, the queens create a "Lockdown Supershero" outfit made from unconventional materials. On the runway, category is Lockdown Supersheroes. A'Whora and Ellie Diamond receive positive critiques, with A'Whora winning the challenge. Lawrence Chaney, Sister Sister, and Tayce receive negative critiques, with Lawrence Chaney being safe. Sister Sister and Tayce lip-sync to "Don't Be So Hard on Yourself" by Jess Glynne. Tayce wins the lip-sync and Sister Sister sashays away.: Guest Judge: Maya Jama; Alternating Judge: Graham Norton; Mini-Challenge: Reading is Fundamental; Mini-Challenge Winner: Sister Sister; Main Challenge: Create a "Lockdown Supershero" outfit made from unconventional materials; Runway Theme: Lockdown Supersheroes; Challenge Winner: A'Whora; Bottom Two: Sister Sister and Tayce; Lip-Sync Song: "Don't Be So Hard on Yourself" by Jess Glynne; Eliminated: Sister Sister; Farewell Message: "HATE YOUR HAIR HOPE YOU LOSE. ABSOLUTELY LOVE YOU CAMP COWS Sister Sister x"
16	8	"Stoned on the Runway"	4 March 2021
For this week's mini-challenge, the queens do a butch performance of RuPaul's song "Kitty Girl". Ellie Diamond wins the mini-challenge. For the main challenge, the queens perform a stand-up comedy act about love in front of the judges. On the runway, category is Stoned on the Runway. Bimini Bon-Boulash and Lawrence Chaney receive positive critiques, with Bimini Bon-Boulash winning the challenge. A'Whora, Ellie Diamond and Tayce receive negative critiques, with Ellie Diamond being safe. A'Whora and Tayce lip-sync to "You Don't Have to Say You Love Me" by Dusty Springfield. Tayce wins the lip-sync and A'Whora sashays away.: Guest Judge: Dawn French; Alternating Judge: Alan Carr; Mini-Challenge: Butch performance of RuPaul's song "Kitty Girl"; Mini-Challenge Winner: Ellie Diamond; Main Challenge: Perform a stand-up comedy act about love in front of the judges; Runway Theme: Stoned on the Runway; Challenge Winner: Bimini Bon-Boulash; Bottom Two: A'Whora and Tayce; Lip-Sync Song: "You Don't Have to Say You Love Me" by Dusty Springfield; Eliminated: A'Whora; Farewell Message: "Talk about Sexual TENSION!! I'll See you all at the Sauna Lots of love A'Whora xoxo"
17	9	"BeastEnders"	11 March 2021
For this week's mini-challenge, the queens have a bitch-fest with puppets. Bimini Bon-Boulash wins the mini-challenge. For the main challenge, the queens act in the BBC's newest soap opera, BeastEnders.: Bimini Bon-Boulash plays Scat Slater (based on Kat Slater); Ellie Diamond plays Thot Bottom (based on Dot Cotton); Lawrence Chaney plays Phyllis Bitchell (based on Phil Mitchell); Tayce plays Karen Bitchell (based on Sharon Mitchell); On the runway, category is Panto Dame. Bimini Bon-Boulash and Lawrence Chaney receive positive critiques, with Bimini Bon-Boulash winning the challenge. Ellie Diamond and Tayce receive negative critiques, and are announced as the bottom two. They lip-sync to "Last Thing on My Mind" by Steps. They are both declared the winners of the lip-sync and no one goes home.: Alternating Judge: Graham Norton; Mini-Challenge: Everybody Loves Puppets; Mini-Challenge Winner: Bimini Bon-Boulash; Main Challenge: Act in the BBC's newest soap opera BeastEnders; Runway Theme: Panto Dame; Challenge Winner: Bimini Bon-Boulash; Bottom Two: Ellie Diamond and Tayce; Lip-Sync Song: "Last Thing on My Mind" by Steps; Eliminated: None
18	10	"Grand Finale"	18 March 2021
For the final challenge of the season, the queens write, record and perform their own verse to RuPaul's song "A Little Bit of Love" On the runway, category is Final Four Eleganza Extravaganza. The eliminated queens all return to the runway. Ellie Diamond is eliminated, leaving Bimini Bon-Boulash, Lawrence Chaney and Tayce as the top three queens of the season. They lip-sync to "I'm Still Standing" by Elton John. It is announced that Lawrence Chaney is the winner, leaving Bimini Bon-Boulash and Tayce as the runners-up.: Alternating Judge: Alan Carr and Graham Norton; Main Challenge: Write, record and perform your own verse to RuPaul's song "A Little Bit of Love"; Runway Theme: Final Four Eleganza Extravaganza; Eliminated: Ellie Diamond; Final Three: Bimini Bon-Boulash, Lawrence Chaney and Tayce; Lip-Sync Song: "I'm Still Standing" by Elton John; Runners-up: Bimini Bon-Boulash and Tayce; Winner of RuPaul's Drag Race UK Series Two: Lawrence Chaney
