= Powerhouse, Newcastle upon Tyne =

Gay club in England

Coordinates: 54.96836°N 1.62254°W

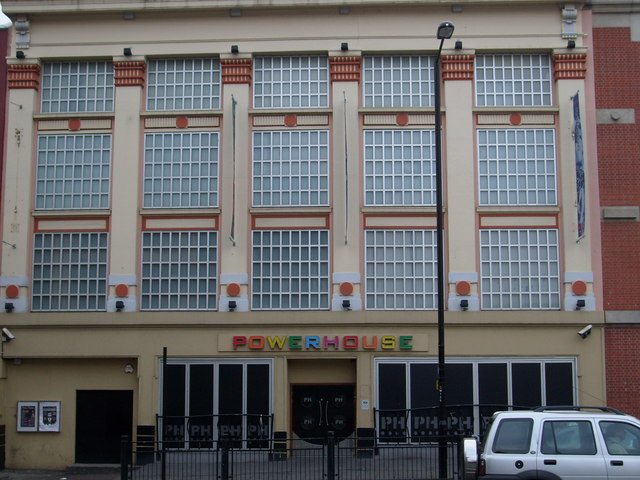
The Powerhouse in 2008

Powerhouse is a gay friendly club and venue in Newcastle upon Tyne, Tyne and Wear, England.

It has been in four separate locations over its history. Originally a basement club on Waterloo Street in the 1980s. In 2008, the club, now on Westmoreland Road, was leased to Pure Leisure Ltd. It is now under new management by Copenhagen 1801.

The club has four floors, which are not always open at the same time. It also has a roof terrace.
