= Baga Chipz =

English drag queen

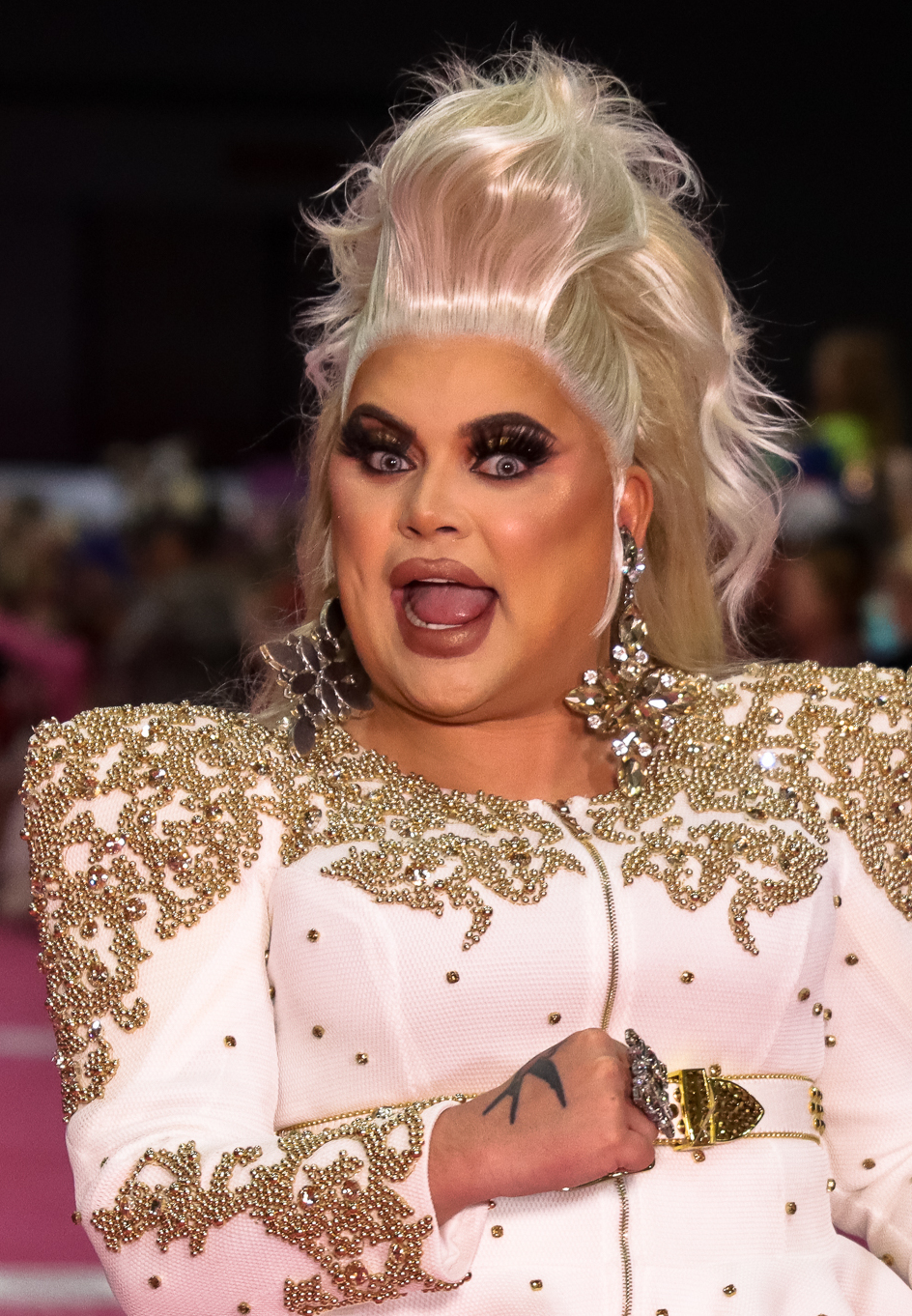
- Baga at RuPaul's DragCon LA, 2023
- Born: Mark Christopher Botfield; 28 November 1989 (age 36); West Bromwich, West Midlands, England
- Occupations: Drag queen; singer; television personality
- Years active: 2014–present
- Television: RuPaul's Drag Race UK (series 1); RuPaul's Drag Race: UK vs. the World (series 1)
- Website: bagachipz.net

Mark Christopher Botfield (born 28 November 1989), better known by the stage name Baga Chipz, is an English drag queen known for competing on the first series of RuPaul's Drag Race UK (2019) and later the first series of RuPaul's Drag Race: UK vs. the World (2022). Baga Chipz also appeared in the fifth series of the Channel 4 school drama series Ackley Bridge (2022).

== Career ==
Baga Chipz is a part of "The Buffalo Girls", a drag troupe also featuring Lady Lloyd and Silver Summers.

In 2014, Baga Chipz appeared in Drag Queens of London, a series documenting the lives of drag queens over a three-month period, both on and off the stage.

On 21 August 2019, Baga Chipz was announced as one of the ten queens to be competing in the first series of RuPaul's Drag Race UK. Baga Chipz won three challenges and finished in third place. During November and December 2019, Baga Chipz and the cast of series one of RuPauls Drag Race UK embarked on a tour hosted by Drag Race alumna Alyssa Edwards. In January 2020, Baga Chipz attended the first ever RuPaul's DragCon UK.

In December 2019, Baga Chipz, alongside fellow RuPaul's Drag Race UK contestant The Vivienne, began starring in Morning T&T on WOW Presents Plus. The show sees The Vivienne and Baga Chipz reprise their Snatch Game impersonations of Donald Trump and Margaret Thatcher, respectively, to host fictional television news show, and consisted of six episodes as of January 2020. At DragCon UK in January 2020 an additional episode was filmed with The Vivienne and Baga Chipz appearing as themselves. Guests on the web series included fellow Drag Race UK alumni Sum Ting Wong as Queen Elizabeth II and Cheryl Hole as Gemma Collins.

In March 2020, Baga Chipz, once again alongside The Vivienne, started presenting the UK version of I Like to Watch, a web series produced by Netflix in which they review Netflix programming.

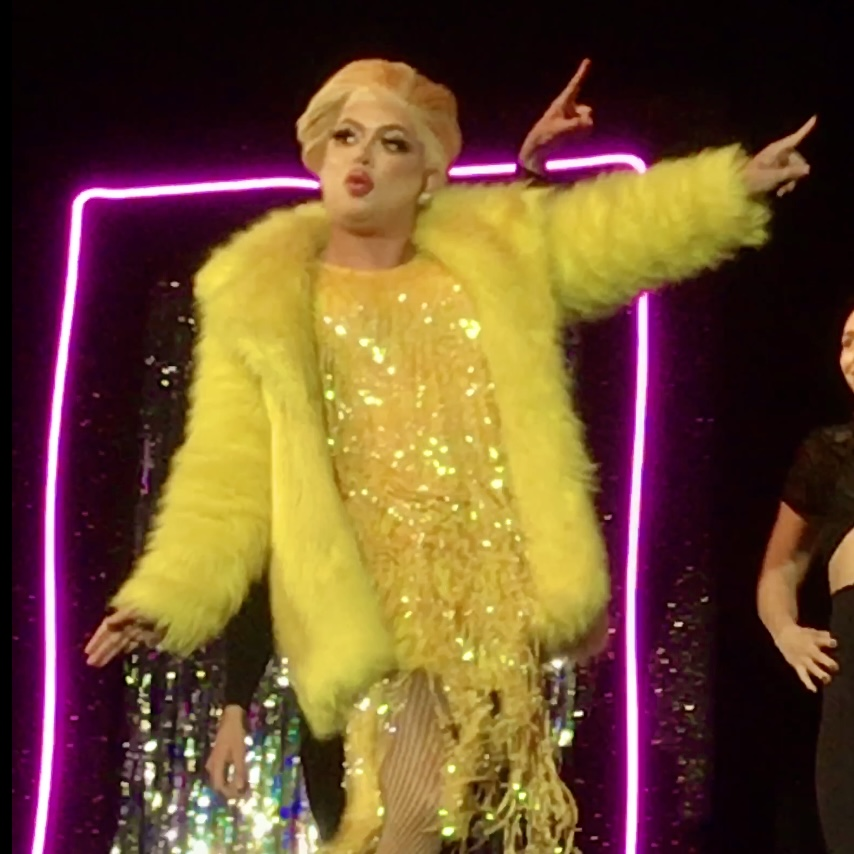
Baga Chipz performing in 2020

Baga Chipz is known for her Amy Winehouse impression.

In July 2020, Baga Chipz appeared on Celebrity Masterchef. On 8 July 2020, Baga Chipz was eliminated from the competition.

In September 2020, Baga Chipz released her debut single titled "When The Sun Goes Down" in collaboration with Saara Aalto. She also appeared on the ITV series Celebrity Karaoke Club which started on 23 September 2020. In 2021, she was cast in the Channel 4 school drama series Ackley Bridge; she appeared in the fifth series in 2022.

Baga Chipz later returned to compete on the first series of RuPaul's Drag Race: UK vs. the World, against competitors from across the Drag Race franchise, including fellow RuPaul's Drag Race UK Series 1 alumni, Blu Hydrangea and Cheryl Hole. During her time in the competition, she placed in the Top 2 in Episode 4 for her Snatch Game impersonation of Kathy Bates (as Annie Wilkes from Misery) and was up for elimination in Episode 5, but made it to the finale. She later went on to lose her lip-sync against Mo Heart from the tenth season of the American franchise in the first round of the finale Lip-Sync for the Crown tournament, ultimately tying for third place with fellow competitor Jujubee.

== Discography ==
=== Studio albums ===
Title	Details
Frock4Life (with Frock Destroyers)	Released: 11 December 2020; Label: PEG; Formats: Digital download

=== Singles ===
Title	Year	Peak chart positions	Album
Title	Year	FIN (Air)	Album
"When the Sun Goes Down" (with Saara Aalto)	2020	100	Non-album single
"Her Majesty" (with Frock Destroyers)	2020	—	FROCK4LIFE
"Big Ben" (with Frock Destroyers)	2020	—	FROCK4LIFE
"A Very Harsh Christmas" (with Kelly Peakman)	2020	—	Non-album single
"Read"	2021	—	Non-album single
"Drag City"	2021	—	Non-album single
"Much Betta"	2022	—	Non-album single
"—" denotes a single that did not chart or was not released in that territory.

=== As featured artist ===
Title	Year	Peak chart positions		Album
Title	Year	UK	US Elec.	Album
"Break Up (Bye Bye)" (The Cast of RuPaul's Drag Race UK)	2019	35	45	Non-album single
"To the Moon" (Cast Version) (RuPaul ft. The Cast of RuPaul's Drag Race UK)	2019	—	—	Non-album single

== Filmography ==
- Dear Viv (2025)

=== Television ===
Year	Title	Role	Notes	Ref
2014	Drag Queens of London	Herself	Main Cast	
2015–2017	London Calling	Herself	Guest	
2019	RuPaul's Drag Race UK	Herself	Contestant (3rd Place); Series 1	
2019	The X Factor: Celebrity	Herself	Guest	
2019	Channel 4's Alternative Election Night	Herself	Guest	
2019	The Big Fat Quiz of the Year	Herself	2019 Edition (Guest)	
2020	CelebAbility	Herself	Guest	
2020	Roast Battle UK	Herself	Guest	
2020	Pointless Celebrities	Herself	Guest	
2020	Celebrity MasterChef	Herself	Contestant	
2020	Celebrity Karaoke Club	Herself	Contestant	
2021	The Celebrity Circle	Herself	Contestant	
2021	RuPaul's Drag Race UK	Herself	Special guest; Series 2	
2021	Brassic	Herself	Drag queen; series 3	
2022	RuPaul's Drag Race: UK vs. the World	Herself	Contestant (3rd Place); Series 1	
2022	Schools	Herself		
2022	Ackley Bridge	Rusty Pipez	Guest role; Series 5	
2022	RuPaul's Drag Race UK	Herself	Special guest; Series 4	
2022	Prince Andrew: The Musical	Margaret Thatcher		

=== Music videos ===
Year	Title	Artist	Ref.
2014	"Don't Rescue Me"	Buffalo Girls	
2015	"You're There"	Jeff Kristian	
2020	"Mask, Glove, Soap, Scrubs"	Todrick Hall	
2020	"Always"	Waze & Odyssey	

=== Web series ===
Year	Title	Role	Notes	Ref
2019–2020	Morning T&T	Margaret Thatcher	World of Wonder original	
2020	I Like to Watch UK	Herself	Netflix UK web series	
2020	God Shave the Queens	Herself	World of Wonder docu-series	
2020	Slag Wars	Herself	Men.com web reality series	
2022	Lazy Generation: Stupid Stunts	Herself	Comedy Central UK web series	
2022	Bring Back My Girls	Herself	World of Wonder original	

=== Theatre ===
Year	Title	Role	Theatre	Ref.
2019	Cinderella	Baroness Baga	Trafalgar Studios	
