= RuPaul's Drag Race UK series 1 =

2019 series of RuPaul's Drag Race UK

RuPaul's Drag Race UK
- Series 1
- Promotional poster for series one
- Hosted by: RuPaul
- Judges: RuPaul; Michelle Visage; Alan Carr; Graham Norton
- No. of contestants: 10
- Winner: The Vivienne
- Runner-up: Divina de Campo
- No. of episodes: 8

Release
- Original network: BBC Three (UK); WOW Presents Plus (International)
- Original release: 3 October – 21 November 2019

Series chronology
- Next → Series 2

The first series of RuPaul's Drag Race UK began airing on 3 October 2019 on the BBC Three section of BBC iPlayer and WOW Presents Plus's WOW Presents Plus streaming service. It ran for eight episodes.

The winner of first series of RuPaul's Drag Race UK was The Vivienne, with Divina de Campo as the runner-up.

The song "Break Up (Bye Bye)", which was featured in the fifth episode, was released as a single and reached number 35 on the UK Singles Chart. It also peaked at number 44 on the Billboard Hot Dance/Electronic Songs chart in the US.

The Vivienne died on 3 January 2025 at the age of 32 due to cardiac arrest.

== Contestants ==
Ages, names, and cities stated are at time of filming.

Contestants of RuPaul's Drag Race UK series 1 and their backgrounds
Contestant	Age	Hometown	Outcome
The Vivienne	26	Liverpool, England	Winner
Divina de Campo	35	Brighouse, England	Runner-up
Baga Chipz	29	East London, England	3rd place
Cheryl Hole (Note: Now known simply as Cheryl.)	25	Chelmsford, England	4th place
Blu Hydrangea	23	Belfast, Northern Ireland	5th place
Crystal	34	East London, England	6th place
Sum Ting Wong	30	Birmingham, England	7th place
Vinegar Strokes	34	North London, England	8th place
Scaredy Kat	19	Cricklade, England	9th place
Gothy Kendoll	21	Leicester, England	10th place

== Contestant progress ==
Legend:

The Vivienne won RuPaul's Drag Race UK series 1.
Divina de Campo was the runner-up.
WIN indicates that the contestant won the challenge.
SAFE indicates that the contestant was declared safe by the judges.
BTM (Bottom) indicates that the contestant was up for elimination.
ELIM (Eliminated) indicates that the contestant was eliminated.
Guest indicates that the contestant returned as a guest.

Contestants progress with placements in each episode
Contestant	Episode							
Contestant	1	2	3	4	5	6	7	8
The Vivienne	WIN	SAFE	SAFE	WIN	BTM	WIN	SAFE	Winner
Divina de Campo	SAFE	SAFE	WIN	SAFE	WIN	SAFE	WIN	Runner-up
Baga Chipz	SAFE	WIN	SAFE	WIN	WIN	SAFE	BTM	Eliminated
Cheryl Hole	SAFE	SAFE	SAFE	SAFE	SAFE	BTM	ELIM	Guest
Blu Hydrangea	SAFE	BTM	SAFE	SAFE	WIN	ELIM		Guest
Crystal	SAFE	SAFE	SAFE	BTM	ELIM			Guest
Sum Ting Wong	SAFE	SAFE	BTM	ELIM				Guest
Vinegar Strokes	BTM	SAFE	ELIM					Guest
Scaredy Kat	SAFE	ELIM						Guest
Gothy Kendoll	ELIM							Guest

== Lip syncs ==
Legend:

The contestant won the Lip Sync for the Crown and was declared the winner of the season.
The contestant was eliminated after their first time in the bottom.
The contestant was eliminated after their second time in the bottom.

Episode	Bottom contestants			Song	Eliminated
1	Gothy Kendoll	vs.	Vinegar Strokes	"New Rules" (Dua Lipa)	Gothy Kendoll
2	Blu Hydrangea	vs.	Scaredy Kat	"Venus" (Bananarama)	Scaredy Kat
3	Sum Ting Wong	vs.	Vinegar Strokes	"Would I Lie to You?" (Eurythmics)	Vinegar Strokes
4	Crystal	vs.	Sum Ting Wong	"Spice Up Your Life" (Spice Girls)	Sum Ting Wong
5	Crystal	vs.	The Vivienne	"Power" (Little Mix)	Crystal
6	Blu Hydrangea	vs.	Cheryl Hole	"Call My Name (Wideboys Remix)" (Cheryl)	Blu Hydrangea
7	Baga Chipz	vs.	Cheryl Hole	"Tears Dry on Their Own" (Amy Winehouse)	Cheryl Hole
Episode	Final contestants			Song	Winner
8	Divina de Campo	vs.	The Vivienne	"I'm Your Man" (Wham!)	The Vivienne

== Guest judges ==
Listed in chronological order:

- Andrew Garfield, actor
- Maisie Williams, actress
- Twiggy, model and fashion designer
- Geri Halliwell, singer
- Jade Thirlwall, singer
- Cheryl, singer, television personality and dancer
- Michaela Coel, actress

=== Special guests ===
Guests who appeared in episodes, but did not judge on the main stage.

Episode 3

- Raven, runner-up of both RuPaul's Drag Race Season 2 and All Stars 1

Episode 4

- Stacey Dooley, investigative journalist
- Lorraine Kelly, television presenter

Episode 5

- MNEK, singer and music producer

Episode 6

- Katya, contestant from RuPaul's Drag Race Season 7, and runner-up of All Stars 2

Episode 8

- AJ Pritchard, professional ballroom dancer
- Curtis Pritchard, professional ballroom dancer

== Episodes ==
No. overall	No. in series	Title	Original release date
1	1	"The Royal Queens"	3 October 2019
Ten queens enter the workroom. For the first mini-challenge, the queens do an "Off with Your Heads" photoshoot. Scaredy Kat wins the mini-challenge. For this week's main challenge, the queens present two looks on the runway: Queen of Your Hometown and a look inspired by Queen Elizabeth II. On the runway, Baga Chipz, Sum Ting Wong, and The Vivienne receive positive critiques, with The Vivienne winning the challenge. Cheryl Hole, Gothy Kendoll, and Vinegar Strokes receive negative critiques, with Cheryl Hole being safe. Gothy Kendoll and Vinegar Strokes lip-sync to "New Rules" by Dua Lipa. Vinegar Strokes wins the lip-sync and Gothy Kendoll is the first queen to sashay away.: Guest Judge: Andrew Garfield; Alternating Judge: Alan Carr; Mini-Challenge: "Off with Your Heads" photoshoot; Mini-Challenge Winner: Scaredy Kat; Main Challenge: Present two looks on the runway; Runway Themes: Queen of Your Hometown and a look inspired by Queen Elizabeth II; Challenge Winner: The Vivienne; Bottom Two: Gothy Kendoll and Vinegar Strokes; Lip-Sync Song: "New Rules" by Dua Lipa; Eliminated: Gothy Kendoll; Farewell Message: "I'm the UK's Porkchop! Love you, friends for life! x x x Gothy"
2	2	"Downton Draggy"	10 October 2019
For this week's main challenge, the queens perform in drag film adaptions of Downton Abbey, called "Downton Draggy".: Team Scaredy Kat: Blu Hydrangea, Cheryl Hole, Crystal, Divina de Campo, and Scaredy Kat; Team The Vivienne: Baga Chipz, Sum Ting Wong, The Vivienne, and Vinegar Strokes; On the runway, category is Bond Girl Glamourama. Team The Vivienne is the winning team, with Baga Chipz winning the challenge. Team Scaredy Kat is the losing team. Blu Hydrangea, Cheryl Hole and Scaredy Kat receive negative critiques, with Cheryl Hole being safe. Blu Hydrangea and Scaredy Kat lip-sync to "Venus" by Bananarama. Blu Hydrangea wins the lip-sync and Scaredy Kat sashays away.: Guest Judge: Maisie Williams; Alternating Judge: Graham Norton; Main Challenge: Perform in drag film adaptations of Downton Abbey, called "Downton Draggy"; Runway Theme: Bond Girl Glamourama; Challenge Winner: Baga Chipz; Bottom Two: Blu Hydrangea and Scaredy Kat; Lip-Sync Song: "Venus" by Bananarama; Eliminated: Scaredy Kat; Farewell Message: "Scaredy the whole way. 19 now, what's gonna happen when I'm 35. :P Thanks girls. Cya later! Meowx"
3	3	"Posh on a Penny"	17 October 2019
For this week's mini-challenge, the queens do some intriguing dance moves around a maypole. Cheryl Hole wins the mini-challenge. For the main challenge, the queens create an outfit made from junk found at a car boot sale. On the runway, Crystal, Divina de Campo, and The Vivienne receive positive critiques, with Divina de Campo winning the challenge. Cheryl Hole, Sum Ting Wong, and Vinegar Strokes receive negative critiques, with Cheryl Hole being safe. Sum Ting Wong and Vinegar Strokes lip-sync to "Would I Lie To You?" by Eurythmics. Sum Ting Wong wins the lip-sync and Vinegar Strokes sashays away.: Guest Judge: Twiggy; Alternating Judge: Graham Norton; Mini-Challenge: Do some intriguing dance moves around a maypole; Mini-Challenge Winner: Cheryl Hole; Main Challenge: Create an outfit made from junk found at a car boot sale; Challenge Winner: Divina de Campo; Bottom Two: Sum Ting Wong and Vinegar Strokes; Lip-Sync Song: "Would I Lie To You?" by Eurythmics; Eliminated: Vinegar Strokes; Farewell Message: "Long live the OG RPDRUK SLAAAAGS! You're all amazing ♥️ Hodge Podge FOREVER! xxx"
4	4	"Snatch Game"	24 October 2019
For this week's main challenge, the queens play the Snatch Game. Lorraine Kelly and Stacey Dooley star as the celebrity contestants. The cast consisted of: Baga Chipz as Margaret Thatcher; Blu Hydrangea as Mary Berry; Cheryl Hole as Gemma Collins; Crystal as Rue McClanahan; Divina de Campo as Julia Child; Sum Ting Wong as Sir David Attenborough; The Vivienne as Donald Trump; On the runway, category is Weird Science. Baga Chipz and The Vivienne receive positive critiques, with both queens winning the challenge. Crystal, Divina de Campo, and Sum Ting Wong receive negative critiques, with Divina de Campo being safe. Crystal and Sum Ting Wong lip-sync to "Spice Up Your Life" by Spice Girls. Crystal wins the lip-sync and Sum Ting Wong sashays away.: Guest Judge: Geri Halliwell; Alternating Judge: Alan Carr; Main Challenge: Snatch Game; Runway Theme: Weird Science; Challenge Winners: Baga Chipz and The Vivienne; Bottom Two: Crystal and Sum Ting Wong; Lip-Sync Song: "Spice Up Your Life" by Spice Girls; Eliminated: Sum Ting Wong; Farewell Message: "Love you ALL! Believe in yourselves more than I believe in me you've got in the bag ♥️ Love you long time xoxo STW"
5	5	"Girl Groups Battle Royale"	31 October 2019
For this week's mini-challenge, the queens read each other to filth. Crystal wins the mini-challenge. For the main challenge, the queens write, record, and perform verses to "Break Up (Bye Bye)".: Team Filth Harmony: Cheryl Hole, Crystal, and The Vivienne; Team The Frock Destroyers: Baga Chipz, Blu Hydrangea, and Divina de Campo; On the runway, category is Day at the Races. Team The Frock Destroyers is the winning team, with Baga Chipz, Blu Hydrangea, and Divina de Campo all winning the challenge. Team Filth Harmony is the losing team. Crystal and The Vivienne receive negative critiques, and are announced as the bottom two. They lip-sync to "Power" by Little Mix. The Vivienne wins the lip-sync and Crystal sashays away.: Guest Judge: Jade Thirlwall; Alternating Judge: Graham Norton; Mini-Challenge: Reading is Fundamental; Mini-Challenge Winner: Crystal; Main Challenge: Write, record, and perform verses to "Break Up (Bye Bye)"; Runway Theme: Day at the Races; Challenge Winners: Baga Chipz, Blu Hydrangea, and Divina de Campo; Bottom Two: Crystal and The Vivienne; Lip-Sync Song: "Power" by Little Mix; Eliminated: Crystal; Farewell Message: "YOU'RE A BUNCH OF UGLY, TALENTLESS LITTLE WITCHES – I'M GOING TO MISS YOU!! X"
6	6	"Thirsty Werk"	7 November 2019
For this week's mini-challenge, the queens play a game of Boxers, Briefs or Commando with the pit crew. Divina de Campo wins the mini-challenge. For the main challenge, the queens campaign, market and design a brand of bottled water. On the runway, category is Rainy Day Eleganza. Divina de Campo and The Vivienne receive positive critiques, with The Vivienne winning the challenge. Baga Chipz, Blu Hydrangea, and Cheryl Hole receive negative critiques, with Baga Chipz being safe. Blu Hydrangea and Cheryl Hole lip-sync to "Call My Name (Wideboys Remix)" by Cheryl. Cheryl Hole wins the lip-sync and Blu Hydrangea sashays away.: Guest Judge: Cheryl; Alternating Judge: Graham Norton; Mini-Challenge: Boxers, Briefs or Commando; Mini-Challenge Winner: Divina de Campo; Mini-Challenge Prize: A video call and insider advice from RuPaul's Drag Race Royalty Katya; Main Challenge: Campaign, market and design a brand of bottled water; Runway Theme: Rainy Day Eleganza; Challenge Winner: The Vivienne; Bottom Two: Blu Hydrangea and Cheryl Hole; Lip-Sync Song: "Call My Name (Wideboys Remix)" by Cheryl; Eliminated: Blu Hydrangea; Farewell Message: "Not just a look Queen! BLU came, BLU slayed, BLU conquered for N.I.♥️ Love you ALL! BLU Hydrangea ♥️"
7	7	"Family That Drags Together"	14 November 2019
For this week's mini-challenge, the queens have a bitchfest with puppets. Divina de Campo wins the mini-challenge. For the main challenge, the queens makeover a family member. On the runway, Divina de Campo and The Vivienne receive positive critiques, with Divina de Campo winning the challenge. Baga Chipz and Cheryl Hole receive negative critiques, and are announced as the bottom two. They lip-sync to "Tears Dry on Their Own" by Amy Winehouse. Baga Chipz wins the lip-sync and Cheryl Hole sashays away.: Guest Judge: Michaela Coel; Alternating Judge: Alan Carr; Mini-Challenge: Everybody Loves Puppets; Mini-Challenge Winner: Divina de Campo; Main Challenge: Makeover a family member; Challenge Winner: Divina de Campo; Bottom Two: Baga Chipz and Cheryl Hole; Lip-Sync Song: "Tears Dry on Their Own" by Amy Winehouse; Eliminated: Cheryl Hole; Farewell Message: "I'm all gamed out! You're finally get rid of me! Kill it top 3 – So Proud! May the best GIRL win XOXO Cheryl Hole ♥"
8	8	"Grand Finale"	21 November 2019
For the final challenge of the season, the queens write, record and perform their own verse to RuPaul's song "Rock It (To The Moon)" On the runway, category is Final Three Eleganza Extravaganza. The eliminated queens all return to the runway. Baga Chipz is eliminated, leaving Divina de Campo and The Vivienne as the top two queens of the season. They lip-sync to "I'm Your Man" by Wham!. It is announced that The Vivienne is the winner, leaving Divina de Campo as the runner-up.: Alternating Judges: Alan Carr and Graham Norton; Main Challenge: Write, record and perform your own verse to RuPaul's song "Rock It (To The Moon)"; Runway Theme: Final Three Eleganza Extravaganza; Eliminated: Baga Chipz; Final Two: Divina De Campo and The Vivienne; Lip-Sync Song: "I'm Your Man" by Wham!; Runner-up: Divina de Campo; Winner of RuPaul's Drag Race UK Series One: The Vivienne

== Reception ==
The series received very positive reviews from critics, with The Guardian describing the series as having "saved RuPaul's Drag Race" as the recent seasons have had a less than positive reception. In their review of the series, iNews awarded the series "five stars" and described it as a "roaring success", despite criticising its omission of a stand-up comedy challenge.

In a more critical review, Vulture stated in its review of the finale that although the season "may have hit some true highs... it couldn’t save Drag Race from its worst impulses".
