= Blu Hydrangea =

Northern Irish drag performer (born 1996)

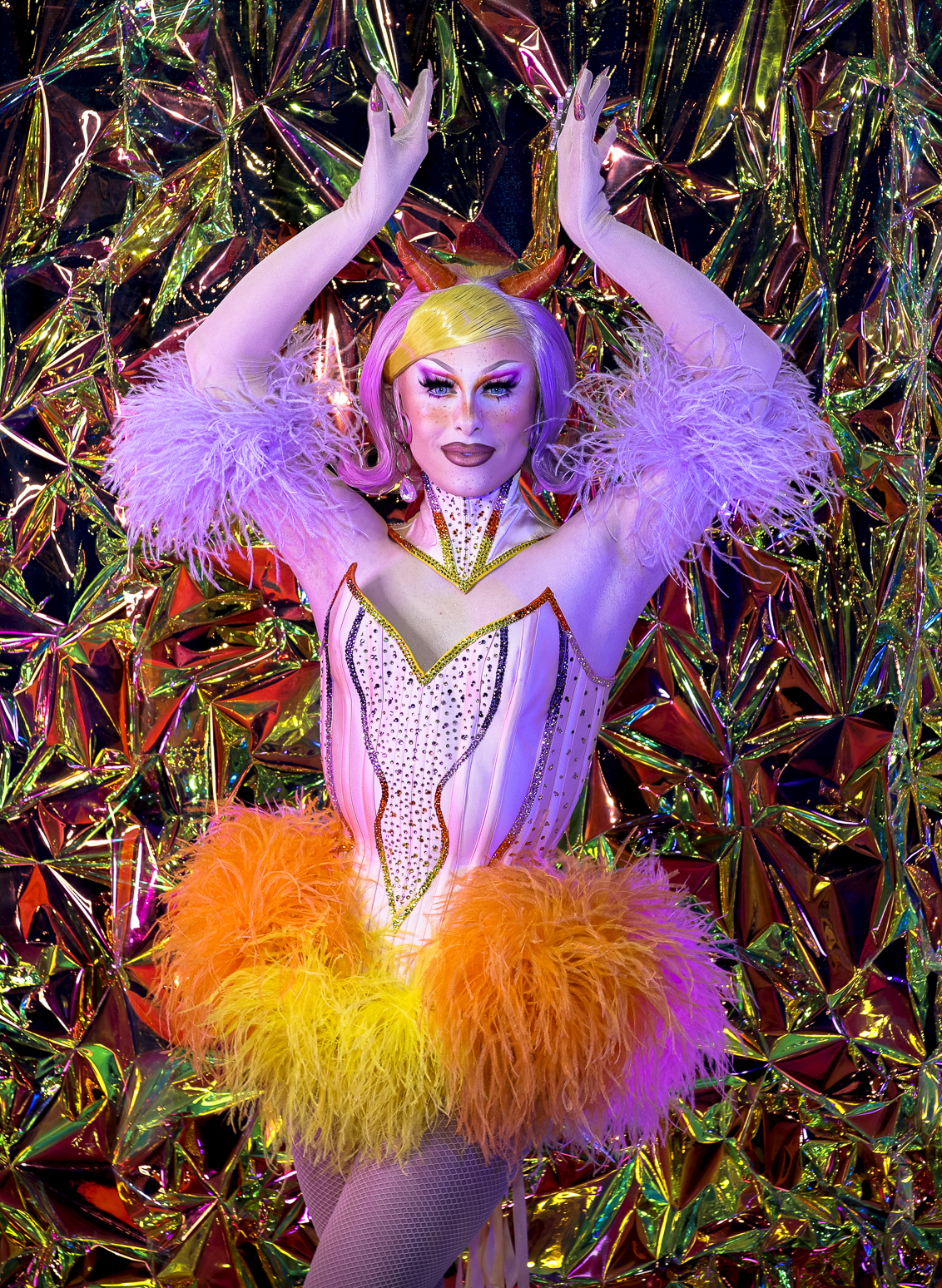
- Hydrangea in 2022
- Born: Joshua Cargill; 15 February 1996 (age 30); Belfast, Northern Ireland
- Occupation: Drag queen
- Television: RuPaul's Drag Race UK (series 1); RuPaul's Drag Race: UK vs. the World (series 1)
- Website: www.bluhydrangea.com

Blu Hydrangea (born 15 February 1996) is the stage name of Joshua Cargill, a Northern Irish drag queen from Belfast who competed the first series of RuPaul's Drag Race UK in 2019, and won the first series of RuPaul's Drag Race: UK vs. the World in 2022.

== Career ==
Blu Hydrangea was announced as part of the cast of the first series of RuPaul's Drag Race UK on 21 September 2019 and subsequently finished in fifth place on the series, losing the lip sync to fellow contestant Cheryl Hole.

Outside of Drag Race, Blu Hydrangea is a make-up queen and a part of a group called the Frock Destroyers (with Baga Chipz and Divina de Campo). She also hosted the BBC web series Strictly Frocked Up, a weekly web series where she and another drag queen watch and review each episode of Strictly Come Dancing.

In January 2022, she was announced as one of the nine contestants on the first series of RuPaul's Drag Race: UK vs. the World. On 8 March 2022, Blu Hydrangea was announced as the winner of the series, becoming the first Northern Irish queen to win across the franchise. In December 2023, she was announced as competing on the seventh season of the Irish version of Dancing with the Stars, premiering in January 2024, where she finished as runner-up. She broke the record of receiving the most perfect scores in any series, with 5, and the most 10s of any contestant (along with Aoibhín Garrihy and Nina Carberry), with 18.

== Personal life ==
Cargill grew up in Royal Hillsborough but later moved to live in Belfast. He has dated Johnson Orr since 2014, becoming engaged in December 2023.

== Filmography ==
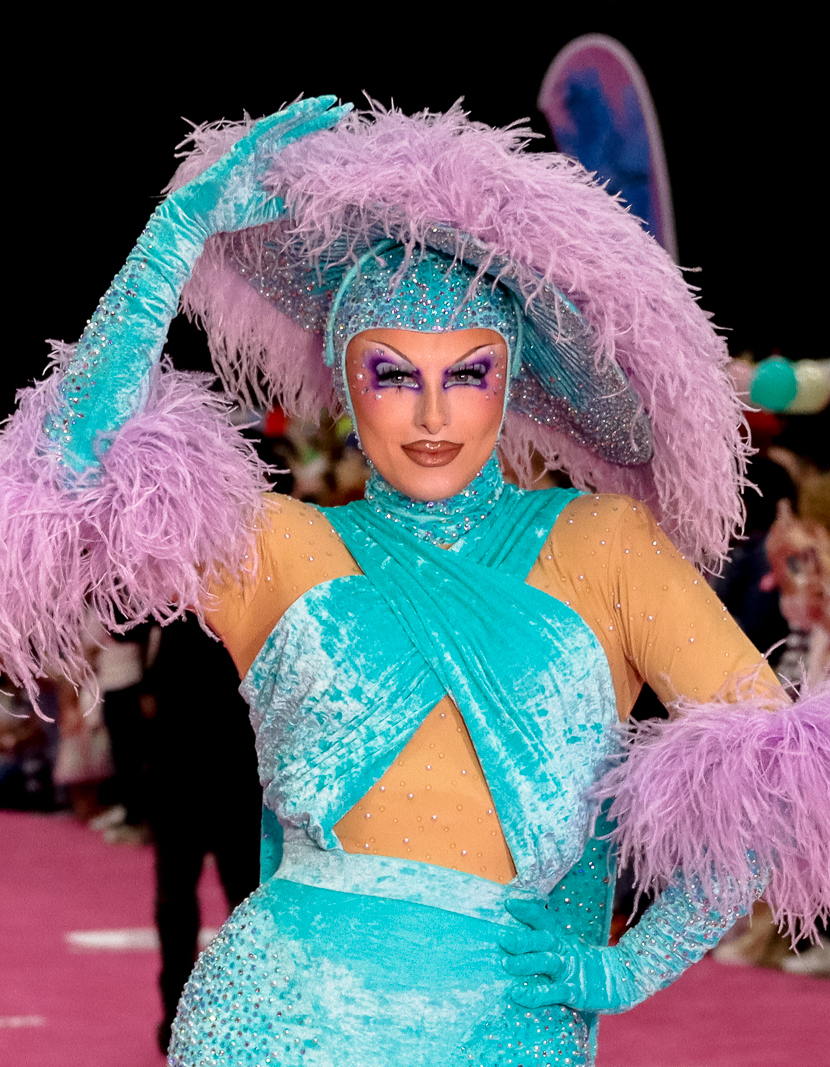
At RuPaul's DragCon LA in 2023

=== Television ===
Year	Title	Role	Notes
2019	RuPaul's Drag Race UK	Herself	Contestant (5th Place); Series 1
2021–2022	Stitch, Please!	Herself	Host
2021	Be Here, Be Queer	Herself	Netflix special
2022	RuPaul's Drag Race: UK vs. the World	Herself	Contestant (Winner); Series 1
2022	Queens for the Night	Mentor	One-off special
2023	RuPaul's Drag Race UK	Herself	Special guest; Series 5
2023	Mwy Na Daffs a Taffs	Herself	Episode 6
2024	Dancing with the Stars	Herself	Contestant (Runner-up); Series 7
2024	Wreak	Drag Queen	
2024	Celeb Cooking School	Herself	Contestant (Winner)
2024	RuPaul's Drag Race: UK vs. the World	Herself	Special guest; Series 2
2026	Dancing with the Stars	Herself	All-Star mentor; Series 9

=== Web ===
Year	Title	Role	Notes
2020	God Shave the Queens	Herself	Produced by World of Wonder
2020	Strictly Frocked Up	Herself (Host)	BBC iPlayer
2020	The X Change Rate	Herself	Produced by BUILD Series
2020	Strictly Frocked Up!	Herself	Produced by BBC Three
2020	Cosmo Queens UK	Herself	Produced by Cosmopolitan UK
2021	I Like to Watch UK	Herself	Produced by Netflix
2022	Frockumentary	Herself	WOWPresents+ Original
2022	EW News Flash	Herself	Produced by Entertainment Weekly
2022	Drag Us Weekly	Herself	Produced by Us Weekly
2022	Bestie Test	Herself	With Cheryl Hole, Produced by Glamour Magazine UK
2022	Bring Back My Girls	Herself	Produced by World of Wonder
2023	Binge Queens: UK5	Herself (Host)	With Cheryl Hole, Produced by World of Wonder

- Tongue Thai'd (2024)

=== Music videos ===
Year	Title	Artist	Ref.
2020	"Always"	Waze & Odyssey	
2020	"Her Majesty"	Frock Destroyers (Herself, Baga Chipz & Divina de Campo)	
2021	"My House"	Jodie Harsh	

== Discography ==
=== Singles ===
==== As lead artist ====
Year	Song	Album
2022	"Champion (Ru x Blu)" (with RuPaul)	Non-album single

==== As featured artist ====
Title	Year	Peak chart positions		Album
Title	Year	UK	US Elec.	Album
"Break Up (Bye Bye)" (RuPaul featuring the cast of RuPaul's Drag Race UK, season 1)	2019	35	45	Non-album single
"Living My Life in London" (Cast Version) (RuPaul featuring the cast of RuPaul's Drag Race UK vs. The World, season 1)	2022	–	–	Non-album single

=== With the Frock Destroyers ===
- Frock4Life (2020)
