= Divina de Campo =

English drag queen

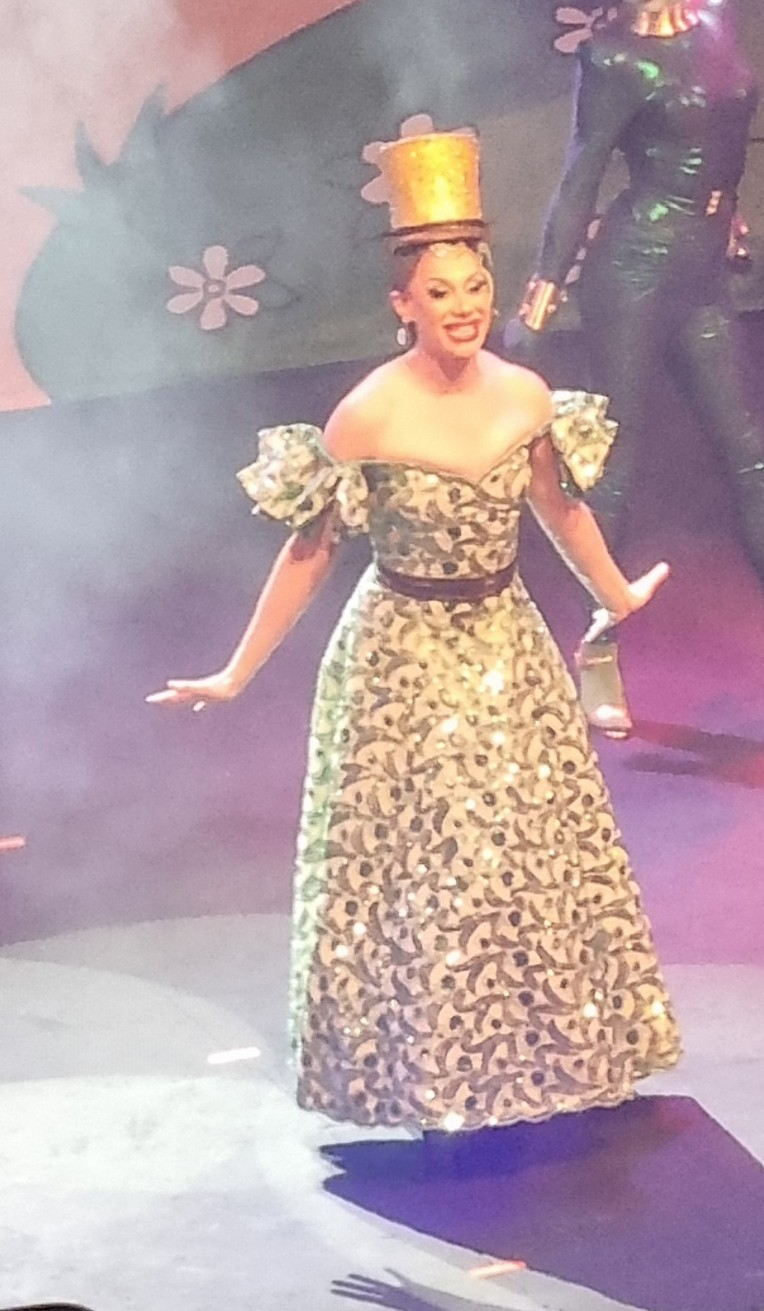
- Divina de Campo in Northampton 2025
- Born: Owen Richard Farrow; Brighouse, West Yorkshire, England
- Education: Manchester Metropolitan University (BA)
- Occupations: Drag queen, singer, actor
- Television: The Voice UK (2016); All Together Now (2018–2019); RuPaul's Drag Race UK (series 1) (2019)
- Website: www.divinadecampo.com

Owen Richard Farrow, known professionally as Divina de Campo, is an English drag queen, singer, and actor, best known for competing in the first series of RuPaul's Drag Race UK, eventually finishing as runner-up.

== Early life ==
Growing up, Farrow struggled with their sexuality and had difficulties at school. After finishing their university degree, they met their husband who encouraged them to do drag.

== Career ==
Farrow started drag in 2005. Their drag name is Italian for Divine, whom de Campo cites as huge inspiration to them. They regularly performed at Kiki in Manchester's Gay Village, before it closed in 2020.

In January 2016, de Campo appeared on The Voice, auditioning with the song "Poor Wandering One" from The Pirates of Penzance, one of the judges being her idol Boy George. Despite none of the judges turning their chairs for de Campo's performance, George later expressed regret for not picking de Campo. In December 2016, de Campo starred in The Ruby Slippers, a play that explores issues of identity and prejudice in the LGBT community.

In 2017, de Campo was a part of a campaign to support the George House Trust, a charity supporting people living with HIV. In December 2017, de Campo hosted Superbia's Drag Queen Story Time, in which she read stories to young children. In 2018, de Campo was featured as a judge on All Together Now. In February 2018, she starred in a production of Dancing Bear, a musical that explores faith, sexuality and gender identity.

On 21 August 2019, de Campo was announced as one of the 10 queens to be competing in the first series of RuPaul's Drag Race UK. From November to December 2019, de Campo toured the UK alongside the cast of series one of RuPaul's Drag Race UK, hosted by Drag Race alum Alyssa Edwards. De Campo won three challenges and finished as the first runner-up. In January 2020, de Campo attended the first ever RuPaul's DragCon UK.

In 2020, de Campo headlined at Portsmouth Pride at Castle Field, Southsea.

In March 2020, amid the coronavirus pandemic, de Campo was announced as a featured cast member for the very first Digital Drag Fest, an online drag festival for all ages, with attendees given opportunities to interact with the artists, tip them, and win prizes during the broadcast. She returned the following year for the second annual Digital Drag Fest, in May 2021. In May, they participated in Isolation Song Contest, representing Australia.

In March 2021, de Campo appeared at Turn On Fest, a virtual Manchester-based LGBTQ performing arts festival. In April, they made an appearance in Dukes Lancaster and the Lawrence Batley Theatre's digital revival of The Importance of Being Earnest. In May, they were a featured performer at The Parking Lot Social Easter Panto, a drive-in show.

Since, they have starred in the 2021/2022 UK Tour of the musical Chicago as Mary Sunshine.

In May 2022, de Campo portrayed the voice of Popcorn Reilly in Alaska's Drag: The Musical (Studio Cast Recording), a studio recording of a planned stage production about two rival drag bars that go head-to-head while struggling through financial troubles.

In October 2022, de Campo won Best Performance in a Musical at UK Theatre Awards for Hedwig and the Angry Inch, a Leeds Playhouse and HOME co-production.

They hosted The Stage Debut Awards ceremony in 2023 and 2024.

== Personal life ==
De Campo is non-binary, and uses all pronouns.

== Discography ==
=== Studio albums ===
| Title | Details |
|---|---|
| Frock4Life (with Frock Destroyers) | Released: 11 December 2020; Label: PEG; Formats: Digital download |

=== Extended plays ===
| Title | Details |
|---|---|
| Decoded | Released: 29 November 2019; Label: PEG; Formats: Vinyl, digital download |
| Red & Silver | Released: 20 November 2020; Label: PEG; Formats: Digital download |

=== Singles ===
==== As lead artist ====
| Year | Song | Album |
|---|---|---|
| 2019 | "A Drag Race Song" | Decoded |
| 2020 | "Gratify" | Decoded |
| 2020 | "Her Majesty" (with Frock Destroyers) | FROCK4LIFE |
| 2020 | "Big Ben" (with Frock Destroyers) | FROCK4LIFE |
| 2021 | "Switch" (with Gothy Kendoll & Forbid) | Non-album single |

==== As featured artist ====
| Title | Year | Peak chart positions | | Album |
| Title | Year | UK | US Elec. | Album |
|---|---|---|---|---|
| "Break Up (Bye Bye)" (The Cast of RuPaul's Drag Race UK) | 2019 | 35 | 45 | Non-album single |
| "To the Moon" (Cast Version) (RuPaul ft. The Cast of RuPaul's Drag Race UK) | 2019 | — | — | Non-album single |

== Filmography ==
=== Film ===
| Year | Title | Role | Notes |
|---|---|---|---|
| 2015 | Alphabet Club | Drag Queen/Dancer/Vocalist | Short film |
| 2022 | Frockumentary | Herself | WOWPresents+ Original |
| 2024 | Dragfox | Ginger Snap (singing voice) | Stop motion film |

=== Television ===
| Year | Title | Role | Notes |
|---|---|---|---|
| 2016 | The Voice UK | Herself | Performer |
| 2018–2019 | All Together Now | Herself | Judge |
| 2019 | 8 Out of 10 Cats | Herself | Guest |
| 2019 | RuPaul's Drag Race UK | Herself | Contestant (Runner-up); Series 1 |
| 2021 | The Big Questions | Herself | Guest |
| 2021 | Brassic | Herself | Guest drag queen |
| 2021 | Children in Need 2021 | Herself | Guest appearance |

=== Radio ===
| Year | Title | Role | Broadcaster | Ref. |
|---|---|---|---|---|
| 2023 | The Life & Work of Veronica St Claude | Veronica | BBC Radio 4 Extra | article |

=== Web Series ===
| Year | Title | Role | Notes | Ref. |
|---|---|---|---|---|
| 2015 | After Show | Herself | Alaska Thunderfuck series | |
| 2017 | With Divina DeCampo | Herself | 18 episodes | |
| 2019 | Spin the Drill | Herself | Guest; Episode 3 | |
| 2020 | Cosmo Queens | Herself | Guest appearance | |
| 2020 | God Shave the Queens | Herself | World of Wonder docu-series | |
| 2020 | Strictly Frocked Up! | Herself | Guest | |
| 2021 | Losing is the New Winning | Herself | Guest | |

=== Music videos ===
| Year | Artist | Title | Director | Ref. |
|---|---|---|---|---|
| 2019 | Herself | "A Drag Race Song" | Erix Arocha | |
| 2020 | Scaredy Kat | "Gasoline" | Scaredy Kat | |
| 2020 | Groove Armada | "Get Out on the Dancefloor" | MrMr | |
| 2020 | Waze & Odyssey | "Always" | Unknown | |
| 2020 | Herself | "Gratify" | Unknown | |
| 2021 | Jodie Harsh | "My House" | Unknown | |

=== Theatre ===
| Year | Title | Role | Theatre | Ref. |
|---|---|---|---|---|
| 2018 | Dancing Bear | Drag Queen/Dancer/Vocalist | The Palace Theatre | |
| 2020 | Sinderella (UK Tour) | Wicked Stepmother | Various venues | |
| 2021–2022 | Chicago | Mary Sunshine | Various venues | |
| 2021 | Sleeping Beauty | Carabosse | The Core at Corby Cube | |
| 2022 | Hedwig and the Angry Inch | Hedwig | Leeds Playhouse | |
| 2022 | Christmas Panto: Jack and the Beanstalk (UK) | The Spirit of the Beans | Bradford's Alhambra Theatre | |
| 2023 | Adult Panto: The Little Mermaid (UK) | Ariel | Various venues | |
| 2023 | The SpongeBob Musical (UK) | Sheldon J. Plankton | Various venues | |
| 2025 | Adult Panto: The Wizard of Oz (UK) | Wizard | Various venues | |
| 2026 | Ride the Cyclone | The Amazing Karnak | Southwark Playhouse Elephant | |
