= Rats: The Rusical =

- RuPaul's Drag Race UK episode
- Episode no.: Series 2 Episode 2
- Directed by: Tony Grech-Smith
- Written by: Christian Manley
- Original air date: 21 January 2021

Guest appearance
- Sheridan Smith

Episode chronology
← Previous "Royalty Returns"	Next → "Who Wore It Best?"

"Rats: The Rusical" is the second episode of the second series of the British television show RuPaul's Drag Race UK. It originally aired on 21 January 2021 and sees contestants perform in the show's first musical theatre challenge, known within the Drag Race franchise as a Rusical, which is also the franchise's first live Rusical. The main challenge tasks the contestants with acting and singing live in a parody of Cats.

English actress Sheridan Smith is a guest judge, and Veronica Green wins the episode's challenge. Cherry Valentine and Tayce place in the bottom two, and as such must enter into a lip sync battle to "Memory" by Elaine Paige. Cherry Valentine loses and is eliminated from the competition.

== Episode ==
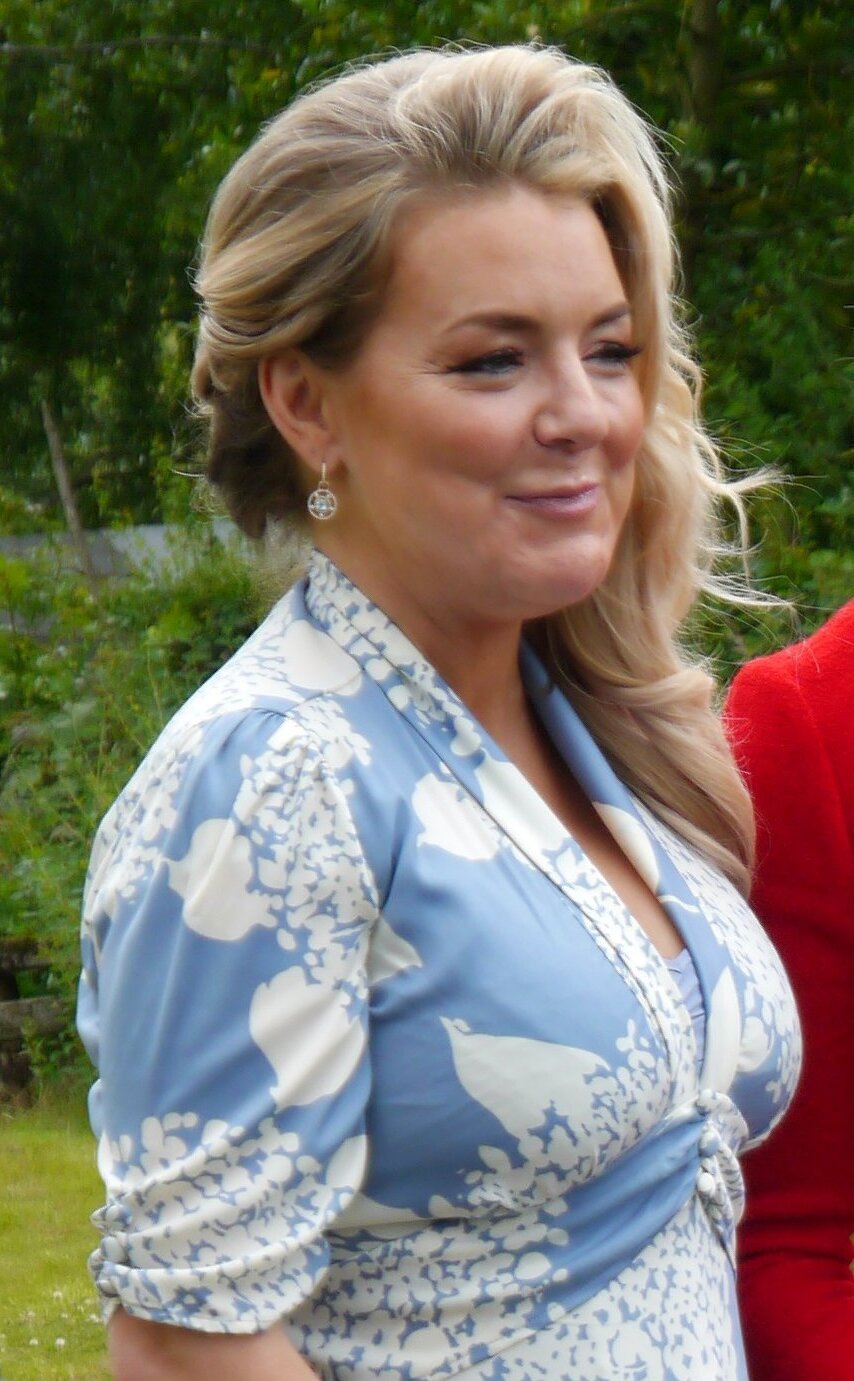
Sheridan Smith is a guest judge

The remaining contestants return to the Werk Room following Joe Black's elimination from the competition. On a new day, RuPaul greets the contestants and reveals the mini-challenge, which tasks contestants with electing a Drag Race cabinet in the categories "Secretary of Shade" (most shady), "Trade Minister" (most attractive out of drag), "Leader of the House of Loading It Up" (most cocky), and "Baroness Basic" (most basic). A'Whora, Tayce, Lawrence Chaney, and Tia Kofi win in the respective categories.

For the main challenge, the contestants are tasked with acting and singing live in a Cats-inspired Rusical (musical theatre challenge) called Rats: The Rusical. For being voted "Baroness Basic", Tia Kofi gets to assign the roles. There is some friction about the roles between Cherry Valentine and Veronica Green. Following are the contestants and roles:

- Asttina Mandella plays Jane
- A'Whora plays Miss Dysentery
- Bimini Bon-Boulash plays Depravity
- Cherry Valentine, Lawrence Chaney, and Sister Sister play The Rat Pack
- Ellie Diamond plays Scabies
- Ginny Lemon plays Dame Doody Stench
- Tayce plays Scat Rat
- Tia Kofi plays Specimen One
- Veronica Green plays Evita von Fleas

On the main stage, the contestants work with judge Michelle Visage and vocal coach Dane Chalfin who offer vocal coaching. The contestants then rehearse choreography with Jay Revell and Kieran Daley Ward. Lawrence Chaney gets emotional, feeling out of their comfort zone. Back in the Werk Room, the contestants get ready for the Rusical and the fashion show. A'Whora and Tayce discuss their mini-challenge votes. Cherry Valentine talks about being raised in the Traveller community and struggling with having pride.

On the main stage, RuPaul welcomes fellow panelists Visage and Alan Carr, as well as guest judge Sheridan Smith. The runway category is "Surprise, Surprise". The contestants perform the Rusical. Following the fashion show, Ellie Diamond, Tia Kofi, and Veronica Green receive positive critiques, and Veronica Green is declared the winner. Cherry Valentine, Lawrence Chaney, and Tayce receive negative critiques, and Lawrence Chaney is deemed safe. Cherry Valentine and Tayce placed in the bottom two and face off in a lip-sync contest to "Memory" by Elaine Paige. Tayce wins the lip-sync, eliminating Cherry Valentine from the competition.

== Production ==
The episode was directed by Tony Grech-Smith and originally aired on 21 January 2021. It has the show's first Rusical, which is also the Drag Race franchise's first Rusical in which contestants sing live.

In an interview with Grazia, Tayce said, "I thought I'd smash the Rats: The Rusical challenge because it was all about performing, which is what I do, so it was definitely humbling when it didn't go so well and I had to lip-sync."

=== Fashion ===
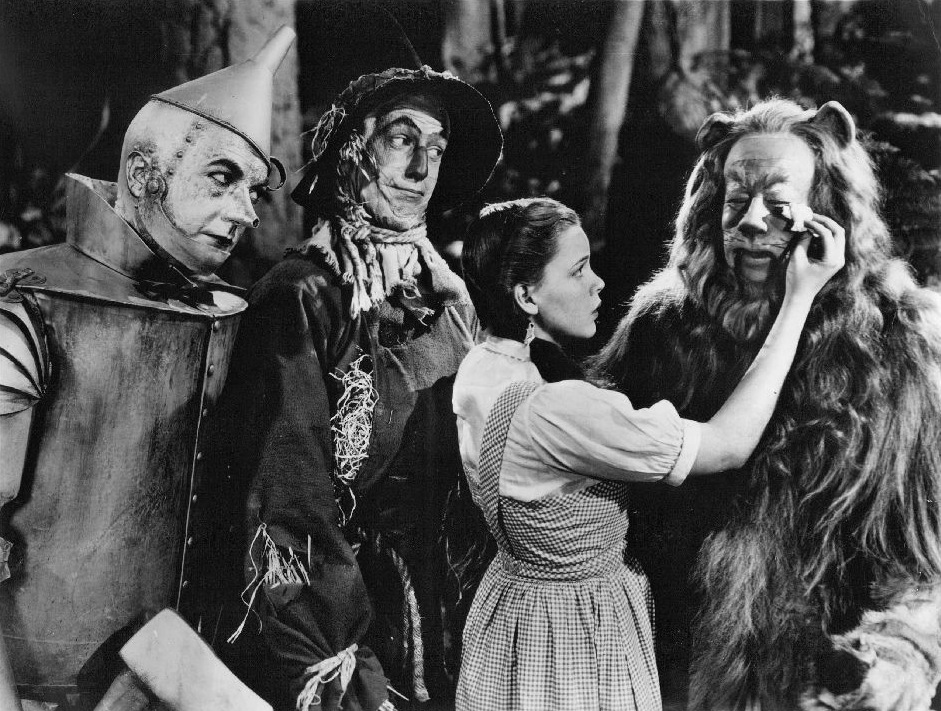
Elie Diamond presented looks inspired by three male characters from The Wizard of Oz; pictured is a publicity photo of American entertainers (left to right) Jack Haley as the Tin Woodman, Ray Bolger as the Scarecrow, Judy Garland as Dorothy Gale, and Bert Lahr as the Cowardly Lion, promoting the 1966 CBS broadcast of the 1939 MGM feature film.

Kevin O'Keefe of Xtra Magazine liked the judge's outfits, highlighting Michelle Visage's pigtails, Alan Carr's jacket, and Ru's dress and wig.

For the fashion show, the contestants are tasked with presenting looks with "reveals". A'Whora wears a black-and-white suit that turns into a wedding dress. Lawrence Chaney's blue outfit turns into a tartan-patterned dress. Ginny Lemon presents a 1960s-inspired outfit and yellow crocs. When she turns around, her buttocks is exposed. Inspired by gender reveal parties, Cherry Valentine wears a yellow polka dot dress and carries a large black balloon. She pops the ballon, releasing confetti. Tia Kofi's first look features a leather harness over illustrated body hair and muscles. Her outfit coverts into a red dress.

Elie Diamond presents a series of three Wizard of Oz-inspired looks, starting with the Scarecrow, followed by the Tin Woodman, then the Cowardly Lion. Asttina Mandella wears a black outfit that becomes a ninja-inspired look, reminiscent of the Mortal Kombat character Mileena. She carries a pair of sai. Sister Sister presents a "magic of suburbia" look and carries a long stem rose. She then reveals a red-colored dominatrix-inspired outfit.

Veronica Green carries cookies on a sheet pan. She drops the pan and transforms into a gold-colored robot reminiscent of the Star Wars character C-3PO. Tayce reveals a series of red outfits and wears a long blonde wig. Her makeup gives the illusion of blood splattered across her face. Bimini Bon-Boulash's outfit is a corset made of canvas, as well as black latex stockings and gloves. She pops several black balloons attached to her outfit.

== Reception and legacy ==
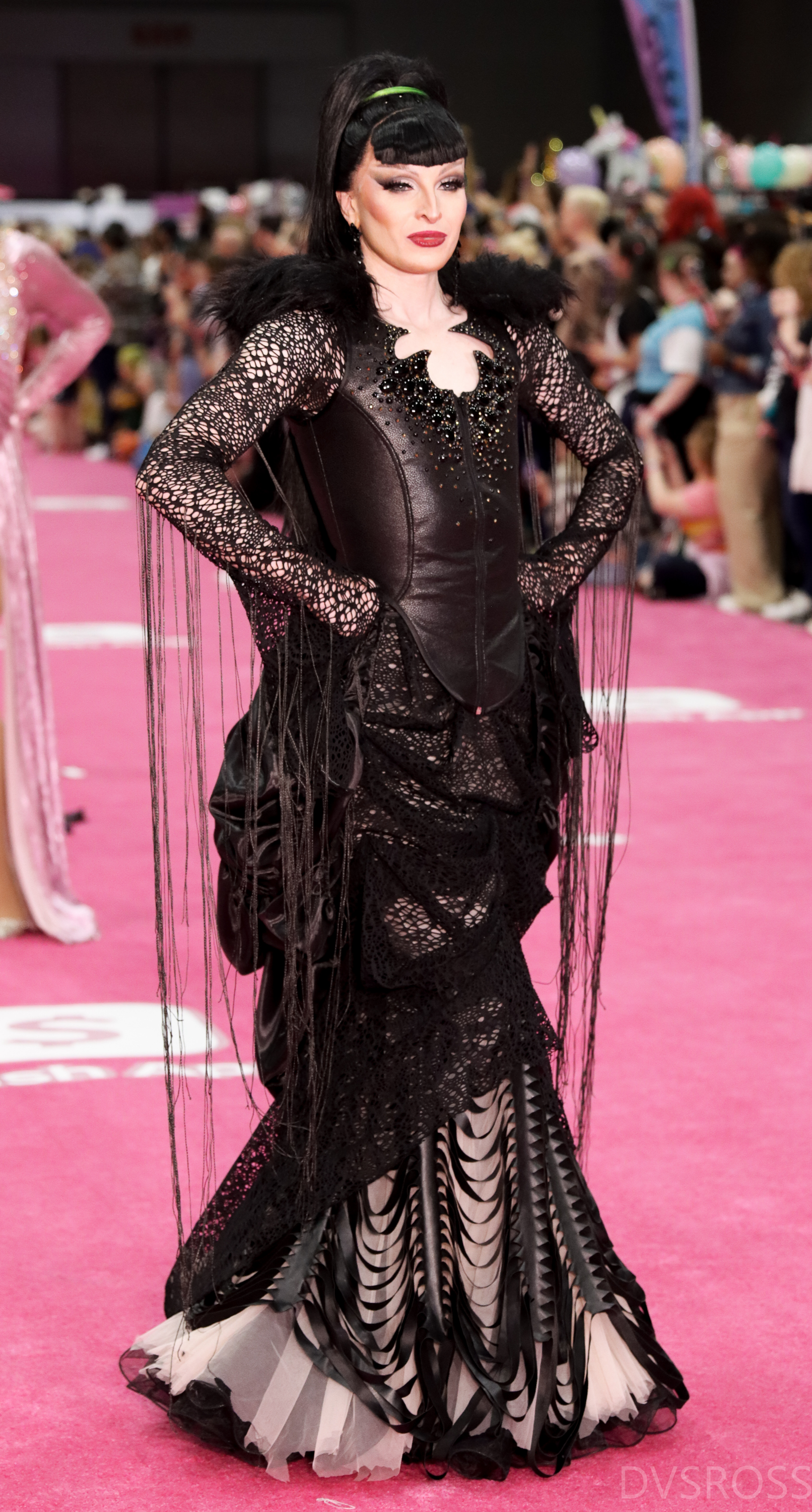
Veronica Green (pictured in 2023) wins the episode's main challenge

Brian Moylan of Vulture rated the episode three out of five stars. The website's Barry Levitt ranked Rats number 17 in a list of Rusicals and wrote, "Rusicals typically struggle with large casts, but 11 queens work well for this unhinged take on Cats. It's got the stuff that makes the live Rusicals so much more exciting, from flubbed lines to surprising and stunning vocals that keep the entertainment value high. Rats is silly and stupid enough to be even better than the musical it's parodying — though that's a very low bar. It might not make any sense, but it's performed with such spirit that you simply don't mind." Shon Faye of Dazed called the episode a "truly unhinged spectacle with no narrative coherence".

The Queerness said Rats "turned out to be a real treat". Raven Smith of Vogue said, "I will pay to see Rats ... on Broadway." In Vice's overview of the show's best moments, Emma Garland said, "When you mix socialist vegan queens with Elizabeth Hurley, Dawn French and an amateur broadway production called 'Rats the Rusical', there really is nowhere for it to go but up." The magazine's Lauren O'Neill said, "it's easy to forget that this is a show that dared to put something called 'Rats: The Rusical' in front of the eyes of people who had barely left the house in a year. Seeing Veronica Green ... appear as a sexy rat with babies – doubling as nipple tassels – suckling at her teats was the moment I knew Drag Race UK Season 2 would be a moment in cultural history". Brett White of Decider said Rats was "quite possibly the most fever-dreamy of any Rusical ever" and wrote: "There were poop puns aplenty, rat baby pasties swinging around on six rat nipples, and Tia even had a human ear growing out of her back. I think it’s safe to say that, somehow, this episode matched the Cats movie in terms of WTF-ery."

Bernardo Sim of Screen Rant said Bimini "[served] a lot of personality" in the musical. The website's Zach Elborough included Rats in a list of the ten "wildest" Drag Race challenges. Out magazine said Bimini "had a bit of a comeback" in the Rusical. HuffPost's Daniel Welsh said Tia Kofi "[dazzled]" in the Rusical. In 2024, Sara Baalla of Digital Spy called Tia Kofi's performance "memorable" and said it "[established] her as a fan-favourite queen". Reiss Smith of PinkNews called Asttina Mandella's performance impressive. Drag Race UK contestant Ginger Johnson has said Rats "is one of those weird rabbit holes that Drag Race falls down where it almost becomes Dadaism. It becomes so surreal and ridiculous that you can’t help but smile when you watch it". Banksie said she "definitely enjoyed every minute of it".

=== "Memory" ===
Writing for Out, Sim said Tayce "delivered an iconic and haunting performance" and Sam Damshenas of Gay Times described her as a "jaw-droppingly stun" during the episode. Damshenas added that her version of the Cats showtune received great praise on social media, and left the judges, in particular Sheridan Smith, in tears.

After the episode aired, Tayce released a solo performance of "Memory". In 2022, following the death of Cherry Valentine, Tayce recreated her performance of "Memory" as a tribute. It was filmed in Cardiff and shared on social media. Bernardo Sim of Out said the tribute "felt particularly poignant given the history she shared with Valentine on screen". Paige said she was moved by Tayce's tribute. In 2025, the website's Marcus Wratten said "Memory" was the season's best lip-sync.
