= Cherry Valentine =

British drag performer (1993–2022)

- Cherry Valentine in 2022
- Born: George Ward; 30 November 1993; Darlington, County Durham, England
- Died: 18 September 2022 (aged 28); Hornsey, London, England
- Education: University of Cumbria (BSc)
- Occupations: Drag queen; mental health nurse
- Television: RuPaul's Drag Race UK; series 2; Cherry Valentine: Gypsy Queen and Proud

George Ward (30 November 1993 – 18 September 2022), better known by the stage name Cherry Valentine, was an English drag queen and mental health nurse who competed in the second series of the television show RuPaul's Drag Race UK. Raised in a Romanichal community, Ward has been credited as the first contestant on the Drag Race franchise to acknowledge his Romani heritage. In 2022, he addressed his background in the BBC documentary film Cherry Valentine: Gypsy Queen and Proud, and in an episode of the documentary series God Shave the Queens. Following Ward's suicide in 2022, a memorial concert and fundraiser was held at London's Clapham Grand.

== Early life and education ==
George Ward was born on 30 November 1993 in Darlington, County Durham, in the north-east of England; he grew up in an English Traveller community in Darlington. As his father had done, he was expected to develop a career as a mechanic.

Ward was raised in a strict environment in which drag was not considered normal. He came out to his parents by writing a letter before leaving home for a week, after which his parents individually took him for a drive and talked but did not discuss his sexual orientation after that incident. He said of his early life: "Growing up [being gay] did affect me. I don't think I was completely sane at all."

Ward was the first member of his family to attend university, studying mental health nursing at the University of Cumbria, during which time he was introduced to Manchester's drag scene.

== Career ==
Ward qualified as a mental health nurse in 2015. He began performing as Cherry Valentine in 2016, while still working in a children's psychiatric intensive-care unit and with adults with Huntington's disease. Ward chose the stage name "Cherry Valentine" for his drag alter ego, after considering several options. The name was inspired by cherry-scented bath wash and his grandmother's liking for sherry. According to The Economic Times, "Valentine" was added because of his fondness for Valentine's Day.

In December 2020, Cherry Valentine was announced as one of twelve contestants in the second series of RuPaul's Drag Race UK. In an interview for the show, she said working as a nurse "has put me in that right position where I'm able to understand people a bit more, and if you're a drag queen, you're working with people. By understanding people, you're going the extra mile". Cherry Valentine failed to impress judges with her performance in the second episode's Rusical. By placing in the bottom two, she had to lip-sync to "Memory" by Elaine Paige from the musical Cats (1981) against Tayce. Cherry Valentine lost the lip-sync and was eliminated from the competition, placing twelfth.

When filming for the show was halted during the COVID-19 pandemic, Ward returned to work in the National Health Service (NHS) to assist in relief efforts and the UK's deployment of vaccines. In "Queens on Lockdown", a special episode of the series that explores the contestants' lives during the COVID-19 pandemic, Cherry Valentine discussed returning to work in the NHS.

Alongside fellow eliminated contestants Joe Black and Asttina Mandella, she appeared in the fifth episode—the first to be filmed post-lockdown—"The RuRuvision Song Contest" for a chance to return to the competition and replace Veronica Green, who was forced to withdraw after testing positive for COVID-19. The remaining contestants voted for Joe Black to return. All contestants appeared in the final episode to perform to RuPaul's song "A Little Bit of Love" (1997). Cherry Valentine's last appearance on the series was in the grand finale alongside the entire cast. Sam Damshenas of Gay Times said her run on the show was "short-lived" but "the star won the hearts of viewers with her fierce aesthetic and charismatic confessionals, as well as her inspiring journey from traveller to drag superstar".

Following Drag Race UK, Cherry Valentine released the dance-pop tracks "Aesthetic" and "Iconic" as singles in 2021. She also appeared in music videos for "My House" by Jodie Harsh, and "Good Ones" by Charli XCX in 2021. In February 2022, she and the rest of the series's contestants embarked on RuPaul's Drag Race UK: The Official Tour.

Cherry Valentine was the subject of the second series premiere of God Shave the Queens, a documentary about the tour. The episode saw Ward reflect on his 2022 documentary Cherry Valentine: Gypsy Queen and Proud about being raised as an English Traveller. It was the first time he had returned to the Traveller community since he left home at 18. He was "absolutely terrified" to make the film and was "unsure 'which route to go down' due to a significant lack of mainstream attention and education on LGBTQ+ Travellers", according to Damshenas, who also said the documentary "received widespread critical acclaim". Ward has been credited as the first contestant on the Drag Race franchise to address his Romani heritage (series 1 winner The Vivienne has since also acknowledged her Romani background).

== Personal life ==
Described as genderfluid and queer, Ward used he/they pronouns when not in drag. As part of the LGBTQ community, Ward hid his Traveller heritage because he feared he might receive "hate or backlash".

=== Death ===
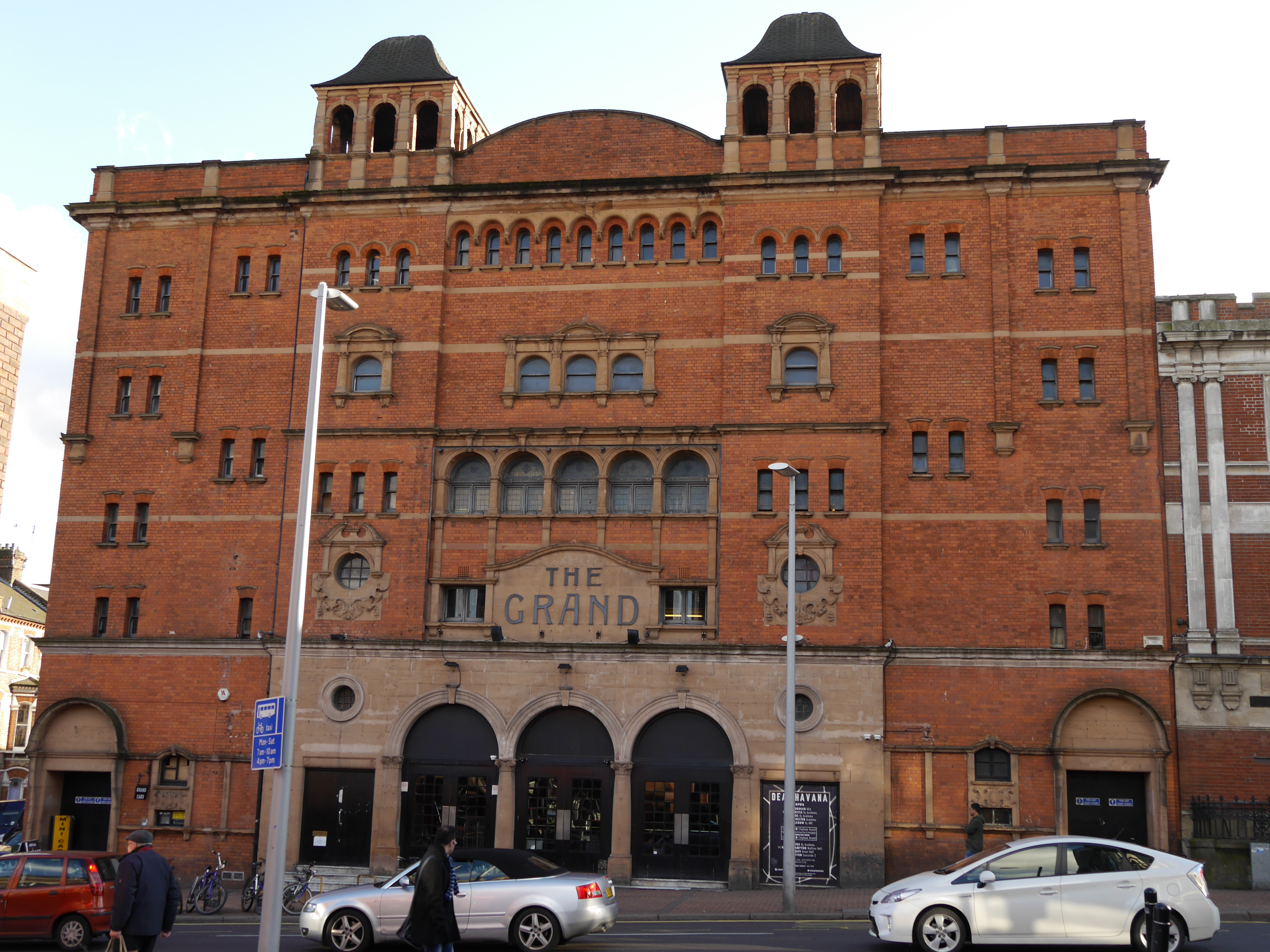
Iconic: The Cherry Valentine Memorial Concert was held at the Clapham Grand in London.

Ward died at his residence in the north London district of Hornsey on 18 September 2022, at the age of 28. A coroner's inquest on 9 February 2023 recorded Ward's death as suicide by hanging. Following the announcement of his death, many Drag Race contestants paid tribute to him, including fellow series 2 contestants Asttina Mandella, A'Whora, Bimini Bon-Boulash, Ellie Diamond, Ginny Lemon, Joe Black, Lawrence Chaney, Sister Sister, Tayce, and Tia Kofi, as well as Baga Chipz, Cheryl Hole, Priyanka, Sum Ting Wong, and The Vivienne. RuPaul described Ward as a "bright star and a lovely person" who would "always be in [their] hearts", and Drag Race judge Michelle Visage said Ward was "one of a kind with a laugh as big as [his] heart".

A series 4 episode of Drag Race UK featured an in memoriam segment following the regular credits, the Cherry's Legacy Fundraiser on GoFundMe exceeded its £10,000 goal, and the organisers of RuPaul's DragCon UK announced that a condolence book would be dedicated to Cherry Valentine. In October 2022, Cherry Valentine's production company Throne Events announced a memorial concert to be held at Clapham Grand in London in November. Tickets to Iconic: The Cherry Valentine Memorial Concert were made available at no cost, with donations benefitting his legacy fund and mental health charities. The livestreamed concert featured performances by Drag Race UK contestants Elektra Fence and Joe Black, as well as the group Traveller Pride. Attendees had the chance to pay their respects by scattering rose petals around Cherry Valentine's entrance look on the show. In 2024, Tia Kofi paid tribute to Cherry Valentine in the second series of RuPaul's Drag Race: UK vs. the World, by wearing an outfit inspired by the latter's red promo look for Drag Race UK.

== Filmography ==
=== Film ===
List of film credits
Year	Title	Role	Notes	Ref.
2022	Cherry Valentine: Gypsy Queen and Proud	Herself	BBC documentary	

=== Television ===
List of television credits
Year	Title	Role	Notes	Ref.
2021	RuPaul's Drag Race UK (series 2)	Herself/Contestant	12th place	
2022	God Shave the Queens	Herself	Series 2	

=== Music videos ===
Year	Title	Artist	Ref.
2021	"My House"	Jodie Harsh	
2021	"Aesthetic"	Cherry Valentine	
2022	"Good Ones"	Charli XCX	

== Discography ==
=== Singles ===
Title	Year	Album	Ref.
"Aesthetic"	2021	Non-album single	
"Iconic"	2021	Non-album single	

=== As a featured artist ===
Title	Year	Album	Ref.
"A Little Bit of Love" (among The Cast of RuPaul's Drag Race UK, Series 2)	2021	Non-album single	

== See also ==
- Mental health in the United Kingdom
- Mental health of LGBTQ people
- Suicide among LGBTQ people
- Suicide in the United Kingdom
