= The RuRuvision Song Contest =

- RuPaul's Drag Race UK episode
- Episode no.: Series 2 Episode 5
- Original air date: 11 February 2021

Guest appearances
- MNEK; Ian Masterson

Episode chronology
- RuPaul's Drag Race UK (series 2)

"The RuRuvision Song Contest" is the fifth episode of the second series of the UK version of the American reality competition television series RuPaul's Drag Race, which aired on BBC Three, on 11 February 2021. This is the first episode filmed after the production of RuPaul's Drag Race UK was halted due to the COVID-19 pandemic, seven months after the previous episode. Veronica Green was forced to withdraw from the competition due to testing positive for COVID-19. As a result, the first three contestants eliminated, Joe Black, Cherry Valentine and Asttina Mandella, were brought back and the remaining contestants voted on whom they wanted to return to the competition. Joe Black was voted to return to the competition. Ginny Lemon was not included due to having eliminated themself from the competition.

The episode has contestants participate in a Eurovision style performance for the main challenge. There was no mini-challenge. MNEK served as a guest judge, alongside regular rotating judge Graham Norton, as well as regular judges RuPaul, and Michelle Visage.

== Episode ==
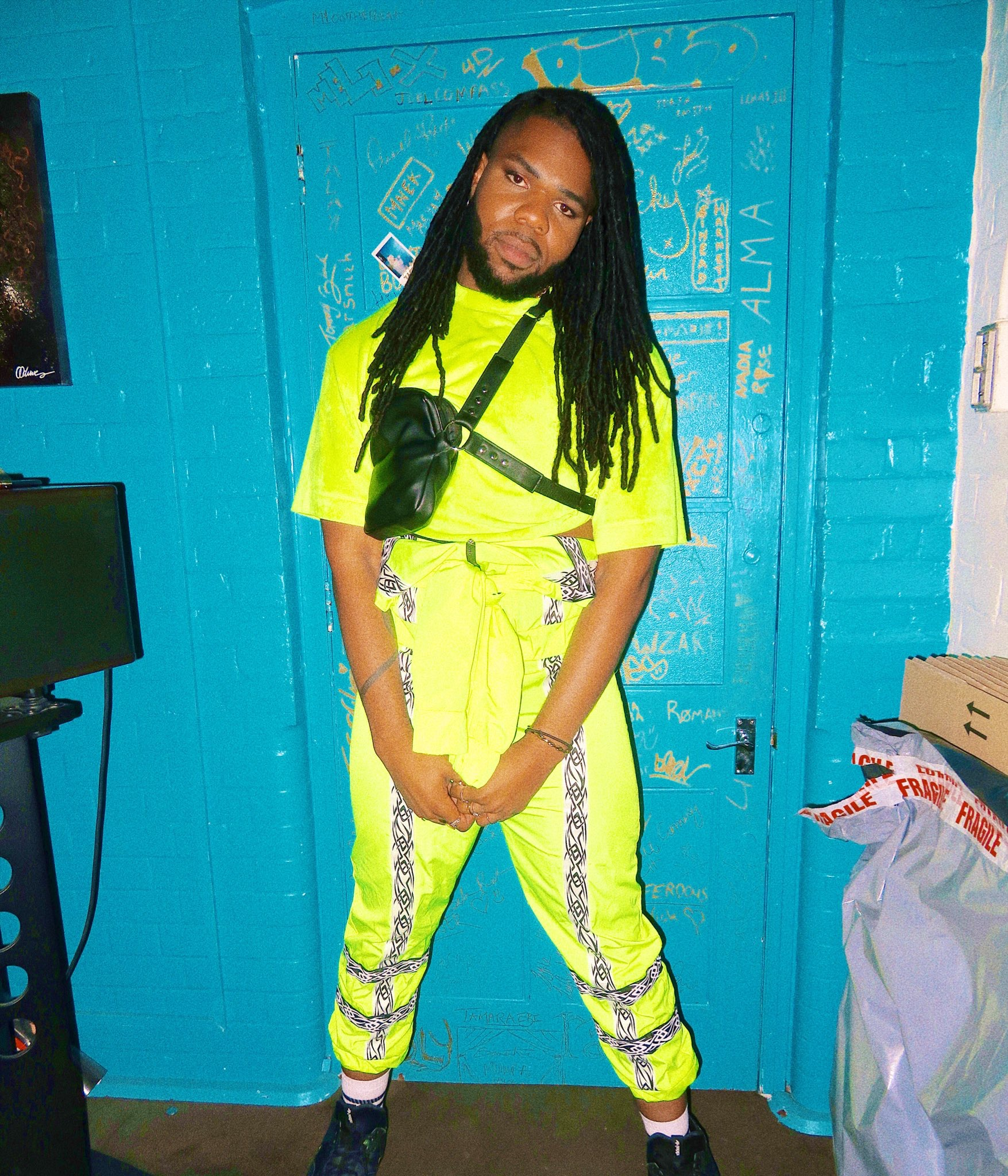
MNEK served as a vocal coach and guest judge.

The episode begins in the Werk Room after the self-elimination of Ginny Lemon. The contestants read Ginny's message and retire to a sofa. A loud klaxon sounds and a message from RuPaul is played informing the contestants that filming of the competition was being halted due to the COVID-19 pandemic and all of the contestants are sent home. The filming of the show continues 7 months later with 7 of the 8 original remaining contestants present. It was announced by RuPaul that Veronica Green tested positive for the COVID-19 and had been removed from the remainder of the competition, but was given an open invitation to return for the third series.

In the hiatus period of the show, the 12 contestants for the series documented their time during the lockdown, which was made into a stand-alone special called Queens on Lockdown.

=== Returning contestants ===
Joe Black, Cherry Valentine and Asttina Mandella were brought back into the Werk Room in animal costumes. Each returning contestant was asked to make a short pitch as to why they should be allowed to return. Then each of the remaining 7 contestants voted by writing in lipstick on a handmirror the name of who they were voting for.

Contestant	Joe Black	Asttina Mandella	Cherry Valentine
A'Whora		check	
Bimini Bon-Boulash		check	
Ellie Diamond	check		
Lawrence Chaney	check		
Sister Sister	check		
Tayce	check		
Tia Kofi	check		
Votes	5	2	0

=== Main challenge ===
Joe Black and Lawrence Chaney were made team captains and had to select members to form a Eurovision style group to perform the song "UK Hun?" for the RuRuvision Song Contest. The groups were as follows:

RuRuvision Song Contest
United Kingdolls	Bananadrama
Lawrence Chaney	Joe Black
A'Whora	Ellie Diamond
Bimini Bon-Boulash	Sister Sister
Tayce	Tia Kofi

Each group had to write and record their own versions of the song. MNEK was the vocal coach for each group. On the main stage, the judges watch the performances of both groups. The contestants performed a mixture of sung and rapped vocals.

=== Runway ===
RuPaul introduces guest judge MNEK and returning judge Graham Norton, and reveals the runway theme for the runway category: A Day at the Seaside. Sister Sister and A'Whora both did the same outfit of a bag of chips. This caused tension between the two backstage.

=== Results ===
RuPaul declares United Kingdolls as the winners, and all of the members receive a RuPeter badge. They are then sent backstage while the Bananadrama members are critiqued. Sister Sister and Ellie Diamond received mixed critiques and were ultimately declared safe. Joe Black was praised for their runway look, but strongly criticised for their look in the Main Challenge: Michelle Visage stated their challenge outfit could have been bought from Primark, to which Joe Black responded it was from H&M. This led to RuPaul stating "I don’t wanna see any fucking H&M". Tia Kofi was also criticised for their outfit being "too regional" and not up to the standard of RuPaul's Drag Race. The four were then sent to the back and the judges deliberated. When all the contestants returned to the stage, RuPaul apologised for their comments.

Contestant	Result
A'Whora	WIN
Bimini Bon-Boulash	WIN
Lawrence Chaney	WIN
Tayce	WIN
Ellie Diamond	SAFE
Sister Sister	SAFE
Tia Kofi	BTM
Joe Black	ELIM

=== Lip sync ===
The bottom two were Joe Black and Tia Kofi who lip-synced to "Don't Leave Me This Way" by The Communards, with Joe Black leaving the competition for a second time.

Episode	Contestants			Song	Eliminated
5	Joe Black	vs.	Tia Kofi	"Don't Leave Me This Way" (The Communards)	Joe Black

The contestant was eliminated after their second time in the bottom two.

== Reception ==
The United Kingdolls version of "UK Hun", reached Number 27 in the Official UK Charts.

In response to the events during the runway critique, H&M sent Joe Black a cake with the inscription "Roses are red, violets are blue, we loved your fit, don't listen to Ru!, Love H&M.", along with a bunch of red roses, which arrived on Valentine's Day.

Isobel Lewis of The Independent wrote that the episode was responsible for breathing new life back into the Drag Race franchise. Lewis stated the episode recaptured the unselfconscious fun of the earlier US series, showing that the contestants do not need to turn everything into a recognisable reality TV "moment". She highlighted an exchange from the episode between Lawrence and Bimini, where Bimini suggests Lawrence to keep a "Positive Mental Attitude" (PMA), to which Lawrence bluntly replies, "get fucked".

The song was alluded to in the second episode of the second season of Canada's Drag Race, with the "Under the Big Top" Rusical featuring a trio of clowns named Bing, Bang and Bong.

Bimini's verse in "UK Hun" was nominated for a BAFTA TV Award in 2022 in the category of Must-See Moment.

== See also ==
- Girl groups in the Drag Race franchise
