= God Shave the Queens =

British documentary series

- Genre: Docuseries
- Directed by: Dane McDonald
- Country of origin: United Kingdom
- Original language: English
- No. of series: 2
- No. of episodes: 20

Production
- Running time: 18–24 minutes
- Production company: World of Wonder

Original release
- Network: BBC Three (online) via iPlayer (UK); WOW Presents Plus (international)
- Release: 10 September 2020 – 6 October 2022

Related
- RuPaul's Drag Race UK

God Shave the Queens is a documentary television series about the tours following the first two series of RuPaul's Drag Race UK. The show originally premiered internationally on 10 September 2020 on WOW Presents Plus internationally, and BBC iPlayer on 15 November 2020 in the United Kingdom.

== Series overview ==
Season	Episodes	Originally released	
Season	Episodes	First released	Last released
1	8	September 10, 2020	October 29, 2020
2	12	July 29, 2022	October 6, 2022

=== Series 1 (2020) ===
The first series contains eight episodes, and was released through WOW Presents Plus on 10 September 2020 and BBC iPlayer on 15 November 2020. The first series follows the contestants of RuPaul's Drag Race UK series one: Gothy Kendoll, Scaredy Kat, Vinegar Strokes, Crystal, Sum Ting Wong, Blu Hydrangea, Cheryl Hole, Baga Chipz, Divina de Campo, and The Vivienne as well as their choreographer Alyssa Edwards on a six-city tour across the UK.

No. overall	No. in series	Title	Original release date
1	1	"Mess Rehearsal"	10 September 2020
2	2	"Newcastle, New Show"	17 September 2020
3	3	"Without a Net"	24 September 2020
4	4	"Birmingham Untucked"	1 October 2020
5	5	"Show Time"	8 October 2020
6	6	"Is Sum Ting Wong"	15 October 2020
7	7	"The Kids Are Alright"	22 October 2020
8	8	"Stuffing Their Stocking"	29 October 2020

=== Series 2 (2022) ===
The second series (containing twelve episodes) followed series two of RuPaul's Drag Race UK contestants: Cherry Valentine, Asttina Mandella, Ginny Lemon, Veronica Green, Joe Black, Tia Kofi, Sister Sister, A'Whora, Ellie Diamond, Bimini Bon-Boulash, Tayce and Lawrence Chaney.

No. overall	No. in series	Title	Original release date
9	1	"Cherry Valentine"	29 July 2022
10	2	"Asttina Mandella"	29 July 2022
11	3	"Ginny Lemon"	5 August 2022
12	4	"Veronica Green"	12 August 2022
13	5	"Joe Black"	19 August 2022
14	6	"Tia Kofi"	26 August 2022
15	7	"Sister Sister"	2 September 2022
16	8	"A'Whora"	9 September 2022
17	9	"Ellie Diamond"	16 September 2022
18	10	"Tayce"	23 September 2022
19	11	"Bimini Bon Boulash"	30 September 2022
20	12	"Lawrence Chaney"	6 October 2022
