= Ginny Lemon =

English drag queen

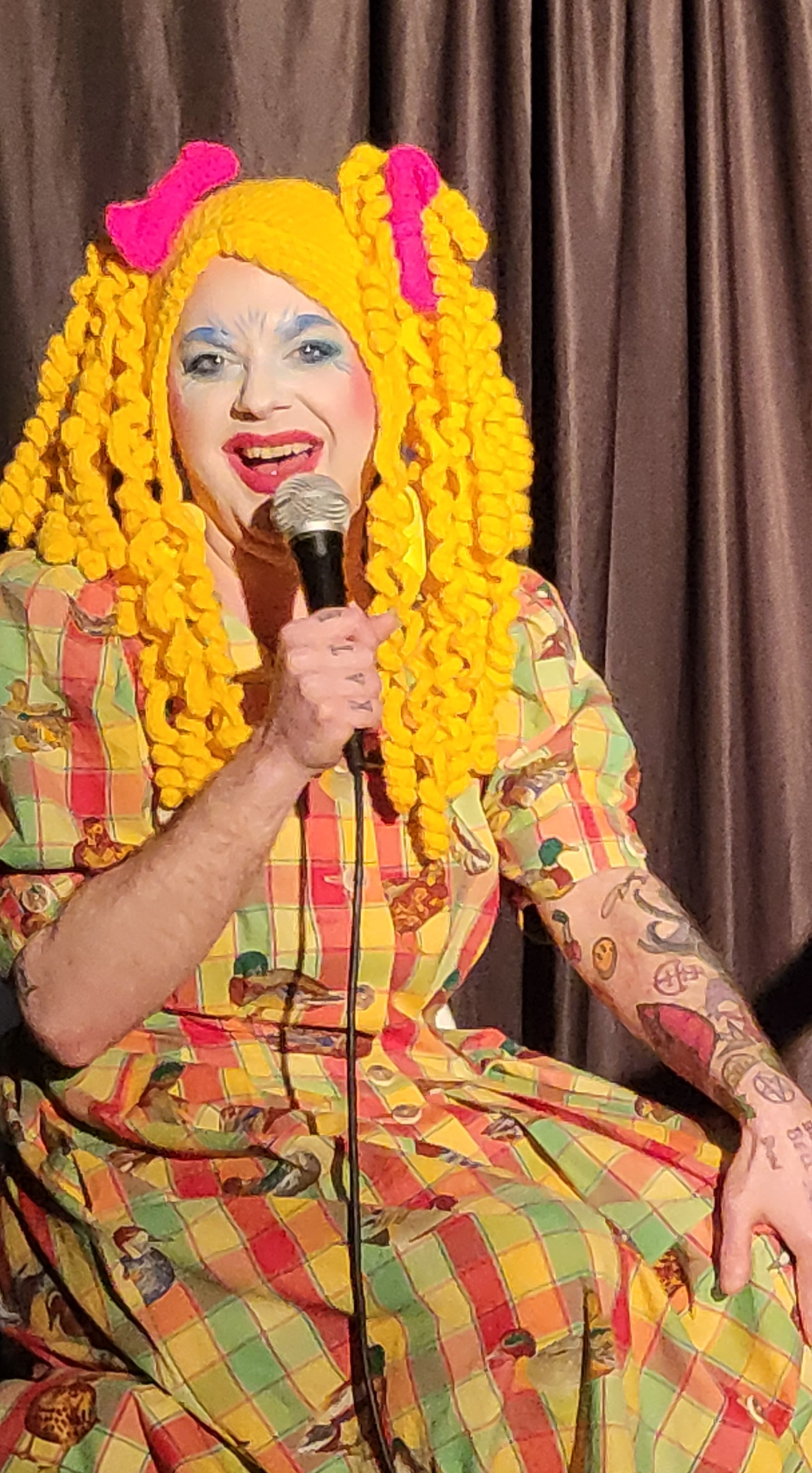
- Ginny Lemon in 2023
- Born: Lewis Matthew Lumiere Croucher; Worcester, England, UK
- Other names: Lewis Spelt Backwards (until 2016); Lewis Mandall
- Education: University of Worcester
- Occupations: Musician; Drag performer
- Years active: 2008–present
- Television: The X Factor (2017); RuPaul's Drag Race UK (series 2)
- Website: Instagram

Lewis Matthew Lumiere Mandall, née Croucher, known professionally as Ginny Lemon, is a British drag performer and recording artist best known for competing on the second series of RuPaul's Drag Race UK. They are known for their alternative and highly campy drag.

== Education ==
Ginny studied at the University of Worcester, and has said they were "hounded out of a job for being gay" whilst working at the university.

== Career ==
Ginny has appeared at Birmingham's SHOUT Festival of Queer Arts and Culture. They appeared on The X Factor in 2017.

While competing on RuPaul's Drag Race UK, Ginny Lemon eliminated themself from the competition in a lip sync round with fellow competitor Sister Sister. They have since said they felt uncomfortable with some of the judges' comments, arguing that RuPaul and Michelle Visage did not understand British humour, and pushed Ginny towards a female-orientated concept of glamour. Ginny Lemon also criticised RuPaul's emotional outburst on the show, where RuPaul criticised Joe Black's outfit (which occurred after Ginny had left), tweeting: "Screaming and swearing at desperate out of work queens for being too regional and unable to afford costumes after 7 months of jobless despair... Nah babz I'm better off at home fank u very much." In February 2022, Lemon embarked on RuPaul's Drag Race UK: The Official Tour alongside the entire cast of the second series of RuPaul's Drag Race UK, in association with World of Wonder and promoter Voss Events.

In January 2022, Lemon appeared alongside fellow cast member and friend Sister Sister on series 7 of E4's Celebrity Coach Trip, joining fellow celebrity travellers in Portugal like Matt Richardson, Honey G, Paul Danan, The Honeyz and Birds of a Feather stars Linda Robson and Lesley Joseph.

In July 2022, Lemon appeared at the opening ceremony of the 2022 Commonwealth Games, performing a musical act in a large lemon hot air balloon wearing a steampunk/pirate outfit.

== Personal life ==
Ginny is non-binary. A discussion with fellow non-binary Drag Race competitor Bimini Bon-Boulash was credited with helping other non-binary people to come out of the closet. They have fibromyalgia. In October 2025, Ginny was hospitalized with meningitis.

== Filmography ==
=== Television ===
- The X Factor (2017)
- RuPaul's Drag Race UK (2021)
- Celebrity Coach Trip (2022)

=== Music videos ===
Year	Title	Artist	Ref.
2021	"My House"	Jodie Harsh	

== Discography ==
Studio albums

- Greatest Pips (2021)
- Tonic (2022)
- Fruit Loop (2025)

Singles

- I'm So Offended (2021)
- I Am Over My Overdraft (2021)
- Woolworths Sneaky Butchers (2021)
- Burnt Pizza (2022)
- Ding Dong (2022)

== Stage ==
Year	Title	Promoter	Location	Ref
2022	RuPaul's Drag Race UK: The Official Tour	Voss Events / World of Wonder	Ipswich, Oxford, Edinburgh, Glasgow, Newcastle, Nottingham, Bournemouth, Southend, Manchester, Sheffield, Blackpool, Llandudno, Birmingham, Cardiff, Liverpool, Basingstoke, Portsmouth, Plymouth, London, Derby, Bristol, Bradford, Aberdeen, Southampton, Stockton, Brighton, and Newport	
