= Veronica Green =

British drag performer

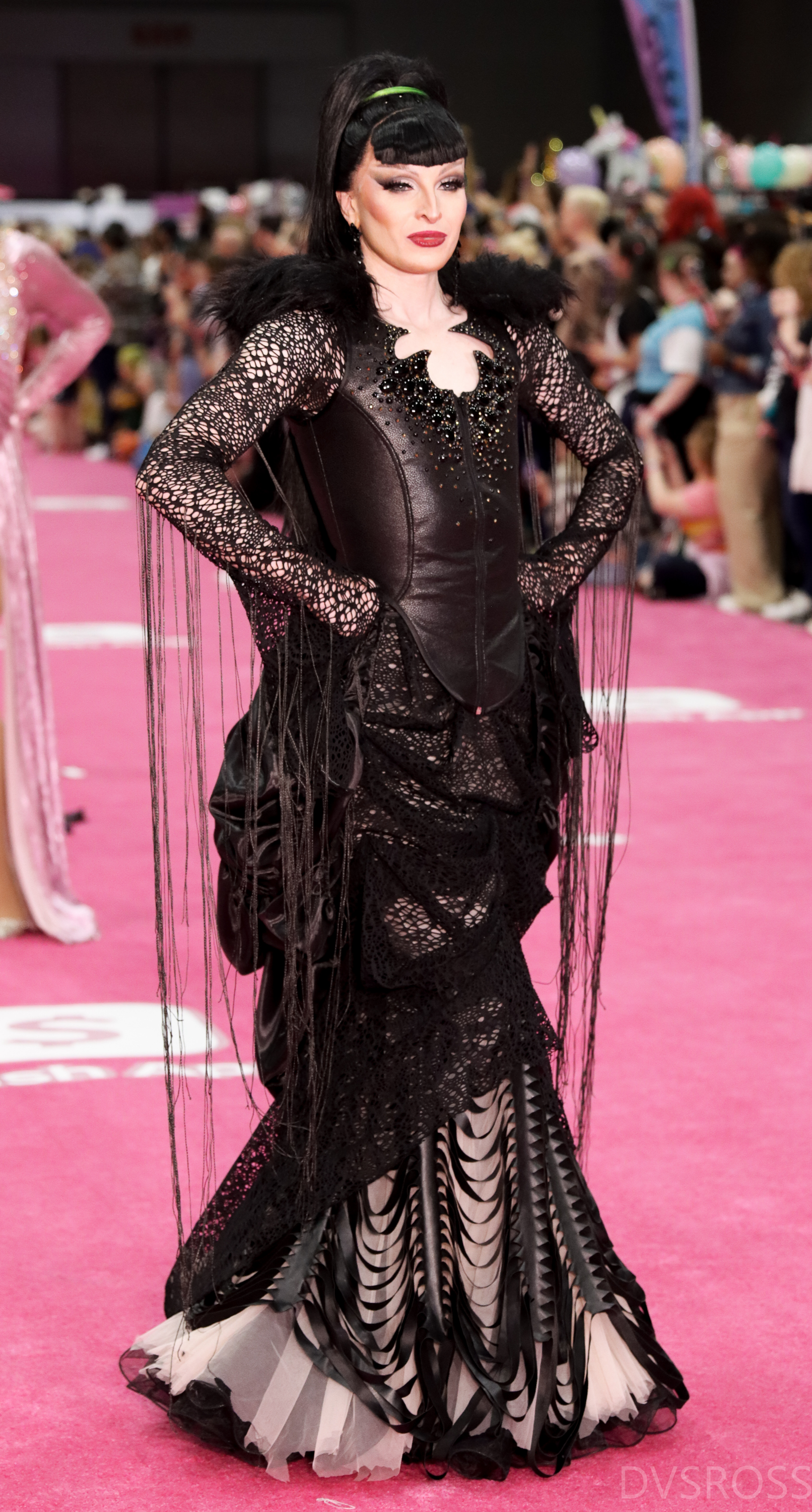
- Veronica Green at RuPaul's DragCon LA, 2023
- Born: Kevin Max Grogan; 1985 or 1986 (age 40–41); Rochdale, United Kingdom
- Occupation: Drag queen
- Years active: 2015–present
- Television: RuPaul's Drag Race UK

Kevin Max Grogan, better known by the stage name Veronica Green, is a British drag performer most known for competing on the second and third series of RuPaul's Drag Race UK.

== Early life ==
Kevin Max Grogan was born in Rochdale, United Kingdom. His father was a retired roofer and builder, and his mother a seamstress. He has a brother, Tony, and a sister, Veronica. Tony is also known by the drag persona Fantasy. The brothers discovered drag when Grogan was ten years old, while watching To Wong Foo, Thanks for Everything! Julie Newmar. He came out as gay to his family at the age of 21, and began doing drag on Halloween while working in Singapore. The first part of his stage name was inspired by his sister's name.

== Career ==
Prior to appearing on RuPaul's Drag Race, Green appeared on BBC One music reality television show All Together Now and performed in front of fellow RuPaul's Drag Race UK contestant Divina de Campo. In December 2020, Green was announced as one of twelve contestants competing on the second series of RuPaul's Drag Race UK and came ninth overall on the season after departing due to contracting COVID-19. She received an open invitation to appear on the third series of the show, she lasted till week 3 of the competition where she was eliminated after losing a lip sync to Vanity Milan, placing ninth for a second time.

In May 2021, Green performed alongside series 1 winner The Vivienne, and fellow series 2 contestant Tia Kofi at the Vaudeville Theatre in Drag Queens of Pop, which ran for three dates and was one of the first performances on the West End after the third national COVID-19 lockdown in England.

In October 2021, she released a new single, "Nothing To Lose", in collaboration with Myleene Klass. She also appeared in a TV and online ad campaign by Bailey's promote its Irish Cream, featuring three witches, played by Green, Tia Kofi and Asia Thorne. It was released in Australia, America as well as the UK.

In February 2022, Green embarked on RuPaul's Drag Race UK: The Official Tour alongside the entire cast of series 2, in association with World of Wonder and promoter Voss Events.

== Personal life ==
Born in Rochdale, Grogan is now based in Croydon, South London. She streams video games on Twitch under the name Veronica Qween.

In October 2024, Grogan revealed that he had been diagnosed with multiple sclerosis three months prior.

== Filmography ==
=== Television ===
Year	Title	Role	Notes
2019	All Together Now	Herself	Contestant Series 2
2021	RuPaul's Drag Race UK	Herself	Contestant Series 2 (9th Place) and Series 3 (9th Place)
2021	Celebrity Ghost Trip	Herself	Contestant (paired with Joe Black)
2021	Children in Need 2021	Herself	Guest appearance
2022	The Apprentice	Herself	Guest appearance (Series 16)
2022	Question Team	Herself	Guest appearance
2024	Bring Back My Girls	Herself	Episode: "RuPaul's Drag Race UK Seasons 3 & 4"

=== Music videos ===
Year	Title	Artist	Ref
2021	"My House"	Jodie Harsh	

== Discography ==
Year	Title	Artist	Album	Notes
2020	"Green Monkey Emergency"	Veronica Green and ADJ	Non-album Single	
2021	"Stars"	Veronica Green	Non-album Single	
2021	"Nothing to Lose"	Veronica Green and Myleene Klass	Non-album Single	

== Stage ==
Year	Title	Promoter	Locations	Ref
2021	Drag Queens of Pop	Nimax Theatres	Vaudeville Theatre	
2022	RuPaul's Drag Race UK: The Official Tour	Voss Events / World of Wonder	Ipswich, Oxford, Edinburgh, Glasgow, Newcastle, Nottingham, Bournemouth, Southend, Manchester, Sheffield, Blackpool, Llandudno, Birmingham, Cardiff, Liverpool, Basingstoke, Portsmouth, Plymouth, London, Derby, Bristol, Bradford, Aberdeen, Southampton, Stockton, Brighton and Newport	
