= Tayce =

Welsh drag performer (born 1994)

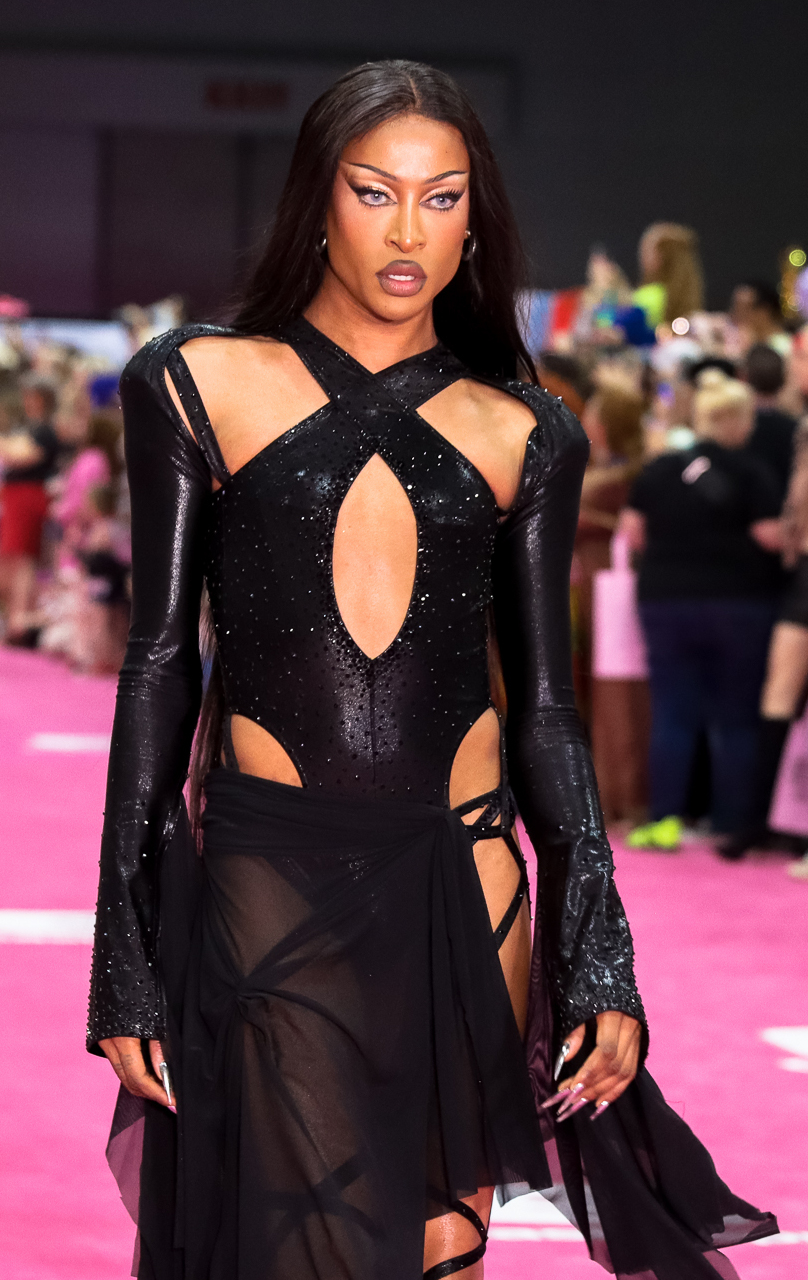
- Tayce at RuPaul's DragCon LA, 2023
- Born: Tayce Szura-Radix; 28 May 1994 (age 32); Newport, Wales
- Occupations: Drag queen, model
- Years active: 2017–present
- Television: RuPaul's Drag Race UK (series 2)
- Height: 6 ft 1 in (1.86 m)
- Website: tayce.komi.io

Tayce Szura-Radix (stage name Tayce; born 28 May 1994) is a Welsh drag queen, rapper and model from Newport, Wales. She (Note: Szura-Radix uses she/her and he/him pronouns. She/her will be used in this article for consistency.) is best known for competing in the second series of RuPaul's Drag Race UK, in which she placed joint runner-up.

== Career ==
=== 2017–2020: Pre-Drag Race UK ===
Tayce moved to London in her late teens. After getting fired from a series of jobs, she became a full-time, professional drag queen in 2017. In June of that year, QX Magazine referred to her as "London's most promising new drag star". In 2018, she became Bougie Drag Brunch's first featured queen, performing regularly alongside other well-known drag queens such as Honey Foxx and eventual Drag Race UK Series Five (2023) contestant Cara Melle.

In January 2020, Tayce attended the inaugural RuPaul's DragCon UK, performing at the event alongside several other queens, including Chicago-based Drag Race Season 9 (2017) runner-up—and eventual winner of All Stars 5—Shea Couleé and Ore-Ho on the main stage.

=== 2020–2021: Drag Race UK Series Two ===
In December 2020, Tayce was announced as one of twelve contestants competing on the second series of RuPaul's Drag Race UK. Tayce won the main challenge in Episode 5 "The RuRuvision Song Contest" (alongside A'Whora, Bimini Bon-Boulash and Lawrence Chaney). However, she also landed in the "bottom two" four times, and had to lip-sync in order to stay in the competition. She won her first three lip-syncs, and sent home Cherry Valentine, Sister Sister and A'Whora. Her performance in the lip sync against Cherry Valentine, to the Cats song 'Memory', went viral. Her fourth lip-sync against Ellie Diamond was declared a "double-shantay", with neither queen being eliminated. Tayce was the first ever contestant on RuPaul's Drag Race UK to survive four lip-syncs and win three of them, and is therefore often called a "lip-sync assassin". She made it to the finale and, alongside Bimini, placed joint runner-up to Lawrence Chaney.

=== 2021–present: Post-Drag Race success; breakthrough into modelling, presenting, and music ===
Tayce frequently performs at nightclubs, predominantly in London and New York. In May 2021, she was a featured performer at Drive Time Drag, a drag drive-in show which was the first of its kind in the UK. Tayce embarked on the sold out United Kingdolls Tour (alongside A'Whora, Bimini Bon-Boulash and Lawrence Chaney) with promoter Klub Kids in July 2021, and in February 2022 Tayce embarked on RuPaul's Drag Race UK: The Official Tour (alongside the entire cast of the second series of RuPaul's Drag Race UK), in association with World of Wonder and promoter Voss Events. In September 2022, Tayce launched a solo tour across the UK, The Assassination Tour, with promoter Klub Kids. In September 2023, Tayce joined Voss Events' Night of the Living Drag tour across the US alongside international RuPaul's Drag Race alumni.

In December 2024, she competed in the 2024 Strictly Come Dancing Christmas Special, paired with professional dancer Kai Widdrington, becoming the first drag queen to compete on the show. The couple scored maximum points from all four judges and were voted the winners.

== Other ventures ==
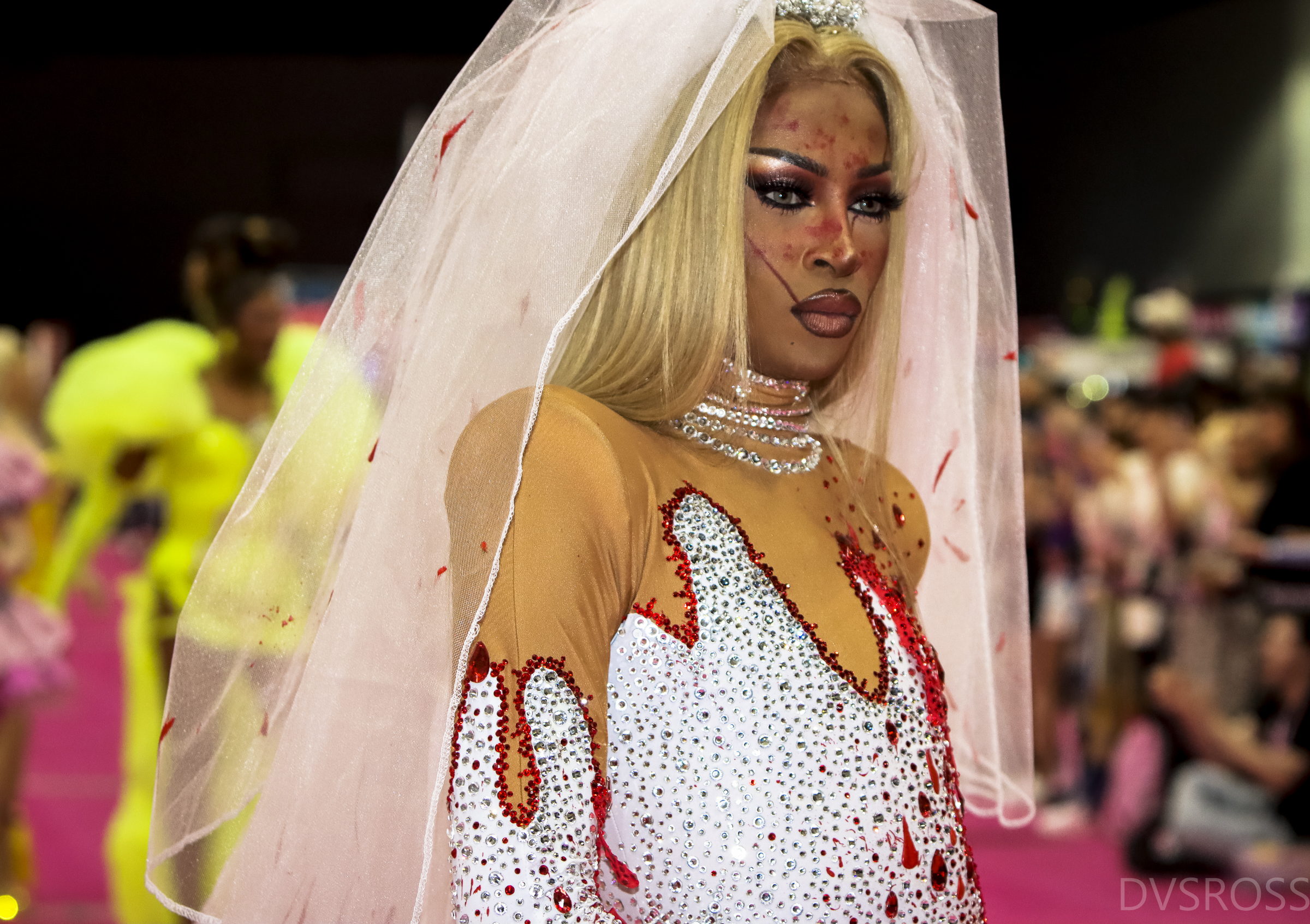
Tayce at RuPaul's DragCon LA, 2022

=== Brand campaigns ===
In March 2021, Tayce was announced as an ambassador for Coca-Cola's "Open That Cola!" campaign in the United Kingdom.

In April 2021, Tayce, alongside fellow Drag Race contestant A'Whora, co-launched The Bluebella Pride Collection, a lingerie line by brand Bluebella. Proceeds from the collection were donated to the Kaleidoscope Trust, a British non-profit which promotes the abolition of anti-gay laws in the Commonwealth. In June 2021, Tayce partnered with Boohoo owned fashion brand Nasty Gal for a 60-piece gender neutral capsule collection.

In April 2022, Tayce teamed up with Absolut Vodka, Chet Lo, and the Institute of Digital Fashion for the #BornToMix campaign, in which Tayce modelled a digital dress designed by Chet Lo.

=== Modelling ===
Tayce is currently signed with Models 1, the largest modelling agency in Europe. She has walked runways for designer brands such as Richard Quinn, The Blonds, EgonLab, and Namilia. She has also modelled in two Jean Paul Gaultier fragrance campaigns.

=== Hosting and radio ===
Tayce has been a frequent collaborator with the BBC (especially BBC Radio 1 and BBC Sounds). In August 2021, she presented the Saturday breakfast show slot on BBC Radio 1 from 9:30am, alongside Clara Amfo, as part of Drag Day also featuring Tayce's fellow Series 2 contestants: Bimini Bon-Boulash and Lawrence Chaney, as well as DJ Jodie Harsh. Tayce has also presented a mindfulness-based programme in collaboration with BBC Radio 1 Relax (a BBC Sounds exclusive subsidiary of BBC Radio 1). Since 2021, Tayce has hosted MTV's Queerpiphany alongside Munroe Bergdorf. In June 2024 Tayce presented the Sky TV original documentary ‘’Striking With Pride - United at the Coal Face’’ where she tells children the real story behind the 2015 hit film Pride.

=== Music ===
In December 2022, Tayce released her debut rap single, "Swagzilla". In November 2023, she was featured on Jan Sport's single "For You Only".

== Personal life ==
Tayce's father is Roger Radix, a former bass guitarist for Wham! Tayce currently resides in Streatham, South London, England; she formerly lived and had a brief relationship with fellow RuPaul's Drag Race UK contestant A'Whora.

On episode eight of RuPaul's Drag Race UK, Tayce opened-up about how being diagnosed with chlamydia and gonorrhea at the age of 18 damaged her self-esteem, and altered her perceptions surrounding relationships and sexuality due to feelings of shame and guilt. Tayce's openness when discussing this experience was commended for breaking stigmas around sexually transmitted infections, including by the Terrence Higgins Trust, a British charity.

Tayce is gay, and uses she/her pronouns while in-drag, and he/him pronouns while out-of-drag.

== Filmography ==
=== Television ===
Year	Title	Role	Notes	Ref
2019	Your Face or Mine	Themselves	Series 5, Episode 6	
2021	RuPaul's Drag Race UK	Contestant	Series 2 Runner-up	
2021	Richard Quinn A/W21	Herself (cameo)	Fashion film	
2021	Celebrity Gogglebox	Herself	alongside Tia Kofi	
2021	Queerpiphany	Herself	Co-host	
2021	Be Here, Be Queer	Herself	Netflix special	
2023	The National Lottery's New Year's Eve Big Bash	Herself	alongside Baga Chipz, Cheryl Hole, Kitty Scott-Claus and Cara Melle	
2024	Striking With Pride - United at the Coal Face	Herself	Sky Documentaries, Story Films, alongside Jonathan Blake, Beaufort Male Choir	

=== Music videos ===
As lead artist

Year	Title	Ref
2023	"Swagzilla"	

As guest appearance

Year	Title	Artist	Ref
2020	"Levitating" (The Blessed Madonna Remix featuring Madonna and Missy Elliott)	Dua Lipa	
2020	"Baby"	Madison Beer	
2021	"My House"	Jodie Harsh	
2021	"Confetti"	Little Mix	
2025	"Pogo"	Brooke Candy	

=== Radio ===
Year	Title	Role	Notes	Ref
2021	Radio 1 Breakfast with Tayce & Clara Amfo	Herself	BBC Radio 1	

=== Web series ===
Year	Title	Role	Notes	Ref
2019	The Gold Rush	Herself	TrashTV	
2021	Cosmo Queens UK	Herself	Cosmopolitan UK	
2022	God Shave the Queens	Herself	Featured queen	
2022	Bring Back My Girls	Herself	Guest	
2024	Very Delta	Herself	Guest	

- Touch-Ups with Raven (2025)

== Discography ==
=== As lead artist ===
Title	Year	Peaks		Album
Title	Year	UK	UK Big Top 40	Album
"Swagzilla"	2022	—	—	Non-album singles
"IDONTWANNA"	2025	–	–	Non-album singles

=== As featured artist ===
List of singles as a featured artist
Title	Year	Peaks		Album
Title	Year	UK	UK Big Top 40	Album
"UK Hun?" (among The Cast of RuPaul's Drag Race UK, Season 2)	2021	27	3	Non-album singles
"A Little Bit of Love" (among The Cast of RuPaul's Drag Race UK, Season 2)	2021	—	—	Non-album singles
"For You Only" (Jan feat. Tayce)	2023	—		Non-album singles
"Outro" (Maggot Mouf feat. Tayce)	2025	–	–	Weird Tracks 4 Weirdos

== Stage ==
Year	Title	Promoter	Locations	Ref
2021	Drive Time Drag	The Parking Lot Social	Bristol, Cheltenham, Coventry	
2021	United Kingdolls The Tour	Klub Kids	Birmingham, Cardiff, Glasgow, Leeds, Liverpool, London, Manchester, Sheffield	
2021	MODE	Klub Kids	Amsterdam, Cardiff, London, Manchester	
2022	RuPaul's Drag Race UK: The Official Tour	Voss Events / World Of Wonder	Ipswich, Oxford, Edinburgh, Glasgow, Newcastle, Nottingham, Bournemouth, Southend, Manchester, Sheffield, Blackpool, Llandudno, Birmingham, Cardiff, Liverpool, Basingstoke, Portsmouth, Plymouth, London, Derby, Bristol, Bradford, Aberdeen, Southampton, Stockton, Brighton, Newport	
2022	United Kingdolls Tour	ITD Events / Klub Kids	Sydney, Adelaide, Melbourne, Brisbane, Auckland, Wellington	
2022	Tayce: The Assassination Tour	Klub Kids	London, Reading, Southampton, Bristol, Torquay, Nottingham, Birmingham, Sheffield, Leeds, Manchester, Liverpool, Dundee, Glasgow, Newcastle, Cardiff	
2023	RuPaul's Drag Race: Night of the Living Drag	Voss Events	Niagara Falls, ON, Waterbury, CT, Portland, ME, Albany, NY, Roanoke, VA, Norfolk, VA, Atlantic City, NJ, Bethlehem, PA, Charleston, WV, Evansville, IN, Saint Louis, MO, Ames, IA, Fort Wayne, IN, Nashville, TN, Knoxville, TN, Chattanooga, TN, Shreveport, LA, Baton Rouge, LA, Mobile, AL, Birmingham, AL, Memphis, TN, Hammond, IN, Toledo, OH, Hanover, MD, Newark, NJ	

== Awards and nominations ==
Award Ceremony	Year	Work	Category	Result
Berlin Music Video Awards	2023	Swagzilla	Best Bizarre	Nominated
