= RuPaul's DragCon UK =

Drag entertainment convention

RuPaul's Drag Con UK
- Status: Active
- Genre: Drag entertainment
- Venue: Exhibition Centre London
- Locations: London, England
- Coordinates: 51°30′29″N 0°01′44″E
- Country: United Kingdom
- Inaugurated: 18–19 January 2020
- Most recent: 12–13 January 2024
- Next event: 10–11 January 2025
- Organizer: World of Wonder
- Website: uk.rupaulsdragcon.com

RuPaul's DragCon UK is a multi-genre entertainment convention held annually at the Exhibition Centre London located in London, England. The two-day event primarily features prominent drag performers for executives, fanatics, and online brands. This marks the third edition of RuPaul's DragCon, co-produced by American drag queen RuPaul and World of Wonder founders Fenton Bailey and Randy Barbato.

The first event took place on 18 January 2020 at the Olympia Exhibition Centre and was met with negative criticism. Due to the COVID-19 pandemic in England, the convention was on an indefinite hiatus until 2023 where it resumed normally at a different venue.

== History ==
=== 2019–2020: Olympia Exhibition Centre ===
During the annual entertainment convention RuPaul's DragCon NYC in September 2019, a third edition of the exhibition taking place in the United Kingdom was announced. The contestants from the reality competition series RuPaul's Drag Race UK (2019) were announced to appear alongside television personalities RuPaul and Michelle Visage. This expansion led the American franchise to be often credited as mainstream media for its drag entertainment success, including in the United Kingdom. Tickets went on pre-sale on 10 September, followed by the general ticket sale three days later, via Ticketmaster. Two months later, various alumni contestants from the RuPaul's Drag Race franchise, notable locals Joseph Harwood, Harnaam Kaur, and the late internet personality Sophie Anderson of the Cock Destroyers were included in the lineup.

The convention took place on 18 January 2020 at the Olympia Exhibition Centre located in London, England. RuPaul and Visage had a ribbon-cutting ceremony and featured a pink carpet where drag performers had the opportunity to walk through the venue. Meanwhile, there were reports of many people queuing outside the venue for approximately two hours. Without any explanation, security personnel told ticket holders to come back the next day. This resulted in many people demanding refunds, comparing the event to Fyre Festival and TanaCon on X (formerly Twitter). An official statement from the organizers explained the queue was stopped due to the venue's maximum capacity, which raised "health and safety fears."

The next day, the venue operated normally and refunds were issued to ticket holders. Many panels featured the concert residency RuPaul's Drag Race Live!, the webseries Fashion Photo RuView, and the live audience podcast Sibling Rivalry; a play area was made available for younger attendees that included Drag Queen Story Hour. During the event, the World of Wonder founders announced they had greenlit two docuseries: God Shave the Queens (2020–2022), and an untitled Trinity the Tuck pageantry project. Singer-songwriters FKA Twigs and Matty Healy attended the convention in support of actress Denise Welch, who was an emcee for a panel.

After its inaugural event, no further plans for a second installment were announced. Two months later, it was first reported by The Hollywood Reporter that its annual Los Angeles convention had been cancelled amid the coronavirus outbreak in the United States. The triad locations were combined into a two-day online event that was made available to stream through YouTube.

=== 2023–present: Exhibition Centre London ===
Two years later, the production company announced in March that the convention would make a comeback after its indefinite hiatus in the next upcoming year. The second iteration was set to take place across three days at the Exhibition Centre London. General tickets went on sale on 15 May 2022. Half of the contestants from the first series of RuPaul's Drag Race: UK vs the World (2022) confirmed their appearances; soon after eighty drag performers were signed up to attend the event.

Cherry Valentine, a previous contestant on RuPaul's Drag Race UK (2021), who was scheduled to appear at the three-day event, died on 18 September 2022. The organisers of RuPaul's DragCon UK announced that a condolence book would be dedicated to Cherry Valentine.

Two months later, the full line-up was released including various contestants from the Drag Race franchise worldwide; notable locals Juno Birch, Yshee Black, and Louis Cyfer were also set to appear with three contestants from reality competition series The Traitors (2022). The characters of children's television series Teletubbies were featured to perform and sponsored the event. American footwear company Crocs also promoted the event and gave visitors the opportunity to purchase customized Jibbitz charms.

== Criticism ==
Andy Duke for cultural website Louder Than War named the inaugurated convention as a discovery for drag entertainment as "an extension of punk" and "empowerment were the key messages of the event." Duke saw the production design depicting the American documentary film Paris is Burning (1990). Although it received negative publicity for opening day, the exhibition "felt like a holiday away from the harsh daylight reality of the real world."

river
(@river_medway)
tweeted:

also btw @Crocs dropped out of sponsoring dragcon (the day before) because they were worried about the backlash from the extreme right! let it be known that they are not allies and any "support" for our community has been performative.

10 January 2023

Seeing the sponsorship from Crocs for the upcoming convention, conservative news Washington Examiner reported American citizens were burning the company's merchandise. Soon after, the footwear company "allegedly" and quietly pulled out their partnership on 5 January 2023, a day before the event. Drag performer River Medway took the opportunity and accused the company for their rainbow capitalism and to avoid backlash from far-rightists.

Apart from that, Rick Findler for the daily newspaper The Guardian sees the event getting its "advancement and growth in popularity" with having sense in the community and providing "another world where everyone is celebrated for expressing who they want to be and how they want to show it." Findler showed the positive side of involving children in the event where they enjoyed the costume design and the humour coming from the British reality series.
