= Juno Birch =

English drag queen, sculptor, and YouTuber (born 1993)

- Born: 25 December 1993 (age 32); Manchester, England
- Occupations: Drag queen; Sculptor; Comedian; YouTuber
- Years active: 2018–present
- Partner: Phil Lopes

YouTube information
- Channel: Juno Birch
- Years active: 2019–present
- Subscribers: 521 thousand
- Views: 50.9 million
- Last updated: 16 July 2026

Juno Birch (born 25 December 1993) is an English drag queen, comedian, sculptor, and YouTuber. She began performing in drag professionally in late 2018 and has since received significant media attention for her work.

Birch is known for her YouTube channel and for her unique drag aesthetic, which features pastel "alien skin" (typically blue or pink), yellow hair, dishwashing gloves, and retro sunglasses. In 2020, GQ called her "one of the country's most interesting drag queens".

In addition to working as a drag queen, Birch creates and sells ceramic sculptures that "blur the lines between masculine and feminine attributes".

== Early life ==
Birch was born in Manchester on 25 December 1993, and grew up in Frodsham and Runcorn. She is a trans woman and first came out around the age of 13 or 14, before starting hormone replacement therapy at age 16. She had gender confirmation surgery in 2015.

== Career ==
In a video created with Vogue, Birch said that the first time she painted her face was in school around the age of 13 when she was portraying the Joker, wearing "bright white make-up and massive red lips", in drama class at school.

Birch began performing in drag professionally in December 2018. She described her drag persona as a "Martian spy woman, meets The Muppets, meets 1960s housewife, meets Squidward, meets The Fifth Element, the sixth element, the seventh element... all the elements, darling." Birch is known for her unique drag aesthetic, which features pastel "alien skin" (typically blue or pink), yellow hair, and retro sunglasses. In 2020, GQ called her "one of the country's most interesting drag queens". Her work and her social media have attracted significant media attention and she has collaborated with other artists, such as Alexis Stone and Trixie Mattel.

In addition to working as a drag queen, Birch creates and sells ceramic sculptures. She creates pieces that depict an exaggerated version of her drag character, often featuring details like Adam's apples, overdrawn lips, big hair, exposed breasts, beard stubble, and square jawlines "to blur the lines between masculine and feminine attributes". Birch said that, sometimes, she creates a concept for a look by sculpting it before attempting the look on her own face and body. Dazed described her work as "retro-futuristic sculptures in an array of pastel colours."

On her YouTube channel, she primarily records herself as she plays The Sims, does makeup tutorials, and collaborates with other artists and drag queens. Birch is also popular on Instagram, where she has amassed more than 614,000 followers.

In March 2021, Birch announced her international tour "Attack of the Stunning" featuring fellow drag queen Liquorice Black. In December 2024, Birch announced her second international tour "The Probed Tour". Locations for both tours include the UK, USA, Canada, and Australia. She has also appeared at RuPaul's DragCon UK in 2023, 2024 and 2025.

== Personal life ==
Birch became engaged to musician Phil Lopes in late 2024.

== Filmography ==
=== Television ===
Year	Title	Role	Notes	Ref.
2022-2024	Trixie Motel	Herself	Season 1, Episode 4: "Atomic Bombshell"	
2022-2024	Trixie Motel	Herself	Season 1, Episode 8: "Pride Grand Opening"	
2022-2024	Trixie Motel	Herself	Season 2, Episode 2: "Out of the Closet and Into the Bedroom"	

=== Web Series ===
Year	Title	Role	Notes	Ref.
2020	Transformations	Herself	Episode: "Juno Birch"	

== Tours ==
=== Headlining tours ===
- Attack of the Stunning (2022)
- The Juno Show (2023)
- The Probed Tour (2025)
