= Cherry Valentine: Gypsy Queen and Proud =

- Directed by: Pete Grant
- Produced by: Victoria Bolstridge, Pete Grant
- Starring: Cherry Valentine
- Production company: World of Wonder
- Distributed by: BBC Three
- Release date: 25 January 2022
- Running time: 55 minutes
- Country: United Kingdom
- Language: English

Cherry Valentine: Gypsy Queen and Proud is a 2022 English documentary film directed by Pete Grant and released on BBC Three and then WOW Presents Plus.

== Plot ==
The documentary tells the story of George Ward leaving the English Traveller (Gypsy) community in Darlington after coming out as gay and being rejected by the community. Ward left his home and started his new life as Cherry Valentine, a drag alter-ego. In the documentary, Ward returned to his roots to see how he could do drag and maintain his English Traveller (Gypsy) identity. At the end of the documentary, there is a short memorial tribute to George Ward, who died by suicide on 18 September 2022.
