= A'Whora =

British drag performer

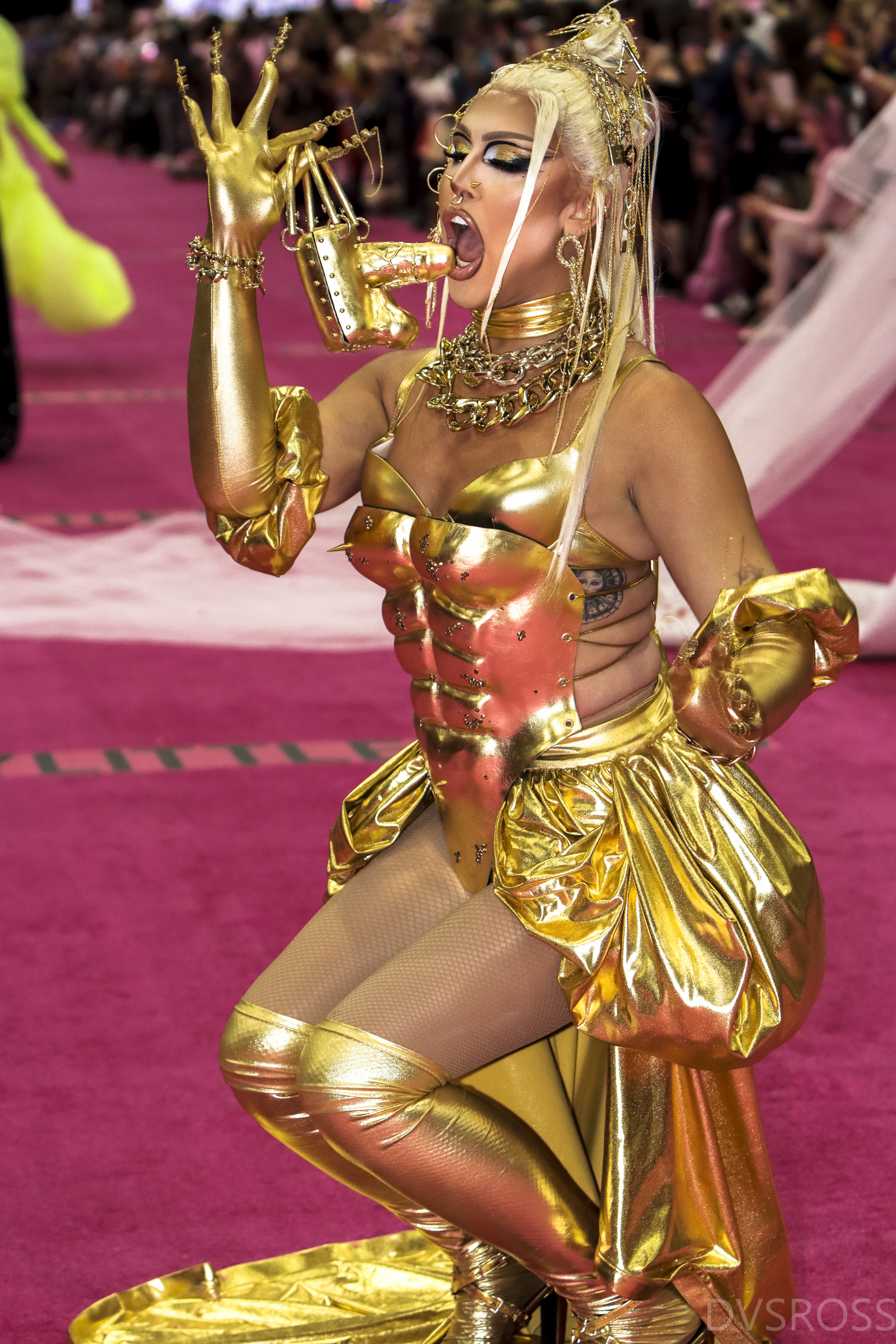
- A'Whora at RuPaul's DragCon LA, 2022
- Born: George Boyle; 22 September 1996 (age 29); Worksop, England
- Education: London College of Fashion (BA)
- Occupation: Drag queen
- Years active: 2018-present
- Television: RuPaul's Drag Race UK (series 2)

George Boyle (born 22 September 1996), better known by the stage name A'Whora, is a British drag queen from Worksop, England. He is best known for competing on the second series of RuPaul's Drag Race UK.

== Education ==
Boyle studied for a diploma in womenswear and fashion at a college in Mansfield when he was 16, and graduated in 2013. In 2015, he moved to London to study at the London College of Fashion, where he earned a bachelor's degree in womenswear in 2018.

== Career ==
Professionally, Boyle has fulfilled their career as a fashion designer and model by producing a sustainable 10 piece collection for H&M in 2015, working for Kurt Geiger and John Lewis & Partners, in addition to modelling for Vogue Italia and becoming the curator and founder of their own personal fashion label Le'Boy George.

In December 2020, A'Whora was announced as one of twelve contestants competing on the second series of RuPaul's Drag Race UK and placed fifth on the series overall. A'Whora embarked on a sold out UK Tour alongside Tayce, Bimini Bon Boulash and Lawrence Chaney for the United Kingdolls Tour with promoter Klub Kids in July 2021, and in February 2022 A'Whora participated in RuPaul's Drag Race UK: The Official Tour alongside the entire cast of the second series of RuPaul's Drag Race UK, in association with World of Wonder and promoter Voss Events. In February 2021, A'Whora walked the runway at London Fashion Week alongside fellow series 2 contestant Bimini Bon-Boulash for London-based fashion brand Art School, designed by Eden Loweth.

== Personal life ==
A'Whora currently resides in Streatham in South London, England and formerly lived with fellow RuPaul's Drag Race UK contestant Tayce.

== Filmography ==
=== Television ===
Year	Title	Role	Notes	Ref
2021	RuPaul's Drag Race UK	Contestant	Series 2 (5th Place)	
2022	Celebrity Ex on the Beach	Main cast	Series 2	
2022	Celebrity Karaoke Club	Contestant	Series 3 (9th Place)	

=== Web series ===
Year	Title	Role	Notes	Ref
2021	TOWIE: Dragged Out	Herself	ITV2/ITVBe social media channels	
2022	Bring Back My Girls	Herself		

=== Music videos ===
Year	Title	Artist	Ref
2021	"Confetti"	Little Mix	

== Discography ==
=== As featured artist ===
List of singles as a featured artist
Title	Year	Peaks		Album
Title	Year	UK	UK Big Top 40	Album
"UK Hun?" (among The Cast of RuPaul's Drag Race UK, Season 2)	2021	27	3	Non-album single

== Stage ==
Year	Title	Promoter	Location	Ref
2021	United Kingdolls The Tour	Klub Kids	Torquay, Southampton, Newcastle, Glasgow, Sheffield, Leeds, Cardiff, Liverpool, Manchester, Birmingham and London	
2021	MODE	Klub Kids	Manchester, Cardiff, London, Glasgow and Amsterdam	
2022	RuPaul's Drag Race UK: The Official Tour	Voss Events / World Of Wonder	Ipswich, Oxford, Edinburgh, Glasgow, Newcastle, Nottingham, Bournemouth, Southend, Manchester, Sheffield, Blackpool, Llandudno, Birmingham, Cardiff, Liverpool, Basingstoke, Portsmouth, Plymouth, London, Derby, Bristol, Bradford, Aberdeen, Southampton, Stockton, Brighton and Newport	
2022	United Kingdolls Tour	ITD Events / Klub Kids	Sydney, Adelaide, Melbourne, Brisbane, Auckland and Wellington	
