= Sister Sister (drag queen) =

British drag performer

- Born: Philip Doran; 2 September 1988 (age 37); Liverpool, England, United Kingdom
- Occupation: Drag queen
- Years active: 2012–present
- Television: RuPaul's Drag Race UK (series 2)

Philip Doran (born 2 September 1988), better known by the stage name Sister Sister, is a British drag queen from Liverpool, England who is best known for competing on the second series of RuPaul's Drag Race UK.

== Career ==
Sister Sister started pursuing their career as a drag performer in 2012, and cites British comedians Dawn French, Jennifer Saunders and Victoria Wood as influences for their drag persona, as well as British drag queen Lily Savage. She began her career in London. In December 2020, Sister Sister was announced as one of twelve contestants competing on the second series of RuPaul's Drag Race UK, where they place sixth overall. In February 2022, Sister Sister embarked on RuPaul's Drag Race UK: The Official Tour with the series 2 cast, in association with World of Wonder and promoter Voss Events. In May 2023, Sister Sister appeared in the trailer for the BBC coverage of the Eurovision Song Contest, which was being hosted that year in Liverpool.

== Personal life ==
Sister Sister currently resides in Liverpool, England.

Sister Sister spoke out against online abuse she had received whilst appearing on the second series of RuPaul's Drag Race UK. In an essay for The Guardian in February 2021, the Liverpool-based entertainer said "Without going into too much detail, one [post] that came from a blank profile described in graphic detail how they would like to see me die” and mentioned that their mental health "reached rock bottom" during the peak of the online abuse she was receiving. Discussing her experience on BBC Radio 5 Live in March 2021, Sister Sister urged people to be more considerate online - particularly given the impact of the COVID-19 pandemic. "The new normal is that we're all talking online, so we have to really consider... how does this sound?," she told host of the programme Naga Munchetty. She received support from a variety of Drag Race contestants including fellow series 2 contestants Bimini Bon-Boulash, Tayce and Asttina Mandella.

== Filmography ==
=== Television ===
Year	Title	Role	Notes	Ref
2021	RuPaul's Drag Race UK	Contestant	Series 2	
2022	Celebrity Coach Trip	Contestant	Series 7	

== Discography ==
=== As featured artist ===
Title	Year	Album
"UK Hun?" The Cast of RuPaul's Drag Race UK (Bananadrama Version)	2021	Non-album single

== Stage ==
Year	Title	Promoter	Locations	Ref
2022	RuPaul's Drag Race UK: The Official Tour	Voss Events / World of Wonder	Ipswich, Oxford, Edinburgh, Glasgow, Newcastle, Nottingham, Bournemouth, Southend, Manchester, Sheffield, Blackpool, Llandudno, Birmingham, Cardiff, Liverpool, Basingstoke, Portsmouth, Plymouth, London, Derby, Bristol, Bradford, Aberdeen, Southampton, Stockton, Brighton and Newport	
