= Asttina Mandella =

British drag performer

- Born: Aston Joshua; 11 February 1993 (age 33); London, England
- Occupations: Drag queen, dancer
- Years active: 2012–present
- Television: RuPaul's Drag Race UK (series 2)

Aston Joshua (born 11 February 1993), better known by the stage name Asttina Mandella, is a British drag queen and dancer from East London. She is best known for competing on the second series of RuPaul's Drag Race UK, where she came eleventh on the series.

== Career ==
Mandella has been a drag queen since 2012, but before 2020 she was mostly known for being a dancer. Asttina is trained in ballet, tap dance, jazz, voguing, hip-hop dance, waacking and street dance. She has also performed as a backup dancer alongside prestigious performers such as: Hercules & Love Affair, The Pussycat Dolls, Little Mix and Kanye West. Her drag name derives from a hybrid of her birth name, American singer Tina Turner and former President of South Africa and philanthropist Nelson Mandela. In December 2020, Asttina was announced as one of twelve contestants competing on the second series of RuPaul's Drag Race UK, and placed eleventh overall in the competition. Mandella was the eleventh contestant to enter the Werk Room and penned the now synonymous catchphrase 'Rude!", and also won the first episode of the series, and performed well in episode two, however shortly after in episode three she placed in the bottom, and was eliminated in a lip sync challenge against contestant Tia Kofi to the song "Don't Start Now" by Dua Lipa. In February 2022 Asttina will embark on RuPaul's Drag Race UK: The Official Tour alongside the entire cast of the second series of RuPaul's Drag Race UK, in association with World of Wonder and promoter Voss Events. In August 2021, she will be a featured performer in Klub Kids London Presents: NOIR: The Tour, where 25% of the proceeds from the production will be donated to the Black Lives Matter movement.

== Personal life ==
Mandella currently resides in East London. She also drew media attention when discussing the representation of Black Queer icons within the United Kingdom, alongside fellow contestant Tayce, as it was a conversation that "opened up to so many people" according to Digital Spy.

== Filmography ==
=== Television ===
Year	Title	Role	Notes	Ref
2019	Drag S.O.S.	Dance Instructor	Series 1	
2021	RuPaul's Drag Race UK	Contestant	Series 2, 11th place	
2022	Cherry Valentine: Gypsy Queen and Proud	Herself	BBC documentary	
2022	Queens for the Night	Herself	One-off special	

=== Music videos ===
Year	Title	Artist	Ref
2020	"Baby"	Madison Beer	
2021	"Good Ones" (Drag Performance Video)	Charli XCX	

== Discography ==
=== As featured artist ===
Title	Year	Album
"A Little Bit of Love" (among The Cast of RuPaul's Drag Race UK, Season 2)	2021	Non-album single

== Stage ==
Year	Title	Promoter	Locations	Ref
2021	Squirrel Friends	Klub Kids	London, Manchester, Birmingham, Liverpool and Newcastle	
2021	Noir: The Tour	Klub Kids	Glasgow, Manchester, London, Cardiff, Brighton and Birmingham	
2022	RuPaul's Drag Race UK: The Official Tour	Voss Events / World Of Wonder	Ipswich, Oxford, Edinburgh, Glasgow, Newcastle, Nottingham, Bournemouth, Southend, Manchester, Sheffield, Blackpool, Llandudno, Birmingham, Cardiff, Liverpool, Basingstoke, Portsmouth, Plymouth, London, Derby, Bristol, Bradford, Aberdeen, Southampton, Stockton, Brighton and Newport	
