= Ellie Diamond =

Scottish drag performer

- Born: Elliot Haefner Glen; 20 December 1998 (age 27); Dundee, Scotland
- Occupation: Drag queen
- Years active: 2014–present
- Television: RuPaul's Drag Race UK (series 2)

Elliot Haefner Glen (born 20 December 1998), better known by the stage name Ellie Diamond, is a Scottish drag performer most known for competing on the second series of RuPaul's Drag Race UK.

== Early life ==
Glen was born and raised in Dundee. He has described his upbringing as Christian. Glen attended Monifieth High School.

== Career ==
Ellie Diamond has been as a drag performer since 2015 in Dundee, and has said that although there isn't an established drag scene there, she hopes to start one. Her drag name derives from the feminine version of her birth name, Elliot and Diamond is inspired by British singers: Ellie Goulding, Marina and The Diamonds and Hannah Diamond, and that in drag she "shines like a diamond". In December 2020, Ellie Diamond quit her job at McDonald's (to which she returned during a break in filming) after she was announced as one of twelve contestants competing on the second series of RuPaul's Drag Race UK, and placed fourth overall in the competition. In March 2021, Ellie Diamond, alongside her fellow RuPaul's Drag Race UK finalists Lawrence Chaney, Bimini Bon Boulash and Tayce, was photographed and interviewed for The Guardian and later British Vogue. In February 2022, Ellie Diamond embarked on RuPaul's Drag Race UK: The Official Tour alongside the entire cast of the second series of RuPaul's Drag Race UK, in association with World of Wonder and promoter Voss Events. In 2023, she announced she was taking a break from drag due to the increased cost of living.

== Personal life ==
Glen uses he/him pronouns out of drag and she/her pronouns in drag. He identifies as queer.

== Filmography ==
=== Television ===
Year	Title	Role	Notes
2021	RuPaul's Drag Race UK	Contestant	Series 2

== Discography ==
=== As featured artist ===
Title	Year	Album
"UK Hun?" The Cast of RuPaul's Drag Race UK (Bananadrama Version)	2021	Non-album singles
"A Little Bit of Love" (among The Cast of RuPaul's Drag Race UK, Season 2)	2021	Non-album singles

== Stage ==
Year	Title	Promoter	Location	Ref
2021	Drive Time Drag	The Parking Lot Social	Newcastle, Bristol, Manchester, Liverpool, Birmingham, Aberdeen, Edinburgh and Glasgow	
2022	RuPaul's Drag Race UK: The Official Tour	Voss Events / World of Wonder	Ipswich, Oxford, Edinburgh, Glasgow, Newcastle, Nottingham, Bournemouth, Southend, Manchester, Sheffield, Blackpool, Llandudno, Birmingham, Cardiff, Liverpool, Basingstoke, Portsmouth, Plymouth, London, Derby, Bristol, Bradford, Aberdeen, Southampton, Stockton, Brighton and Newport	
