= Joe Black (drag queen) =

British drag performer

- Born: Joseph Lewis Black; 23 December 1989 (age 36); Portsmouth, England, UK
- Occupation: Cabaret
- Years active: 2007-present
- Television: RuPaul's Drag Race UK (series 2)
- Website: www.misterjoeblack.com

Joseph Lewis Black (born 23 December 1989) is a British musician, drag performer and cabaret artist from Brighton, England. He rose to international attention in 2021 as a contestant on the second series of RuPaul's Drag Race UK getting eliminated first and again fifth, after being voted back on to the show in episode five.

== Career ==
Black has fulfilled his career as a cabaret performer since 2007, and has become one of the leading figures in the dark cabaret genre. He regularly performs in Brighton (in which he resides) and often performs at the annual Brighton Fringe festival. Black has cited his love for music as one of the main reasons he's kept on pursuing his career; he often plays the piano, accordion, musical saw, ukulele and theremin at his performances. Black has toured extensively across the UK, Europe, Australia and America for more than a decade. This included a UK tour with the season 9 contestant of RuPaul's Drag Race, Sasha Velour.

In December 2020, Black was announced as one of twelve contestants competing on the second series of RuPaul's Drag Race UK. Black was the first contestant eliminated in a lip sync challenge against contestant Bimini Bon-Boulash to the song "Relax" by Frankie Goes to Hollywood. However, Black returned in episode five when the previously eliminated queens returned from a forced COVID-19 production break (excluding Ginny Lemon) and won his spot back in the competition after the contestants voted to bring him back. Black was again eliminated following a lip sync challenge against contestant Tia Kofi to the song "Don't Leave Me This Way" by The Communards. He is the first contestant to return after being eliminated from RuPaul's Drag Race UK. Since his elimination, Black announced a UK Tour titled Decopunk, which began touring in September 2021, as well as the release of a 40% ABV limited edition gin of the same name. In February 2022, Black embarked on RuPaul's Drag Race UK: The Official Tour alongside the entire cast of the second series of RuPaul's Drag Race UK, in association with World of Wonder and promoter Voss Events.

== Personal life ==
Black has spoken openly about having and living with Tourette's Syndrome, on multiple occasions.

== Filmography ==
=== Television ===
Year	Title	Role	Notes	Ref
2021	RuPaul's Drag Race UK	Contestant	Series 2	

=== Music videos ===
Year	Title	Artist	Ref.
2021	"My House"	Jodie Harsh	
2022	"Final Curtain"	Joe Black	

== Discography ==
=== As featured artist ===
Title	Year	Album
"UK Hun?" The Cast of RuPaul's Drag Race UK (Bananadrama Version)	2021	Non-album single

== Stage ==
Year	Title	Promoter	Location	Ref
2021	Decopunk	Gallos Talent	Norwich, Brighton, Bath, Birmingham, Ilkley, London, Cardiff, Nottingham, Glasgow, Edinburgh, Dundee and Manchester	
2022	RuPaul's Drag Race UK: The Official Tour	Voss Events / World of Wonder	Ipswich, Oxford, Edinburgh, Glasgow, Newcastle, Nottingham, Bournemouth, Southend, Manchester, Sheffield, Blackpool, Llandudno, Birmingham, Cardiff, Liverpool, Basingstoke, Portsmouth, Plymouth, London, Derby, Bristol, Bradford, Aberdeen, Southampton, Stockton, Brighton and Newport	
