= Lawrence Chaney =

Scottish drag performer (born 1996)

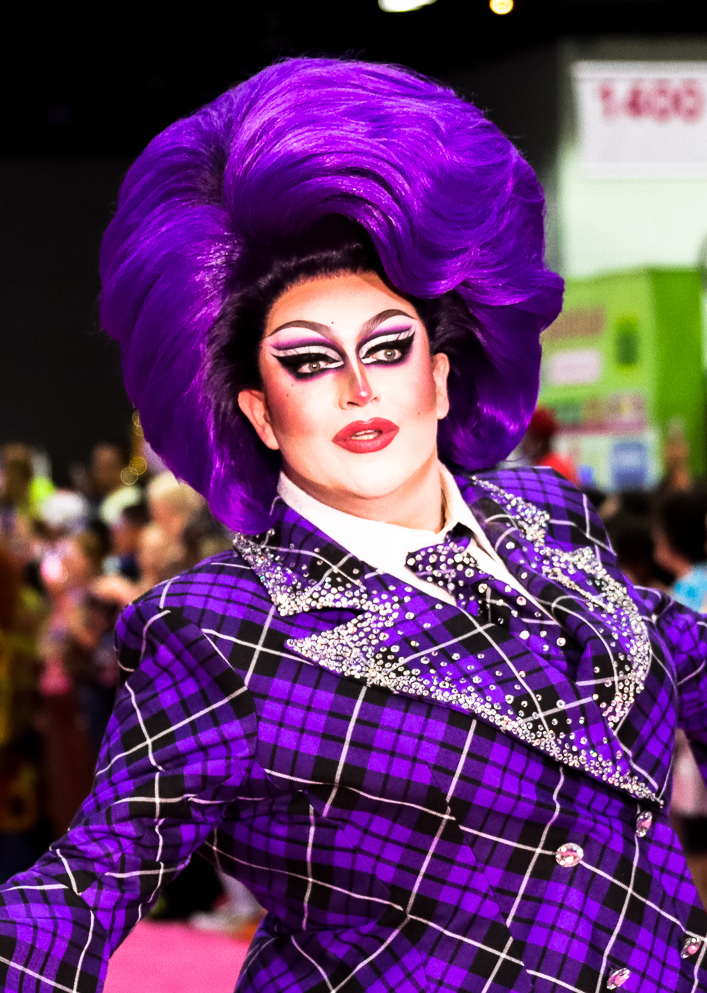
- Lawrence at RuPaul's DragCon LA, 2023
- Born: Lawrence Maidment; 16 October 1996 (age 29); Helensburgh, Scotland
- Citizenship: British
- Occupation: Drag queen
- Years active: 2014–present
- Television: RuPaul's Drag Race UK (series 2)
- Website: lawrencechaney.com

Lawrence Chaney (born Lawrence Maidment; 16 October 1996) is a Scottish drag queen based in Glasgow. They are best known for winning the second series of RuPaul's Drag Race UK, becoming the first Scottish drag queen and the second Plus Size contestant to win across the franchise. Their role on the series later earned them the 2021 BAFTA Scotland Audience Award. As part of their Drag Race victory, Chaney was awarded their own online television series, later titled Tartan Around, which premiered in 2022.

== Career ==
Chaney has professionally fulfilled their career as a drag performer since 2014 in Glasgow. In an interview with Metro, Chaney said their drag surname "Chaney" was inspired by 1920s prolific silent movie star Lon Chaney and explained that, "He was known as the man of a thousand faces and I'm known as the queen of a thousand faces, because I'm good at impersonation, stupid voices and general buffoonery."

From 2017 to 2019, Chaney was a regular contributor to the award-winning BBC The Social producing short, witty commentary and makeup clips representing Scottish drag culture. This led to a TV commission for The Social called Insider's Guide, in which Chaney took viewers on a tour of Glasgow's cultural hotspots.

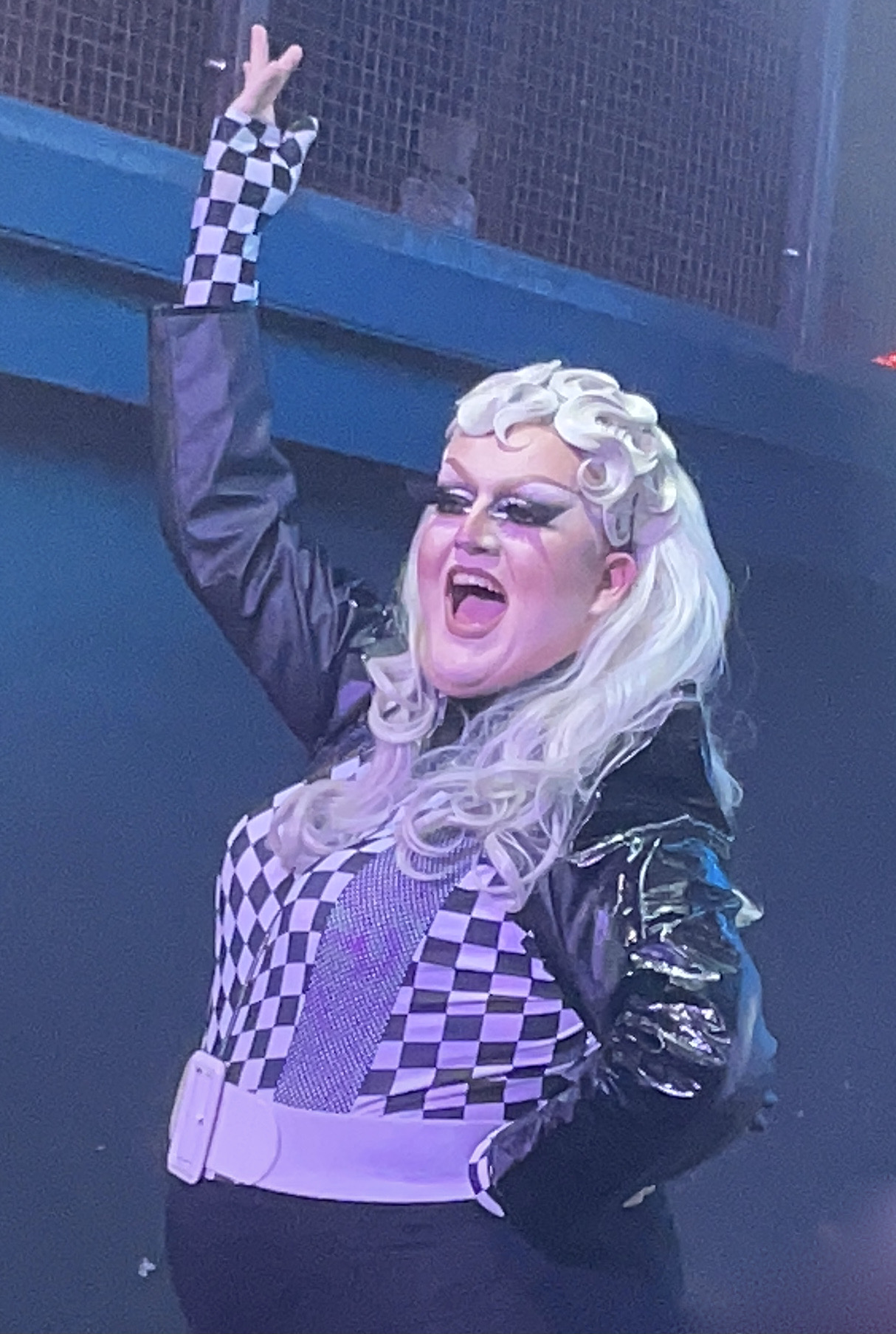
Lawrence Chaney in 2021

In December 2020, Chaney was announced as one of twelve contestants competing on the second series of RuPaul's Drag Race UK. On 18 March 2021, Chaney was announced as the winner of the series, becoming the first Scottish and first plus-size winner of a Drag Race season hosted by RuPaul (the first ever being Drag Race Thailand season 1 winner Natalia Pliacam). As part of their Drag Race victory, Chaney was awarded their own online television series, later titled Tartan Around, which premiered in 2022.

In March 2021, Chaney, alongside their fellow RuPaul's Drag Race UK finalists Tayce, Bimini Bon-Boulash, and Ellie Diamond, was photographed and interviewed for The Guardian and later British Vogue. Lawrence also embarked on a UK Tour alongside A'Whora, Bimini Bon-Boulash, and Tayce for the United Kingdolls Tour with promoter Klub Kids in July 2021, and in February 2022, Chaney embarked on RuPaul's Drag Race UK: The Official Tour alongside the entire cast of the second series of RuPaul's Drag Race UK, in association with World of Wonder and promoter Voss Events.

In April 2021, Chaney was interviewed for and featured on the cover of Attitude's "Tea Time Digital Special", in association with Taimi. Chaney was also a featured guest and panelist at the digital National Student Pride 2021 event.

In May 2021, Transworld announced they had acquired the rights to Chaney's forthcoming memoir, Lawrence (Drag) Queen of Scots: The Dos and Don'ts of a Drag Superstar.

Preceding RuPaul's Drag Race UK, Chaney has been a frequent collaborator with the BBC (especially BBC Sounds). On 21 August 2021, they presented the Saturday mid-morning slot on BBC Radio 1 from 10:30am, alongside Arielle Free and other drag queens, as part of "Drag Day".

== Personal life ==
Chaney grew up in both Helensburgh in Scotland and Newbury in England. Chaney currently resides within the Gorbals area of Glasgow, Scotland. They have expressed their support for Scottish independence.

Regarding their gender identity, Chaney stated in an article for the i: "I still don't know if I am male, female, or somewhere in between. I think the best way to describe my gender is fluid, but this isn't finite. I see myself as ever evolving and always discovering more about myself."

== Filmography ==
=== Television ===
Year	Title	Role	Notes	Ref
2019	Mother Tuckers	Themself	Television documentary	
2021	RuPaul's Drag Race UK	Contestant	Winner; Series 2	
2021	Lorraine	Themself	Guest	
2021	Celebrity Juice	Themself	Guest	
2021	The Hit List	Themself	Guest	
2021	The Great British Sewing Bee	Themself	Guest	
2022	Cherry Valentine: Gypsy Queen and Proud	Themself	BBC Documentary	
2022	Ant & Dec's Saturday Night Takeaway	Themself	Performed as part of the End of the Show Show	
2022	Celebrity Gogglebox	Themself	Guest	
2022	Blankety Blank	Themself	Guest	
2022	Martin Compston's Scottish Fling	Themself	BBC Scotland miniseries; Episode: "The West Coast"	
2022	Celebrity Lingo	Themself	Guest	
2022	The Wheel	Themself	Guest	
2022	RuPaul's Drag Race UK	Themself	Guest; Series 4	
2022	Lawrence Chaney's Homecoming Queens	Themself		
2024	Slaycation	Themself		
2025	RuPaul's Drag Race	Themself	Guest; Season 17	
2025	The Celebrity Inner Circle	Themself	Guest; Series 1	

=== Radio ===
Year	Title	Role	Notes	Ref
2021	Radio 1 Drag Day with Lawrence Chaney & Arielle Free	Themself	BBC Radio 1	

=== Web series ===
Year	Title	Role	Notes	Ref
2021	National Student Pride 2021	Themself	National Student Pride	
2021	Cosmo Queens UK	Themself	Cosmopolitan UK	
2021	I Like to Watch UK	Themself	Netflix UK	
2022	Tartan Around	Themself	WOWPresents+ Original	
2022	God Shave the Queens	Themself	Featured queen	
2022	Bring Back My Girls	Themself	Guest	
2023	Give It to Me Straight	Themself	Guest	
2023	Binge Queens	Themself	Guest	
2024	The Pit Stop	Themself	Guest	
2024	RuPaul's Drag Race Live Untucked	Themself	WOWPresents Plus original	
2024	House of Laughs	Themself	WOWPresents Plus original	
2024	Touch-Ups with Raven	Themself		

== Discography ==
=== As lead artist ===
Title	Year	Album
"We Werk Together" (with Ant & Dec, The Vivienne and Krystal Versace)	2022	Non-album single

=== As featured artist ===
List of singles as a featured artist
Title	Year	Peaks		Album
Title	Year	UK	UK Big Top 40	Album
"UK Hun?" (among The Cast of RuPaul's Drag Race UK, Season 2)	2021	27	3	Non-album singles
"A Little Bit of Love" (among The Cast of RuPaul's Drag Race UK, Season 2)	2021	—	—	Non-album singles
"UK Hun?" (Frock Destroyers featuring Lawrence Chaney)	2021	—	—	Non-album singles

== Stage ==
Year	Title	Promoter	Location	Ref
2021	Squirrel Friends	Klub Kids	London, Manchester, Birmingham, Liverpool and Newcastle	
2021	United Kingdolls The Tour	Klub Kids	Torquay, Southampton, Newcastle, Glasgow, Sheffield, Leeds, Cardiff, Liverpool, Manchester, Birmingham and London	
2021	The Lawrence Chaney Show	Klub Kids	Reading, Southampton, Torquay, Bath, Exeter, Plymouth, Nottingham, Hull, London, Sheffield, Birmingham, Cardiff, Leeds, Manchester, Liverpool, Middlesbrough, Newcastle, Glasgow, Edinburgh, Dundee and Brighton	
2022	RuPaul's Drag Race UK: The Official Tour	Voss Events / World of Wonder	Ipswich, Oxford, Edinburgh, Glasgow, Newcastle, Nottingham, Bournemouth, Southend, Manchester, Sheffield, Blackpool, Llandudno, Birmingham, Cardiff, Liverpool, Basingstoke, Portsmouth, Plymouth and London	
2022	United Kingdolls Tour	ITD Events / Klub Kids	Sydney, Adelaide, Melbourne, Brisbane, Auckland and Wellington	

== Awards and nominations ==
Year	Award ceremony	Category	Work	Results	Ref.
2021	31st British Academy Scotland Awards	Audience Award	Themself	Won	
2022	The WOWIE Awards	Best Book Award (The Reading is Fundamental Award)	(Drag) Queen of Scots: The Dos and Don’ts of a Drag Superstar	Won	

Awards and achievements
Preceded by The Vivienne	Winner of RuPaul's Drag Race UK; Series 2 (2021)	Succeeded by Krystal Versace
