= Jodie Harsh =

British DJ

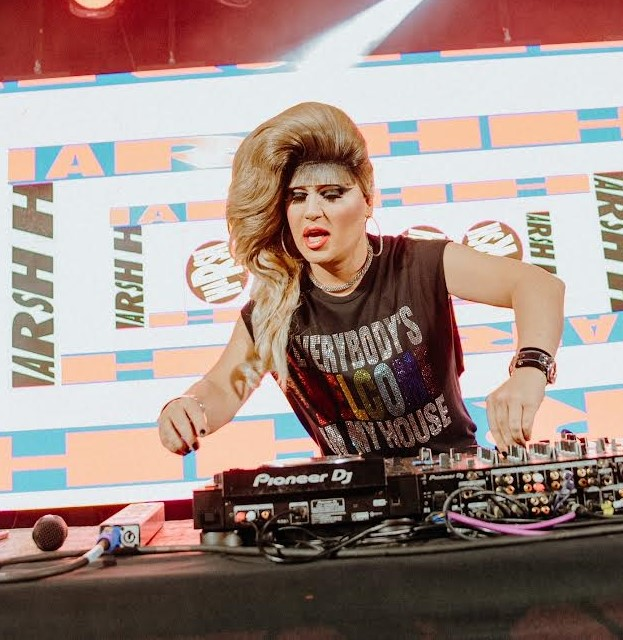

Background information
- Born: Jay Clarke
- Origin: Canterbury, Kent, England
- Genres: House; disco; pop
- Occupations: DJ; songwriter; record producer
- Instruments: Turntables; sampler; drums
- Years active: 2008–present
- Label: Warner
- Website: www.jodieharsh.com

Jay Clarke, known professionally as Jodie Harsh, is a British DJ, music producer, promoter, and drag queen who was born in Canterbury, Kent, now based in London.

== Career ==
=== Nightlife ===
Jodie Harsh adopted her moniker at the age of 18 when she moved to London for her studies at the London College of Fashion. Her name is inspired by television personality and glamour model Jodie Marsh, and is intended to be "a piss-take of that naff celebrity culture, where people are famous for doing nothing". She started exploring the drag scene and working in nightlife. She hosted her own parties at different venues across London, with her debut event taking place at Soho Revue Bar (now The Box).

She founded the gay club brand Room Service in 2010, which was initially based in London but later expanded internationally. As a promoter for Room Service, Harsh booked renowned DJs like Honey Dijon to perform. During these parties, she also began to DJ herself due to budget constraints for hiring opening act DJs. Harsh's reputation as a DJ grew, and she received bookings from various clubs in Europe and beyond, as well as fashion brand events. In 2016, she achieved further notoriety when she launched the party Dollar Baby in East London, where she was accompanied by her friend Lady Gaga on opening night.

In July 2021, Harsh launched club night Feel It in association with live music venue Omeara, alongside Clayton Wright. The club night has hosted sets and performances from acclaimed artists like Jessie Ware, Annie Mac, Eats Everything, Patrick Topping and Charli XCX.

=== Music ===
Harsh started writing and producing music a few years after becoming a DJ. She created remixes for various artists, such as Beyonce's "BLOW", Fergie's "LA Love", and Justin Timberlake's "Suit and Tie". Additionally, she produced The Night, an EP for Melanie C. Harsh then began developing her own artist project and collaborated with SOPHIE to co-produce the track "Secret (Shh)" for Charli XCX's Vroom Vroom EP. Later, they co-wrote start's debut single "Tuesday". Harsh released subsequent singles and an EP under her own Harsh Beats label, including "Don't Try Me", "Filthy Rich", and "Beats and Pieces".

As the pandemic forced clubs to shut down abruptly in 2020, Harsh's DJ career came to an unexpected halt. This prompted her to venture into music production and release her own tracks, as well as to start livestreaming and podcasting. In November 2020, she unveiled her first single signed to a record label, "My House" initially under Another Rhythm records, but later signed a deal with Warner Music UK. "My House" gained popularity and was played on Radio 1 Playlist for several months, becoming the top trending sound on TikTok, and featured cameos from 61 British drag queens in the music video, including nearly every queen who'd been featured in both seasons of RuPaul's Drag Race UK. The dance track instantly became a post-lockdown anthem as clubs reopened across the country. Harsh's subsequent singles included "No Sleep", "Good Time", "Shock", and "Hectic".

Harsh has created remixes for several artists, including Sonny Fodera, Kylie Minogue, Years and Years, Charli XCX, Rina Sawayama, Fatboy Slim, and Sigala. In 2021, she signed a major global publishing deal with Universal Music. In 2022, Harsh was featured on the BBC Radio 1 playlist for her "My House" and her SG Lewis co-production "No Sleep". In 2024, Harsh supported Troye Sivan on the UK/EU Something to Give Each Other Tour. She opened for Sivan at the Wembley Arena in London on June 27. In 2025, Harsh also supported Kylie Minogue on the UK/EU dates of the Tension Tour. She first opened for Minogue at the OVO Hydro in Glasgow on May 16 and finished supporting at the MEO Arena in Lisbon on July 15

=== Book ===
In May 2024, it was announced that Faber & Faber has acquired Harsh's memoir You Had to Be There for UK and Commonwealth rights (excluding Canada) and audio rights. Scheduled for release in autumn 2025, the book details Harsh’s intense decade in 2000's London nightlife, capturing a liberated, pre-social media era.

=== Other ===
In addition to her music career and DJing, Harsh is the host of Life of the Party, a podcast that has completed two seasons so far. The show features interviews with a variety of guests from the music industry, including the likes of Fatboy Slim, Amy Lamé, Nile Rogers, Roisin Murphy, Joel Corry, The Blessed Madonna and Annie Mac.

In April 2016, Harsh appeared in Absolutely Fabulous: The Movie, a 2016 film adaptation of the cult British television series. She played herself in the movie, which also stars Jennifer Saunders, Joanna Lumley, and supermodel Kate Moss.

In 2021, Harsh made a guest appearance on the third episode of the second series of RuPaul's Drag Race UK on BBC Three. She also co-hosted an episode of BBC Radio 1's Dance Anthems, alongside Charlie Hedges. Harsh has also made notable appearances on radio shows such as the Essential Mix for Pete Tong's show and on Radio 1's Mini Mix.

Out described Harsh as "Britain's Best-Known Drag Queen" and The Guardian characterized her "Britain's most famous drag queen DJ/friend to the stars" in 2008. PinkNews described her as "Britain’s busiest working drag queen" before Drag Race UK, and BBC referred to her as a "staple of the UK's club scene for more than a decade" in a 2021 article.

== Personal life ==
Harsh was born in Canterbury, Kent. She attended the London College of Fashion. While at university, she first adopted the persona of Jodie Harsh to make money through nightclub jobs and DJing.

== Discography ==
=== Extended plays ===
Title	EP details	Track listing	Source
Beats N' Pieces	Released: September 2020; Label: Harsh Beats	1. "Fascinating Light"; 2. "Paris"; 3. "Nerve"; 4. "Burn It Down" (featuring Rowetta)	

=== Singles ===
Title	Year	Label	Source
"Tuesday" (featuring Sophie)	2019	Harsh Beats	
"Don't Try Me" (featuring Vula)	2020	Harsh Beats	
"Filthy Rich"	2020	Harsh Beats	
"Never Knew (L.O.V.E)"	2020	Harsh Beats	
"My House"	2021	Warner Records	
"No Sleep"	2021	Warner Records	
"Good Time"	2022	Warner Records	
"Shock"	2022	Warner Records	
"Hectic"	2023	Warner Records	
"Celebrate"	2023	Harsh Beats	
"Like It Like That"	2023	Harsh Beats	
"Hit Me Up" (featuring Bryn Christopher)	2024	Harsh Beats	
"Joy"	2024	Harsh Beats	
"Kiss It Better"	2025		
"The Night Is Yours"	2026		
"Touch"	2026		
"I Feel It"	2026		
