= The Anvil, Basingstoke =

Concert hall and performing arts centre in Basingstoke, England

The Anvil
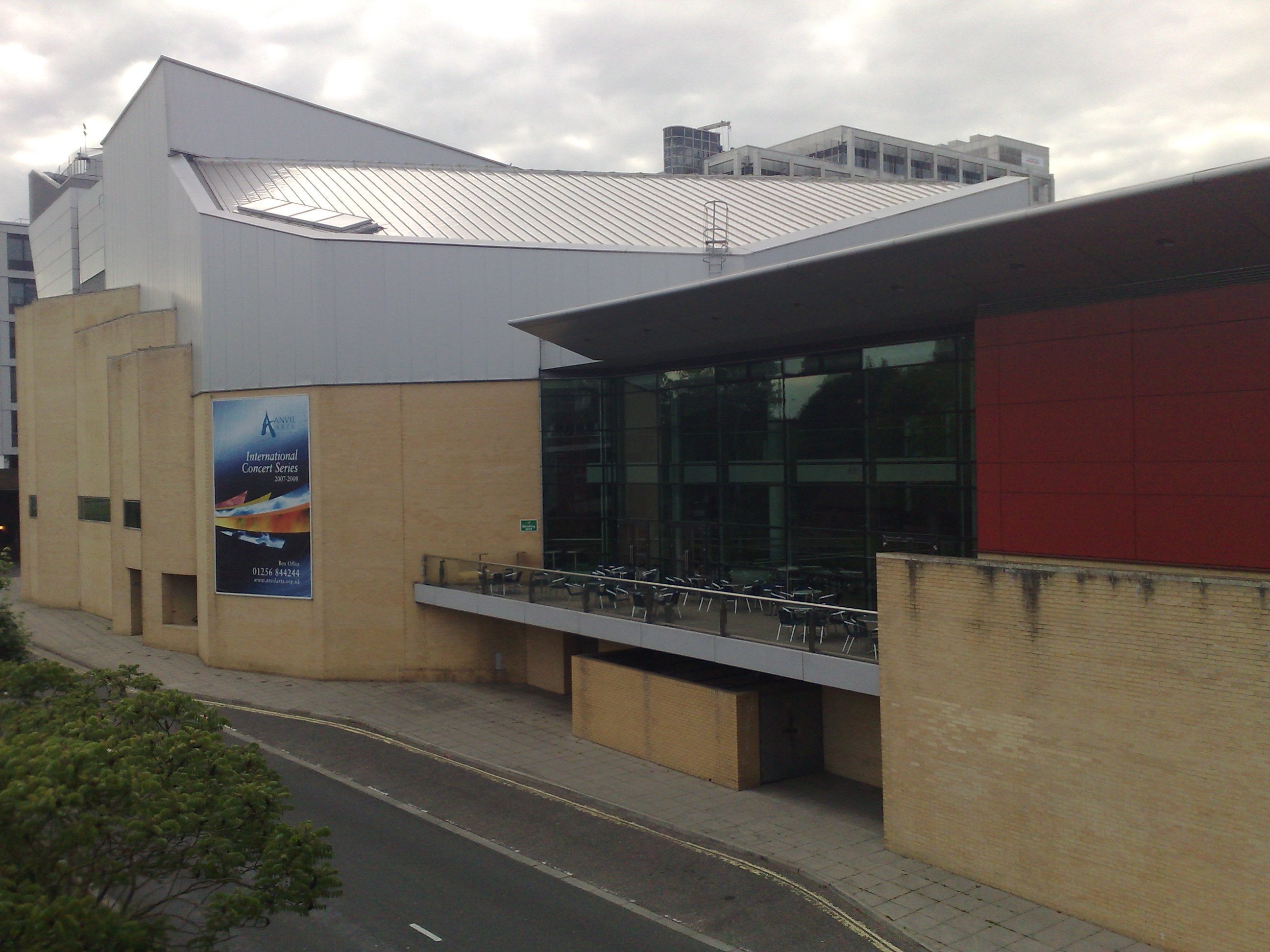
- The Anvil, Basingstoke in 2008. View of the south side of the theatre from the footbridge over Churchill Way.
- Interactive map of The Anvil
- Address: Churchill Way; Basingstoke
- Coordinates: 51.266677°N 1.088933°W
- Owner: The Anvil Trust Ltd., Registered Charity
- Capacity: 1100 (The Anvil); 400 (The Haymarket); 95 (The Forge)
- Type: Multi-purpose venue

Construction
- Opened: April 1994
- Architect: Philip Christodoulou of RHWL

Website
- www.anvilarts.org.uk

The Anvil is a concert hall and performing arts centre in the town of Basingstoke in Hampshire, UK. The building's name reflects its unusual shape, particularly when seen from the western approach, as it resembles the horn end of a traditional blacksmith's anvil. It has also been likened to the bow of a ship.

The Anvil was built to tackle what was then seen as a 'cultural desert' in the Basingstoke area, on a site originally set aside for the third phase of Basingstoke's shopping centre. The aim of the project was to raise the profile of the Borough and to establish it as a major regional centre with a range of first-class facilities. It opened in 1994.

== Performances ==
The hall plays host to a variety of touring productions, stand-up comedians, live bands, opera, and most famously classical music. The hall is designed to be multi-purpose, and has multiple stage formats that fit shows according to their needs, plus a removable proscenium to cater for more theatrical performances that require more than a standard 'black box' stage, notably opera and pantomime. The auditorium has adjustable seating and considered some of the finest acoustics of any concert hall in Europe. The acoustic design was by Richard Cowell of Arup Acoustics.

There is a small second auditorium, The Forge, which primarily plays host to acoustic and folk acts.

The Anvil Arts International Concert Series takes place at the venue with performances by the BBC Symphony Orchestra.

In 2026, the Philharmonia Orchestra performed its 80th birthday finale celebrations at The Anvil.
