= Pavilion Theatre, Bournemouth =

Concert hall in Bournemouth, England

Bournemouth Pavilion Theatre and Ballroom
- The Pavilion Theatre from the south.
- Interactive map of Bournemouth Pavilion Theatre and Ballroom
- Address: Westover Road; Bournemouth BH1 2BU; England
- Coordinates: 50°43′04″N 1°52′29″W
- Owner: Bournemouth, Christchurch and Poole Council
- Operator: BH Live
- Capacity: 1,448 (Theatre); 900 (Ballroom)

Construction
- Opened: 19 March 1929
- Renovated: 1934, 1975, 2007
- Cost: £250,000 (£13.1 million in 2025 prices)
- Architects: Home and Knight

Website
- Venue Website

Listed Building – Grade II
- Official name: The Pavilion Theatre and surrounding raised terrace and steps
- Designated: 19 January 1998
- Reference no.: 1376801

The Pavilion Theatre and Ballroom is a concert hall in Bournemouth. It opened in 1929 and has been redesigned several times since.

== History ==
The area around Bournemouth Gardens was granted permission by the owners in 1859 to incorporate a public pleasure ground. Discussions for a fixed entertainment venue took place during the 1880s, and as part of the 1892 Bournemouth Improvement Act, the council were granted £20,000 for constructing a pavilion in the gardens, which could accommodate a municipal orchestra. These plans were continually blocked by local residents who felt that licensed premises for drinking were immoral. A fixed plan for a venue in the gardens was approved in 1908, but saw further delays and was consequently postponed until after World War I.

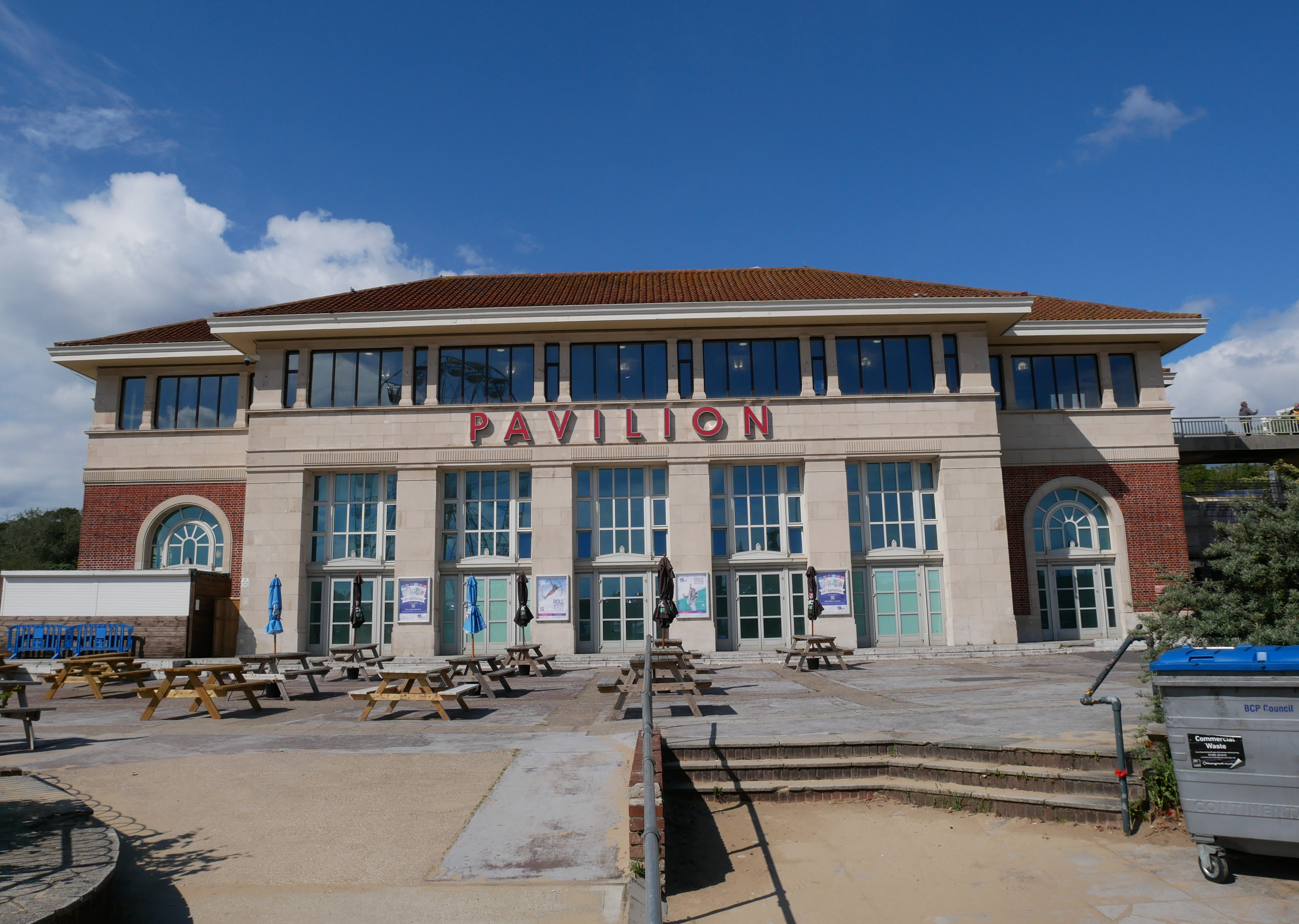
The south face of the Pavilion Theatre

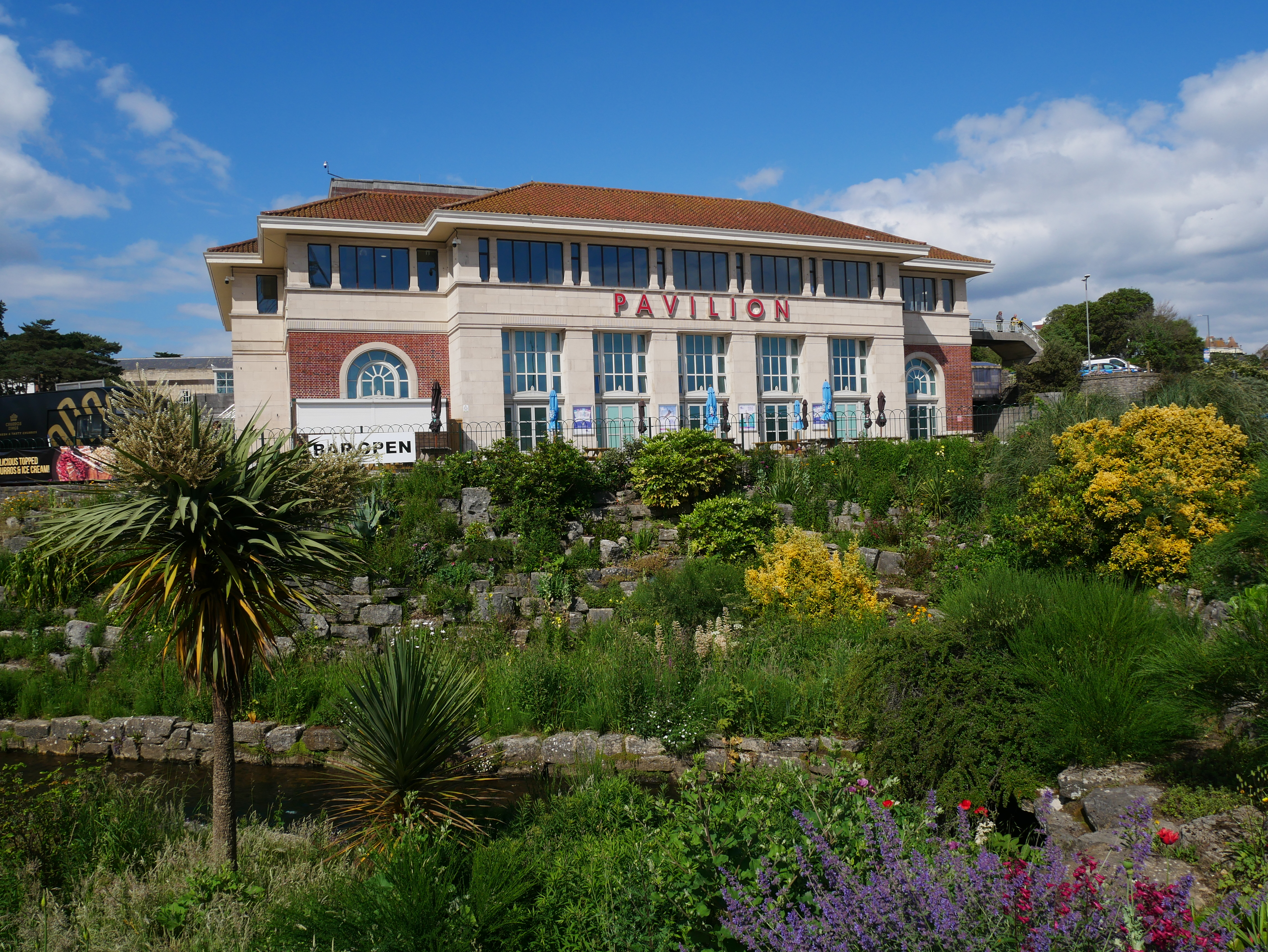
The Pavilion Theatre surrounded by the Lower Gardens of Bournemouth

By the 1920s, the orchestra felt that the Bournemouth Winter Gardens was no longer a suitable venue and requested a more accommodating hall be built. In 1923, a competition was held to design the concert room, chaired by Edwin Cooper. The winners were by G Wyville Home and Shirley Knight, whose design was consulted with Owen Williams. Construction began in September 1925 with the laying of the foundation stone. On 19 March 1929, the building was opened by the Duke of Gloucester. It had cost £250,000.

In the early 1930s, the Pavilion was rebuilt to accommodate theatrical productions as well as orchestras. It re-opened with a production of The White Horse Inn on 7 July 1934. Several alterations were undertaken in the 1950s, including the addition of two storeys to either side of the main entrance. In 1975, the Oasis Bar was added as a western extension of the hall. This proved to be unpopular, and was demolished in 2007 when the theatre underwent a £12 million restoration programme.

The building was Grade II listed on 19 January 1998. It is currently owned by Bournemouth, Christchurch and Poole Council and managed by BH Live. The Pavilion operates alongside its sister venue, the Bournemouth International Centre.

In 2019, comedian Lenny Henry complained that a historical photograph in the Pavilion's dressing room, showing actors in blackface, was outdated, racist and offensive. A spokesman for the pavilion apologised.
