= Regent Theatre, Ipswich =

Theatre and concert venue in Suffolk, England

Coordinates: 52.0573°N 1.1603°E

- Ipswich Regent Theatre, Ipswich Regent, The Regent
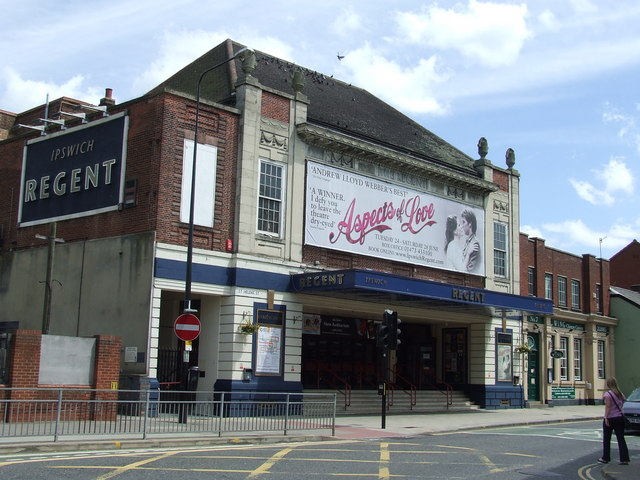
- The theatre from Carr Street
- Interactive map of Regent Theatre, Ipswich
- Former names: Gaumont Theatre, Odeon
- Address: Regent Theatre, 3 St. Helen’s St, Ipswich, IP4 1HE; United Kingdom
- Owner: Ipswich Borough Council
- Capacity: 1551
- Type: Theatre

Construction
- Opened: 4 November 1929
- Years active: 94
- Architect: William Edward Trent

Website
- www.ipswichtheatres.co.uk

Ipswich Regent Theatre (formerly known as the Gaumont Theatre) is a theatre and concert venue located at St Helen's Street in Ipswich, Suffolk, England. The auditorium was refurbished in 2007 and now holds 1,551 people, having reduced the capacity by 150 to accommodate larger and more comfortable seating. It is East Anglia's largest theatre. It has also been known as the Gaumont Theatre. It was designated as a Grade II listed building in 2000.

== History ==
The Regent Theatre opened in 1929 as a 'cine-variety hall' and was among the first UK theatres to play films with sound. Designed by William Edward Trent, it was extremely luxurious, with a restaurant, 14 boxes, a resident Wurlitzer organ and organist and an 18-piece orchestra. Unusually, a manager's cottage was incorporated into the theatre design.

During World War II the theatre was used to stage concerts and civic events, as well as ballet and opera. During the 1950s and 1960s it hosted many top acts, including Buddy Holly and the Crickets and The Beatles. The Rolling Stones performed at the Gaumont Theatre in 1964, and with Ike & Tina Turner and The Yardbirds in 1966. Status Quo, Gene Pitney, The Hollies, The Small Faces, Roy Orbison, The Walker Brothers and Jimi Hendrix also played there.

In the 1970s and 1980s – when it was known as the Gaumont Theatre – it hosted many punk and new wave acts, including The Clash, Ian Dury and The Blockheads, Elvis Costello, The Stranglers, Siouxsie and the Banshees, Gary Numan, and the Boomtown Rats.. It also hosted Genesis in 1980, and Mike Oldfield at the peak of his career. In 1987 it was renamed the Odeon, and closed as a cinema in March 1991.

== The theatre today ==
Ipswich Borough Council took the theatre on following controversy over its future, reopening it as Regent Theatre on 21 September 1991. It was given a Grade II listing in 2000. In 2009, the Regent Theatre celebrated its 80th birthday with a gala concert featuring Lesley Garrett and the Royal Philharmonic Orchestra.

== Architecture ==
Architecturally, the Regent Theatre is a steel-framed building with precast concrete floors and brickwork, fronted by a two-storey neo-Georgian façade. The entrance elevation features a central section of brown brick with three first-floor windows set beneath an enriched stone cornice, approached via a full-width flight of stone steps and canopy. This is flanked by narrow stone pavilions with rusticated ground-floor detailing, display recesses and urns at parapet level; a matching two-storey bay to the left originally served as the entrance for cheaper seats.

Internally, the auditorium retains much of its 1929 form and decorative treatment, although the original Wurlitzer organ and associated grilles have been removed. When Ipswich Borough Council acquired the building in 1991, restoration works reversed several alterations from its cinema years, added new dressing rooms and a get-in, and carried out redecoration and re-equipping of backstage areas. The stage grid remains tight to the flytower roof, reflecting the building’s original cine-variety design.

== Backstage redevelopment (2023) ==
In 2023 Ipswich Borough Council completed a £300,000 redevelopment of the Regent Theatre’s backstage facilities to increase capacity and improve the quality of facilities for touring productions. The project, constructed as a modular extension on part of the theatre’s production area car park and linked to the main building, introduced additional dressing rooms, expanded wardrobe and catering space, and improved welfare facilities for performers and production crews.

The extension was officially opened in November 2023 by the Mayor of Ipswich, Councillor Lynne Mortimer. The improvements were intended to address long-standing space limitations that had previously restricted the size of shows the venue could accommodate. The new facilities allow the 1,551-seat theatre to host larger touring productions and provide modern amenities for visiting companies.

Despite this enhanced backstage accommodation, the theatre’s capacity to host large-scale productions remains constrained by its original design as a cine-variety hall. The Regent Theatre does not have a fly tower or comprehensive counterweight flying system, and its stage and wing spaces are comparatively limited by modern touring standards. These inherent structural factors continue to be the primary limitations on the size and complexity of productions that the venue can accommodate.

== Front of house refurbishment (2025) ==
Planning approval for a major front-of-house redevelopment of the Regent Theatre was granted by Ipswich Borough Council in December 2024. Designed by KLH Architects, the £3.45 million project forms the second phase of a wider modernisation programme intended to enhance accessibility, visitor facilities and the theatre’s long-term sustainability while retaining its Art Deco character. The works were completed by local contractor Mixbrow Construction in February 2025.

The theatre closed in May 2025 for the works, which took seven months to complete and were financed entirely through a £1.70 restoration levy introduced on tickets in 2023. The scheme included a new single-storey extension at the end of the theatre's Crush Hall, housing expanded toilet facilities, a Changing Places unit, upgraded gents’ toilets, new office space and improved fire-escape routes. Further improvements included a refurbished accessible entrance, installation of a lift to the Circle Lounge, restoration of original 1929 features in the foyer and public areas, enlarged bar spaces, and sustainability upgrades such as improved insulation, modern heating and cooling systems, and water-efficient fittings.

The Theatres Trust welcomed the improvements as “much-needed” enhancements to accessibility and audience facilities, noting that the extension and lift would “further enhance the Regent’s social value” while remaining sensitive to the building’s heritage.

The redevelopment also reinstated Art Deco-inspired exterior lighting and canopy features and introduced a “Wall of Fame” celebrating the theatre’s performance history. The refurbished building was officially reopened by the Mayor of Ipswich, Stefan Long, at a special event on 28 November 2025.
