= Jamaica at the 2025 World Aquatics Championships =

- Flag of Jamaica
- World Aquatics code: JAM
- National federation: Aquatic Sports Association of Jamaica
- Website: swimjamaica.com

in Singapore
- Competitors: 3 in 1 sport
- Medals: Gold 0 Silver 0 Bronze 0 Total 0

World Aquatics Championships appearances
- 1973; 1975; 1978; 1982; 1986; 1991; 1994; 1998; 2001; 2003; 2005; 2007; 2009; 2011; 2013; 2015; 2017; 2019; 2022; 2023; 2024; 2025

Jamaica is competing at the 2025 World Aquatics Championships in Singapore from 11 July to 3 August 2025.

== Competitors ==
The following is the list of competitors in the Championships.

Sport	Men	Women	Total
Swimming	2	1	3
Total	2	1	3

== Swimming ==
Men

Athlete	Event	Heat		Semifinal		Final	
Athlete	Event	Time	Rank	Time	Rank	Time	Rank
Kito Campbell	50 m breaststroke	28.28	49	Did not advance			
Kito Campbell	100 m breaststroke	1:03.09	49	Did not advance			
Josh Kirlew	50 m butterfly	24.95	55	Did not advance			
Josh Kirlew	100 m butterfly	53.68	42	Did not advance			

Women

Athlete	Event	Heat		Semifinal		Final	
Athlete	Event	Time	Rank	Time	Rank	Time	Rank
Jessica Calderbank	50 m butterfly	27.50	42	Did not advance			
Jessica Calderbank	100 m butterfly	1:01.62	38	Did not advance			
