= Gaydio Awards =

Annual British LGBTQ+ award ceremony

- Awarded for: LGBTQ+ contributions in the UK
- Location: Manchester Deansgate Hotel
- Country: United Kingdom
- First award: 2023; 3 years ago
- Website: gaydioprideawards.co.uk

The Gaydio Awards are an annual awards ceremony in the United Kingdom which honours LGBTQ+ contributions in the United Kingdom. The awards are presented by radio station Gaydio and first took place as the Gaydio Pride Awards in 2023, held at the Manchester Deansgate Hotel. Hosted annually since, it celebrates LGBTQ+ life across the UK. The ceremonies award various categories, as well as having a "big 4", which are decided by a panel. The "big 4" consist of Gaydio Icon, Lifetime Achievement, Outstanding Entertainment Contribution and Music Artist of the Year. The Gaydio Awards also host various performers at each ceremony and have included Raye, Becky Hill, Louisa Johnson, XO, Katy B, Tulisa and Bailey J Mills.

== 2023 ==
The inaugural Gaydio Awards were held on 10 February 2023. The Music Artist of the Year accolade was given to Cat Burns, who said it was "super important" for her to be visible as a queer artist. The Lifetime Contribution award was given to Peter Tatchell, a human rights campaigner who was arrested in Qatar for promoting the dangers for LGBTQ+ people throughout the 2022 FIFA World Cup. Manchester Pride, Pride in London, Birmingham Pride and Brighton and Hove Pride were also given a collective accolade for Major Pride of the Year for condemning the World Cup being held in Qatar.

=== Performers ===
- Danny Beard
- Raye
- Sigala

=== Winners and nominees ===
Major Pride of the Year	Grassroots Pride of the Year
Manchester Pride, Pride in London, Birmingham Pride and Brighton and Hove Pride	Trans Pride Brighton; UK Black Pride; Chesterfield Pride; Salford Pride; Prestwich Pride
Volunteer of the Year	Employee Pride Network of the Year
Joel Mordi; Michele Raph; Charlie Watts	Birmingham Women's and Children's NHS Trust LGBTQ+ Staff Network; Proud@Shell UK; Proud at Deloitte; Bruntwood's LGBTQIA++ Network; Co-Op Respect; JET & Proud
LGBTQ+ Club or Sports Team of the Year	Venue or Event of the Year
Trans Radio UK Football Club; Manchester Village Spartans; Leicester Diamonds Baseball Club; Outdoor Lads; Gay Outdoor Club	Filthy Gorgeous, The Brewers, Manchester; The House of Bridget, Bury; Swagga, Manchester; Arch, Clapham; The Werkroom, Stoke-on-Trent; Planet Bar, Edinburgh
Charity of the Year	LGBTQ+ Champion
George House Trust; Spencer Trust; Fighting with Pride	Janusz Domagala; Aida H Dee; Carley Owen
Music Artist of the Year	Lifetime Contribution
Cat Burns	Peter Tatchell

== 2024 ==
The 2024 Gaydio Awards were held on 16 February 2024. The ceremony introduced various new categories, including Outstanding Entertainment Contribution, which was awarded to actor Layton Williams. Lady Phyll, the co-founder and chief executive of UK Black Pride, was honoured with the Lifetime Achievement accolade, while Becky Hill won the Music Artist of the Year award. Speaking on her win, Hill said: "Ever since coming out as queer, I have tried to put queerness at the core of everything I do; touring with some incredible drag acts whilst putting the trans and drag community at the forefront of my live shows. Support like this really means the world".

=== Performers ===
- Caity Baser
- Jazzy
- Ginger Johnson
- Tia Kofi
- Talia Mar

=== Winners and nominees ===
Pride Organisation of the Year	Grassroots Pride of the Year
Bristol Pride; Leicester Pride; Warwickshire Pride	Trans Pride Hastings; Chippenham Pride; Arran Pride
Volunteer of the Year	Pride Network of the Year
Alice-Louise Wallace; Daniel Browne; Phil Gale	LGBT+ Network NHS Blood and Transplant; Compass Network; Co-Op Respect; Pride@B&Q; NSPCC PINCC
LGBTQ+ Club or Sports Team of the Year	Venue or Event of the Year
Transmanian Devils; Cardiff Lions; Keighley Cougars	Vanilla; The Future is Queer; Your Dad Sells Avon
Charity of the Year	LGBTQ+ Enterprise Award
Opening Doors; Just Like Us; Stonewall Housing	Pop n Olly; West London Queer Project; Somewhere: For Us; Lunch Positive
Influencer of the Year	LGBTQ+ Young Business Person of the Year
Lucky Roy Singh; Dee Whitnell; Eva Echo	Emily Waldron; Anna Furnivall; Kimberly Malone Crossley
Music Artist of the Year	Hilton LGBTQ+ Champion
Becky Hill	Richard Flinn
Outstanding Entertainment Contribution	Lifetime Achievement
Layton Williams	Lady Phyll

== 2025 ==
The 2025 Gaydio Awards were held on 14 March 2025. It paid homage to drag performer The Vivienne, who died earlier that year. It also saw the introduction of the Gaydio Icon accolade, which honoured screenwriter and producer Russell T Davies. American singer Chappell Roan won Music Artist of the Year, while Lisa Power MBE, known for her LGBTQ+ rights campaigning, was honoured with the Lifetime Achievement award.

=== Performers ===
- Katy B
- DearALICE
- La Voix
- Tulisa

=== Winners and nominees ===
Pride Organisation of the Year	Pride Network of the Year
Manchester Pride; Leeds Pride; Rotherham Pride	Manchester University NHS Foundation Trust LGBTQ+ Network; Co-Op Respect/Prism Network; Octopus Energy Pride Network
Volunteer of the Year	Charity of the Year
Rob Wilson; Mathew Dyson; Matthew Fuller	AKT; Rainbow Migration; OUTPatients
Sports Team of the Year	Enterprise Award
London Titans; Newcastle Frontrunners; Bristol Swifts	The Weekending; Hummingbird Heels; Lesflicks
Venue of the Year	Event of the Year
New York New York, Manchester; The Scene, Lincoln; Rainbow & Dove, Leicester	UK Black Pride; T4T; Mighty Hoopla
Influencer of the Year	Outstanding Entertainment Contribution
Logan Brown; Ali Bromley; Darren Pritchard	Simon Jones
Music Artist of the Year	Lifetime Achievement
Chappell Roan	Lisa Power
Gaydio Icon
Russell T Davies

== 2026 ==
The 2026 Gaydio Awards were held on 20 March 2026. It introduced various new categories, including Queer Arts & Culture, LGBTQ+ Podcast of the Year and the Queer Media accolade. Singer Jade was announced as their Music Artist of the Year, while ITV1 soap opera Coronation Street was honoured with Outstanding Entertainment Contribution for their domestic abuse storyline between boyfriends Todd Grimshaw (Gareth Pierce) and Theo Silverton (James Cartwright). DJ Paulette was awarded the Lifetime Achievement accolade, with television personality Ella Morgan billed the Gaydio Icon of 2026.

=== Performers ===
- Yshee Black
- Dave Cooper
- Louisa Johnson
- Meek
- Bailey J Mills
- Helen Scott
- XO

=== Winners and nominees ===
Pride Organisation of the Year	Pride Network of the Year
Great Yarmouth and Waveney Pride; Happy Valley Pride; Trans Pride Brighton	BT Pride Network; Intermedia UK; PINCC – NSPCC; Tesco Pride Network; Universal Pride Network; Worldpay Pride Network
Volunteer of the Year	Charity of the Year
Daniel Browne; Andrew Waite; Shell Buckle	Not a Phase; Sahir; Proud2bParents
Sports Club of the Year	Enterprise Award
Village Manchester FC; Ishigaki Jujitsu; London Royals Hockey Club	Bootyque; Grounded MCR; Queerify
Venue of the Year	Event of the Year
Corset Club, Glasgow; Eagle, Manchester; Scene, Lincoln	Out & Wild Festival; Cardiff Lions Drag Rugby; Sparkle
Influencer of the Year	Queer Arts & Culture
Alexis & Liam Blake; Ali Najjar & Adam Imber; Johnathan Zemlik; Bimini	Queer Britain Museum; Queer East; BFI Flare
LGBTQ+ Podcast of the Year	Queer Media
The Pieces with Bimini; The Gossip Gays; Proudly Said	We'll Go Down In History; Koupepia; Dear Viv
Music Artist of the Year	Outstanding Entertainment Contribution
Jade	Coronation Street's LGBTQ+ Domestic Abuse Storyline
Lifetime Achievement	Gaydio Icon
DJ Paulette	Ella Morgan
