= Jamaica at the 2017 World Aquatics Championships =

- Flag of Jamaica
- FINA code: JAM
- National federation: Amateur Swimming Association of Jamaica
- Website: www.swimjamaica.com

in Budapest, Hungary
- Competitors: 3 in 2 sports
- Medals: Gold 0 Silver 0 Bronze 0 Total 0

World Aquatics Championships appearances
- 1973; 1975; 1978; 1982; 1986; 1991; 1994; 1998; 2001; 2003; 2005; 2007; 2009; 2011; 2013; 2015; 2017; 2019; 2022; 2023; 2024

Jamaica competed at the 2017 World Aquatics Championships in Budapest, Hungary from 14 July to 30 July.

== Diving ==
Jamaica has entered 1 diver (one male).

Athlete	Event	Preliminaries		Semifinals		Final	
Athlete	Event	Points	Rank	Points	Rank	Points	Rank
Yona Knight-Wisdom	Men's 1 m springboard	310.25	32	—		did not advance	
Yona Knight-Wisdom	Men's 3 m springboard	385.00	29	did not advance			

== Swimming ==
Jamaica has received a Universality invitation from FINA to send two male swimmers to the World Championships.

Athlete	Event	Heat		Semifinal		Final	
Athlete	Event	Time	Rank	Time	Rank	Time	Rank
Michael Gunning	Men's 200 m freestyle	1:50.00	43	did not advance			
Michael Gunning	Men's 200 m butterfly	2:01.73	36	did not advance			
Justin Plaschka	Men's 50 m freestyle	22.93	=49	did not advance			
Justin Plaschka	Men's 50 m butterfly	24.63	=41	did not advance			
