= Jamaica at the 2013 World Aquatics Championships =

- Flag of Jamaica
- World Aquatics code: JAM
- National federation: Amateur Swimming Association of Jamaica
- Website: www.swimjamaica.com

in Barcelona, Spain
- Competitors: 3 in 2 sports
- Medals: Gold 0 Silver 0 Bronze 0 Total 0

World Aquatics Championships appearances
- 1973; 1975; 1978; 1982; 1986; 1991; 1994; 1998; 2001; 2003; 2005; 2007; 2009; 2011; 2013; 2015; 2017; 2019; 2022; 2023; 2024; 2025

Jamaica is competing at the 2013 World Aquatics Championships in Barcelona, Spain between 19 July and 4 August 2013.

== Diving ==
Jamaica qualified a single quota for the following diving events.

Men

Athlete	Event	Preliminaries		Semifinals		Final	
Athlete	Event	Points	Rank	Points	Rank	Points	Rank
Yona Knight-Wisdom	1 m springboard	311.55	23	—N/a		did not advance	
Yona Knight-Wisdom	3 m springboard	339.30	34	did not advance			

== Swimming ==
Jamaican swimmers achieved qualifying standards in the following events (up to a maximum of 2 swimmers in each event at the A-standard entry time, and 1 at the B-standard):

Women

Athlete	Event	Heat		Semifinal		Final	
Athlete	Event	Time	Rank	Time	Rank	Time	Rank
Alia Atkinson	50 m breaststroke	31.12	10 Q	31.27	12	did not advance	
Alia Atkinson	100 m breaststroke	1:07.76	10 Q	1:07.63	9	did not advance	
Alia Atkinson	200 m breaststroke	2:31.49	22	did not advance			
Zara Bailey	200 m individual medley	2:18.88	36	did not advance			
Zara Bailey	400 m individual medley	4:54.14	27	—N/a		did not advance	
