= Jamaica at the 2019 World Aquatics Championships =

- Flag of Jamaica
- FINA code: JAM
- National federation: Amateur Swimming Association of Jamaica
- Website: www.swimjamaica.com

in Gwangju, South Korea
- Competitors: 4 in 2 sports
- Medals: Gold 0 Silver 0 Bronze 0 Total 0

World Aquatics Championships appearances
- 1973; 1975; 1978; 1982; 1986; 1991; 1994; 1998; 2001; 2003; 2005; 2007; 2009; 2011; 2013; 2015; 2017; 2019; 2022; 2023; 2024

Jamaica competed at the 2019 World Aquatics Championships in Gwangju, South Korea from 12 to 28 July.

== Diving ==
Jamaica has entered one diver.

Men

Athlete	Event	Preliminaries		Semifinals		Final	
Athlete	Event	Points	Rank	Points	Rank	Points	Rank
Yona Knight-Wisdom	1 m springboard	354.30	11 Q	—		371.90	10
Yona Knight-Wisdom	3 m springboard	390.20	20	did not advance			

== Swimming ==
Jamaica has entered three swimmers.

Men

Athlete	Event	Heat		Semifinal		Final	
Athlete	Event	Time	Rank	Time	Rank	Time	Rank
Keanan Dols	100 m butterfly	55.66	52	did not advance			
Keanan Dols	200 m individual medley	2:05.18	38	did not advance			
Michael Gunning	200 m freestyle	1:51.14	42	did not advance			
Michael Gunning	200 m butterfly	2:02.89	39	did not advance			

Women

Athlete	Event	Heat		Semifinal		Final	
Athlete	Event	Time	Rank	Time	Rank	Time	Rank
Alia Atkinson	50 m breaststroke	30.53	4 Q	30.61	5 Q	30.34	4
Alia Atkinson	100 m breaststroke	1:07.25	8 Q	1:07.11	=11	did not advance	
Alia Atkinson	50 m butterfly	27.49	36	did not advance			
