= Jamaica at the 2024 World Aquatics Championships =

- Flag of Jamaica
- FINA code: JAM
- National federation: Aquatic Sports Association of Jamaica
- Website: swimjamaica.com

in Doha, Qatar
- Competitors: 6 in 2 sports
- Medals: Gold 0 Silver 0 Bronze 0 Total 0

World Aquatics Championships appearances
- 1973; 1975; 1978; 1982; 1986; 1991; 1994; 1998; 2001; 2003; 2005; 2007; 2009; 2011; 2013; 2015; 2017; 2019; 2022; 2023; 2024

Jamaica competed at the 2024 World Aquatics Championships in Doha, Qatar from 2 to 18 February.

== Competitors ==
The following is the list of competitors in the Championships.

Sport	Men	Women	Total
Diving	2	0	2
Swimming	2	2	4
Total	4	2	6

== Diving ==
Men

Athlete	Event	Preliminaries		Semifinals		Final	
Athlete	Event	Points	Rank	Points	Rank	Points	Rank
Yohan Eskrick-Parkinson	3 m springboard	250.65	61	Did not advance			
Yona Knight-Wisdom	3 m springboard	385.65	11 Q	368.95	14	Did not advance	
Yohan Eskrick-Parkinson; Yona Knight-Wisdom	3 m synchro springboard	—				337.17	13

== Swimming ==
Jamaica entered 4 swimmers.

Men

Athlete	Event	Heat		Semifinal		Final	
Athlete	Event	Time	Rank	Time	Rank	Time	Rank
Josh Kirlew	100 metre butterfly	54.75	41	Did not advance			
Josh Kirlew	200 metre individual medley	Disqualified		Did not advance			
Sidrell Williams	50 metre freestyle	24.27	67	Did not advance			
Sidrell Williams	100 metre freestyle	52.76	74	Did not advance			

Women

Athlete	Event	Heat		Semifinal		Final	
Athlete	Event	Time	Rank	Time	Rank	Time	Rank
Jessica Calderbank	50 metre butterfly	27.47	32	Did not advance			
Jessica Calderbank	100 metre butterfly	1:01.82	29	Did not advance			
Emily Macdonald	50 metre freestyle	26.55	46	Did not advance			
Emily Macdonald	100 metre freestyle	57.57	33	Did not advance			
