= Josh Rivers =

English communications professional (born 1986)

- Born: Bedford, Bedfordshire, England
- Education: London College of Fashion, Norcross High School
- Occupations: Communications professional, podcaster, public figure, and writer
- Website: https://www.busybeingblack.com

Josh Rivers (born 1986) is a communications professional, podcaster, writer and public figure. He is the creator and host of the award-winning podcast Busy Being Black and the head of communications for UK Black Pride, Europe's largest pride celebration for LGBTQ people of colour. His writing has been published in Tenth Magazine, Black Youth Project, Huffington Post, El Champ, and Phoenix Magazine. In 2021, he starred in Just Like Me, a documentary celebrating queer people of colour for Visible Film Festival, from filmmaker Nelly Rodrigues.

== Career ==
From 2009 to 2013, Rivers worked across front and house and membership for Soho House Group. In 2014, he was hired as part of the founding team of Second Home, a membership-led workspace in East London. He joined Gay Times as Marketing Manager in January 2017 and in October of that year, became the first Black editor in the magazine's 43-year history. From September 2018 to September 2019, he was the Director of Communications for BAME sexual health charity Naz Project London. As of November 2020, he is the communications manager for Kaleidoscope Trust, a UK-based charity working to uphold the human rights of LGBT+ people across the Commonwealth.

== Busy Being Black ==
Rivers launched Busy Being Black in March 2018 as "a place where we bring ourselves, in our truest form, in order to inspire, motivate and educate our community."

In 2020, he received funding from Wellcome Trust and the British Podcast Awards Fund "to draw attention to the health inequalities and disparities experienced by queer Black people in the UK." The same year, he was awarded funding from the European Cultural Foundation to explore "queer Black solidarity across Europe during the COVID-19 crisis".

Busy Being Black was awarded Best Black LGBTQ Podcast at the 2021 Black Podcasting Awards.

== Controversy ==
Rivers was hired by Gay Times as marketing manager in January 2017 and promoted to editor in October of that year. In November 2017, he was fired from Gay Times after Buzzfeed UK reported that he had used his Twitter account in the past for tweets which were variously homophobic, racist, transphobic, antisemitic and body-shaming.

In September 2019, he was invited to speak at London Podcast Festival alongside Campbell X "to discuss his journey into audio, finding his confidence after such a public setback and the transformative impact of learning that we are not alone in our anger."

In October 2019, in an interview with Metro, Rivers said he "paid a dear price, but the right price, for [his] very public mistakes." He said "it's right that we speak up when someone makes a mistake. And the onus really is on the person who's made that mistake to go; 'I've really f***ed up, how can I make this better?'"

In June 2021, Gay Times invited Rivers onto the Media Watch podcast with political activist and whistleblower Shahmir Sanni to discuss cancel culture.
