= Jamaica at the 2023 World Aquatics Championships =

- Flag of Jamaica
- FINA code: JAM
- National federation: Aquatic Sports Association of Jamaica
- Website: swimjamaica.com

in Fukuoka, Japan
- Competitors: 3 in 2 sports
- Medals: Gold 0 Silver 0 Bronze 0 Total 0

World Aquatics Championships appearances
- 1973; 1975; 1978; 1982; 1986; 1991; 1994; 1998; 2001; 2003; 2005; 2007; 2009; 2011; 2013; 2015; 2017; 2019; 2022; 2023; 2024

Jamaica is set to compete at the 2023 World Aquatics Championships in Fukuoka, Japan from 14 to 30 July.

== Diving ==
Jamaica entered 2 divers.

Men

Athlete	Event	Preliminaries		Semifinal		Final	
Athlete	Event	Points	Rank	Points	Rank	Points	Rank
Yohan Eskrick-Parkinson	1 m springboard	277.05	45	—		did not advance	
Yohan Eskrick-Parkinson	3 m springboard	299.35	48	did not advance			
Yona Knight-Wisdom	1 m springboard	319.20	22	—		did not advance	
Yona Knight-Wisdom	3 m springboard	356.65	33	did not advance			
Yohan Eskrick-Parkinson; Yona Knight-Wisdom	3 m synchronized springboard	339.18	14	—		did not advance	

== Swimming ==
Jamaica entered 1 swimmer.

Women

Athlete	Event	Heat		Semifinal		Final	
Athlete	Event	Time	Rank	Time	Rank	Time	Rank
Sabrina Lyn	100 metre freestyle	59.38	43	Did not advance			
Sabrina Lyn	100 metre butterfly	1:02.13	36	Did not advance			
