= Kaleidoscope Trust =

Nonprofit organization for LGBT rights

- Formation: 13 September 2011; 15 years ago
- Legal status: Non-profit organisation
- Purpose: LGBT+ rights
- Headquarters: London, EC2A; United Kingdom
- Region served: Commonwealth; Worldwide
- Director: Alex Farrow
- Website: Kaleidoscope Trust

Kaleidoscope Trust is a nonprofit organisation that campaigns for the human rights of LGBT+ people around the world. Its mission is to help create a world where LGBT+ people are free, safe and equal everywhere. The Rt Hon. the Lord Fowler is President of the Trust, and Simon Millson is the current Chair of the Trust Board.

== History ==
Kaleidoscope Trust was founded in 2011, and launched with a reception held by then Speaker of the House of Commons, John Bercow MP. Kaleidoscope Trust has received support from former Prime Minister David Cameron, former Deputy Prime Minister Nick Clegg, and former Leader of the Opposition Ed Miliband. Elton John and George Michael were also supporters. Its current patrons are champion diver and TV personality Tom Daley; screenwriter, director and producer Dustin Lance Black; model and activist Munroe Bergdorf; fashion designer and stylist Kyle De'Volle; and former professional swimmer and media personality Michael Gunning.

Phyll Opoku-Gyimah joined Kaleidoscope Trust as Executive Director in August 2019. Opoku-Gyimah made history when she became the first black woman to head a leading LGBT+ organisation in the UK. A community builder and organiser, with strong ties to emergent LGBT+ movements around the world, Opoku-Gyimah is also the co-founder and executive director of UK Black Pride, dedicated to promoting "unity and co-operation among all Black people of African, Asian, Caribbean, Middle Eastern and Latin American descent, as well as their friends and families, who identify as Lesbian, Gay, Bisexual or Transgender." Opoku-Gyimah stepped down in December 2023 to take up the role of CEO at UK Black Pride.

In June 2024, Alex Farrow was appointed CEO of Kaleidoscope Trust.

Kaleidoscope Trust solicits public donations and receives funding from the UK, Canadian and Australian governments for its work in the Commonwealth.

== Activities ==
The organisation works with existing groups campaigning for LGBT+ groups in other countries by using international lobbying in order to better enable groups to achieve their aims. It is based in the UK, which places it ideally for campaigning for LGBT rights across all the Commonwealth countries, where (as at 2023) 32 of 54 states criminalise homosexual activity.

In March 2012, Kaleidoscope Trust was announced as the Official Charity Partner for World Pride 2012.

In 2018, Kaleidoscope Trust was instrumental in persuading then British Prime Minister Theresa May to express "deep regret" for the colonial-era laws that criminalise LGBT+ people.
