= Jamaica at the 2015 World Aquatics Championships =

- Flag of Jamaica
- World Aquatics code: JAM
- National federation: Amateur Swimming Association of Jamaica
- Website: www.swimjamaica.com

in Kazan, Russia
- Competitors: 4 in 2 sports
- Medals Ranked 25th: Gold 0 Silver 1 Bronze 1 Total 2

World Aquatics Championships appearances
- 1973; 1975; 1978; 1982; 1986; 1991; 1994; 1998; 2001; 2003; 2005; 2007; 2009; 2011; 2013; 2015; 2017; 2019; 2022; 2023; 2024; 2025

Jamaica competed at the 2015 World Aquatics Championships in Kazan, Russia from 24 July to 9 August 2015.

== Medalists ==
Medal	Name	Sport	Event	Date
Silver	Alia Atkinson	Swimming	Women's 50 m breaststroke	August 9
Bronze	Alia Atkinson	Swimming	Women's 100 m breaststroke	August 4

== Diving ==
Jamaican divers qualified for the individual spots at the World Championships.

Men

Athlete	Event	Preliminaries		Semifinals		Final	
Athlete	Event	Points	Rank	Points	Rank	Points	Rank
Yona Knight-Wisdom	1 m springboard	335.95	19	—N/a		did not advance	
Yona Knight-Wisdom	3 m springboard	356.30	37	did not advance			

== Swimming ==
Jamaican swimmers have achieved qualifying standards in the following events (up to a maximum of 2 swimmers in each event at the A-standard entry time, and 1 at the B-standard):

Men

Athlete	Event	Heat		Semifinal		Final	
Athlete	Event	Time	Rank	Time	Rank	Time	Rank
Sidrell Williams	50 m freestyle	25.15	59	did not advance			
Sidrell Williams	100 m freestyle	52.81	78	did not advance			
Timothy Wynter	50 m backstroke	27.21	52	did not advance			
Timothy Wynter	100 m backstroke	57.47	46	did not advance			

Women

Athlete	Event	Heat		Semifinal		Final	
Athlete	Event	Time	Rank	Time	Rank	Time	Rank
Alia Atkinson	50 m breaststroke	30.27	2 Q	30.78	6 Q	30.11	2nd place, silver medalist(s)
Alia Atkinson	100 m breaststroke	1:07.09	=8 Q	1:06.21	3 Q	1:06.42	3rd place, bronze medalist(s)
Alia Atkinson	50 m butterfly	27.01	=31	did not advance			
