= At the Beach LA =

LGBTQ event in Los Angeles, California

At The Beach, Los Angeles (ATBLA) is the organization that promotes and administers the Los Angeles Black gay pride event that occurs every summer. At The Beach is an annual beach party/Pride celebration which exists as the focal point for the black gay pride events, is the largest black gay pride event on the West Coast.

== See also ==
- LGBT culture in Los Angeles
- African-American LGBT community
- Black gay pride
- UK Black Pride
