= Jamaica at the 2022 World Aquatics Championships =

- Flag of Jamaica
- FINA code: JAM
- National federation: Amateur Swimming Association of Jamaica
- Website: www.swimjamaica.com

in Budapest, Hungary
- Competitors: 3 in 2 sports
- Medals: Gold 0 Silver 0 Bronze 0 Total 0

World Aquatics Championships appearances
- 1973; 1975; 1978; 1982; 1986; 1991; 1994; 1998; 2001; 2003; 2005; 2007; 2009; 2011; 2013; 2015; 2017; 2019; 2022; 2023; 2024

Jamaica competed at the 2022 World Aquatics Championships in Budapest, Hungary from 17 June to 3 July.

== Diving ==
Jamaica has entered one diver.

Men

| Athlete | Event | Preliminaries | | Semifinals | | Final | |
| Athlete | Event | Points | Rank | Points | Rank | Points | Rank |
|---|---|---|---|---|---|---|---|
| Yona Knight-Wisdom | 1 m springboard | 359.10 | 11 Q | — | | 370.90 | 7 |
| Yona Knight-Wisdom | 3 m springboard | 391.65 | 8 Q | 354.65 | 15 | did not advance | |

== Swimming ==
Jamaica has entered two swimmers.

Men

| Athlete | Event | Heat | | Semifinal | | Final | |
| Athlete | Event | Time | Rank | Time | Rank | Time | Rank |
|---|---|---|---|---|---|---|---|
| Kito Campbell | 50 m breaststroke | 29.06 | 39 | did not advance | | | |
| Kito Campbell | 100 m breaststroke | 1:05.27 | 52 | did not advance | | | |
| Keanan Dols | 200 m butterfly | 2:04.04 | 37 | did not advance | | | |
| Keanan Dols | 200 m medley | 2:08.24 | 36 | did not advance | | | |
