= Black gay pride =

Movement in the United States for Black people in the LGBTQ+ community

Popular pride flag variant; the black and brown stripes represent people of color, and the blue, pink and white are those of the trans pride flag.

The black gay pride movement is a global campaign tailored for black people who are also members of the LGBTQ community. Starting in the 1990s, black gay pride movements began as a way to provide black LGBT people an alternative to the largely white mainstream LGBT movement. According to some, white gay prides are seen to enforce, both consciously and unconsciously, a long history of ignoring the people of color who share in their experiences. The history of racial segregation seen in other organizations such as nursing associations, journalism associations, and fraternities is carried on into the black gay prides seen today. The exclusion of people of color in gay pride events is perceived by some to play into existing undertones of white superiority and racist political movements.

In response, the movement serves as a way for black LGBT people to discuss specific issues that are more unique to the black LGBT community and celebrate the progress of the black LGBT community. While the mainstream gay pride movement is often perceived as overwhelmingly white, the black gay pride movement has focused on issues such as racism, homophobia, and lack of proper health and mental care in black communities.

== Center for Black Equity ==
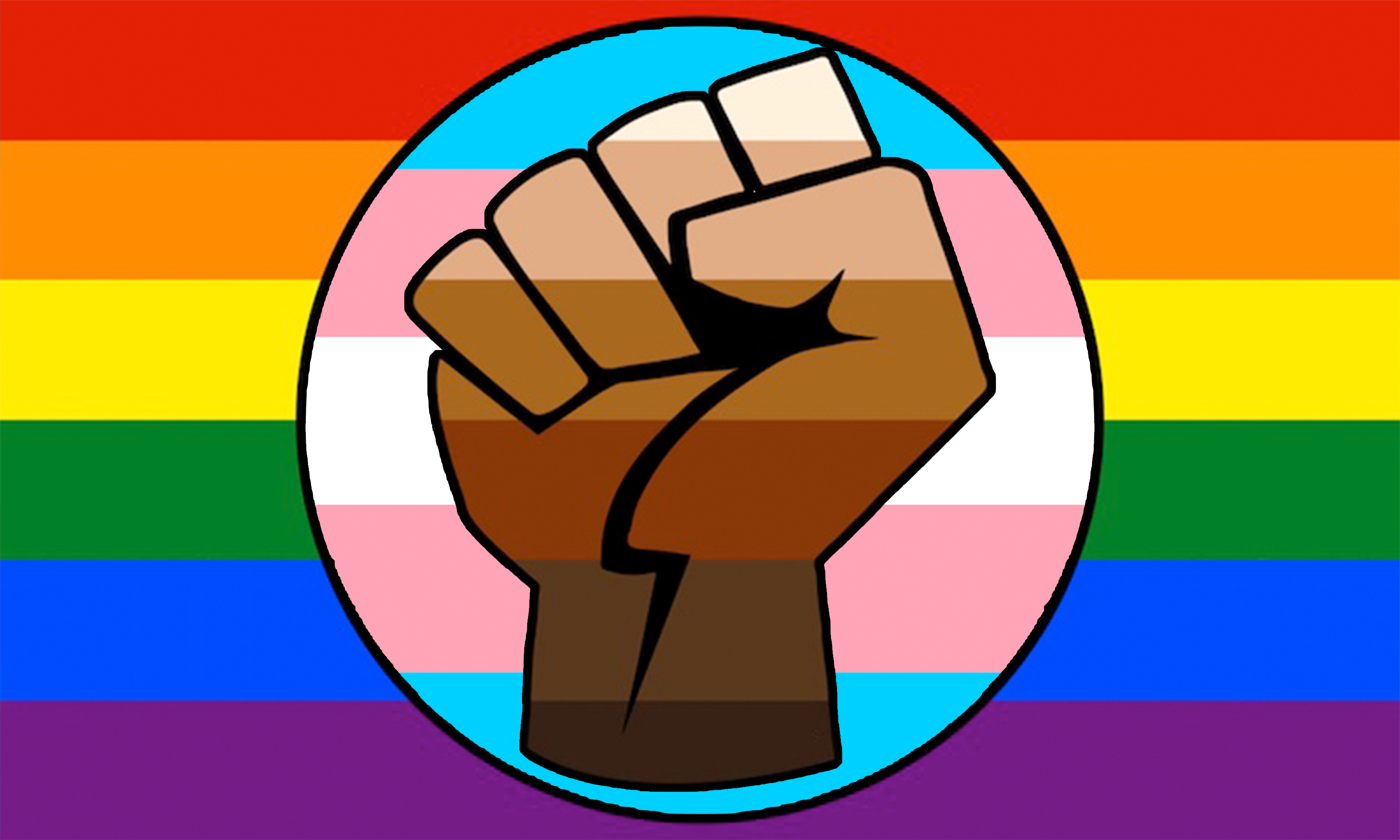
A pride flag emblazoned with a raised fist in brown stripes (in support of BLM) within a circle displaying the trans flag colors

Formerly known as the International Federation of Black Prides until 2012, the Center for Black Equity (CBE), is an international organization dedicated to equality and social justice for black LGBT people. On October 13, 2013, CBE president Earl Fowles, along with Congresswoman Eleanor Holmes Norton, announced a name change from IFBP to the Center for Black Equity. Though the organization began as a way to support the network of black gay pride celebrations worldwide, CBE now also focuses on social justice issues as well.

The International Federation of Black Prides started during DC Black Pride of May 1999 by a coalition of Black Pride organizers representing Chicago, North Carolina, New York City, Atlanta, Detroit, Minneapolis, and Washington, DC. The coalition saw a need to organize the twenty-plus Black Prides in the United States and abroad for the purpose of developing sponsorship strategies, providing technical assistance, networking, mentoring, and supporting one another. IFBP acquired its IRS 501(c)(3) non-profit status in November 2004.

== Most popular events ==
=== Africa ===
See also List of LGBTQ events - Africa.

==== South Africa ====
See Pride parades in South Africa.

=== Europe ===
==== United Kingdom ====
The largest Black gay pride in Europe is in the United Kingdom. The UK Black Pride began in 2005 and attracts over 25,000 people.

=== Americas ===
==== Canada ====
===== Montreal =====
Montreal will host its first Afro-Caribbean pride June 19–21, 2026.

===== Toronto =====
Blackness Yes! has organized Blockorama, Canada's largest Black LGBTQ celebration, as part of Toronto Pride since 1999. Additionally, they organize the Blockobana pride party as part of Toronto's Caribana celebrations in late July/early August every year. The first Blockobana took place in 2010 and has been the closing party of Toronto Black Pride Weekend since 2018.

==== Curaçao ====
Curaçao Pride takes place in Willemstad late September/early October.

==== Haiti ====
The Organisation Socio-Culturelle pour la Promotion des Droits Humains (OSCPDH) has organized the yearly pride event Festi-Fierté since 2022.

==== United States ====
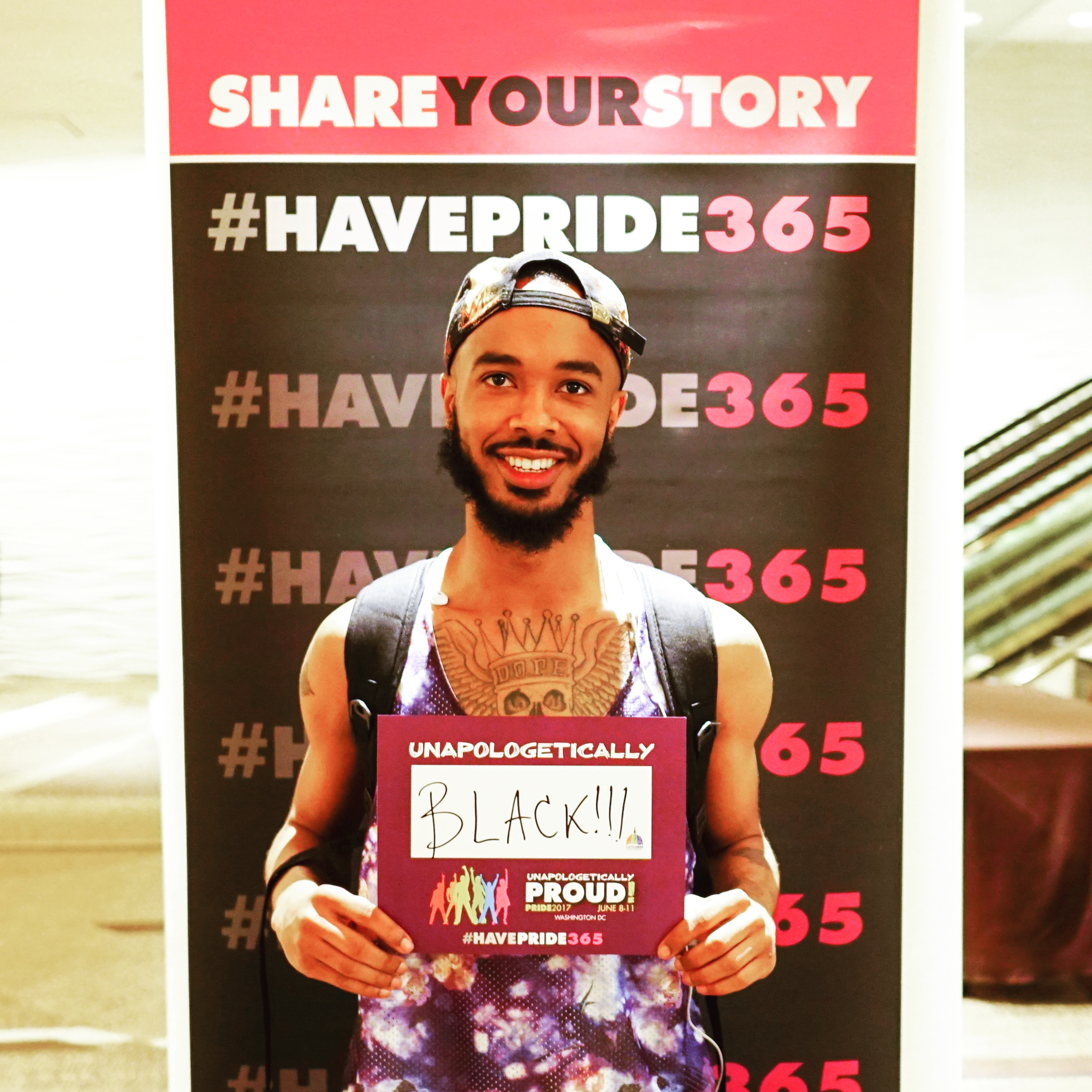
Attendee at the 2017 D.C. Black Pride event

Today, there are about 20 black gay pride events all over the United States. While black pride events started as early as 1988, D.C. Black Pride, which began in 1991, has been cited as one of the earliest celebrations. The D.C. Black Pride celebration started out of a tradition called the Children's Hour 15 years prior.

Most major cities such as Dallas, Houston, Charlotte, Memphis, Philadelphia, Seattle, Baltimore, St. Louis, Indianapolis, Detroit, Miami, Los Angeles, Chicago, Nashville, New Orleans, and New York City host relatively large black pride celebrations but the two largest are based in Atlanta, Georgia and Washington, D.C.

===== Atlanta Black Pride =====
Created in 1996, Atlanta Black Pride weekend (ABPW) is the only official event for the black LGBT community in Atlanta. The event was partially inspired by a group of black gay friends who decided to have annual Labor Day picnics together at Piedmont Park. It has grown to be the largest black gay pride event in the world with a plethora of events catering to the black LGBT community.

===== D.C. Black Pride =====
D.C. Black Pride is the earliest and the second-largest black LGBT pride event. The event first took place on Saturday, May 25, 1991, at Banneker Field. Like all black LGBT celebrations, it started because the community did not see themselves fairly represented during D.C's annual Capital Pride. Event sponsors include CBE and Capital Pride.

== See also ==
- Black pride
- At the Beach LA
- Dallas Black Pride
- Hotter than July (Detroit)
- UK Black Pride

General:

- African-American LGBT community
- Ball culture
- Bear (gay culture)
- Lesbian bar
- Gay bar
- House music
- J-Setting
- Circuit party
- Party and play
