= Logan Brown (activist) =

British trans rights activist

- Occupations: Blogger and residential children's support worker
- Known for: trans rights activist
- Awards: Gaydio Awards

Logan Brown is a British trans rights activist, blogger, and residential children's support worker. The ex-partner of non-binary drag performer Bailey J Mills, he is best known in the U.K. for having a child after having transitioned as a transgender man. Brown was featured on the cover of Glamour UK in 2023, whilst in his final trimester of pregnancy. The cover was for the magazine's Pride issue, and featured Brown in a body-painted suit, which referenced Demi Moore's famous 1992 cover photo for Vanity Fair, where Moore posed nude while pregnant.

== Biography ==
Brown initially came out as a lesbian, at the age of 13 and again as a transgender man at 21 to a supportive family. In February 2024, he told the Manchester Evening News “I didn’t realise the things I used to do, like bind my chest down, I was doing for a reason." Brown started hormone therapy. At 22 Brown had chest surgery to remove his breast tissue. He described the process as "just life-changing.” “It was everything I had always wanted." Brown met and began dating Bailey J Mills in 2021, after seeing their videos on social media.

Currently making a living as residential children's support worker, Brown had initially blogged about his pregnancy on his blog "Up the Duff Man." The pregnancy was unexpected and had happened with his partner, Mills, when Brown had stopped taking hormones for health reasons. Brown has described how the pregnancy brought back feelings of body dysmorphia. He told Glamour "I took a pregnancy test and it was positive. It was like my whole world just stopped. That everything, all my manlihood that I've worked hard for, for so long, just completely felt like it was erased."

Brown gave birth to his daughter in 2024. The labour had to be induced two weeks before the due date, due to complications with the baby's growth. They were in an induced labour for three days, before having an emergency cesarean section. Brown, who has ADHD, said that if he were to become pregnant again he would want to have an elective caesarean. Speaking about his pregnancy, Brown stated: "Especially in the queer community, but also from cisgender straight people that were messaging me, going, 'I never even thought about this.' It’s not my job to educate people, but because I’m so passionate about existing and trans people, I feel like I need to get my story out there. And it’s a positive story."

Brown has modelled in cosmetics adverts for BPerfect Cosmetics. Brown also wrote the children's book In My Daddy's Belly for his daughter and an autobiography. According to PinkNews, the book has been the subject of criticism.

In 2025, Brown won the Influencer of the Year award at the Gaydio Pride Awards.

== See also ==
- Freddy McConnell
