= Bristol Pride =

Annual LGBTQ festival in Bristol, England

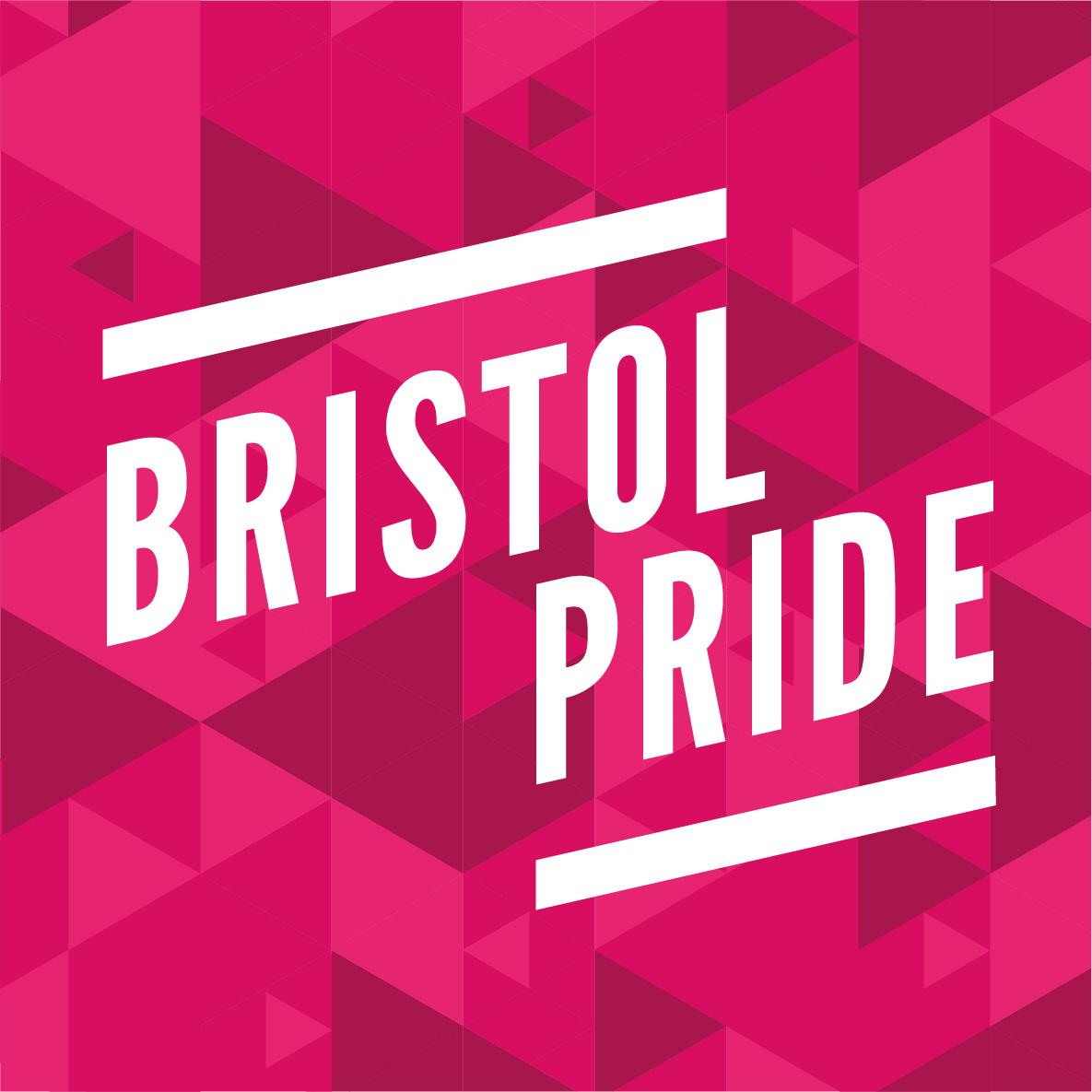

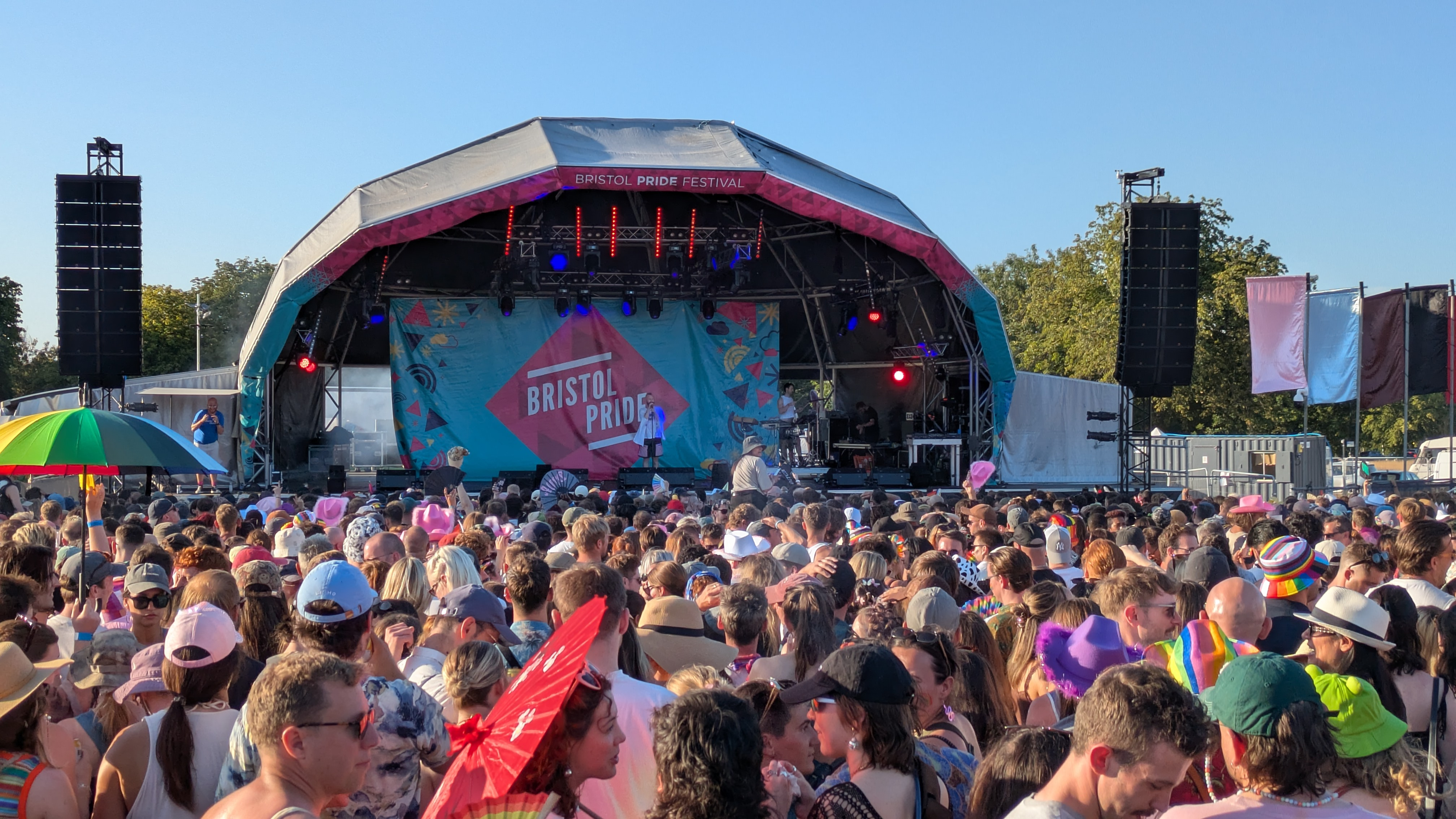
- The main stage at Bristol Pride 2025
- Frequency: Annual
- Locations: Bristol, England
- Years active: 1977–94, 2010–present
- Website: bristolpride.co.uk

Bristol Pride is an annual LGBTQ pride festival in the city of Bristol that serves South West England, organised by a charity of the same name. The festival is a fortnight of events in the city and concludes with Pride Day on the second Saturday of July. Pride Day includes a walking parade with no vehicles or floats allowed which presently begins in the city's Castle Park and ends at the Lloyds Amphitheatre on the harbourside. Further celebrations have recently been held at a festival site on the Downs. Bristol Pride remains a free-to-attend festival, but encourages entry to the events by donation to enable the festival to continue.

The event initially began in 1977 as Bristol Gay Festival in response to the Whitehouse v Lemon blasphemy court case, and continued yearly, in 1986 becoming Avon Pride under which the first pride march in Bristol took place in 1988. It became Pride West from 1994, though unsuccessful funding applications led to intermittent cancellations of the festival between 1997 and 2000. The final Pride West took place in 2001. After a nine year gap, the festival was revived as Bristol Pride for a 2010 event under a charity of the same name. It has continued yearly, though festivities were cancelled in 2020 and 2021 due to the COVID-19 pandemic.

The Bristol Pride organisation works throughout the year to lobby local decision makers to consider LGBTQ interests, as well as to run events for LGBTQ History Month, the International Day Against Homophobia, Biphobia and Transphobia, and AIDS Awareness Week.

== History ==
=== 1977–2001: Bristol Gay Festival, Avon Pride, and Pride West ===
The first Pride event in Bristol was held in 1977 under the name of Bristol Gay Festival. It was a fundraiser for Gay News, which was in a legal battle with morality campaigner Mary Whitehouse who had accused the paper of blasphemy following its publication of the James Kirkup poem The Love that Dares to Speak its Name. This festival was one of the earliest queer regional events in the UK outside London. The event did not include a march, instead consisting of social events and film showings at the Arnolfini. Plans for the festival to return again in 1978 were opposed by councillors from the Conservative Party as well as local clergy members, though Labour Party and Liberal Party councillors refused to halt the events. It ran under the name of Bristol Gay Festival through to 1985.

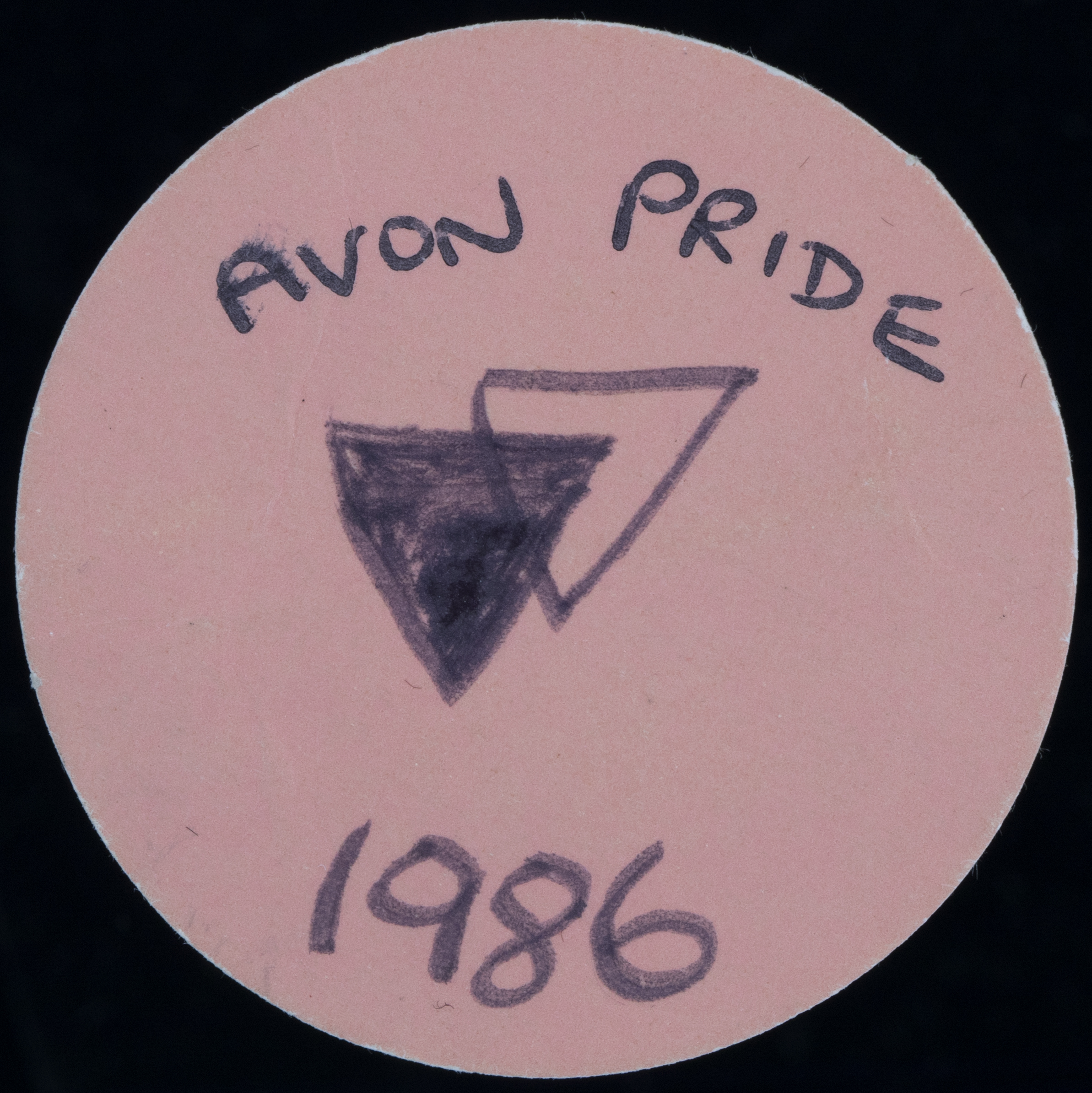
A badge for Avon Pride 1986

In 1986, the festival became known as Avon Pride as it at the time represented the county of Avon. The first pride march in Bristol, under Avon Pride, was in 1988. In 1991, a special postmark was issued to mark the 15th Pride festival in the city.

In 1994, reflecting the abolition of the county of Avon, the festival was renamed to Pride West. Pride West went ahead from 1994 to 1996, with the 1995 festival being opened by Joan Barbara McLaren, the Lord Mayor of Bristol. There were no Pride events in the city in 1996 and 1997 as funding applications to Avon County Council and Bristol City Council for these events were unsuccessful, though there was clar support from the local authority. Further Pride West events took place in 1999 and then 2001, after which there were no official Pride festivities in Bristol for nine years.

=== 2010–19: Bristol Pride's first decade ===
The registered charity Bristol Pride was set up to revive the event, with Daryn Carter acting as chief operating officer. The Bristol Pride festival was resurrected in 2010. 20,000 people took part in this festival which began with a parade to Castle Park which housed two stages for musical entertainment.

Bristol Pride 2011's parade began at midday in Queen Square, passing Council House before crossing The Centre and going down Baldwin Street to Castle Park.

In 2012, the event was moved to College Green as a one-off, due to the presence of an English Defence League march in the city centre. The EDL claimed it only opposed Islamic extremism, and that attendees of the march would not cause issues for Bristol Pride attendees. Over 700 police officers were organised to police the events, costing £500,000. Up to 300 EDL attendees marched, opposed by up to 500 anti-EDL protesters with the We Are Bristol campaign. 11 EDL members were arrested when violence broke out after the rally itself in Queen Square. Bristol Pride was able to go ahead with no issues. Bristol Pride's march from Berkeley Square was led by Afro-Brazilian Sambistas dancers as well as councillor Peter Main, Bristol's first openly gay Lord Mayor. The festival had 40 acts over five performance areas and two stages.

In April 2016, Bristol Pride was registered with the Charity Commission for England and Wales as a Charitable incorporated organisation. The first Trans Pride festival in Bristol, Trans Pride South West, was held that year. Bristol Pride itself relocated from Castle Park to the Bristol Harbourside with events taking place at Millennium Square and the Amphitheatre.

Up to 30,000 people took part in Bristol Pride in 2017, according to Carter, which that year had a "Global Voice" theme. Carter stated that 36,000 people came to the ampitheatre at Bristol Pride 2018, with about 12,000 people taking part in the parade.

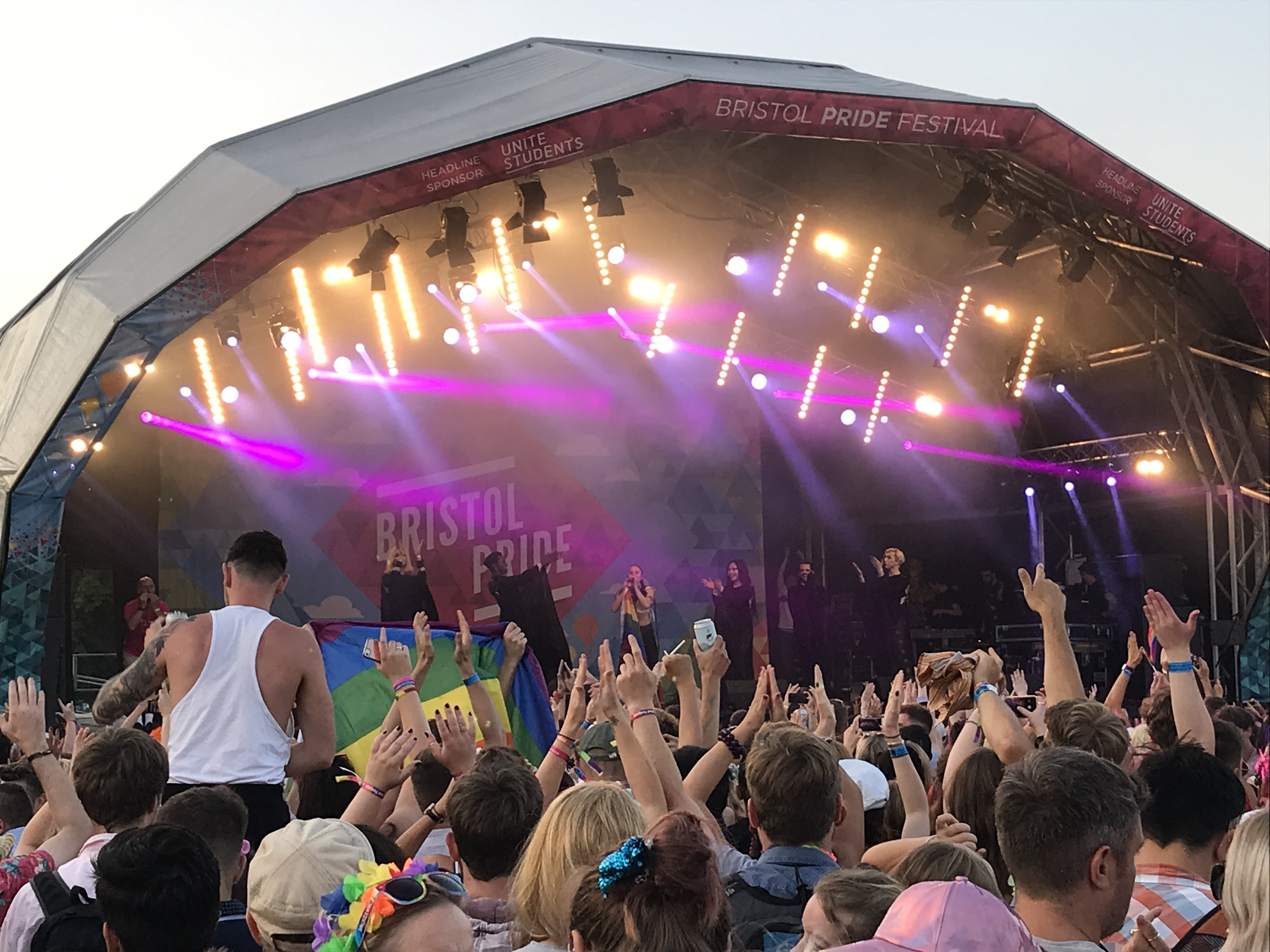
Main stage on the Downs at Bristol Pride 2019

To celebrate the tenth year of Bristol Pride in its current form and to accommodate growing numbers of attendees, Bristol Pride moved the 2019 event from the Harbourside to the Downs, a large area of open public land in the north-west of the city. This doubled the festival's capacity. Around 18,000 people took part in the parade from Castle Park to the Lloyds Amphitheatre, which included a 50-metre (55 yd) rainbow banner. Shops and businesses were decorated with rainbow signs and flags showing support, though small groups of anti-LGBTQ protestors were present along the route. The concert featured five stages with 100 live acts, and the festival grounds included a circus tent, wellbeing and mindfulness area, and silent disco. At the end of the event's music festival that year, Carter announced that he would step down from his organiser role, though he would in fact stay to "steer the charity through the challenges of Covid-19".

=== 2020–present: COVID-19 and growing attendance ===
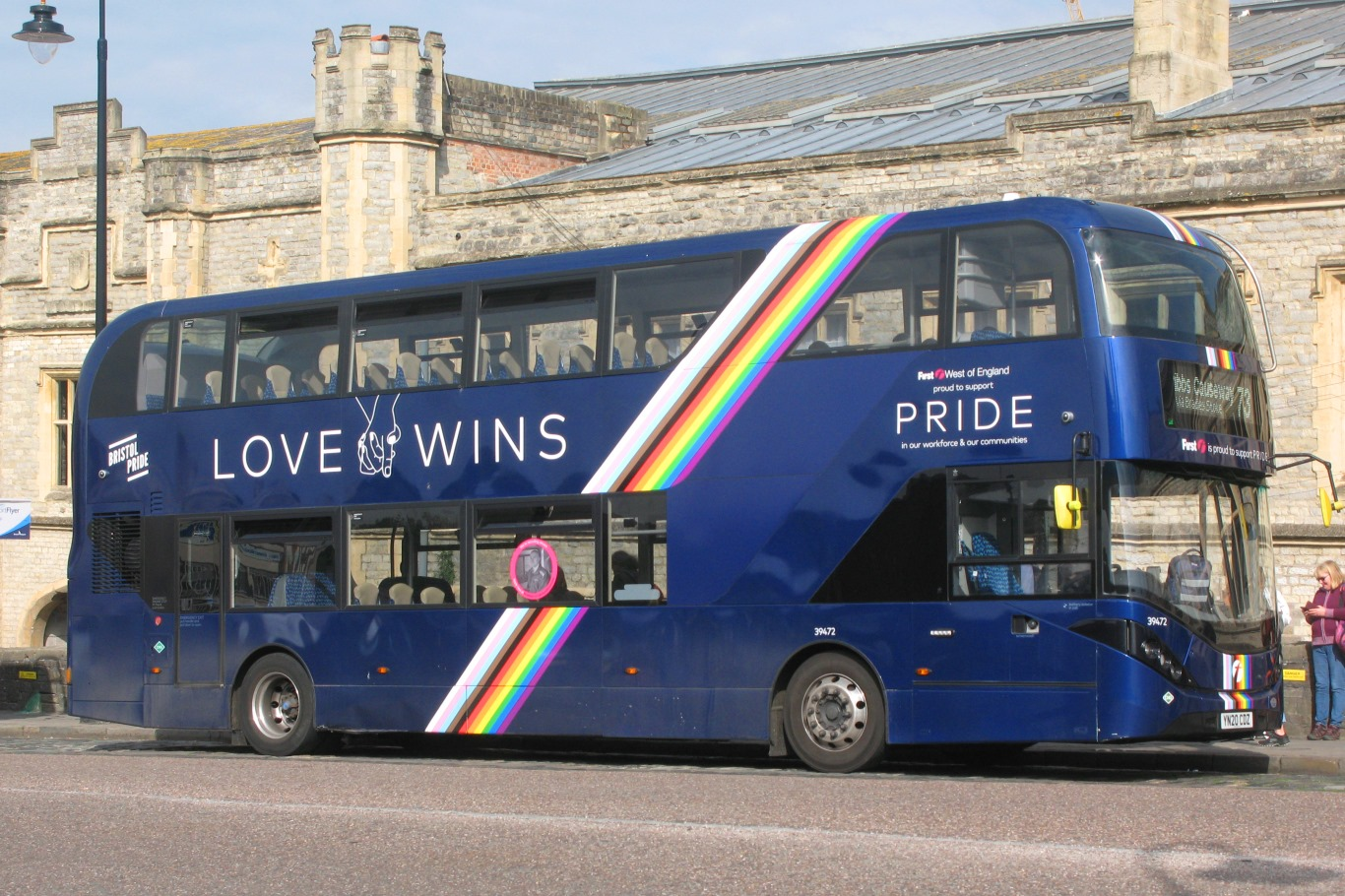
First West of England applied a 'Pride Bus' livery to one of its buses in 2021.

Due to the COVID-19 pandemic, the 2020 event was suspended and it was later announced that it would be online-only. Carter was made an MBE in the Queen's Birthday Honours list that October. The 2021 march was planned and a permanent rainbow crossing was painted on Wine Street, near Castle Park, on 30 June. The crossing was temporarily vandalised on 2 July, leading to a hate crime investigation. Bristol Pride 2021 was also postponed and then cancelled due to COVID-19 lockdowns. The bus operator First West of England went ahead with applying a Pride themed livery to one of its buses, having originally intended to showcase it as part of the cancelled festival.

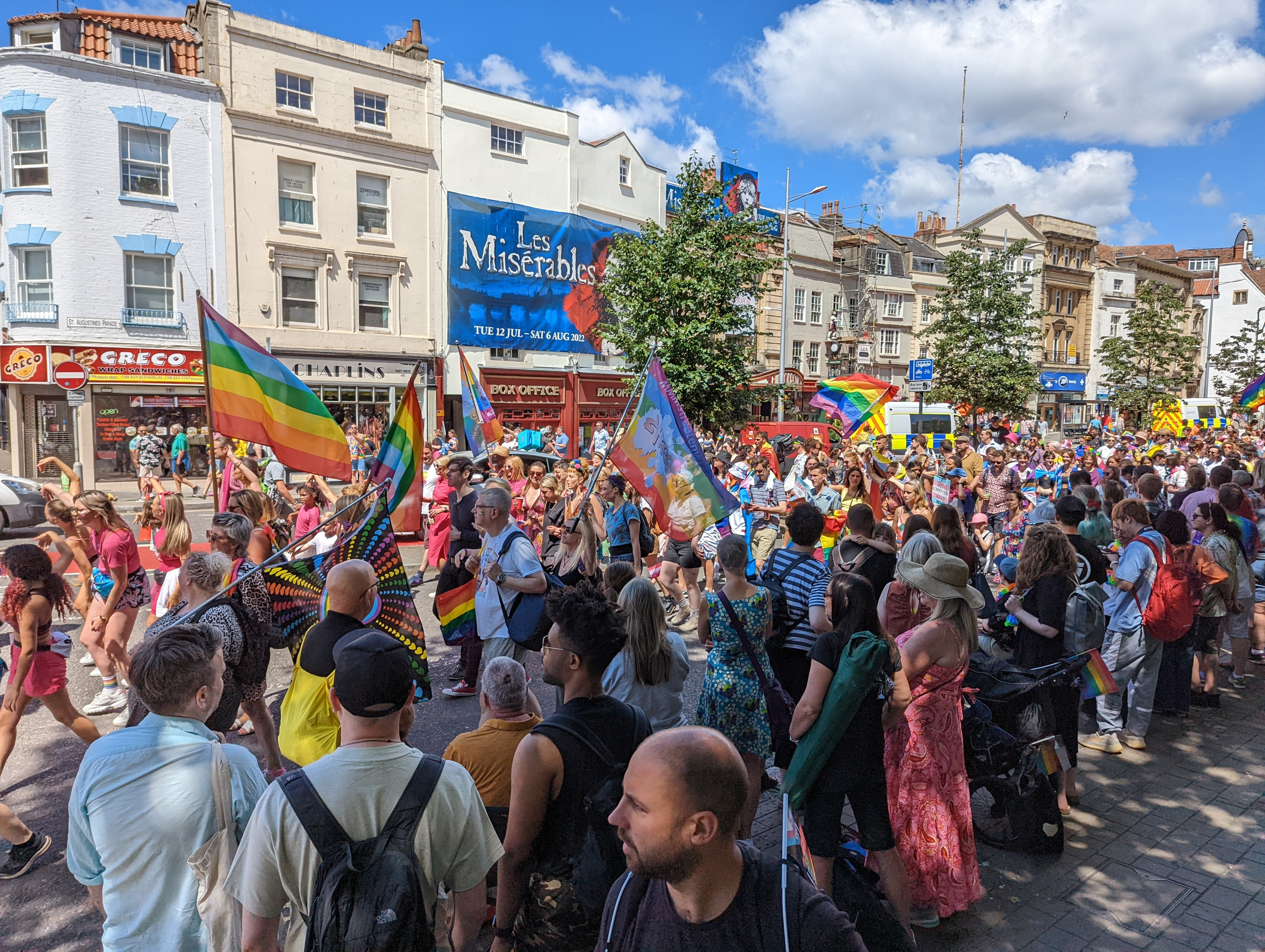
The 2022 Bristol Pride parade on St Augustine's Parade

Under director Eve Russell, Bristol Pride returned in 2022 with Pride Day festivities again being held on the Downs. While festivities began on 9 July and included a dog show, comedy night, circus night, theatre night and Queer Vision Film Festival, the march began at around 10:45 am on 25 June, and the Pride Day festival was expected to go until 9:30 pm with 100 acts across five stages. Through a video message just prior to headliner Carly Rae Jepsen's performance on 11 July, the Mayor of Bristol Marvin Rees announced that Bristol had bid to become the host of the Eurovision Song Contest 2023. In total, over 40,000 people attended the festival.

Prior to Bristol Pride 2023, the charity banned all political parties from taking part in its march under a party political banner. A billboard for Bristol Pride was set on fire less than 24 hours after first being put up, which the police treated as a hate crime. For the parade itself, 25,000 people marched, breaking previous records. A teenage boy was arrested at a Bristol Trans Pride picnic at Castle Park that July after gel pellets were fired at attendees which was similarly treated as a hate crime. The 14-year-old was later released on conditional bail, at which time police were looking for a second involved male. The attacks in 2023 matched an increase in attacks on Pride events in the UK as a whole.

For the 2024 festival, Bristol Pride's 15th anniversary, 25,000 people attended the march and 40,000 people were present on the Downs, making Bristol Pride "one of the largest prides in the UK", according to Carter. Researchers working for NPK Recovery, a startup company at the University of the West of England, collected the urine of festivalgoers for "testing and development" on a possible process of turning the urine into fertiliser. That year, Bristol Pride won 'Best Non-Music Festival' at the 2024 UK Festival Awards as well as 'Best Pride Organisation' at the 2024 Gaydio Awards.

At Bristol Museum & Art Gallery from June 2025, an exhibition by photographer Martin Parr displayed his photographs of Bristol Pride that he had taken over the previous five years. For the march at Bristol Pride 2025 in July, temperatures reached over 30 °C (86 °F). The same month, Carter was awarded an honorary doctorate in business administration to recognise his advocacy for LGBTQ people as director of Bristol Pride.

For the 2026 event, Bristol Pride is expected to include a Pride Circus Night at Circomedia.

== Musical acts and performances ==
Kelis headlined the 2011 Bristol Pride, whereas 2012's Bristol Pride was headlined by Martha Wash and Bright Light Bright Light. In 2018, singer Alexandra Burke, dance group Snap! and indie band Republica headlined the festival. The 2019 Pride Day included performers Melanie C, Boney M., RuPaul's Drag Race alumni Peppermint, and the return of Sophie Ellis-Bextor. After a cancellation by Alexandra Burke due to the birth of her baby, the 2022 Pride Day had Carly Rae Jepsen as its headliner, backed up by Bright Light Bright Light, Toya Delazy and Canada's Drag Race winner Priyanka. Natalie Imbruglia performed on the Legends stage at Bristol Pride 2023, her first performance at a Pride event. with Nadine Coyle, Alison Limerick, Sophie and the Giants, and Ladyhawke also billed for that year. Jake Shears performed his set to close the festival. The Human League headlined the 2024 event with Claire Richards and the punk band The Menstrual Cramps also performing, while on the Cabaret stage drag performers Heidi N Closet and Pixie Polite headlined. Canadian alt-pop singer Allie X headlined Bristol Pride 2025, with Kim Wilde playing in the festival's Afternoon Legend slot. For the 2026 event, the afterparty will be headlined by producer and DJ Jodie Harsh at the O2 Academy, with Sister Sledge and Jason Donovan also confirmed as performers. The Cabaret stage will feature drag performers Myki Meeks and Catrin Feelings.

== Gallery ==
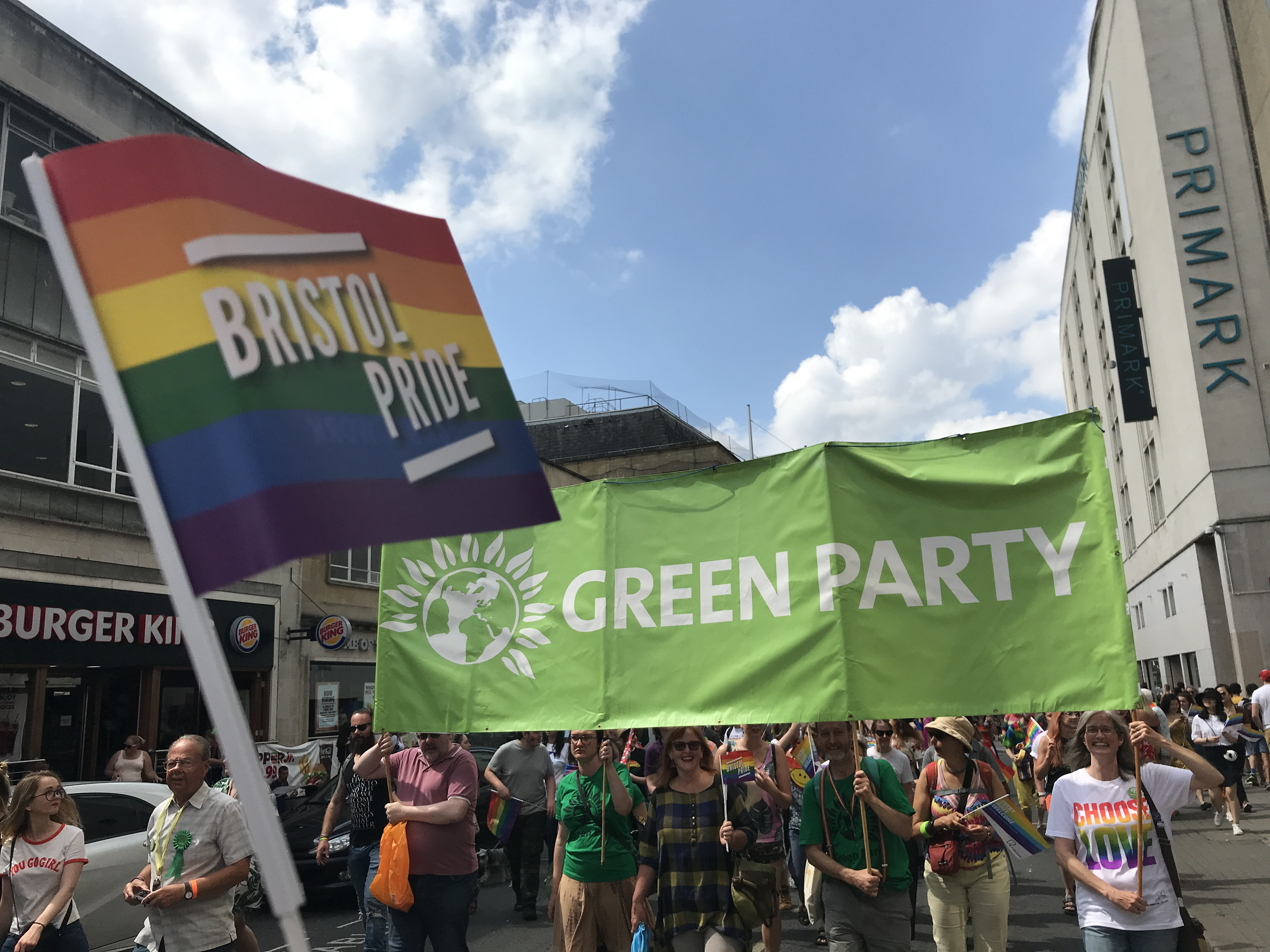
Bristol Green Party in 2018

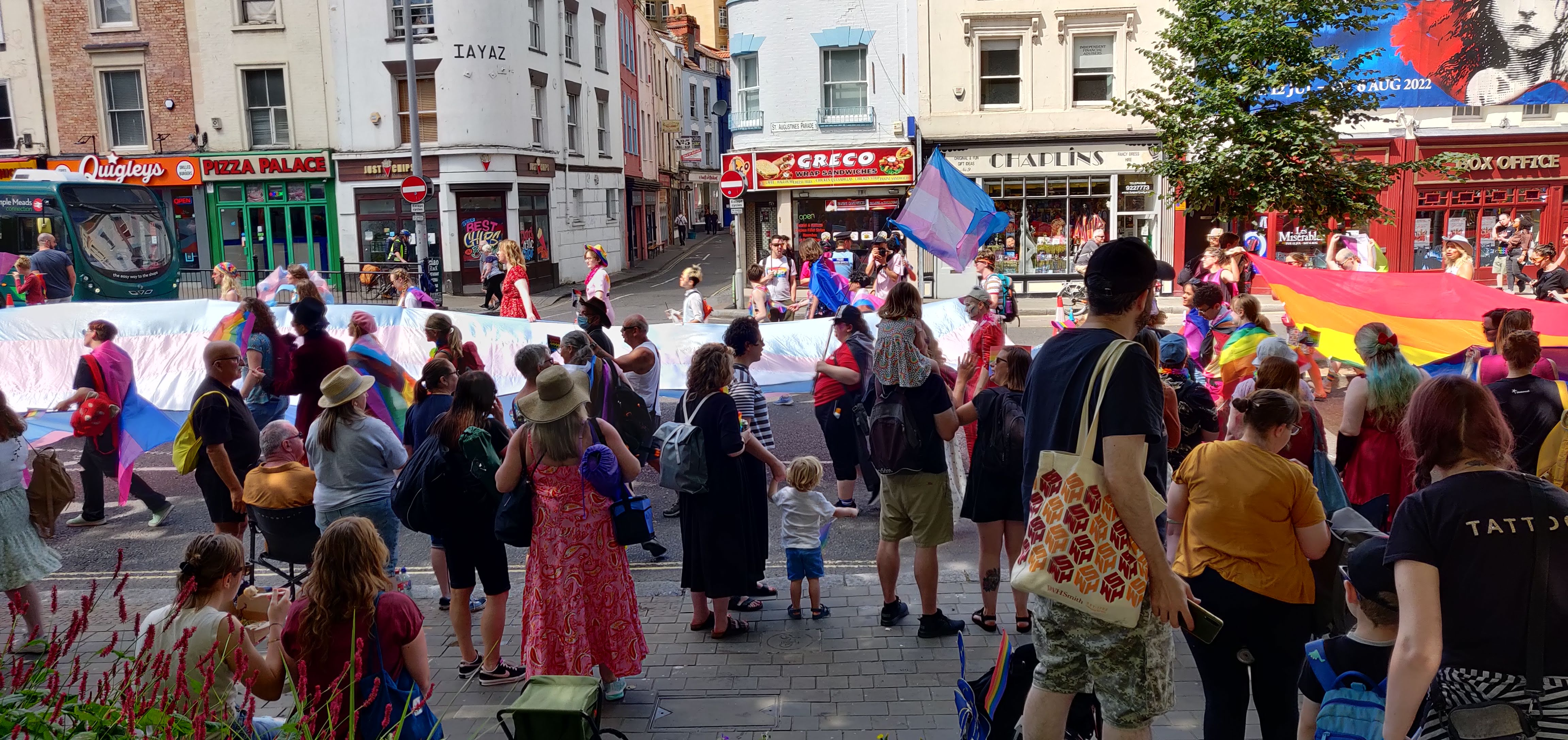
The start of the parade in 2022

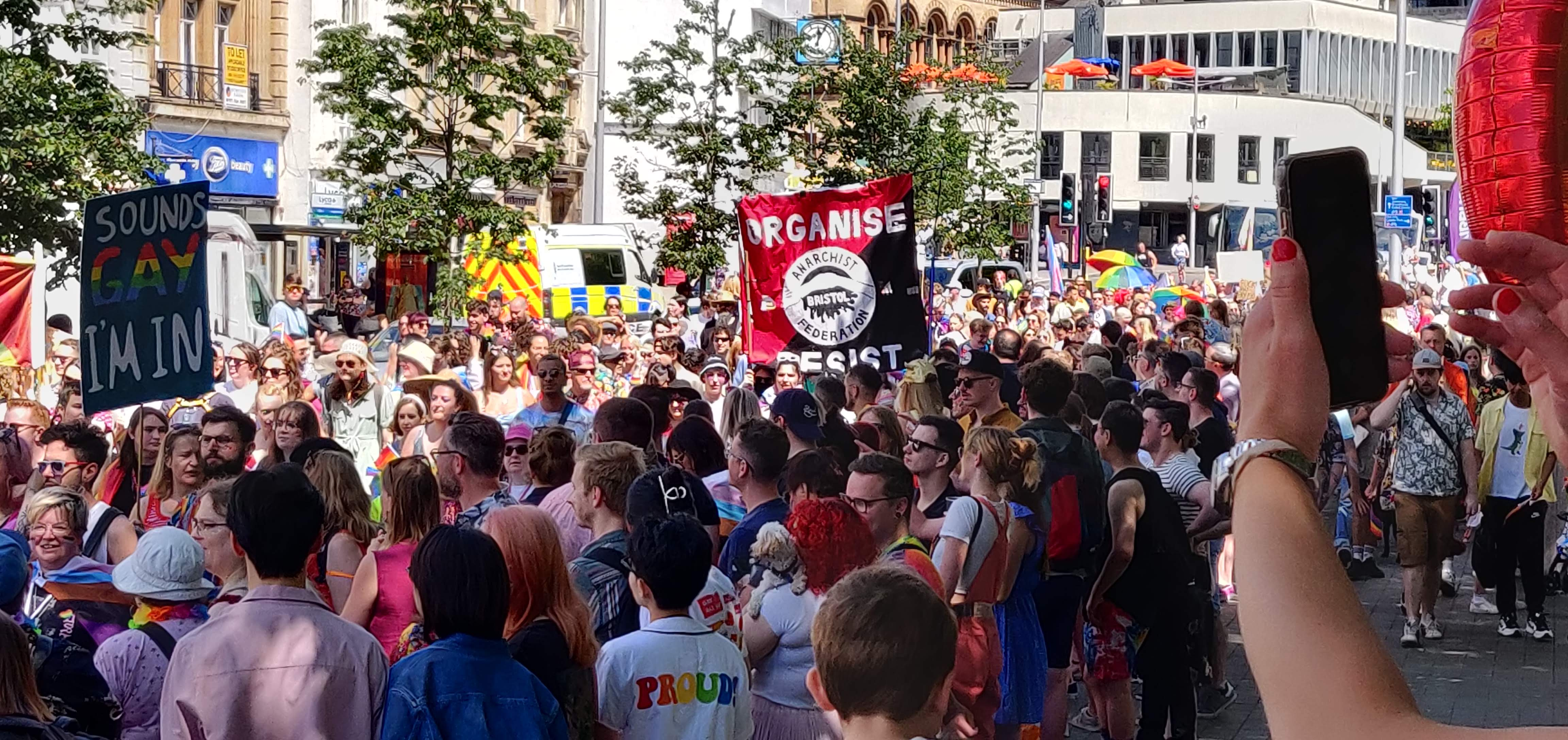
Bristol Anarchist Federation in 2022

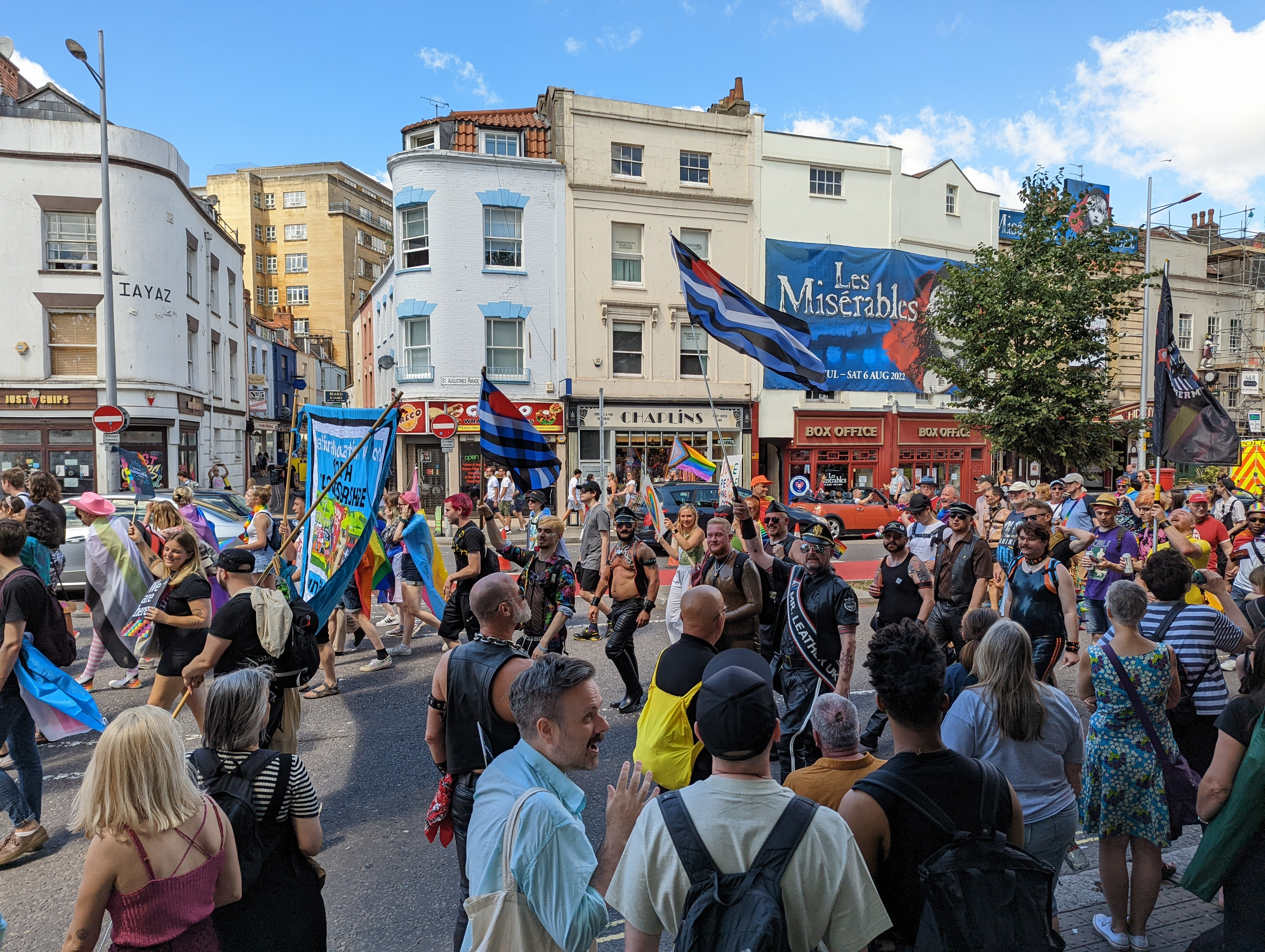
Mr Leather UK and the Leather pride flag in 2022

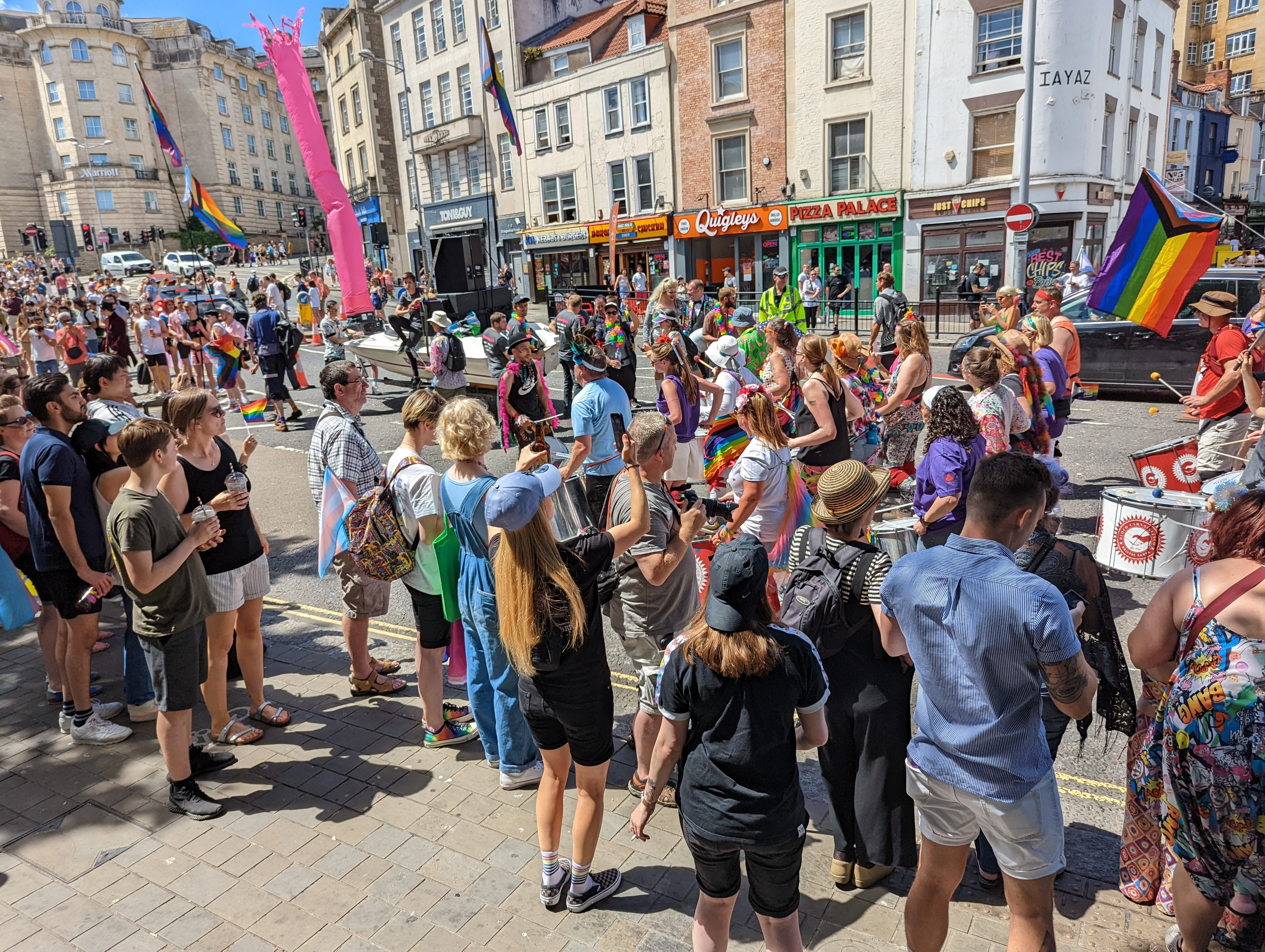
Drummers in 2022

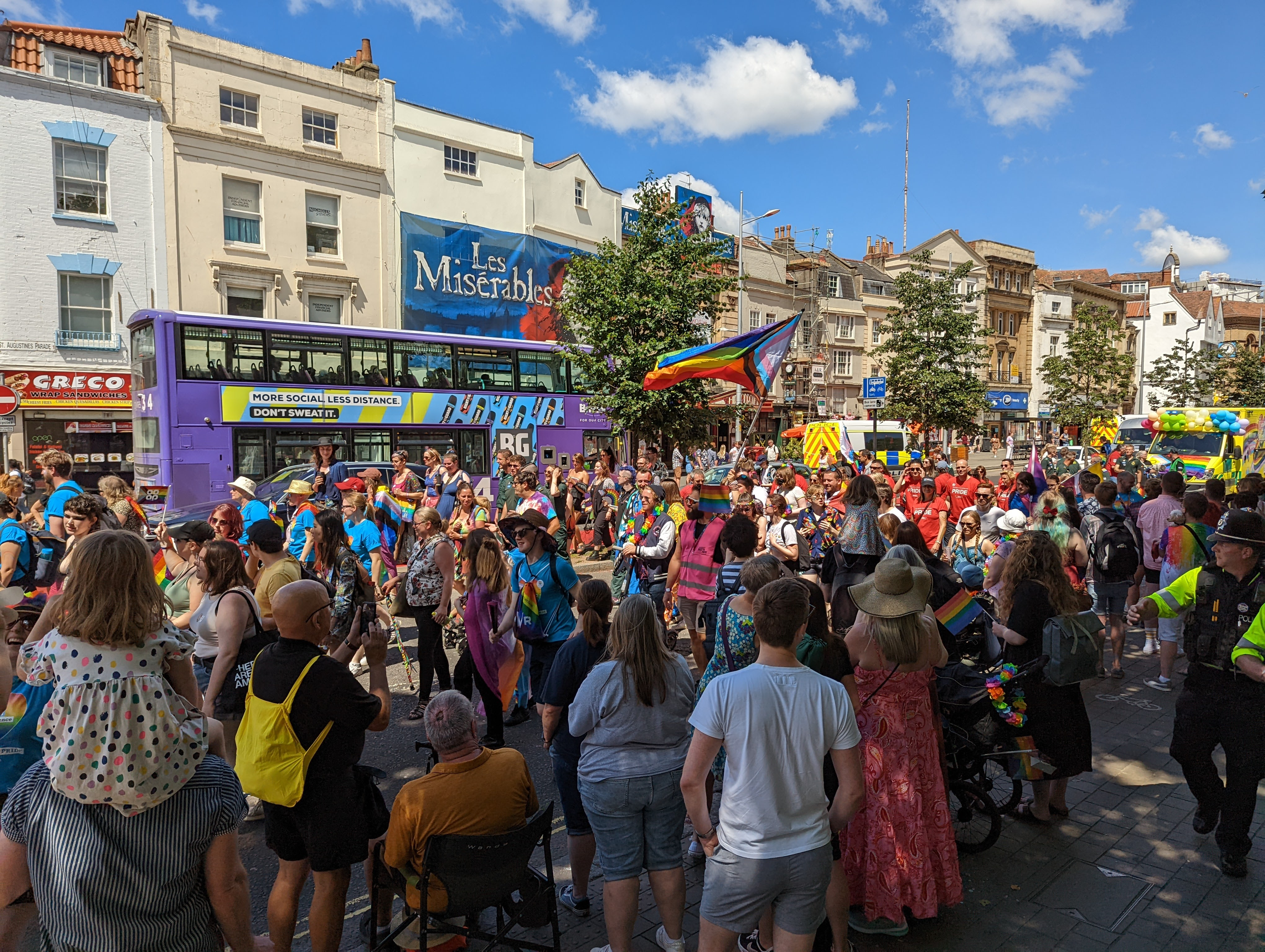
The end of the parade in 2022
