= Lea Valley Academy =

Location
- Bullsmoor Lane; Enfield, London, EN3 6TW; England
- Coordinates: 51°40′51″N 0°02′28″W

Information
- Type: Academy
- Motto: Aspiration, Innovation, Respect
- Local authority: Enfield
- Trust: EdAct Trust
- Department for Education URN: 144084 Tables
- Ofsted: Reports
- Headteacher: Stephen Kinson
- Gender: Coeducational
- Age: 11 to 18
- Enrolment: 871
- Website: https://www.leavalley.org.uk/

Lea Valley Academy (formerly Lea Valley High School) is a coeducational secondary school and sixth form located in the Bullsmoor area of Enfield, England.

== History ==
The school was founded in 1977 as Bullsmoor School, a purpose-built comprehensive school. It was later renamed Lea Valley High.

Lea Valley High School became the first specialist sports college in Enfield in September 2002. The school was re-built in 2003 and work was finished in 2006. In January 2009 it was recognised as one of the top 30 improved schools in the country, at 24th place, with 67.4% of students achieving GCSEs grades A*-C and 5 good GCSE grades or equivalent including Maths and English.

Previously a community school administered by Enfield London Borough Council, in May 2018 Lea Valley High School converted to academy status and was renamed Lea Valley Academy. The school is now sponsored by the EdAct Trust.

== Notable former pupils ==
- Paul Rodgers - footballer
- Josh Scowen - footballer
- Lady Phyll - Political Activist
