= Center for Black Equity =

African-American LGBT organization

The Center for Black Equity (known until 2012 as International Federation of Black Prides) is a coalition of Black gay pride organizers formed to promote a multinational network of LGBT/SGL (Lesbian, Gay, Bisexual, Transgender/Same Gender Loving) Prides and community-based organizations.

== Founding ==
The Center for Black Equity (CBE) is an organization birthed from a history of pride in the LGBT community. Before its time there were celebrations of LGBT pride in DC hosted by the Club House, an LGBT club that was occupied main by the Black LGBT community. The Club House started hosting what was called "Children's Hour", a themed party celebrated on Memorial Day. The "Children's Hour" brought members of the LGBT community together in celebration and awareness for each other. The Club House hosted this event for fifteen years until 1990, when the Club House had to cease business due to financial problems and key members of the staff being affected by AIDS.

This network of encompassed Black Prides from all over the world; Albany, NY; Buffalo, NY; Rochester, NY; Boston; New York City; Newark, NJ; Philadelphia; Pittsburgh; Baltimore; Washington, DC; Raleigh-Durham, NC; Charlotte; Columbia, SC; Atlanta; Jacksonville; Central Florida (Tampa); Jackson, MS; Memphis; Nashville; New Orleans; St. Louis; Indianapolis; Chicago; Detroit; Twin Cities (Minneapolis); Little Rock; Dallas; Austin; Portland; Los Angeles; San Diego; Toronto, Canada; London, UK and Johannesburg, South Africa. The following Black Prides are in the IFBP membership pipeline: Columbus, OH; Oakland, CA; Gainesville, FL; Orlando; Virginia Beach and Greensboro, NC. Also, Latino Prides in New York; Boston; Portland, OR; Chicago and Washington, DC.

The IFBP organization decided that its brand was not aligning with their mission and services that had and is still growing today. On July 28, 2012, the board of IFBP decided to change the brand from International Federation of Black Pride to Center for Black Equity (CBE).

== As IFBP ==
The International Federation of Black Prides was organized during D.C. Black Pride of May 1999 by a coalition of Black Pride organizers representing Chicago, North Carolina, New York City, Atlanta, Detroit, Minneapolis, and Washington, DC. The coalition saw a need to organize the twenty plus Black Prides in the United States and abroad for the purpose of developing sponsorship strategies, providing technical assistance, networking, mentoring, and supporting one another. IFBP acquired its IRS 501(c)(3) non-profit status in November 2004.

== Importance ==
The Center for Black Equity serves as a beneficial tool for Black LGBT persons who deal with the duality of being black and LGBT. CBE is the only organization in the world strictly focused on the Black LGBT experience. The disproportionate effect of HIV/AIDS on the black LGBT community compared to their white counterparts serves as a driving force within CBE. The Black LGBT community also face work discrimination, issues in housing opportunity, and lack of medical access more than White LGBT persons.

The CBE intentionally networks with CBOs (Community Based Organizations) to reach to the Black LGBT community to do health screenings, and they assist in connecting them to care and making sure they stay in care. This support system is an integral part in the Black LGBT community that is disproportionately affected by HIV/AIDS. Black gay and bisexual men account for the highest number of HIV/AIDS cases in the United States.
