= D.C. Black Pride =

Annual black queer pride festival in Washington, DC, USA

- Genre: Black gay pride
- Frequency: Annually on Memorial Day
- Location: Washington D.C.
- Founders: Welmore Cook, Theodore Kirkland, Ernest Hopkins
- Attendance: 60,000 (est.)

D.C. (District of Columbia) Black Pride is the first official black gay pride event in the United States and one of two officially recognized festivals for the African-American LGBT community. It is a program of the Center for Black Equity (CBE) and is also affiliated with the Capital Pride Alliance. DC Black Pride is held annually on Memorial Day weekend.

== History ==
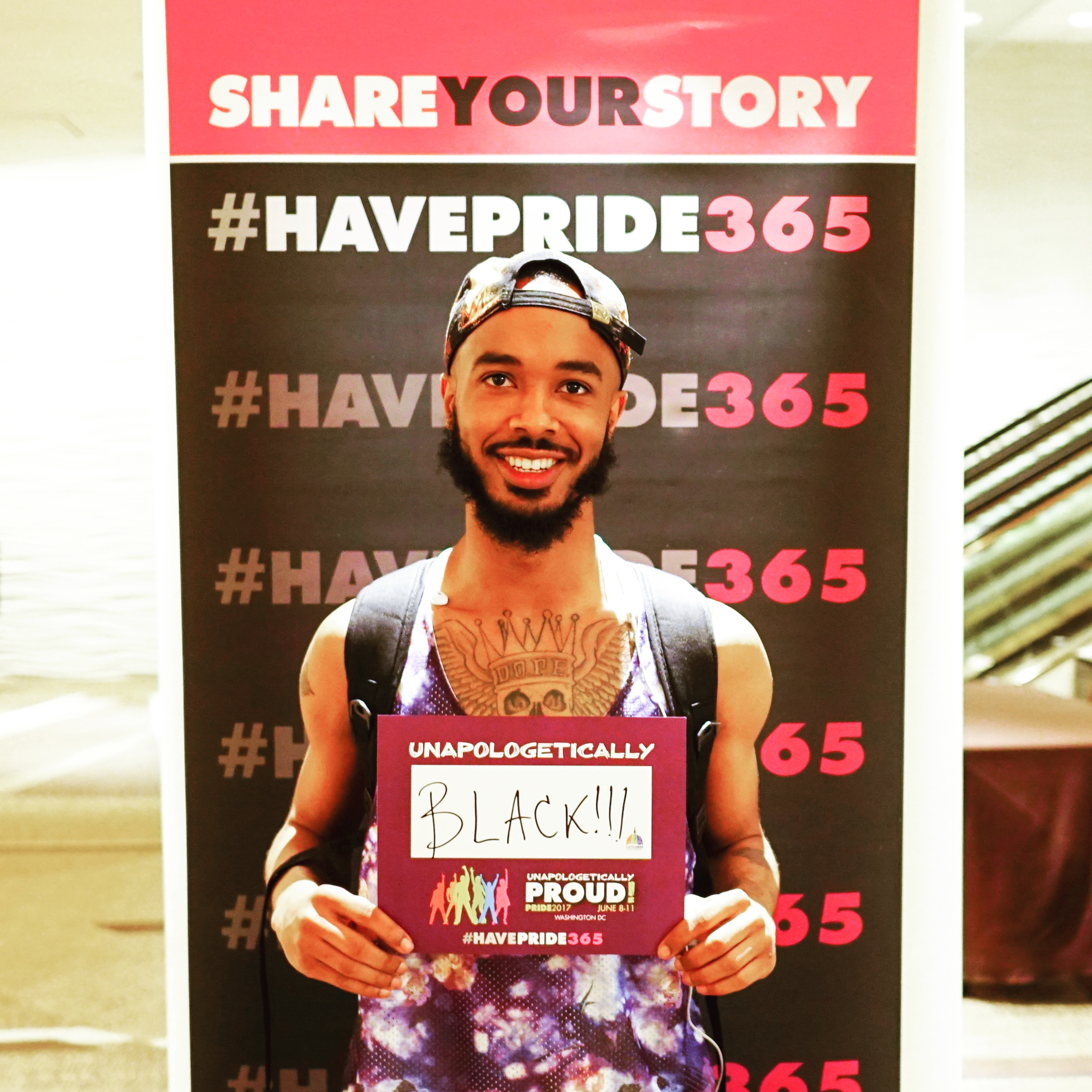
Attendee at the 2017 D.C. Black Pride event

Washington, D.C. had long been a popular destination for black LGBT people as a result of its large black LGBT community and progressive reputation. Since 1978, DC has been home to the nation's first black LGBT political advocacy group, the DC chapter of the National Coalition of Black Lesbians and Gays.

The first DC Black Pride was created by Welmore Cook, Theodore Kirkland, and Ernest Hopkins in collaboration with the DC Coalition of Black Lesbians and Gays and the Inner City AIDS Network. Planning was done over about three months. It was held in May 1991 as "Let's All Come Together, Black Lesbian and Gay Pride Day". The event focused on raising funds for HIV/AIDS organizations serving the local LGBT African-American community. About 800 people attended.

In 1992 the event, now run by the nonprofit "Center for Black Equity" (CBE), spanned over multiple days. Events included the first Washington screening of Marlon Riggs' film Tongues United.

The success of the event inspired the creation of elaborate annual official black pride events in other major cities across the country. Annually, over 100,000 is expected which establishes it as the largest black pride event in the world.

In 2018 a documentary about the event's history, DC Black Pride: Answering the Call, was premiered over Memorial Day weekend.

The event was not held in 2020 and was held virtually in 2021 due to the COVID-19 pandemic, but it returned in-person in 2022.

== See also ==
- Capital Pride (Washington, D.C.)
- Gay Men's Chorus of Washington, D.C.
- Ball culture
- African American LGBT community
- Black gay pride
