= Bailey J Mills =

English drag performer (born 1999)

- Born: Bailey-Jaye Timothy Mills; 13 July 1999 (age 27); Spalding, Lincolnshire, England
- Other names: Miss Francesca; Bailey Jaye Mills
- Occupation: Drag queen
- Years active: 2020–present
- Television: The After Shave with Danny Beard
- Children: 1

Bailey-Jaye Timothy Mills (born 13 July 1999), known professionally as Bailey J Mills, is an English drag performer, known for her unconventional comedy skits and videos on social media. In 2023, she joined The After Shave with Danny Beard as the shop assistant.

== Life and career ==
Mills was born on 13 July 1999 in Spalding, Lincolnshire. Mills has autism and was expelled from two schools for disruptive behaviour. She has said she found solace by attending ballet classes and after-school musical theatre groups. Mills took an interest in drag whilst attending college after she "started playing around [with make-up] and then fell in love with it, adding that it was a "really fun way to express [herself]". She initially used the stage name Miss Francesca and said that whilst underage, she would be able to get into nightclubs when dressed in drag clothing. Mills also became subject to abuse and bullying on social media as a result of performing in drag.

In 2020, Mills began uploading comedy skits to social media. One particular video in which Mills impersonated Velma Dinkley from Scooby-Doo, wearing a visible breastplate, went viral on social media. Known for her "crunchy, cheap and affordable" aesthetic and "council estate" sense-of-humour, Mills was described by Dazed magazine as the "breakout star of the digital drag era". Following on from her online popularity, she began appearing at various LGBT pride, drag brunches and drag bingo events.

In May 2023, Mills' then-partner Logan Brown gave birth to their daughter. Brown, who is a transgender man, featured on the cover of Glamour magazine, in which the couple discussed the transphobia they had faced during the pregnancy. In August 2023, Mills debuted her show Unfiltered + Scummy at the Edinburgh Fringe Festival and subsequently announced a tour for November 2023 at the Clapham Grand. In September 2023, Mills began appearing as the shop assistant on The After Shave with Danny Beard, the spin-off show of the BBC competition RuPaul's Drag Race UK. Mills has previously applied for Drag Race and expressed interest in appearing on the show, however said she felt she would be "misunderstood".

In September 2023, Mills came out as a trans woman. She has said that the birth of her daughter encouraged her to come out, telling PinkNews that "she’s going to have a great life no matter what, but I want her to have the best life. To show her happiness, I want to be happy within myself and be authentically myself". She uses she/her and they/them pronouns.

In May 2026, Mills was joined by British singer, PinkPantheress, for an inpromptu performance at Via on Manchester's Canal Street.

== Filmography ==
As self
Year	Title	Notes	Ref
2023	The After Shave with Danny Beard	Shop assistant	

== Tours ==
- Elevate East x Bailey J Mills presents Unfiltered + Scummy (2023)
