= Phyll Opoku-Gyimah =

English human rights campaigner (born 1974)

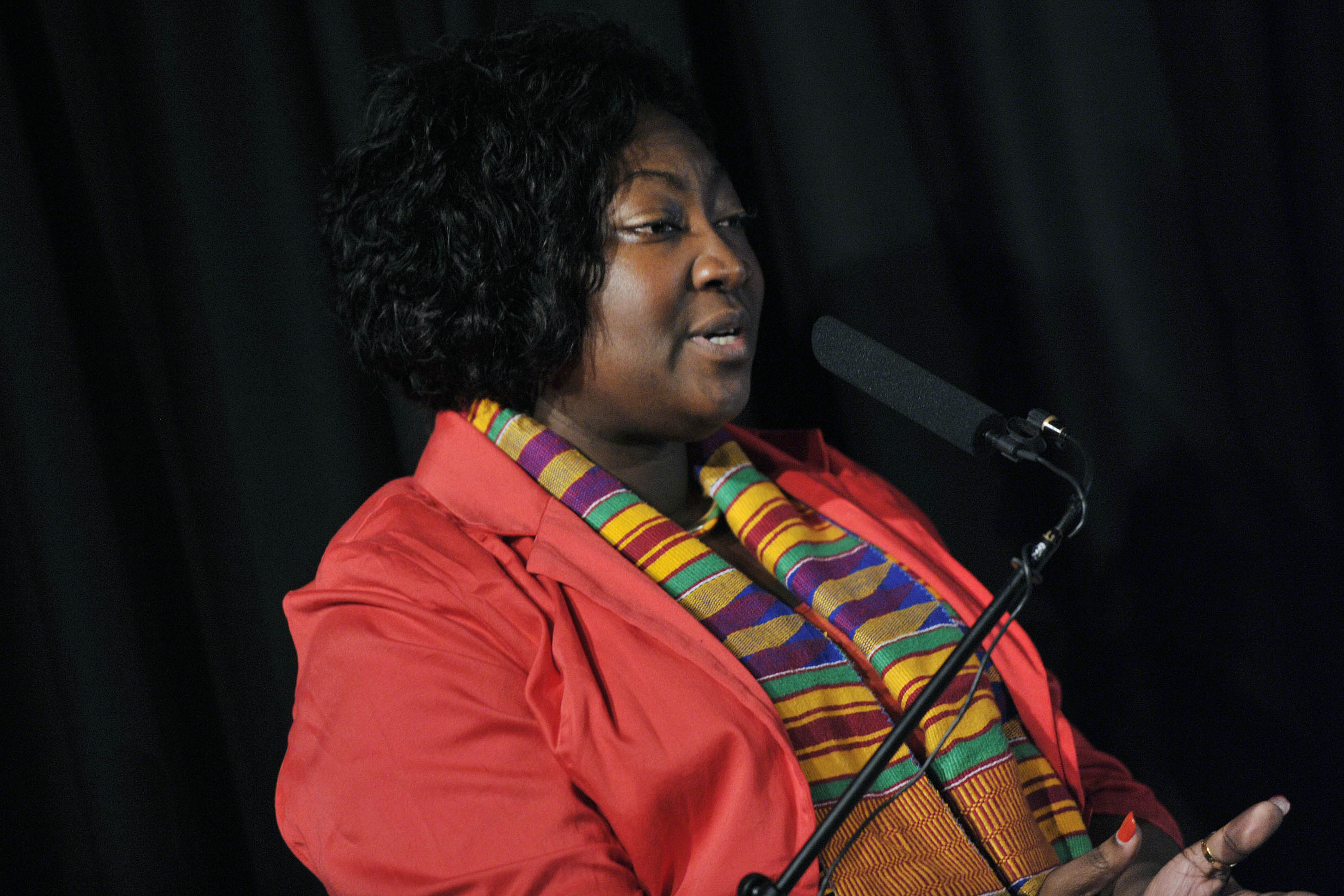
- Phyll Opoku-Gyimah at the Southbank Centre in March 2014
- Born: Phyllis Akua Opoku-Gyimah; November 1974 (age 51); Islington, London, England
- Education: Lea Valley Academy
- Occupation: Political activist
- Organisations: Executive Director of Kaleidoscope Trust; UK Black Pride
- Political party: Labour
- Awards: Independent on Sunday Pink List, 2011 (64), 2012; Black LGBT Community Award; Big Society Award nomination (2012); World Pride Power List (2012); European Diversity Awards Campaigner of the Year in 2017

Phyllis Akua Opoku-Gyimah (born November 1974), also known as Lady Phyll, is a British political activist known for her work for racial, gender and LGBT+ equality. She is co-founder and chief executive of UK Black Pride, executive director of DIVA Magazine and former executive director of Kaleidoscope Trust.

== Early life and education ==
Opoku-Gyimah was born in Britain in 1974 and attended Bullsmoor School in Lea Valley, where she first became politically active. She is of Ghanaian ancestry.

== Career ==
Opoku-Gyimah joined the civil service working for the Department for Work and Pensions benefit fraud section. She ran the online voluntary organization BLUK (Black Lesbians in the UK), which brought women, transwomen, and bi-women together online. This led her to becoming a co-founder, trustee and executive director of UK Black Pride, which "promotes unity and co-operation among all Black people of African, Asian, Caribbean, Middle Eastern and Latin American descent, as well as their friends and families, who identify as lesbian, gay, bisexual or transgender". UK Black Pride began in 2005 as a day trip to Southend-on-Sea in England.

Opoku-Gyimah was appointed trustee of lesbian, gay, bisexual and transgender (LGBT) rights charity, Stonewall in January 2015 but resigned three years later when the charity announced it would partner with UK Black Pride. Opoku-Gyimah publicly refused an MBE in the 2016 New Year Honours.

With Rikki Beadle-Blair and John R Gordon, she is the editor of Sista!, an anthology of writings by LGBT women of African/Caribbean descent with a connection to the United Kingdom, released by Team Angelica Publishing in 2018, which includes work by 31 writers, including Yrsa Daley-Ward and Babirye Bukilwa.

Well known among the trade union movement, she served on the Trades Union Congress (TUC) race relations committee and was head of equality at the Public and Commercial Services Union until June 2019.

In May 2019, Opoku-Gyimah was appointed executive director human rights charity the Kaleidoscope Trust. She later resigned in November 2023, to become the first chief executive of the charity she founded UK Black Pride.

Opoku-Gymiah has been a member of Sky’s diversity and inclusion advisory council since July 2023. In June 2025, she was refused a rightful entry in the USA without a visa because she had previously visited Cuba, thus compromising her ESTA.

== Political activity ==
Opoku-Gyimah is well known for her activism on race, gender and LGBT+ rights in the United Kingdom. She is considered one of Britain's most prominent lesbian activists. She has raised the issue of racism in the LGBT community and spoken about the importance of intersectionality. She has been critical of Pride in London stating in an interview she felt the organisation "had a long way to go".

She entered the Labour Party internal contest to replace Heidi Alexander as Member of Parliament for Lewisham East when she stood down to work for the Mayor of London. She left midway through the race following an allegation of an antisemitic tweet and Janet Daby was selected as the candidate and elected to UK Parliament in the by-election on 14 June 2018.

Opoku-Gyimah made headlines when she attended the British Academy Film Awards in 2018 with British actress Andrea Riseborough. She attended the ceremony as show of solidarity with women who had experienced discrimination as part of a campaign against sexism.

Opoku-Gyimah was appointed a Grand Marshall of New York Pride in 2019, during the 50th Anniversary of the Stonewall riots.

Opoku-Gyimah was named on a list of 100 Great Black Britons in October 2020, as part of the initiative by Windrush campaigner Patrick Vernon OBE and historian Angelina Osborne to celebrate Black British people during Black History Month.

== Awards and recognition ==
- Independent on Sunday Pink List, 2011 (64), 2012 (11)
- Black LGBT Community Award
- Big Society Award nomination (2012)
- World Pride Power List (2012)
- European Diversity Awards Campaigner of the Year in 2017.
- Pride Power List (2021)
- Honorary doctorate by London South Bank University (LSBU).
- British LGBT Awards.
- Lifetime Achievement Award.

== Published work ==
- Opoku-Gyimah, Phyll; Beadle-Blair, Rikki; Gordon, John R., eds. (25 January 2018). Sista!: An anthology of writings by Same Gender Loving Women of African/Caribbean descent with a UK connection. Team Angelica. ISBN 978-0995516243.
