= Kyle De'Volle =

Kyle De’Volle is a British fashion designer, creative director, celebrity stylist, fashion consultant and style commentator. Born 29 November 1989

De'Volle grew up in Notting Hill Gate in West London and has worked for Rita Ora as her stylist from 2010-2018

De'Volle has designed a shoe range for JF London and also two accessories ranges for Charlotte Simone.

Known first and foremost for his work as a celebrity stylist, De'Volle has enjoyed a long creative collaboration with Rita Ora. In addition to Rita, De Volle has worked with Cara Delevingne, Bruno Mars, Leigh-Anne Pinnock, Andreja Pejic.

De'Volle's television and editorial credits include The X Factor UK, The Voice UK, MOBO Awards, Britain's Got Talent, MTV, Vogue, Cosmopolitan, Tatler, Feroce and Mixte magazine.
