= Michael Gunning =

Jamaican swimmer

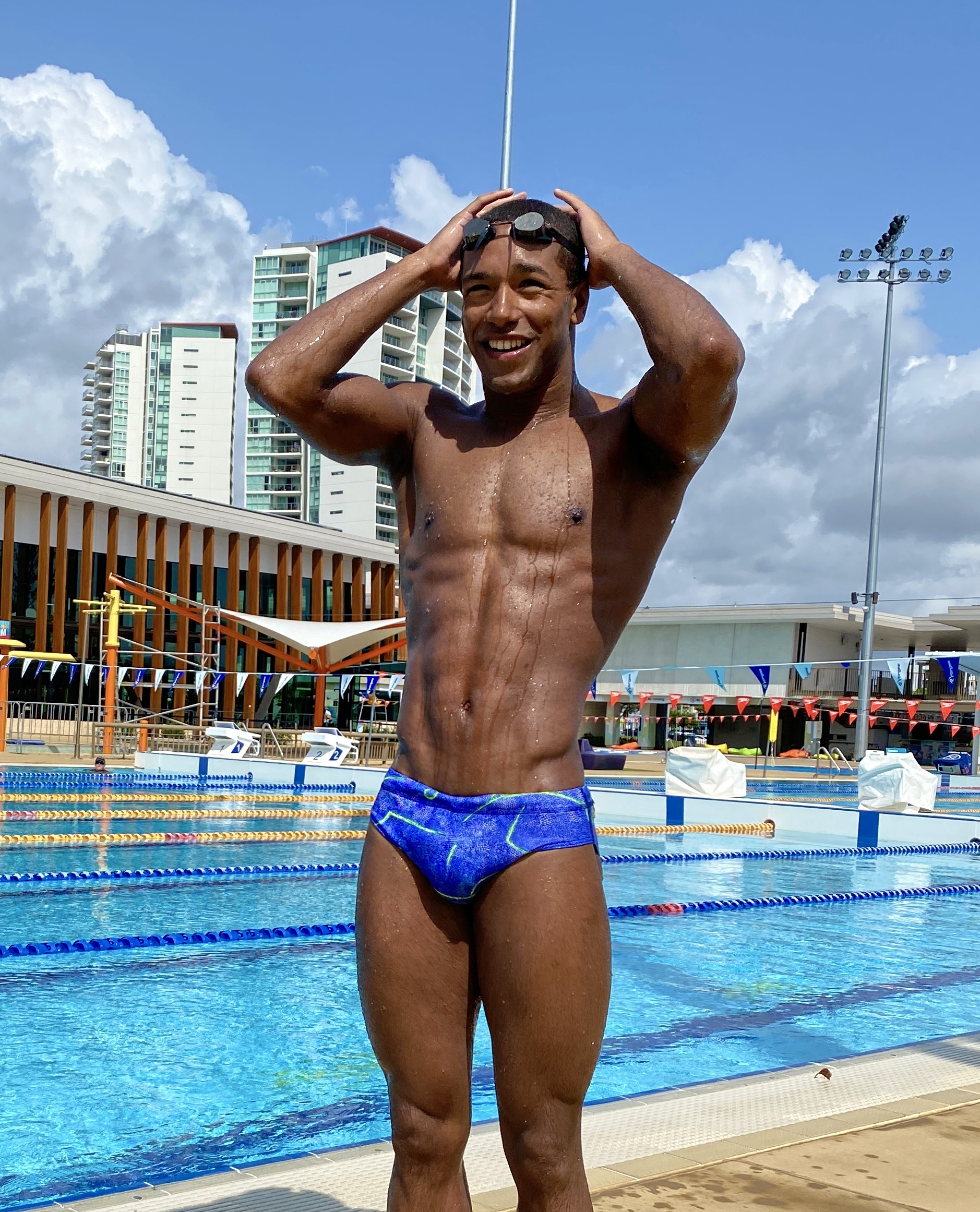
- Gunning in Australia in 2020

Personal information
- National team: Great Britain; Jamaica
- Born: 29 April 1994 (age 32) Farnborough, Kent
- Website: Official website

Sport
- Sport: Swimming
- Strokes: Butterfly, Freestyle
- Club: Stockport Metro Swimming Club

Michael Gunning (born 29 April 1994) is a British-Jamaican competitive swimmer, television presenter, documentary filmmaker and advocate for diversity and inclusion in sport. He is best known for setting national records while representing Jamaica at the 2017 and 2019 World Aquatics Championships. Since then, he's become a prominent voice for LGBTQ+ visibility and mental-health awareness in sport and media.

In 2018, Gunning was named Sportsman of the Year in Jamaica for his contribution to sport. Following his retirement from competitive swimming in 2022, Gunning expanded his work into television presenting and documentary production, including hosting live swimming coverage at the 2022 Commonwealth Games in Birmingham.

In 2024, Gunning was included in the Forbes 30 Under 30 Europe list in the Sport & Games category.. In October 2024, he debuted his first documentary as director, producer, and host on Sky Sports, titled Beneath the Surface, which explored LGBTQ+ representation in sport and featured footballer Jake Daniels.

Beyond his decorated swimming career, Gunning has become a recognised presenter and media personality, appearing on programmes including BBC Morning Live and Lorraine on ITV, and has hosted and contributed to major Pride events in London and Manchester, where he champions LGBTQ+ inclusion and mental health awareness.

== Early life and education ==
Gunning was born on 29 April 1994 at Farnborough Hospital in Kent, England. He attended Crofton Infant and Crofton Junior School, where he was presented with the Year 6 Outstanding Student Award by the Petts Wood and District Residents Association.

Gunning started swimming at the age of four and joined Beckenham Swimming Club at the age of seven. He had a big fear of the water as his parents were not strong swimmers, and went onto conquering the fear and qualified for the National Championships at the age of twelve. At thirteen, he won the top award for the best 13-year-old in the county and was identified as having Olympic Potential by the London Regional Development Programme.

Gunning studied at Coopers Technology College, where fellow alumni include comedian Tom Allen and actor Charlie Clement, before graduating from the University of East London in 2018 with first-class honours in Early Childhood Studies.

== Swimming Career ==
Gunning made his Team GB debut when he represented England at the LEN European Cup in 2010 and concluded his GB representation at the European University Games in 2016, winning double gold in the 200 metre butterfly and 400 metre freestyle events.

Gunning is a survivor of the 2017 Manchester Arena bombing. Shortly after the event he decided to represent Jamaica; he had been eligible to compete for Jamaica or Great Britain, but wanted to inspire more people in the Caribbean. He competed in the 200 metre butterfly and the men's 200 metre freestyle event in both the 2017 World Aquatics Championships and 2019 World Aquatics Championships and represented Jamaica in the 2019 Pan American Games.

Gunning initially secured a selection spot for the Tokyo 2020 Olympic Games; however, following the COVID-19 pandemic, the International Swimming Federation (FINA) revised the qualifying standards and allocated only one "universality place" to Jamaica. As a result, Gunning was not selected to compete at the Games.

Shortly after, he announced his retirement from competitive swimming as arguably the fastest male swimmer in Jamaican history during an exclusive interview with The Guardian.

== Television and Media Career ==
Gunning came out as gay whilst appearing on the reality dating show The Bi Life on E! Entertainment, making him Jamaica's first openly gay athlete on the National Team. During the show, he explained he wanted to inspire more people to be themselves in sport and be a LGBT role model for younger sports people to look up to. He later went on to win the Pride Award at the Attitude Pride Awards 2019 for his efforts to raise LGBTQ+ visibility around the globe in sports..

Following his retirement from competitive swimming in 2022, Gunning moved into television presenting, hosting live swimming coverage at the 2022 Commonwealth Games in Birmingham. He also served as a Pride House Birmingham Ambassador, promoting inclusion and ensuring all attendees felt safe and welcome at the Games, while also contributing to the Commonwealth Sport Pride Network.

Gunning appeared alongside Tom Daley in the BBC One documentary Tom Daley: Illegal to Be Me, which examined LGBTQ+ experiences and discrimination in Commonwealth countries.

In 2024, Gunning was included in the Forbes 30 Under 30 Europe list in the Sports & Games category, recognising his influential work both in and beyond the swimming pool. The accolade celebrated his impact as a vocal advocate for LGBTQ+ visibility in sport, as well as his contributions to media and youth engagement initiatives across both the United Kingdom and Jamaica.

Later that year, in October 2024, Gunning made his directorial debut with the documentary Beneath the Surface, which premiered on Sky Sports. Serving as director, producer, and host, Gunning explored the challenges and progress of LGBTQ+ inclusion in elite sport. The documentary featured a high-profile interview with openly gay footballer Jake Daniels, offering a rare and candid look into the personal experiences of LGBTQ+ athletes. Beneath the Surface was widely praised for its authenticity and impact, further solidifying Gunning's role as a leading voice for equality and representation in sport-related media.

Gunning has since become a recognised presenter and media personality in both the UK and the Caribbean. He has appeared on popular television programmes including BBC Morning Live, where he supported Dr. Ranj in his challenge to learn to swim for BBC Children in Need in a live broadcast, as well as Steph's Packed Lunch and Lorraine on ITV as a guest presenter.

== Personal life ==
After retiring from competitive swimming in 2022, Gunning travelled to Jamaica with Tom Daley for BBC One's 'Tom Daley: Illegal to be Me' documentary. When asked about his experiences, he opened up around the bullying and hate messages he's received since coming out as gay, and his goals to support the LGBT community in the future.

Gunning continually champions LGBTQ+ rights and mental health in sport, and has spoken openly about both in multiple media publications. He also became a Kaleidoscope Trust Patron, alongside Tom Daley OBE, Munroe Bergdorf, Dustin Lance Black and Kyle De'Volle. During the Summer of 2022, Gunning officially opened Pride House Birmingham at the 2022 Commonwealth Games and serves as an ambassador for Pride House International for the Paris 2024 and LA 2028 Olympic Games.

== Impact and legacy ==
Gunning has become a prominent advocate for inclusion, representation, and water safety education. He has worked with the NSPCC on its Childhood Day campaign, highlighting the importance of safeguarding young people and raising awareness around child protection initiatives.

He supported the Royal Life Saving Society UK in its successful campaign to include the Water Safety Code in the Relationships, Sex and Health Education (RSHE) statutory guidance for schools in England.

As an ambassador for the British Elite Athletes Association (formally British Olympic Association), Gunning works to promote athlete welfare, advocate for minority representation within professional sport, and provide mentoring to emerging talent. He has hosted and contributed to major Pride events in London and Manchester, where he champions LGBTQ+ inclusion and mental health awareness.

Through school visits, national campaigns, and public speaking, Gunning continues to use his platform to champion equality, inspire young people, and improve access to swimming and water safety education in the UK and internationally.

In October 2026, Gunning won the Sports Personality award at the Ethnicity Awards, recognising his work across sport, television presenting and advocacy for equality and inclusion.
