= Yohan Eskrick-Parkinson =

Canadian diver and bobsledder (born 2000)

Personal information
- Full name: Yohan Dion Eskrick-Parkinson
- Nationality: Canadian, Jamaican
- Born: 22 June 2000 (age 26) Calgary, Alberta, Canada

Sport
- Country: Canada
- Sport: Diving, Bobsleigh
- Events: Two-man, Four-man (bobsleigh)
Medal record
Men's bobsleigh
Representing Canada
Pan American Championships
| Gold medal – first place | 2025 Whistler | Four-man |

Yohan Dion Eskrick-Parkinson (born 22 June 2000) is a Canadian-Jamaican diver and bobsledder. In bobsleigh, he represented Canada at the 2026 Winter Olympics.

== Career ==
=== Diving ===
Eskrick-Parkinson was recruited to diving at a young age after a local coach noticed his lack of fear of heights on the diving board. He went on to join Dive Calgary, and competed in the Canadian junior nationals in diving from ages 11–18. In college, Eskrick-Parkinson joined the diving team of Northwestern University, and competed regularly in Big Ten Conference diving events. While at Northwestern, Eskrick-Parkinson reached out to Jamaican diver Yona Knight-Wisdom, and the two formed the first synchronized diving team representing Jamaica. The pair first competed together in Scotland at the Scottish national and open diving championships in 2021. The duo appeared at the 2023 and 2024 World Aquatics Championships as well as the 2024 Diving World Cup both as a team and in individual events, with the goal of qualifying for the 2024 Summer Olympics in Paris. While Knight-Wisdom would qualify and appear at the games, Eskrick-Parkinson was unable to finish well enough to qualify himself.

=== Bobsleigh ===
After failing to qualify for the 2024 Summer Olympics, Eskrick-Parkinson initially intended to end his sporting career and pursue medical school. After returning home to Calgary, he came in contact with one of his former weight coaches, Lascelles Brown, who was an Olympic bronze medalist in bobsleigh for Canada. Brown convinced Eskrick-Parkinson to try bobsleigh, and he began training as part of Canada's national team in 2024. In his first competitive appearance, at the IBSF Pan American Championships in November 2024, he earned a gold medal in four-man as a pusher for the team of Taylor Austin. He earned two more gold medals in North America cup competition immediately after, marking three victories in his first three bobsleigh starts. In 2025, he began to compete full-time in the Bobsleigh World Cup.

Eskrick-Parkinson was selected as part of Canada's bobsleigh team for the 2026 Winter Olympics as a pusher for the team of Jay Dearborn in four-man. The team placed 20th in the event.

== Personal life ==
Eskrick-Parkinson has Jamaican heritage, and holds dual citizenship with both Canada and Jamaica. He graduated from Northwestern University in 2022 with a degree in neuroscience.
