= UK Black Pride =

Queer pride in UK aiming towards people of colour

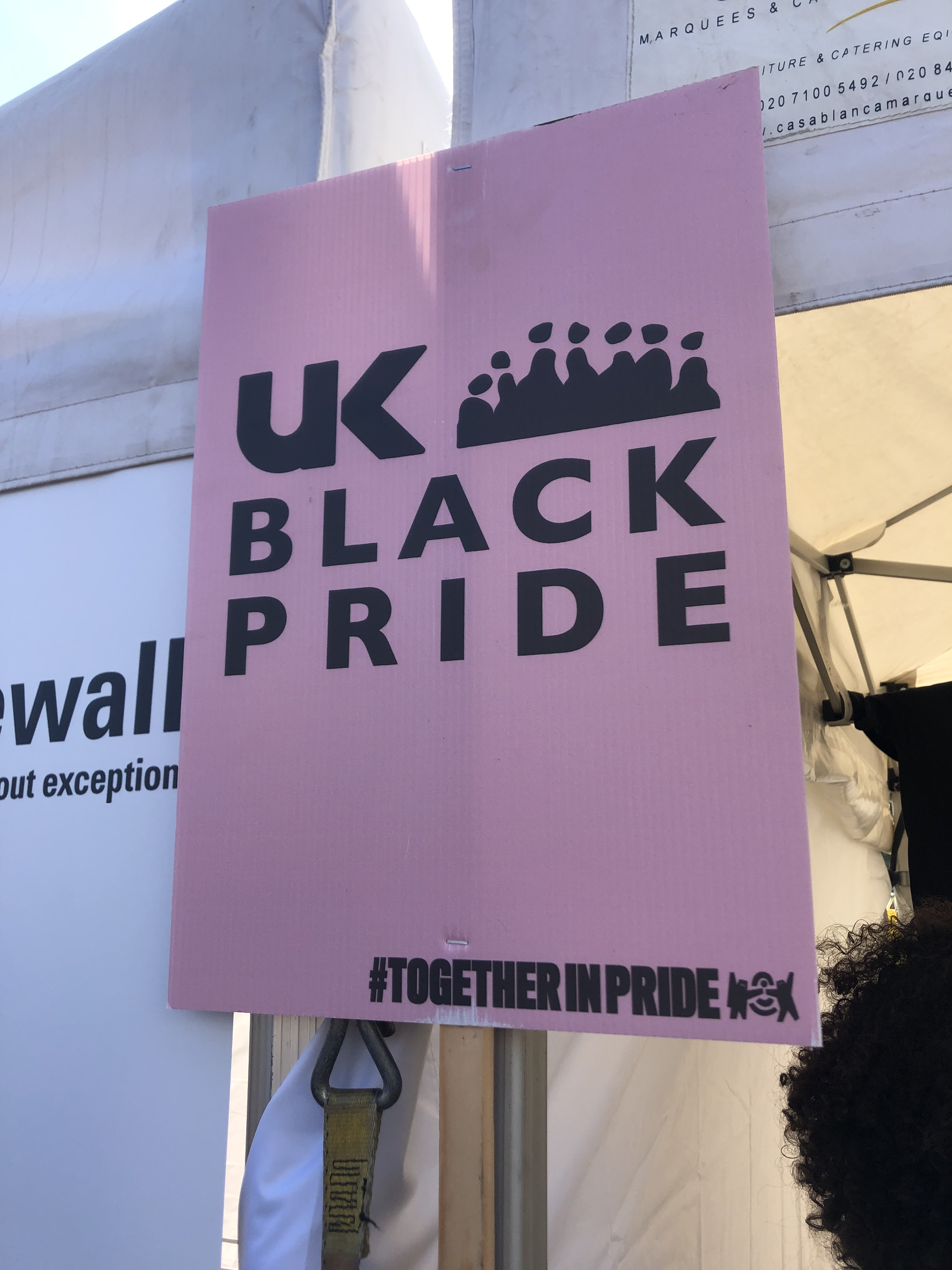
- Poster from 2019
- Status: Active
- Genre: Black gay pride
- Frequency: Annual
- Venue: Queen Elizabeth Olympic Park
- Coordinates: 51.54615°N 0.01269°W
- Country: United Kingdom
- Founded: 2005
- Most recent: 14 August 2022
- Next event: 19 August 2023
- Attendance: 25,000 (2022)
- Website: Official website

UK Black Pride (UKBP) is a black gay pride event in London that has taken place since 2005. It is Europe's largest celebration of African, Asian, Middle Eastern, Latin American and Caribbean heritage lesbian, gay, bisexual, transgender, and queer (LGBTQ) people attracting about 25,000 people annually.

Event co-founder Phyllis Akua Opoku-Gyimah, also known as Lady Phyll, is executive director.

== History ==
UK Black Pride began in 2005 as a day trip to Southend-on-Sea by members of the online social network Black Lesbians in the UK (BLUK).

On Sunday 8 July 2018, approximately 7,500 people attended UK Black Pride at Vauxhall Pleasure Gardens.

Stonewall, Europe's largest LGBT rights charity, withdrew its support from the Pride in London festival in 2018, following concerns over the event's "lack of diversity". The charity instead partnered with UK Black Pride, agreed on a joint programme of work in 2019, including the appointment by Stonewall of a full-time member of staff to work with UK Black Pride and BAME community groups.

In July 2019, British Vogue published an interview with the UK Black Pride co-founder where she discussed the need for a black LGBT pride event in the UK.

== See also ==
- Pride in London
- Black gay pride
- Black Lesbian and Gay Centre
