= Jamaica at the 2011 World Aquatics Championships =

Sporting event delegation

Flag of Jamaica

Jamaica competed at the 2011 World Aquatics Championships in Shanghai, China between July 16 and 31, 2011.

== Swimming ==
Jamaica qualified 2 swimmers.

Men

Athlete	Event	Heats		Semifinals		Final	
Athlete	Event	Time	Rank	Time	Rank	Time	Rank
Brad Hamilton	Men's 100m Freestyle	DNS		did not advance			
Brad Hamilton	Men's 100m Butterfly	56.48	47	did not advance			

Women

Athlete	Event	Heats		Semifinals		Final	
Athlete	Event	Time	Rank	Time	Rank	Time	Rank
Victoria Ho	Women's 200m Freestyle	DNS		did not advance			
Victoria Ho	Women's 400m Freestyle	DNS				did not advance	
