= Flag of Jamaica =

Jamaica
- Other names: The Cross, Black, green and gold
- Use: National flag, civil and state ensign
- Proportion: 1:2
- Adopted: 6 August 1962; 64 years ago
- Design: A gold diagonal cross divides the field into four triangles of green (top and bottom) and black (hoist side and fly side)
- Designed by: Reverend William McGhie
- Use: Civil ensign
- Design: A Red Ensign with the national flag in the canton
- Use: Naval ensign
- Design: A White Ensign with the national flag in the canton
- Use: Air force ensign
- Design: The national flag in the canton with a logo of the JDF Air Wing in the middle

The first proposed design for the Jamaican flag

Another proposal for the Jamaican flag

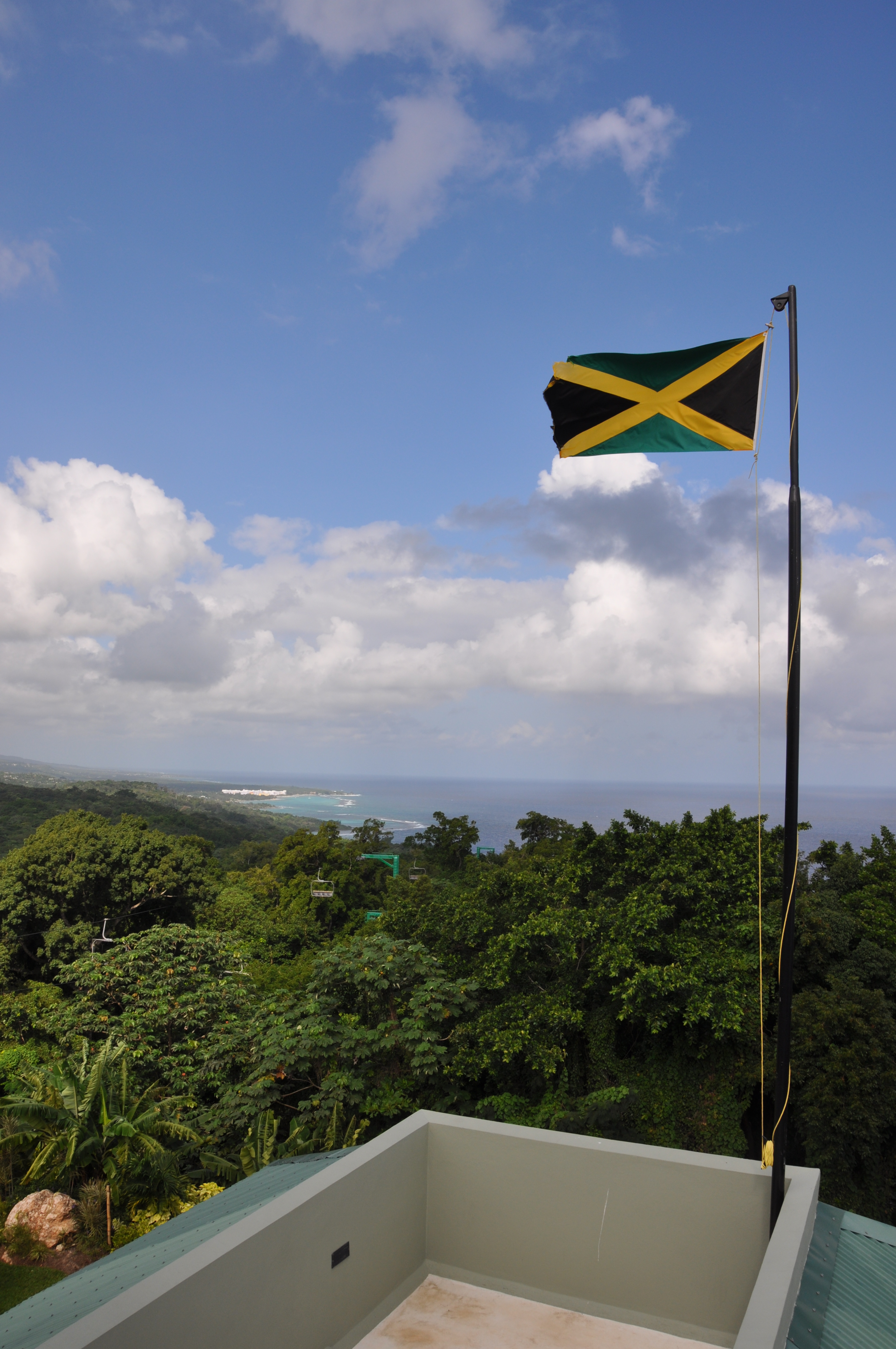
Jamaican flag waving above a house roof

The flag of Jamaica was adopted on 6 August 1962, the day Jamaica became independent from the United Kingdom. The flag consists of a gold saltire, which divides the flag into four sections: two of them green (top and bottom) and two black (hoist and fly). Jamaica's national flag is also sometimes referred to as "The Cross" or as the "Black, Green, and Gold" due to its form and colours. The flag of Jamaica has been said to have been directly inspired by the national flag of Scotland.

== Design and symbolism ==
Prior to Jamaica's independence, the Jamaican government ran a flag design competition for Jamaica's new flag. Over 360 designs were submitted, and several of these original submissions are housed in the National Library of Jamaica. However, the competition failed to yield a winner, and a bipartisan committee of the Jamaican House of Representatives eventually came up with the modern design. It was originally designed with horizontal stripes, but this was considered too similar to the flag of Tanganyika (as it was in 1962), and so the saltire was substituted. John McGhie claims the saltire design was directly inspired by the flag of Scotland.

An earlier interpretation of the colours was "hardships there are but the land is green and the sun shineth", as stated in the government Ministry Paper No. 28 – Jamaican National Flag dated 22 May 1962. Gold recalls the shining sun, black reflects hardships, and green represents the land. It was changed in 1996 to black representing the strength and creativity of the people which has allowed them to overcome difficulties, gold for the wealth of the country and the golden sunshine, and green for the lush vegetation of the island, as well as hope. The change was made on the recommendation of the committee to Examine National Symbols and National Observances appointed by the then Prime Minister P. J. Patterson and chaired by Rex Nettleford. The flag is blazoned: Per saltire vert and sable, a saltire Or.

Since the change of the flag of Mauritania in 2017, Jamaica's is the only flag of a sovereign country without the colours of white, red, or blue.

=== Construction details, sizes and colours ===
The flag has a length-to-width ratio of 1:2, which means that the length is twice as long as the breadth. The normal proportions are 1.5 by 3 meters (4.9 by 9.8 feet).

Flag construction sheet

The colours of the flag are officially set through the Pantone Matching System as Pantone 109 C for fabric and Pantone 109 U for matte paper for a shade of gold, Pantone 355 C for fabric and Pantone 355 U for matte paper for a shade of green. Black is not defined by the exact Pantone colour; it is defined as 100 percent black.

Colour values	Gold		Green		Black
Type	Coated	Uncoated	Coated	Uncoated	Black
Colour name	109 C	109 U	355 C	355 U	Black C
HEX	#FFD100	#FFC700	#009639	#19975D	#2d2926
RGB	255, 209, 0	255, 199, 0	0, 150, 57	25, 151, 93	45, 41, 38
CMYK	0, 18, 100, 0	0, 22, 100, 0	100, 0, 62, 41	83, 0, 38, 41	0, 9, 16, 82
HSV/HSB	49°, 100%, 100%	47°, 100%, 100%	143°, 100%, 59%	152°, 83%, 59%	26°, 16%, 18%

== Etiquette ==
Standard etiquette applies in Jamaica to use of the national flag, primarily ensuring it is always the primary flag flown and is in good condition. The National Flag Code (a set of rules that owners of a flag should follow) was instituted by the government.

Jamaica's state ensign is a Blue Ensign with the Jamaican national flag in the canton; it is normally only used by the Jamaican Government. Jamaica's naval ensign follows the British system and is a White Ensign with a Saint George's Cross and the Jamaican national flag in the canton, although due to the island's lack of a navy, it is normally only used by the Jamaican Coast Guard.

== Historical flags ==
1875–1906

1906–1957

1957–1962

1962

Proposal #5 (1962)

== See also ==
- List of Jamaican flags
- Jamaica coalition (politics)
