= Elektra Fence =

British drag queen

- Born: Julian Riley; 1991 or 1992 (age 33–34); Burnley, Lancashire, England
- Occupation: Drag queen
- Television: RuPaul's Drag Race UK (series 3)

Julian Riley, known professionally as Elektra Fence, is an English drag queen who is best known for being a contestant on the third series of RuPaul's Drag Race UK in 2021.

== Early life and career ==
Julian Riley was born in Burnley, Lancashire, to Ann and Ian Riley, parents with cerebral palsy. He is one of three children. One of his brothers, Anthony, died when he was a teenager. His first experience with drag was secretly wearing his mother's nightgowns. He later began performing in drag under the stage name Elektra Fence, a name selected after a video of him touching an electric fence went viral on social media. He describes himself as the "pocket rocket of drag".

In 2021, Elektra Fence was announced as one of the contestants competing in the third series of RuPaul's Drag Race UK. Following the first episode, she found herself in the bottom two against Anubis Finch and won the lip sync to "Sweet Melody" by Little Mix. The following week, she found herself in the bottom two again, this time against Vanity Milan and was eliminated after lip syncing to "Moving on Up by M People.

In 2022, Elektra Fence was subject to a homophobic assault on a train. Later that year, she embarked on the RuPaul's Drag Race UK: The Official Tour alongside the cast of the third series. Furthermore, she spoke to the Parliament of the United Kingdom regarding cerebral palsy in October of that year.

== Personal life ==
Elektra Fence is trained in ballet, freestyle, disco, ballroom, Latin, and pole dancing. She has cited her inspirations to be Bet Lynch (portrayed by Julie Goodyear) and Jane McDonald. She has run the London Marathon benefitting disability charity Scope. Her father, Ian, passed away after a short illness in 2022.

== Filmography ==
=== Television ===
Year	Title	Notes	Ref
2021	RuPaul's Drag Race UK	Contestant Series 3 (11th Place)	

=== Stage ===
Year	Title	Promoter	Locations	Ref
2022	RuPaul's Drag Race UK: The Official Tour	Voss Events / World of Wonder	Ipswich, Oxford, Edinburgh, Glasgow, Newcastle, Nottingham, Bournemouth, Southend, Manchester, Sheffield, Blackpool, Llandudno, Birmingham, Cardiff, Liverpool, Basingstoke, Portsmouth, Plymouth, London, Derby, Bristol, Bradford, Aberdeen, Southampton, Stockton, Brighton and Newport	
