= Krystal Versace =

British drag queen

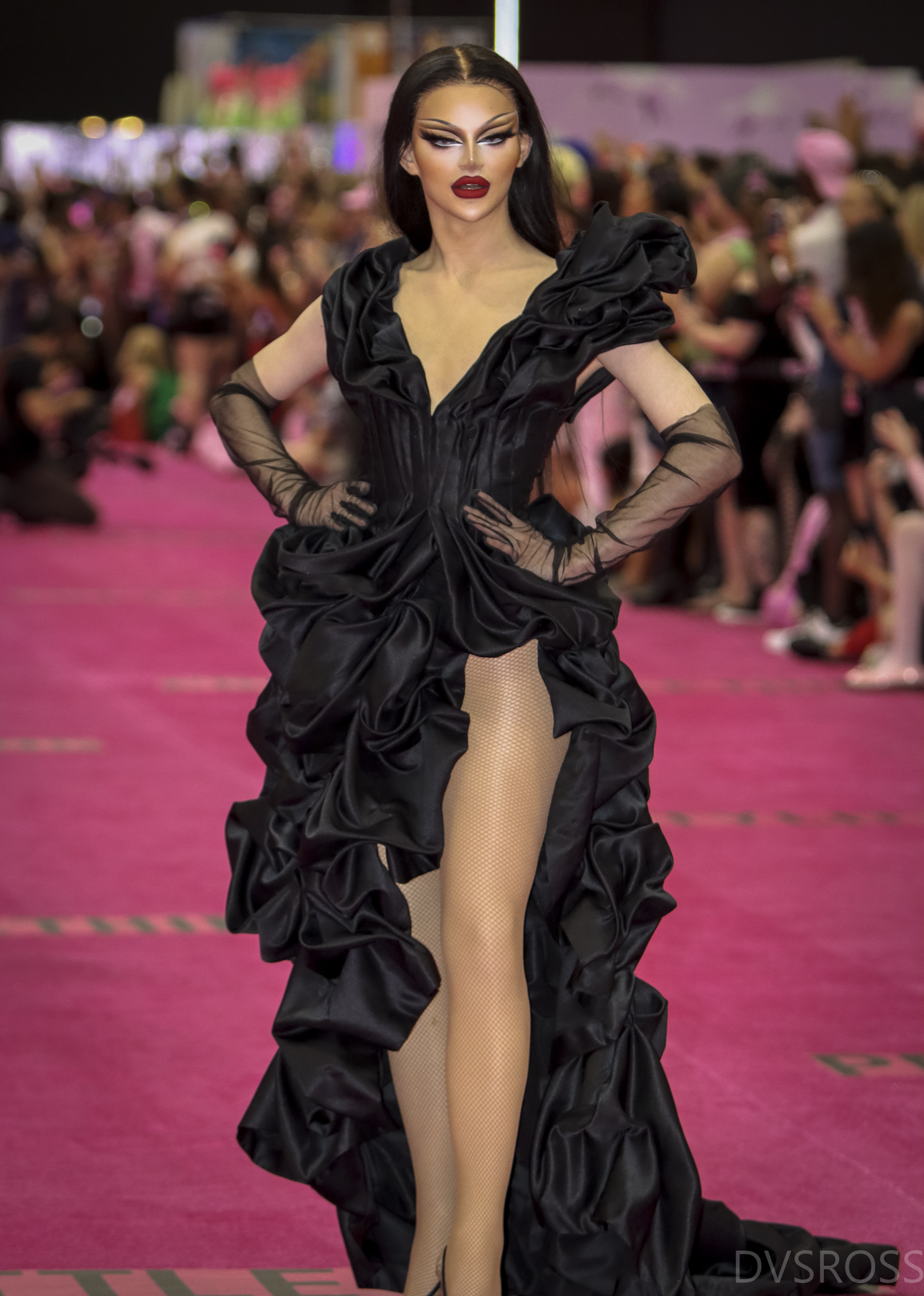
- Krystal Versace at RuPaul's DragCon LA, 2022
- Born: Luke Fenn; 10 October 2001 (age 24); Royal Tunbridge Wells, Kent, United Kingdom
- Education: North Kent College
- Occupation: Drag queen
- Television: RuPaul's Drag Race UK (series 3)
- Website: krystalversace.komi.io

Luke Fenn (born 10 October 2001), professionally known as Krystal Versace, is an English drag queen best known for winning the third series of the reality show RuPaul's Drag Race UK. Crowned at the age of 19, Krystal is the youngest ever Drag Race winner. She is from Tunbridge Wells in Kent and has Greek Cypriot heritage via her maternal grandmother, being the first descendant of Cypriots to compete in the franchise.

== Career ==
Krystal Versace started doing drag at the age of 13. She was inspired to start drag after watching Sasha Velour compete on RuPaul's Drag Race. In August 2021, she was announced as one of the twelve contestants to be competing on the third series of RuPaul's Drag Race UK. She won the first two main challenges, one of which including a top two lip sync against Victoria Scone to "Total Eclipse of the Heart" by Bonnie Tyler. In the ninth episode, she landed on bottom two with Vanity Milan and had to lip sync to "Hallucinate" by Dua Lipa, ultimately winning and moving on to the top three alongside Ella Vaday and Kitty Scott-Claus. As part of the last main challenge, they had to write, record, and perform their own verse to a remix of "Hey Sis, It's Christmas" by RuPaul. After a lip sync for the crown to Dusty Springfield's cover of "You Don't Own Me", Krystal Versace was declared victorious, becoming not only the franchise's youngest finalist, but also the youngest ever winner.

== Personal life ==
Fenn uses she/her pronouns while in drag and he/him pronouns out of drag. Fenn is dyslexic. He attended North Kent College and graduated with a level 2 make-up qualification in 2019. Her best friend and "drag sister" is fellow Drag Race alum DeDeLicious.

== Discography ==
=== As lead artist ===
| Title | Year | Album |
|---|---|---|
| "We Werk Together" (with Ant & Dec, The Vivienne, and Lawrence Chaney) | 2022 | Non-album single |

=== As featured artist ===
| Year | Title | Album |
|---|---|---|
| 2021 | "B.D.E. (Big Drag Energy) [Slice Girls]" (The cast of RuPaul's Drag Race UK Series 3) | Non-album single |
| 2021 | "Hey Sis, It's Christmas" (RuPaul featuring the cast of RuPaul's Drag Race UK Series 3) | Non-album single |

== Filmography ==
=== Television ===
| Year | Title | Role | Notes | Ref. |
|---|---|---|---|---|
| 2021 | RuPaul's Drag Race UK | Self (contestant) | Series 3; Winner | |
| 2022 | Ant & Dec's Saturday Night Takeaway | Self | Performed as part of the End of the Show Show | |
| 2022 | RuPaul's Drag Race UK | Self | Series 4; Special guest | |
| 2023 | Keeping Up with Krystal Versace | Self | | |

=== Web series ===
| Year | Title | Role | Notes | Ref. |
|---|---|---|---|---|
| 2021 | Cosmo Queens UK | Self | Cosmopolitan UK | |
| 2021 | Kita and Anita's Happy Hour | Self | Podcast; Guest | |
| 2026 | THE UK HUN TEA with Raven Podcast | Self | Podcast; Guest | [15] |

=== Music videos ===
| Year | Title | Artist(s) | Ref. |
|---|---|---|---|
| 2021 | "Good Ones" (Drag Performance Video) | Charli XCX | [16] |

Awards and achievements
| Preceded by Lawrence Chaney | Winner of RuPaul's Drag Race UK; Series 3 (2021) | Succeeded by Danny Beard |
