= The Courtney Act Show =

2018 British TV special

- Presented by: Courtney Act
- Starring: Bianca Del Rio; Adore Delano; Leona Lewis; Will Young; Darienne Lake
- Theme music composer: Steve Kipner; Wayne Wilkins; Andre Merritt
- Opening theme: "Ugly" by Courtney Act
- Country of origin: United Kingdom

Production
- Executive producer: Michael Kelpie
- Production location: The London Studios
- Running time: 44 minutes (approx.); 60 minutes (inc. breaks)
- Production companies: Open Mike Productions; Jon Holman

Original release
- Network: Channel 4
- Release: 24 December 2018

The Courtney Act Show is a one-off television special, starring Australian recording artist and drag queen Courtney Act, produced for Channel 4, that aired on 24 December 2018 at 9:30 pm. The programme was hosted by Act herself and featured a host of other performers. Act performed songs from her debut extended play, Kaleidoscope as well performing Christmas themed songs, and the programme also featured performances from other musical acts as well as interviews conducted by Act. The programme received mixed reviews from critics and was watched by 3 million people.

== Production ==
Tabloid newspaper The Sun published a report on 21 November 2018 claiming that Act would receive £50,000 for appearing in a programme entitled The Courtney Act Show; Channel 4 confirmed the programme two days later, with Act saying that she would be "working with some of [her] favourite artists". The programme was recorded through the week beginning 7 December at The London Studios and images of Act performing the song "Baby It's Cold Outside", whilst performing with Leona Lewis, were released.
