= Anubis Finch =

British drag queen

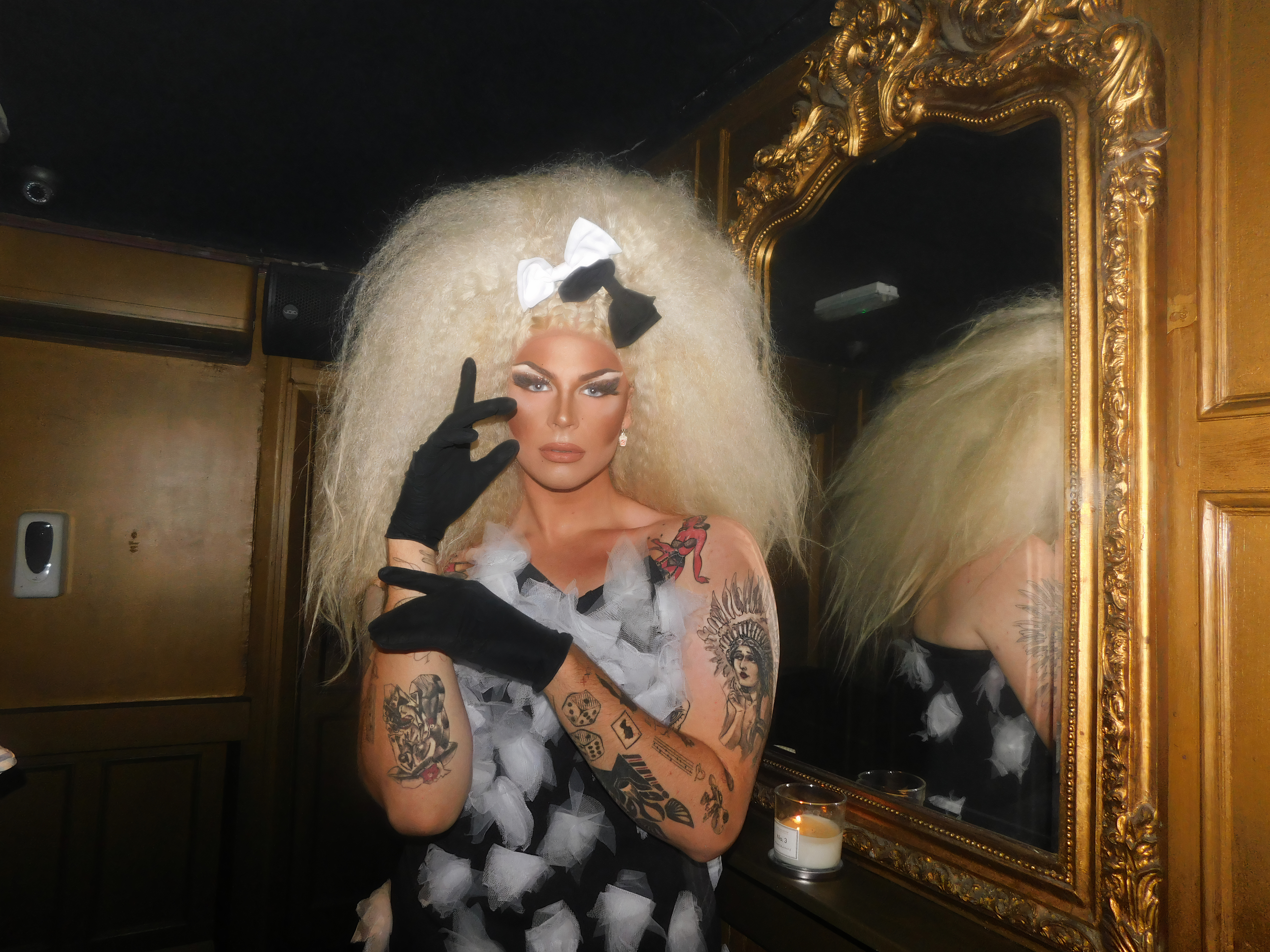
- Anubis Finch at Proud Cabaret, Brighton, United Kingdom
- Born: Charli Paul Frank Monét Finch; 14 August 2001 (age 24); Seaford, East Sussex, England
- Occupations: Drag queen; singer
- Television: RuPaul's Drag Race UK (series 3)
- Website: anubisfinch.com

Charli Paul Frank Monét Finch (born 14 August 2001), known professionally as Anubis Finch, or mononymously as Anubis, is an English drag queen and singer who is best known for being a contestant on the third series of RuPaul's Drag Race UK in 2021. He has also released an album, Rebiiirth (2023), an extended play, Anubis (2019) as well as four singles.

== Early life ==
Charli Finch was born on 14 August 2001 in Seaford, East Sussex. At the age of 16, he began performing as a drag queen under the name Anubis Finch, a name he chose to pay homage to his late father's Egyptian heritage. She studied Performing Arts at East Sussex College. During her time there, the portrayed the titular character in Shrek the Musical.

== Career ==
Anubis began performing musically at the age of 13. She has a four-octave range and has worked with Columbia Records and Decca Records. Anubis has additionally provided demo and backing vocals for Zara Larsson, Rita Ora, Adam Lambert, and Paloma Faith. Her musical inspirations include Ella Fitzgerald, Connie Francis, Billie Holiday, Dinah Washington, Celine Dion, and Lady Gaga.

In 2019, Anubis released an extended play Anubis. and later that year a cover of "Have Yourself A Merry Little Christmas". In 2020, Anubis released another single, "Home". In 2021, Anubis was announced as one of the contestants competing on the third series of RuPaul's Drag Race UK. Anubis was the first contestant to be eliminated from the competition after losing a lip sync against Elektra Fence. Despite this, he was later crowned Miss Congeniality by their fellow competitors.

In 2022, Finch released the single "Wonderland" and embarked on the RuPaul's Drag Race UK: The Official Tour alongside the cast of series 3. In 2023, Charity Kase and Anubis announced an 11-date tour, called The Nightmares Before Christmas Tour.

== Personal life ==
Anubis is based in Brighton, East Sussex. Her fashion and theatrical inspirations are Iris Apfel, Wicked, Dr. Seuss, The Muppets, and Disney villains. She identifies as bisexual.

== Filmography ==
=== Television ===
Year	Title	Notes	Ref
2021	RuPaul's Drag Race UK	Contestant Series 3 (12th Place; Miss Congeniality)	

=== Stage ===
Year	Title	Promoter	Locations	Ref
2022	RuPaul's Drag Race UK: The Official Tour	Voss Events / World of Wonder	Ipswich, Oxford, Edinburgh, Glasgow, Newcastle, Nottingham, Bournemouth, Southend, Manchester, Sheffield, Blackpool, Llandudno, Birmingham, Cardiff, Liverpool, Basingstoke, Portsmouth, Plymouth, London, Derby, Bristol, Bradford, Aberdeen, Southampton, Stockton, Brighton and Newport	

== Discography ==
=== Albums ===
Year	Album	Ref
2023	Rebiiirth	

=== Extended plays ===
Year	Album	Ref
2019	Anubis	

=== Singles ===
Year	Song	Ref
2019	Have Yourself a Merry Little Christmas	
2020	Home	
2022	Wonderland	
2023	Jealous (Live Lounge Version)	
