= Death Drop =

British play

- Written by: Holly Stars

Premiere
- Date premiered: 10 December 2020
- Place premiered: Garrick Theatre

Death Drop is a play written by Holly Stars based on an original idea by Christopher D. Clegg. The play is a "Dragatha Christie murder-mystery" set in 1991 on Tuck Island during a soirée for Princess Diana and Prince Charles' tenth wedding anniversary.

== Plot ==
=== Act 1 ===
It is a dark and stormy night at Shantay Manor on remote Tuck Island where Lady von Fistenberg has invited a series of top celebrities to gather for her annual dinner party in honour of Prince Charles and Lady Diana's tenth anniversary. As each guest arrives, various rivalries and alliances take shape. 'World Of The News' editor Morgan Pierce brings her camera and tape recorder, convinced that the royal couple themselves will join them for the evening. Conservative MP Rich Whiteman is also a guest and confronts Pierce, upset that his reporters have been harassing his wife with repeated calls, trying to speak with him. Meteorologist and television personality Summer Raines enters and is subjected to a tirade by MP Whiteman about how he considers women to be stupid and helpless. Television producer Phil Maker arrives, bragging about a brief encounter with a woman on the train, before realising that it was Raines he had been with. Maker also states that Pierce had published embarrassing photos of a night out he had had with a pop star. Shazza (the pop star) then arrives, announcing that the island is now cut off as a tree has blocked the bridge. Later we find out the Shazza fears she is losing her celebrity status. Each guest admits they don't actually know Lady von Fistenberg but accepted the invitation regardless. Throughout the evening Lady von Fistenberg and her guests are assisted in turn one by one of the Bottomley triplets, Blue, Brie and Spread (we only see one at a time as all three are played by the same actress). The electricity flickers and the phone line is cut. After eating one of the Bottomley sisters' crispy filled pancakes, Raines becomes violently ill and dies from poisoning. Spread Bottomley attempts to serve a tray of Swiss roll but the lights cut off and on, during which time her hands are chopped off. She too falls dead to the floor. Aware they have a murderer in their midst, but with no way to leave the house or to contact the authorities, the guests agree to go to their separate rooms to wait for morning.

=== Act 2 ===
Shazza has left her bedroom late in the night and sings a self-described 'dramatic' number to open Act 2. Maker joins Shazza and attempts to seduce her, but he is electrocuted when trying to turn on the television. The other guests run in to find Shazza with Maker's body. A detective arrives at the door. Dressed in a trenchcoat and speaking with a heavy French accent, he says he is Inspector Gadgee, who has reached the island by boat. He begins to interrogate the guests, who have been accusing each other for the murders as each of them seems to have a motive. Blue and Brie prepare breakfast (with one of the sisters now played by the actor who had played Phil Maker). While discussing their buttering skills a masked ninja bursts in on them and mortally injures Brie. Gadgee believes Pierce to be the killer, but Pierce refuses to be interrogated and decides to leave the manor. As soon as she starts her car outside it explodes. Gadgee is now convinced that MP Richman is the killer after the MP admits Pierce had uncovered his affair with a rentboy named Valentino. The MP is tied to a chair for interrogation, then left alone so Gadgee can look for evidence. While the MP is tied to the chair the mysterious masked figure enters and kills him. As the bodies continue to pile up and with accusations flying, Shazza draws a gun she has found. A ricocheting bullet hits Lady von Fistenberg, who falls to the floor. Blue is shot in the foot, causing her to collapse. With only Shazza and Gadgee left standing, Gadgee removes his hat, moustache and trench coat to reveal he is actually Summer Raines, who had faked her death to get her revenge on each of the guests, as she had longstanding grudges against each of the other celebrities. Lady von Fistenberg recovers, retrieves a pistol and shoots Raines dead. There is a knock on the door and Princess Diana enters, apologising for being late to the party.

== Roles and principal cast ==
Character	West End (2020)	West End (2021)	UK Tour (2021)	West End (2022)
Shazza	Courtney Act	Willam Belli	Willam Belli	Kitty Scott-Claus
Summer Raines	Monét X Change	Latrice Royale	Ra'Jah O'Hara	Jujubee
Lady von Fistenburg	Vinegar Strokes	Myra DuBois	Vinegar Strokes	Vinegar Strokes
Rich Whiteman	LoUis CYfer	LoUis CYfer	Richard Energy	Richard Energy
Phil Maker	Kemah Bob	Don One	Georgia Frost	Georgia Frost
Morgan Pierce	Anna Phylactic	Anna Phylactic	Karen from Finance	Anna Phylactic
Blue Bottomley, Brie Bottomley & Spread Bottomley	Holly Stars	Holly Stars	Holly Stars	Holly Stars
Swing	Eleanor Burke 'Apple Derrières'	Eleanor Burke 'Apple Derrières'	Eleanor Burke 'Apple Derrières'	Eleanor Burke 'Apple Derrières'

== Productions ==
The play began previews at the Garrick Theatre in London on 3 December 2020, with an opening night on 10 December as one of the first West End shows to open following a closure of theatres due to the COVID-19 pandemic with social distancing measure being implemented on the audience. Although scheduled to remain open until 17 January 2021, on 14 December it was announced that London would be placed under Tier 3 COVID restrictions on 16 December forcing the show to close.

On 22 February 2021 it was announced that theatres would be able to reopen from 17 May, and on 11 March it was announced that Death Drop would reopen from 19 May with a new cast being announced on 25 March. Performances between 30 June and 4 July were cancelled due to self-isolation from several of the cast and crew. On 7 July there was a BSL signed performance including Maria Hurtz. It was announced that Courtney Act would re-join the cast as Shazza for the performances on 10 and 11 July. The show then closed on 11 July. Following a UK tour the show reopened for a third limited West End run on 4 March 2022 closing on 24 April 2022.

On April 20, 2023, via the show's official Instagram it was announced that Death Drop would begin a New York run Off-Broadway at New World Stages beginning on June 30, 2023, with an anticipated opening night of July 13. Drag Race alums Willam and Jujubee are announced to be reprising their performances from the London production along with the show's writer, Holly Stars. The cast will also include Shuga Cain, Wang Newton, and Peachez Iman Cummings.

== Critical reception ==
The Guardian: "riotous...rollicking good fun"

Manchester Evening News: "...an esteemed cast - some of the best the world can offer...a camp delight and a great opportunity to see so many queer performers on the stage altogether in one place. It's extravagant, fun, and ridiculous in the best possible way."
