= Queens for the Night =

British reality competition television series

- Genre: Reality competition
- Creative director: Mark Jennings
- Presented by: Lorraine Kelly
- Judges: Courtney Act; Rob Beckett; Melanie C; Layton Williams
- Country of origin: United Kingdom
- Original language: English

Production
- Executive producer: Karen Smith
- Producer: Rory Dalziel
- Production company: Tuesday's Child

Original release
- Network: ITV
- Release: 5 November 2022

Queens for the Night is a British reality television competition that sees a group of celebrities become drag queens. It aired on 5 November 2022 on ITV. It was presented by Lorraine Kelly with Courtney Act, Rob Beckett, Melanie C and Layton Williams serving as judges. The competition was won by Coronation Street actor Simon Gregson as his drag alter-ego "Bidet Bardot", who performed a comedy performance mentored by Myra DuBois.

== Format ==
The one-off television special features six celebrities paired with their very own drag mentor as they unleash their drag alter-egos and attempt to master the art of drag. Each celebrity drag queen undergoes a transformation before enacting either singing, dancing, lip syncing, impressions or comedy in front of a panel of judges and a live studio audience with one celebrity being crowned the winner. The format has been compared to the American reality series RuPaul's Secret Celebrity Drag Race.

== Production ==
In February 2022, Ant & Dec performed in drag during the "End of the Show Show" segment on Ant & Dec's Saturday Night Takeaway, and it was later reported in May that the positive reaction to the performance and the success of RuPaul's Drag Race UK on BBC Three had been a factor in ITV commissioning Queens for the Night, a one-off reality television competition that sees celebrities undergoing drag transformations. The show was officially announced by ITV in June 2022, and is created and produced by the company Tuesday's Child. Following the commissioning of the show, head of ITV entertainment Katie Rawcliffe said "[The show would] have all the wow factor you would expect from this wonderful celebration of drag, and the perfect way to showcase everything that makes drag performance such a sensation."

== Celebrities ==
The celebrities competing in the series and their drag mentors were announced on 7 June 2022.

Contestants of Queens for the Night and their mentors
Drag Name	Celebrity	Occupation	Mentor	Outcome
Bidet Bardot	Simon Gregson	Coronation Street actor	Myra DuBois	Winner
Proteina Turner	Mr Motivator	Fitness instructor	Asttina Mandella	Runner-up
Orla Feelz	Chris Hughes	Television personality & model	Margo Marshall	Third place
Dame Shelley Sassy	George Shelley	Union J singer	La Voix	Eliminated
Madame MiMi D'YooYoo	Adam Woodyatt	EastEnders actor	Kitty Scott-Claus	Eliminated
Trixie Turnover	Joe Marler	Rugby player	Blu Hydrangea	Eliminated

== Performances ==
Contestants' performances on Queens for the Night
Order	Drag Name	Celebrity	Mentor	Category	Result
1	Bidet Bardot	Simon Gregson	Myra DuBois	Comedy	Winner
2	Dame Shelley Sassy	George Shelley	La Voix	Singing	Eliminated
3	Proteina Turner	Mr Motivator	Asttina Mandella	Lip syncing	Runner-up
4	Trixie Turnover	Joe Marler	Blu Hydrangea	Magic	Eliminated
5	Orla Feelz	Chris Hughes	Margo Marshall	Dance	Third place
6	Madame MiMi D'YooYoo	Adam Woodyatt	Kitty Scott-Claus	Impressions	Eliminated
