= Fight for Love (Courtney Act song) =

Single by Courtney Act
- Released: 19 December 2018
- Length: 2:56
- Label: Self-released
- Songwriter(s): Danny Shah; Felicity Birt; Courtney Act; Sky Adams

Courtney Act singles chronology
"Stayin' Alive" (2016)	"Fight for Love" (2018)	"Brenda! Call Me" (2021)

"Fight for Love" is a song by Australian drag queen and singer Courtney Act, released on 19 December 2018 as her entry for the Eurovision - Australia Decides final, which took place in February 2019 to decide who would represent Australia in the Eurovision Song Contest 2019, to be held in Tel Aviv in May 2019. The song finished in 4th place with 52 points.

== Background ==
Act told news.com.au: "A sweet 16 years after Australian Idol, I have the chance to show Australia how I have grown as an artist and a performer [...] I've sat at home every year since Guy Sebastian competed [at Eurovision] in 2015 and have been so keen to be a part of it." Act met the writers of the song at Kylie Minogue’s 50th birthday party; where one of the writers told Act that he loved her on Celebrity Big Brother and that he would love to work with her.

== Critical reception ==
Express.co.uk called the song "uptempo dance-floor anthem that could go down a storm in Tel Aviv" and a "banger all about coming together and fighting for the things we believe in".
