= RuPaul's Drag Race UK series 3 =

2021 series of RuPaul's Drag Race UK

RuPaul's Drag Race UK
- Series 3
- Promotional poster for series three
- Hosted by: RuPaul
- Judges: RuPaul; Michelle Visage; Alan Carr; Graham Norton
- No. of contestants: 12
- Winner: Krystal Versace
- Runners-up: Ella Vaday; Kitty Scott-Claus
- No. of episodes: 10

Release
- Original network: BBC Three / BBC One (UK); WOW Presents Plus (International)
- Original release: 23 September – 25 November 2021

Season chronology
- ← Previous; Series 2 Next → Series 4

The third series of RuPaul's Drag Race UK began airing on 23 September 2021.

The cast of the third series was officially announced on 18 August 2021 on social media. The series saw the return of Veronica Green, who was forced to withdraw from the second series of the show after testing positive for COVID-19, and received an open invitation for the third series. The series also welcomed Victoria Scone, the franchise's first ever cisgender female contestant since its beginning in 2009.

The winner of the third series of RuPaul's Drag Race UK was Krystal Versace, being the youngest person to ever win a season of the franchise, with Ella Vaday and Kitty Scott-Claus as the runners-up.

== Production ==
In November 2020, BBC confirmed plans to air a third series, and casting closed the same month. The series was filmed in March 2021, in Manchester.

BBC Three shared a seven-second teaser for the series on social media on 21 June 2021.

== Contestants ==
Ages, names, and cities stated are at time of filming.

Contestants of RuPaul's Drag Race UK series 3 and their backgrounds
Contestant	Age	Hometown	Outcome
Krystal Versace	19	Royal Tunbridge Wells, England	Winner
Ella Vaday	32	Dagenham, England	Runners-up
Kitty Scott-Claus	29	Birmingham, England	Runners-up
Vanity Milan	29	South London, England	4th place
Scarlett Harlett	26	East London, England	5th place
Choriza May	30	Newcastle upon Tyne, England	6th place
River Medway	22	Medway, England	6th place
Charity Kase	24	Rufford, England	8th place
Veronica Green (Note: Veronica Green was removed from the second series due to testing positive for COVID-19, and was invited back to compete this series.)	35	Rochdale, England	9th place
Victoria Scone	27	Cardiff, Wales	10th place (Note: Victoria Scone was forced to withdraw from the competition due to injury.)
Elektra Fence	29	Burnley, England	11th place
Anubis (Note: Anubis Finch is referred to as Anubis on the show.)	19	Brighton, England	12th place

== Contestant progress ==
Legend:

Krystal Versace won RuPaul's Drag Race UK series 3.
Ella Vaday and Kitty Scott-Claus were the runners-up.
WIN indicates that the contestant won the challenge.
TOP2 indicates that the contestant was one of the two best performing in the challenge, but lost the lip sync to win it.
SAFE indicates that the contestant was declared safe by the judges.
BTM (Bottom) indicates that the contestant was up for elimination.
ELIM (Eliminated) indicates that the contestant was eliminated.
WDR (Withdraw) indicates that Victoria Scone was removed from the competition due to injury.
Guest indicates that the contestant returned as a guest.

Contestants progress with placements in each episode
Contestant	Episode									
Contestant	1	2	3	4	5	6	7	8	9	10
Krystal Versace	WIN	WIN	SAFE	SAFE	SAFE	SAFE	SAFE	SAFE	BTM	Winner
Ella Vaday	SAFE	SAFE	SAFE	WIN	SAFE	WIN	SAFE	WIN	WIN	Runner-up
Kitty Scott-Claus	SAFE	SAFE	SAFE	SAFE	SAFE	SAFE	WIN	WIN	SAFE	Runner-up
Vanity Milan	SAFE	BTM	BTM	WIN	SAFE	SAFE	BTM	SAFE	ELIM	Guest
Scarlett Harlett	SAFE	SAFE	WIN	BTM	BTM	SAFE	ELIM		Guest	Guest
Choriza May	SAFE	SAFE	SAFE	WIN	SAFE	ELIM			Guest	Guest
River Medway	SAFE	SAFE	SAFE	WIN	SAFE	ELIM			Guest	Guest
Charity Kase	SAFE	SAFE	SAFE	BTM	ELIM				Guest	Guest
Veronica Green	SAFE	SAFE	ELIM						Guest	Guest
Victoria Scone	TOP2	SAFE	WDR						Guest	Guest
Elektra Fence	BTM	ELIM							Guest	Guest
Anubis	ELIM								Guest	Guest

== Lip syncs ==
Legend:

The contestant won the lip sync to win the challenge.
The contestant was eliminated after their first time in the bottom.
The contestant was eliminated after their second time in the bottom.
The contestant was eliminated after their third time in the bottom.
The contestant was eliminated after their fourth time in the bottom.
The contestant won the Lip Sync for the Crown and was declared the winner of the season.

Episode	Top contestants			Song	Winner
1	Krystal Versace	vs.	Victoria Scone	"Total Eclipse of the Heart" (Bonnie Tyler)	Krystal Versace
1	Bottom contestants			Song	Eliminated
1	Anubis	vs.	Elektra Fence	"Sweet Melody" (Little Mix)	Anubis
2	Vanity Milan	vs.	Elektra Fence	"Moving on Up" (M People)	Elektra Fence
3	Vanity Milan	vs.	Veronica Green	"I've Got the Music in Me" (The Kiki Dee Band)	Veronica Green
4	Charity Kase	vs.	Scarlett Harlett	"Who Do You Think You Are" (Spice Girls)	None
5	Charity Kase	vs.	Scarlett Harlett	"Big Spender" (Shirley Bassey)	Charity Kase
6	Choriza May	vs.	River Medway	"Shout" (Lulu and The Luvvers)	Choriza May
6	Choriza May	vs.	River Medway	"Shout" (Lulu and The Luvvers)	River Medway
7	Scarlett Harlett	vs.	Vanity Milan	"Scandalous" (Mis-Teeq)	Scarlett Harlett
Episode	Top contestants			Song	Winners
8	Ella Vaday	vs.	Kitty Scott-Claus	"Something New" (Girls Aloud)	Ella Vaday
8	Ella Vaday	vs.	Kitty Scott-Claus	"Something New" (Girls Aloud)	Kitty Scott-Claus
Episode	Bottom contestants			Song	Eliminated
9	Krystal Versace	vs.	Vanity Milan	"Hallucinate" (Dua Lipa)	Vanity Milan
Episode	Final contestants			Song	Winner
10	Ella Vaday vs. Kitty Scott-Claus vs. Krystal Versace			"You Don't Own Me" (Dusty Springfield)	Krystal Versace

== Guest judges ==
Listed in chronological order:

- Matt Lucas, actor and comedian
- Oti Mabuse, dancer
- Nicola Coughlan, actress
- Emma Bunton, singer
- Leigh-Anne Pinnock, singer
- Lulu, singer
- Alesha Dixon, singer
- Russell Tovey, actor
- Kathy Burke, actress and comedian

=== Special guests ===
Guests who appeared in episodes, but did not judge on the main stage.

Episode 3

- Raven, runner-up of both RuPaul's Drag Race Season 2 and All Stars 1

Episode 4

- Ian Masterson, producer and songwriter
- Claire Richards, member of Steps
- Lee Latchford-Evans, member of Steps
- Ian "H" Watkins, member of Steps
- Faye Tozer, member of Steps

Episode 6

- Judi Love, stand-up comedian
- Nadine Coyle, singer

Episode 7

- Charity Shop Sue, YouTube personality

Episode 10

- Jay Revell, choreographer

== Episodes ==
No. overall	No. in series	Title	Original release date
19	1	"The Return of Royalty"	23 September 2021
Eleven new queens enter the workroom. Veronica Green, who was forced to withdraw last season due to COVID-19, made a comeback to compete again. For the first mini-challenge, the queens play a game of Ru's Dirty Charade. For the main challenge, the queens present two looks on the runway: Queen of Your Hometown and My Favourite Things. On the runway, Krystal Versace, Scarlett Harlett and Victoria Scone receive positive critiques, with Krystal Versace and Victoria Scone being announced as the top two queens of the week, and will lip-sync for the win. They lip-sync to "Total Eclipse of the Heart" by Bonnie Tyler. After the lip-sync, Krystal Versace is announced as the winner of the challenge. Anubis, Elektra Fence and River Medway receive negative critiques, with River Medway being safe. Anubis and Elektra Fence lip-sync to "Sweet Melody" by Little Mix. Elektra Fence wins the lip-sync and Anubis is the first queen to sashay away.: Guest Judge: Matt Lucas; Alternating Judge: Graham Norton; Mini-Challenge: Ru's Dirty Charade; Main Challenge: Present two looks on the runway; Runway Theme: Queen of Your Hometown and My Favourite Things; Top Two: Krystal Versace and Victoria Scone; Lip-Sync for the Win Song: "Total Eclipse of the Heart" by Bonnie Tyler; Challenge Winner: Krystal Versace; Bottom Two: Anubis and Elektra Fence; Lip-Sync Song: "Sweet Melody" by Little Mix; Eliminated: Anubis; Farewell Message: Camp as tits darling! The Curse of Brighton lives on... Love you all! Anubis
20	2	"Dragoton"	30 September 2021
For this week's main challenge, the queens team up and perform as dance instructors for the brand new fitness concept "Dragoton".: Team Babycizers: Charity Kase, Ella Vaday, Scarlett Harlett, and Victoria Scone; Team Ball Busters: Kitty Scott-Claus, Krystal Versace, River Medway, and Veronica Green; Team Ride or Die: Choriza May, Elektra Fence, and Vanity Milan; On the runway, category is Red Carpet Showstoppers. Kitty Scott-Claus, Krystal Versace, and Veronica Green receive positive critiques, with Krystal Versace winning the challenge. Charity Kase, Elektra Fence, and Vanity Milan receive negative critiques, with Charity Kase being safe. Elektra Fence and Vanity Milan lip-sync to "Moving On Up" by M People. Vanity Milan wins the lip-sync and Elektra Fence sashays away.: Guest Judge: Oti Mabuse; Alternating Judge: Alan Carr; Main Challenge: In teams, perform as dance instructors for the brand new fitness concept "Dragoton"; Runway Theme: Red Carpet Showstoppers; Challenge Winner: Krystal Versace; Bottom Two: Elektra Fence and Vanity Milan; Lip-Sync Song: "Moving On Up" by M People; Eliminated: Elektra Fence; Farewell Message: I couldn't reach. Only joking.. Love Vanity ♡
21	3	"Great Outdoors"	7 October 2021
At the beginning of the episode, it is revealed that Victoria Scone has been removed from the competition due to a knee injury she sustained in Episode One. For this week's mini-challenge, the queens make a profile video for the new dating app "Findhr". Scarlett Harlett wins the mini-challenge. For the main challenge, the queens present two looks on the runway: Happy Campers and Campfire Couture. On the runway, Ella Vaday, Krystal Versace, and Scarlett Harlett receive positive critiques, with Scarlett Harlett winning the challenge. Choriza May, Vanity Milan, and Veronica Green receive negative critiques, with Choriza May being safe. Vanity Milan and Veronica Green lip-sync to "I've Got the Music in Me" by The Kiki Dee Band. Vanity Milan wins the lip-sync and Veronica Green sashays away.: Removed: Victoria Scone; Guest Judge: Nicola Coughlan; Alternating Judge: Graham Norton; Mini-Challenge: Make a profile video for the new dating app "Findhr"; Mini-Challenge Winner: Scarlett Harlett; Main Challenge: Present two looks on the runway; Runway Theme: Happy Campers and Campfire Couture; Challenge Winner: Scarlett Harlett; Bottom Two: Vanity Milan and Veronica Green; Lip-Sync Song: "I've Got the Music in Me" by The Kiki Dee Band; Eliminated: Veronica Green; Farewell Message: The party may be over for me here But I'll see you all at the Afterparty! All my love Veronica Green xxx ☻
22	4	"Big Drag Energy"	14 October 2021
For this week's main challenge, the queens write, record, and perform verses to "B.D.E. (Big Drag Energy)".: Team Pick 'n' Mix: Choriza May, Ella Vaday, River Medway, and Vanity Milan; Team Slice Girls: Charity Kase, Kitty Scott-Claus, Krystal Versace, and Scarlett Harlett; On the runway, category is Night of a Thousand Spice Girls. Team Pick 'n' Mix is the winning team, with Choriza May, Ella Vaday, River Medway, and Vanity Milan all winning the challenge. Team Slice Girls is the losing team. Charity Kase and Scarlett Harlett receive negative critiques, and are announced as the bottom two. They lip-sync to "Who Do You Think You Are" by Spice Girls. They are both declared the winners of the lip-sync and no one goes home.: Guest Judge: Emma Bunton; Alternating Judge: Alan Carr; Main Challenge: Write, record, and perform verses to "B.D.E. (Big Drag Energy)"; Runway Theme: Night of a Thousand Spice Girls; Challenge Winners: Choriza May, Ella Vaday, River Medway, and Vanity Milan; Bottom Two: Charity Kase and Scarlett Harlett; Lip-Sync Song: "Who Do You Think You Are" by Spice Girls; Eliminated: None
23	5	"Draglexa"	21 October 2021
For this week's mini-challenge, the queens play a game called "RuPaul's Dog Race". Krystal Versace and Scarlett Harlett win the mini-challenge. For the main challenge, the queens team up and market their own in-home smart assistant, "Draglexa".: Team Krystal Versace: Charity Kase, Krystal Versace, River Medway, and Vanity Milan; Team Scarlett Harlett: Choriza May, Ella Vaday, Kitty Scott-Claus, and Scarlett Harlett; On the runway, category is Ex-Penny Henny. RuPaul then reveals that both commercials were underwhelming, and reveals that no one will be winning this week's challenge. Charity Kase, Scarlett Harlett, and Vanity Milan receive negative critiques, with Vanity Milan being safe. Charity Kase and Scarlett Harlett lip-sync to "Big Spender" by Shirley Bassey. Scarlett Harlett wins the lip-sync and Charity Kase sashays away.: Guest Judge: Leigh-Anne Pinnock; Alternating Judge: Alan Carr; Mini-Challenge: RuPaul's Dog Race; Mini-Challenge Winners: Krystal Versace and Scarlett Harlett; Main Challenge: In teams, market their own in-home smart assistant, "Draglexa"; Runway Theme: Ex-Penny Henny; Challenge Winner: None; Bottom Two: Charity Kase and Scarlett Harlett; Lip-Sync Song: "Big Spender" by Shirley Bassey; Eliminated: Charity Kase; Farewell Message: See you in your Nightmares skanks! I love you all. Charity Kase♡
24	6	"Snatch Game"	28 October 2021
For this week's mini challenge, the queens read each other to filth. Choriza May wins the mini challenge. For this week's main challenge, the queens play the Snatch Game. Judi Love and Nadine Coyle star as the celebrity contestants. The cast consisted of: Choriza May as Margarita Pracatan; Ella Vaday as Nigella Lawson; Kitty Scott-Claus as Gemma Collins; Krystal Versace as Selina Mosinski (as Charity Shop Sue); River Medway as Amy Childs; Scarlett Harlett as Macaulay Culkin; Vanity Milan as Jocelyn Jee Esien; On the runway, category is Feeling Fruity. Ella Vaday and Kitty Scott-Claus receive positive critiques, with Ella Vaday winning the challenge. Choriza May, Krystal Versace and River Medway receive negative critiques, with Krystal Versace being safe. Choriza May and River Medway lip-sync to "Shout" by Lulu and The Luvvers. After the lip-sync, RuPaul decides to eliminate both Choriza May and River Medway from the competition.: Guest Judge: Lulu; Alternating Judge: Graham Norton; Mini-Challenge: Reading is Fundamental; Mini-Challenge Winners: Choriza May; Main Challenge: Snatch Game; Runway Theme: Feeling Fruity; Challenge Winner: Ella Vaday; Bottom Two: Choriza May and River Medway; Lip-Sync Song: "Shout" by Lulu and The Luvvers; Eliminated: Choriza May and River Medway; Choriza May's Farewell Message: "My peach and my heart will always be full of love for you! Os amo sisters! 🍑 ♡ Choriza May ♡"; River Medway's Farewell Message: "You won girls. Enjoy the badges. I hope you spend it on some lessons in grace and decorum because you have as much grace as a reversing dump truck. Love you all River xxx"
25	7	"The Miss Fugly Beauty Pageant"	4 November 2021
For this week's main challenge, the queens create three looks for The Miss Fugly Beauty Pageant: Fugly Swimwear, Charity Shop Chic and Fugly But Fashionable. On the runway, Ella Vaday, Kitty Scott-Claus and Krystal Versace receive positive critiques, with Kitty Scott-Claus winning the challenge. Scarlett Harlett and Vanity Milan receive negative critiques, and are announced as the bottom two. They lip-sync to "Scandalous" by Mis-Teeq. Vanity Milan wins the lip-sync and Scarlett Harlett sashays away.: Guest Judge: Alesha Dixon; Alternating Judge: Alan Carr; Main Challenge: The Miss Fugly Beauty Pageant; Runway Themes: Fugly Swimwear, Charity Shop Chic and Fugly But Fashionable; Challenge Winner: Kitty Scott-Claus; Bottom Two: Scarlett Harlett and Vanity Milan; Lip-Sync Song: "Scandalous" by Mis-Teeq; Eliminated: Scarlett Harlett; Farewell Message: "My one single talent got me to the TOP 5... Maybe now you'll get a word in Edgeways!! Love you all Scarlett♡"
26	8	"Bra Wars"	11 November 2021
For this week's main challenge, the queens overact in the budget movie "Bra Wars - The Fempire Claps Back".: Ella Vaday plays Daft Shader; Kitty Scott-Claus plays Brabarella; Krystal Versace plays She-3PHO; Vanity Milan plays Baby Yolo; On the runway, category is Scene Stealers. Ella Vaday, Kitty Scott-Claus, Krystal Versace and Vanity Milan receive positive critiques, with Ella Vaday and Kitty Scott-Claus being announced as the top two queens of the week, and will lip-sync for the win. They lip-sync to "Something New" by Girls Aloud. After the lip-sync, Ella Vaday and Kitty Scott-Claus are both announced winners of the challenge.: Guest Judge: Russell Tovey; Alternating Judge: Graham Norton; Main Challenge: Overact in the budget movie "Bra Wars - The Fempire Claps Back"; Runway Theme: Scene Stealers; Top Two Ella Vaday and Kitty Scott-Claus; Lip-Sync Song: "Something New" by Girls Aloud; Challenge Winners: Ella Vaday and Kitty Scott-Claus; Eliminated: None
27	9	"The Pearly Gates Roast"	18 November 2021
For this week's main challenge, the queens perform a roast of the judges and the eliminated queens of Series 3. On the runway, category is Oh My Goddess. Ella Vaday and Kitty Scott-Claus receive positive critiques, with Ella Vaday winning the challenge. Krystal Versace and Vanity Milan receive negative critiques, and are announced as the bottom two. They lip-sync to "Hallucinate" by Dua Lipa. Krystal Versace wins the lip-sync and Vanity Milan sashays away.: Guest Judge: Kathy Burke; Alternating Judge: Alan Carr; Main Challenge: Perform a roast of the judges and the eliminated queens of Series 3; Runway Theme: Oh My Goddess; Challenge Winner: Ella Vaday; Bottom Two: Krystal Versace and Vanity Milan; Lip-Sync Song: "Hallucinate" by Dua Lipa; Eliminated: Vanity Milan; Farewell Message: "I came I saw I conquered! Vanity"
28	10	"Grand Finale"	25 November 2021
For the final challenge of the season, the queens write, record and perform their own verse to RuPaul's song "Hey Sis, It's Christmas". On the runway, category is Final Three Eleganza Extravaganza. The eliminated queens all return to the runway. The three finalists are told that they will be lip-syncing to "You Don't Own Me" by Dusty Springfield. It is announced that Krystal Versace is the winner, leaving Ella Vaday and Kitty Scott-Claus as the runners-up.: Alternating Judges: Alan Carr and Graham Norton; Main Challenge: Write, record and perform your own verse to RuPaul's song "Hey Sis, It's Christmas"; Runway Theme: Final Three Eleganza Extravaganza; Lip-Sync Song: "You Don't Own Me" by Dusty Springfield; Runners-up: Ella Vaday and Kitty Scott-Claus; Winner of RuPaul's Drag Race UK Series Three: Krystal Versace
