= Myra DuBois =

British performer

- Born: Gareth Joyner
- Occupation: Stand-up comedian
- Television: Britain's Got Talent (Series 14)

Myra DuBois is a stage persona portrayed by Gareth Joyner, a stand-up comedian and drag performer from Rotherham based in London.

== Early life ==
Gareth Joyner began performing as Myra DuBois in burlesque clubs and gay bars after moving to London in 2008.

When interviewed in character as Myra DuBois, the performer has described having a "past life as a bingo caller".

== Career ==
In 2020, DuBois was a semi-finalist on Britain's Got Talent. When his audition first aired, Boy George remarked on Twitter "Love the hilarious drag queen", while Piers Morgan described his performance as "diabolical".

DuBois has been a guest on The John Bishop Show, a panellist on Big Brother’s Bit on the Side, appeared on Dom Jolly’s Fool Britannia, and in 2023 was a contestant on Richard Osman's House of Games. He made a guest appearance in the film adaptation of Everybody's Talking About Jamie. In 2021, DuBois played Lady Von Fistenberg in the "Dragatha Christie murder-mystery" play Death Drop along with starring in his solo performance Dead Funny at the Edinburgh Festival Fringe.

== Filmography ==
=== Film ===
Year	Title	Role	Notes
2021	Everybody's Talking About Jamie	Herself	A drag queen at Legs Eleven and a friend of Hugo Battersby / Loco Chanelle

=== Television ===
Year	Title	Role	Notes
2023	The Weakest Link	Herself	Contestant
2023	Richard Osman's House of Games	Herself	Contestant; Series 7 Week 4
2022	Queens for the Night	Mentor	One-off special
2020	Britain's Got Talent	Herself	Contestant; Series 14
2015	The John Bishop Show	Herself	

=== Theatre ===
Year	Title	Role	Notes
2021–2022	Sleeping Beauty	Carabosse	
2021	Death Drop	Lady von Fistenburg	
2021	Dead Funny	Herself	
2023-2024	Jack and the Beanstalk	Myra Blunderbore	
2024-2025	Cinderella	Wicked Stepmother	
2025-2026	Snow White	Queen Lucretia	at the Alhambra
2026	Titanique	Mother Ruth	at the Criterion Theatre
