= Victoria Scone =

British drag performer

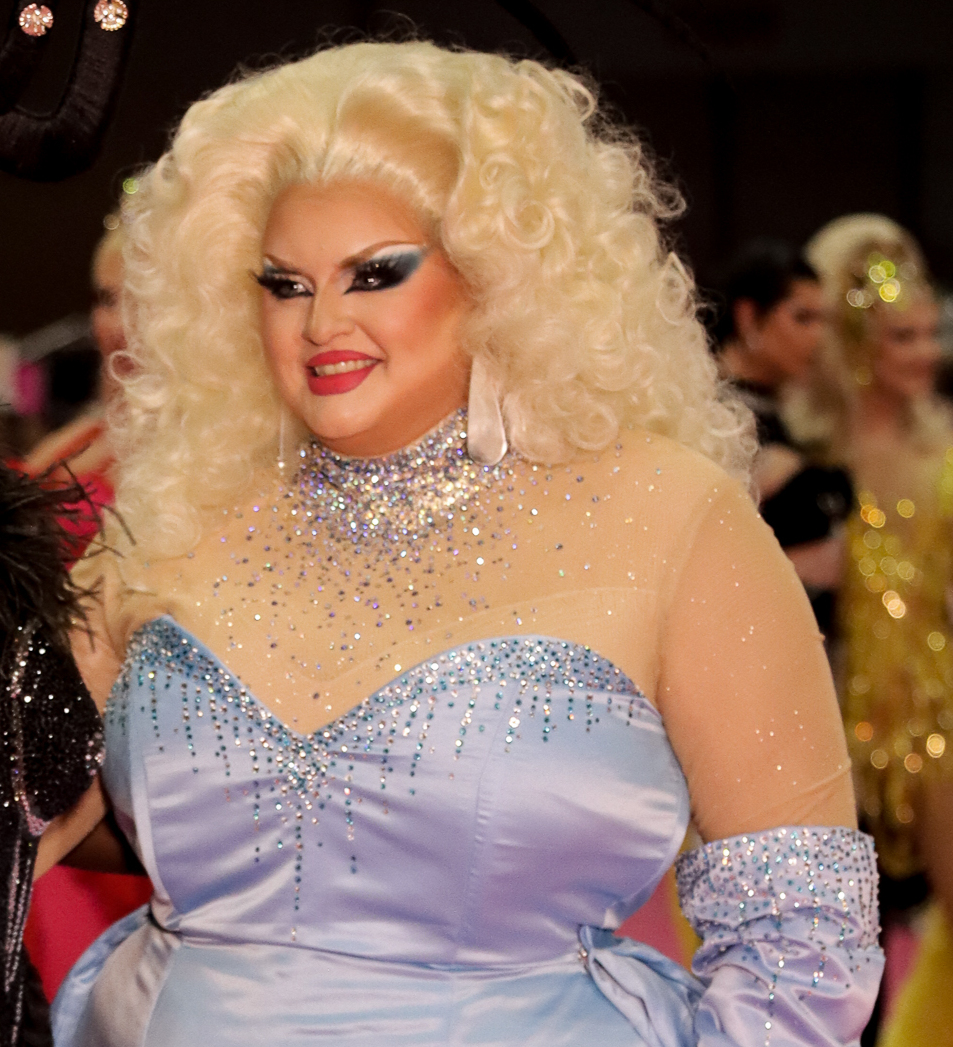
- Victoria Scone at RuPaul's DragCon LA, 2023
- Born: 6 April 1993 (age 33); Portsmouth, England, UK
- Occupation: Drag queen
- Television: RuPaul's Drag Race UK (series 3); Canada's Drag Race: Canada vs. the World (season 1)

Victoria Scone (born 6 April 1993) is a British drag queen and cabaret performer based in Cardiff, Wales. They are best known for competing on the third series of RuPaul's Drag Race UK in 2021, where they were the first cisgender female contestant on any series of the Drag Race franchise. They returned to compete in the first season of Canada's Drag Race: Canada vs. the World in 2022.

== Career ==
Victoria is a professionally trained actor, singer and dancer. Prior to becoming a full-time drag performer, Scone worked as a sales and events coordinator. They chose the stage name Victoria Scone because they wanted "something very British." "I wanted something edible, being a curvaceous woman as I am. It's also a pun as in 'Where's Victoria? Victoria's gone!'"

Victoria Scone competed in the third series RuPaul's Drag Race UK, they were the first cisgender female competitor on any season of the Drag Race franchise. They had been doing drag for approximately three years when they competed on the show. They placed in the top 2 in the first episode, however they withdrew from the show on the third episode after partially tearing their anterior cruciate ligament during their top 2 lip sync for the win with Krystal Versace.

Victoria Scone later returned to compete on the first season of Canada's Drag Race: Canada vs. the World against former contestants from across the Drag Race franchise. During their time in the competition, they placed in the Top 2 three times and was never up for elimination, making it to the finale. They later lost their lip-sync against season winner Ra'Jah O'Hara in the first round of the finale Lip-Sync for the Crown tournament, ultimately tying for third place with fellow competitor Rita Baga.

== Personal life ==
Victoria is based in Cardiff. On Drag Race UK, they discussed a previous struggle with bulimia nervosa. They are non-binary lesbian who uses they/them pronouns both in and out of drag.

During the airing of the finale of Canada vs. the World in December 2022, Scone proposed to their girlfriend, Dani; however, they revealed three months later, in March 2023, that the two have since separated.

== Filmography ==
Year	Title	Genre	Role	Notes
2021	RuPaul's Drag Race UK	TV	Contestant (10th Place)	Series 3; 5 episodes
2022	Canada's Drag Race: Canada vs. the World	TV	Contestant (3rd/4th Place)	Season 1; 6 episodes
2023	Glow Up: Britain's Next Make-Up Star	TV	Guest	Series 5: Episode 6

=== Web series ===
Year	Title	Role	Notes	Ref
2021	Meet the Queens	Themself	Stand-alone special RuPaul’s Drag Race UK Series 3	
2021	Tea Time	Themself	Guest	
2021	Bootleg Opinions	Themself	Guest	
2021	Hansh	Themself	Guest	
2021	The Mirror	Themself	Guest; with Veronica Green	
2021	Drag Us Weekly	Themself	Guest; with Veronica Green	
2021	Coming Out Chats	Themself	Guest; with Lawrence Chaney	
2021	PopBuzz Meets	Themself	Guest	
2021	The Fingerdoo Review	Themself	Guest	
2022	Exactly. with Florence Given	Themself	Guest; Podcast	
2022	Meet the Queens	Themself	Stand-alone special Canada's Drag Race: Canada vs The World	

- Bring Back My Girls (2024)

== Discography ==
=== Singles ===
==== As lead artist ====
Title	Year	Album
"Get Ready to Go"	2022	Non-album singles

==== As featured artist ====
Title	Year	Album
"Bonjour, Hi!" (Touché Version) (The cast of Canada's Drag Race: Canada vs The World)	2022	Non-album singles

== Awards and nominations ==
Year	Award-giving body	Category	Work	Results	Ref.
2023	Queerty Awards	Drag Royalty	Themself	Nominated	
