= The Bi Life =

2018 British reality television series

- Genre: Reality, Dating
- Starring: Courtney Act
- Country of origin: United Kingdom
- Original language: English
- No. of series: 1
- No. of episodes: 10

Production
- Executive producer: Ros Coward
- Running time: 50 minutes
- Production company: Monkey Kingdom

Original release
- Network: E!
- Release: 25 October – 27 December 2018

The Bi Life is a British dating reality programme. It features bisexual people exploring the dating scene of Barcelona while receiving dating advice and support from each other and host Courtney Act. The show has been noted in media for promoting bisexual visibility.

== Cast ==
The series' main cast was revealed on 9 October 2018, two weeks before the first episode was broadcast.

Name	Age	Hometown
Carmen Clarke	21	Manchester
Daisie Thilwind	26	Manchester
Irene Ellis	23	London
Kyle McGovern	23	South Wales
Leonnie Cavill	27	Manchester
Mariella Amodeo	33	London
Matt Brindley	27	Chester
Michael Gunning	24	Manchester
Ryan Cleary	27	London

== Episodes ==
All episodes were originally broadcast on E! in the UK and Ireland, starting from 25 October 2018, before being uploaded to YouTube and hayu.

No. in series	Title	Original release date
1	"Episode 1"	25 October 2018
A group of sexy singles jet off to Barcelona to find love. The Bi Life cast meet each other for the very first time and settle into their Spanish villa, ready for a long, hot summer of dating ahead of them.
2	"Episode 2"	1 November 2018
The sexy singles continue their quest to find love. Breaking the norms of the dating shows which have come before it; this sexy new series will chart the cast's highs and lows as they embark on this ultimate life-changing journey of self-discovery.

== Viewership ==
Weekly ratings for each show on E!. All ratings are provided by BARB.

Episode	Date		Official rating on E! (UK)	Weekly rank for E! (UK)
Episode	in UK	in Australia	Official rating on E! (UK)	Weekly rank for E! (UK)
Episode 1	25 October	30 October	65,300	2
Episode 2	1 November	6 November	TBA	TBA
Episode 3	8 November	13 November	TBA	TBA
