= Ella Vaday =

British drag performer, actor and dancer

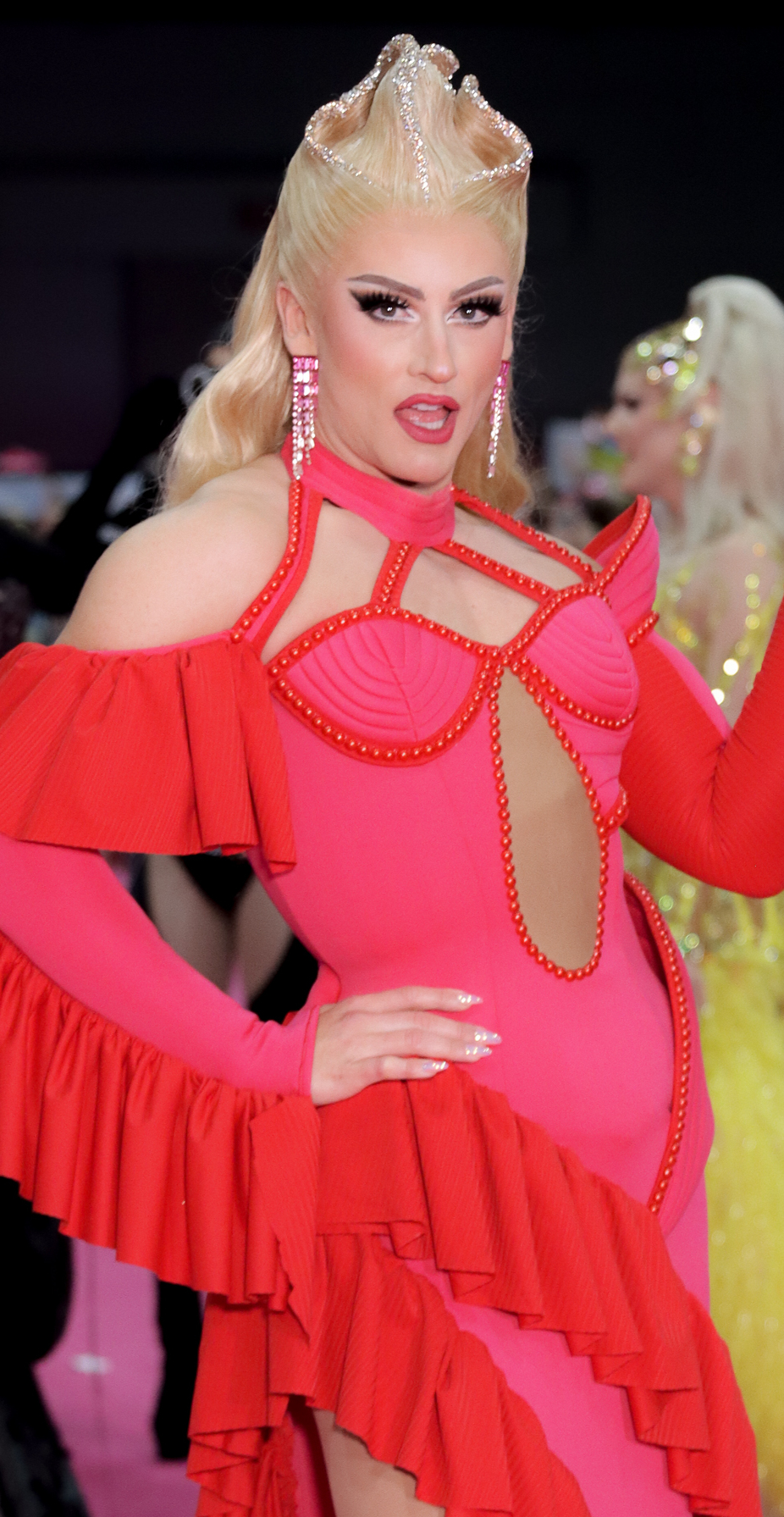
- Ella Vaday at RuPaul's DragCon LA, 2023
- Born: Nick Collier; 23 September 1988 (age 38); London, England, UK
- Television: RuPaul's Drag Race UK (series 3)
- Website: ellavadayofficial.com

Nick Collier (born 23 September 1988), better known as Ella Vaday, is an English drag queen, actor and dancer who competed on the third series of RuPaul's Drag Race UK.

== Early life and education ==
Collier was based in Dagenham, East London as a child. A fan of singing and dancing as a child, he attended Bird College, a performing arts school in Sidcup, South East London.

== Career ==
Collier first worked as a backup dancer for Olly Murs and Eoghan Quigg on The X Factor. Theatre credits include Book of Mormon, Cats, Fame, Joseph and the Amazing Technicolour Dreamcoat, Peter Pan, and Wicked. He has also operated a dog walking business. Collier competed under his drag name, Ella Vaday, on the third series of RuPaul's Drag Race UK. He impersonated Nigella Lawson during the Snatch Game challenge. Conor Clark of Gay Times called the impersonation "iconic". Collier was one of the three finalists, competing against Krystal Versace and Kitty Scott-Claus in the final lip-sync to "You Don’t Own Me" by Dusty Springfield.

Collier also appeared as Ella Vaday in Sumotherhood, the feature film follow-up for Adam Deacon, released in November 2023.

== Personal life ==
During the COVID-19 pandemic, Ella Vaday's social media following increased from 6,000 to 30,000 followers.

== Discography ==
=== Singles ===
==== As featured artist ====
- Tainted Love (LEONTAS feat. Ella Vaday) (2020)

== Filmography ==
=== Television ===
- RuPaul's Drag Race UK (2021)
- Bring Back My Girls (2024)

== Awards and nominations ==
Year	Award-giving body	Category	Work	Results	Ref.
2022	The Queerties	Future All-Star	Herself	Nominated	
