= Rub Me Wrong =

2004 single by Courtney Act

Single by Courtney Act
- B-side: "You Shook Me All Night Long"
- Released: 8 March 2004
- Length: 3:39
- Label: BMG Australia
- Songwriters: Adam Anders; David Norland
- Producers: Adam Anders; David Norland

Courtney Act singles chronology
"Rub Me Wrong" (2004)	"Welcome to Disgraceland" (2010)

"Rub Me Wrong" is a song by Australian drag queen and singer Courtney Act, released on 8 March 2004 as her debut single, shortly after her appearance on season one of Australian Idol. The song peaked at number 29 on the Australian ARIA Singles Chart.

== Track listings ==
Australian CD single
No.	Title	Length
1.	"Rub Me Wrong"	3:49
2.	"Rub Me Wrong" (Wayne G Heaven Anthem radio edit)	3:11
3.	"You Shook Me All Night Long"	2:46

== Charts ==
Chart (2004)	Peak position
Australia (ARIA)	29
