= Vanity Milan =

British drag performer

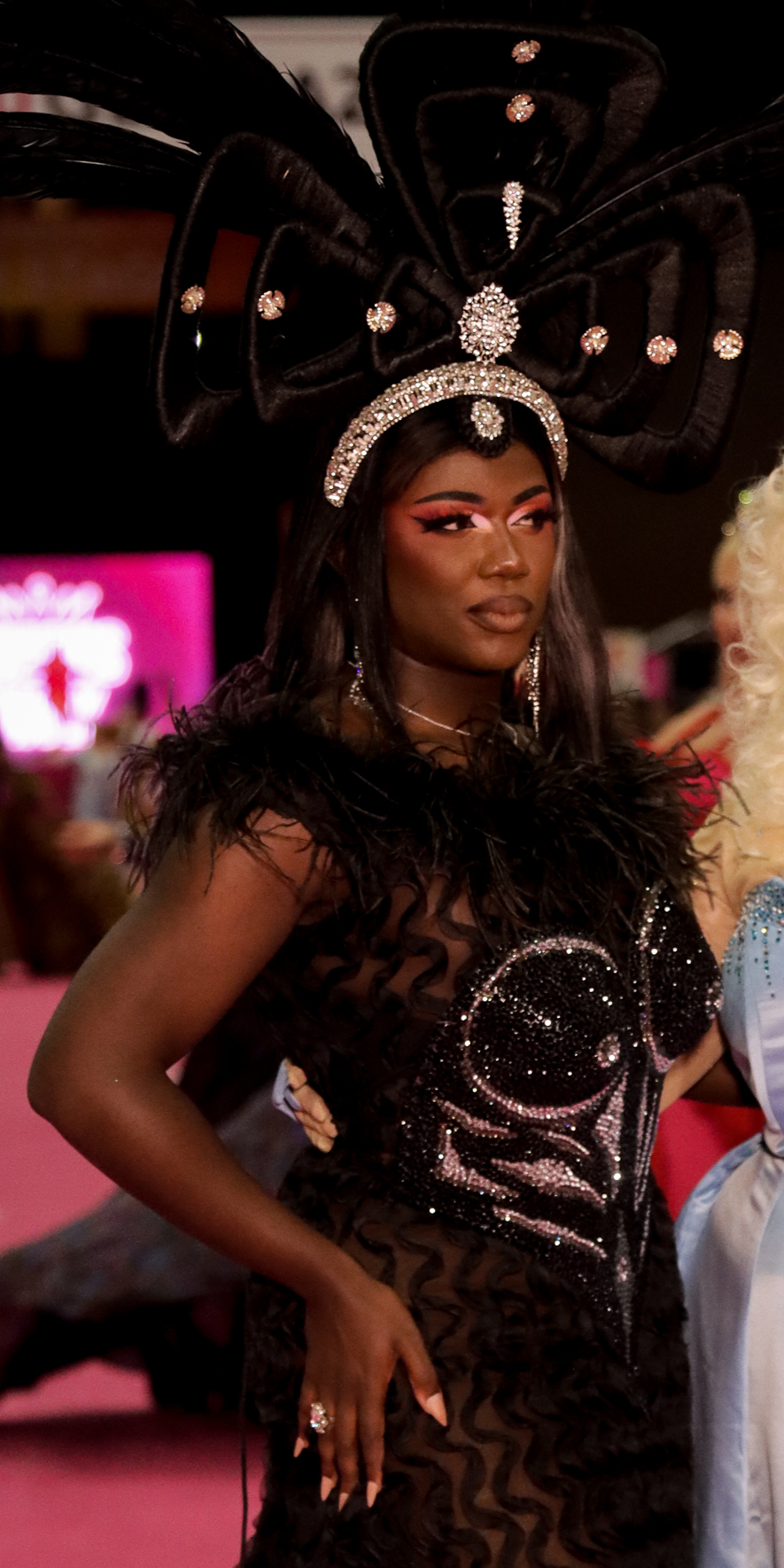
- Vanity Milan at RuPaul's DragCon LA, 2023
- Born: Christopher Alexander Adamson; 22 October 1991 (age 34); London, United Kingdom
- Occupation: Drag queen
- Television: RuPaul's Drag Race UK (series 3); Canada's Drag Race: Canada vs. the World (season 1)
- Website: vanitymilan.com

Christopher Alexander Adamson (born 22 October 1991), better known by his stage name Vanity Milan, is a British drag queen best known for competing on the third series of RuPaul's Drag Race UK. He competed in the first season of Canada's Drag Race: Canada vs. the World in 2022.

== Early life ==
Adamson was born in London. He is British Jamaican and grew up in Mitcham, South London.

== Career ==
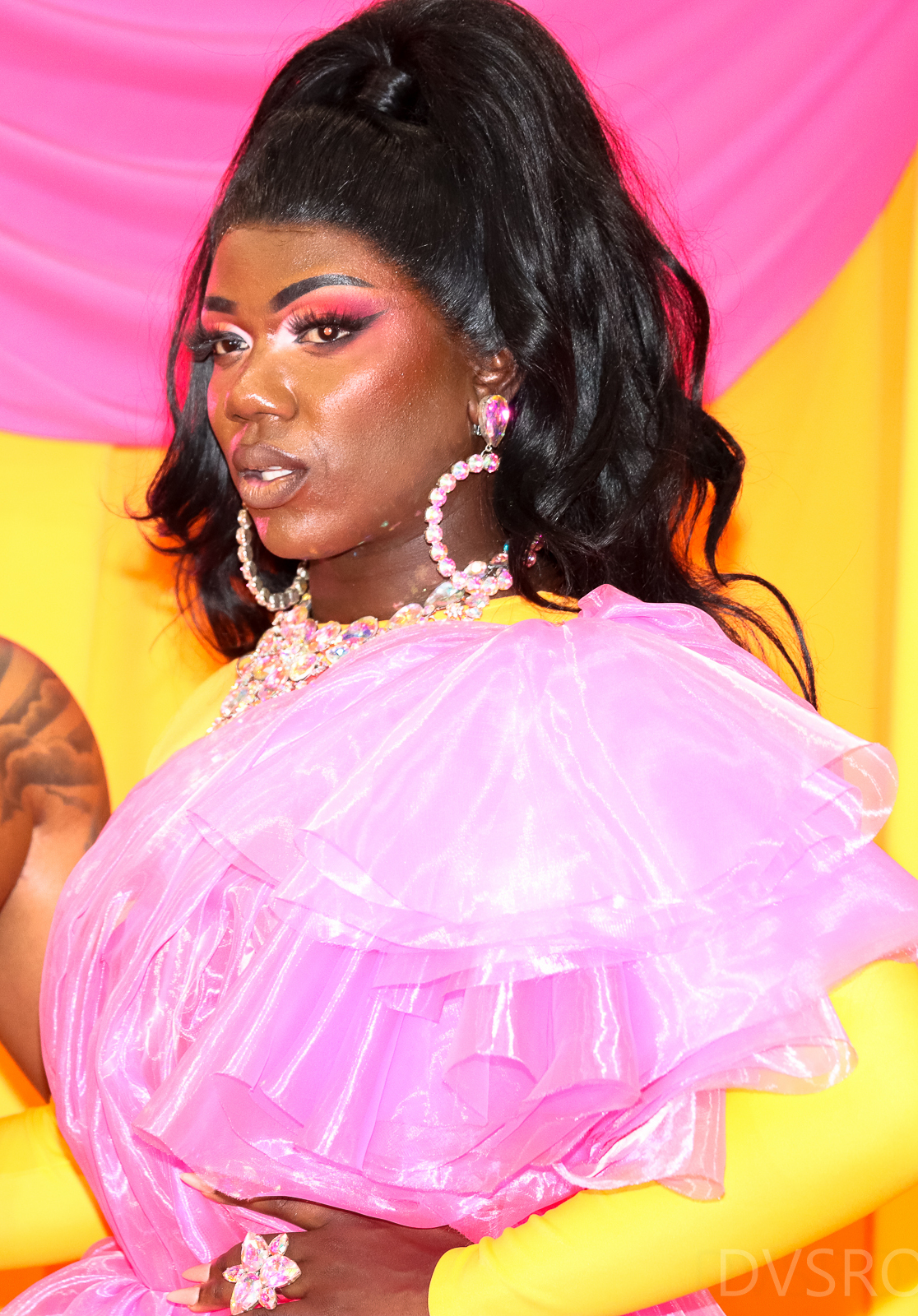
Vanity Milan at RuPaul's DragCon LA in 2023

Adamson started doing drag in London in 2019. That year, he won a competition called "The Crown" hosted by Kitty Scott-Claus. His drag name comes from his mother calling him vain and his love of fashion. His husband makes his costumes.

In 2021, Vanity Milan competed on series three of RuPaul's Drag Race UK. While on the show, Vanity Milan recorded the song "BDE," for which she won a challenge. She also won three lip syncs, tying with Series 2 contestant Tayce for the most lip syncs won on RuPaul's Drag Race UK. Vanity Milan was eliminated in the ninth episode of the series, finishing in fourth place. Since the show, Vanity Milan has commented on the lack of diversity on RuPaul's Drag Race UK.

In 2022, Vanity Milan released her debut single "Miss Milan (Don't Play With Me)" and a second single titled "Pissed". She was also featured in the music video for Cheryl Hole's debut single "Need the Power". In 2023, she released a single titled "Four Ways." Her first EP, Libra, was released in 2024.

In June 2022, Vanity Milan was featured alongside Kitty Scott-Claus on an episode of Pointless Celebrities.

In October 2022, Vanity Milan was announced as a contestant on the first season of Canada's Drag Race: Canada vs. the World. While on the show, she recorded the song "Bonjour, Hi," for which she won the first challenge and lip sync to "Brand New Bitch" by Anjulie. Vanity Milan was eliminated in the fifth episode of the series, placing fifth overall.

== Personal life ==
Adamson identities as queer.

In 2011, Adamson moved to Estonia, where he lived for five years. While there, he met his husband Siim Adamson, who is an Estonian citizen.

== Discography ==
=== Extended play ===
Title	Details
Libra	Released: February 2, 2024; Label: Moonchild; Format: Digital download, streaming

=== Singles ===
Title	Year	Album
"Miss Milan (Don't Play with Me)"	2022	non-album singles
"Pissed"	2022	non-album singles
"Four Ways"	2023	non-album singles
"NEW ERA"	2025	non-album singles

=== Featured singles ===
Title	Year	Album
"B.D.E. (Big Drag Energy)" (with the cast of RuPaul's Drag Race UK, series 3)	2021	non-album single
"Bonjour, Hi!" (SRV Version) (with the cast of Canada's Drag Race: Canada vs. the World, season 1)	2022	non-album single

== Filmography ==
Television
Year	Title	Role	Notes
2021	RuPaul's Drag Race UK	Contestant	Series 3; 10 episodes (4th place)
2022	Pointless Celebrities	Contestant	Series 15, episode 4
2022	Canada's Drag Race: Canada vs. the World	Contestant	Season 1; 6 episodes (5th place)

Web series
Year	Title	Role	Notes	Ref
2021	Meet the Queens	Herself	Stand-alone special RuPaul's Drag Race UK Series 3	
2021	Drag Us Weekly	Herself	Guest	
2021	Cosmo Queens UK	Herself	Guest	
2022	Love Against the Odds	Herself	Guest; Channel 4 digital series	
2022	Meet the Queens	Herself	Stand-alone special Canada's Drag Race: Canada vs. the World	
2024	Bring Back My Girls	Herself	Season 2, Episode 6, "RuPaul's Drag Race UK Season 3 and 4"	
