= Courtney Act =

Australian drag queen and recording artist (born 1982)

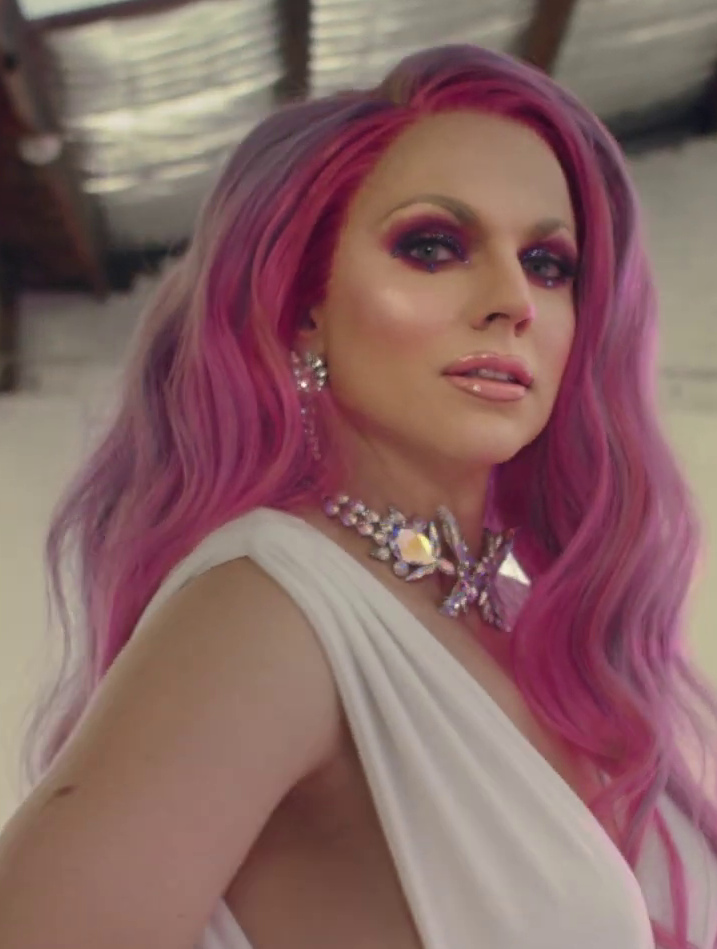
- Courtney in 2019
- Born: Shane Gilberto Jenek; 18 February 1982 (age 44); Brisbane, Queensland, Australia
- Occupations: Drag queen; television personality; singer
- Years active: 2000–present
- Musical career
- Member of: The AAA Girls
- Website: courtneyact.com

Shane Gilberto Jenek (born 18 February 1982), better known under the stage name Courtney Act, is an Australian drag queen, singer and television personality. Courtney first came to prominence competing on the first season of Australian Idol in 2003. After the show, she signed to BMG Australia (now Sony Music Australia), and she released her debut single, "Rub Me Wrong", which peaked at No. 29 on the ARIA Singles Chart and was certified Gold. While auditioning for Australian Idol, she became the first "openly queer and gender diverse contestant" to openly appear on the show. In 2014, Courtney was one of the runners-up in season six of RuPaul's Drag Race. Courtney is a member of the drag girl-group, The AAA Girls.

In 2014, Courtney released the extended play Kaleidoscope (2015); the title-track was the official song for the 2016 Sydney Gay and Lesbian Mardi Gras. In January 2018, Courtney appeared on season 21 of Celebrity Big Brother UK and ultimately won the series. She began branching into a hosting career, hosting The Bi Life on E! and her own television special, The Courtney Act Show. Courtney released "Fight for Love" in late 2018 for the Eurovision – Australia Decides final; she finished in fourth place. In 2019, Courtney competed and was runner-up on season 16 of the Australian version of Dancing with the Stars, where she was paired with Joshua Keefe. In 2022, Act was a judge on the ITV reality competition series, Queens for the Night.

Jenek uses the pronoun she when referring to Courtney and he when referring to himself.

== Early life and education ==
Shane Gilberto Jenek was born on 18 February 1982 in Brisbane, Australia, and moved to Sydney at age 18. He was born to Gill and Annette Jenek and has an older sister named Kim. His mother is of Danish descent and his father is of German descent; they worked in Kings Cross and befriended cabaret performer and TV personality Carlotta.

Growing up, Jenek would always dress up and sing and dance, but couldn't identify with anything that was portrayed in the media. In 1987, he entered a competition, Tiny Tots, which was a charity pageant show for children, and won. At a young age, he began attending The Fame Talent School, where he became close friends with twins Lisa and Jessica Origliasso, who would later become The Veronicas. The group performed together for twelve years, performing acts such as pantomime in local shopping centres such as the Strathpine Centre, the Toombul Shopping Centre, and Westfield Chermside.

Jenek found school difficult due to bullying over his sexuality. He began to think something was wrong with him during his teenage years. He attended Nashville Primary School in Brighton, but his parents wanted him to go to a private school for his secondary studies, so he transferred to St Paul's Anglican School in Bald Hills a year early to "acclimatise". Jenek disliked the school, and moved to Sandgate District State High School after two years at St. Paul's. After school, he would frequently go clubbing with friends in Brisbane, particularly on Mary Street. Jenek received high grades at school and he was going to study medicine to become a doctor.

He first attended the Stonewall Club in the mid-90s and Jenek states that was the start of his "big queer life". While touring colleges, he visited the National Institute of Dramatic Art, and, instead of moving forward to Perth to tour the Western Australian Academy of Performing Arts, he spent a week in Sydney behind his parents' backs "living a lifetime of gay".

== Career ==
=== 2002: Beginnings and Australian Idol ===
Jenek's drag queen career began in 2002 when he met Sydney drag queen Vanity Faire. He was intrigued by the visual feminine illusion Faire would create once she was in drag and this inspired him to begin his drag career. While deciding his drag name, he originally intended to take the name "Ginger Le'Bon" and be a "redheaded, smoky voiced nightclub singer", but, instead, he decided upon the stage name Courtney Act as, in a non-rhotic accent like the Australian accent, the phrase "caught in the act" is heard. Courtney has stated that in 2002, when she began performing in drag, one had to "fight" and "earn" one's place as a drag queen. She entered the Diva Rising Star competition in 2002 and won.

In 2003, while working as a waiter at Jimmy's on the Mall, a restaurant in Brisbane, Courtney auditioned for the inaugural season of Australian Idol. He first appeared as Jenek, but the judges, Ian Dickson, Marcia Hines and Mark Holden, told Jenek that his voice was "just not up to it". The following day, Jenek returned to audition but as Courtney Act. Hines said that Courtney was "great". Dickson said, "Shane only didn't just cut it. You've added another dimension and this time you've blown us away." Courtney continued through the competition and reached the live finals. In the first TV vote Courtney did not advance; however, the judges brought her back as a wildcard. During her time on the show she performed songs such as: "I Am Woman" by Helen Reddy, "You Don't Own Me" by Lesley Gore and “You Shook Me All Night Long" by AC/DC. Courtney finished in thirteenth place on the show, but remained highly popular throughout Australia. At the time, Jenek was the first and only LGBT contestant to openly appear on a reality TV talent show.

Together with business partner and fellow drag queen Vanity Faire, Courtney operates Wigs by Vanity; they started the company in 2003, the year Courtney auditioned for idol, with the aim of producing wigs for drag queens.

=== 2003–2013: Record deal and RuPaul's Drag Race ===
A 2011 video by Courtney for the It Gets Better Project

After the completion of the first season of Australian Idol, Courtney went on tour with the finalists of the show. In 2003, Courtney signed a major record deal with BMG Australia now known as Sony Music Australia. Courtney released her debut single "Rub Me Wrong" the following year in March 2004, where the song reached a peak of number 29 on the ARIA Charts and gaining a gold certification by the charts. Courtney returned to the club scene and began working with the up-and-coming Lady Gaga.

In August 2011, Jenek moved to West Hollywood, California.

In December 2013, Logo TV announced that Courtney was among the 14 drag queens who would be competing on the sixth season of RuPaul's Drag Race. Courtney is the only queen from Australia ever to be featured on the show. Episode 4 featured Courtney as the main challenge winner. The main challenge was to perform in "Shade: The Rusical". Courtney was praised for her "strong" singing voice and acting skills. Courtney proceeded to the final in the top 3. Courtney was the fourth contestant during the show's six seasons not to have fallen into the bottom two throughout the competition. She placed as joint runner-up alongside Adore Delano, behind winner Bianca Del Rio.

=== 2014–2020 ===
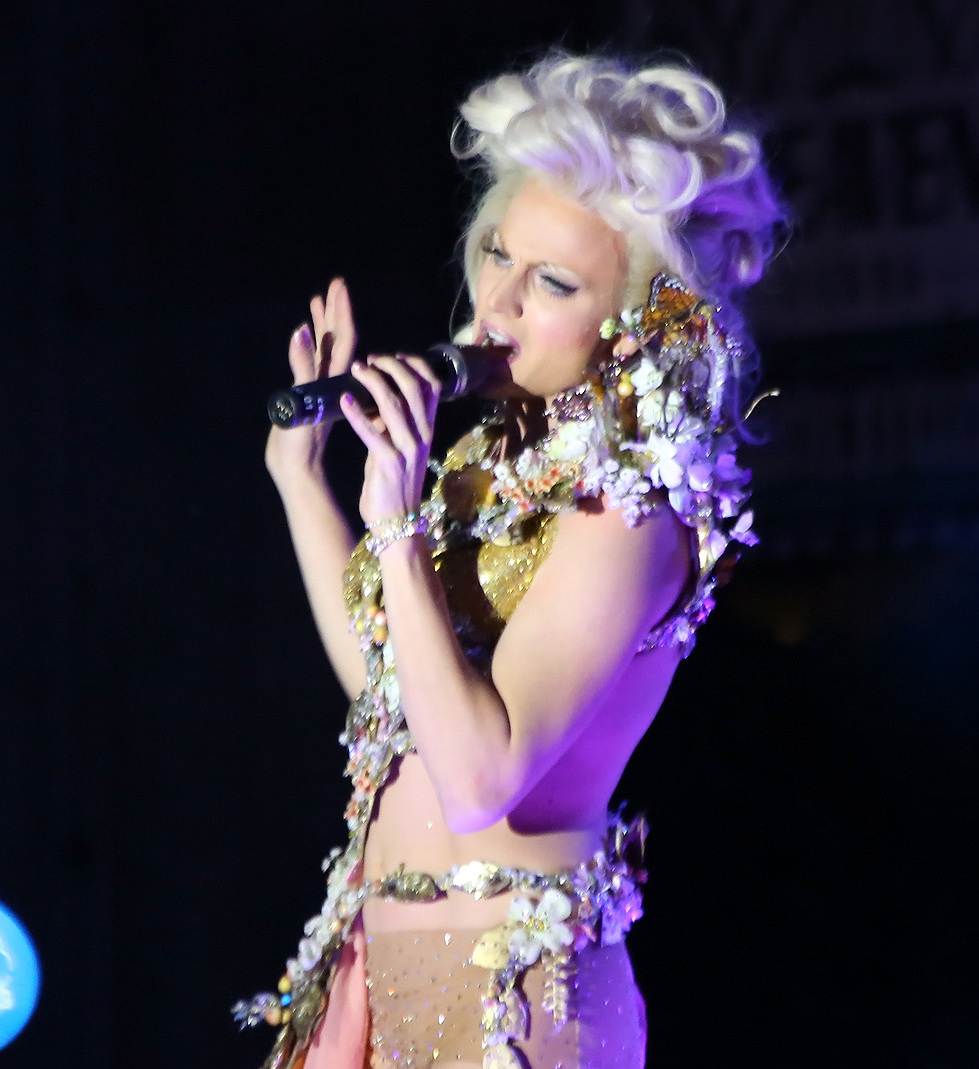
Courtney Act performing at the Life Ball in Vienna, 2014

In July 2014, Courtney became the first drag performer in history to sing live with the San Francisco Symphony Orchestra. She appeared as a guest performer with Cheyenne Jackson in "Hello, Gorgeous! Cheyenne Jackson Goes to the Movies". The two sang a duet of "Elephant Love Song" from the 2001 Baz Luhrmann film Moulin Rouge! In September 2014, Courtney, along with Willam Belli and Alaska Thunderfuck 5000, were the first drag queens to become ad girls for American Apparel, known as The AAA Girls. She worked for the campaign Support Artists, Support Ethical Manufacturing from the fashion brand. The group released their debut single "American Apparel Ad Girls". The song charted at number 10 on the Billboard Comedy Digital songs chart: the song would later feature in Belli's solo album, Shartistry in Motion (2014). In December 2014 the group released a Christmas song, "Dear Santa, Bring Me a Man", which was featured in the first Christmas Queens (2015). The album also saw Courtney cover a solo version of "Twelve Days of Christmas". Again in June 2015, the group reunited to record for Alaska's debut studio album Anus (2015), where they collaborated on the track "The Shade of It All".

In July 2015, Courtney returned to her solo recording career and created the extended play Kaleidoscope (2015). The album generally received positives from critics and it saw the release of lead single "Ecstasy". This was followed by "Ugly", "Body Parts" and the title track song "Kaleidoscope". The latter featured as the official song for the 2016 Sydney Gay and Lesbian Mardi Gras. Courtney stated: "I feel that gender and sexuality are fluid and so often we get stuck in the rigidity. Who knows when someone outside your usual target zone might come also and sweep you off your feet?”. In 2016, Courtney was the foreign correspondent for the Australian news website, Junkee. Courtney covered the US Presidential election 2016 for the site, attending rallies of both Hillary Clinton and Donald Trump. Following Trump's election, Courtney also participated in, and reported on, the 2017 Women's March.

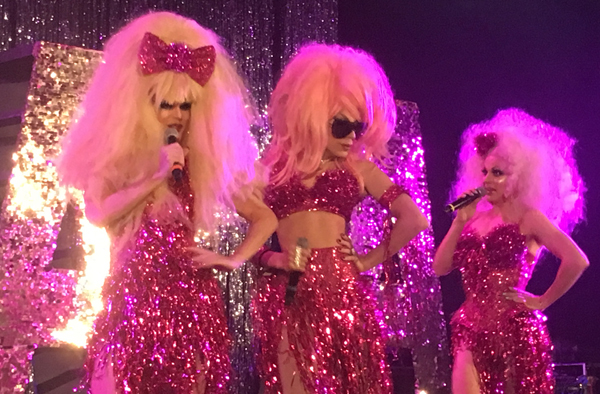
The AAA Girls performing in Denver, 2017. Courtney is seen on the right, with Willam on the left and Alaska in the middle.

In late 2017, Courtney appeared in Single AF, broadcast on MTV UK. In February 2018, Courtney was appointed one of two Fringe Ambassadors at the Adelaide Fringe, presenting the show Under the Covers there. In 2017, Courtney reunited with The AAA Girls for the Access All Areas Tour (2017). Produced by Fullscreen Live, the tour played in 15 cities in the United States and Canada. The Squared Division served as creative directors and Jae Fusz served as choreographer.

In 2018, Courtney entered the Celebrity Big Brother house, and remained in the house for 32 days, eventually winning the season, beating Ann Widdecombe. Jenek appeared as both Courtney and himself throughout the season, being referred to "him" out of drag and "her" in drag. Channel 4 confirmed The Courtney Act Show, with Courtney saying that she would be "working with some of [her] favourite artists", which was broadcast on Christmas Eve of 2018. The show featured performances from Bianca Del Rio, Adore Delano, Darienne Lake and Leona Lewis. Jenek also hosted the dating reality show The Bi Life, appearing both as Courtney Act and Shane, which premiered in Ireland and the United Kingdom on 25 October 2018 on E! Courtney competed with the song "Fight for Love" on Eurovision – Australia Decides in February 2019 to represent Australia in the Eurovision Song Contest 2019, but was not successful, losing out to Kate Miller-Heidke with the song "Zero Gravity". The show received positive reviews. In June 2019, a panel of judges from New York magazine placed her third on their list of "the most powerful drag queens in America", a ranking of 100 former Drag Race contestants.

In 2019, Courtney competed in the 16th season of the Australian version of Dancing with the Stars, partnered with Joshua Keefe, where they came second. Courtney is the first drag performer in the history of the Dancing with the Stars franchise. Courtney and Keefe topped the leader board with their performance in the first episode.

On 1 March 2019, it was announced that Courtney had filmed a guest role as herself in the Australian soap opera Neighbours. Her scenes aired in 2020. In late 2019, Courtney featured in Celebrity Come Dine with Me. Courtney appeared twice as a contestant on the quiz show Celebrity Mastermind; the British version in 2018, and the Australian version in 2020.

=== 2021–present ===
In 2021 it was announced that Courtney would become the new host of ABC Television's long-form television interview show Courtney Act's One Plus One, which was nominated for an AACTA Award. It was revealed that Network 10 had commissioned a pilot of Act's interview television series called Courtney's Closet, which transformed a different celebrity guest into drag each week while also learning about their personal journey, and premiered on video on demand streaming website 10 Play as part of its Pilot Showcase series. Act's podcast with Vanity Faire also got renewed for a second season, Brenda! Call Me. The show was world's largest LGBTQIA+ podcast, with the first season reaching 750,000 listens across 170 countries worldwide since debuting in February 2021. In June 2022, it was announced that Courtney would become a judge on new ITV reality competition show, Queens for the Night, where she would sit on the judging panel alongside Melanie C, Layton Williams, and Rob Beckett, with Lorraine Kelly as host.

On 22 August 2022, it was announced that Courtney would play the Killer Queen in all cities except for Sydney in the Australian arena tour of the We Will Rock You musical.

In 2023, Courtney competed on the fifth season of The Masked Singer Australia as Cowgirl, making her the first genderfluid contestant to compete on the show. She was unmasked on the tenth episode, after her seventh performance.

In May 2024, Courtney was the backstage correspondent for SBS's coverage of the Eurovision Song Contest 2024, held in Malmö, Sweden. Courtney reprised this position alongside Tony Armstrong for the 2025 Eurovision Song Contest in Basel, Switzerland.

== Personal life ==
Jenek is a vegan, and identifies as pansexual, genderfluid and polyamorous. In 2018, he was based in London, having previously lived in Sydney and Los Angeles. Courtney currently resides in Sydney, having purchased her first home there in 2022.

== Discography ==
=== Extended plays ===
Title	Details
Kaleidoscope	Released: 7 July 2015; Label: Courtney Act; Formats: CD, digital download
Drop of Fluid	Released: 3 July 2020; Label: Courtney Act inc.; Formats: Digital download, streaming

=== Singles ===
==== As lead artist ====
Title	Year	Peak chart positions	Album
Title	Year	AUS	Album
"Rub Me Wrong"	2004	29	Non-album singles
"Welcome to Disgraceland"	2010	—	Non-album singles
"To Russia with Love"	2014	—	Non-album singles
"Mean Gays"	2014	—	Non-album singles
"Ecstasy"	2015	—	Kaleidoscope
"Ugly"	2015	—	Kaleidoscope
"Body Parts"	2015	—	Kaleidoscope
"Kaleidoscope"	2016	—	Kaleidoscope
"Wigs by Vanity Single Jingle" (with Vanity Faire)	2016	—	Non-album singles
"Chandelier/Diamonds/Titanium (Medley)"	2016	—	Non-album singles
"Stayin' Alive"	2016	—	Non-album singles
"AAA" (with Willam and Alaska Thunderfuck)	2017	—	Non-album singles
"Fight for Love"	2018	—	Non-album singles
"Brenda! Call Me"	2021	—	Non-album singles
"Celebrate	2023	—	

==== As featured artist ====
Title	Year	Album
"Downton Abbey...Snore" (Jimmy Ray Bennett, Stephen Guarino & Jeff Hiller featuring Willam Belli, Vicky Vox & Courtney Act)	2013	Non-album singles
"Oh No She Better Don't" (RuPaul featuring Drag Race Season 6 Cast)	2014	Non-album singles
"Dance Again" (Bielfield featuring Courtney Act)	2017	Non-album singles

=== Other appearances ===
Title	Year	Album
"Champion" (RuPaul featuring Courtney Act)	2014	RuPaul Presents: The CoverGurlz
"From Head to Mistletoe"	2015	Christmas Queens
"Lucky Me" (with Bachelor Girl)	2026	Waiting for the Day: Artist Sessions

== Tours ==
Co-headlining tours

- Access All Areas Tour (2017)

== Filmography ==
=== Film ===
Year	Title	Role	Notes	Ref.
2013	Meet the Glamcocks	Herself	Documentary	
2015	Luna Goes Cruising	Koda (voice)	Shortfilm	
2015	This Is Drag	Herself	Documentary	

=== Television ===
Year	Title	Role	Notes	Ref.
2000	Snick Flicks	Herself (host)	Aired on Nickelodeon Australia for 6 months on Saturdays	
2003	Australian Idol	Herself (contestant)	Season 1 – Placed joint 13th with wildcard contenders	
2006	Australia's Next Top Model	Herself	Season 2, Episode 7: "Fashion 1.1"	
2010	Sleek Geeks	Herself	Season 2, Episode 8: "Wee Across the World"	
2012	Are You There, Chelsea?	Herself	Episode 8: "Dee Dee's Pillow"	
2012	I Will Survive	Herself	Episode 4	
2014	RuPaul's Drag Race	Herself (contestant)	Season 6 – Runner-up	
2014	RuPaul's Drag Race: Untucked!	Herself	Companion show to RuPaul's Drag Race (Season 6)	
2014	Candidly Nicole	Herself	Episode 2	
2017	Single AF	Herself (contestant)	Series 1	
2018	Celebrity Big Brother 21	Herself / himself (contestant)	Series 21 – Winner	
2018	The Bi Life	Herself / himself (host)		
2018	The Courtney Act Show	Herself (host)	Christmas special	
2019	Eurovision – Australia Decides	Herself (contestant)	4th place	
2019	Dancing with the Stars	Herself (contestant)	Season 16 – Runner-up	
2020	Neighbours	Herself	Guest role	
2020	Celebrity Karaoke Club	Herself	Contestant	
2021	Courtney Act's One Plus One	Herself (host)	Hosted long running Australian interview show	
2021	Mikki VS The World	Herself	Season 1, Episode 6: The Frosty Life	
2022	Dancing with the Stars: All Stars	Herself	Season 19 – Finalist	
2022	Eurovision Song Contest 2022	Herself	Australian jury spokesperson	
2022	Queens for the Night	Herself	Panel judge	
2023	The Masked Singer (Australian season 5)	Cowgirl/Herself	10th Unmasked / 4th Place	
2025	Claire Hooper's House Of Games	Self	5 episodes	

=== Web series ===
Year	Title	Role	Notes	Ref.
2012–13	Transfashionable	Herself	Produced by The Stylish	
2014	Reality Relapse	Herself	Produced by BiteSizeTV	
2014	Transformations	Herself	Produced by WOWPresents	
2014	Hey Qween!	Herself	Produced by Jonny McGovern	
2017	UNHhhh	Herself	Produced by WOWPresents	
2019	Jag Race	Herself	by Attitude	
2021	Brenda, Call Me	Herself	Produced by Nova Podcasts	
2022	Courtney Facts	Herself	Produced by ABC News	
2024	Very Delta	Produced by Moguls of Media		

=== Music videos ===
Title	Year	Director	Ref.
"Rub Me Wrong"	2004	Anthony Rose	
"Welcome to Disgraceland"	2010	Kain O'Keeffe	
"Oh No She Better Don't"	2014	Eve, Trina	
"To Russia with Love"	2014	Rami Mikhail	
"Mean Gays"	2014	Kain O'Keeffe	
"American Apparel Ad Girls" (with Alaska & Willam)	2014	Shawn Adeli	
"Dear Santa, Bring Me a Man" (with Alaska & Willam)	2014	Mairin Hart	
"Ecstasy"	2015	William Baker	
"Ugly"	2015	Courtney Act, Kain O'Keefe	
"Body Parts"	2015	Marvin Joseph	
"Christmas Sweater"	2015	Kain O'Keefe	
"From Head To Mistletoe"	2015	Kain O'Keefe	
"Kaleidoscope"	2016	Wallaby Way	
"Wigs by Vanity Single Jingle"	2016	—N/a	
"Stayin' Alive"	2016	—N/a	
"Chandelier / Diamonds / Titanium (Medley)"	2016	—N/a	
"AAA" (with Alaska & Willam)	2017	Kain O'Keefe	
"Illuminate" (with Our Lady J)	2017	—N/a	
"Fight For Love"	2019	Natasha Foster & Erin Fairs	

=== Music video appearances ===
Title	Year	Director	Ref.
"Applause" (Lyric video) (Lady Gaga)	2013	Lady Gaga	
"Sissy That Walk" (RuPaul)	2014	Steven Corfe	
"Jump the Gun" (Adore Delano)	2015	Josef J. Weber	
"Power" (Little Mix feat. Stormzy)	2017	Hannah Lux Davis	

Preceded by Sarah Harding	Celebrity Big Brother UK winner Series 21 (2018)	Succeeded by Ryan Thomas
