= Kaleidoscope (Courtney Act EP) =

EP by Courtney Act
- Released: 7 July 2015
- Length: 21:21
- Label: Courtney Act Inc

Courtney Act chronology
Kaleidoscope (2015)	Drop of Fluid (2020)

Kaleidoscope is a 2015 extended play (EP) by Courtney Act. According to Nylon, the EP is a "meditation on gender and the artifice that comes along with social constructions".

== Composition ==
According to Queerty's Timothy Allen, the title track "tells the story of how the traditionally separate colors of gender and sexuality are blurring into a kaleidoscope of possibilities".

== Promotion ==
The music video for "Kaleidoscope" sees Courtney Act in drag, meeting and kissing a girl. The song served as the official theme of the Sydney Gay and Lesbian Mardi Gras in 2016.

== Track listing ==
1. "Kaleidoscope" – 3:23
2. "Ecstasy" – 4:08
3. "Ugly" – 3:33
4. "Body Parts" – 3:38
5. "Like Me" – 3:22
6. "Inhale" – 3:14
