= Kitty Scott-Claus =

British drag performer

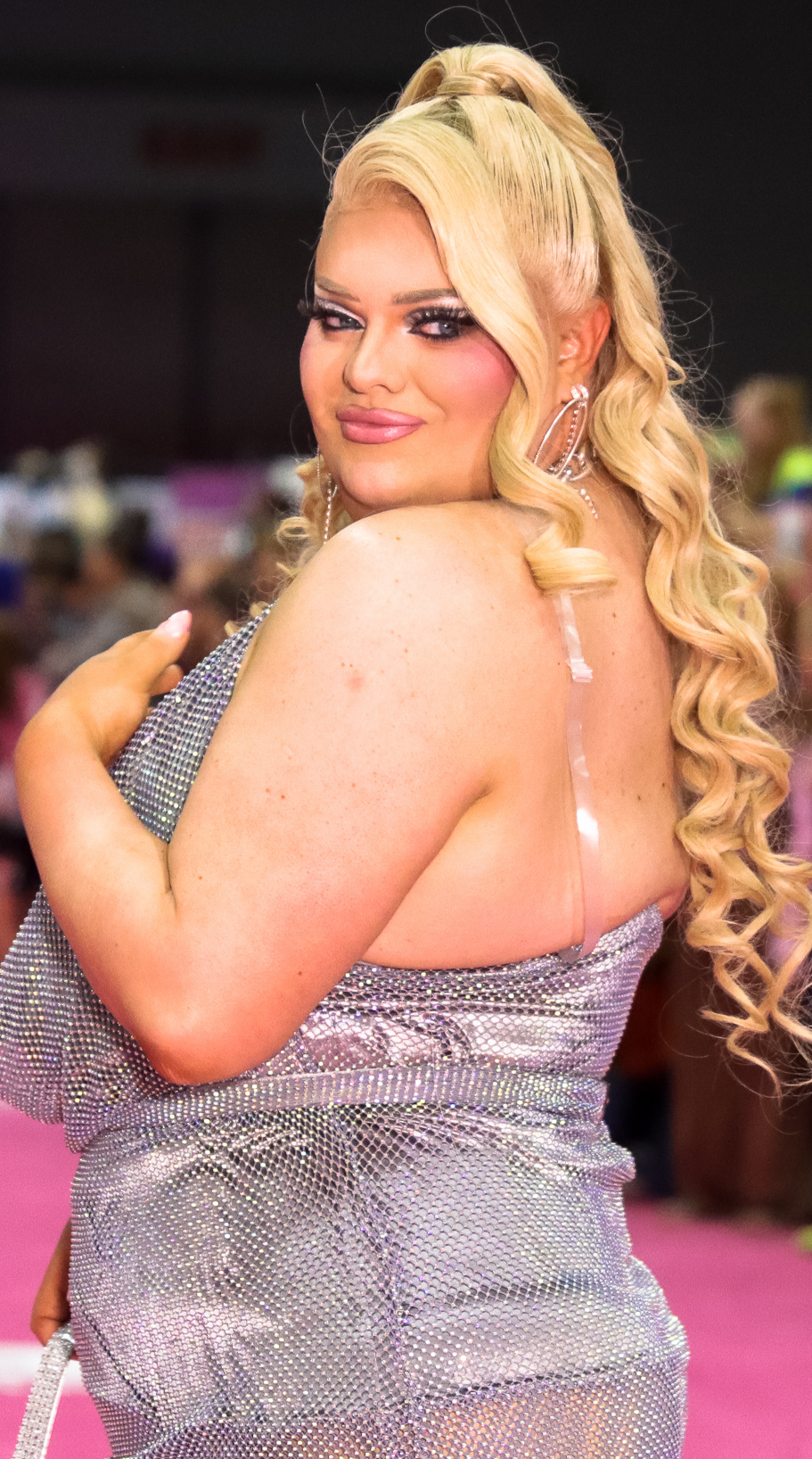
- Kitty Scott-Claus at RuPaul's DragCon LA in 2023
- Born: Louis Westwood
- Occupation: Drag performer

Louie Westwood, better known by his stage name Kitty Scott-Claus, is a British drag performer most known for competing on the third series of RuPaul's Drag Race UK and on RuPaul's Drag Race Global All Stars.

== Career ==
Kitty Scott-Claus competed on the third series of RuPaul's Drag Race UK, where she placed as a finalist. Previously, she had auditioned to compete on series 2. Kitty Scott-Claus and series 1 contestant Cheryl Hole ("drag sister") are members of the girl group Gals Aloud. Kitty won two maxi-challenges (in episodes 7 and 8), she made it to the top three without placing below safe (in the bottom 2/3). She finished as a runner-up alongside Ella Vaday.

She was a runner up on the reality show RuPaul's Drag Race Global All Stars.

== Discography ==
=== Singles ===
- Blonde (2024)

== Filmography ==
=== Television ===
Year	Title	Role	Notes	Ref(s)
2021	RuPaul's Drag Race UK	Herself	Contestant (Series 3)	
2022	Pointless Celebrities	Herself	Contestant (Series 15)	
2022	Celebrity Masterchef	Herself	Contestant (Series 17)	
2022	Queens for the Night	Herself	Mentor (One-off special)	
2022	Strictly Come Dancing: It Takes Two	Herself	Contestant (Series 20)	
2023	Strictly Come Dancing: It Takes Two	Herself	Contestant (Series 21)	
2023	The Weakest Link	Herself	Contestant (Celebrity special)	
2024	Bring Back My Girls	Herself	Guest	
2024	RuPaul's Drag Race Global All Stars	Herself	Contestant	

=== Podcast ===
Year	Title	Role	Notes	Ref(s)
2022	Love Island: Aftersun	Herself	Series 8	
2022	Saving Grace	Herself	Episode 18	

=== Theatre ===
Year	Title	Role	Theatre	Ref(s)
2022	Death Drop	Shazza	Criterion Theatre	
2023	Death Drop 2 Back in the Habit	Sister	Garrick Theatre	

== Awards and nominations ==
Year	Award-giving body	Category	Work	Results	Ref.
2022	The Queerties	Future All-Star	Herself	Nominated	
