= Stockton Globe =

Theatre and cinema in Stockton-on-Tees, England

- The Globe
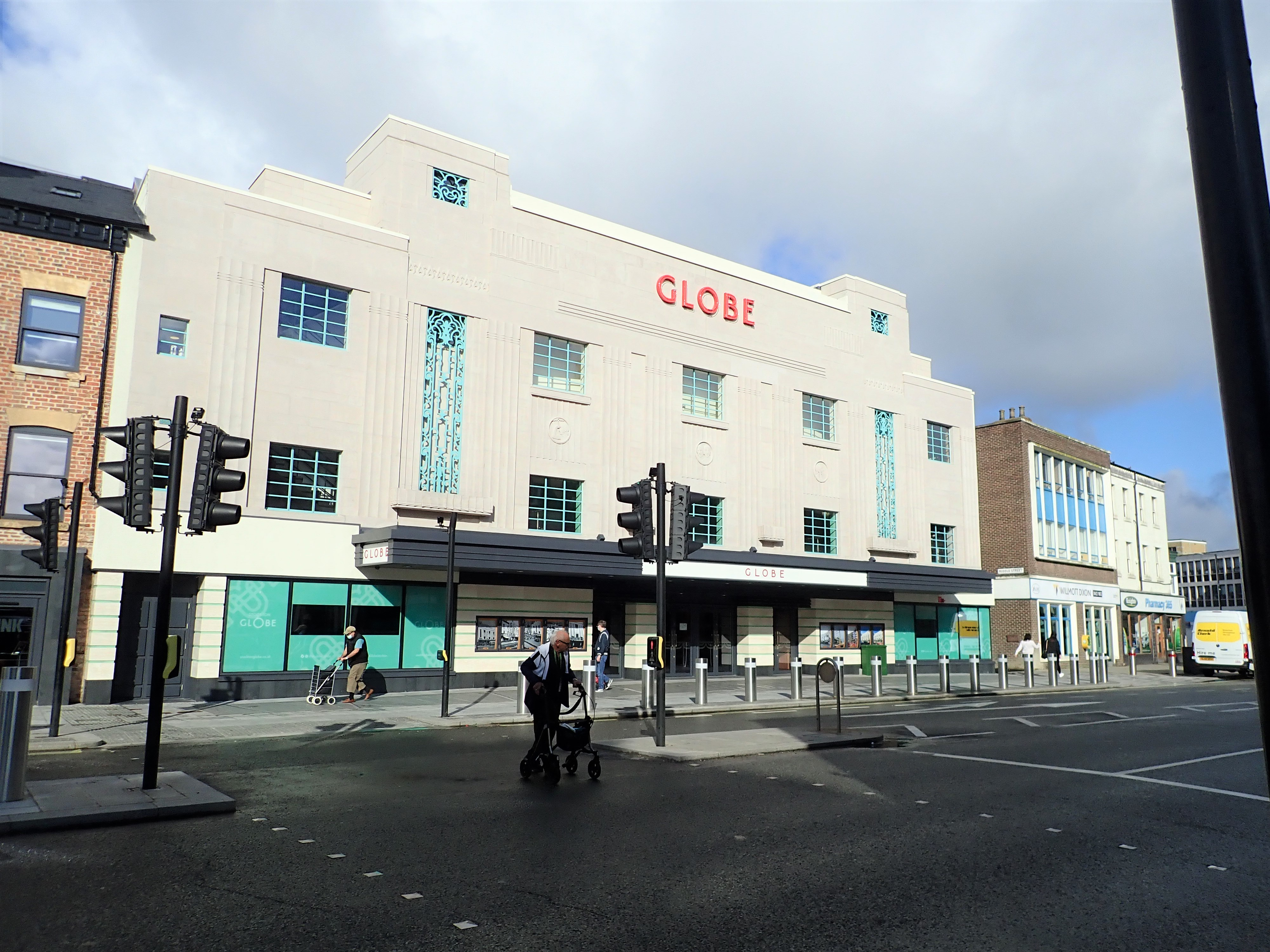
- Interactive map of Stockton Globe
- Former names: ABC Cinema
- Address: 153A High Street, Stockton-On-Tees, County Durham, TS18 1PL; England
- Coordinates: 54.56706°N 1.31324°W
- Owner: ATG Entertainment
- Operator: ATG Entertainment
- Capacity: 2,372
- Type: Theatre / Cinema / Bingo Hall
- Designation: Grade II listed

Construction
- Opened: 1913
- Closed: 1990
- Reopened: 2021

Website
- https://www.stocktonglobe.co.uk/

The Globe (formerly ABC Theatre) is a Grade II listed Art Deco theatre, in Stockton-on-Tees, England.

== History ==
Situated at the north-western end of High Street, the original Globe Theatre was built in 1913 and was the area's first purpose-built cinema. Demolished in 1925, it was first rebuilt in 1926, when it showed the area's first talkies. It was rebuilt again, still on the same site in 1935, designed as a leading variety theatre but also including cinema facilities and seating for 2,372 people. The Globe regularly hosted stage shows with national companies. In 1938, it became an ABC cinema but live performances continued including an annual pantomime, ballet and West End shows.

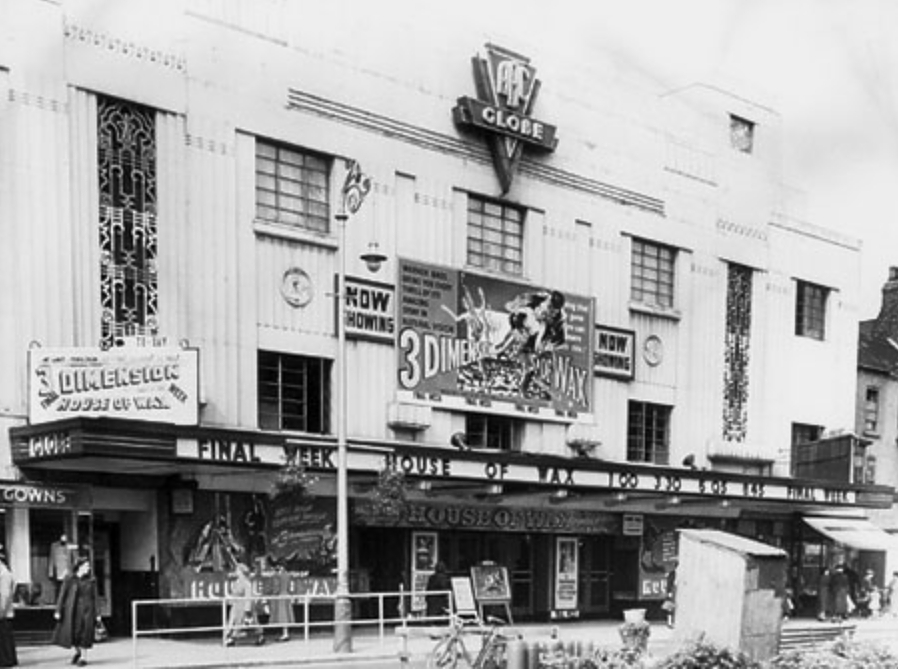
The theatre in 1953

From the 1950s to the 1970s the ABC Theatre was a premier venue hosting many famous acts, such as Buddy Holly, the Platters, Guy Mitchell, the Animals, Cilla Black, Carl Perkins and Chuck Berry. The Beatles twice played at the venue, the first time being Friday 22 November 1963, the day U.S. President John F. Kennedy was assassinated. The Rolling Stones performed at ABC Theatre multiple times, including two shows with Ike & Tina Turner and The Yardbirds in 1966.

The venue has hosted other stars, such as Cliff Richard, the Shadows and Lonnie Donegan, who made their acting debuts here in pantomime. Cliff Richard and the Shadows composed their "Stars Fell on Stockton" (B-side to "Wonderful Land") here and much of the music for the Cliff Richard film Summer Holiday whilst taking part in pantomime at the Globe. As late as the 1970s, bands such as Mud, Showaddywaddy and the Bay City Rollers played here.

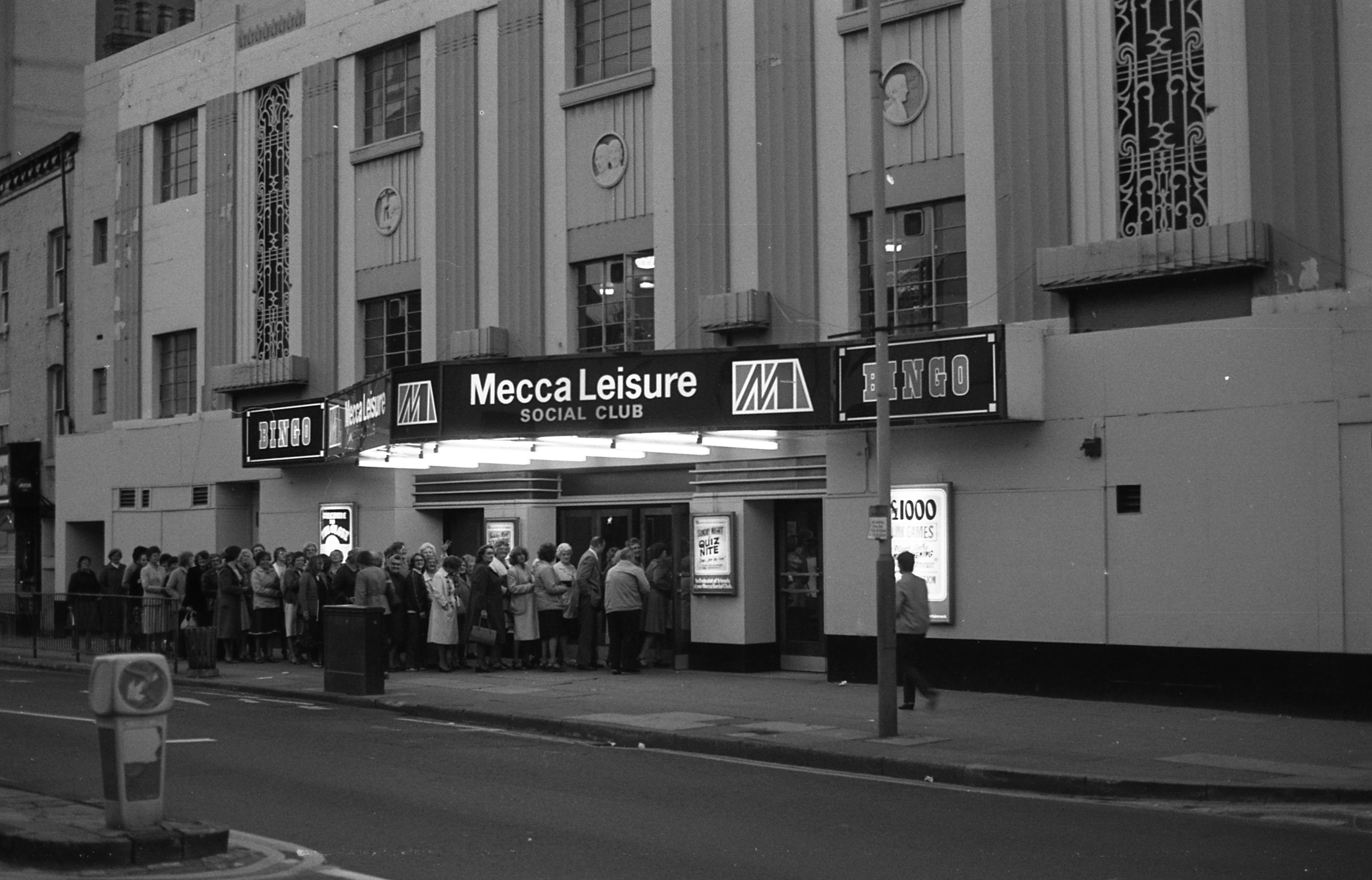
Theatre as a bingo hall in 1982

Whilst the theatre played host to these famous bands, it was also a cinema and showed the very first 3D film in the region, House of Wax in 1953. The last film was The Sting, on 15 June 1974. Status Quo were the final rock band to play there in December 1974, but the very last show was on 5 February 1975 when the London Philharmonic Orchestra staged a concert. The doors of the Globe closed only to re-open as a bingo venue for a few years until closing for good in 1997.

=== Reopening ===
Many of the original ornamental features have survived and the Theatres Trust described the Grade II-listed building as "an excellent example of its kind" and had it as one of 68 buildings on its 'at risk' register.

There had been several plans to reopen the venue in recent years, including a plan in 2002 to transform it into a nightclub, but none was realised until it was announced in 2010 that the building would be restored to its former glory at a cost of £4 million, and will reopen as venue for music, comedy and other events.

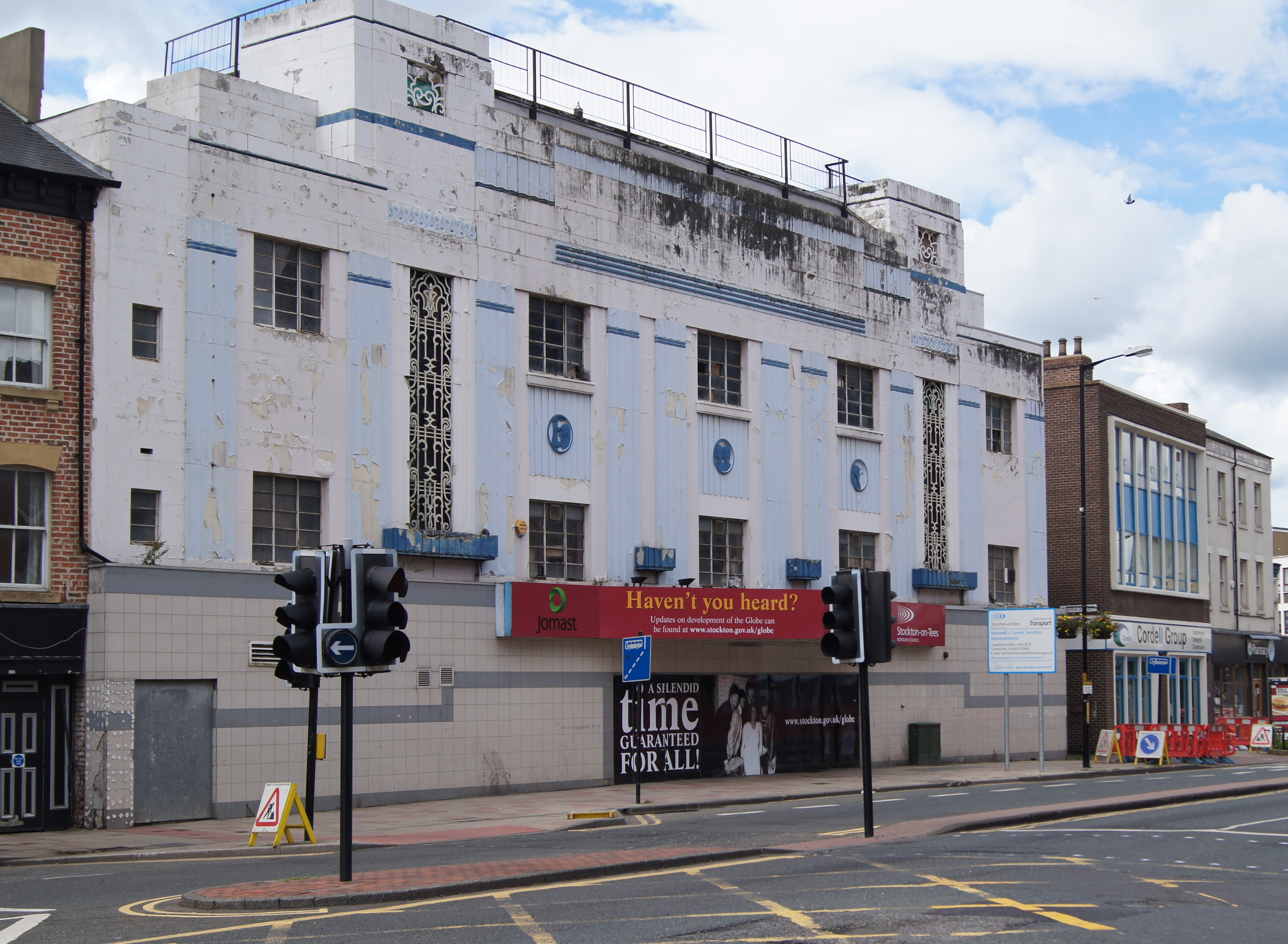
The theatre in disrepair before being refurbished

Despite multiple delays due to structural problems and the original budget ballooning to £27.9 million, the theatre reopened in 2021. Pop band McFly were the first act to perform on the Globe's stage since 1975.
