= List of RuPaul's Drag Race UK contestants =

The British television series RuPaul's Drag Race UK premiered in 2019. This is a list of the contestants who have appeared on the show.

== List of contestants ==
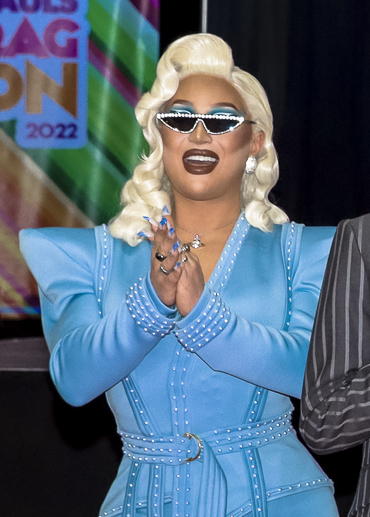
Series 1 winner
The Vivienne

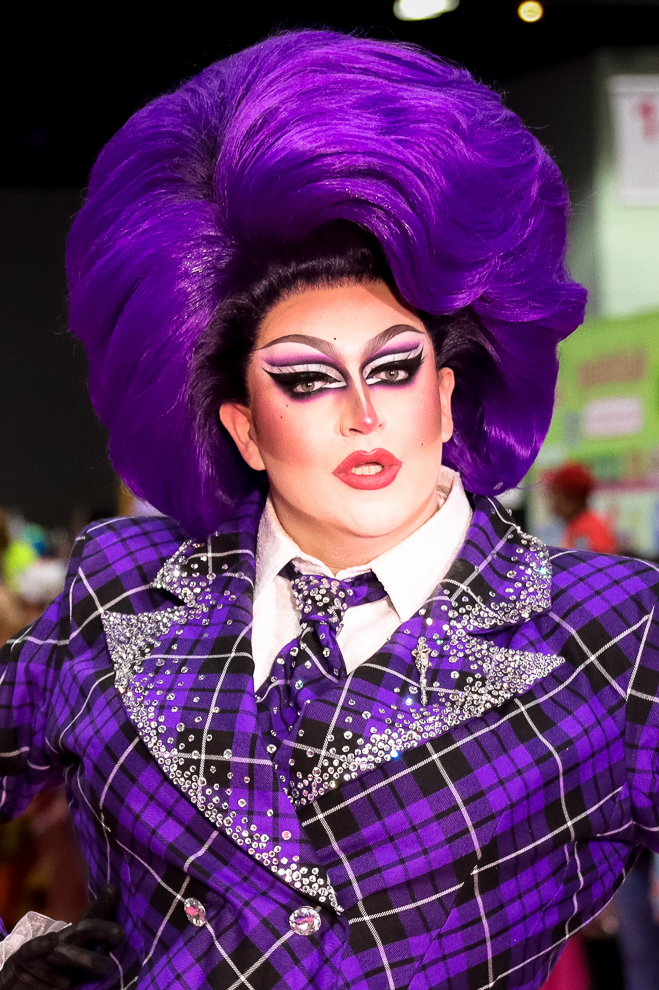
Series 2 winner
Lawrence Chaney

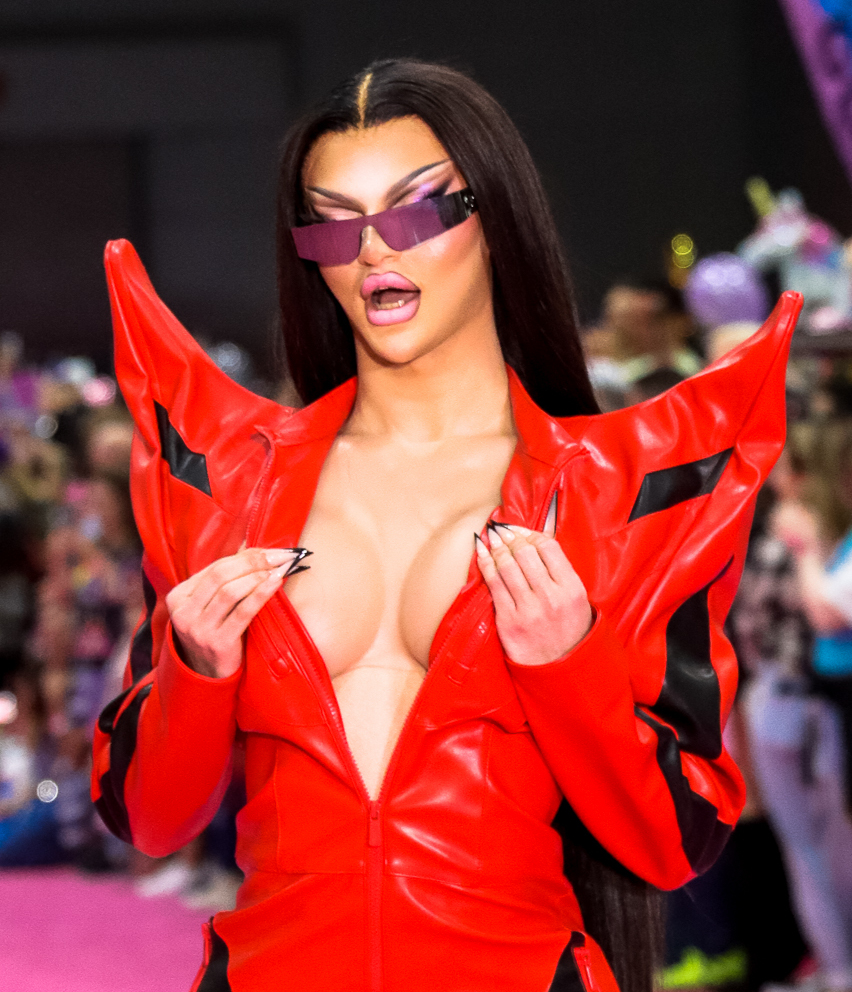
Series 3 winner
Krystal Versace

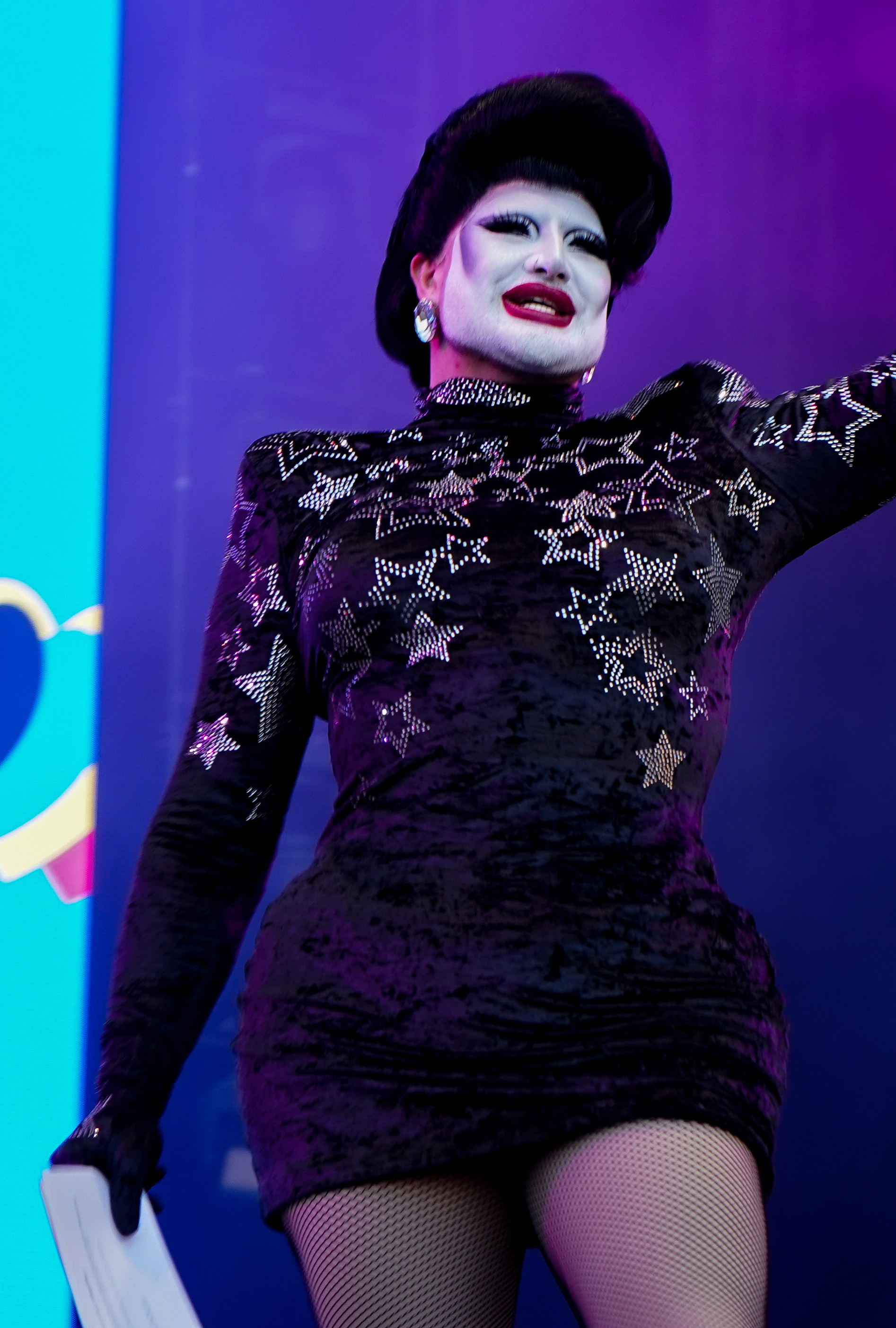
Series 4 winner
Danny Beard

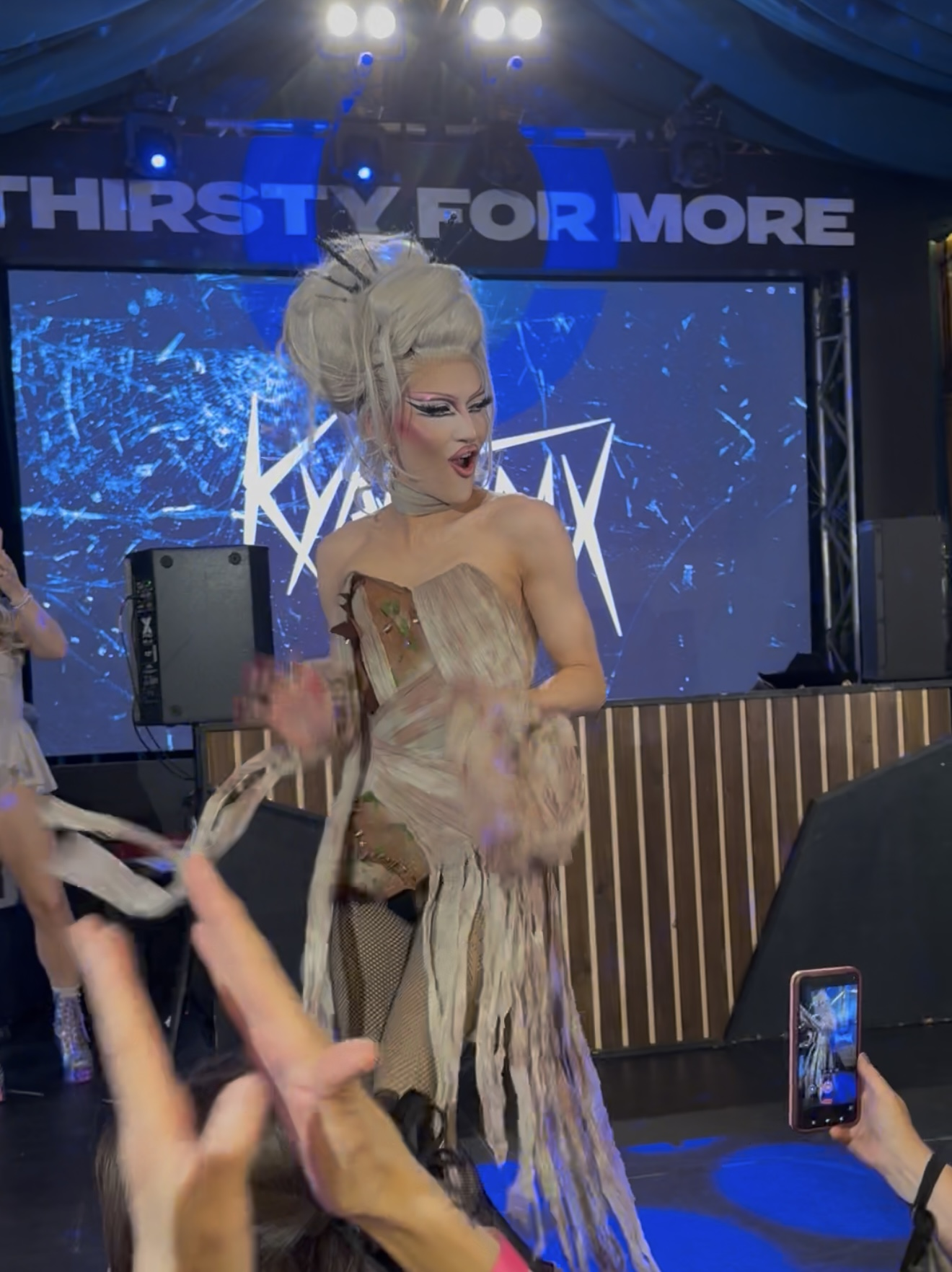
Series 6 winner
Kyran Thrax

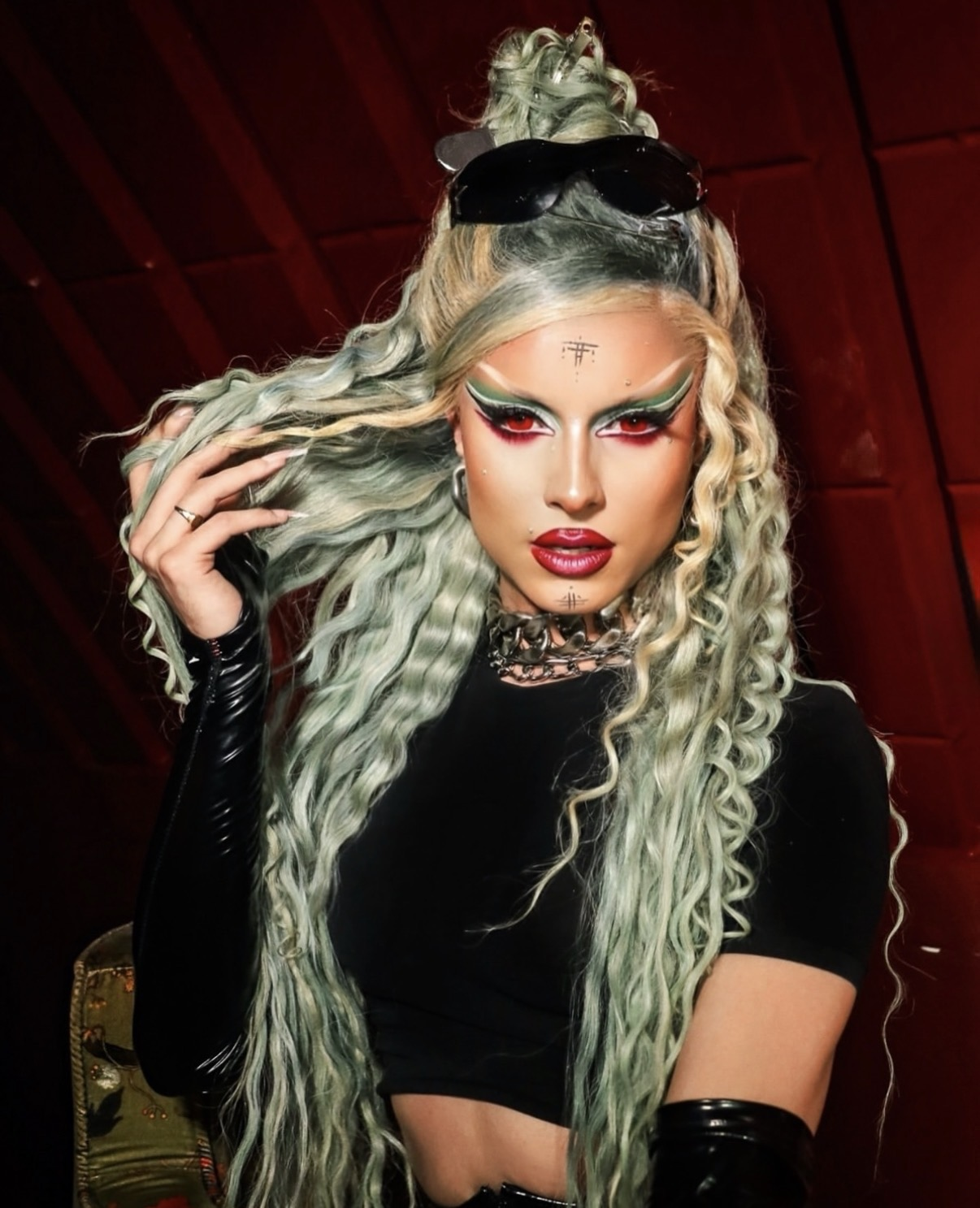
Series 7 winner
Bones

Contestants of RuPaul's Drag Race UK and their backgrounds
Series	Contestant	Age	Hometown	Outcome
1	The Vivienne†	26	Liverpool, England	Winner
1	Divina de Campo	35	Brighouse, England	Runner-up
1	Baga Chipz	29	East London, England	3rd
1	Cheryl Hole	25	Chelmsford, England	4th
1	Blu Hydrangea	23	Belfast, Northern Ireland	5th
1	Crystal	34	East London, England	6th
1	Sum Ting Wong	30	Birmingham, England	7th
1	Vinegar Strokes	34	North London, England	8th
1	Scaredy Kat	19	Cricklade, England	9th
1	Gothy Kendoll	21	Leicester, England	10th
2	Lawrence Chaney	23	Glasgow, Scotland	Winner
2	Bimini Bon-Boulash	26	Great Yarmouth, England	Runners-up
2	Tayce	26	Newport, Wales	Runners-up
2	Ellie Diamond	21	Dundee, Scotland	4th
2	A'Whora	23	Worksop, England	5th
2	Sister Sister	32	Liverpool, England	6th
2	Tia Kofi	30	South London, England	7th
2	Joe Black	30	Brighton, England	8th (Note: Joe Black originally placed twelfth before re-entering the competition.)
2	Veronica Green	34	Rochdale, England	9th (Note: The contestant was removed from the competition due to medical reasons.)
2	Ginny Lemon	31	Worcester, England	10th (Note: The contestant quit the competition.)
2	Asttina Mandella	27	East London, England	11th
2	Cherry Valentine†	26	Darlington, England	12th
3	Krystal Versace	19	Royal Tunbridge Wells, England	Winner
3	Ella Vaday	32	Dagenham, England	Runners-up
3	Kitty Scott-Claus	29	Birmingham, England	Runners-up
3	Vanity Milan	29	South London, England	4th
3	Scarlett Harlett	26	East London, England	5th
3	Choriza May	30	Newcastle upon Tyne, England	6th
3	River Medway	22	Medway, England	6th
3	Charity Kase	24	Rufford, England	8th
3	Veronica Green (Note: The contestant returned to compete after withdrawing from a previous season.)	35	Rochdale, England	9th
3	Victoria Scone	27	Cardiff, Wales	10th
3	Elektra Fence	29	Burnley, England	11th
3	Anubis	19	Brighton, England	12th
4	Danny Beard	29	Liverpool, England	Winner
4	Cheddar Gorgeous	38	Manchester, England	Runner-up
4	Black Peppa	29	Birmingham, England	3rd
4	Jonbers Blonde	33	Belfast, Northern Ireland	3rd
4	Pixie Polite	29	Brighton, England	5th
4	Dakota Schiffer	22	Horsham, England	6th
4	Le Fil	36	Brighouse, England	7th
4	Baby	25	South London, England	8th
4	Sminty Drop	23	Clitheroe, England	9th
4	Copper Topp	38	Cheltenham, England	10th
4	Starlet	23	Surrey, England	11th
4	Just May	32	Essex, England	12th
5	Ginger Johnson	34	Lanchester, England	Winner
5	Michael Marouli	39	Newcastle upon Tyne, England	Runner-up
5	Tomara Thomas	25	Hartlepool, England	3rd
5	DeDeLicious	20	Royal Tunbridge Wells, England	4th
5	Kate Butch	26	Buxton, England	5th
5	Cara Melle	26	London, England	6th
5	Vicki Vivacious	36	Redruth, England	7th
5	Banksie	23	Manchester, England	8th
5	Miss Naomi Carter	23	Doncaster, England	9th
5	Alexis Saint-Pete	28	London, England	10th
6	Kyran Thrax	26	Lancashire, England	Winner
6	La Voix	43	Stockton on Tees, England	Runner-up
6	Marmalade	24	Cardiff, Wales	3rd
6	Rileasa Slaves	32	London, England	3rd
6	Lill	36	Manchester, England	5th
6	Charra Tea	23	Belfast, Northern Ireland	6th (Note: The contestant was voted Miss Congeniality.)
6	Actavia	21	Bala, Wales	7th
6	Chanel O'Conor	25	Isle of Bute, Scotland	8th
6	Kiki Snatch	25	London, England	9th
6	Zahirah Zapanta	28	Nottingham, England	10th
6	Dita Garbo	48	Folkestone, England	11th
6	Saki Yew	33	Manchester, England	12th
7	Bones	25	London, England	Winner
7	Elle Vosque	22	Belfast, Northern Ireland	Runner-up
7	Catrin Feelings	26	Rhondda Valley, Wales	3rd
7	Silllexa Diction	26	Leeds, England	3rd
7	Tayris Mongardi	27	Brighton, England	5th
7	Bonnie Ann Clyde	30	Dublin, Republic of Ireland	6th
7	Paige Three	28	Guildford, England	7th
7	Sally™	27	South Shields, England	8th
7	Chai T Grande	32	London, England	9th
7	Nyongbella	25	London, England	10th
7	Viola	22	Coventry, England	11th
7	Pasty	30	Cornwall, England	12th
8	Flesh	27	Westminster, England	Winner
8	Mocha	26	Essex, England	Runners-up
8	Naya Thorn	24	Dudley, England	Runners-up
8	Alik	29	Brighton, England	4th
8	KY Kelly	42	Rugeley, England	5th
8	Coral-Hole Mandi	27	Ballymena, Northern Ireland	6th
8	Anita Piss	37	Birmingham, England	7th
8	Paris Baby	27	Hastings, England	8th
8	The Delta Quadrant	32	Darlington, England	9th
8	Tequila Thirst	39	North London, England	10th
8	ma_danni_x	48	The Wirral, England	11th
8	Lucky Roy Singh	36	Manchester, England	12th

== Deaths ==
- Cherry Valentine (30 November 1993 – 18 September 2022; aged 28), Series 2 contestant (12th place).
- The Vivienne (12 April 1992 – 3 January 2025; aged 32), Series 1 winner.
