= Diane Parish =

English actress (born 1969)

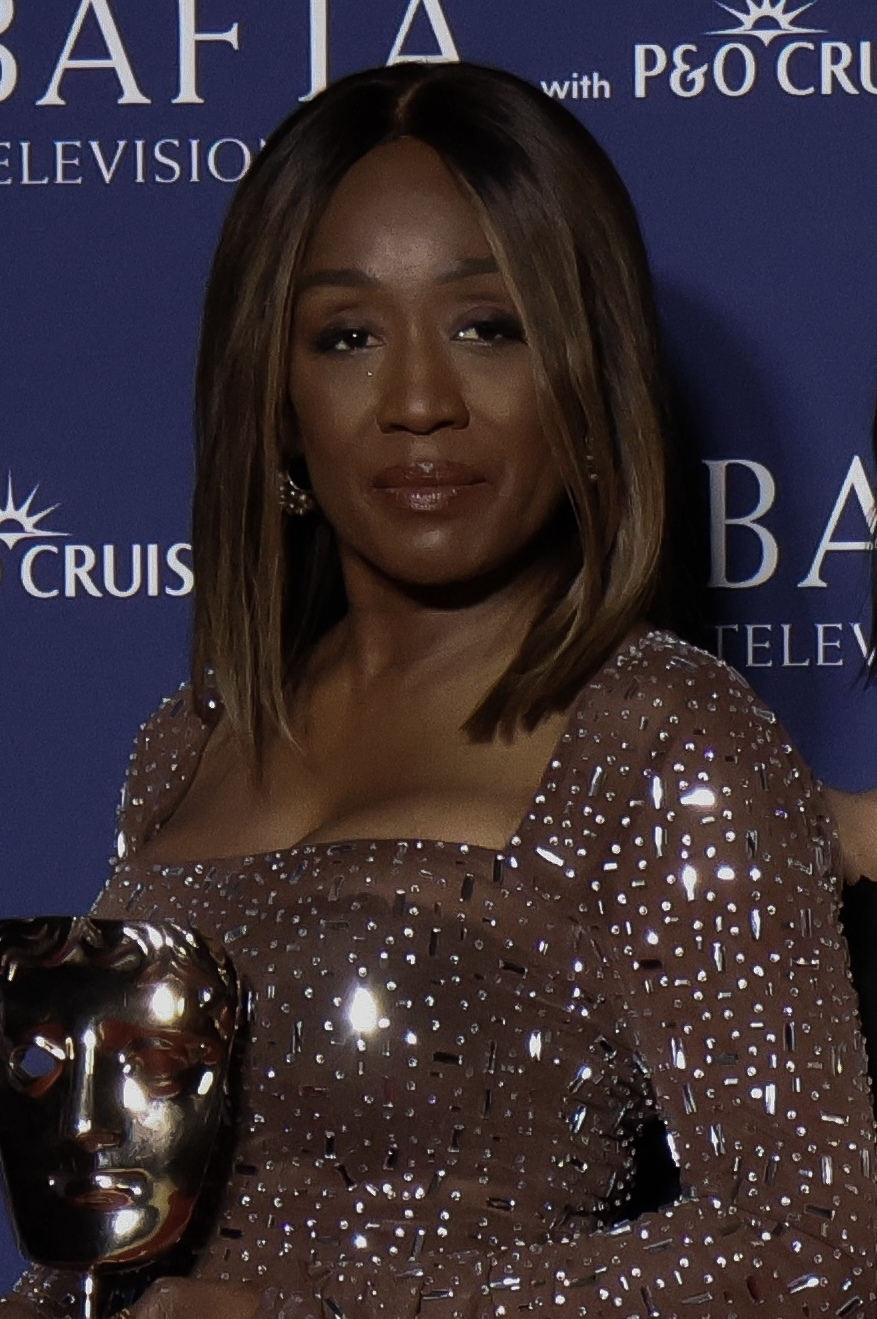
- Parish in 2026
- Born: Diane Carol Richards; 6 November 1969 (age 56); Tottenham, London, England
- Occupation: Actress
- Years active: 1991–present
- Children: 2

Diane Carol Richards (born 6 November 1969), known professionally as Diane Parish, is a British actress, who has been portraying the character Denise Fox on the BBC One soap opera EastEnders since 2006.

A graduate of the Royal Academy of Dramatic Art, Parish has acted on British television for over two decades. She has appeared in a number of TV shows over the years, including the ITV dramas The Bill and M.I.T.: Murder Investigation Team playing Detective Eva Sharpe. She is also known for appearing in two series of the BBC One comedy drama Lovejoy (1993–1994).

== Early life ==
Parish was born on 6 November 1969 in Tottenham, London and attended Kingsmead School in Enfield, where she wrote and performed in school drama productions before graduating from the Royal Academy of Dramatic Art.

== Career ==
After graduating from London's Royal Academy of Dramatic Art, she worked mainly in theatre, including playing Cordelia in Talawa Theatre Company's 1994 production of King Lear.

Parish has appeared in various television roles. In Lovejoy, she played Beth Taylor, the replacement for the character Eric Catchpole. Another television role was in the BBC soap opera EastEnders as Lola Christie, the girlfriend of Mick McFarlane (Sylvester Williams) and manager of the night café, in 1998.

Parish has also appeared in television dramas including The Bill and its spin-off M.I.T.: Murder Investigation Team, playing DC Eva Sharpe. Before The Bill she starred in Babyfather, for which she received the Royal Television Society's best actress award in 2001, becoming the first black actor to win a major RTS award. Parish returned to EastEnders in May 2006, but this time playing regular character Denise Fox. She departed from the soap opera temporarily in January 2008 in order to give birth to her daughter, returning in June that year. Parish appeared as Millie in the 1996 film Indian Summer (also released under the title Alive And Kicking). In September 2025, Parish was announced to appear in the seventh series of RuPaul's Drag Race UK as a special celebrity guest during a makeover challenge (episode "The Hun Makeover").

== Personal life ==
Parish is of Dominican and Montserratian descent. She has two daughters with her former partner, Sebastian Hagemeister.

== Filmography ==
Year	Film	Role	Notes
1993	Frank Stubbs Promotes	Receptionist	Episode: "Starlet"
1993	Screen One	Blackpool Waitress	Episode: "Wide-Eyed and Legless"
1993–1994	Lovejoy	Beth Taylor	Main role
1996	The Final Passage	Milkie	Television film
1996	Indian Summer	Millie	Film; also marketed as Alive and Kicking
1997	Casualty	Donna	Episode: "Déjà Vu"
1997	Holding On	Janet	Main role
1998	Picking Up the Pieces	Lisa Gee	Main role
1998	Driving Miss Daisy Crazy	Daisy	Short film
1998	EastEnders	Lola Christie	Regular role
1999	Real Women	Rachel	Recurring role
2000	The Vice	Shirley Robinson	Main role
2000–2001	Clocking Off	Sylvia Robinson	Main role
2001	Comedy Lab	Jacks	Episode: "Turn the World Down"
2001–2002	Babyfather	Lesley Bailey	Main role
2002–2004	The Bill	Eva Sharpe	Main role
2005	Holby City	Lucy Faulds	Episode: "Live and Let Die"
2005	Murder Investigation Team	Eva Sharpe	Recurring role
2005	Waking the Dead	Sheryl Palliser	Episodes: "Black Run: Parts 1 & 2"
2006–present	EastEnders	Denise Fox	Regular role
2010	East Street	Denise Fox	Charity crossover between Coronation Street and EastEnders
2010	EastEnders: Farewell Stacey	Denise Fox	Television film
2012	The B&B: Kim's Place	Denise Fox	2 episodes: "The Deadline" and "Branching Out"
2014	EastEnders: The Ghosts of Ian Beale	Denise Fox	Charity special
2020	The Queen Vic Quiz Night	Denise Fox	Charity crossover between Coronation Street and EastEnders
2020	EastEnders: Secrets from the Square	Herself	Episode: "Denise and Kim"
2023	EastEnders: The Six	Herself	2 episodes
2025	EastEnders Investigates: The Manosphere	Herself	Documentary
2025	RuPaul's Drag Race UK	Herself	Special guest; Series 7

== Awards and nominations ==
Year	Award	Category	Work	Result	Ref.
2002	Royal Television Society Programme Awards	Actor: Female	Babyfather	Won	
2002	8th National Television Awards	Most Popular Newcomer	The Bill	Nominated	
2007	The British Soap Awards	Best Actress	EastEnders	Nominated	
2010	15th National Television Awards	Serial Drama Performance	EastEnders	Nominated	
2010	Inside Soap Awards	Best Actress	EastEnders	Nominated	
2011	16th National Television Awards	Serial Drama Performance	EastEnders	Nominated	
2013	2013 British Soap Awards	Best Actress	EastEnders	Nominated	
2013	TV Choice Awards	Best Soap Actress	EastEnders	Nominated	
2014	19th National Television Awards	Serial Drama Performance	EastEnders	Nominated	
2014	2014 British Soap Awards	Best Actress	EastEnders	Nominated	
2014	TV Choice Awards	Best Soap Actress	EastEnders	Nominated	
2016	2016 British Soap Awards	Best Actress	EastEnders	Nominated	
2016	TV Choice Awards	Best Soap Actress	EastEnders	Nominated	
2017	22nd National Television Awards	Serial Drama Performance	EastEnders	Nominated	
2017	2017 British Soap Awards	Best Actress	EastEnders	Nominated	
2017	2017 British Soap Awards	Best Female Dramatic Performance	EastEnders	Nominated	
2017	Inside Soap Awards	Best Actress	EastEnders	Nominated	
2017	Digital Spy Reader Awards	Best Soap Actress	EastEnders	Seventh	
2018	23rd National Television Awards	Serial Drama Performance	EastEnders	Nominated	
2018	2018 British Soap Awards	Best Actress	EastEnders	Nominated	
2020	I Talk Telly Awards	Best Soap Performance	EastEnders	Nominated	
2021	I Talk Telly Awards	Best Soap Partnership (with Tameka Empson)	EastEnders	Nominated	
2023	2023 British Soap Awards	Best Leading Performer	EastEnders	Nominated	
2023	28th National Television Awards	Serial Drama Performance	EastEnders	Nominated	
2023	Inside Soap Awards	Best Actress	EastEnders	Nominated	
2024	29th National Television Awards	Serial Drama Performance	EastEnders	Nominated	
