= Pasty (drag queen) =

Drag performer

- Born: Jake Grover; 1994 or 1995 (age 30–31); Cornwall, England, United Kingdom
- Other name: Pasty Palmer
- Occupation: Drag performer
- Known for: RuPaul's Drag Race UK (series 7)

Pasty (formerly Pasty Palmer) is the stage name of Jake Grover, a drag performer. She competed on the seventh series of the British television series RuPaul's Drag Race UK.

== Early life ==
Grover was born in Cornwall.

== Career ==
Grover, in drag as Pasty, appeared in a viral video on TikTok, in which he performed burlesque dressed as a sausage roll. Pasty competed on the seventh series of the British television series RuPaul's Drag Race UK. She placed in the bottom on the first episode. She lost a lip-sync contest against Nyongbella but was spared elimination after her fellow contestants elected her to stay should she lose. The following episode, she placed in the bottom again. However, she lost her lip-sync against Viola and became the first queen eliminated from the competition.

== Personal life ==
Grover is based in East London. His stage name pays tribute to the Cornish snack of the same name, his former stage name comes from Patsy Palmer, who plays Bianca Jackson in the British soap opera EastEnders. He later dropped the surname after being frequently asked to reference the character.

== Filmography ==
- RuPaul's Drag Race UK (series 7; 2025)

== See also ==
- List of drag queens
- List of people from Cornwall
- Lists of people from London
