= RuPaul's Drag Race UK series 8 =

2026 series of RuPaul's Drag Race UK

RuPaul's Drag Race UK
- Series 8
- Promotional photo for Series 8
- Hosted by: RuPaul
- Judges: RuPaul; Michelle Visage; Alan Carr; Graham Norton
- No. of contestants: 12
- Winner: Flesh
- Runners-up: Mocha; Naya Thorn
- Miss Congeniality: Paris Baby
- No. of episodes: 10

Release
- Original network: BBC Three / BBC One (UK); WOW Presents Plus (International)
- Original release: 3 September – 5 November 2026

Season chronology
- ← Previous; Series 7

The eighth and final series of RuPaul's Drag Race UK premiered on BBC Three on 3 September 2026. RuPaul returned as the main host and head judge, with Michelle Visage, Alan Carr and Graham Norton forming the judging panel. The series began filming in January 2026.

== Production ==
On 19 September 2025, prior to the beginning of the seventh series it was announced via social media that casting for the eighth series was open. Applications for the series remained open until 17 October 2025. Filming for the series began in January 2026.

A "Meet the Queens" teaser aired on 29 July 2026, which featured the "Start Your Engines" slogan and confirmed the cast the reveal date. Three days prior to the cast reveal, the RuPaul's Drag Race UK social media pages began posting countdown teasers. The cast was subsequently revealed by the BBC alongside the promotional poster of RuPaul on 11 August 2026.

This is the final series to be co-produced by and air on BBC before the series moves to WOW Presents Plus from 2027 onwards.

== Contestants ==
Ages, names, and cities stated are at time of filming.

Contestants of RuPaul's Drag Race UK series 8 and their backgrounds
Contestant	Age	Hometown	Outcome
Flesh	25	Westminster, England	Winner
Mocha	26	Colchester, England	Runners-up
Naya Thorn	24	Dudley, England	Runners-up
Alik	29	Brighton, England	4th place
KY Kelly	42	Rugeley, England	5th place
Coral-Hole Mandi	27	Ballymena, Northern Ireland	6th place
Anita Piss	37	Birmingham, England	7th place
Paris Baby	27	Hastings, England	8th place (Note: Paris Baby was voted Miss Congeniality by fellow contestants.)
The Delta Quadrant	32	Darlington, England	9th place
Tequila Thirst	39	Chester, England	10th place
ma_danni_x	48	The Wirral, England	11th place
Lucky Roy Singh	36	Manchester, England	12th place (Note: Lucky Roy Singh was forced to withdraw from the competition due to illness.)

== Contestant progress ==
Legend:

Flesh won RuPaul's Drag Race UK series 8.
Mocha and Naya Thorn were the runners-up.
Paris Baby was voted Miss Congeniality (Miss C) by fellow contestants.
WIN indicates that the contestant won the challenge.
TOP2 indicates that the contestant was one of the two best performing in the challenge, but lost the lip sync to win it.
SAFE indicates that the contestant was declared safe by the judges.
BTM (Bottom) indicates that the contestant was up for elimination.
ELIM (Eliminated) indicates that the contestant was eliminated.
WDR (Withdraw) indicates that Lucky Roy Singh was forced to withdraw from the competition due to illness.
Guest indicates that the contestant returned as a guest.

Contestants progress with placements in each episode
Contestant	Episode									
Contestant	1	2	3	4	5	6	7	8	9	10
Flesh	SAFE	SAFE	SAFE	SAFE	WIN	SAFE	SAFE	WIN	SAFE	Winner
Mocha	SAFE	WIN	SAFE	WIN	SAFE	SAFE	SAFE	SAFE	SAFE	Runner-up
Naya Thorn	TOP2	SAFE	SAFE	SAFE	SAFE	BTM	WIN	SAFE	WIN	Runner-up
Alik	SAFE	SAFE	BTM	SAFE	SAFE	WIN	SAFE	BTM	BTM	Eliminated
KY Kelly	WIN	SAFE	SAFE	WIN	BTM	SAFE	SAFE	SAFE	ELIM	Guest
Coral-Hole Mandi	SAFE	SAFE	WIN	SAFE	SAFE	SAFE	TOP2	ELIM	Guest	Guest
Anita Piss	SAFE	SAFE	SAFE	SAFE	SAFE	ELIM			Guest	Guest
Paris Baby	SAFE	SAFE	SAFE	BTM	ELIM				Guest	Miss C
The Delta Quadrant	SAFE	SAFE	SAFE	ELIM					Guest	Guest
Tequila Thirst	SAFE	BTM	ELIM						Guest	Guest
ma_danni_x	SAFE	ELIM							Guest	Guest
Lucky Roy Singh	SAFE	WDR							Guest	Guest

== Lip syncs ==
The contestant won the lip sync to win the challenge.
The contestant was eliminated after their first time in the bottom.
The contestant was eliminated after their second time in the bottom.
The contestant won the Lip Sync for the Crown and was declared the winner of the season.

Episode	Top contestants			Song	Winner
1	KY Kelly	vs.	Naya Thorn	"Where Is My Husband!" (Raye)	KY Kelly
Episode	Bottom contestants			Song	Eliminated
2	ma_danni_x	vs.	Tequila Thirst	"Where Love Lives" (Alison Limerick)	ma_danni_x
3	Alik	vs.	Tequila Thirst	"The Look of Love" (ABC)	Tequila Thirst
4	Paris Baby	vs.	The Delta Quadrant	"Shine" (Booty Luv)	The Delta Quadrant
5	KY Kelly	vs.	Paris Baby	"Take Me to Your Heart" (Rick Astley)	Paris Baby
6	Anita Piss	vs.	Naya Thorn	"Kiss My (Uh-Oh)" (Anne-Marie, Little Mix)	Anita Piss
Episode	Top contestants			Song	Winner
7	Coral-Hole Mandi	vs.	Naya Thorn	"It Girl" (Jade)	Naya Thorn
Episode	Bottom contestants			Song	Eliminated
8	Alik	vs.	Coral-Hole Mandi	"Call Me Mother" (RuPaul)	Coral-Hole Mandi
9	Alik	vs.	KY Kelly	"Showing Out (Get Fresh at the Weekend)" (Mel and Kim)	KY Kelly
Episode	Final contestants			Song	Winner
10	Flesh vs. Mocha vs. Naya Thorn			"Modern Love" (David Bowie)	Flesh

== Guest judges ==
Listed in chronological order:

- Thandiwe Newton, actress
- Erin O'Connor, model
- Martin Fry, singer
- Layton Williams, actor, dancer and singer
- Michèle Lamy, entrepreneur
- Rick Astley, singer
- Anne-Marie, singer
- Kadiff Kirwan, actor
- Cat Burns, singer
- Michelle de Swarte, actress and comedian

=== Special guests ===
Guests who appeared in episodes, but did not judge on the main stage.

Episode 2

- Kristen McMenamy, model
- Raven, runner-up on both RuPaul's Drag Race Season 2 and All Stars 1

Episode 3

- Arian Nik, actor
- Duncan James, singer

Episode 4

- Claudimar Neto, choreographer
- Jono McNeil, vocal coach
- Mazz Murray, singer and actress

Episode 5

- Just May, contestant from RuPaul's Drag Race UK Series 4

Episode 6

- Booty Luv, musical duo
- Freddie Scott, music producer

Episode 10

- Claudimar Neto, choreographer
- Bones, winner of RuPaul's Drag Race UK Series 7

== Episodes ==
No. overall	No. in series	Title	Original release date
69	1	"Keep Calm and Drag On"	3 September 2026
Twelve new queens enter the werkroom. For the first main challenge, the queens will perform a talent show in the Werkin' Queens' Club. RuPaul also announce that the queens will rank each other using Rate-A-Queen.: Alik – Original song; Anita Piss – Comedy performance; Coral-Hole Mandi – Original song; Flesh – Burlesque; KY Kelly – Original song; Lucky Roy Singh – Original song; ma_danni_x – Original song; Mocha – Original song; Naya Thorn – Comedy song; Paris Baby – Original song; Tequila Thirst – Original song; The Delta Quadrant – Comedy performance; On the runway, category is Ru Are Ya? Coral-Hole Mandi, The Delta Quadrant, KY Kelly, Mocha, Naya Thorn and Tequila Thirst are the top six queens based on Rate-A-Queen result and receive positive critiques. It is announced that KY Kelly and Naya Thorn are the top two queens of the week and will lip-sync for the win. They lip-sync to "Where Is My Husband!" by Raye. After the lip sync, KY Kelly is announced as the winner of the challenge. RuPaul then announces that no one is going home.: Guest Judge: Thandiwe Newton; Alternating Judge: Alan Carr; Main Challenge: Perform a talent show in the Werkin' Queens' Club; Runway Theme: Ru Are Ya?; Top Two: KY Kelly and Naya Thorn; Lip-Sync Song: "Where Is My Husband!" by Raye; Challenge Winner: KY Kelly; Eliminated: None
70	2	"Goodies and Baddies"	10 September 2026
For this week's main challenge, the queens split into two groups and need to create looks for Goodie Gala and Baddie Ball. Before the runway begins, Lucky Roy Singh announces to the group that she will be leaving the competition due to illness.: The Goodie Gala: Anita Piss, Coral-Hole Mandi, Lucky Roy Singh, ma_danni_x, Tequila Thirst, The Delta Quadrant; The Baddie Ball: Alik, Flesh, KY Kelly, Mocha, Naya Thorn, Paris Baby; On the runway, category is Goodie Gala and Baddie Ball. Anita Piss, KY Kelly, and Mocha receive positive critiques, with Mocha winning the challenge. Flesh, ma_danni_x, and Tequila Thirst receive negative critiques, with Flesh being safe. ma_danni_x and Tequila Thirst lip-sync to "Where Love Lives" by Alison Limerick. Tequila Thirst wins the lip-sync and ma_danni_x is the first queen to sashay away.: Guest Judge: Erin O'Connor; Alternating Judge: Graham Norton; Withdrew: Lucky Roy Singh; Main Challenge: Create looks for Goodie Gala and Baddie Ball; Runway Theme: Goodie Gala and Baddie Ball; Challenge Winner: Mocha; Bottom Two: ma_danni_x and Tequila Thirst; Lip-Sync Song: "Where Love Lives" by Alison Limerick; Eliminated: ma_danni_x; Farewell Message: "To the fabulous girls. Good Luck LOVE ma_danni_x x"
71	3	"Snatch Me If You Can"	17 September 2026
For this week's main challenge, the queens play the Snatch Game in two separate groups. Duncan James star as the celebrity contestants in the first group. Arian Nik star as the celebrity contestants in the second group. The cast consisted of: Group 1: Alik as Rupert Everett (as Camilla Fritton from St Trinian's movie); Flesh as Charlotte Tilbury; KY Kelly as Jane McDonald; Tequila Thirst as Helena Bonham-Carter; The Delta Quadrant as Mary Todd Lincoln; Group 2: Anita Piss as Bill Skarsgård (as Count Orlok from Nosferatu movie); Coral-Hole Mandi as Jane Turner and Gina Riley (as Kath Day-Knight and Kim Craig from Kath & Kim); Mocha as Guy Fawkes; Naya Thorn as Gretel; Paris Baby as Eve; On the runway, category is Kitsch, Please! Coral-Hole Mandi, The Delta Quadrant, and Naya Thorn receive positive critiques, with Coral-Hole Mandi winning the challenge. Alik, Paris Baby, and Tequila Thirst receive negative critiques, with Paris Baby being safe. Alik and Tequila Thirst lip-sync to "The Look of Love" by ABC. Alik wins the lip-sync and Tequila Thirst sashays away.: Guest Judge: Martin Fry; Alternating Judge: Alan Carr; Main Challenge: Snatch Game; Runway Theme: Kitsch, Please!; Challenge Winner: Coral-Hole Mandi; Bottom Two: Alik and Tequila Thirst; Lip-Sync Song: "The Look of Love" by ABC; Eliminated: Tequila Thirst; Farewell Message: "The bar has run dry. Stay thirsty! Have a shot for me. Tequila Thirst 🍋‍🟩"
72	4	"Croydon – The Rusical"	24 September 2026
For this week's main challenge, the queens perform in Croydon – The Rusical.: Alik plays Chorus Girl; Anita Piss plays Pat the Dinner Lady; Coral-Hole Mandi plays Tilly Binn; Flesh plays Muffy; KY Kelly plays Nana Norton; Mocha plays Selma Bussy; Naya Thorn plays Baby Queen; Paris Baby plays Foxy Tart; The Delta Quadrant plays Sue the Dinner Lady; On the runway, category is Booked and Blessed. KY Kelly, Mocha, and Naya Thorn receive positive critiques, with KY Kelly and Mocha winning the challenge. Anita Piss, Paris Baby, and The Delta Quadrant receive negative critiques, with Anita Piss being safe. Paris Baby and The Delta Quadrant lip-sync to "Shine" by Booty Luv. Paris Baby wins the lip-sync and The Delta Quadrant sashays away.: Guest Judge: Layton Williams; Alternating Judge: Graham Norton; Main Challenge: Croydon – The Rusical; Runway Theme: Booked and Blessed; Challenge Winner: KY Kelly and Mocha; Bottom Two: Paris Baby and The Delta Quadrant; Lip-Sync Song: "Shine" by Booty Luv; Eliminated: The Delta Quadrant; Farewell Message: "SEE YOU MONDAY, 9AM. KIND REGARDS, TDQ"
73	5	"The Piggy Pageant"	1 October 2026
For this week's main challenge, the queens create three looks for The Piggy Pageant: This Little Piggy..., Pig Sty Chic and Go Ham! (OTT Pink Look). On the runway, Alik, Coral-Hole Mandi, and Flesh receive positive critiques, with Flesh winning the challenge. Anita Piss, KY Kelly, and Paris Baby receive negative critiques, with Anita Piss being safe. KY Kelly and Paris Baby lip-sync to "Take Me to Your Heart" by Rick Astley. KY Kelly wins the lip-sync and Paris Baby sashays away.: Guest Judge: Michèle Lamy and Rick Astley; Alternating Judge: Graham Norton; Main Challenge: The Piggy Pageant; Runway Theme: This Little Piggy..., Pig Sty Chic and Go Ham! (OTT Pink Look); Challenge Winner: Flesh; Bottom Two: KY Kelly and Paris Baby; Lip-Sync Song: "Take Me to Your Heart" by Rick Astley; Eliminated: Paris Baby; Farewell Message: "#ROBBED Naya 4 Da Crown 👑 Paris Baby ❤️"
74	6	"Holiday Hits"	8 October 2026
For this week's main challenge, the queens write, record, and perform verses to remake of "Agadoo" by Black Lace.: Team S.P.F: Alik, Coral-Hole Mandi, Flesh, and Mocha; Team Holi-Huns: Anita Piss, KY Kelly, and Naya Thorn; On the runway, category is Big Wigs. Team S.P.F receive positive critiques, with Alik winning the challenge. Team Holi-Huns receive negative critiques, with KY Kelly being safe. Anita Piss and Naya Thorn lip-sync to "Kiss My (Uh-Oh)" by Anne-Marie and Little Mix. Naya Thorn wins the lip-sync and Anita Piss sashays away.: Guest Judge: Anne-Marie; Alternating Judge: Alan Carr; Main Challenge: Write, record, and perform verses to remake of "Agadoo" by Black Lace; Runway Theme: Big Wigs; Challenge Winner: Alik; Bottom Two: Anita Piss and Naya Thorn; Lip-Sync Song: "Kiss My (Uh-Oh)" by Anne-Marie and Little Mix; Eliminated: Anita Piss; Farewell Message: "Hurricane Anita, She came, she pissed, she conquered. OX Love You all, Anita XXX"
75	7	"Ghost Hunties"	15 October 2026
For this week's mini-challenge, the queens read each other to filth. Alik wins the mini-challenge. For the main challenge, the queens act in paranormal TV show parody, Ghost Hunties.: Alik plays Claudia Wrinklebottom; Coral-Hole Mandi plays possessed queen; Flesh plays Maureen the Caretaker; KY Kelly plays Janine the Ghostbuster; Mocha plays Mystic Muff; Naya Thorn plays Miss Mona Lot; On the runway, category is Torn This Way. Alik, Coral-Hole Mandi, Flesh, KY Kelly and Naya Thorn receive positive critiques. It is announced that Coral-Hole Mandi and Naya Thorn are the top two queens of the week and will lip-sync for the win. They lip-sync to "It Girl" by Jade. After the lip sync, Naya Thorn is announced as the winner of the challenge. RuPaul then announces that no one is going home.: Guest Judge: Kadiff Kirwan; Alternating Judge: Graham Norton; Mini-Challenge: Reading is Fundamental; Mini-Challenge Winner: Alik; Main Challenge: Act in paranormal TV show parody Ghost Hunties; Runway Theme: Torn This Way; Top Two: Coral-Hole Mandi and Naya Thorn; Lip-Sync Song: "It Girl" by Jade; Challenge Winner: Naya Thorn; Eliminated: None
76	8	"Relative Beauties"	22 October 2026
For this week's main challenge, the queens makeover their loved ones. On the runway, category is Drag Family Resemblance. Flesh, Mocha and Naya Thorn receive positive critiques, with Flesh winning the challenge. Alik and Coral-Hole Mandi receive negative critiques, and are announced as the bottom two. They lip-sync to "Call Me Mother" by RuPaul. Alik wins the lip-sync and Coral-Hole Mandi sashays away.: Guest Judge: Cat Burns; Alternating Judge: Alan Carr; Main Challenge: Makeover a loved one; Runway Theme: Drag Family Resemblance; Challenge Winner: Flesh; Bottom Two: Alik and Coral-Hole Mandi; Lip-Sync Song: "Call Me Mother" by RuPaul; Eliminated: Coral-Hole Mandi; Farewell Message: "SHE SELLS 🐚🐚 CUZ SHE'S A SEA WHORE CORAL-HOLE MANDI 💋"
77	9	"The Last Laugh"	29 October 2026
For this week's main challenge, the queens perform a roast of their fellow competitors and the eliminated queens in the "Naff-Ta Awards" roast. On the runway, category is Tickety Blue. Flesh, Mocha and Naya Thorn receive positive critiques, with Naya Thorn winning the challenge. Alik and KY Kelly receive negative critiques, and are announced as the bottom two. They lip-sync to "Showing Out (Get Fresh at the Weekend)" by Mel and Kim. Alik wins the lip-sync and KY Kelly sashays away.: Guest Judge: Michelle de Swarte; Alternating Judge: Alan Carr; Main Challenge: Perform a roast of their fellow competitors and the eliminated queens of Series 8; Runway Theme: Tickety Blue; Challenge Winner: Naya Thorn; Bottom Two: Alik and KY Kelly; Lip-Sync Song: "Showing Out (Get Fresh at the Weekend)" by Mel and Kim; Eliminated: KY Kelly; Farewell Message: "You Divas are AMAZING I've LOVED This Journey With you Lots of Love KY xxx"
78	10	"Rule Britannia"	5 November 2026
