= Viola (drag queen) =

Drag performer

- Born: Niall Trowsdale Stannard; 2002 or 2003 (age 23–24)
- Other name: Viola Viagra
- Education: Manchester Metropolitan University
- Occupation: Drag performer
- Television: Queen of the Universe (season 2); RuPaul's Drag Race UK (series 7)

Viola is the stage name of Niall Trowsdale Stannard, a British drag performer who competed on the second season of Queen of the Universe and the seventh series of RuPaul's Drag Race UK.

== Career ==
Stannard's first experience with drag was performing as the Killer Queen in a school production of We Will Rock You. His initial drag style was inspired by Trixie Mattel, and his stage name, Viola, is a homage to the violin, an instrument that Stannard began playing at the age of seven. He additionally began playing the flute at age fourteen.

Viola was a contestant on the seventh series of RuPaul's Drag Race UK, where she placed in the bottom two on the second episode, but won a lip-sync contest against Pasty, and was safe from elimination. In the following episode, she placed in the bottom again; however, she lost a lip-sync against Nyongbella and became the second queen eliminated from the competition.

== Personal life ==
Stannard was raised in Coventry and is currently based in Manchester. He attended Manchester Metropolitan University.

== Filmography ==
- Queen of the Universe
- RuPaul's Drag Race UK (series 7; 2025)
