= Ma Danni X =

Drag performer and entertainer

- Born: 1977 or 1978 (age 48–49); The Wirral, United Kingdom
- Occupation: Drag queen
- Television: RuPaul's Drag Race UK (series 8)

Ma Danni X (stylized as ma_danni_x; sometimes ma_dannii_x) is a British drag queen and entertainer. She has appeared on Britain's Got Talent and Project Catwalk and competed on the eighth series of RuPaul's Drag Race UK.

== Career ==
ma_danni_x has been doing drag since the age of 21. She began her career as a dancer on cruise ships. She has appeared The Club for Samantha Fox, Project Catwalk with Kelly Osbourne, and Britain's Got Talent. She competed on the eighth series of RuPaul's Drag Race UK and was eliminated in the second episode, a sewing challenge, finishing in 11th place out of 12.

== Personal life ==
ma_danni_x is originally from Wirral and now based in West London.
