= Kingsmead School, Enfield =

Kingsmead School

Location
- Southbury Road; Enfield, Greater London, EN1 1YQ; England
- Coordinates: 51.6510°N 0.0619°W

Information
- Type: Academy
- Motto: Practise to Perfect
- Established: 1967
- Specialist: Arts (visual and performing arts)
- Department for Education URN: 136327 Tables
- Ofsted: Reports
- Headteacher: David Medway
- Staff: 165
- Gender: Mixed
- Age: 11 to 19
- Enrolment: 1,560
- Website: http://www.kingsmeadschool.org/

Kingsmead School is a mixed secondary school and sixth form located on Southbury Road in Enfield, Greater London, England. It operates as an academy and caters for students aged 11 to 18.

== History ==
The school was established in 1967. In October 2010 it converted to academy status, having previously been a community school administered by Enfield London Borough Council. In 2006, Kingsmead was designated a specialist college in the performing and visual arts. In 2004, it was part of a sanctions scheme where children were sent as a punishment to Lea Valley Academy, rather than being temporarily excluded. The school also had a behaviour improvement programme manager, and Ofsted said that "they had seen nothing in any other school to equal Kingsmead's work on behaviour".

== Enrolment ==
The school has approximately 1,450–1,560 students on roll, operating at or near full capacity.

== Academic performance and curriculum ==
Kingsmead offers a broad academic programme, including GCSEs and A-Levels, with particular emphasis on EBacc subjects and the arts. In 2017, its A-Level outcomes ranked in the top 4% nationally. The most recent Ofsted inspection (April 2022) rated the school as "Good", praising its ambitious curriculum, high standards of behaviour, and strong pastoral support.

== Sixth form ==
It offers a range of A-Level courses, including subjects often unavailable in smaller schools, such as Music, Music Technology, French, Spanish, and a Computer Science course.

== Notable former pupils ==
- Diane Parish (1981–1985), actor known for her portrayal of Denise Fox in the BBC soap opera EastEnders.
- Jessie Wallace (1982–1986), actress known for her portrayal as Kat Slater in the BBC soap opera EastEnders.
