= Lucky Roy Singh =

British drag performer and LGBTQ activist

Lucky Roy Singh is a British drag performer and LGBTQ activist who competed on the eighth series of RuPaul's Drag Race UK.

== Career ==
Lucky Roy Singh has been doing drag for more than a decade. She is the first Sikh South Asian contestant to compete on RuPaul's Drag Race UK.

Lucky Roy Singh is also an LGBTQ activist. She was recognized for advocacy work at the 2019 Attitude Pride Awards. She was nominated in the LGBTQ+ influencer of the Year category at the Gaydio Awards in 2024.

Lucky Roy Singh is the head of the House of Spice collective of LGBTQ people of color in Manchester. In 2025, she led a Kulture Kabaret showcase at Manchester Pride, featuring Saki Yew and Zahirah Zapanta. Previously, Lucky Roy Singh led the festival's Queer Asian Takeover.

== Personal life ==
Lucky Roy Singh is gay and non-binary. Lucky Roy Singh is based in Manchester and uses the pronouns she/her in drag.

== See also ==
- List of people from Manchester
