= Bones (drag queen) =

English drag performer (born 1999)

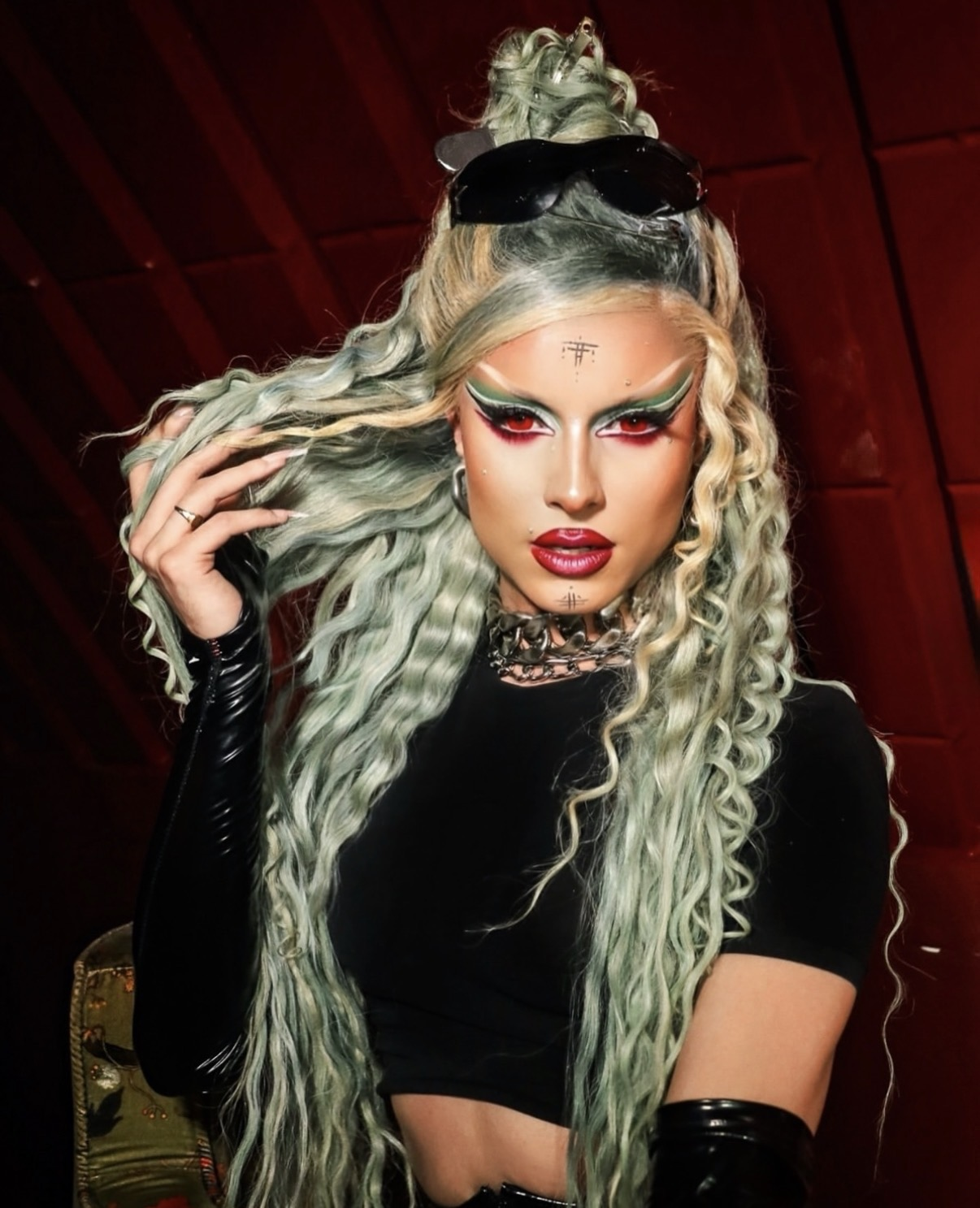
- Bones pictured in 2024
- Born: Paul Greaves; 18 March 1999 (age 27)
- Occupation: Drag performer
- Years active: 2018–present
- Television: RuPaul's Drag Race UK (series 7)
- Website: www.itsjustbones.com

Paul Greaves (born 18 March 1999), known professionally by the stage name Bones, is an English drag queen known for winning the seventh series of the reality show RuPaul's Drag Race UK (2025).

== Career ==
Bones started doing drag at the age of 19 "by accident" after meeting Jodie Harsh and being introduced to the club scene. Bones named herself in the shower after trying to find a name that was neither masculine nor feminine. She is in the same "drag family" as Series 3 winner Krystal Versace, Series 5 contestant DeDeLicious, and Series 8 winner Flesh. She was also part of Krystal Versace's BBC reality series Keeping Up with Krystal Versace.

Bones is part of a drag duo with fellow drag performer Flesh, with whom she has performed at the regular bi-weekly show Heavenly Bodies at Freedom Bar in Soho, London since 2021. She has also hosted a regular drag show, Lana Del Rave, across London, based on the music and styling of American singer-songwriter Lana Del Rey. Her drag has been described as "gothic glamour", "witchy" and having a "dark element".

== Personal life ==
Greaves is from a village near Manchester and moved to London when he was 18.

Bones uses she/her and they/them pronouns while in drag and he/him pronouns out of drag. He has a Fine Art degree and is currently based in London.

== Filmography ==
Year	Title	Role	Notes	Ref.
2023	Keeping Up with Krystal Versace	Self	Part of the Krystal Versace drag family	
2025	RuPaul's Drag Race UK	Self (contestant)	Winner; Series 7	
