= Flesh (drag queen) =

English drag performer

Flesh is the stage name of Oli Varela, a British drag queen who competed and won the eighth series of RuPaul's Drag Race UK in 2026.

== Early life and education ==
Varela studied English literature at Hertford College, Oxford, completing her final year of study remotely due to the COVID-19 pandemic. She felt that attending Oxford was an obligation to please her parents; upon achieving the A-level results required to take up her place, she recalled, "I was like, I have to go. I have to go because I’ve done it." She felt reluctant to incorporate queerness into her university work, stating that "in Oxford, as a student, it absolutely felt like there was no room to be expressive."

Varela discovered drag at the age of 15 after stumbling upon performances by RuPaul's Drag Race alum Willam on YouTube. She credits the Oxford drag collective Hot Mess with giving her her first opportunity to perform on stage at their Halloween party.

== Career ==
Flesh runs the show Heavenly Bodies in Soho, with Bones.

Flesh competed on the eighth series of RuPaul's Drag Race UK and won.

== Personal life ==
Based in London, Varela is of Spanish heritage.

Flesh is inspired by British fashion and 1990s supermodels. She is in a "drag family" with Bones, DeDeLicious and Krystal Versace. Flesh uses the pronouns she/her.

== Filmography ==
- RuPaul's Drag Race UK (series 8, 2026)
