= RuPaul's Drag Race UK series 7 =

2025 series of RuPaul's Drag Race UK

RuPaul's Drag Race UK
- Series 7
- Promotional poster for Series 7
- Hosted by: RuPaul
- Judges: RuPaul; Michelle Visage; Alan Carr; Graham Norton
- No. of contestants: 12
- Winner: Bones
- Runner-up: Elle Vosque
- Miss Congeniality: Chai T Grande
- No. of episodes: 10

Release
- Original network: BBC Three / BBC One (UK); WOW Presents Plus (International)
- Original release: 25 September – 27 November 2025

Series chronology
- ← Previous; Series 6

The seventh series of RuPaul's Drag Race UK premiered on BBC Three on 25 September 2025. RuPaul returned as the main host and head judge, with Michelle Visage, Alan Carr and Graham Norton forming the judging panel. The series began filming in January 2025.

== Production ==
On 13 September 2024, prior to the beginning of the sixth series it was announced via social media that casting for the seventh series was now open. Applications remained open for four weeks until closing on 11 October 2024. Filming for the series began in January 2025 at Pinewood Studios in Buckinghamshire.

The first teaser trailer for the series aired on 11 August 2025, with various close up shots of the queens accompanied by the caption "Start Your Engines". The cast was subsequently revealed by the BBC on 22 August 2025, alongside the promotional poster for the series featuring RuPaul.

== Contestants ==
Ages, names, and cities stated are at time of filming.

Contestants of RuPaul's Drag Race UK series 7 and their backgrounds
Contestant	Age	Hometown	Outcome
Bones	25	London, England	Winner
Elle Vosque	22	Belfast, Northern Ireland	Runner-up
Catrin Feelings	26	Treorchy, Wales	3rd place
Silllexa Diction	26	Leeds, England	3rd place
Tayris Mongardi	27	Brighton, England	5th place
Bonnie Ann Clyde	30	Dublin, Republic of Ireland	6th place
Paige Three	28	Guildford, England	7th place
Sally™	27	South Shields, England	8th place
Chai T Grande	32	London, England	9th place (Note: Chai T Grande was voted Miss Congeniality by fellow contestants.)
Nyongbella	25	London, England	10th place
Viola	22	Coventry, England	11th place
Pasty	30	St Austell, England	12th place

== Contestant progress ==
Legend:

Bones won RuPaul's Drag Race UK series 7.
Elle Vosque was the runner-up.
Chai T Grande was voted Miss Congeniality (Miss C) by fellow contestants.
WIN indicates that the contestant won the challenge.
SAFE indicates that the contestant was declared safe by the judges.
Pasty lost the lip sync, but was revealed to have been voted the Lucky Cow (LC) by the other contestants and therefore saved from elimination.
BTM (Bottom) indicates that the contestant was up for elimination.
ELIM (Eliminated) indicates that the contestant was eliminated.
Guest indicates that the contestant returned as a guest.

Contestants progress with placements in each episode
Contestant	Episode									
Contestant	1	2	3	4	5	6	7	8	9	10
Bones	SAFE	SAFE	WIN	SAFE	BTM	SAFE	BTM	WIN	WIN	Winner
Elle Vosque	WIN	SAFE	SAFE	SAFE	SAFE	WIN	SAFE	SAFE	SAFE	Runner-up
Catrin Feelings	SAFE	SAFE	SAFE	SAFE	SAFE	SAFE	SAFE	BTM	BTM	Eliminated
Silllexa Diction	SAFE	SAFE	SAFE	BTM	WIN	SAFE	SAFE	SAFE	SAFE	Eliminated
Tayris Mongardi	SAFE	SAFE	SAFE	SAFE	SAFE	BTM	SAFE	SAFE	ELIM	Guest
Bonnie Ann Clyde	SAFE	SAFE	SAFE	WIN	SAFE	SAFE	WIN	ELIM	Guest	Guest
Paige Three	SAFE	SAFE	SAFE	SAFE	SAFE	WIN	ELIM		Guest	Guest
Sally™	SAFE	WIN	SAFE	SAFE	SAFE	ELIM			Guest	Guest
Chai T Grande	SAFE	SAFE	SAFE	SAFE	ELIM				Guest	Miss C
Nyongbella	BTM	SAFE	BTM	ELIM					Guest	Guest
Viola	SAFE	BTM	ELIM						Guest	Guest
Pasty	LC	ELIM							Guest	Guest

== Lip syncs ==
Legend:

The contestant won the lip sync to win the challenge.
The contestant was eliminated after their first time in the bottom.
The contestant was eliminated after their second time in the bottom.
The contestant was eliminated after their third time in the bottom.
The contestant won the Lip Sync for the Crown and was declared the winner of the season.

Episode	Bottom contestants			Song	Eliminated
1	Nyongbella	vs.	Pasty	"Von Dutch" (Charli XCX)	None (Note: Pasty lost the lip sync, but was revealed to have been voted the Lucky Cow by the other queens and therefore saved from elimination.)
2	Pasty	vs.	Viola	"Heartbreak (Make Me a Dancer)" (Freemasons, Sophie Ellis-Bextor)	Pasty
3	Nyongbella	vs.	Viola	"Sound of the Underground" (Girls Aloud)	Viola
4	Nyongbella	vs.	Silllexa Diction	"Pearls" (Jessie Ware)	Nyongbella
5	Bones	vs.	Chai T Grande	"Spectrum (Say My Name)" (Florence and the Machine, Calvin Harris)	Chai T Grande
6	Sally™	vs.	Tayris Mongardi	"Don't Rain on My Parade" (Shirley Bassey)	Sally™
7	Bones	vs.	Paige Three	"Tainted Love" (Soft Cell)	Paige Three
8	Bonnie Ann Clyde	vs.	Catrin Feelings	"Push the Button" (Sugababes)	Bonnie Ann Clyde
9	Catrin Feelings	vs.	Tayris Mongardi	"Mamma Knows Best" (Jessie J)	Tayris Mongardi
Episode	Final contestants			Song	Winner
10	Bones	vs.	Elle Vosque	"You Make Me Feel (Mighty Real)" (Jimmy Somerville)	Bones

== Guest judges ==
Listed in chronological order:

- Joel Dommett, comedian, television presenter and actor
- Michelle de Swarte, actress and comedian
- Nadine Coyle, singer
- Jane Horrocks, actress
- Jamie-Lee O'Donnell, actress
- Mazz Murray, singer and actress
- Susan Wokoma, actress
- Mutya Buena, singer and songwriter
- Sophie Willan, actress, comedian and writer

=== Special guests ===
Guests who appeared in episodes, but did not judge on the main stage.

Episode 1

- Angeria Paris VanMicheals, contestant from RuPaul's Drag Race Season 14, and winner of All Stars 9
- Baga Chipz, contestant from RuPaul's Drag Race UK Series 1 and UK vs. the World Series 1
- Marina Summers, runner-up of Drag Race Philippines Season 1, and contestant from UK vs. the World Series 2
- Plane Jane, contestant from RuPaul's Drag Race Season 16
- Tessa Testicle, contestant from Drag Race Germany and Global All Stars

Episode 2

- Raven, runner-up on both RuPaul's Drag Race Season 2 and All Stars 1

Episode 3

- Ian Masterson, music producer

Episode 5

- La Voix, runner-up on RuPaul's Drag Race UK Series 6

Episode 6

- Claudimar Neto, choreographer
- Jono McNeil, vocal coach

Episode 7

- Jordan North, radio DJ and television presenter
- Kitty Scott-Claus, runner-up on RuPaul's Drag Race UK Series 3 and Global All Stars

Episode 8

- Charlotte Church, singer-songwriter and actress
- Shobna Gulati, actor and television presenter
- Dani Harmer, actress and television personality
- Michelle McManus, singer, radio broadcaster and columnist
- Diane Parish, EastEnders actress
- David Potts, reality television personality

Episode 10

- Claudimar Neto, choreographer
- Kyran Thrax, winner of RuPaul's Drag Race UK Series 6

== Episodes ==
No. overall	No. in series	Title	Original release date
59	1	"Queens of the Brit Gala"	25 September 2025
Twelve new queens enter the werkroom. For the first main challenge, the queens must showcase a signature look at the Brit Gala, before being interviewed by previous Drag Race queens.: Angeria Paris VanMicheals: Silllexa Diction, Viola; Baga Chipz: Bones, Paige Three, Sally™; Marina Summers: Chai T Grande, Pasty; Plane Jane: Bonnie Ann Clyde, Elle Vosque, Tayris Mongardi; Tessa Testicle: Catrin Feelings, Nyongbella; On the runway, category is Queen of Your Hometown. Catrin Feelings, Elle Vosque, and Paige Three receive positive critiques, with Elle Vosque winning the challenge. Nyongbella, Pasty, and Tayris Mongardi receive negative critiques, with Tayris Mongardi safe. The queens are then informed of "The Lucky Cow" twist, in which the bottom two queens will lip sync for their lives, and if they lose, they will be eliminated. However, back in the werkroom, the other queens will secretly vote for "The Lucky Cow", who is the bottom queen that the majority of their fellow competitors think should be saved from a final elimination. However, The Lucky Cow is not revealed until after the lip sync. Nyongbella and Pasty lip-sync to "Von Dutch" by Charli XCX. Nyongbella wins the lip-sync, however Pasty is then revealed to have been voted The Lucky Cow, so nobody is eliminated.: Guest Judge: Joel Dommett; Alternating Judge: Alan Carr; Main Challenge: Present a signature look at the Brit Gala and answer questions from Drag Race alumni; Runway Theme: Queen of Your Hometown; Challenge Winner: Elle Vosque; Bottom Two: Nyongbella and Pasty; Lip-Sync Song: "Von Dutch" by Charli XCX; Eliminated: None
60	2	"Rumble in the Jumble"	2 October 2025
For this week's The Traitors-themed mini-challenge, the queens must vote in the categories Most Distasteful: The Queen with The Sloppiest Drag, Most Beautiful: The Best-Looking Queen, Most Painful: The Biggest Pain in the Arse, Most Delightful: The Queen with The Best Vibe, and Most Fateful: Who Will Be Going Home Next. Pasty, Bones, Viola, Elle Vosque, and Pasty win each category, respectively. For the main challenge, the queens must split into pairs and produce looks using materials recycled from previous series of RuPaul's Drag Race UK. As the queen voted the most categories in the mini-challenge, Pasty must assign the materials: Series 1: Nyongbella and Tayris Mongardi; Series 2: Bonnie Ann Clyde and Elle Vosque; Series 3: Bones and Silllexa Diction; Series 4: Catrin Feelings and Pasty; Series 5: Chai T Grande and Sally™; Series 6: Paige Three and Viola; On the runway, Bones, Catrin Feelings, and Sally™ receive positive critiques, with Sally™ winning the challenge. Bonnie Ann Clyde, Pasty, and Viola receive negative critiques, with Bonnie Ann Clyde being safe. Pasty and Viola lip-sync to "Heartbreak (Make Me a Dancer)" by Freemasons and Sophie Ellis-Bextor. Viola wins the lip-sync and Pasty is the first queen to sashay away.: Guest Judge: Michelle de Swarte; Alternating Judge: Graham Norton; Mini-Challenge: The Tainters; Mini-Challenge Winner: Pasty, Bones, Viola, and Elle Vosque; Main Challenge: In pairs, create a look using materials from previous series of RuPaul's Drag Race UK; Runway Theme: Rumble in the Jumble Eleganza; Challenge Winner: Sally™; Bottom Two: Pasty and Viola; Lip-Sync Song: "Heartbreak (Make Me a Dancer)" by Freemasons and Sophie Ellis-Bextor; Eliminated: Pasty; Farewell Message: "NOT ME GOING HOME FIRST LOVE YOU GIRLS! See you soon! Pasties are on ME P♡xx"
61	3	"Battle of the Brats"	9 October 2025
For this week's main challenge, the queens write, record, and perform verses to "She Ate That".: Team F@LLEN ANG3LZ: Bonnie Ann Clyde, Catrin Feelings, Nyongbella, Paige Three, Tayris Mongardi, and Viola; Team Hotline X: Bones, Chai T Grande, Elle Vosque, Sally™, and Silllexa Diction; On the runway, category is Cuddly Wuddly. Bones, Paige Three, and Elle Vosque receive positive critiques, with Bones winning the challenge. Chai T Grande, Nyongbella, and Viola receive negative critiques, with Chai T Grande being safe. Nyongbella and Viola lip-sync to "Sound of the Underground" by Girls Aloud. Nyongbella wins the lip-sync and Viola sashays away.: Guest Judge: Nadine Coyle; Alternating Judge: Graham Norton; Main Challenge: Write, record, and perform verses to "She Ate That"; Runway Theme: Cuddly Wuddly; Challenge Winner: Bones; Bottom Two: Nyongbella and Viola; Lip-Sync Song: "Sound of the Underground" by Girls Aloud; Eliminated: Viola; Farewell Message: "Looks like there's one more fallen angel. I love the PANTS of every one of you ♡ MAKE ME PROUD! Vi"
62	4	"Sweety Darlings!"	16 October 2025
For this week's main challenge, the queens act in the three-part TV series based on traditional British novels, Mother Tuckers.: Episode 1 – Lucky Bitches: Bones, Elle Vosque, Paige Three, and Silllexa Diction; Episode 2 – Tucky Bitches: Bonnie Ann Clyde, Sally™, and Tayris Mongardi; Episode 3 – Mucky Bitches: Chai T Grande, Catrin Feelings, and Nyongbella; On the runway, category is Ab Fab – Night of a Thousand Sweety Darlings. Bonnie Ann Clyde, Catrin Feelings, and Sally™ receive positive critiques, with Bonnie Ann Clyde winning the challenge. Chai T Grande, Nyongbella, and Silllexa Diction receive negative critiques, with Chai T Grande being made safe. Nyongbella and Silllexa Diction lip-sync to "Pearls" by Jessie Ware. Silllexa Diction wins the lip-sync and Nyongbella sashays away.: Guest Judge: Jane Horrocks; Alternating Judge: Alan Carr; Main Challenge: Act in the three-part TV series Mother Tuckers; Runway Theme: Ab Fab – Night of a Thousand Sweety Darlings; Challenge Winner: Bonnie Ann Clyde; Bottom Two: Nyongbella and Silllexa Diction; Lip-Sync Song: "Pearls" by Jessie Ware; Eliminated: Nyongbella; Farewell Message: "KK, Love you all... Duhhhhh xoxo"
63	5	"Talent Ahoy!"	23 October 2025
For this week's main challenge, the queens will perform in a talent show on the SS Tickety Boo Cruise Liner.: Bones – Original song; Bonnie Ann Clyde – Original song; Catrin Feelings – Comedy magic routine; Chai T Grande – Comedy burlesque; Elle Vosque – Original song; Paige Three – Live singing and lip syncing; Sally™ – Comedy painting routine; Silllexa Diction – Comedy burlesque; Tayris Mongardi – Original song; On the runway, category is Having It Large. Elle Vosque, Silllexa Diction, and Tayris Mongardi receive positive critiques, with Silllexa Diction winning the challenge. Bones, Chai T Grande, and Paige Three receive negative critiques, with Paige Three being made safe. Bones and Chai T Grande lip-sync to "Spectrum (Say My Name)" by Florence and the Machine and Calvin Harris. Bones wins the lip-sync and Chai T Grande sashays away.: Guest Judge: Jamie-Lee O'Donnell; Alternating Judge: Alan Carr; Main Challenge: Perform a talent show on the SS Tickety Boo Cruise Liner; Runway Theme: Having It Large; Challenge Winner: Silllexa Diction; Bottom Two: Bones and Chai T Grande; Lip-Sync Song: "Spectrum (Say My Name)" by Florence and the Machine and Calvin Harris; Eliminated: Chai T Grande; Farewell Message: "Sawadee kaa! Thank you from the bottom of my heart for being there for me in this crazy experience. So happy we are bound together as sisters. Love you all. CTG on the BBC xoxo"
64	6	"Peter Pansy: The Rusical"	30 October 2025
For this week's main challenge, the queens perform in Peter Pansy: The Rusical.: Bones plays Granny; Bonnie Ann Clyde plays Captain Hooker; Catrin Feelings plays Croc Destroyer #2; Elle Vosque plays Wendy; Paige Three plays Peter Pansy; Sally™ plays Smeg; Silllexa Diction plays Stinker Bell; Tayris Mongardi plays Croc Destroyer #1; On the runway, category is Battle-Axe – Warrior Queen. Bones, Elle Vosque, and Paige Three receive positive critiques, with Elle Vosque and Paige Three winning the challenge. Sally™, Silllexa Diction, and Tayris Mongardi receive negative critiques, with Silllexa Diction being safe. Sally™ and Tayris Mongardi lip-sync to "Don't Rain on My Parade" by Shirley Bassey. Tayris Mongardi wins the lip-sync and Sally™ sashays away.: Guest Judge: Mazz Murray; Alternating Judge: Graham Norton; Main Challenge: Peter Pansy: The Rusical; Runway Theme: Battle-Axe – Warrior Queen; Challenge Winner: Elle Vosque and Paige Three; Bottom Two: Sally™ and Tayris Mongardi; Lip-Sync Song: "Don't Rain on My Parade" by Shirley Bassey; Eliminated: Sally™; Farewell Message: "THANK YOU'S FOR MAKING ME FEEL LIKE A STAR!! (drawing of face) SALLY TM xoxo ♡"
65	7	"Snatch Me Out!"	6 November 2025
For this week's mini-challenge, the queens read each other to filth. Bones wins the mini-challenge. For the main challenge, the queens play the Snatch Game. Jordan North stars as the celebrity contestant. The cast consisted of: Bones as Liam Gallagher; Bonnie Ann Clyde as Cher (as a chair); Catrin Feelings as Bonnie Tyler; Elle Vosque as JoJo Siwa; Paige Three as Amazon Alexa; Silllexa Diction as Zoë Wanamaker (as Lady Cassandra from Doctor Who); Tayris Mongardi as Matt Lucas (as Precious Little from Come Fly with Me); On the runway, category is Holiday Ho Ho Hos. Bonnie Ann Clyde, Catrin Feelings, and Elle Vosque receive positive critiques, with Bonnie Ann Clyde winning the challenge. Bones, Paige Three, and Silllexa Diction receive negative critiques, with Silllexa Diction being safe. Bones and Paige Three lip-sync to "Tainted Love" by Soft Cell. Bones wins the lip-sync and Paige Three sashays away.: Guest Judge: Susan Wokoma; Alternating Judge: Alan Carr; Mini-Challenge: Reading is Fundamental; Mini-Challenge Winner: Bones; Main Challenge: Snatch Game; Runway Theme: Holiday Ho Ho Hos; Challenge Winner: Bonnie Ann Clyde; Bottom Two: Bones and Paige Three; Lip-Sync Song: "Tainted Love" by Soft Cell; Eliminated: Paige Three; Farewell Message: TBA
66	8	"The Hun Makeover"	13 November 2025
For this week's main challenge, the queens makeover a celebrity hun into a member of their drag family. The pairs are: Bones and Charlotte Church, Bonnie Ann Clyde and David Potts, Catrin Feelings and Diane Parish, Elle Vosque and Michelle McManus, Silllexa Diction and Shobna Gulati, and Tayris Mongardi and Dani Harmer. On the runway, category is 100% Drag Family Resemblance. Bones and Silllexa Diction receive positive critiques, with Bones winning the challenge. Bonnie Ann Clyde, Catrin Feelings, Elle Vosque, and Tayris Mongardi receive negative critiques, with Elle Vosque and Tayris Mongardi being safe. Bonnie Ann Clyde and Catrin Feelings lip-sync to "Push the Button" by Sugababes. Catrin Feelings wins the lip-sync and Bonnie Ann Clyde sashays away.: Guest Judge: Mutya Buena; Alternating Judge: Graham Norton; Main Challenge: Makeover celebrity huns into members of the queens' drag family; Runway Theme: 100% Drag Family Resemblance; Challenge Winner: Bones; Bottom Two: Bonnie Ann Clyde and Catrin Feelings; Lip-Sync Song: "Push the Button" by Sugababes; Eliminated: Bonnie Ann Clyde; Farewell Message: TBA
67	9	"Comedy is a Bitch"	20 November 2025
For this week's main challenge, the queens perform a roast of their fellow competitors and the eliminated queens in the "Karma is a Bitch" roast. On the runway, category is English Country Garden Realness. Bones, Silllexa Diction and Elle Vosque receive positive critiques, with Bones winning the challenge. Catrin Feelings and Tayris Mongardi receive negative critiques. Catrin Feelings and Tayris Mongardi then lip-sync to "Mamma Knows Best" by Jessie J. Catrin Feelings wins the lip-sync and Tayris Mongardi sashays away.: Guest Judge: Sophie Willan; Alternating Judge: Alan Carr; Main Challenge: Perform a roast of their fellow competitors and the eliminated queens of Series 7; Runway Theme: English Country Garden Realness; Challenge Winner: Bones; Bottom Two: Catrin Feelings and Tayris Mongardi; Lip-Sync Song: "Mamma Knows Best" by Jessie J; Eliminated: Tayris Mongardi; Farewell Message: TBA
68	10	"Sing for the Crown"	27 November 2025
For the final challenge, the queens write, record, and perform their own verses to the original song, "Money Shot". On the runway, category is Epic Eleganza. The eliminated queens all return to the runway, where it is announced that Chai T Grande is this season's Miss Congeniality. Catrin Feelings and Silllexa Diction are eliminated, leaving Bones and Elle Vosque as the top two queens of the season. They lip-sync to "You Make Me Feel (Mighty Real)" by Jimmy Somerville. It is announced that Bones is the winner, leaving Elle Vosque as the runner-up.: Alternating Judges: Alan Carr and Graham Norton; Main Challenge: Write, record, and perform their own verses to the original song "Money Shot"; Runway Theme: Epic Eleganza; Miss Congeniality: Chai T Grande; Eliminated: Catrin Feelings and Silllexa Diction; Final Two: Bones and Elle Vosque; Lip-Sync Song: "You Make Me Feel (Mighty Real)" by Jimmy Somerville; Runner-up: Elle Vosque; Winner of RuPaul's Drag Race UK Series Seven: Bones
