= RuPaul's Drag Race UK =

British reality competition television series (since 2019)

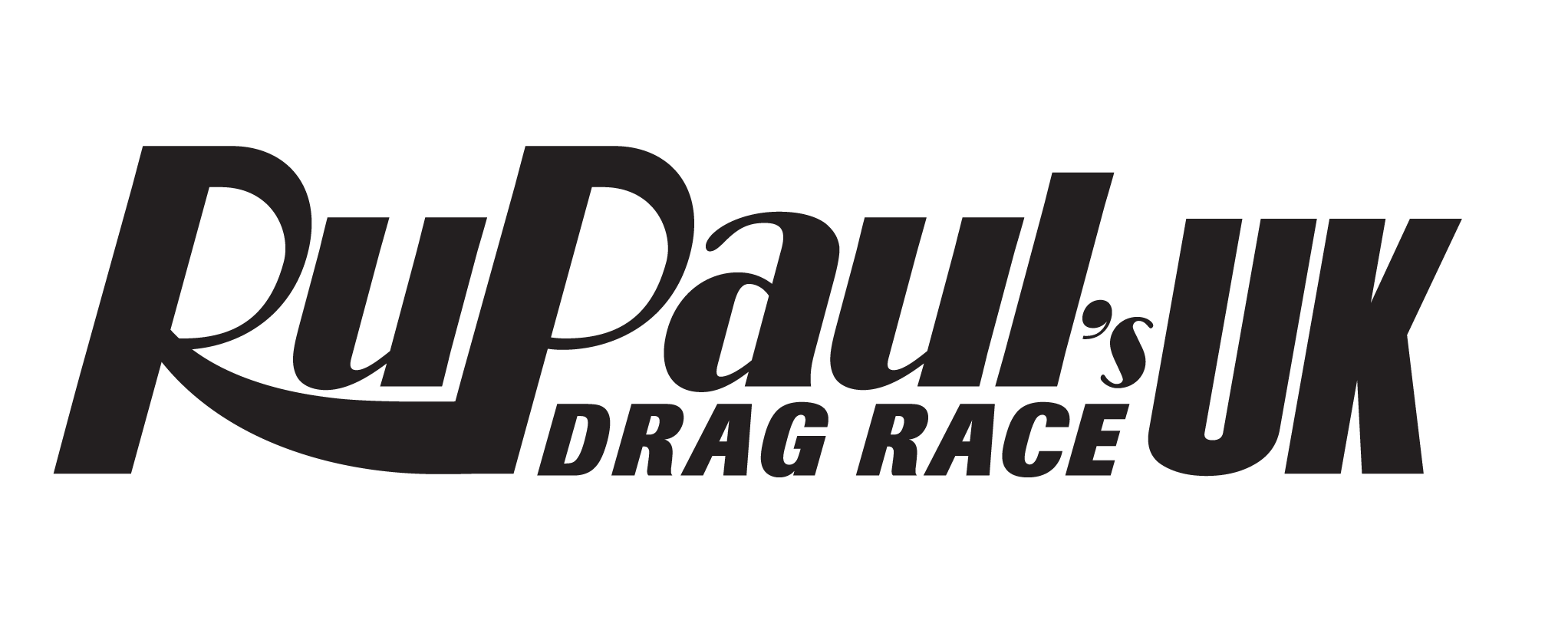
- Genre: Reality competition
- Directed by: Tony Grech-Smith
- Presented by: RuPaul
- Starring: RuPaul's Drag Race UK contestants
- Judges: RuPaul; Michelle Visage; Alan Carr; Graham Norton
- Theme music composer: RuPaul
- Opening theme: RuPaul's Drag Race theme
- Ending theme: "Rock It (To the Moon)"
- Country of origin: United Kingdom
- Original language: English
- No. of series: 8
- No. of episodes: 78 (list of episodes)

Production
- Executive producers: Bruce McCoy; Sally Sanders; RuPaul Charles; Fenton Bailey; Randy Barbato; Tom Campbell
- Producer: Michelle Visage
- Production locations: 3 Mills Studios (Note: series 1); Pinewood Studios (Note: series 2, 4–8); Manchester Studios (Note: series 3)
- Camera setup: Multi-camera
- Running time: 60–70 minutes
- Production company: World of Wonder

Original release
- Network: BBC Three; BBC One; WOW Presents Plus
- Release: 3 October 2019 – 5 November 2026

Related
- RuPaul's Drag Race; God Shave the Queens; RuPaul's Drag Race: UK vs. the World

RuPaul's Drag Race UK is a British reality competition television series based on the American television series of the same name. The television series, a collaboration between the BBC and World of Wonder, premiered on 3 October 2019. The show is the fourth installment of the Drag Race franchise, and the second fronted by RuPaul. The show documents RuPaul and a panel of judges' search for "the United Kingdom's next drag superstar", the first series title dubbed "UK's First Drag Superstar". RuPaul plays several roles on the show including host, mentor and head judge for the series, as the contestants are given different challenges to participate in each week. The show also employs a panel of judges: RuPaul, Michelle Visage, Alan Carr, and Graham Norton.

The show was renewed for a second series in 2019; however, production was suspended in March 2020 due to the COVID-19 pandemic. Production of the second series resumed later in the year, with filming concluding in late 2020. The cast of 12 new queens was announced on 16 December 2020 and the series premiered on 14 January 2021. The show was renewed for a third (2021), fourth (2022) and fifth (2023) series. After the first series aired, the show received numerous award nominations from the twenty-fifth National Television Awards including: "The Bruce Forsyth Entertainment Award" and "Best TV Judge" with both Visage and RuPaul receiving a nomination.

The show was critically acclaimed in the UK, with 15.6 million streams during the first season. The show's success is credited for being the driving force behind the BBC bringing back the defunct television channel BBC Three. Spin-off show RuPaul's Drag Race: UK vs. the World relaunched the television channel in February 2022. The return proved successful, with the show securing five times more viewers than any other show broadcasting during the channel's first day. The show is now recognised as one of the BBC's most popular non-scripted shows. The show's success has also paved way for contestants to break into the music industry, as well as creating drag pop groups: Frock Destroyers and United Kingdolls, with both groups charting on the Official UK Charts. Bimini Bon-Boulash, who was a member of the latter group, was the first drag queen from any Drag Race franchise to sign a major mainstream record deal, signing a joint deal with Relentless Records and Sony Music in July 2022. A number of contestants from the show have also signed major modelling contracts. The show also produced spin-off series God Shave the Queens, which follows the Drag Race contestants on tour together after the completion of the show. The show's success also resulted in the BBC purchasing broadcasting rights for both Canada's Drag Race and RuPaul's Drag Race Down Under.

== History ==
RuPaul's Drag Race originated in the United States and has been adapted in various countries. The show's aim is to find the next "Drag Superstar", with the winner occupying the traits of "charisma", "uniqueness", "nerve" and "talent". RuPaul has stated that the show looks for an entertainer who can stand out from the rest. Whereas Fenton Bailey has stated that: "Everyone can relate to the feeling of being an outsider".

In 2014, it was speculated that Jonathan Ross was in talks to host a UK version of Drag Race. Where he had stated that he was working on the version with UK drag queen, Jodie Harsh, along with Katie Price as one of the judges. However, production took a halt in April 2014, due to Ross having to work on family issues. A year later in 2015, Ross and Price assisted RuPaul in a one-off search of the "UK Drag Race Ambassador", which eventual Series 1 winner, The Vivienne won in 2015. The Vivienne won a trip to the set of the American version of the show.

During Michelle Visage's time on Celebrity Big Brother, she said; "I tell you what, I could cast RuPaul's Drag Race the British invasion or the UK version in five minutes because there's so much talent over there. It's so different, the Liverpool queens, to the Blackpool queens, to the Mancunian queens, to the London queens. I'm not going to stop until [RuPaul's Drag Race UK] gets made. Trust me." Channel 5 expressed interest in broadcasting the show in 2018. However, in June 2018, the producers of the American version hinted that a British version of the show was in the works. Fenton Bailey then confirmed that he, Randy Barbato and RuPaul had a meeting with the BBC and that "something is coming, be afraid – be very afraid. Nothing's impossible."

Visage said about her driving force to get a UK version made: "Let me tell you I'm a big driving force behind it happening because I came over here like six or seven years ago and started performing in the gay bars. And I saw the love and the passion for Drag Race and that's the reason I did Celebrity Big Brother five years ago, was to bring attention to it. I knew that the LGBTQIA+ community in the UK needed their own version. These kids craved it, they deserved it. So, I fought really hard for this British version to happen. It took five years, but it ended up where it belonged at the BBC of all places. And it was a huge hit because there's so much heart and so much love in the UK for the art of drag." The show was commissioned by Fiona Campbell, Controller BBC Three and Kate Phillips, Controller, BBC Entertainment. The executive producers are RuPaul Charles, Fenton Bailey, Randy Barbato, Tom Campbell, Sally Miles and Bruce McCoy, and the BBC commissioning editor is Ruby Kuraishe. Bailey credits the show as a turning point, because it helped demonstrate the show's universality.

On 9 September 2026, it was announced that the BBC had axed RuPaul's Drag Race UK, and its partner series RuPaul's Drag Race UK vs the World, amidst budget cuts from the BBC. [21] That same day, WOW Presents Plus announced it was commissioning the first series of RuPaul's Drag Race UK All Stars, becoming the fifth series of the Drag Race franchise to have its own All Stars (following the US, Spain, France and Canada).

== Format ==
Like the American version, RuPaul has several roles within the show, acting as host, coach and judge. As the host, RuPaul introduces celebrity guests, announces the challenges the queens will take part in each week, and reveals who will be leaving the competition. For his role as a coach, RuPaul offers guidance to the contestants through each challenge, and as a judge, he critiques the queens on their overall performance of the challenge. The show uses progressive elimination to reduce the number of drag queens in the competition from the initial field of ten contestants (series 1), down until the final three, who compete in the final challenge, and the final two lip-syncing for the crown. Each episode follows a format consisting of a mini-challenge, a main challenge, a runway walk (where the contestants model fashion on a runway, usually with a theme based on the main challenge), the judging panel, a lip sync battle, and the elimination of a contestant. Most of the lip-syncs on the British version feature songs from UK-based or British recording artists.

Spin-off series RuPaul's Drag Race UK: The Podcast, presented by Scarlett Moffatt and Baby Lame, airs on BBC Sounds, with interviews with the queens who Sashay Away each week, as well as guests.

=== Mini challenges ===
In mini-challenges, each contestant is asked to perform a different task with varying requirements and time limitations. Certain mini-challenges are repeated from series to series, or repeated from the original American season. For instance, the first mini-challenge is a photo shoot with a photographer or RuPaul himself, that includes a special twist (such as being doused with water while in full drag, having a high-powered fan turned on during the shoot, or being photographed while jumping on a trampoline): in the UK version, the queens had to do something with their own heads via Green Screen. Another recurring mini-challenge is dedicated to "reading", a drag term for making insulting observations about one's peers for comedic effect, inspired by Paris Is Burning. The winner of a mini-challenge is sometimes rewarded with an advantage in the main challenge. Though most episodes have a mini-challenge, select episodes do not.

=== Maxi challenges and runways ===
The requirements of the maxi challenge vary across each episode and can be individual or group challenges. The winner of the maxi challenge also receives a special prize for their win, for example, a "RuPeter Badge" a spoof of the CBBC's famous Blue Peter badge, which would be received for doing something well. The final maxi challenge consisted of the queens taking part in an all-singing and all-dancing routine to one of RuPaul's songs.

The goal of each maxi challenge involves a new theme and outcome. Contestants are often asked to design and construct a custom outfit, sometimes incorporating unconventional materials. Other challenges focus on the contestants' ability to present themselves on camera, perform with music, or perform humorously. Some challenges became a tradition across series, such as the "Snatch Game" (in which the contestants impersonate celebrities in a recreation of Blankety Blank's US equivalent, Match Game), a ball or a makeover, in which the contestants create drag personas for other people. The contestants walk down a runway presenting outfits. If the maxi challenge involves the creation of an outfit, that outfit is presented to the judges on the runway. Otherwise, a theme is assigned and the contestants must put together a look that fits the theme, which is presented to the judges. The runway looks and presentation are judged along with the maxi challenge performance.

=== Judging panel ===
A panel of judges cast opinions about the challenge performances and runway looks, first to the contestants onstage, and then again with them offstage.

Judges on RuPaul's Drag Race UK
| Judge | Series | | | | | | | |
| Judge | 1 | 2 | 3 | 4 | 5 | 6 | 7 | 8 |
|---|---|---|---|---|---|---|---|---|
| RuPaul | Main | Main | Main | Main | Main | Main | Main | Main |
| Michelle Visage | Main | Main | Main | Main | Main | Main | Main | Main |
| Alan Carr | Main | Main | Main | Main | Main | Main | Main | Main |
| Graham Norton | Main | Main | Main | Main | Main | Main | Main | Main |

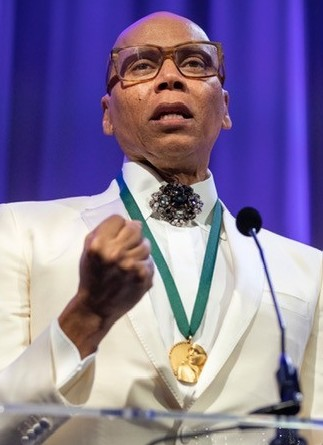
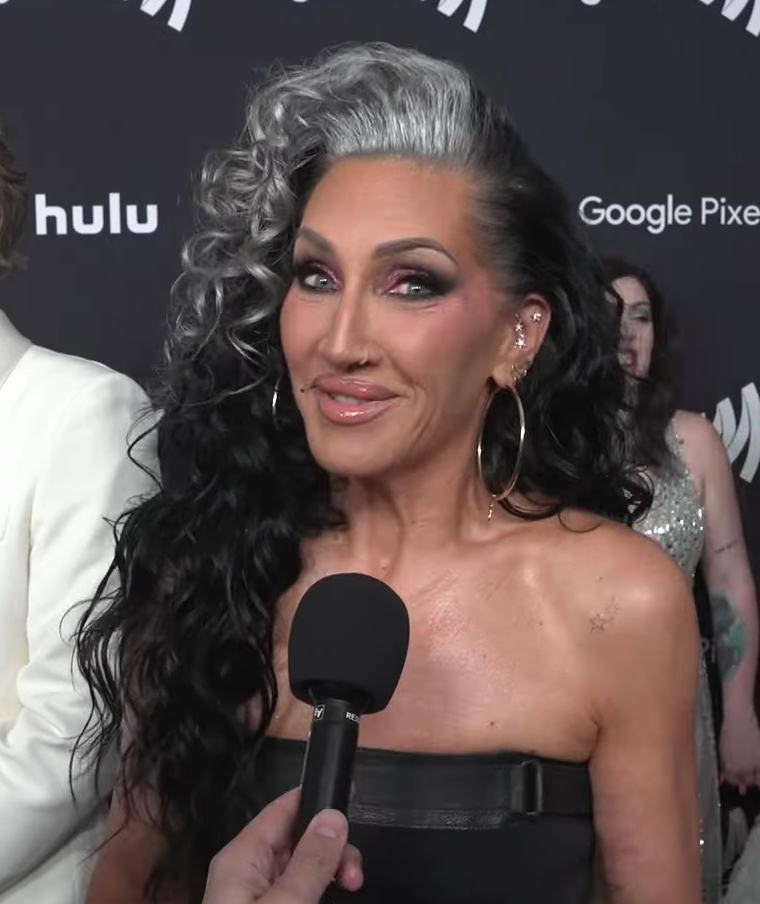
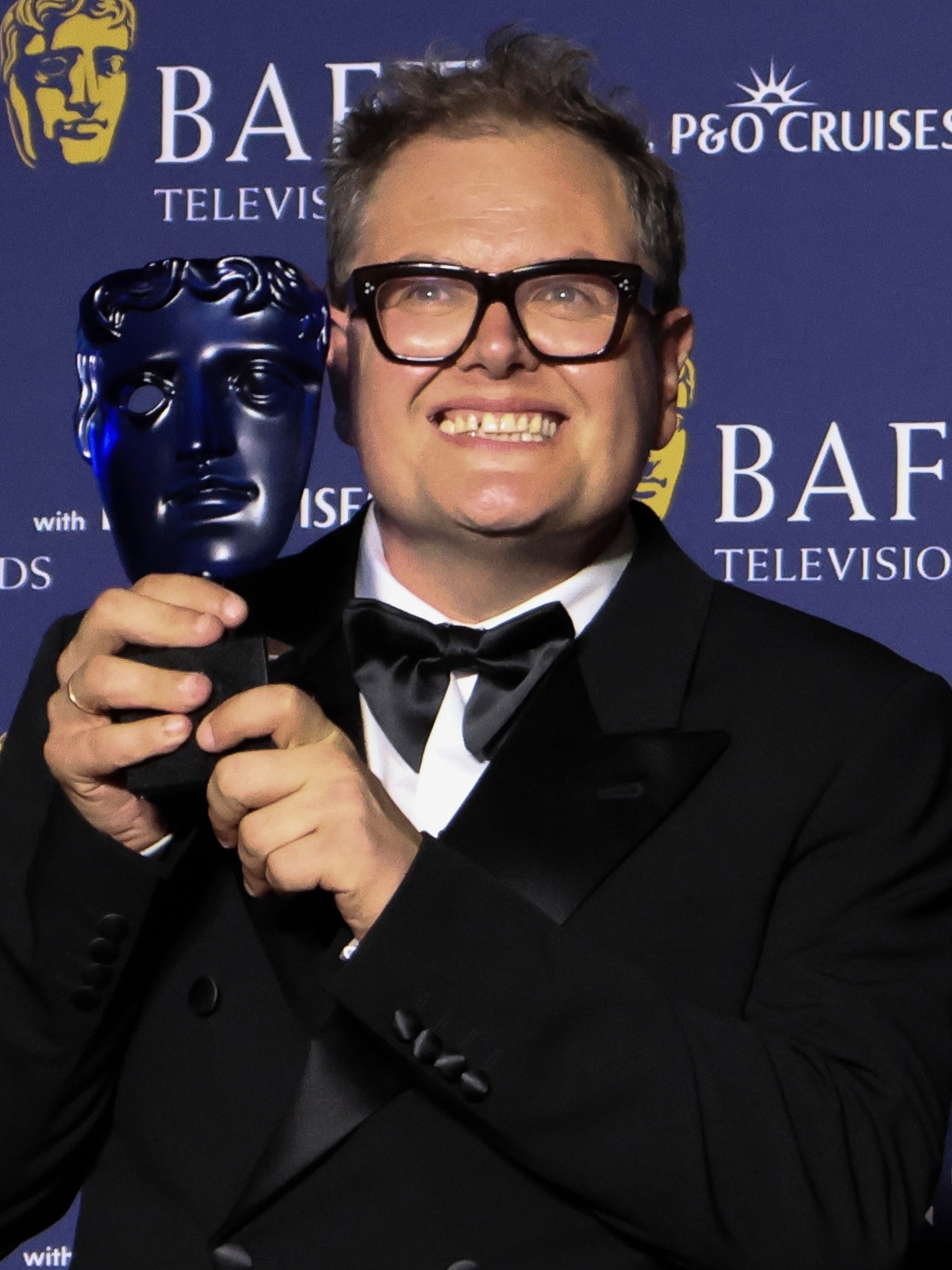
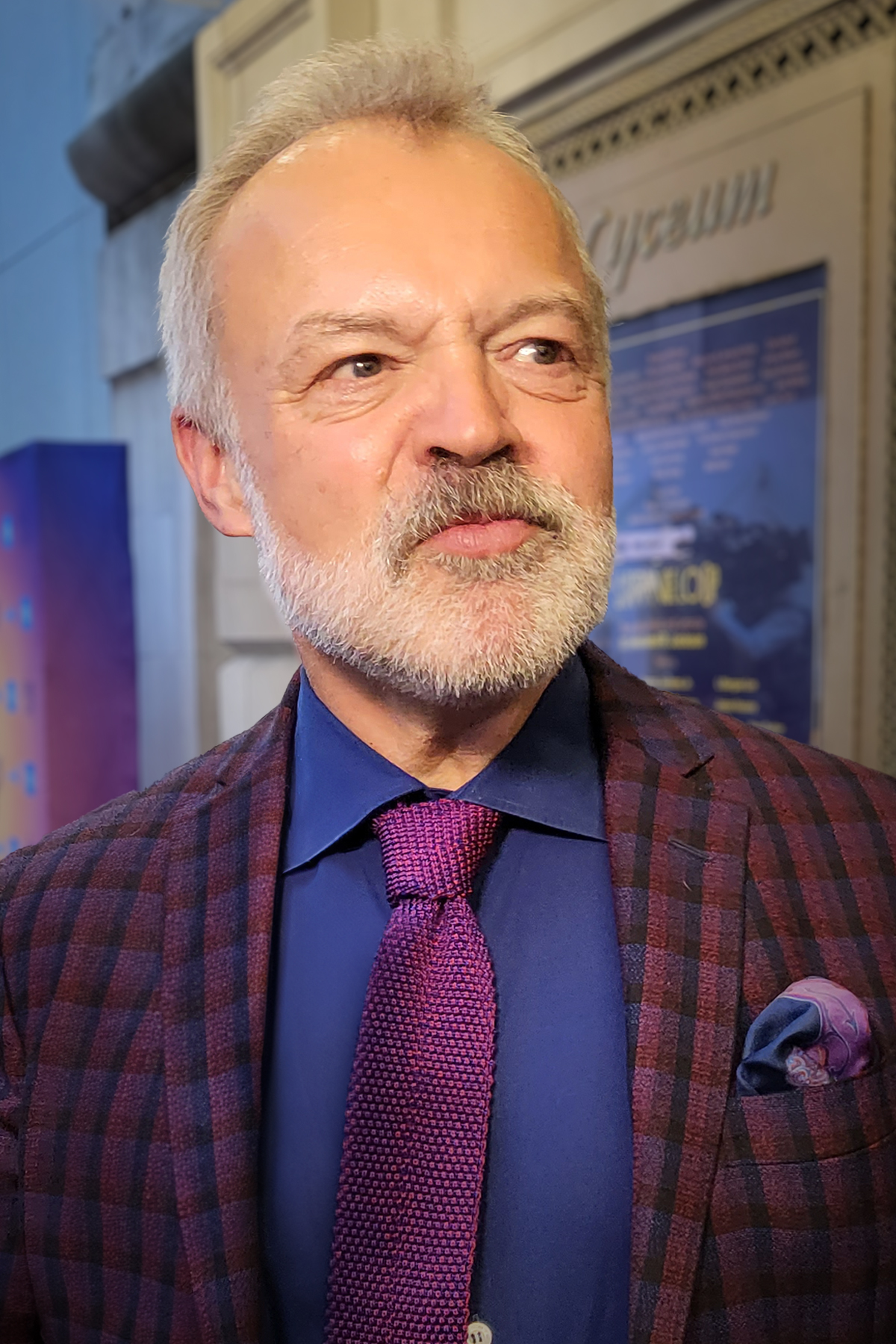
RuPaul (top left), Michelle Visage (top right), Alan Carr (bottom left), Graham Norton (bottom right), the judges of the show.

RuPaul, as with the original American version, acts as both the host and main judge, with Michelle Visage supporting him on the panel every episode. Graham Norton and Alan Carr are rotating supporting judges, with one of them usually appearing on the panel each episode, with the fourth slot filled by a new guest judge each episode. For the seventh episode of the fourth series, RuPaul was absent from the panel and Visage acted as stand-in host and main judge. In 2023, Norton, Carr, and Visage all returned to judge the fifth series of the show.

Guest judges in Series 1 included Maisie Williams, Geri Halliwell, Jade Thirlwall, Andrew Garfield, Michaela Coel, Cheryl, and Twiggy. MNEK and AJ & Curtis Pritchard served as guest vocalists and choreographers to the contestants during themed tasks. Dawn French revealed herself to be the first guest judge of the second series. She went on to reveal that the BBC had originally asked French to be a main judge on the first series. French said: "They did originally ask me if I would be a full-time judge, but I couldn't – because I just don't live in London. But I am going to be a guest judge in a couple of weeks." She further revealed that for the second series, due to COVID-19, that each of the judges would sit on their own panel, instead of sitting together on one panel. As well as a "sort of Perspex between each judge".

Series 4 guest judges were revealed on 31 August 2022 to include: Olly Alexander, Boy George, Alison Hammond, Mel B, Dame Joanna Lumley, Lorraine Pascale, Leomie Anderson, FKA Twigs, Hannah Waddingham, and former RuPaul's Drag Race contestant Raven. Carol Vorderman was revealed as the celebrity guest for the fifth series in February 2023. Alexandra Burke was revealed to feature during the Snatch Game episode as a guest judge. Burke said of her experience as a guest judge: "I had the best time ever being a part of the iconic Snatch Game. I'm the biggest fan of RuPaul and the show. I've been desperate to appear on Drag Race, and so to be there was a real honour and I'm dreaming of being able to do it again and again!" Other guest judges were revealed to be Aisling Bea, Cush Jumbo, Yasmin Finney, Joel Dommett and Suranne Jones. Sophie Ellis-Bextor was also revealed to be a guest judge. Series 6 guest judges included: Claire Richards of Steps, Simon Le Bon of Duran Duran, Siobhán McSweeney, Beverley Knight, Mabel and AJ Odudu.

== Series overview ==
| Series | Contestants | Episodes | Originally released | | Winner | Runner(s)-up | Miss Congeniality |
| Series | Contestants | Episodes | First released | Last released | Winner | Runner(s)-up | Miss Congeniality |
|---|---|---|---|---|---|---|---|
| 1 | 10 | 8 | 3 October 2019 | 21 November 2019 | The Vivienne | Divina de Campo | —N/a |
| 2 | 12 | 10 | 14 January 2021 | 18 March 2021 | Lawrence Chaney | Bimini Bon-Boulash; Tayce | —N/a |
| 3 | 12 | 10 | 23 September 2021 | 25 November 2021 | Krystal Versace | Ella Vaday; Kitty Scott-Claus | —N/a |
| 4 | 12 | 10 | 22 September 2022 | 24 November 2022 | Danny Beard | Cheddar Gorgeous | —N/a |
| 5 | 10 | 10 | 28 September 2023 | 30 November 2023 | Ginger Johnson | Michael Marouli | —N/a |
| 6 | 12 | 10 | 26 September 2024 | 28 November 2024 | Kyran Thrax | La Voix | Charra Tea |
| 7 | 12 | 10 | 25 September 2025 | 27 November 2025 | Bones | Elle Vosque | Chai T Grande |
| 8 | 12 | 10 | 3 September 2026 | 5 November 2026 | Flesh | Mocha; Naya Thorn | Paris Baby |

=== Series 1–3 (2019–2021): BBC Three iPlayer ===
The first series of RuPaul's Drag Race UK began airing on 3 October 2019 on the BBC Three section of BBC iPlayer in the UK and World of Wonder's WOW Presents Plus streaming service internationally, and ran for 8 episodes. The cast was announced on 21 August on YouTube and Instagram. Baga Chipz, Divina de Campo and The Vivienne made the final, with The Vivienne being crowned the UK's First Drag Superstar and heading to Hollywood to star in their own digital TV series. In October 2020, Series 1 contestant, Crystal sued Laurence Fox for defamation after he called them a "paedophile" on social media as he ranted at Sainsbury's for supporting Black Lives Matter. It was revealed that the contestants from Series 1 would all star in a documentary web television series about the tour following the first series of RuPaul's Drag Race UK. The show originally premiered internationally on 10 September 2020 on WOW Presents Plus and will debut on BBC iPlayer on 15 November 2020. The eight-episode series follows RuPaul's Drag Race UK Series 1 contestants and it also features Alyssa Edwards from Season 5 of the American version as the host of the six-city tour across the UK, titled God Shave the Queens. The first series was a massive success generating many memes, huge critical acclaim, picking up numerous award nominations, and even breaking into the music charts with a top ten single, series one of RuPaul's Drag Race UK was a triumph for BBC Three, with a huge 15.6 million requests on iPlayer so far.

It's also good for some of the drag queens who maybe their sewing wasn't that good – because in the lockdown, if they've got any sense, they'd be on that sewing machine, with that pedal down! No excuse.

— Alan Carr during an interview with Lorraine Kelly

The second series of RuPaul's Drag Race UK was confirmed and casting was closed on 15 November 2019. Filming was indefinitely suspended because of the COVID-19 pandemic. In June 2020, Visage confirmed that the show would return once government guidelines were lifted. Visage said: "It's gonna happen but we just can't do it in quarantine. So once the guidelines are lifted then we'll have more information but we are excited to get underway." On 29 October 2020, during an interview on Lorraine, Carr revealed that production had begun again and he was due to resume filming the second series of the show within two weeks. Carr revealed that RuPaul and Visage who go through the application auditions to choose which queens will make it onto the show, had more than double the applicants than the first series. Carr also revealed that he never knows who he is going to be on the show with, as it is so secretive and when he turns up to judge the show, he does not know which queens are still in the competition and who will be the guest judges. He said of his excitement of filming the show; "They've already filmed the first one. I can't wait. I'm going to be like that kid in that Alton Towers advert saying, One more sleep!" During an interview on judge Norton's show, The Graham Norton Show, Dawn French revealed herself to be the first guest judge of the series. French revealed that the panel had now been changed to a socially distanced panel, and each of the judges had to sit at their own smaller panel, as opposed to the usual sitting together. French further revealed that the BBC had originally asked her to be a full-time judge for the first series, however she had to decline because she did not live in London and would mean a lot of travelling for her. In November 2020, BBC revealed that series two would air in early 2021. A spokesperson for the BBC said, "Our lips are still sealed with regards to the incoming queens, and extra special celebrity judges, BUT we can tell you that the second series will be even bigger than the first, with twelve queens battling it out for the title of the UK's Next Drag Superstar over ten weeks." There will be 12 queens competing for the title of "UK's Next Drag Superstar", over 10 episodes. RuPaul revealed he was "Looking forward to better days! I'm happy to announce the triumphant return of RuPaul's Drag Race UK. Early in 2021, season two will arrive with all the hope, joy, laughter and glitter you've come to expect from our brilliant queens. We're also currently casting season three with the best and the brightest Great Britain has to offer. We feel honored that you've embraced our little show, and our only wish is that we can offer a smile at a time when we can all use it the most." It was announced on 15 December 2020, that the second series would premier on 14 January 2021. Gemma Collins was revealed to be a panellist on the Snatch Game episode. Unlike Series 1, four queens made it to the finale with Lawrence Chaney being crowned the winner, and Bimini Bon-Boulash and Tayce as runners-up.

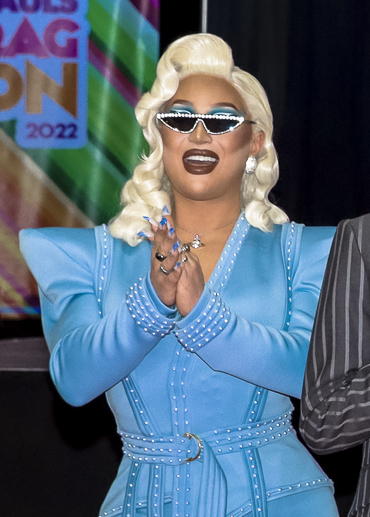
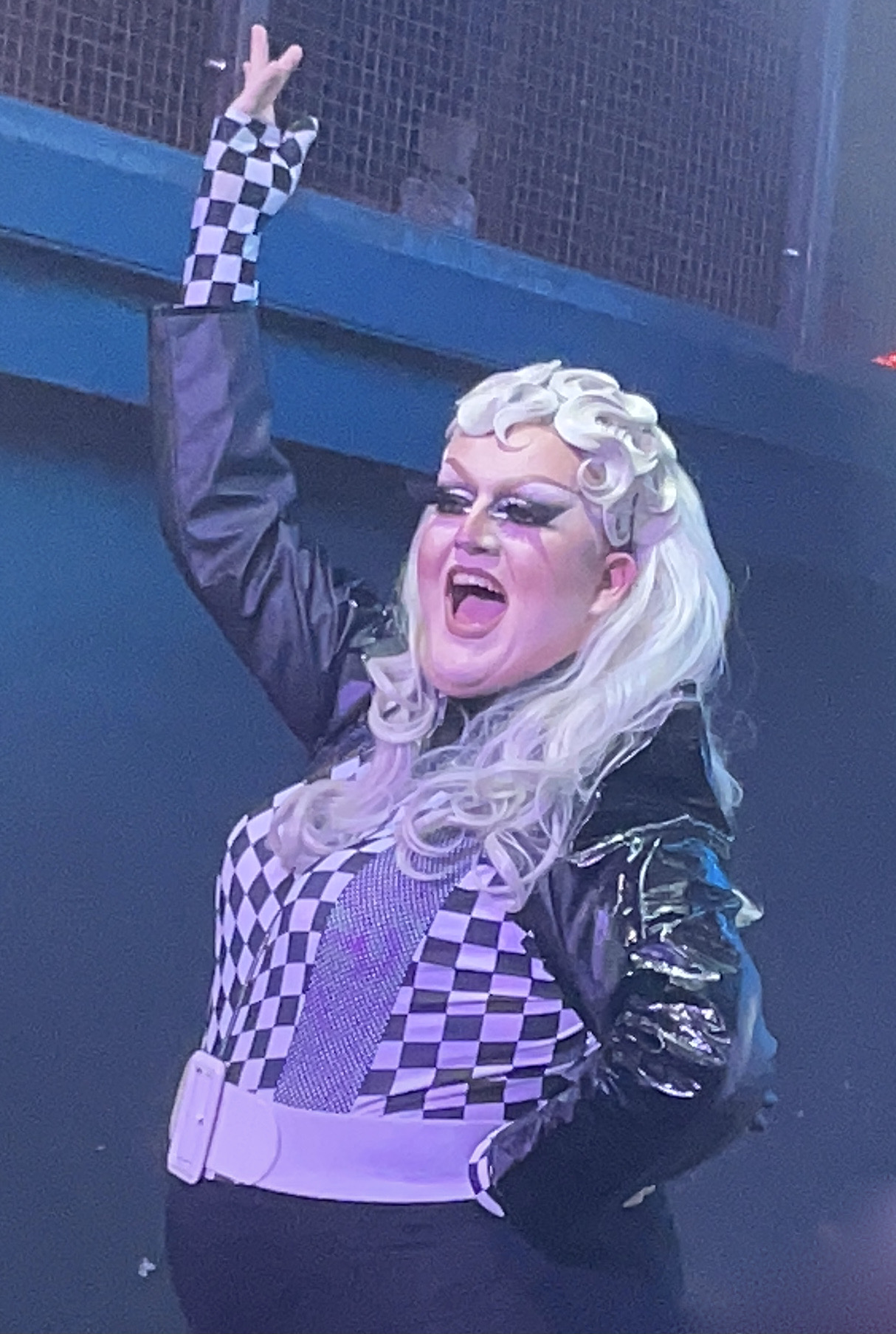
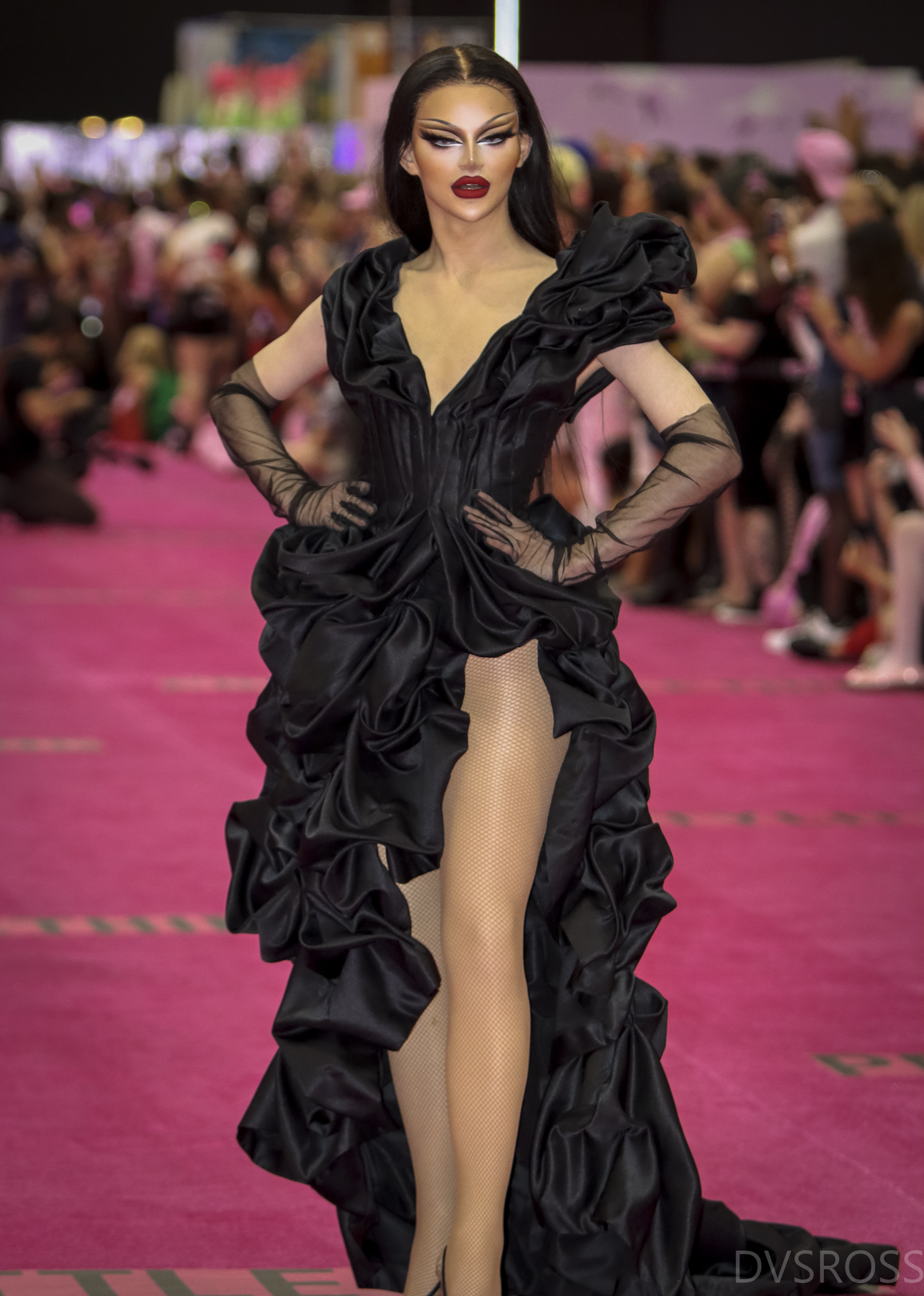
The Vivienne (left), Lawrence Chaney (centre), Krystal Versace (right), the winners of Series 1, 2, and 3, respectively

Fenton Bailey and Randy Barbato, World of Wonder Co-Founders and Executive Producers, revealed that 2021 would have two series of RuPaul's Drag Race UK. Stating: "Sashay away 2020. 2021 is just around the corner, and with it not one but two seasons of RuPaul's Drag Race UK. We are thrilled to be doing our part to make 2021 much betta!" Casting for the third series opened on 2 November 2020. One of the queens confirmed to compete is Veronica Green, who was promised an open invitation to return to the show after having to leave Series 2 due to a positive COVID-19 diagnosis. The series began airing on 23 September, and concluded on 25 November 2021. Ella Vaday, Kitty Scott-Claus and Krystal Versace made it to the final episode, with Krystal Versace winning the third series. It was the last series to aired on BBC One as BBC Three block before the return of BBC Three as a television channel. In October 2021, BBC Three announced the opening for the casting of the fourth series. Casting closed on 10 November 2021. Series 3 contestant, Victoria Scone, who had to withdraw from the series announced she would not return to the fourth series despite receiving an open invitation. RuPaul's Drag Race UK was nominated for two 2022 British Academy Television Awards including, "Must-See Moment" and "Best Reality and Constructed Factual Series".

Series 1 contestants Blu Hydrangea, Baga Chipz and Cheryl Hole partook in the spin-off series RuPaul's Drag Race: UK vs the World in 2022, which relaunched BBC Three as a television channel on 1 February 2022. The series was filmed in March 2021, in Manchester at the same location as the third series of the show. In this series, the two best performing queens of the challenge must "Lip Sync for the World", with the winner of the lip sync earning a golden "RuPeter Badge" and choosing which one of the bottom queens to eliminate. Blu Hydrangea emerged as the winner from the series, with RuPaul's Drag Race Season 10 and All Stars Season 4 contestant Mo Heart as the runner-up. The series premiered with impressive viewing figures drawing in 1 million live viewers.

=== Series 4–8 (2022–2026): BBC Three ===
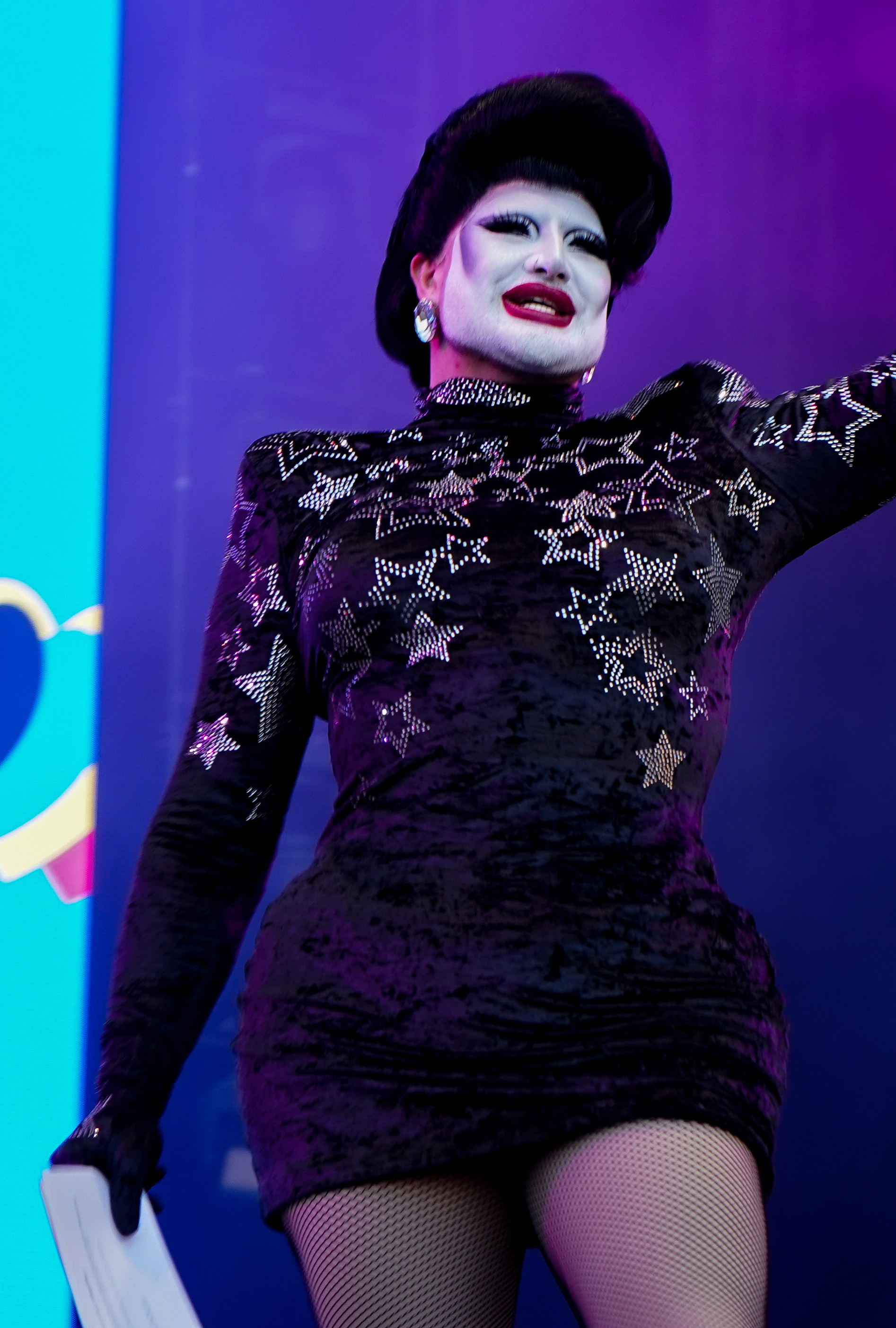
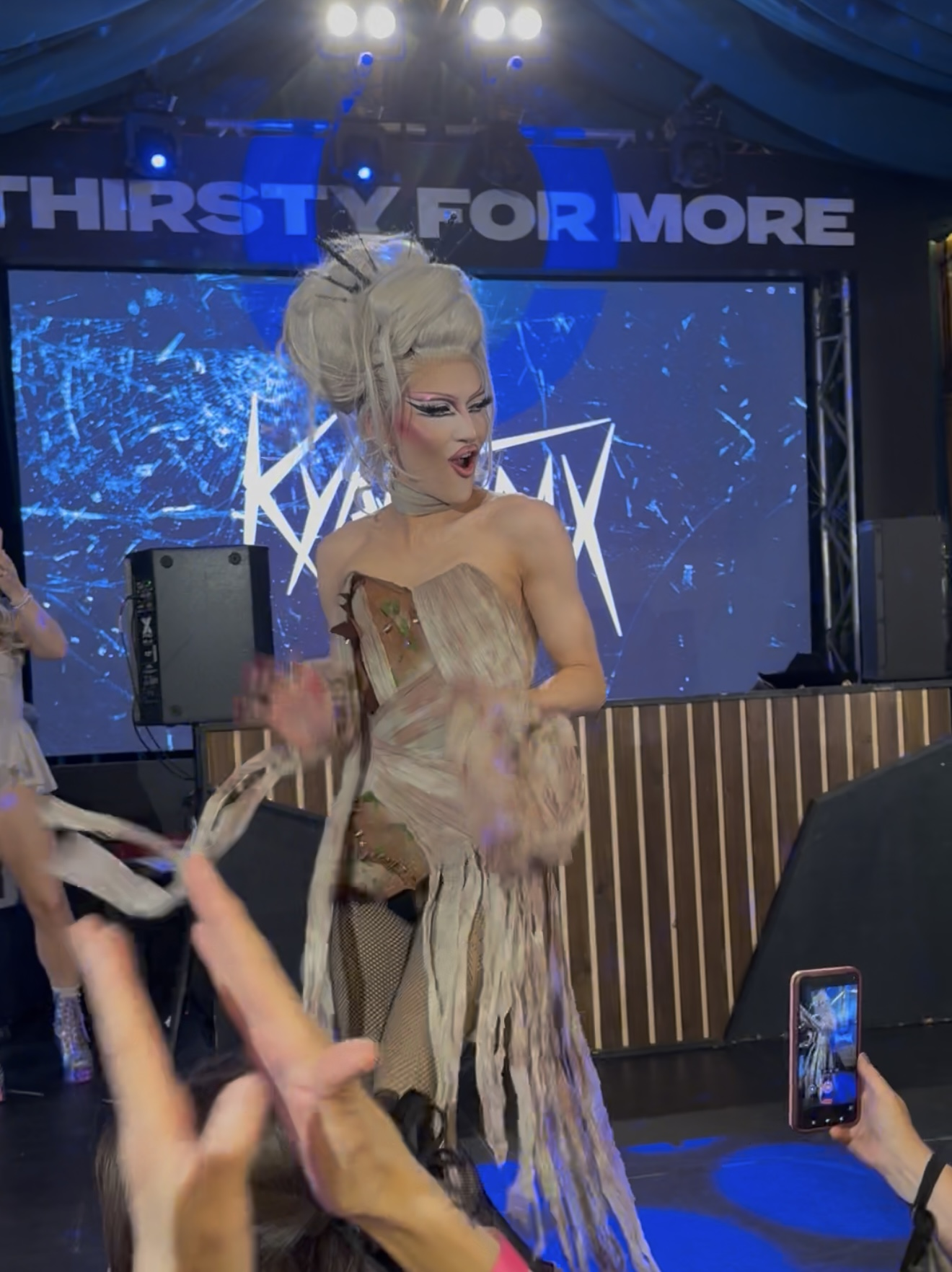
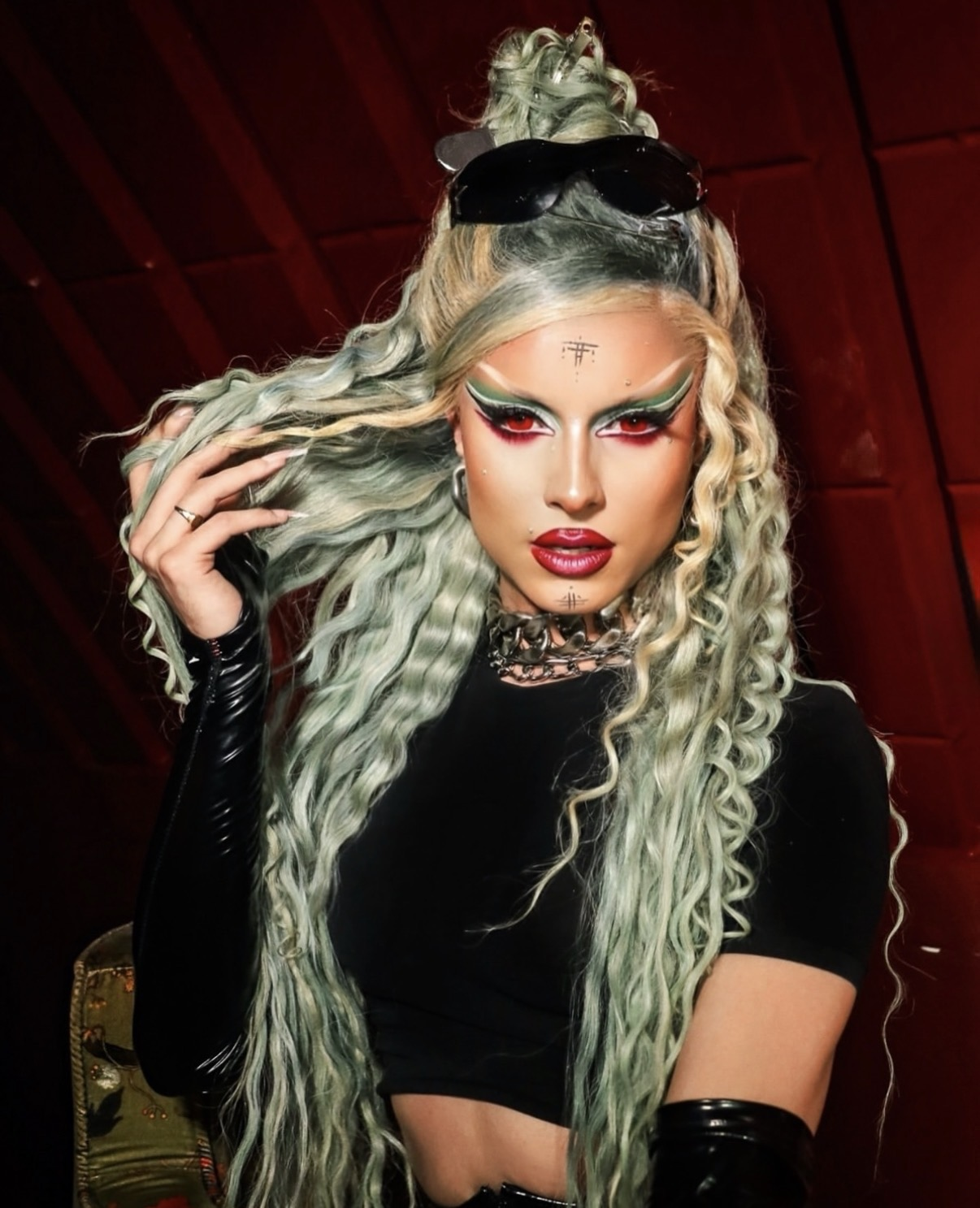
Danny Beard (left), Kyran Thrax (centre), and Bones (right), the winners of Series 4, 6, and 7, respectively

On 27 October 2021, it was announced via the show's official Instagram page that casting for Series 4 was now open. The deadline and casting close date was 10 November 2021. Sex Education star Hannah Waddingham was the first celebrity guest judge revealed to appear on the fourth series. Waddingham revealed she would be featured as a guest judge on the show during an episode of Jimmy Kimmel Live! which RuPaul was the celebrity guest host. Waddingham disclosed; "I'm a guest judge on RuPaul's Drag Race UK. I mean, I was giddy as all hell about that. Michelle [Visage] will tell you, I was like: 'Can't believe I'm here'". Judge Graham Norton revealed in an interview with Gay Times that the competitors that appeared on the fourth series were "some of the best queens we’ve ever seen". Norton said because the series was a post-COVID-19 season, the queens had a lot more freedom. Norton said, "It was very hard for the [season three] queens in COVID because they weren't making any money and lots of the dressmakers had stopped working. I think it was really hard during COVID, so this is definitely a post-COVID season and it's great. You can look forward to it. You don't need to worry!" BBC's chief executive's confirmed that the fourth season will be part of the autumn schedule, likely to begin airing in September. Mel B was revealed to be a guest judge on the series. Alison Hammond and Tess Daly were also confirmed to be making a cameo appearance. On 30 August 2022, BBC revealed a teaser of the show with the slogan "Bring it to the RUNW4Y". The following day, BBC confirmed the celebrity guest judges for the season would include: Dame Joanna Lumley, Boy George, Leomie Anderson, Olly Alexander, FKA Twigs, Lorraine Pascale and Hammond would in fact feature as a celebrity guest judge and not feature as a cameo appearance. Giovanni Pernice was announced as the shows resident choreographer for the season. Aisling Bea will also make a cameo appearance during the comedy challenge. Lumley stated: "It thrills me to be a part of RuPaul's Drag Race UK. The show is astounding at every level, and I loved it from the very start. RuPaul is the definition of what it is to be fabulous, and the show is packed with mad creativity, humour, and drop-dead glamour." Whereas Boy George stated: "Drag Race is such a phenomena [sic] and it has unleashed intense creativity and debate. RuPaul has made the concept of drag into a household name! I'm part of the drag daisy chain. Every nice drag queen is my sister and the rest are second cousins! It was a lot of fun being part of the show." It was later revealed that Daly and AJ Odudu would feature during the Snatch Game episode. The BBC subsequently revealed the premiere date for fourth series would be 22 September 2022. By September 2022, RuPaul's Drag Race UK had recorded 51 million stream requests in the United Kingdom, becoming one of the network's most successful shows. On 2 September 2022, BBC announced the renewal of the show for a fifth series and casting was open, and would remain open for two weeks until 16 September. The competitors for the fourth series were revealed on 7 September 2022 on social media. The cast also featured Dakota Schiffer, the first openly transgender contestant to compete in the British version of the show. RuPaul was absent during the seventh episode of the fourth series, therefore Visage took place as main judge and host, whilst Raven took Visage's spot on the judging panel. It subsequently made it the first episode RuPaul had missed from across all the Drag Race universe hosted by RuPaul himself. Coincidentally, it made Raven the first former Drag Race contestant to judge on a RuPaul fronted franchise.

On 23 September 2022, the BBC reported that Series 2 contestant, Cherry Valentine, had died at the age of 28. Cherry Valentine's family released the following statement: "It is with the most heart wrenching and deepest sadness to inform you that our George – Cherry Valentine – has tragically passed away. This will come as a profound shock to most people & we understand there is no easy way for this to be announced. As his family, we are still processing his death and our lives will never be the same. We understand how much he is loved and how many lives he has inspired and touched. All we ask is for your patience and your prayers in this time. We love you Georgie 30 November 1993 – 18 September 2022." Subsequently, the second episode from Series 4 was dedicated to Cherry Valentine in their memory on 29 September 2022. Cheddar Gorgeous, Danny Beard, Black Peppa and Jonbers Blonde made the finale on 24 November 2022, with Danny Beard winning the competition.

The fifth series of the show began filming in January 2023. Carol Vorderman was revealed to be the first guest judge for the fifth series of the show. A producer of the show said: "Everyone at Drag Race UK has wanted to have [Vorderman] on the panel for years, so they're over the moon that they have finally made it happen. [She] is a household name and very popular with the public. And, crucially, she's a massive fan of the show and gets what it's all about." Sophie Ellis-Bextor has reportedly been seen arriving to film the show. Sinitta was also reported to have been signed as a guest judge for the fifth season, production stating: "Sinitta is one of the most exciting signings in the show's history. She's a bona fide gay icon and loves outrageous outfits, so she's perfect for Drag Race. In 2023, the show came under scrutiny for the contestants not receiving any cash prize compared to the other Drag Race franchises. Willam Belli, contestant on the fourth season of the American version, commented: "They need to pay the girls a prize. That is thousands and thousands and thousands of pounds worth of outfits and hair. Some of these girls are coming out in the red." The winner of Series 4, Danny Beard, commented that they "could have bought a house", with the money spent preparing for RuPaul's Drag Race UK. On 30 August 2023, BBC revealed the guest judges and special guests for Series 5, including Vorderman, Ellis-Bextor, Yasmin Finney, Suranne Jones, Kristen McMenamy, Karen Hauer, Aisling Bea, who appeared as a special guest in the previous series, Joel Dommett, Alexandra Burke, Cush Jumbo, Edward Enninful, and Daphne Guinness, who previously served as a guest judge on the seventh season of RuPaul's Drag Race All Stars. It was announced in September 2023, that the show had been renewed for a sixth season. Ginger Johnson won the fifth series on 30 November 2023, with Michael Marouli as the runner-up, and Tomara Thomas in third place.

The sixth series was announced in September 2023 via the official Twitter account, with filming beginning in January 2024. In August 2024, it was announced that the show would return in September, with the series being commissioned for 12 episodes unlike the 10 episodes the previous five series had been commissioned for. Later that month, the BBC revealed the promotional poster for the series featuring RuPaul, as well as the list of guest judges, which included AJ Odudu, Alison Goldfrapp, Amanda Holden, Beverley Knight, Claire Richards, Mabel, Siobhán McSweeney and Simon Le Bon, as well as Kristen McMenamy, who served as a guest judge on the first episode of the previous series. Alexandra Burke, who served as a guest judge during the fifth series, was also announced to return as a vocal coach for the sixth series, as well as Claudimar Neto returning as a choreographer. Girls Aloud and The Saturdays dancer, former S Club 8 member Aaron Renfree was revealed to have a guest position within the series, helping the queens during a girl-group challenge. Kyran Thrax, La Voix, Marmalade and Rileasa Slaves made the finale on 28 November 2024, with Kyran Thrax winning the competition. In October 2024, the show was renewed for a seventh series.

On 5 January 2025, it was reported that the first winner of RuPaul's Drag Race UK, The Vivienne, had died at the age of 32. The Vivienne's publicist released the following statement: "It is with immense sadness that we let you know our beloved James Lee Williams - The Vivienne, has passed this weekend. James was an incredibly loved, warm-hearted and amazing person. Their family are heartbroken at the loss of their son, brother and uncle. They are so proud of the wonderful things James achieved in their life and career. We will not be releasing any further details. We please ask that James's family are given the time and privacy they now need to process and grieve." The death of The Vivienne marks the first winner of the Drag Race franchise to pass away.

In September 2025, it was announced that the BBC would renew for the show for the eighth series, and applications for the series were accepted until 17 October. It was announced on 30 July 2026, the 12 competing contestants of the eight series would be revealed on the 11 August, revealing the show would run for ten episodes across ten weeks.

=== Future (2027–onwards): BBC Cancellation, move to WOW Presents Plus, and All Stars ===
On 9 September 2026, the BBC announced that it would end its involvement in RuPaul's Drag Race UK after the eighth series due to "significant financial pressures," with World of Wonder continuing the show on its WOW Presents Plus platform. On the same day, World of Wonder announced its intention to launch an All Stars series of RuPaul's Drag Race UK in autumn 2027.

== Contestants ==
There have been a total of 91 contestants featured in eight series of RuPaul's Drag Race UK, with The Vivienne, Lawrence Chaney, Krystal Versace, Danny Beard, Ginger Johnson, Kyran Thrax, Bones, and Flesh being crowned UK's Next Drag Superstar. 16 contestants have returned to compete on other editions of the Drag Race franchise, including on Canada's Drag Race: Canada vs. the World, RuPaul's Drag Race All Stars, RuPaul's Drag Race Global All Stars, and Drag Race Down Under vs. the World.

== RuPaul's Drag Race: UK vs. the World ==
On 21 December 2021, World of Wonder announced that a spin-off series, RuPaul's Drag Race: UK vs. the World, would premiere on 1 February 2022, with the BBC announcing that the series would coincide with the relaunch of BBC Three as a television channel. The series features queens from the UK version of the show, along with international queens who have competed in the Drag Race franchise around the world. The cast of the first series consisted of Baga Chipz, Blu Hydrangea and Cheryl Hole (all from UK series 1), Mo Heart (US season 10 and All Stars 4) and Jujubee (US season 2, and All Stars 1 and All Stars 5), Jimbo and Lemon (both from Canada season 1), Janey Jacké (Holland season 1), and Pangina Heals (the co-host of Drag Race Thailand). During the finale on 8 March 2022, Blu Hydrangea was crowned "Queen of the Mothertucking World", winning the opportunity to record a remix of the song "Champion" with RuPaul, with Mo Heart placing runner-up.

In December 2023, it was announced that RuPaul's Drag Race: UK vs. the World would be returning for a second series. The cast was announced at RuPaul's DragCon UK on 13 January 2024, and consisted of Gothy Kendoll (UK series 1), Tia Kofi (UK series 2), Choriza May (UK series 3), Jonbers Blonde (UK series 4), Scarlet Envy (US season 11 and All Stars 6), Mayhem Miller (US season 10 and All Stars 5), Keta Minaj (Holland season 2), Hannah Conda (Down Under season 2), Marina Summers (Philippines season 1), La Grande Dame (France season 1), and Arantxa Castilla-La Mancha (España season 1). The series began on 9 February 2024, with the winner receiving a cash prize of £50,000 – the first cash prize to be awarded on a British version of the show. During the finale on 29 March 2024, Tia Kofi was crowned the next "Queen of the Mothertucking World", with Hannah Conda placing runner-up.

On 24 December 2025, the BBC announced that a third series of RuPaul's Drag Race: UK vs. the World would be broadcast in 2026. The cast was announced on 8 January 2026, and consisted of Sminty Drop (UK series 4), Kate Butch (UK series 5), Zahirah Zapanta (UK series 6), Mariah Balenciaga (US season 3 and All Stars 5), Melinda Verga (Canada season 4), Fontana (Sverige season 1), Gawdland (Thailand season 3), Minty Fresh (Philippines season 1), Serena Morena (México season 1), and The Only Naomy (Germany season 1). The series began on 27 January 2026. During the finale on 17 March 2026, Gawdland was crowned the next "Queen of the Mothertucking World", with Kate Butch placing runner-up.

Following the success of RuPaul's Drag Race: UK vs. the World, a Canadian version of the spin-off was announced in June 2022, and the first season began airing on BBC Three and BBC iPlayer in the United Kingdom on 18 November 2022. Vanity Milan and Victoria Scone, both from the third series of RuPaul's Drag Race UK, represented the United Kingdom in the competition. Ra'Jah O'Hara, who originally competed in the eleventh season of RuPaul's Drag Race and the sixth season of All Stars, won the first season on 23 December 2022, with Silky Nutmeg Ganache placing runner-up. A second season of Canada's Drag Race: Canada vs. the World was confirmed in June 2023. The second season began airing on BBC Three and BBC iPlayer on 19 July 2024, with Cheryl (UK series 1 and UK vs. the World series 1) and Le Fil (UK series 4) representing the United Kingdom in the competition. Lemon, who previously competed in the first season of Canada's Drag Race and the first series of RuPaul's Drag Race: UK vs. the World, won the second season on 23 August 2024, with Alexis Mateo placing runner-up.

In August 2025, an Australian and New Zealand version of the spin-off was announced, with Michael Marouli (UK series 5) representing the United Kingdom in the competition. The series began on 24 July 2026. Michael Marouli won the competition during the finale on 11 September 2026, with Art Simone placing runner-up.

== Discography ==
| Title | Series | Peak chart positions | |
| Title | Series | UK | US Dance |
|---|---|---|---|
| "Break Up (Bye Bye)" | 1 | 35 | 44 |
| "To the Moon (Cast Version)" | 1 | — | — |
| "Rats: The Rusical" | 2 | — | — |
| "UK Hun?" | 2 | 27 | — |
| "A Little Bit of Love (Cast Version)" | 2 | — | — |
| "B.D.E. (Big Drag Energy)" | 3 | — (Note: While the song did not chart on the UK Singles Chart, it reached number 39 on the UK Singles Downloads Chart and number 40 on the UK Singles Sales Chart.) | — |
| "Hey Sis, It's Christmas (Cast Version)" | 3 | — (Note: While the song did not chart on the UK Singles Chart, it reached number 26 on the UK Singles Downloads Chart and number 30 on the UK Singles Sales Chart.) | — |
| "Come Alive" | 4 | — | — |
| "Lairy Poppins: The Rusical" | 4 | — | — |
| "UK Grand Finale Megamix" | 4 | — | — |
| "Don't Ick My Yum" | 5 | — | — |
| "Pant-Oh She Better Don't: The Rusical" | 5 | — | — |
| "Dead or Alive" | 6 | — | — |
| "Pop of the Tops - Live: The Rusical" | 6 | — | — |
| "A Different Winner's Story" | 6 | — | — |
| "She Ate That" | 7 | — | — |
| "Peter Pansy: The Rusical" | 7 | — | — |
| "Money Shot" | 7 | — | — |

== International broadcasts ==
The first series was broadcast on the Logo TV network in the US, on OutTV and Crave in Canada, on Vitaya in Belgium, on DR TV in Denmark, on Stan in Australia, on Yes Drama in Israel and on Star+ in Brazil, While the second series was broadcast on Real Time in Italy, under the name Drag Race UK.

== Awards and nominations ==
| Year | Award | Category | Nominee(s) | Result | Ref. |
|---|---|---|---|---|---|
| 2020 | National Television Awards | Bruce Forsyth Entertainment Award | RuPaul's Drag Race UK | Nominated | |
| 2020 | National Television Awards | TV Judge | RuPaul | Nominated | |
| 2020 | Royal Television Society Programme Awards | Best Entertainment Programme | RuPaul's Drag Race UK | Won | |
| 2020 | British Academy Television Awards | Best Reality and Constructed Factual | RuPaul's Drag Race UK | Nominated | |
| 2021 | National Television Awards | Talent Show | RuPaul's Drag Race UK | Nominated | |
| 2021 | Broadcast Awards | Best Entertainment Programme | RuPaul's Drag Race UK | Won | |
| 2021 | Broadcast Awards | Best Multichannel Programme | RuPaul's Drag Race UK | Won | |
| 2021 | MTV Movie & TV Awards | Best International Reality Series | RuPaul's Drag Race UK | Nominated | |
| 2021 | British Academy Scotland Awards | Audience Award | Lawrence Chaney | Won | |
| 2022 | British Academy Television Awards | Best Reality and Constructed Factual | RuPaul's Drag Race UK | Nominated | |
| 2022 | British Academy Television Awards | Virgin TV's Must-See Moment | Bimini Bon-Boulash's verse in "UK Hun?" | Nominated | |
| 2022 | National Television Awards | Talent Show | RuPaul's Drag Race UK | Nominated | |
| 2022 | National Television Awards | Talent Show Judge | RuPaul | Nominated | |
| 2022 | Royal Television Society Craft & Design Awards | Costume Design – Entertainment & Non Drama | Zaldy, Eve Collins | Nominated | |
| 2023 | British Academy Television Awards | Best Reality and Constructed Factual | RuPaul's Drag Race UK | Nominated | |
| 2024 | American Reality Television Awards | International Reality Series | RuPaul's Drag Race UK | Nominated | |
| 2025 | Royal Television Society Programme Awards | Entertainment | RuPaul's Drag Race UK | Nominated | |
