= Girl groups in the Drag Race franchise =

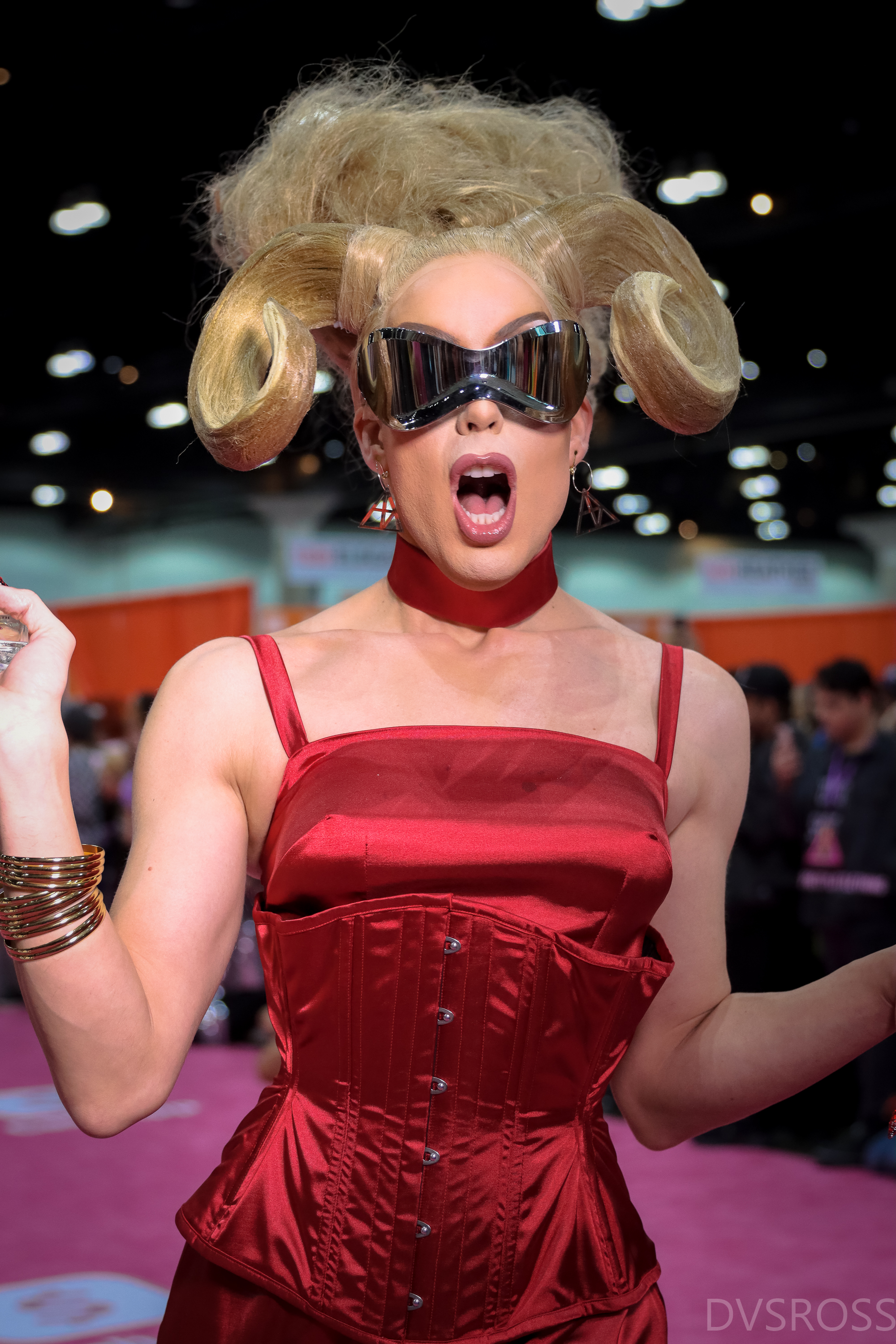
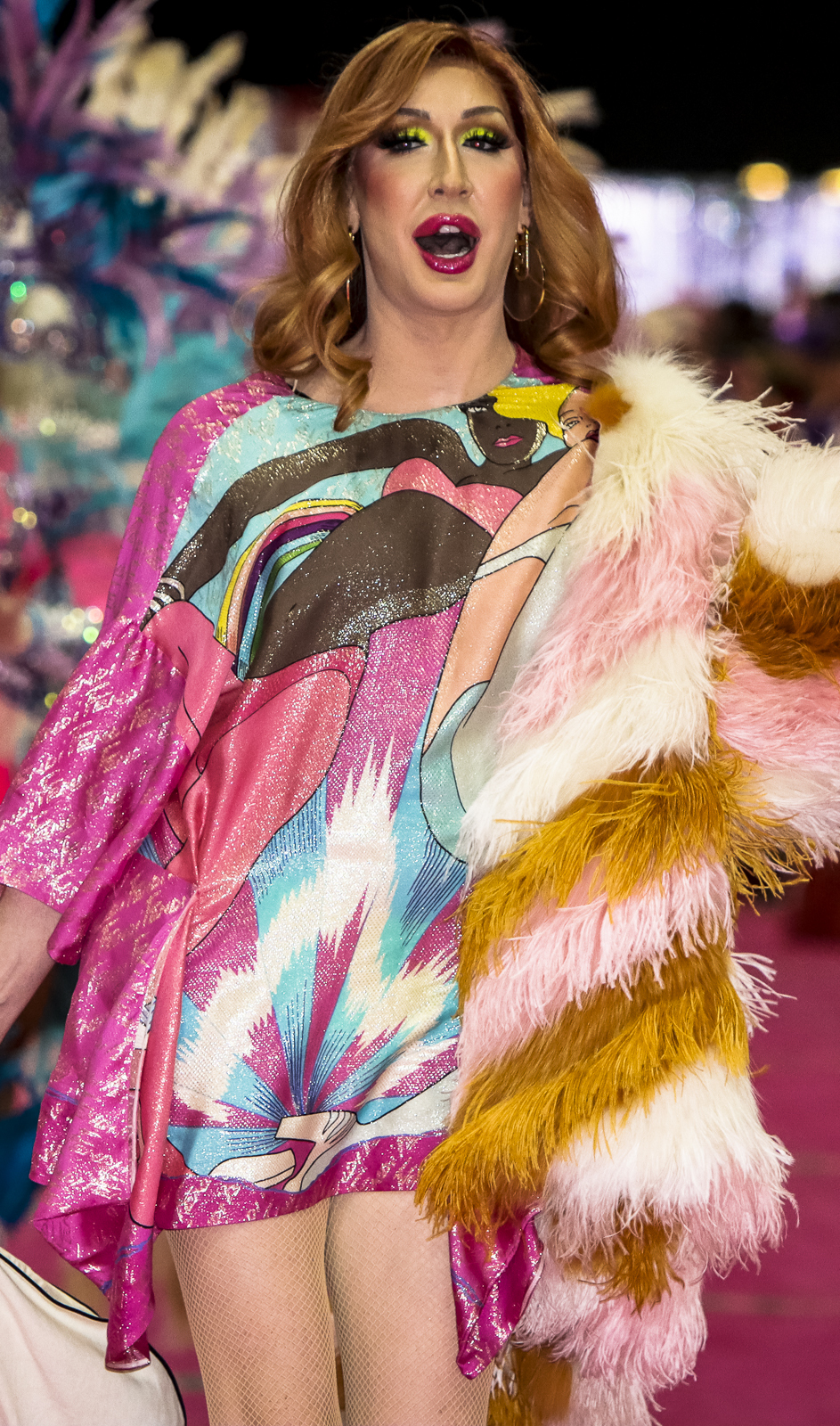
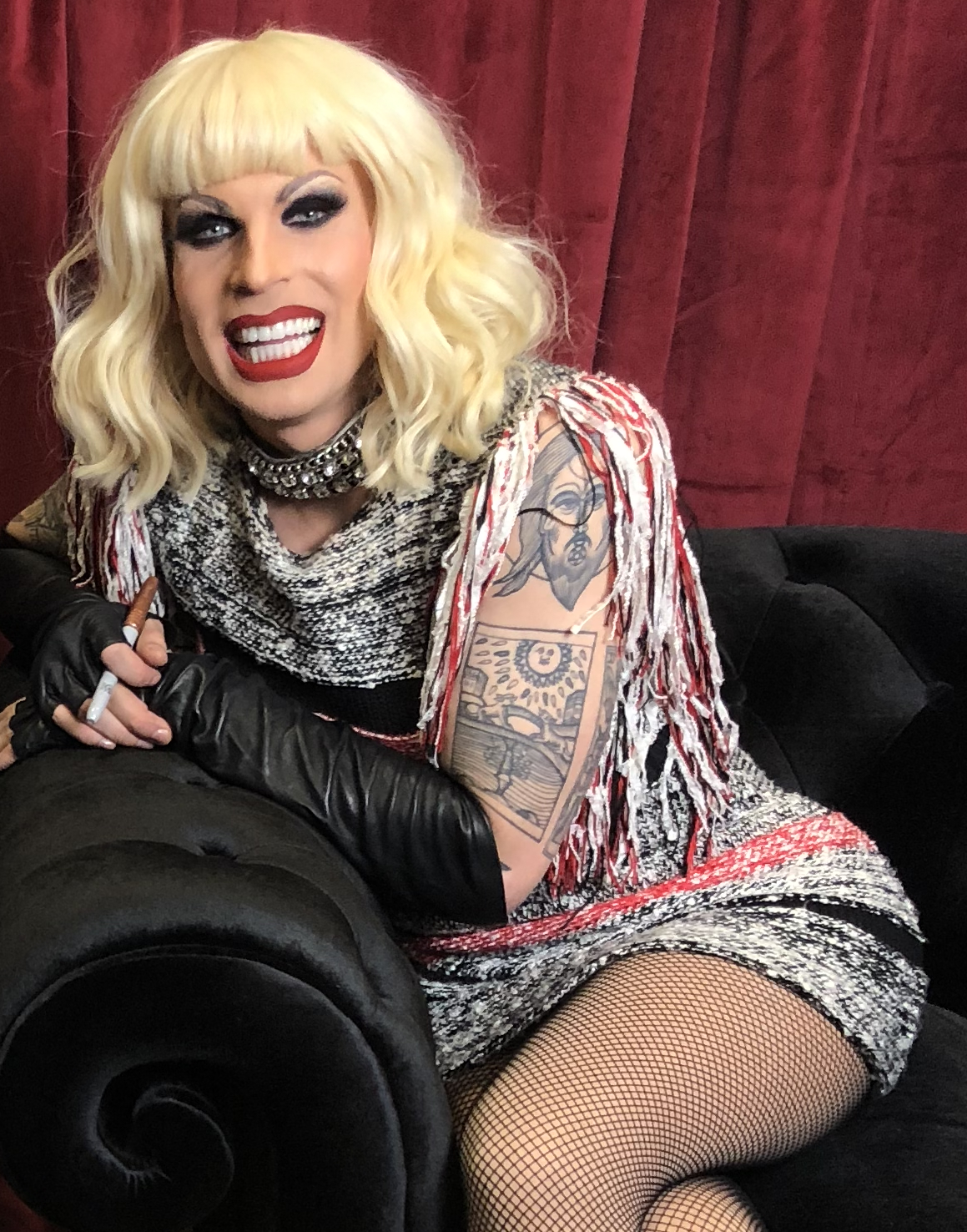
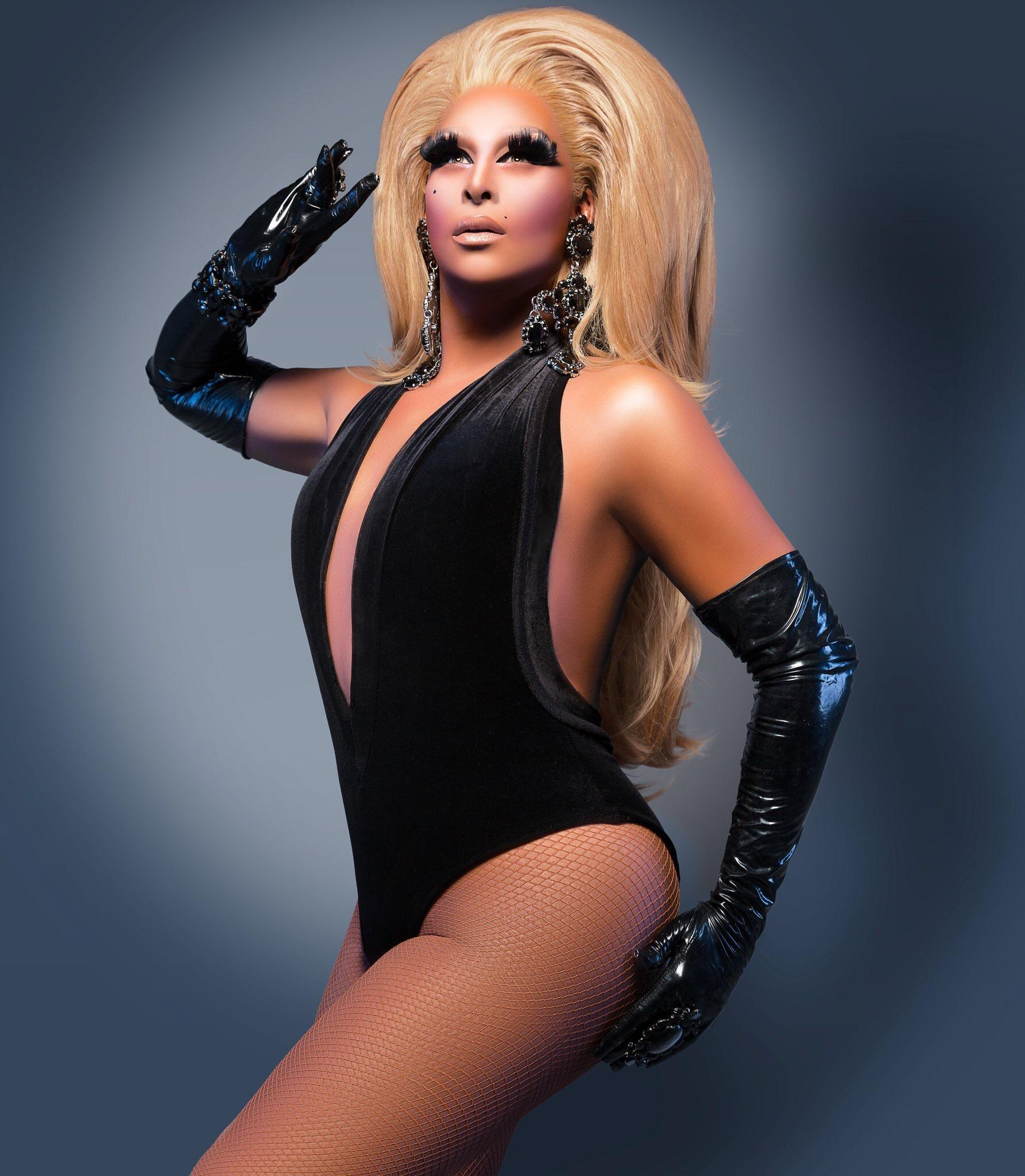
Within the Drag Race franchise, the girl group challenge originated with the second season of RuPaul's Drag Race All Stars, which saw Alaska (top left), Detox (top right), Katya (bottom left), and Roxxxy Andrews (bottom right) perform to "Read U Wrote U".

Girl groups have been featured across the Drag Race franchise. Many Drag Race series have hosted challenges requiring girl groups to compete against one another. The challenge started with the second season of the American spin-off series RuPaul's Drag Race All Stars. In 2022, Sam Brooks of The Spinoff said the girl group challenge has become a "classic" and a season highlight because "it tests the contestant's ability to write a verse, choreograph a dance routine, remember that choreography, and most crucially, work with others in a team".

Some of the groups formed on shows continued to perform together after filming ended. Pride.com's Bernardo Sim has called the United Kingdolls, which was formed by A'Whora, Bimini Bon-Boulash, Lawrence Chaney, and Tayce on the second series of RuPaul's Drag Race UK, the best Drag Race girl group.

== United States ==
=== RuPaul's Drag Race ===
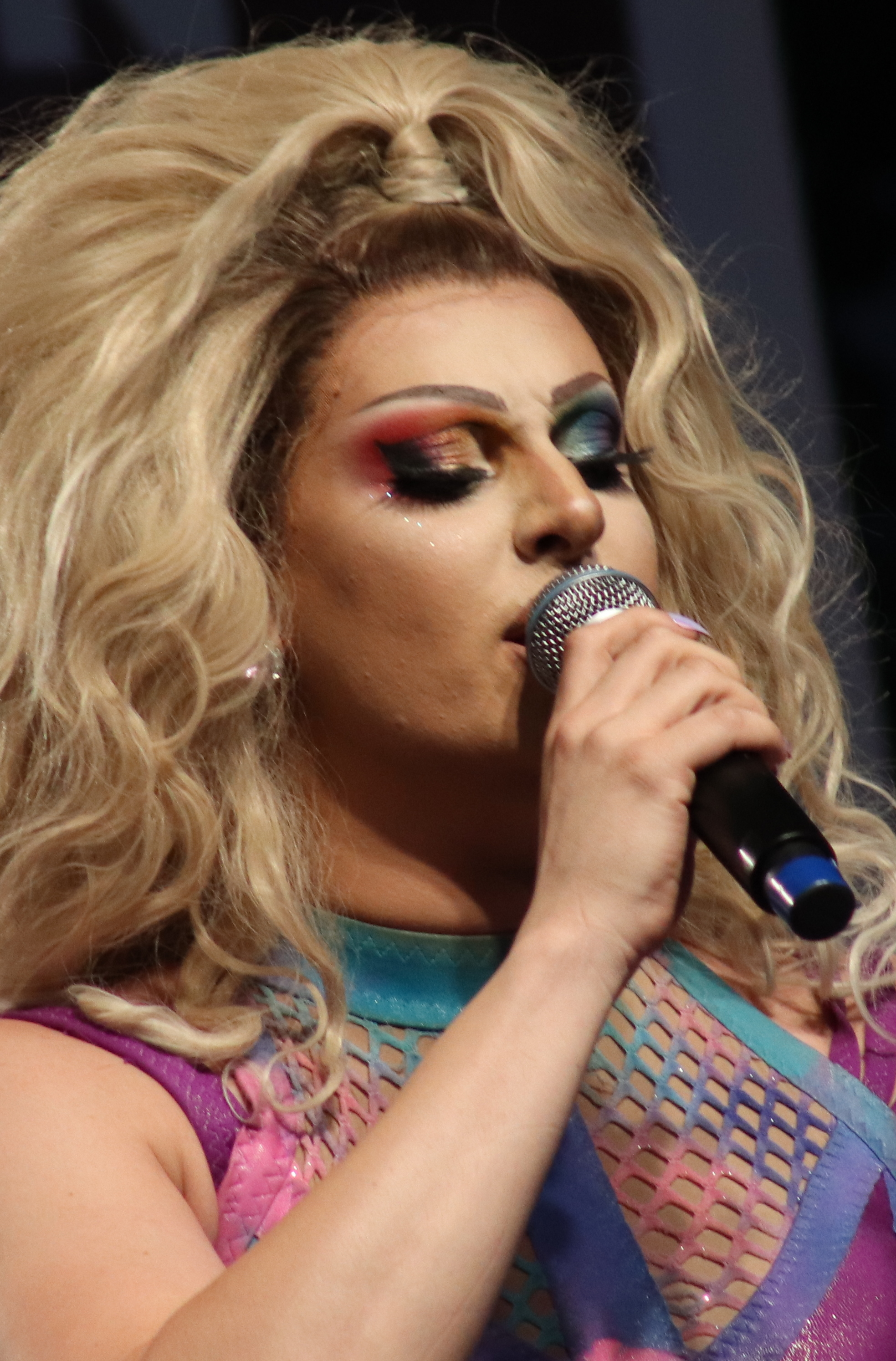
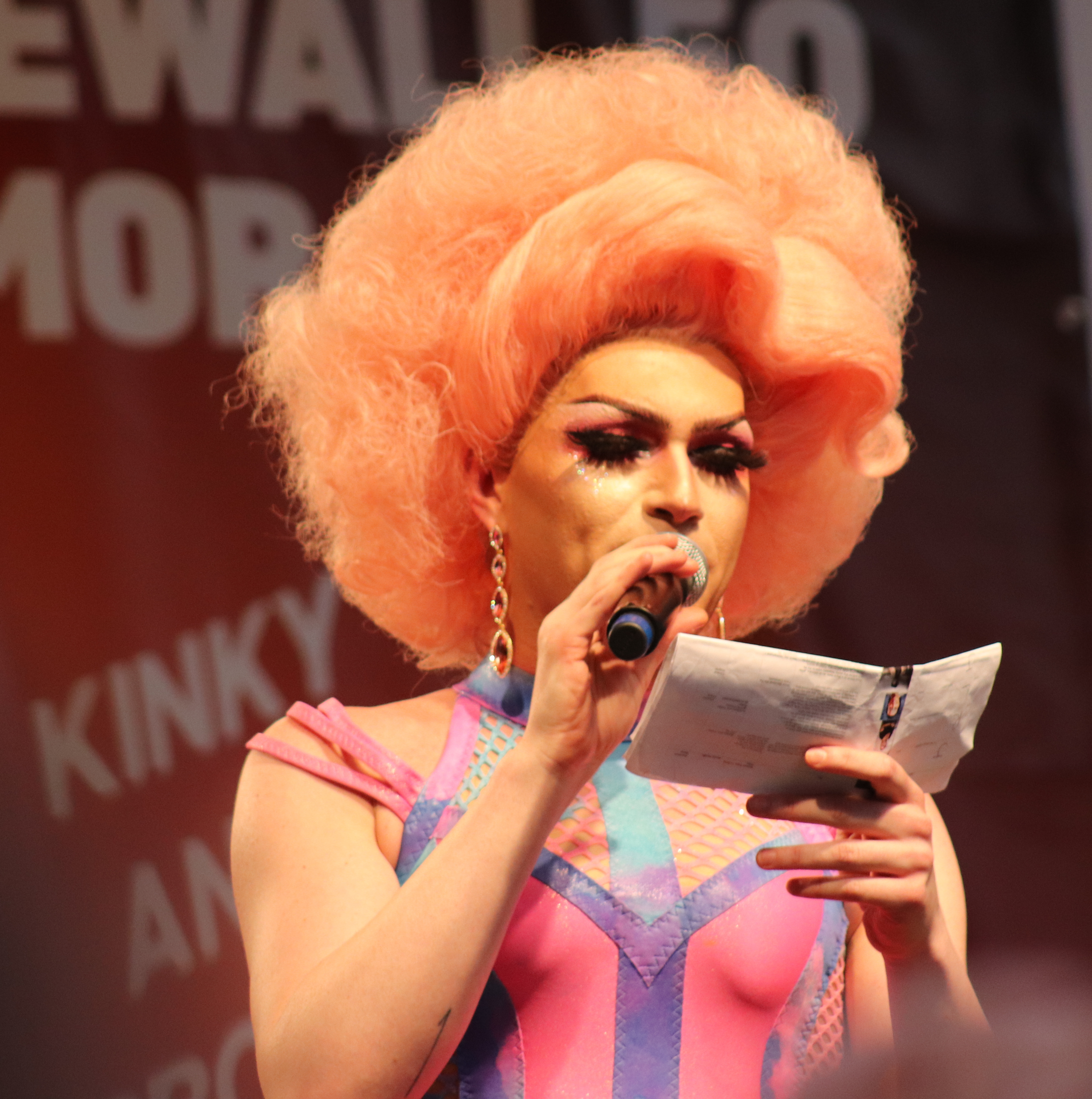
RuPaul's Drag Race contestants Jan Sport (left) and Rosé (right) are members of the girl group Stephanie's Child, along with Lagoona Bloo.

The sixth season ("Oh No She Betta Don't!") of the American series RuPaul's Drag Race saw the creation of the Panty Hos, members of which included Adore Delano, Bianca Del Rio, Courtney Act, Darienne Lake, and Laganja Estranja.

The ninth (2017), tenth (2018), and eleventh (2019) seasons did not have main challenges requiring girl groups to face off. However, all three seasons saw contestants perform as a girl group. On the ninth season, top four contestants Peppermint, Sasha Velour, Shea Couleé, and Trinity the Tuck performed to "Category Is" in an episode of the same name. Aquaria, Asia O'Hara, Eureka O'Hara, and Kameron Michaels performed to "American" on the tenth season's episode of the same name, and the eleventh season saw A'keria C. Davenport, Brooke Lynn Hytes, Silky Nutmeg Ganache, Vanessa Vanjie Mateo, and Yvie Oddly perform to "Queens Everywhere" in an episode of the same name.

On the twelfth season (2020), Crystal Methyd, Gigi Goode, Jackie Cox, and Jaida Essence Hall performed "Viva Drag Vegas (Medley)" in the twelfth episode "Viva Drag Vegas". The thirteenth season (2021) saw Gottmik, Kandy Muse, Rosé, and Symone perform to "Lucky" in the fourteenth episode "Gettin' Lucky". Rosé and season twelve contestant Jan are members of the girl group Stephanie's Child, along with Lagoona Bloo. The fourteenth season saw the formation of three 1960s-inspired girl groups for a main challenge in the eighth episode "60s Girl Groups": The Ru-Nettes, inspired by the American girl group The Ronettes, included DeJa Skye, Jasmine Kennedie, and Jorgeous); The Ru-Premes, inspired by the Motown group The Supremes, included Angeria Paris VanMicheals, Kerri Colby, and Lady Camden; and The Shang-Ru-Las, inspired by the American pop group The Shangri-Las, included Bosco, Daya Betty, and Willow Pill.

On the fifteenth season (2023), the main challenge of the sixth episode "Old Friends Gold" required contestants to write lyrics and perform as old lady girl groups. Luxx Noir London, Marcia Marcia Marcia, Mistress Isabelle Brooks, and Salina EsTitties perform a country song. Aura Mayari, Malaysia Babydoll Foxx, Sasha Colby, and Spice perform a metal song. Anetra, Jax, Loosey LaDuca, and Robin Fierce perform a hip hop song. Aura Mayari won the challenge.

The sixteenth season (fifth episode "Girl Groups") had a challenge requiring three competing girl groups to perform to remixes of songs from RuPaul's album Black Butta (2023). Thicc & Stick, which included Geneva Karr, Megami, Mhi'ya Iman LePaige, and Nymphia Wind, performed to "A.S.M.R. Lover" and won the challenge. Lovah Girlz (Amanda Tori Meating, Plane Jane, Plasma, and Xunami Muse) performed to "Courage to Love" and Q.D.S.M. (Dawn, Morphine Love Dion, Q, and Sapphira Cristál) performed to "Star Baby". Outside of the show, Nymphia Wind has performed as part of a K-pop girl group in Taiwan, and Sapphira Cristál has been a member of the Philadelphia-based group Philly's Foxes.

The eighteenth season's second episode ("Q-Pop Girl Groups") saw contestants perform in three girl groups. The tracks are "Funk Almighty", a disco song inspired by Sylvester, "Go-Go-Go!", a pop song inspired by Wham!, and "Cherries", a punk rock song inspired by The Runaways.

=== RuPaul's Drag Race All Stars ===
Within the Drag Race franchise, the girl group challenge originated with the second season (2016) of the spin-off series RuPaul's Drag Race All Stars. The competition required top four contestants Alaska, Detox, Katya, and Roxxxy Andrews to write, record, and perform to "Read U Wrote U" in the eighth episode "All Stars Supergroup". In 2021, Brett White of Decider.com called the song "gay canon" and said Roxxxy Andrews's verse "might as well be the gay pledge of allegiance". He complimented the choreography (particularly Detox's chair walk), as well as the lyrics and Roxxxy Andrews's outfit. White wrote, "'Read U Wrote U' is as perfect and vital a piece of queer culture as 'I Will Survive', Golden Girls, and Courteney Cox's bangs in Scream 3. This legendary performance is ... why thousands of queens started doing drag."

The third season (2018) featured a girl group with BeBe Zahara Benet as Jungle Kitty, BenDeLaCreme as Wednesday Addams-inspired Goth Kitty, Kennedy Davenport as Diva Kitty, Shangela as Sparkle Kitty, and Trixie Mattel as I.Q. Kitty. The group performed "Drag Up Your Life" and won the challenge. A competing group performed "Sitting on a Secret". Billboard's Stephen Daw included the two songs in a 2021 list of the ten best musical numbers in the history of series. The season also saw BeBe Zahara Benet, Kennedy Davenport, Shangela, and Trixie Mattel perform to "Kitty Girl".

On the fourth season (2019), Monét X Change, Monique Heart, Naomi Smalls, and Trinity the Tuck performed to a remix of "Super Queen". The fifth season (2020) saw top three contestants Jujubee, Miz Cracker, and Shea Couleé perform to "Clap Back".

The seventh season (2022) had a Total Request Live-themed girl group challenge, during which performers referenced "Y2K culture", according to Screen Rant. Members of MSTR included Monét X Change, Raja, Shea Couleé, and Trinity the Tuck, and members of The Other Girls included Jaida Essence Hall, Jinkx Monsoon, The Vivienne, and Yvie Oddly. The Other Girls performed "2getha 4eva", and The Vivienne and Yvie Oddly won the challenge.

An episode on the ninth season (2024) tasked contestants with giving makeovers to firefighters and recording verses to "Pussy on Fire", then performing in girl groups of three. One group included Roxxxy Andrews and Vanessa Vanjie Mateo.

Two girl groups performed country songs on the tenth season episode "Stagecooch".

== International ==
=== Canada's Drag Race and Canada vs. the World ===
The first season (2020) of Canada's Drag Race saw Priyanka, Rita Baga, and Scarlett BoBo perform to "U Wear It Well". The girl group challenge on the second season (2021) saw a contest between the Dosey-Hoes and the Giddy Girls. The fourth season (2023–2024) also had a girl group challenge. The fifth season saw two groups perform 1990s-themed songs.

On the first season of Canada's Drag Race: Canada vs. the World, members of the group SRV included Ra'Jah O'Hara, Silky Nutmeg Ganache, and Vanity Milan.

=== Drag Race Brasil ===
The first season of Drag Race Brasil saw the formation of the groups Bad Girls and Good Girls. Organzza won the challenge.

=== Drag Race Down Under and Drag Race Down Under vs. the World ===
The first season (2021) of Drag Race Down Under (originally RuPaul's Drag Race Down Under) had a challenge requiring two girl groups to compete. One group included Anita Wigl'it, Coco Jumbo, Etcetera Etcetera, and Scarlet Adams, and the other included Elektra Shock, Karen from Finance, Kita Mean, and Maxi Shield. On the second season (2022), one group included Beverly Kills, Molly Poppinz, and Yuri Guaii, and the other included Hannah Conda, Kween Kong, and Spankie Jackzon. The third season (2023) had a challenge requiring groups to perform choreography with bicycles.

A main challenge on the fourth season (2024) tasked contestants with competing as two girl groups inspired by Olivia Newton-John's character Sandy in the 1978 musical film Grease. The Good Sandys and the Bad Sandys performed "Mr. Right" and "Mr. Right Now", respectively.

The spin-off series Drag Race Down Under vs. the World had a Kylie Minogue girl group challenge.

=== Drag Race France and Drag Race France All Stars ===
On the second season (episode "Showtime!") of Drag Race France, contestants perform in girl groups to Nicky Doll's "Attention". On the fourth season, the girl group challenge has contestants design original looks for the performances of "Hands Up" and "Perfect".

There was a girl group challenge on the "Superstars" episode of the spin-off series Drag Race France All Stars.

=== Drag Race Italia ===
Barry Levitt of Vulture said the Rusical on the second season of Drag Race Italia felt like a girl group challenge. Participants in Lady Gaga: The Unauthorized Rusical included challenge winner La Petite Noire as well as Nehellenia.

=== Drag Race México and Latina Royale ===
Drag Race México: Latina Royale had a girl group challenge (episode "Guerra de Grupas").

=== Drag Race Philippines and Drag Race Philippines: Slaysian Royale ===
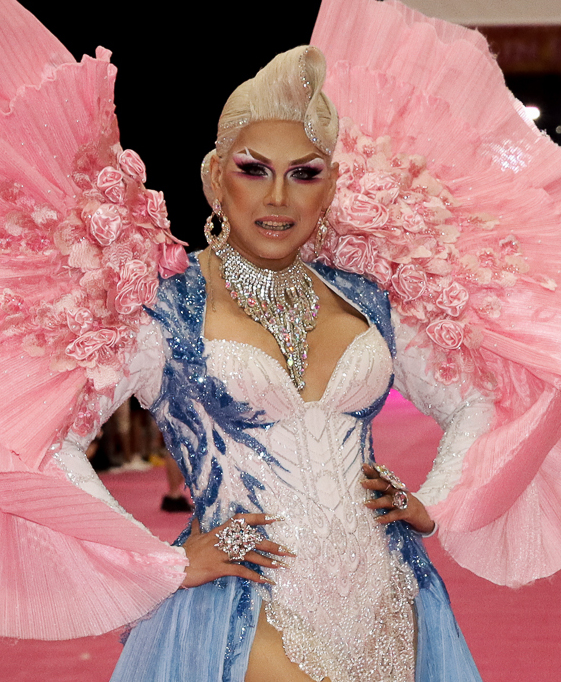
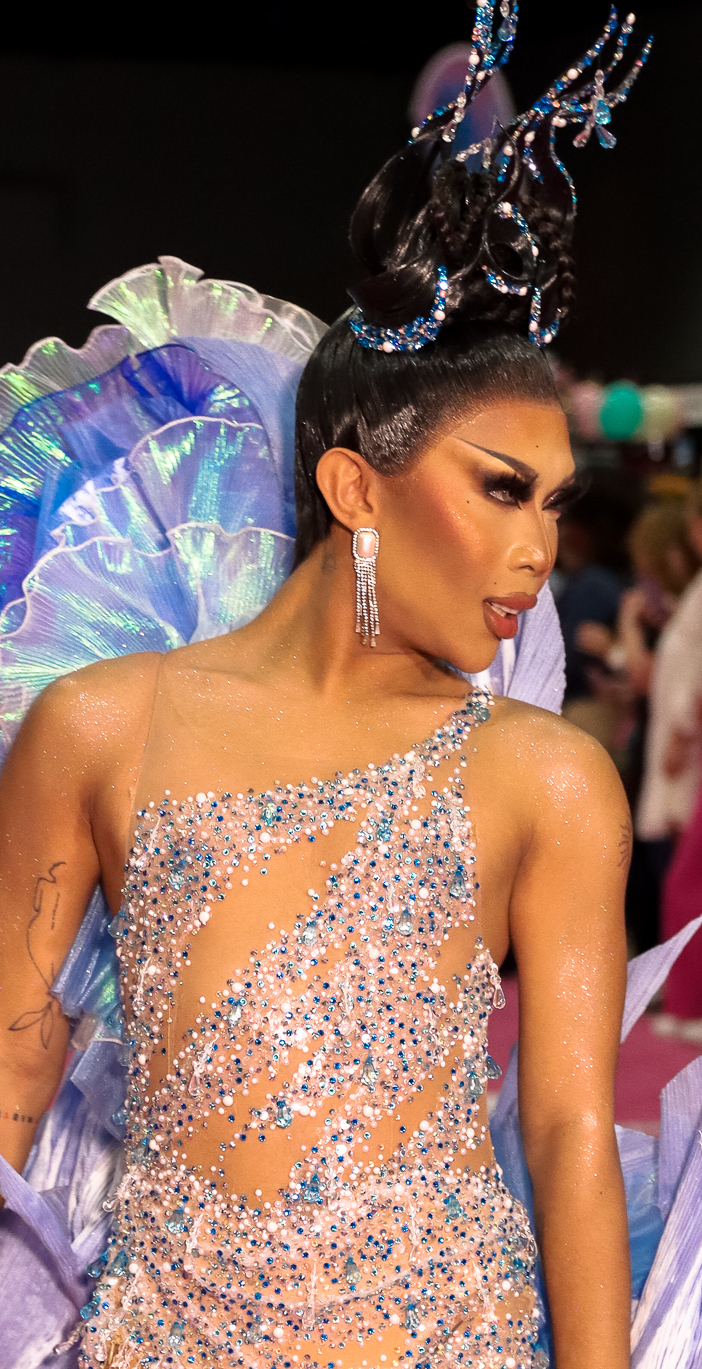
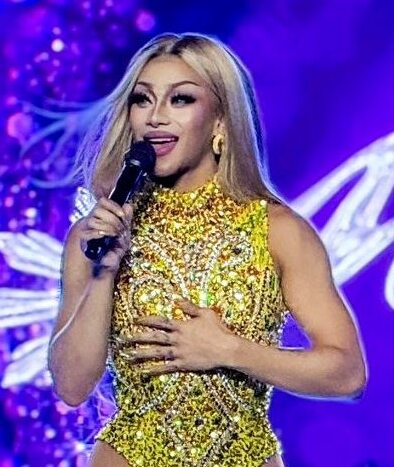
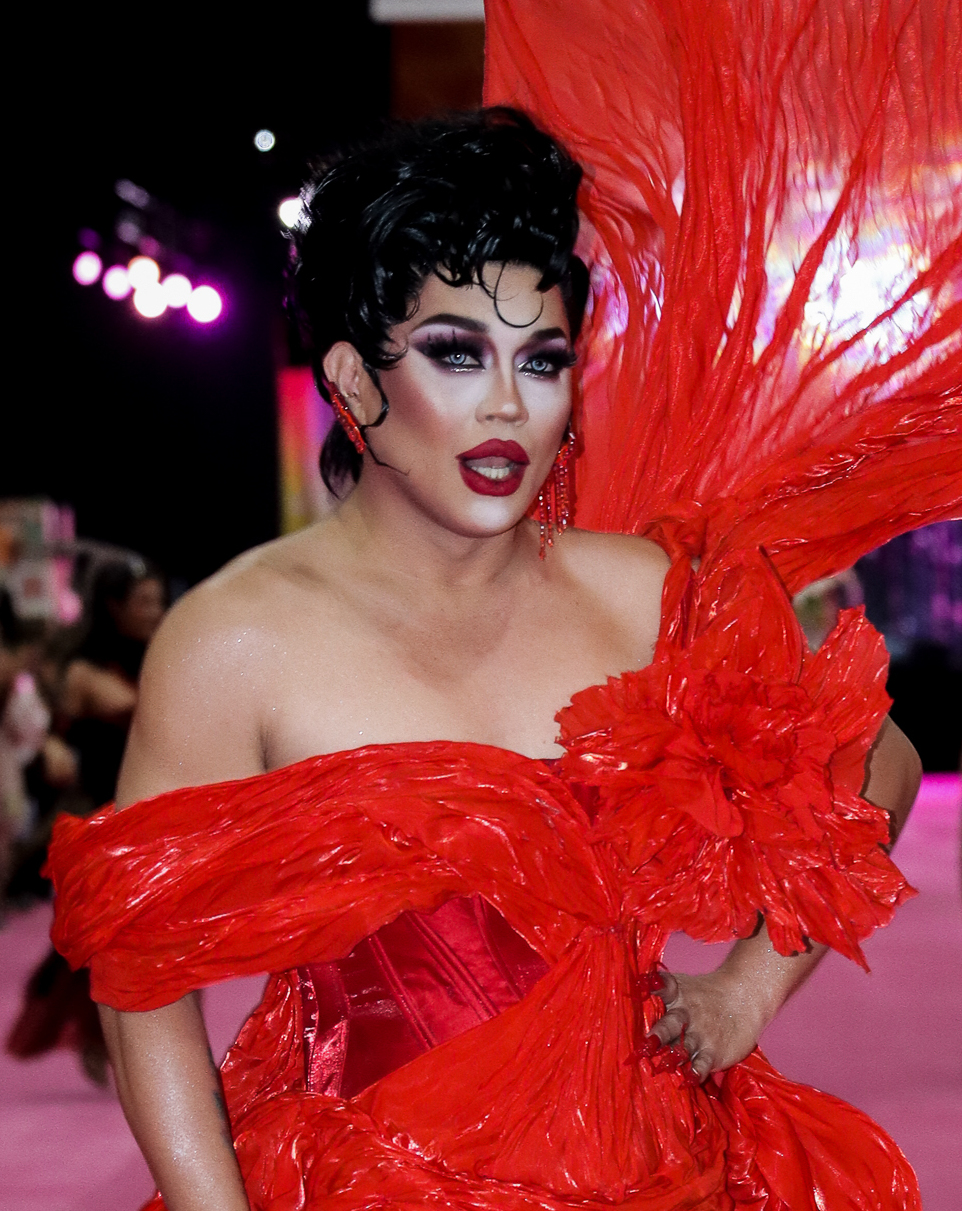
Captivating Katkat (top left), Marina Summers (top right), Maxie (bottom left), and Precious Paula Nicole (bottom right) are members of Reyna.

The first season of Drag Race Philippines had a girl group challenge. Members of the Flexbomb Girls included Turing, who was deemed the winner of the challenge, as well as Eva Le Queen, Lady Morgana, and Marina Summers. The group performed "Pop Off Ate", which Pride.com said became "a viral sensation in the fandom". The other group was Pink Pussy Energy (or PPE), which included Gigi Era, Minty Fresh, Precious Paula Nicole, Viñas DeLuxe, and Xilhouete.

On the third season, two competing girl groups recorded original verses for the song "Dapat Pakak".

The episode "Asian Eyyy!" of the spin-off series Drag Race Philippines: Slaysian Royale had a girl group challenge.

Members of the girl group REYN4 include contestants Captivating Katkat, Marina Summers, Maxie Andreison, and Precious Paula Nicole.

=== Drag Race Thailand ===
On the second season (2019) of Drag Race Thailand, Angele Anang, Bandit, Kana Warrior, Kandy Zyanide, and Vanda Miss Joaquim performed to a remix of "I Will Survive".

=== RuPaul's Drag Race Global All Stars ===
On RuPaul's Drag Race Global All Stars, three girl groups performed variations of "Say Love".

=== RuPaul's Drag Race UK ===
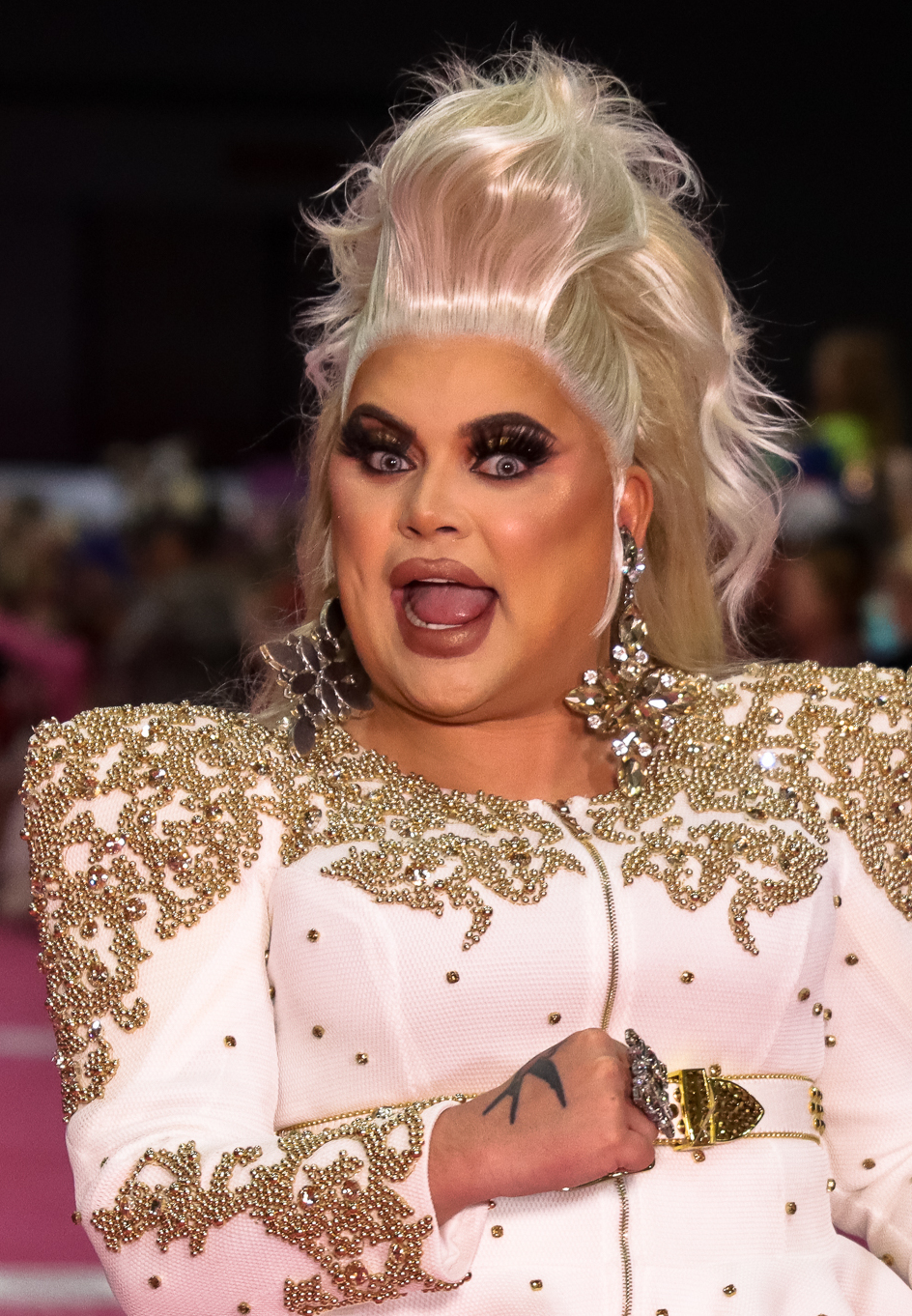
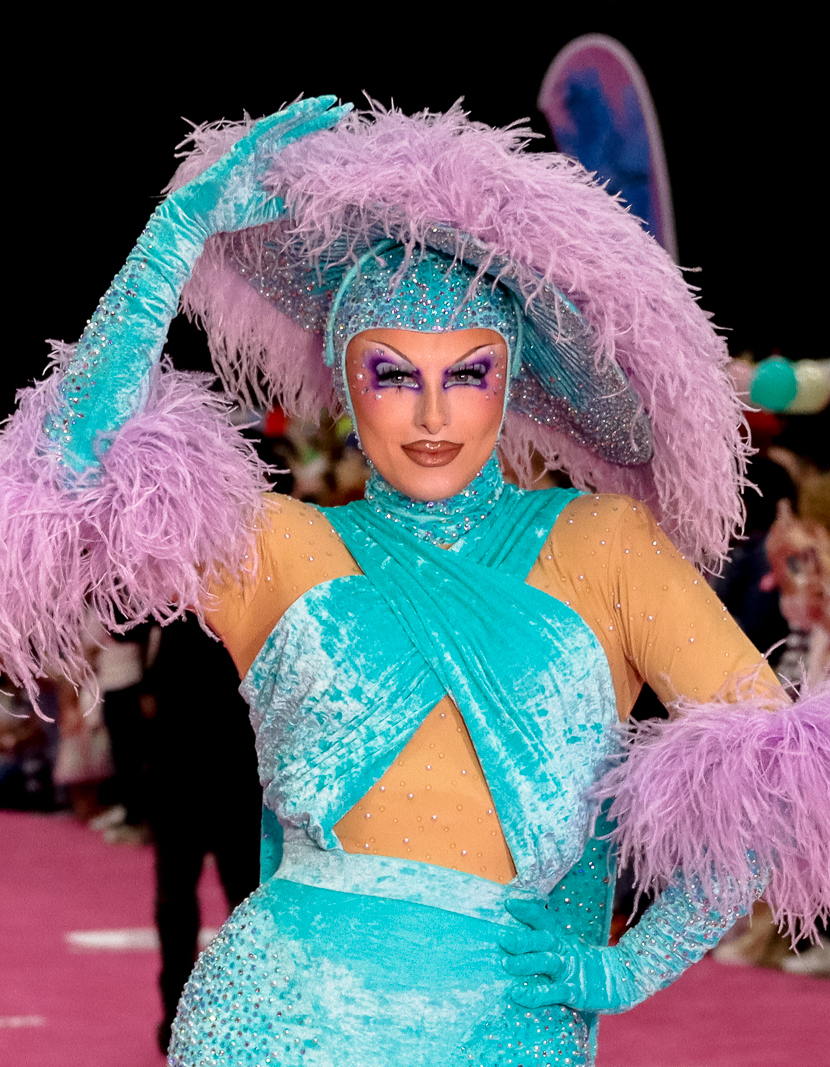
Baga Chipz (left) and Blu Hydrangea (right) formed the Frock Destroyers with Divina de Campo on the first series of RuPaul's Drag Race UK.

On the first series (2019) of RuPaul's Drag Race UK, Baga Chipz, Blu Hydrangea, and Divina de Campo formed a girl group called the Frock Destroyers. The group performed "Break Up (Bye Bye)" and continued to tour after the show aired. In 2023, Bernardo Sim of Pride.com included "Break Up (Bye Bye)" in a list of the ten best original songs from the Drag Race franchise. In another 2023 list of the ten most iconic moments on the series, Sim wrote: "The girl-groups challenge is now a staple on Drag Race UK, and that only happened due to the gigantic success of this challenge in the first season." The first series also saw Baga Chipz, Divina de Campo, and The Vivienne perform to "Rock It (To the Moon)".

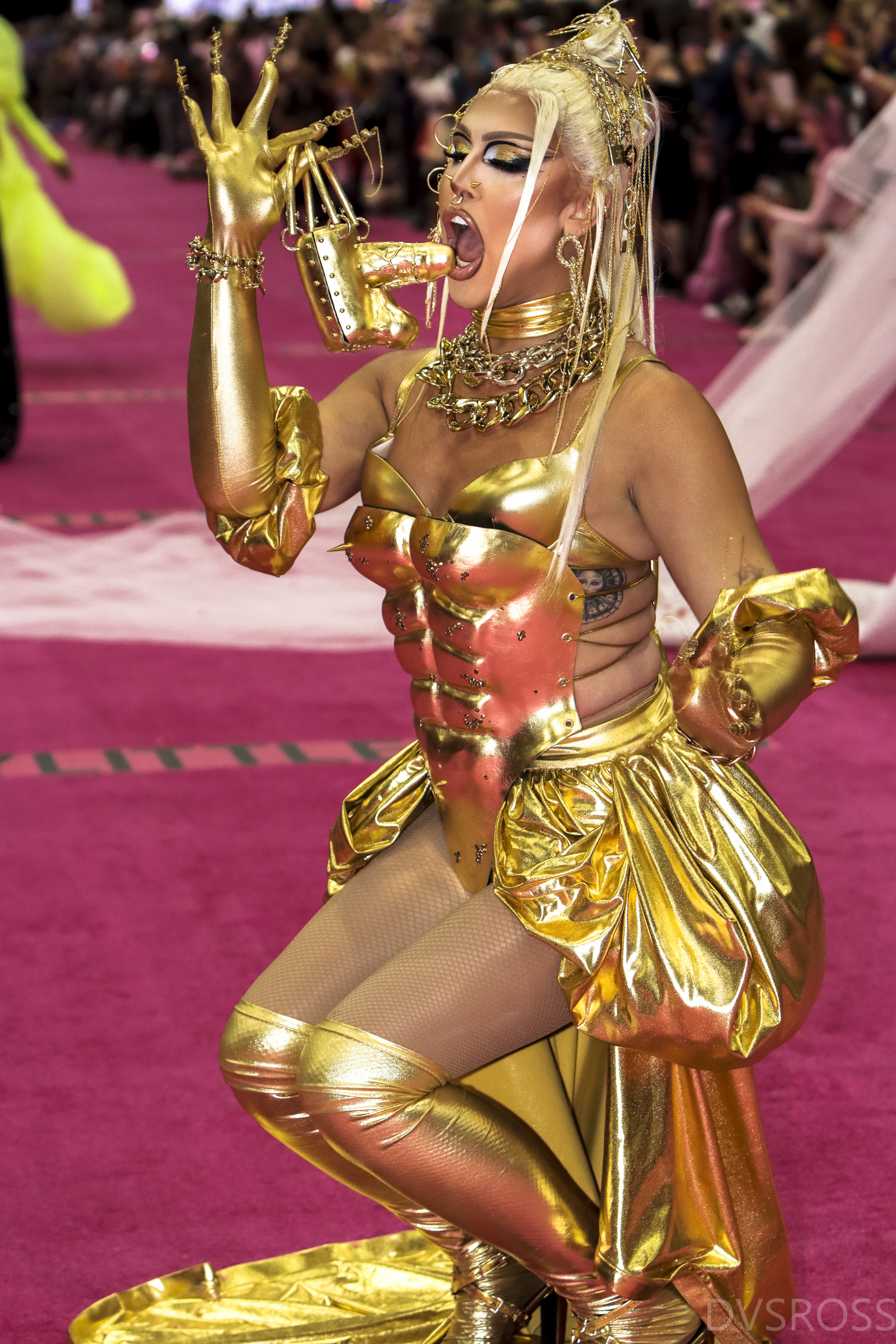
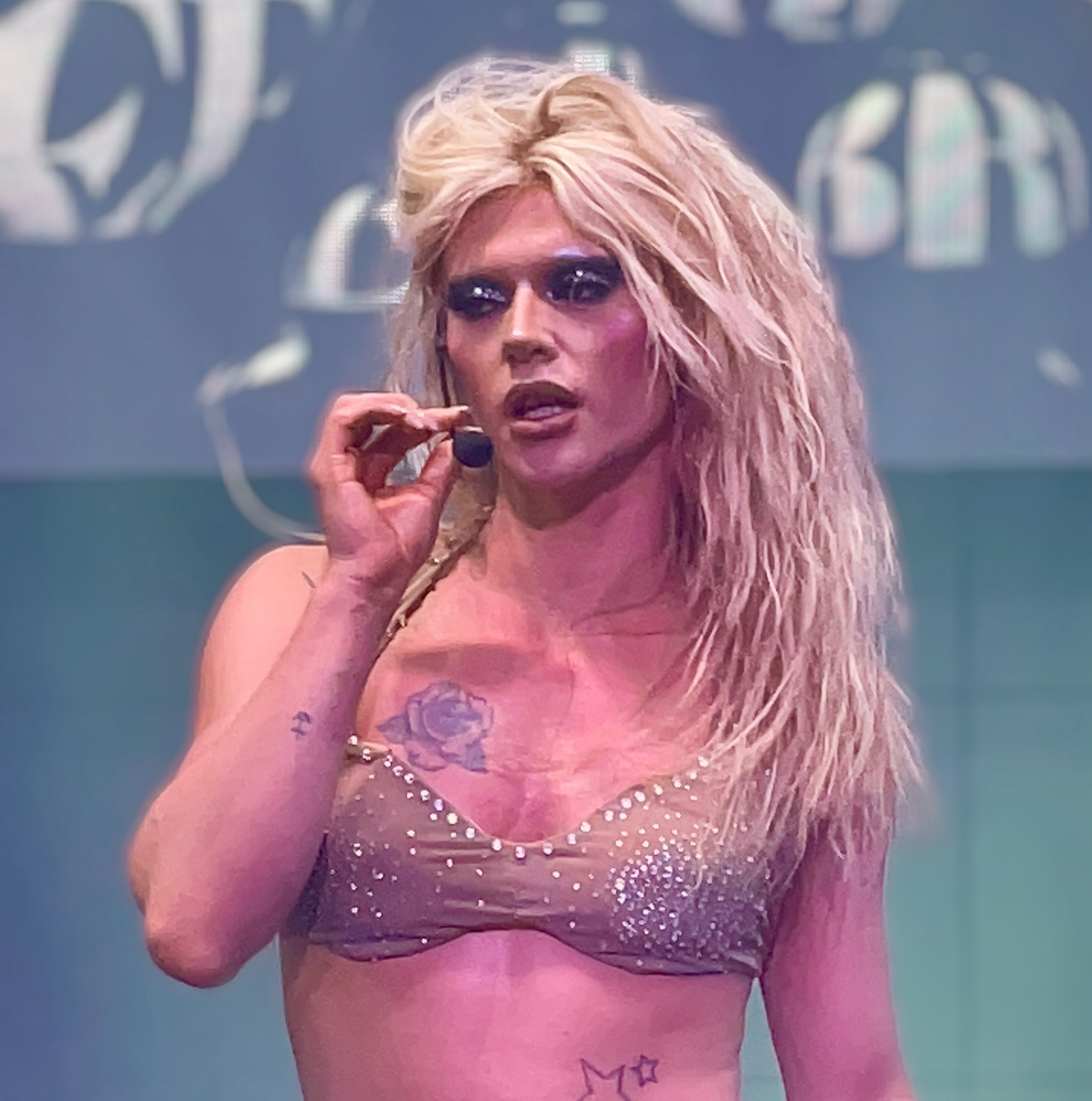
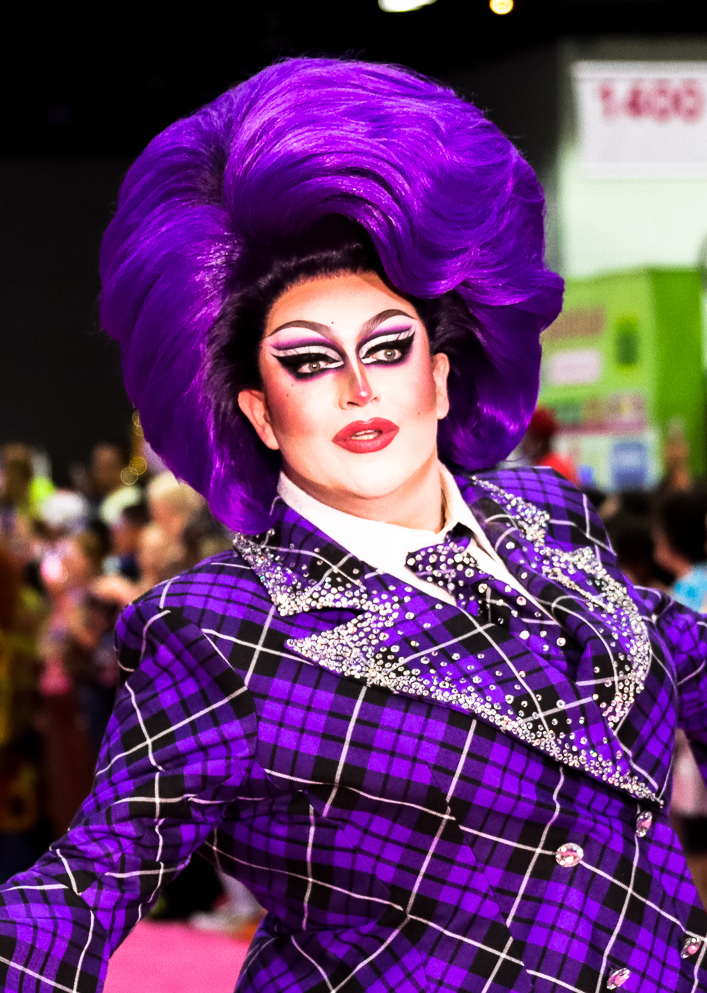
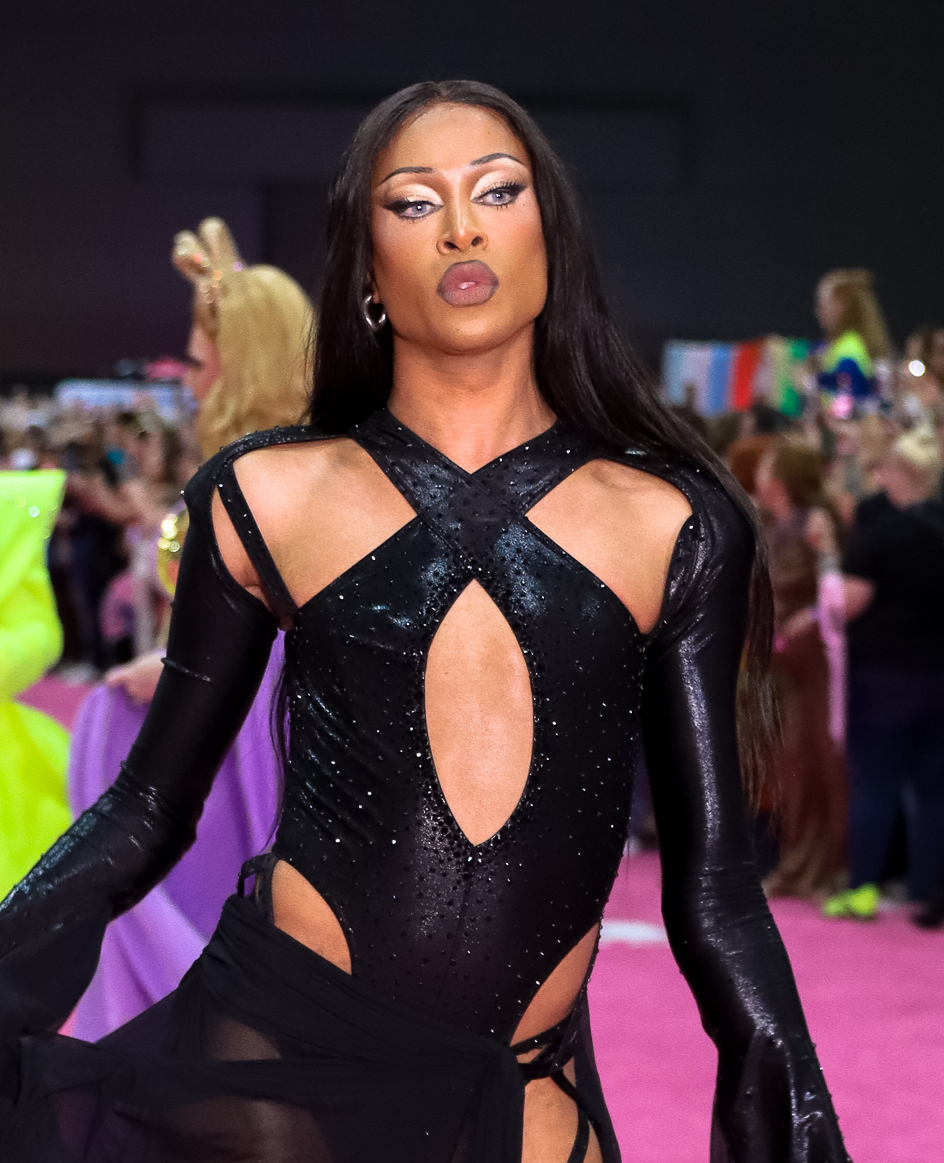
A'Whora (top left), Bimini Bon-Boulash (top right), Lawrence Chaney (bottom left), and Tayce (bottom right) formed United Kingdolls on the second series of RuPaul's Drag Race UK.

The second series (2021) saw the formation of the United Kingdolls on the fifth episode, "The RuRuvision Song Contest". Members included A'Whora, Bimini Bon-Boulash, Lawrence Chaney, and Tayce. The group performed "UK Hun?" and continued touring after the series aired. In his 2023 list of iconic moments on the series, Sim wrote, "Simply put, this is the best girl-groups performance of all time, from any Drag Race show, period." Similarly, he said in 2024: "It's not even up for debate that this is the best girl group of all time in the entire Drag Race franchise." The second series also saw Bimini Bon-Boulash, Ellie Diamond, Lawrence Chaney, and Tayce perform to "A Little Bit of Love".

The third series saw Choriza May, Ella Vaday, River Medway, and Vanity Milan win the fourth challenge with the girl group Pick 'n' Mix.

The fifth series had a challenge requiring two girl groups to perform to the original song "Don't Ick My Yum". Cara Melle, DeDeLicious, Michael Marouli, Tomara Thomas, and Vicki Vivacious formed Team Fierce Force Five, while Banksie, Ginger Johnson, Kate Butch, and Miss Naomi Carter formed The M-52's. Team Fierce Force Five won the challenge. On the sixth series, the girl groups Dracula's Child, consisting of Actavia, Chanel O'Conor, Kyran Thrax, Marmalade, and Zahirah Zapanta, and The Things, comprising Charra Tea, Kiki Snatch, La Voix, Lill, and Rileasa Slaves, wrote and performed original verses for the Halloween anthem, "Dead or Alive". On the seventh series, two groups performed the song "She Ate That".

==== RuPaul's Drag Race: UK vs. the World ====
Barry Levitt of Vulture said the Rusical on the second series of RuPaul's Drag Race: UK vs. the World was a girl group challenge due to the lack of narrative, and because each contest was required to write an original verse and perform as themself. Seven! Confessions of a Drag Queen was performed by Choriza May, Gothy Kendoll, Hannah Conda, La Grande Dame, Marina Summers, Scarlet Envy, and Tia Kofi.

The third series saw two girl groups sing "Im in Love with an Alien".

== See also ==
- DWV (group), American pop group with Detox and Willam Belli
- The AAA Girls, American drag queen supergroup with Alaska, Courtney Act, and Willam Belli
- List of best-selling girl groups
- List of girl groups
