= Zahirah Zapanta =

Filipino-British drag performer

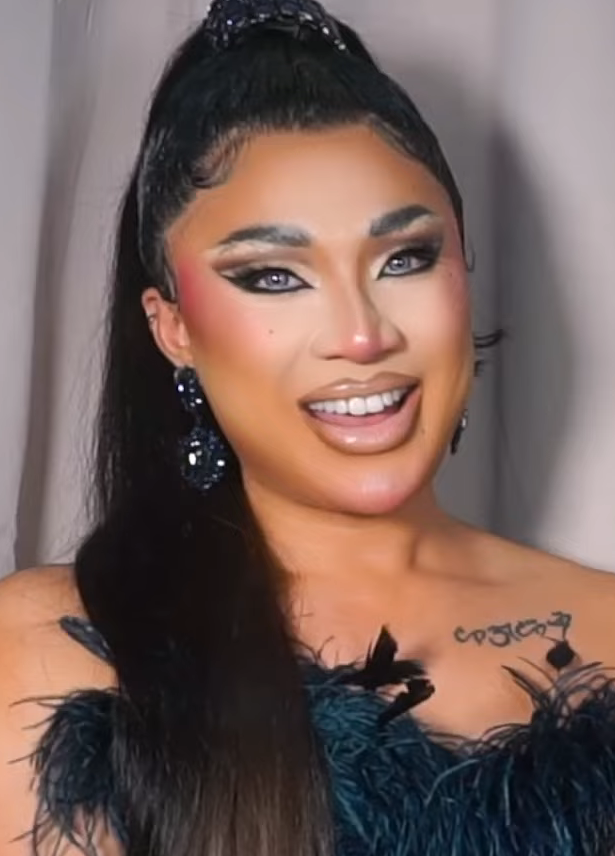
- Zahirah Zapanta in 2026
- Born: Marc Lemuel Ramos Zapanta; Philippines
- Occupation: Drag performer
- Television: RuPaul's Drag Race UK (series 6); RuPaul's Drag Race: UK vs. the World (series 3)

Marc Lemuel Ramos Zapanta, known professionally as Zahirah Zapanta, is a Filipino-born British drag performer who competed on the sixth series of RuPaul's Drag Race UK and the third series of RuPaul's Drag Race: UK vs. the World.

== Early life ==
Zapanta was born in the Philippines, and raised in Obando, Bulacan. His family moved to Nottingham when Zapanta was ten years old.

== Career ==
Drag performer Zahirah Zapanta competed on the sixth series of RuPaul's Drag Race UK. She and Saki Yew were the show's first two contestants of Filipino descent, and Zahirah Zapanta was the show's first to be born in the Philippines. Zahirah Zapanta placed tenth overall and has been described as a "fan favourite" by Attitude. She later competed on the third series of RuPaul's Drag Race: UK vs. the World.

In 2025, Zahirah Zapanta accused Manchester Pride of failing to compensate her and other performers.

== Personal life ==
Zapanta is based in Nottingham and uses the pronouns she/her in drag and he/him out of drag. Zapanta has said M1ss Jade So is a favorite contestant from the Drag Race franchise.

== Discography ==
=== Singles ===
- Enter the Void (2024)
- A-Z (feat. Actavia) (2024)
- "Dead or Alive" (2024), with Actavia, Chanel, Kyran Thrax, and Marmalade as Dracula's Child

== Filmography ==
- RuPaul's Drag Race UK (series 6; 2024)
- Strictly Come Dancing (series 22; 2024)
- RuPaul's Drag Race: UK vs. the World (series 3; 2026)

== See also ==
- List of drag queens
- List of people from Bulacan
- List of people from Nottingham
