= List of people from Bulacan =

This is a list of notable people from Bulacan, who are also known as Bulakenyos.

== National heroes and patriots ==
The early people of Bulacan, had also risen in revolt as in other parts of the country. Bulacan was one of the eight provinces, which rallied behind the Katipunan's call for an all-out insurrection against the Spanish occupation in the late 19th century.

- Marcelo H. del Pilar (Kupang, San Nicolas, Bulakan) – the "Great Propagandist" of the Philippine Propaganda Movement; editor in chief of Diariong Tagalog and La Solidaridad.
- General Gregorio del Pilar (San Jose, Bulakan) – Marcelo H. del Pilar's nephew, one of the youngest revolutionary generals during the Philippine Revolution and the Philippine–American War, died at the Battle of Tirad Pass.
- Mariano Ponce (Baliwag) – physician, Propagandist
- Pío Valenzuela (Polo) – physician, Katipunan leader, established Katipunan branches in Morong and Bulacan; co-founded "Kalayaan", the Katipunan newsletter; emissary of Andrés Bonifacio to José Rizal
- Trinidad Tecson (San Miguel de Mayumo) – female Katipunan revolutionary
- Felipe Buencamino, Sr. (San Miguel de Mayumo) – revolutionary, co-writer of the Constitution of the Philippine Republic at Malolos
- Commodore Ramon A. Alcaraz (Plaridel) – World War II veteran, Captain of Q-boat 112 ABRA Shot down 3 Japanese Zero fighters
- General Nicolas Capistrano (Angat) – lawyer, statesman and revolutionary general who fought against Americans in Cagayan de Misamis (now Cagayan de Oro) in Mindanao during Philippine-American War, notably the battles of Cagayan de Misamis, Agusan Hill and Macahambus Hill, all in 1900. He entered politics as a 2nd district congressman of then-undivided Misamis Province (1909-1912) and a senator of newly established 11th district shared with Jose Clarin, making him one of the most prominent men in what is now Cagayan de Oro, where he and his wife migrated to after 1895 to avoid arrest by the Spanish colonial government for his involvement in revolutionary activities and to start a new life there.

== Artists ==
Bulacan is also home to many of the country's greatest artists, with a good number elevated as National Artists.

- Katy de la Cruz (Bustos) – tagged as the Queen of Filipino Jazz and Bodabil
- Hermogenes Ilagan (Balagtas) – tenor, writer, stage actor, and playwright known as the Father of Philippine Zarzuela
- Francisco Balagtas, also known as or Francisco Baltazar (Panginay, Bigaa) – writer, author of Florante at Laura.
- Jose Corazon de Jesus (pen name "Huseng Batute"; Santa Maria, his father's hometown) – poet
- Basilio L. Sarmiento (Meycauayan) – poet
- Isidro Ancheta (San Miguel) – painter
- Constancio Bernardo (Obando) – painter and professor known for making the earliest modern geometric abstract paintings in the Philippines and in Southeast Asia.
- Nicanor Abelardo (San Miguel) – prolific composer of kundimans
- Francisco Santiago (Santa Maria) – kundiman composer
- Enya Gonzalez (Baliwag) – opera singer
- Cecile Licad – concert pianist
- Jess Santiago (Obando) – poet, songwriter, singer-composer, protest musician
- Rey Valera (Meycauayan) – singer, songwriter, music director, scorer
- Narcisa Doña Sisang de Leon (San Miguel) – film producer for LVN Films
- Michiko Yamamoto – screenwriter
- Carlos A. Santos-Viola (San Miguel) – architect known for designing churches for the Iglesia ni Cristo

The following artists were named as National Artists of the Philippines (listed in chronological order of membership):

- Francisca Reyes Aquino (Bocaue) – Dance (1973)
- Amado V. Hernández (Hagonoy) – Literature (1973, posthumous award)
- Guillermo Tolentino (Malolos) – Sculpture (1973)
- Gerardo de Leon – Film (1982)
- Honorata Atang dela Rama – Theater and Music (1987)
- Antonino Buenaventura (Baliwag) – Music (1988)
- Levi Celerio (Baliwag) – Music and Literature (1997)
- Ernani Cuenco – Music (2000, posthumous)
- Virgilio S. Almario (San Miguel) – Literature (2003)

== Scientists and inventors ==
- Geminiano T. De Ocampo (Malolos) – National Scientist of the Philippines for Ophthalmology
- Francisco O. Santos (Calumpit) – National Scientist of the Philippines for Human Nutrition and Agricultural Chemistry
- Virgilio Enriquez (Balagtas) – social psychologist known as Father of Filipino psychology "Ama ng Sikolohiyang Pilipino"

== Religious figures ==
- Dionisia de Santa María Mitas Talangpaz (Calumpit) – Roman Catholic Servant of God, native of Calumpit with Kapampangan blood from Macabebe and a candidate for sainthood.
- Cecilia Rosa de Jesús Talangpaz (Calumpit) – Roman Catholic Servant of God, native of Calumpit with a Kapampangan blood from Macabebe and a candidate for sainthood, and the sister of Bl. Dionisia.
- Bishop Ruperto Cruz Santos (born in San Rafael, Bulacan, October 30, 1957) – fourth Bishop of Balanga (April 1, 2010 – July 22, 2023; appointed to the position on Holy Thursday of 2010 in April 1, 2010 by Pope Benedict XVI and installed into office on July 8, 2010) and fifth Bishop of Antipolo (July 22, 2023–present).
- Bishop Francisco San Diego (born in Obando, Bulacan, October 10, 1935) – Second Bishop of the Diocese of San Pablo, Laguna and First Bishop of the Diocese of Pasig, Metro Manila.
- Bishop Pedro Bantigue y Natividad (born in Hagonoy, Bulacan) – former Auxiliary Bishop of the Roman Catholic Archdiocese of Manila and First Bishop of the Roman Catholic Diocese of San Pablo.
- Archbishop Leonardo Zamora Legaspi (born in Meycauayan, Bulacan, November 25, 1935) – first Filipino Rector Magnificus of the University of Santo Tomas, former Auxiliary Bishop of the Archdiocese of Manila, Catholic Bishops' Conference of the Philippines President (1987–1991) and the 33rd Bishop and third Archbishop of the Archdiocese of Caceres.
- Herminio Dagohoy, O.P. (Hagonoy) – 96th Rector Magnificus of the University of Santo Tomas (UST), the oldest and the largest Catholic university in Manila, Philippines.
- Sabino Vengco (Hagonoy) – Filipino priest, theologian, and author.
- Ma. Violeta Marcos, AMP (Pandi) – Filipino Roman Catholic nun best known as the co-founder and first director of the Augustinian Missionaries of the Philippines, and for her contributions to the resistance in opposition to the martial Law dictatorship of Ferdinand Marcos - first through her diocesan social action involvements in Negros Occidental, and later as part of the human rights organization Task Force Detainees of the Philippines.
- Daniel Razon (Calumpit) – Overall Servant of Members Church of God International, chairman and CEO of Breakthrough and Milestones Productions International Inc., TV/Radio Host.
- Bro. Eddie Villanueva (Bocaue) – Spiritual Leader of Jesus Is Lord Church and Chairman ZOE Broadcasting Network.

== Politicians, ambassadors and military officers ==
- Corazon C. Aquino (Malolos) – 1st Female President, Father born in Malolos City member of rich Cojuangco Clan
- Joseph Ejercito Estrada (Malolos) – 13th President of the Republic
- Blas Ople (Hagonoy) – Senator, journalist, secretary of Labor and Foreign Affairs
- Francisco "Soc" Rodrigo (Bulakan) – Former senator, member of the Philippine Constitutional Commission of 1986
- Gen. Alejo Santos (Bustos) – governor, secretary of National Defense during the Garcia Administration.
- Lt. General Rafael Ileto (Salacot, San Miguel, Bulacan) – served as the 22nd Secretary of the Department of National Defense (DND) of the Philippines. He also became the Vice-Chief of Staff of the Armed Forces of the Philippines (AFP). He also served as Philippine Ambassador to Turkey, Iran, Cambodia, Thailand, and Laos, Father of the Scout Rangers (AFP).
- Cardozo Luna (San Ildefonso) – Undersecretary of Department of National Defense, former Philippine Ambassador to the Netherlands, former Vice Chief of Staff and Lieutenant General of the Armed Forces of the Philippines
- Francisco Afan Delgado (Malolos) – Resident Commissioner to the United States House of Representatives (74th Congress) from the Philippine Islands January 3, 1935 – February 14, 1936; Philippine Ambassador to the United Nations, September 29, 1958 – January 1, 1962
- Joel Villanueva (Bocaue) – currently Senator, Former TESDA Director General
- Albert del Rosario (Bulacan) – Former Philippine Ambassador the United States and Secretary of Foreign Affairs. Great grandparents hail from Bulacan, Bulacan and his great grandmother, Teresa Sempio is the sister of Felipa Sempio, mother of Gregorio del Pilar
- Mar Roxas (San Miguel) – his grandmother was a member of De Leon clan, a rich clan in San Miguel
- Imelda Marcos (Baliwag) – Ferdinand Marcos' First Lady
- Daniel Fernando (Guiguinto) – Actor and currently the Bulacan Governor
- Alex Castro (Marilao) – actor, singer, model, currently the Bulacan Vice-Governor
- Herbert Bautista (Malolos) – former Mayor of Quezon City
- Crispin Beltran (San Jose del Monte) – Party-List Representative Anak Pawis
- Jose Maria Delgado (Malolos) – first Philippine Ambassador to the Vatican.
- Roberto Pagdanganan (Calumpit) – former governor, secretary of Agrarian Reform and Tourism
- Carlito Galvez Jr. (Bustos) – former Chief of Staff of the Armed Forces of the Philippines (AFP) during the Duterte Administration. He is also known for his leadership of the AFP Western Mindanao Command during the Battle of Marawi.
- Luzviminda Tancangco – also known as "Baby"; first non-lawyer and woman commissioner of the Philippine Commission on Elections. She was also its first female acting chairman (1998–1999).
- Rear Admiral Hilario Ruiz – former Flag Officer in Command of the Philippine Navy; one of Rolex 12 advisers of President Ferdinand Marcos during his martial law period; BRP Hilario Ruiz (PG-378), a coastal patrol boat of the Philippine Navy, is named after him.

== Beauty Queens ==
- Gemma Teresa Guerrero Cruz (Baliwag) – Miss International 1964
- Maricar Balagtas (Plaridel) – Miss Philippines Universe 2004, Miss Globe 2000
- Riza Santos (Malolos) – Miss Earth Canada 2006, Miss World Canada 2011
- Chelsea Anne Manalo (Meycauayan)- Miss Universe Philippines 2024, Miss Universe Asia 2024

== Other notable people ==
Popular celebrities, film, medical, television artists, models, etc.

- José R. Reyes (Malolos) – Filipino physician and hospital administrator. He served as the medical director of the North General Hospital in Manila, Philippines, from 1948 until his death in 1964
- Cheche Lazaro – TV host, and chairman and CEO of Probe Productions Inc.
- Dely Magpayo ("Tita Dely") – radio host
- Yul Servo (Baliwag) – Manila City Vice Mayor and former Congressman
- Mark Leviste (Baliwag City) – Vice Governor of Batangas
- Regine Velasquez (Balagtas and Guiguinto) – singer (Asia's Songbird), actress, host
- Cris Villanueva (Baliwag City) – actor
- Empoy Marquez (Baliwag City) – comedian, actor
- Bert 'Tawa' Marcelo (Baliwag City) – comedian
- Melanie Calumpad (Kyla) (Calumpit) – singer, actress
- Jamie Rivera (Pulilan) – singer, Roman Catholic gospel song inspirational diva
- Jolina Magdangal (Hagonoy) – singer, actress, entrepreneur, TV host
- Cheryl Cosim (Hagonoy) – news anchor, reporter, radio broadcaster
- Joey de Leon (Malolos) – TV host (notably of Eat Bulaga!), comedian, singer, and songwriter
- Evette Palaban (Malolos) – dancer
- Orange and Lemons (Baliwag/Plaridel)
- Rosemarie Joy Garcia (Diana Zubiri) – movie and television actress, model
- Ella Cruz (Angat) – child actress
- Jewel Mische (Bocaue) – actress, Starstruck survivor
- Maricar Balagtas (Plaridel) – beauty queen
- Vergel Meneses (Malolos) – professional basketball player
- Lydia de Vega (Meycauayan) – track and field athlete, Asian Games medalist
- Billy Mamaril (Bocaue) – professional basketball player
- Teresita "Mama Sita" Reyes (Malolos) – chef, producer of culinary products
- Florentino V. Floro – former judge
- Rodney Santos – professional basketball player
- Reynold "Pooh" Garcia (San Jose del Monte) – comedian, singer
- Bob Dela Cruz (Marilao) – Pinoy Big Brother Season 1 housemate
- Mcoy Fundales (Baliwag City) – frontman/singer for the band Orange and Lemons, and Kenyo /Pinoy Big Brother Celebrity Edition 2 housemate
- Angelica Colmenares (Angel Locsin) (Santa Maria) – television and film actress
- Alfred Vargas (Santa Maria) – actor, Representative of 5th district of Quezon City
- Bryan Termulo (Santa Maria) – singer
- Ferdinand Clemente a.k.a. Makata Tawanan (Hagonoy) – segment host (Balitaang Tapat, Good Morning Club on TV5)
- Krystal Reyes (Santa Maria) – child actress
- Escabeche (Bustos)
- Joyce Ching (San Ildefonso) – actress
- Rodrigo Jr Saturay (San Ildefonso) – Singer, Spiritual Leader
- Jon Avila (San Ildefonso) – actor
- Maine Mendoza (Santa Maria) – Dubsmash Queen of the Philippines, Comedian, YouTube Sensation
- Sharlene San Pedro (Pulilan) – Actress, Myx Vj
- Tristan Ramirez (Pandi) – singer, Pinoy Boyband Superstar winner, BoybandPH member.
- Mika Reyes (Pulilan) – Former De La Salle University Lady Spikers, Volleyball player
- Nikko Natividad (Malolos) – actor, dancer, member of Hashtags
- Euwenn Mikaell (Meycauayan) – artist
- Roel Cortez (Meycauayan) – singer, songwriter
- Mo Twister (San Rafael) – radio host
- RJ Nieto a.k.a. Thinking Pinoy (San Rafael) – Vlogger, Radio host, columnist
- Zaijian Jaranilla (Bocaue and San Rafael) – Filipino actor and model having primary allegiance with ABS-CBN Corporation under Star Magic and secondary allegiance conditionally with other media companies (GMA Network and TV5 Network) who is best known for his role as the orphan Santino in the 2009–2013 ABS-CBN religious-themed teleserye, May Bukas Pa. He studied senior high school at Colegio de San Juan de Dios, celebrated the school's 10th anniversary, and obtained his Land Transportation Office (LTO) driving license.
- Rans Rifol (Meycauayan) – actress, former member of MNL48
- Roel Cortez (Meycauayan) – singer, songwriter
