= Lill (drag queen) =

British drag performer

- Television: RuPaul's Drag Race UK

Lill is the stage name of Lill Redmond, a British drag queen best known for competing on the sixth series of RuPaul's Drag Race UK.

== Career ==
Lill is a member of the Family Gorgeous, along with previous RuPaul's Drag Race UK contestants Cheddar Gorgeous and Banksie. She appeared on the Channel 4 show Drag SOS in 2019. In 2024, Lill competed in the sixth series of RuPaul's Drag Race UK. She eliminated Zahirah Zapanta and Actavia from the competition. She was eliminated by Rileasa Slaves after the semi-final roast challenge, finishing in fifth place.

== Personal life ==
Lill is based in Manchester. Lill uses the pronouns she/her in drag and they/them out of drag.
