= RuPaul's Drag Race UK series 6 =

2024 series of RuPaul's Drag Race UK

RuPaul's Drag Race UK
- Series 6
- Promotional poster for Series 6
- Hosted by: RuPaul
- Judges: RuPaul; Michelle Visage; Alan Carr; Graham Norton
- No. of contestants: 12
- Winner: Kyran Thrax
- Runner-up: La Voix
- Miss Congeniality: Charra Tea
- No. of episodes: 10

Release
- Original network: BBC Three / BBC One (UK); WOW Presents Plus (International)
- Original release: 26 September – 28 November 2024

Season chronology
- ← Previous; Series 5 Next → Series 7

The sixth series of RuPaul's Drag Race UK aired on BBC Three on 26 September 2024. RuPaul returned to his role as main host and head judge, and was again joined on the judging panel by Michelle Visage, Alan Carr and Graham Norton, all of whom returned for their respective sixth series. The series began filming in January 2024.

== Production ==
On 22 September 2023, prior to the beginning of the fifth series it was announced via the shows social media pages that casting for the sixth series was now open. Applications remained open for four weeks until closing on 20 October 2023.

The sixth series of the show began filming in January 2024. On 23 August 2024, the first teaser for the series was revealed, which featured the caption "Confidential: For Your Eyelashes Only", followed by a brief visual depicting satellite footage of Earth, before zooming into a city landscape with a further caption stating "Prepare Your Engines". On 27 August 2024, the BBC revealed the promotional poster for the series featuring RuPaul, as well as the list of guest judges, which included AJ Odudu, Alison Goldfrapp, Amanda Holden, Beverley Knight, Claire Richards, Mabel, Siobhán McSweeney and Simon Le Bon, as well as Kristen McMenamy, who served as a guest judge on the first episode of the previous series. Alexandra Burke, Aaron Renfree and Claudimar Neto were also announced as special guests for this series.

This season of RuPaul's Drag Race UK is notable for being the first in the franchise to feature a cash prize, with the winner receiving £25,000.

== Contestants ==
Ages, names, and cities stated are at time of filming.

Contestants of RuPaul's Drag Race UK series 6 and their backgrounds
Contestant	Age	Hometown	Outcome
Kyran Thrax	26	Chorley, England	Winner
La Voix	43	Stockton-on-Tees, England	Runner-up
Marmalade	25	Cardiff, Wales	3rd place
Rileasa Slaves	32	London, England	3rd place
Lill	36	Manchester, England	5th place
Charra Tea	23	Belfast, Northern Ireland	6th place (Note: Charra Tea was voted Miss Congeniality by fellow contestants.)
Actavia	21	Bala, Wales	7th place
Chanel O'Conor	25	Rothesay, Scotland	8th place
Kiki Snatch	25	London, England	9th place
Zahirah Zapanta	28	Nottingham, England	10th place
Dita Garbo	48	Folkestone, England	11th place
Saki Yew	33	Manchester, England	12th place (Note: Saki Yew was forced to withdraw from the competition due to a knee injury.)

== Contestant progress ==
Legend:

Kyran Thrax won RuPaul's Drag Race UK series 6.
La Voix was the runner-up.
Charra Tea was voted Miss Congeniality (Miss C) by fellow contestants.
WIN indicates that the contestant won the challenge.
TOP2 and TOP3 indicate that the contestant was one of the best performing in the challenge, but lost the lip sync to win it.
SAFE indicates that the contestant was declared safe by the judges.
IMM (Immunity) indicates that Kyran Thrax won the first challenge and was immune from elimination the following week.
BTM (Bottom) indicates that the contestant was up for elimination.
ELIM (Eliminated) indicates that the contestant was eliminated.
WDR (Withdraw) indicates that Saki Yew was removed from the competition due to injury.
Guest indicates that the contestant returned as a guest.

Contestants progress with placements in each episode
Contestant	Episode									
Contestant	1	2 (Note: In episode 2, Actavia and Kiki Snatch were announced as bottom two of the week. However, it was later announced that, due to Saki's withdrawal, there would be no further eliminations.)	3	4	5	6	7	8	9	10
Kyran Thrax	WIN	IMM	WIN	SAFE	SAFE	WIN	SAFE	SAFE	SAFE	Winner
La Voix	TOP2	SAFE	SAFE	SAFE	WIN	WIN	WIN	SAFE	WIN	Runner-up
Marmalade	SAFE	TOP3	SAFE	SAFE	SAFE	SAFE	SAFE	WIN	SAFE	Eliminated
Rileasa Slaves	SAFE	SAFE	SAFE	WIN	SAFE	BTM	SAFE	BTM	BTM	Eliminated
Lill	SAFE	WIN	SAFE	BTM	SAFE	SAFE	BTM	SAFE	ELIM	Guest
Charra Tea	SAFE	SAFE	SAFE	SAFE	SAFE	SAFE	SAFE	ELIM	Guest	Miss C
Actavia	SAFE	BTM	SAFE	SAFE	BTM	SAFE	ELIM		Guest	Guest
Chanel O'Conor	SAFE	TOP3	SAFE	SAFE	SAFE	ELIM			Guest	Guest
Kiki Snatch	SAFE	BTM	BTM	SAFE	ELIM				Guest	Guest
Zahirah Zapanta	SAFE	SAFE	SAFE	ELIM					Guest	Guest
Dita Garbo	SAFE	SAFE	ELIM						Guest	Guest
Saki Yew	SAFE	WDR							Guest	Guest

== Lip syncs ==
Legend:

The contestant won the lip sync to win the challenge.
The contestant was eliminated after their first time in the bottom.
The contestant was eliminated after their third time in the bottom.
The contestant won the Lip Sync for the Crown and was declared the winner of the season.

Episode	Top contestants			Song	Winner
1	Kyran Thrax	vs.	La Voix	"Ooh La La" (Goldfrapp)	Kyran Thrax
2	Chanel O'Conor vs. Lill vs. Marmalade			"Tension" (Kylie Minogue)	Lill
Episode	Bottom contestants			Song	Eliminated
3	Dita Garbo	vs.	Kiki Snatch	"Girls on Film" (Duran Duran)	Dita Garbo
4	Lill	vs.	Zahirah Zapanta	"Don't Call Me Up" (Mabel)	Zahirah Zapanta
5	Actavia	vs.	Kiki Snatch	"Let's Dance" (David Bowie)	Kiki Snatch
6	Chanel O'Conor	vs.	Rileasa Slaves	"Something Kinda Ooooh" (Girls Aloud)	Chanel O'Conor
7	Actavia	vs.	Lill	"Time Warp" (Cast of The Rocky Horror Picture Show)	Actavia
8	Charra Tea	vs.	Rileasa Slaves	"Never Gonna Give You Up" (Rick Astley)	Charra Tea
9	Lill	vs.	Rileasa Slaves	"Crazy What Love Can Do" (David Guetta, Becky Hill, Ella Henderson)	Lill
Episode	Final contestants			Song	Winner
10	Kyran Thrax	vs.	La Voix	"Don't Stop Me Now" (Queen)	Kyran Thrax

== Guest judges ==
Listed in chronological order:

- Alison Goldfrapp, musician and record producer
- Kristen McMenamy, model
- Simon Le Bon, singer
- Mabel, singer-songwriter
- Claire Richards, singer
- Amanda Holden, actress and television judge
- Beverley Knight, singer and actress
- AJ Odudu, television presenter
- Siobhán McSweeney, actress

=== Special guests ===
Guests who appeared in episodes, but did not judge on the main stage.

Episode 4

- Alexandra Burke, singer-songwriter and actress
- Ian Masterson, record producer and songwriter

Episode 5

- Raven, runner-up on both RuPaul's Drag Race Season 2 and All Stars 1

Episode 6

- Jon Lee, singer and actor
- Rachel Stevens, singer and actress

Episode 7

- Claudimar Neto, dancer and choreographer
- Jono McNeil, vocal coach

Episode 9

- Ella Vaday, runner-up of RuPaul's Drag Race UK Series 3
- Michael Marouli, runner-up of RuPaul's Drag Race UK Series 5

Episode 10

- Aaron Renfree, dancer and choreographer
- Ginger Johnson, winner of RuPaul's Drag Race UK Series 5

== Episodes ==
No. overall	No. in series	Title	Original release date
49	1	"Cabaret Talent Show"	26 September 2024
Twelve new queens enter the werkroom. For the first main challenge, the queens will perform a talent show in the Tickety Boo Cabaret Club.: Actavia – Original song; Chanel O'Conor – Live singing and comedy; Charra Tea – Comedy performance; Dita Garbo – Original song; Kiki Snatch – Live singing; Kyran Thrax – Original song; La Voix – Live singing; Lill – Comedy routine; Marmalade – Monologue performance; Rileasa Slaves – Original song; Saki Yew – Burlesque; Zahirah Zapanta – Original song; On the runway, category is Queen of Your Hometown. Actavia, Kiki Snatch, Rileasa Slaves, Lill, La Voix and Kyran Thrax receive positive critiques. It is announced that Kyran Thrax and La Voix are the top two queens of the week and will lip-sync for the win. They lip-sync to "Ooh La La" by Goldfrapp. After the lip sync, Kyran Thrax is announced as the winner of the challenge. RuPaul then announces that no one is going home.: Guest Judge: Alison Goldfrapp; Alternating Judge: Alan Carr; Main Challenge: Perform a talent show in the Tickety Boo Cabaret Club; Runway Theme: Queen of Your Hometown; Top Two: Kyran Thrax and La Voix; Lip-Sync Song: "Ooh La La" by Goldfrapp; Challenge Winner: Kyran Thrax; Main challenge prize: Immunity for next week's challenge; Eliminated: None
50	2	"Stitch & Strut"	3 October 2024
For this week's main challenge, the queens team up to create a three-piece fashion collection using household materials. Before the runway begins, Saki Yew announces to the group that she will be leaving the competition due to a knee injury.: Haus of Mirrors (Disco Room): Dita Garbo (Lady Boss), Rileasa Slaves (Red Carpet) and Saki Yew (Cocktail Party); The House of Kard$ (Game Room): Actavia (Red Carpet), Kyran Thrax (Lady Boss) and Zahirah Zapanta (Cocktail Party); The House of Cellar McCartney (Michelle's Room): Charra Tea (Cocktail Party), Kiki Snatch (Red Carpet) and La Voix (Lady Boss); Haus of Zen (Spa Room): Chanel O'Conor (Cocktail Party), Lill (Lady Boss) and Marmalade (Red Carpet); On the runway, categories are Cocktail Party, Lady Boss and Red Carpet. Chanel O'Conor, Lill and Marmalade receive positive critiques. Actavia, Kiki Snatch and Zahirah Zapanta negative critiques. It is announced that, Actavia and Kiki Snatch are the bottom 2, but due to Saki's departure, there would be no further elimination, and instead, Chanel O'Conor, Lill and Marmalade are the top three queens of the week and will lip-sync for the win. Chanel O'Conor, Lill and Marmalade lip-synced to "Tension" by Kylie Minogue. After the lip-sync, Lill is announced as the winner of the challenge.: Guest Judge: Kristen McMenamy; Alternating Judge: Graham Norton; Withdrew: Saki Yew; Main Challenge: In teams, create a three-piece fashion collection using household materials; Runway Themes: Cocktail Party, Lady Boss and Red Carpet; Top Three: Chanel O'Conor, Lill and Marmalade; Lip-Sync Song: "Tension" by Kylie Minogue; Challenge Winner: Lill; Eliminated: None
51	3	"Brit-flicks"	10 October 2024
For this week's mini-challenge, the queens share their Dirty Laundry in the categories Perky: Giving The Best Vibe, Pants: The Weakest Competition, Basic: The Most Basic, Wet Blanket: The Girl Who Needs to Have More Fun, Stomping On The Competition: The Strongest Competitor and Big Headed: The Biggest Ego. Zahirah Zapanta, Charra Tea, Zahira Zapanta, Chanel O'Conor, Kyran Thrax and La Voix win each category, respectively. For the main challenge, the queens act in British movie trailer rom-coms.: Hate Actually: Chanel O'Conor, Kyran Thrax, La Voix, Lill, Rileasa Slaves, and Zahirah Zapanta; Forty Funerals and a Wedding: Actavia, Charra Tea, Dita Garbo, Kiki Snatch, and Marmalade; On the runway, category is New Romantics. Kyran Thrax, Marmalade and Rileasa Slaves receive positive critiques, with Kyran Thrax winning the challenge. Dita Garbo, Kiki Snatch and Zahirah Zapanta receive negative critiques, with Zahirah Zapanta being safe. Dita Garbo and Kiki Snatch lip-sync to "Girls on Film" by Duran Duran. Kiki Snatch wins the lip-sync and Dita Garbo is the first queen to sashay away.: Guest Judge: Simon Le Bon; Alternating Judge: Alan Carr; Mini-Challenge: Dirty Laundry; Mini-Challenge Winner: Zahirah Zapanta, Charra Tea, Chanel O'Conor, Kyran Thrax and La Voix; Main Challenge: Act in British movie trailer rom-coms; Runway Theme: New Romantics; Challenge Winner: Kyran Thrax; Bottom Two: Dita Garbo and Kiki Snatch; Lip-Sync Song: "Girls on Film" by Duran Duran; Eliminated: Dita Garbo; Farewell Message: "Dita Dita Da-Da-Da-Dita Season 6 scary love you all Dita x"
52	4	"Ghoul Power"	17 October 2024
For this week's main challenge, the queens write, record, and perform verses to "Dead or Alive".: Team The Things: Charra Tea, Kiki Snatch, La Voix, Lill, and Rileasa Slaves; Team Dracula's Child: Actavia, Chanel O'Conor, Kyran Thrax, Marmalade, and Zahirah Zapanta; On the runway, category is Call Me Mother Nature. Kiki Snatch, Kyran Thrax and Rileasa Slaves receive positive critiques, with Rileasa Slaves winning the challenge. Lill, Marmalade and Zahirah Zapanta receive negative critiques, with Marmalade being safe. Lill and Zahirah Zapanta lip-sync to "Don't Call Me Up" by Mabel. Lill wins the lip-sync and Zahirah Zapanta sashays away.: Guest Judge: Mabel; Alternating Judge: Graham Norton; Main Challenge: Write, record, and perform verses to "Dead or Alive"; Runway Theme: Call Me Mother Nature; Challenge Winner: Rileasa Slaves; Bottom Two: Lill and Zahirah Zapanta; Lip-Sync Song: "Don't Call Me Up" by Mabel; Eliminated: Zahirah Zapanta; Farewell Message: "Enter the void with me! Zahirah xoxo"
53	5	"Sofa Showdown"	24 October 2024
For this week's mini-challenge, the queens try to make RuPaul and Raven laugh while sitting in a pink furry chair. Kiki Snatch wins the mini-challenge. For the main challenge, the queens team up and improvise in a live episode of The Graham Norton Show.: Team 1: Kiki Snatch, Kyran Thrax, La Voix, Lill and Marmalade; Team 2: Actavia, Chanel O'Conor, Charra Tea and Rileasa Slaves; On the runway, category is How's Your Headpiece? La Voix, Lill and Marmalade receive positive critiques, with La Voix winning the challenge. Actavia, Charra Tea and Kiki Snatch receive negative critiques, with Charra Tea being safe. Actavia and Kiki Snatch lip-sync to "Let's Dance" by David Bowie. Actavia wins the lip-sync and Kiki Snatch sashays away.: Guest Judge: Claire Richards; Alternating Judge: Graham Norton; Mini-Challenge: Pink Furry Chair: Make RuPaul and Raven laugh; Mini-Challenge Winner: Kiki Snatch; Main Challenge: In teams, improvise in a live episode of The Graham Norton Show; Runway Theme: How's Your Headpiece?; Challenge Winner: La Voix; Bottom Two: Actavia and Kiki Snatch; Lip-Sync Song: "Let's Dance" by David Bowie; Eliminated: Kiki Snatch; Farewell Message: "Love having y'all as my season 6 sisters. Stay Fierce, Stay Fabulous and Stay Snatched! x x"
54	6	"Snatch Game"	31 October 2024
For this week's mini-challenge, the queens read each other to filth. La Voix wins the mini-challenge. For the main challenge, the queens play the Snatch Game. Jon Lee and Rachel Stevens star as the celebrity contestants. The cast consisted of: Actavia as the Welsh Dragon (credited as the Welsh Drag-On); Chanel O' Conor as Miss Coco Peru; Charra Tea as Nadine Coyle (as Mary Poppins from the musical of the same name); Kyran Thrax as Elvis Presley; La Voix as Liza Minnelli; Lill as Queen Victoria; Marmalade as Marie Antoinette; Rileasa Slaves as Rihanna (as Sami from Hate Actually); On the runway, category is Doctor Who Is She? Charra Tea, Kyran Thrax and La Voix, receive positive critiques, with Kyran Thrax and La Voix winning the challenge. Actavia, Chanel O'Conor and Rileasa Slaves receive negative critiques, with Actavia being safe. Chanel O'Conor and Rileasa Slaves lip-sync to "Something Kinda Ooooh" by Girls Aloud. Rileasa Slaves wins the lip-sync and Chanel O'Conor sashays away.: Guest Judge: Amanda Holden; Alternating Judge: Alan Carr; Mini-Challenge: Reading is Fundamental; Mini-Challenge Winner: La Voix; Main Challenge: Snatch Game; Runway Theme: Doctor Who Is She?; Challenge Winners: Kyran Thrax and La Voix; Bottom Two: Chanel O'Conor and Rileasa Slaves; Lip-Sync Song: "Something Kinda Ooooh" by Girls Aloud; Eliminated: Chanel O'Conor; Farewell Message: "In the beginning, I was born on a dirt farm in my motherland of Scotland with only straw to keep me warm... Point of the story is I love you all to Austria and back. See you soon. Big love, Chanel O'Conor xxx"
55	7	"Pop of the Tops - Live: The Rusical"	7 November 2024
For this week's main challenge, the queens perform in Pop of the Tops - Live: The Rusical.: Actavia plays Geri Halliwell; Charra Tea as Kylie Minogue; Kyran Thrax as George Michael; La Voix as Dame Shirley Bassey; Lill as Cilla Black; Marmalade as Sir Elton John; Rileasa Slaves as Adele; On the runway, category is Night of a Thousand Princess Dianas. Kyran Thrax, La Voix, Marmalade and Rileasa Slaves receive positive critiques, with La Voix winning the challenge. Actavia, Charra Tea and Lill receive negative critiques, with Charra Tea being safe. Actavia and Lill lip-sync to "Time Warp" by the cast of The Rocky Horror Picture Show. Lill wins the lip-sync and Actavia sashays away.: Guest Judge: Beverley Knight; Alternating Judge: Graham Norton; Main Challenge: Pop of the Tops - Live: The Rusical; Runway Theme: Night of a Thousand Princess Dianas; Challenge Winner: La Voix; Bottom Two: Actavia and Lill; Lip-Sync Song: "Time Warp" by the Cast of The Rocky Horror Picture Show; Eliminated: Actavia; Farewell Message: "Just like the Yoggy, I'm good 4 your gut! THANK U! LOVE YOU ALL loads!!!! Kill it! 💋 ACCY!! x♡"
56	8	"All in the Drag Family"	14 November 2024
For this week's main challenge, the queens makeover their loved ones. On the runway, category is Drag Family Resemblance. Kyran Thrax, La Voix, Lill and Marmalade receive positive critiques, with Marmalade winning the challenge. Charra Tea and Rileasa Slaves receive negative critiques, and are announced as the bottom two. They lip-sync to "Never Gonna Give You Up" by Rick Astley. Rileasa Slaves wins the lip-sync and Charra Tea sashays away.: Guest Judge: AJ Odudu; Alternating Judge: Alan Carr; Main Challenge: Makeover a loved one; Runway Theme: Drag Family Resemblance; Challenge Winner: Marmalade; Bottom Two: Charra Tea and Rileasa Slaves; Lip-Sync Song: "Never Gonna Give You Up" by Rick Astley; Eliminated: Charra Tea; Farewell Message: "Red, Yellow, Blue, I will miss you (all) 🐝 WASP! Love y'all so much!"
57	9	"Send in the Clowns"	21 November 2024
For this week's main challenge, the queens will perform a roast of the judges and the eliminated queens of Series 6 while dressed as clowns. On the runway, category is Semi-Final Vinyl. La Voix wins the challenge. Lill and Rileasa Slaves receive negative critiques, and are announced as the bottom two. They lip-sync to "Crazy What Love Can Do" by David Guetta, Becky Hill and Ella Henderson. Rileasa Slaves wins the lip-sync and Lill sashays away.: Guest Judge: Siobhán McSweeney; Alternating Judge: Alan Carr; Main Challenge: Perform a roast of the judges and the eliminated queens of Series 6; Runway Theme: Semi-Final Vinyl; Challenge Winner: La Voix; Bottom Two: Lill and Rileasa Slaves; Lip-Sync Song: "Crazy What Love Can Do" by David Guetta, Becky Hill and Ella Henderson; Eliminated: Lill; Farewell Message: "HAR HAR more choreo for you! Best top 4 ever! Good luck gals. All my love, Lill x"
58	10	"Grand Finale"	28 November 2024
For the final challenge of the season, the queens write, record and perform their own verses to the original song, "A Different Winner's Story". On the runway, category is Grand Finale Eleganza. The eliminated queens all return to the runway, where it is announced that Charra Tea is this season's Miss Congeniality. Marmalade and Rileasa Slaves are eliminated, leaving Kyran Thrax and La Voix as the top two queens of the season. They lip-sync to "Don't Stop Me Now" by Queen. It is announced that Kyran Thrax is the winner, leaving La Voix as the runner-up.: Alternating Judges: Alan Carr and Graham Norton; Main Challenge: Write, record and perform their own verses to the original song "A Different Winner's Story"; Runway Theme: Grand Finale Eleganza; Miss Congeniality: Charra Tea; Eliminated: Marmalade and Rileasa Slaves; Final Two: Kyran Thrax and La Voix; Lip-Sync Song: "Don't Stop Me Now" by Queen; Runner-up: La Voix; Winner of RuPaul's Drag Race UK Series Six: Kyran Thrax

== See also ==
- Drag Race
- Drag Queen
