= La Voix (drag queen) =

British drag queen and singer (born 1980)

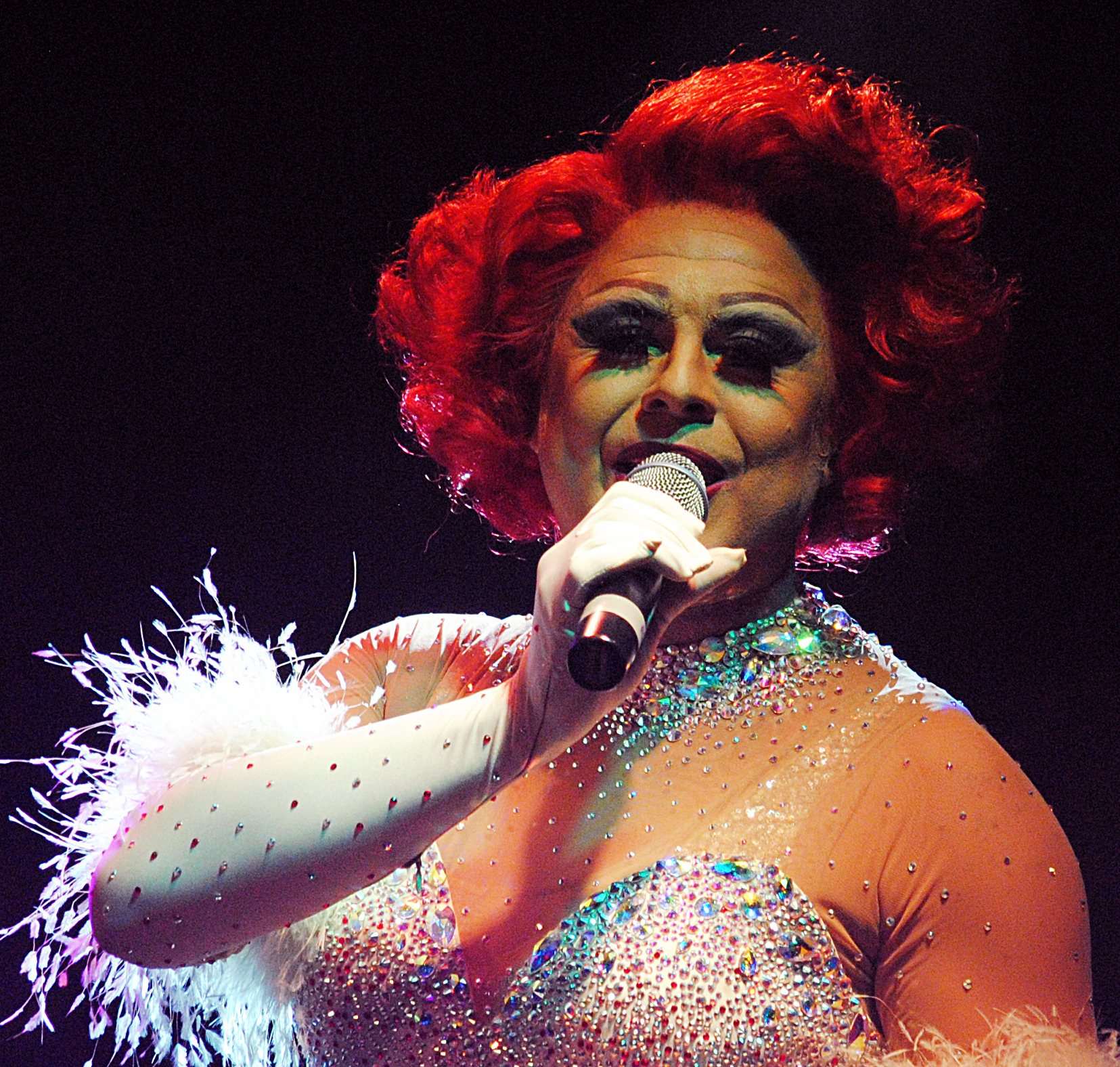
- La Voix in 2014
- Born: Christopher Dennis; 17 April 1980 (age 46); Stockton-on-Tees, County Durham, England
- Education: Brunel University
- Occupation: Drag queen
- Notable work: Britain's Got Talent series 8
- Television: Queen of the Universe (season 1); RuPaul's Drag Race UK (series 6)
- Website: lavoix.co.uk

La Voix (born 17 April 1980) is the stage name of Christopher Dennis, a British drag performer and singer best known for competing on Britain's Got Talent and Queen of the Universe, as well as serving as a mentor on Queens for the Night, being runner-up on the sixth series of RuPaul's Drag Race UK and competed on Strictly Come Dancing 2025 with Aljaž Škorjanec.

== Early life and education ==
Dennis grew up in Stockton-on-Tees. His parents were both nurses, and he grew up in a care home where they later worked. He attended Butts Lane Primary School and later Egglescliffe School.

Dennis has described his first performance in drag as taking place at a primary school talent show, where he dressed as Karen Carpenter and lip-synced to "Top of the World". He recalled that the positive reaction from the audience encouraged his interest in entertaining and performing. His father later recalled that Dennis had been regularly performing from around the age of 15.

At 17, Dennis joined the National Youth Theatre. He moved to London at 18 to pursue a career in performance, studying drama at Brunel University of London before training in musical theatre at the Urdang Academy.

== Career ==
After completing his drama and musical theatre training, Dennis worked as a stage and celebrity make-up artist. He later worked at the Soho cabaret venue Madame Jojo's, performing songs associated with Shirley Bassey and Liza Minnelli. Dennis has described this period as the beginning of La Voix and has said that working in cabaret helped him develop his comedy and audience interaction. La Voix subsequently built a career in cabaret, pantomime and cruise-ship entertainment; by 2026, Dennis estimated that he had performed on around 130 cruises. He has also worked as a presenter on BBC Three Counties Radio.

La Voix won Drag Idol UK in 2012. In 2014, she won Best Drag Act at the London Cabaret Awards. That year she also competed on the eighth series of Britain's Got Talent, fronting La Voix and the London Gay Big Band, and reached the semi-finals.

In May 2015, La Voix reached the final two of RuPaul's Drag Race UK Ambassador, a competition judged by RuPaul, Jonathan Ross and Katie Price. She finished as runner-up to The Vivienne, who was named the inaugural UK Drag Race Ambassador.

In 2016, La Voix appeared as a featured drag artist in Absolutely Fabulous: The Movie and brought her one-woman show Diva Breakdown to the Ambassadors Theatre in London's West End, followed by performances in Manchester and Birmingham and a UK tour. She later hosted the live interview show La Voix Meets, interviewing guests including Dawn French, Joanna Lumley, Su Pollard and Vanessa Feltz, and performed for members of the British royal family at New Year's Eve events.

In 2021, La Voix competed in the first season of the international drag singing competition Queen of the Universe. The following year, she appeared as a drag mentor on the ITV programme Queens for the Night. In September 2023, her tour van was stolen with costumes, wigs and equipment inside. The vehicle was later recovered with none of its contents having been taken.

In 2024, La Voix competed on the sixth series of RuPaul's Drag Race UK. She earned four RuPeter badges and finished as runner-up to Kyran Thrax. Her challenge wins included the Snatch Game and the live-singing Rusical challenge "Pop of the Tops – Live: The Rusical".

In 2025, La Voix expanded into music and cosmetics. She released the EP The Show Isn't Over in March, and launched her own range of make-up products in June, including her signature "Ooh La La" red lipstick. In July, she performed on the main Trafalgar Square stage at Pride in London, on a bill headlined by Chaka Khan.

In August 2025, La Voix was announced as a contestant on the twenty-third series of Strictly Come Dancing, becoming the first drag queen to compete in a full-length series of the programme. She was partnered with professional dancer Aljaž Škorjanec. During Blackpool week in November, La Voix sustained an injury and was unable to perform. On 22 November, following further medical advice, she withdrew from the competition.

In May 2026, La Voix served as the United Kingdom's jury spokesperson for the Eurovision Song Contest 2026, announcing the UK jury's points during the grand final from Salford. During 2026, she also made multiple appearances on ITV's This Morning presenting the programme's showbusiness news.

La Voix made her professional musical-theatre debut as Miss Hannigan in selected dates of the 2026 UK and Ireland tour of Annie, appearing in Wimbledon, Birmingham, Manchester, Plymouth and Canterbury. In July 2026, she guest-starred as herself in a Pride-themed episode of the BBC One soap opera EastEnders. Her scenes included an improvised performance at the Queen Victoria, after producers encouraged her to treat the filming as a live comedy performance and interact with the characters as an audience.

== Personal life ==
Dennis is gay and has credited his parents with being supportive of both his sexuality and his career. He uses she/her pronouns in drag and he/him pronouns out of drag.

Dennis's father, Richard, appeared alongside him in the family makeover challenge on the sixth series of RuPaul's Drag Race UK, where he was transformed into the drag character "Voix La". Dennis later said that appearing on the programme together had brought them closer as a family and led to conversations they had never previously had. Richard subsequently joined La Voix at Pride events and on tour.

Dennis's mother died in April 2025. During his participation in Strictly Come Dancing later that year, he spoke about her death and dedicated his Couple's Choice routine to his parents, describing his mother as having been equally supportive of his career. Dennis has described himself as having been very close to his mother and has said that the women he grew up around were a significant influence on both him and the creation of La Voix.

Dennis is engaged to Luke, who has also worked as La Voix's long-time tour manager. Dennis has credited him with providing support backstage throughout his career.

== Filmography ==
Year	Title	Notes	Ref.
2007	Britain's Got Talent	Contestant; series 1; member of The Kit Kat Dolls	
2007	The Friday Night Project	Guest performer; appeared as a Liza Minnelli impersonator and performed with David Gest	
2014	Britain's Got Talent	Contestant; series 8	
2016	Absolutely Fabulous: The Movie	Featured drag artist	
2021	Queen of the Universe	Contestant; season 1	
2022	This Morning	Guest; appeared alongside Lorraine Kelly and Kitty Scott-Claus to promote Queens for the Night	
2022	Queens for the Night	Drag mentor	
2023	Pointless Celebrities	Contestant; celebrity special	
2024	RuPaul's Drag Race UK	Contestant; runner-up; series 6	
2025	The Weakest Link	Celebrity contestant	
2025	RuPaul's Drag Race UK	Special guest and talent show coach; series 7, episode 5, "Talent Ahoy!"	
2025	Strictly Come Dancing	Contestant; series 23	
2025	Strictly Come Dancing: It Takes Two	Interviewee and training contributor during Strictly Come Dancing	
2025	Morning Live	Guest; later guest presenter alongside Helen Skelton	
2025	Loose Women	Guest	
2025	The Most Embarrassing TV Moments	Celebrity contributor and commentator	
2026	The Traitors: Uncloaked	Guest and Traitors superfan; series 4, episode 8	
2026	The One Show	Guest	
2026	The National Lottery's Big Night of Musicals	Performer as Miss Hannigan from Annie	
2026	Good Morning Britain	Guest; appearances on 25 March and 30 June	
2026	This Morning	Recurring showbiz and entertainment presenter	
2026	Eurovision Song Contest	United Kingdom jury spokesperson; 2026 contest	
2026	EastEnders	Herself; guest appearance during Walford Pride	
2026	The Hit List	Celebrity contestant; series 9	

== Theatre ==
Year	Title	Role	Venue	Ref.
2007	Cinderella	Ugly Sister	Sunderland Empire	
2010	Cinderella	Ugly Sister	Aylesbury Waterside Theatre	
2013	Cinderella	Sharon; Ugly Sister	Shaw Theatre, London	
2014	Aladdin	Widow Twankey; director	Shaw Theatre, London	
2016	La Voix: Diva Breakdown	Performer	Ambassadors Theatre, London; UK tour	
2016	Aladdin	Widow Twankey	Aylesbury Waterside Theatre	
2017	Snow White and the Seven Dwarfs	Nursie	Aylesbury Waterside Theatre	
2018	Peter Pan	Mrs Smee	Aylesbury Waterside Theatre	
2019	La Voix: Live, Loud & Fabulous	Performer	UK tour	
2019	Beauty and the Beast	Polly Pot et Pan	Aylesbury Waterside Theatre	
2021	Cinderella	Fairy Godmother	Aylesbury Waterside Theatre	
2022	La Voix: Eighth Wonder of the World	Performer	Lyric Theatre, London; UK tour	
2022	Aladdin	Widow Twankey	Aylesbury Waterside Theatre	
2023	La Voix: The Red Ambition Tour	Performer	UK tour; Lyric Theatre, London	
2023	Beauty and the Beast	Dame Peggy Pullem	Wycombe Swan	
2024	Aladdin	Lola Lankey	Wycombe Swan	
2025	La Voix: The Show Isn't Over	Performer	UK tour; Theatre Royal, Drury Lane, London; Brighton Dome	
2025	Jack and the Beanstalk	Dame Trott	Wycombe Swan	
2026	Annie	Miss Hannigan	UK tour: Wimbledon, Birmingham, Manchester, Woking, Plymouth and Canterbury	
2026	Peter Pan	Tinker Bell	Wycombe Swan	

== Discography ==
=== Albums ===
- Musically Distanced (with Brian Nash) (2020)
- La Voix's Christmas Cracker Album (2020)
- Hello La Voix (2024)

=== Compilation albums ===
- Diva Breakdown (2024)

=== Extended plays ===
- It's Raining Men (2024)
- The Show Isn't Over (2025)
- Hitchcock Blonde (2025)

=== Singles ===
==== As lead artist ====
- My Time (2024)
- The Show Isn't Over (2025)
- Dance That Man Away (2025)
- The Magic of Christmas (2025)
- Tomorrow (2026)

==== With London Gay Big Band ====
- New York, New York (2015)
- Don't Rain On My Parade (2015)
- All I Want For Christmas Is You (2015)

=== Other appearances ===
- Diamonds Are a Girl's Best Friend (with London Gay Big Band) – from Brave (2015)
