= Violeta Marcos =

Catholic Filipina Augustine nun (1937–2001)

Violeta Marcos AMP
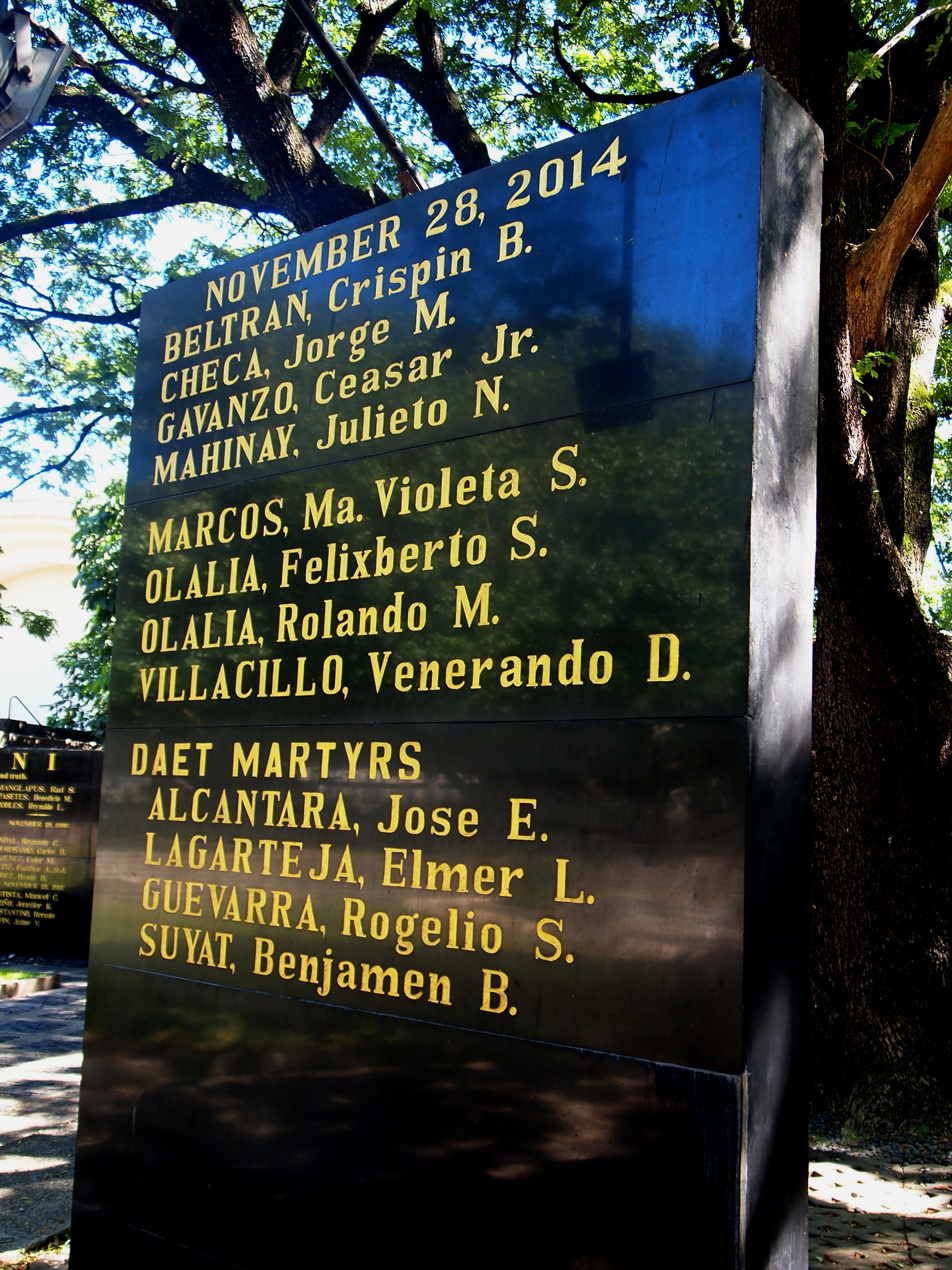
- Detail of the Wall of Remembrance at the Bantayog ng mga Bayani, showing names from the 2014 batch of Bantayog Honorees, including that of Violeta Marcos.

Personal life
- Born: Maria Remedios Sebastian Marcos; July 18, 1937 Pandi, Bulacan, Commonwealth of the Philippines
- Died: April 30, 2001 (aged 63) Manila, Philippines

Religious life
- Religion: Roman Catholic

Maria Violeta Marcos, AMP (born Maria Remedios Sebastian Marcos; July 18, 1937 – April 30, 2001) was a Filipino Roman Catholic nun. She was best known as the co-founder and first director of the Augustinian Missionaries of the Philippines, and for her contributions to the resistance in opposition to the martial Law dictatorship of Ferdinand Marcos - first through her diocesan social action involvements in Negros Occidental, and later as part of the human rights organization Task Force Detainees of the Philippines.

== Education and early career ==
Born Maria Remedios Marcos, Sr. Violeta originally studied Chemistry, and after graduating, took up a teaching position at La Consolacion College Manila before entering the convent. In 1966, she became the director of La Consolacion College.

== Assignment to Negros Island ==
In the early 1970s, Sr. Violeta accepted an assignment as administrator and principal of La Consolacion College in La Carlota City, Negros Occidental. With the island of Negros ridden by conflicts between poor workers and Marcos-associated landowners, this assignment led to what Sr. Violeta considered her awakening to the social issues of the time.

=== Martial law ===
When Ferdinand Marcos (no relation) announced in September 1972 that he was placing the Philippines under martial law, the social conflicts between workers and landowners on Negros Island became even worse, and Sr. Violeta became increasingly involved in human rights activism. In 1975, she left the academy to serve as full-time secretary of a group of religious and lay workers called the Justice for Sugar Workers Committee. She was also instrumental in the founding of the Negros Occidental Women Religious Association (NOWRA), and became part of the Task Force Detainees of the Philippines organized by the Association of Major Religious Superiors of the Philippines.

=== Work with Bishop Fortich ===
Sr. Violeta was instrumental in convincing Bishop Antonio Fortich of the Roman Catholic Diocese of Bacolod to become a voice for justice for the people of Negros, who were often victims of various human rights abuses of the Marcos dictatorship. She worked with a priest who had made an extensive collection of photographs of human rights abuses in Negros Island. They gave this collection to the bishop as documentation of the maltreatment of the people of Negros, persuading him that the congregation in Negros needed to take the side of poor people.

== Return to assignments in Manila ==
Sr. Violeta left Negros some time in the early 1980s, to take up new duties in Manila. She was serving in Manila when the Marcoses were finally deposed and forced into exile by the 1986 People Power Revolution.

== Founding of the Augustinian Missionaries of the Philippines ==
Sr. Violeta and a group of other sisters sought permission from the Vatican to form a new order in 1989. When the request was granted in 1999, she became the co-founder and first superior general of the Augustinian Missionaries of the Philippines.

== Death and legacy ==
Sr. Violeta died of breast cancer in Manila on April 30, 2001.

The Sr. Ma. Violeta Marcos Wholistic Healing Center of the Augustinian Missionaries of the Philippines in Infanta, Quezon is named after her. Her name is inscribed at the Bantayog ng mga Bayani as one of the heroes who fought for justice and democracy during the martial law era.
