= Constancio Bernardo =

Filipino painter

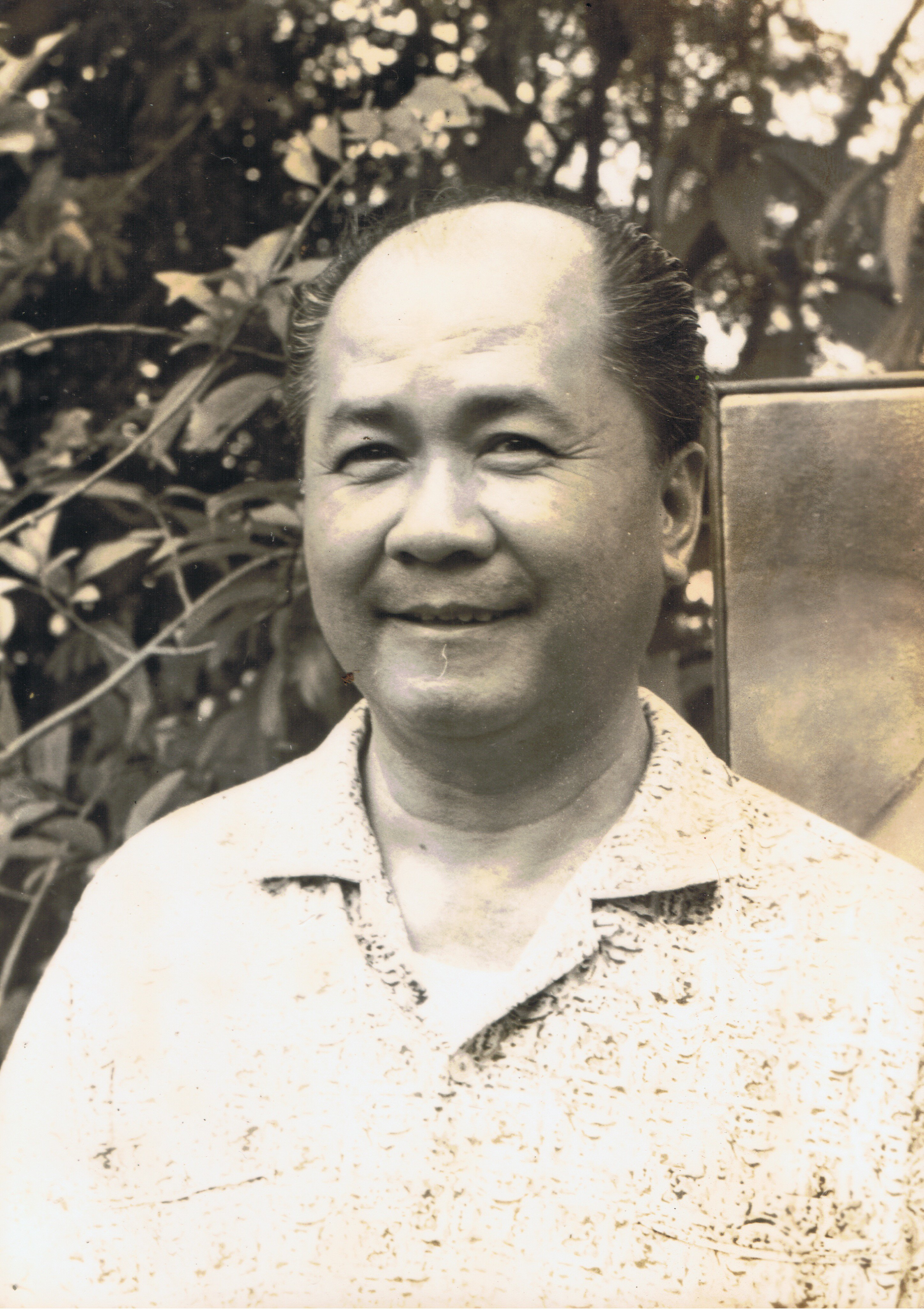
- Bernardo in 1969
- Born: Constancio Ma. Anastacio Bernardo; 22 December 1913; Obando, Bulacan, Philippine Islands
- Died: 8 August 2003 (aged 89)
- Education: University of the Philippines, Yale University
- Occupation: Painter
- Years active: 1933-2003
- Employer: College of Fine Arts, University of the Philippines
- Known for: Pioneer of modern Southeast Asian abstract painting
- Notable work: Perpetual Motion (1952)
- Style: Geometric Abstract
- Partner: Nieves de Guzman
- Website: www.constanciobernardo.com

Constancio Bernardo (22 December 1913 – 8 August 2003) was a Filipino painter and professor. He is known for making the earliest modern geometric abstract paintings in the Philippines and in Southeast Asia.

== Early life and education ==
Bernardo was born on 22 December 1913, in Obando, Bulacan, in American-occupied Philippines. He was the son of Pedro Ma. Bernardo and Cecilia Anastacio. He studied at Obando Elementary School from 1920 to 1925. In 1929, he transferred to Manila West, which is now Florentino Torres High School in Tondo, Manila, and finished his secondary education in 1933. He obtained a Bachelor of Fine Arts degree from the University of the Philippines in 1948. He was a student of Pablo and Fernando Amorsolo at the University of the Philippines School of Fine Arts before the Second World War. He earned a second Bachelor of Fine arts in 1951 and a Master of Fine Arts degree in 1952 at Yale School of Art as a Fulbright Scholar. While at Yale, he was mentored by Josef Albers who introduced him to innovative color experiments, teaching techniques and geometric abstract painting. He also took classes under Willem de Kooning and Edwin Savage.

== Work ==
Bernardo was the subject of three major retrospectives; the first one in 1979 at the Museum of Philippine Art, the second, in 2013 at the Ayala Museum during the centenary of his birth and the third, at the Cultural Center of the Philippines in 2014. According to art critic Alice Guillermo, Bernardo was "one of the earliest and most consistent exponents of abstract art in the Philippines". She wrote in the CCP Encyclopedia of Art that Bernardo worked in series, "combining geometrism and color research in such work groupings as the Bernardian series, the Rhapsody Square series, and the Wildflower series." Bernardo was a professor of Fine Arts at the UP College of Fine Arts from 1948 to 1978.
