= Marmalade (drag queen) =

Welsh drag performer

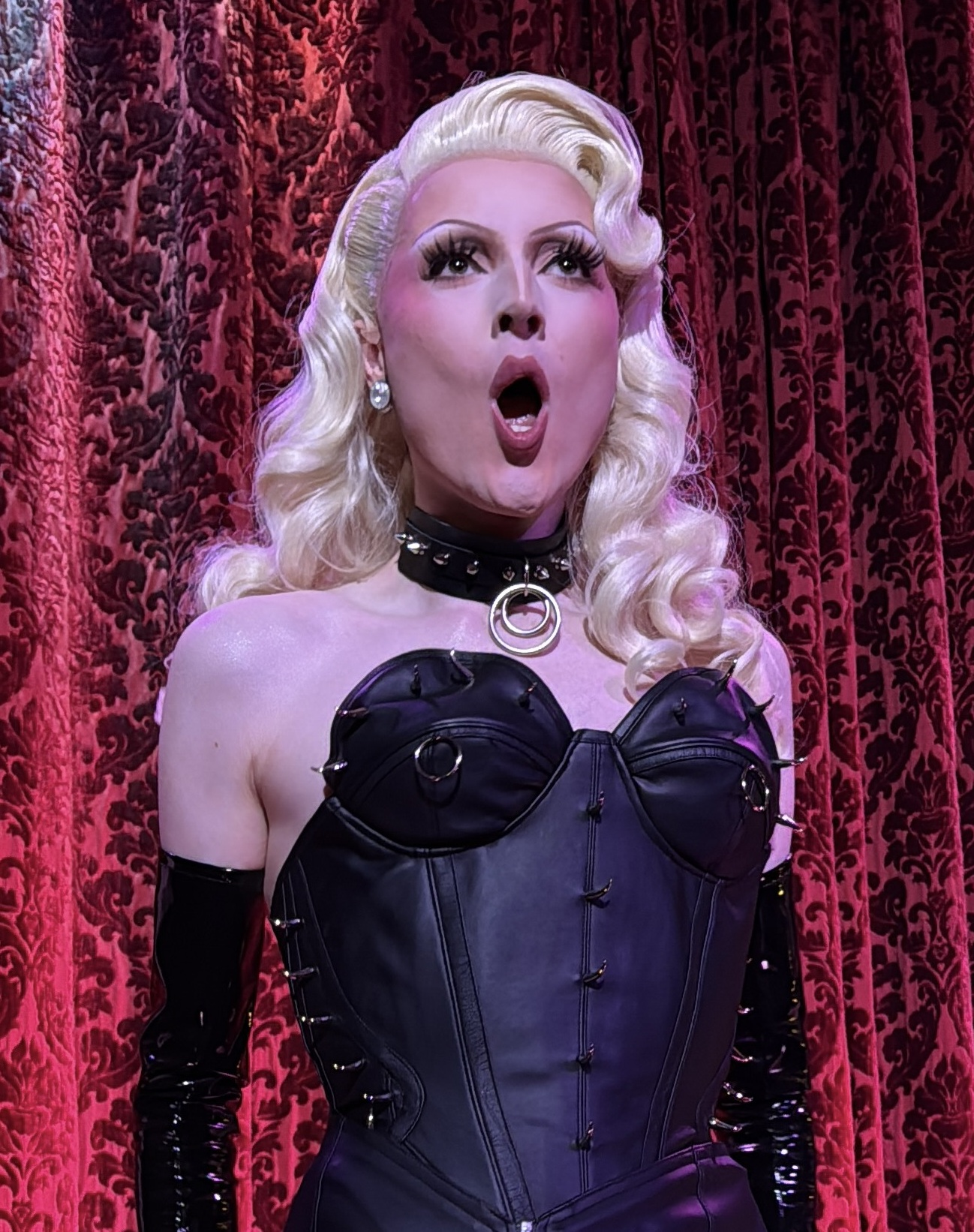
- Marmalade performing in 2025
- Born: Jack Bourton; 1999 or 2000 (age 26–27); Pontyclun, Rhondda Cynon Taf, Wales, U.K.
- Occupations: Drag performer; fashion designer
- Television: RuPaul's Drag Race UK

Marmalade is the stage name of Jack Bourton, a Welsh drag performer who competed on the sixth series of RuPaul's Drag Race UK. Marmalade is also the Guinness World Record holder for the most flowers placed on a dress.

== Early life ==
Bourton is originally from Pontyclun. He began experimenting with drag as a teenager.

== Career ==
Marmalade is a drag performer and fashion designer. She competed on the sixth series of RuPaul's Drag Race UK and had previously designed clothes for other drag entertainers, including series 3 contestant Victoria Scone. Marmalade showcased her Welsh background on the series' first episode. She won her first main challenge on the eighth episode. She wore an outfit inspired by a grammophone, as well as another cerulean dress with "Bob Mackie-esque" drapework and a headpiece. Marcus Wratten of PinkNews said Marmalade's "Semifinal Vinyl" look was the season's best. Marmalade placed third overall. After the show aired, The Queer Emporium asked her to create a variety show, resulting in Marm's Spotlight.

Marmalade earned a Guinness World Record for most flowers on a dress, with 1,862 daffodils. She debuted the dress at the National Botanic Garden of Wales to celebrate Saint David’s Day.

== Personal life ==
Bourton is based in Cardiff. Bourton uses the pronouns she/her in drag and he/him out of drag.

Tia Kofi and Victoria Scone have been described as Marmalade's "drag mother" and "drag grandmother", respectively. Marmalade's biological mother Deborah appeared in the eighth episode of Drag Race.

== See also ==
- List of drag queens
- List of people from Cardiff
