= Kyran Thrax =

English drag performer

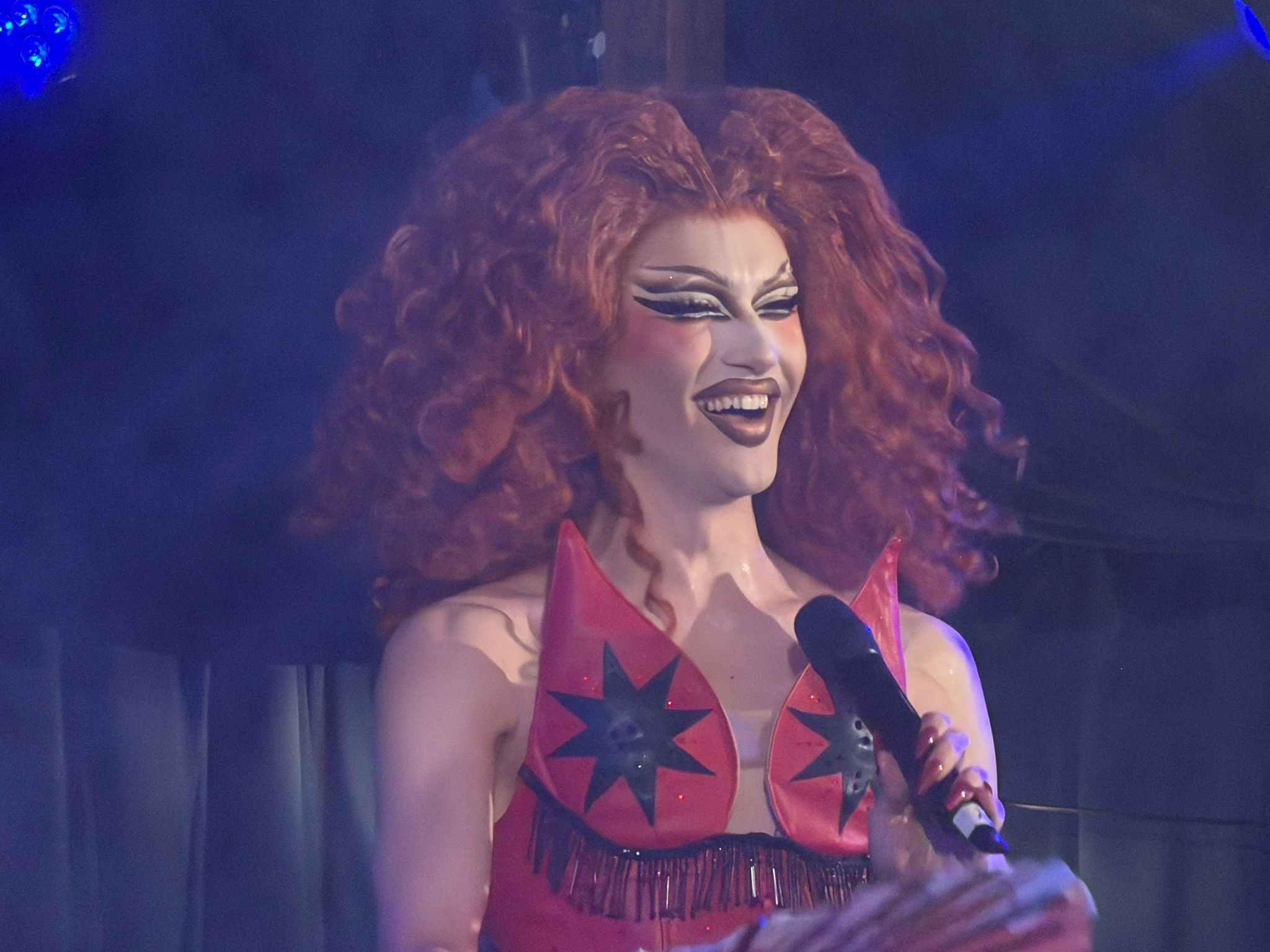
- Kyran Thrax in 2025
- Born: Kyran Peet
- Occupation: Drag performer
- Television: RuPaul's Drag Race UK (series 6)

Kyran Thrax is the stage name of Kyran Peet, an English drag performer and winner of sixth series of RuPaul's Drag Race UK.

== Early life ==
Peet discovered drag after playing around with makeup while attending drama school at East 15 Acting School.

Peet is a victim of child sexual exploitation. In 2012, at the age of 13, he was groomed by an older man who claimed to be 18–19 years old after befriending him on Facebook, leading to the pair meeting up and beginning a romantic and sexual relationship. In reality, the man was twenty-three years old. Peet testified at Preston Crown Court against the man when his real age was uncovered, resulting in his jailing. Peet suffered from psychological trauma as a result of the events that occurred, which in turn stunted his psychosocial development. Peet was awarded the High Sheriff of Lancashire’s Young Citizen of the Year Award in 2014. In 2017, at the age of 19, Peet raised £2,200 for The Children's Society by taking part in a twelve-person, week-long expedition in Brazil, summiting peaks such as Sugarloaf Mountain.

== Career ==
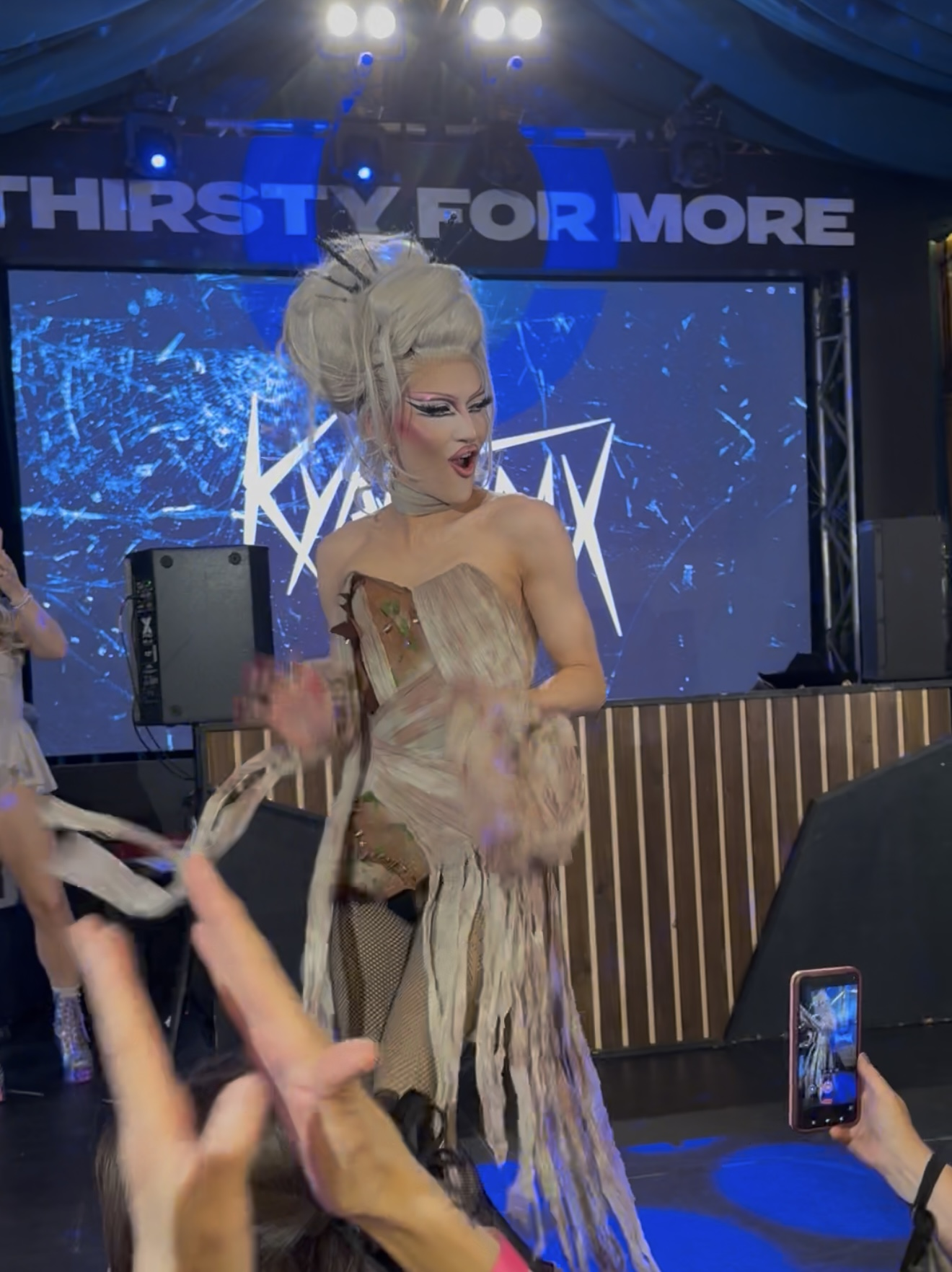
Kyran Thrax, 2025

In 2024, drag performer Kyran Thrax won the sixth series of RuPaul's Drag Race UK. On the first episode, the main challenge of which tasked contestants with performing at the Tickety Boo Cabaret, Kyran Thrax showcased puppetry and was declared a winner. She also won the acting challenge and the Snatch Game alongside eventual runner up La Voix.

Outside of Drag Race, Kyran Thrax has performed as part of the drag group Gals Aloud. In 2023, Kyran Thrax appeared in the film Dogman.

== Personal life ==
Peet is based in Chorley, Lancashire. Peet uses the pronouns she/her in drag and he/him and they/them out of drag.

Kyran Thrax is the "drag daughter" of Drag Race UK contestant Charity Kase. Kyran Thrax has said Lady Gaga influenced their drag.

== Discography ==
=== Singles ===
- The Maître D’ (2024)

== Filmography ==
- Dogman (as Drag Madonna, 2023)
- RuPaul's Drag Race UK (series 6, 2024)
- Hello Hello Hello, Road to RuPaul's Drag Race Season 17 (host, 2025), World of Wonder

== Theatre ==
Year	Title	Role	Theatre
2025	Adult Panto: The Wizard of Oz (UK)	Tin queen	Various venues
2025	All Drag Panto: Snow White (UK)	The Wicked Queen	Tuckshop Uk

== See also ==
- List of drag queens

Awards and achievements
Preceded by Ginger Johnson	Winner of RuPaul's Drag Race UK; Series 6 (2024)	Succeeded by Bones
