= Cruz 101 =

Nightclub and music venue in Manchester, England

Coordinates: 53°28′37″N 2°14′21″W

Cruz 101 (better known simply as Cruz) is a nightclub and music venue situated in Manchester's Gay Village near Canal Street, England. It is one of the most popular and longest-running gay clubs in Greater Manchester, often boasting itself as "Manchester's No.1 LGBTQ+ Nightclub and entertainment venue".

== Creation ==
Before it was turned into a night club, the building now homed by Cruz 101 was a shipping warehouse, which contributed to Manchester's huge textiles industry, making the area the world's largest marketplace for cotton goods. After some time being derelict, a year long renovation process began, after which point the club was ready to open its doors for the first time on 22 May 1992. Cruz shares the building with offices which occupy the floors above and a smaller club to the rear called Satans Hollow.

== History ==
When Cruz first opened, the licensing laws at the time insisted that membership was compulsory and customers had to wait up to 48 hours for membership to be cleared. Encouraged by increased pressure from customers, the club owners fought a lengthy legal battle at the high court which eventually enabled Cruz to allow membership on the door. Whilst initially this legality only entitled Cruz 101 to allow membership on the door, it ultimately set a precedent which allowed other night clubs in the United Kingdom to follow the same rules. The new flexible membership options available at Cruz proved to be both a benefit and somewhat of a hindrance to the club owners and its regular clientele. Though previously the club had found itself restricted by license conditions, the strict membership policy gave customers confidence that the club was one of the few truly safe gay venues in the area. During the 1990s, the club was owned by Foo Foo Lammar.

In 1999 the exterior lighting and signage of the club was changed from "Cruz 101" to Babylon as a backdrop for scenes of the UK series of Queer As Folk. Following the completion of filming, the original name and signage was returned.

In 2002, Cruz won the right to admit non-members, giving it the opportunity to raise revenue by admitting almost anyone. The club, however, has a door policy which remains predominantly for the LGBTQ+ community. Cruz still operates a membership scheme which allows for a slightly reduced entrance fee and is available for all users of the Cruz 101 App. The App was first introduced in 2018

The longest-running weekly event at Cruz was Disco Inferno on a Monday night, which started in 1993 and run until the early 00s. Originally featuring disco from the 1970s and 80s, the sets later expanded to include the 90s. At the time, the main resident DJ at Cruz was Almighty Donald, who took his name from the namesake Almighty Records - he often played tracks produced by the company. Donald returns to the club to play on special occasions, such as Cruz 101's annual Babylon weekend in February.

Cruz 101 has had many notable singers, performers and PAs over the years, including Kerry Ellis, Sonia, The Weather Girls, Phil Oakey, Heaven 17, Hazell Dean, Margarita Pracatan, Take That and The Nolans, Kelly Llorenna, Angie Brown, Scooch, Steps, Ella Henderson, Kelli-Leigh, Pixie Lott, Nadine Coyle, Viola Wills, Katrina of the Waves, Rozalla, Max George, Harlee, Booty Luv, Lisa Scott Lee and Urban Cookie Collective.

Some of the UK's biggest drag acts have also performed on the infamous Cruz main stage, including many stars from RuPaul's Drag Race UK; Danny Beard, Tia Kofi, Tomara Thomas, Michael Marouli, Cara Melle, Banksie, Baga Chipz, Choriza May, Actavia, Chanel O'Conor, DeDeLicious, Charra Tea, Zahirah Zapanta and Cheddar Gorgeous among them. The latter previously worked at Cruz alongside Anna Phylactic as a regular host of AS (AfterShock, now named AllSorts) - The Saturday night House party in Sub 101 that launched by promoter/DJ Nik Denton in 2011.

Cruz has received patronage from celebrities such as Lily Savage, Graham Norton, Cilla Black, Steps, Russell T Davis and many cast members from Coronation Street.

== Present ==
Today the club remains extremely popular among older and younger party-goers and in 2025 has a far more relaxed door policy than in previous years, reflecting changes in society. It has evolved from opening just two nights a week to the present six nights a week. Now it only closes on a Monday.

Cruz has worked in partnership with other bars, events and clubs in and around Manchester's Gay Village, creating events and raising funds for LGBTQ+ charities, such as George House Trust and LGBTQ Foundation.

Cruz has two floors, with the 'main floor' (on which the entrance to the club is located) being the busiest. This is where Cruz concentrates its efforts, with PAs taking place on this floor as well as themed events all year long. Highlights include Manchester Pride, Babylon, Bank Holiday weekends, Christmas, New Year and Halloween. One of their most popular Saturday night parties is Queen Supreme, a customer favourite that always features some of the best drag artists from across the UK and beyond. Queen Supreme is now once a month. Current regular hosts include Destiny Dyson, Vin Dicktiv and Xa'Scarlett Baby.

Alternatively, Cruz features a slightly smaller downstairs known as 'Sub 101', which is accessible from the main club; however on some occasions Cruz charges an entrance fee from an alternative outside entrance on special promoted nights. Sub is predominantly reserved for more underground music on a Saturday night, such as House music and Tech House. It has just one alcohol-serving bar as opposed to the main floor which has two. Sub 101 is open every Saturday and is home to AllSorts/Aftershock, which is now the clubs longest running night. The space is also now host to the club's main parties on Tuesdays, Wednesdays and Sundays, where the music policy is pop, chart and commercial dance.

The main music policy for Cruz 101's main events is pop, pop remixes and commercial dance.

Cruz is owned by three people equally, one of whom previously owned Napoleon's, a bar/club that was also located in the gay village. The general manager of Cruz is currently Gerrard Woods and the assistant manager is John Cooper (the role previously held by Paul Tuck). Cooper is also known to regular customers as drag queen Miss Cara, who remains to date as one of the club's most iconic hosts. Miss Cara makes special appearances at the club's bigger parties, including NYE, Babylon and at each Birthday event in May every year.

Nik Denton is the club's promotions and entertainment manager (since 2022). Prior to taking this position, Nik worked at the club as the promoter and DJ for AllSorts/Aftershock in Sub 101 since 2011.

== Incidents ==
During Gay Pride 2008, one phase of the power failed in the club leaving limited disco lighting in operation and no music playing for about 20 minutes. Staff at the club managed to bring most of the power back on-line, however several sets of disco lights and bar lights were non-functional on one of the clubs busiest nights of the year. The power failure was caused by a failure of the main supply to the building.

On New Year's Eve 2008, a small fire broke out on stage shortly after midnight which was caused by a mis-firing show pyrotechnic. Staff evacuated the club and police attended. No injuries were reported and around 20 minutes later the large group of party-goers which waited outside the main entrance were allowed back in. The club remained open well into the early hours with the capacity crowd partying until well after 7am.

Cruz 101 received some controversy in 2021 from LGBTQ+ customers due to the Conservative party hosting an after-party in the club

== DJs ==
Cruz has many resident DJs on rotation and has regular guest DJs appearing at the club.

Current roster (correct March 2025)

- James Bowers (Saturdays) Pop, Commercial Dance
- Luke Lucent (Saturdays) Pop, Commercial Dance
- Stephen Nicholls (Saturdays, Wednesdays) Pop, Commercial Dance - Also DJs for Allsorts in Sub 101
- Chris Blackmore (Saturdays) Pop, Commercial Dance
- Kriss Herbert (Saturdays) Pop, Commercial Dance
- Craig Law (Saturdays) Pop, Commercial Dance
- Dan Walker (Thursdays) Pop, Commercial Dance
- DJ ITK (Fridays) Pop, Commercial Dance
- Nik Denton (Saturdays, Sundays) Pop, Commercial Dance - Also DJs for Allsorts in Sub 101
- Bad Influence (Tuesdays) Pop, Commercial Dance
- Sam Londt (Monthly Saturdays) Pop, Commercial Dance
- Callum Parr (Regular Saturday appearances) Pop, Commercial Dance
- Ben Hughes (AllSorts in Sub 101) House Music, Tech House
- Jim Dusty (AllSorts in Sub 101) House Music, Tech House
- Shaun Wild (AllSorts in Sub 101) House Music, Tech House
- Mark Armitage (AllSorts in Sub 101) House Music, Tech House
- Almighty Donald - Hi-NRG, Commercial Dance (Now only special appearances since quitting full time)

Previous residents

- Rob James - Trance in 'Sub' and Commercial Dance on the main floor.
- DJ Spook - Hi-NRG, Commercial Dance.
- Flash Tony - Commercial Dance and Bouncy house.
- Darren Leasley - Commercial Dance.
- Little Miss Natalie - Trance and Bouncy house in 'Sub'.
- Dino - Hi-NRG, Inferno (70s, 80s, 90s)

== See also ==
- Canal Street (Manchester)
- Queer As Folk
- Almighty Records
- List of LGBTQ bars
