= Banksie =

British drag performer

- Born: Jonathan Banks; Wigan, England, United Kingdom
- Occupation: Drag queen
- Television: RuPaul's Drag Race UK (series 5)

Banksie is the stage name of Jonathan Banks, a British drag performer and a contestant on series 5 of RuPaul's Drag Race UK.

== Early life and education ==
Banks was born in Wigan and studied at the Manchester School of Art (Manchester Metropolitan University). Banks began performing in drag after watching early seasons of RuPaul's Drag Race.

== Career ==
Banks is a drag performer who began developing the persona Banksie at the age of fifteen. BBC has said, "This particular seven-foot supermodel is obsessed with all things burlesque, and loves to channel the 'dark, horrible women' of the 1930s and 1940s with a modern twist." Banksie has said, "My inspirations originate from fashion in the early 90s to the 2000s. I love Thierry Mugler, Vivienne Westwood, Jean Paul Gaultier and Paul Galliano. I love researching fashion and then finding a way to make it work on my body." She is artistic director for the venue Firehouse on Swan Street.

Banksie competed on series 5 of RuPaul's Drag Race UK. She was eliminated from the competition after placing in the bottom two of the Rusical challenge and losing a lip sync against DeDeLicious to "I Dreamed a Dream" by Susan Boyle.

== Personal life ==
Banks lived in Manchester, before locating to Melbourne in 2026. Their surname inspired the name Banksie.

Banks is non-binary and 6'8", but approximately seven feet tall in heels, making them one of the tallest contestants on Drag Race.

Banksie is part of the "drag family" of Cheddar Gorgeous.

== Discography ==
=== As lead artist ===
Title	Year	Album
"Get Fruity!" (with Monopoly Phonic)	2024	non-album single

=== Featured singles ===
Title	Year	Album
"Don't Ick My Yum (The M-52s Version)" (RuPaul featuring Kate Butch, Ginger Johnson, & Miss Naomi Carter)	2023	non-album single
"Pant-Oh She Better Don't: The Rusical"	2023	Pant-Oh She Better Don't: The Rusical Album

== Filmography ==
=== Television ===
Year	Title	Role	Notes	Ref
2023	RuPaul's Drag Race UK	Herself	Contestant	
2023	The After Shave with Danny Beard	Herself	Guest	

- Bring Back My Girls

== See also ==
- List of people from Manchester
