= Michael Marouli =

British drag performer

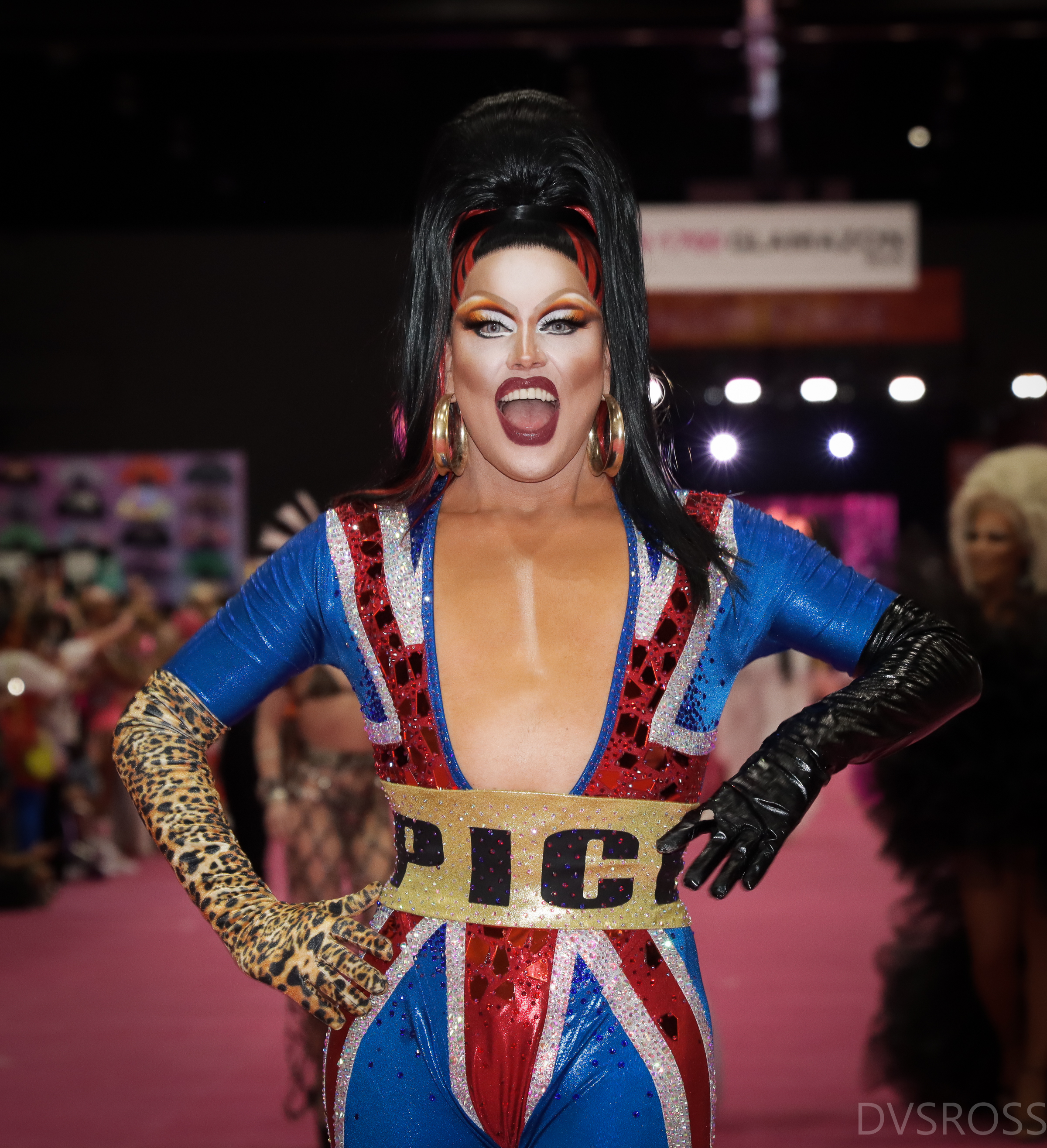
- Marouli at RuPaul's DragCon LA, 2024
- Born: Michael Clyde Marouli; Whitley Bay, Tyne and Wear, England
- Occupation: Drag queen
- Television: RuPaul's Drag Race UK (series 5); Drag Race Down Under vs. the World
- Website: michaelmarouli.co.uk

Michael Clyde Marouli is a British drag performer who competed on series 5 of RuPaul's Drag Race UK and won the 2026 spin-off series Drag Race Down Under vs. the World.

== Career ==
Michael Marouli has been a drag performer for approximately 15 years. She began doing drag at the age of 22 and has described her persona as "camp, daft, filth, fabulous, and iconic". Marouli is also a cabaret performer in Gran Canaria, and a winner of Drag Idol Newcastle. She has appeared on The X Factor, and competed on series 5 (2023) of RuPaul's Drag Race UK. For the girl group challenge on Drag Race, she was part of Fierce Force Five with Cara Melle, DeDeLicious, Tomara Thomas, and Vicki Vivacious. Michael Marouli impersonated Catherine Tate for the Snatch Game challenge. She was the runner-up to Ginger Johnson.

Michael Marouli performed at Lincoln Pride in 2024.

== Personal life ==
Michael Marouli is from Newcastle upon Tyne, and uses the pronouns she/her in drag and he/him out of drag.

== Discography ==
=== Singles ===
Title	Year	Album
"Freedom (LGBTQ)" [feat. Gio Box]	2017	non-album single

=== Featured singles ===
Title	Year	Album
"Don't Ick My Yum (Fierce Force Five Version)" (RuPaul featuring Tomara Thomas, Vicki Vivacious, Cara Melle, & DeDeLicious)	2023	non-album single
"Pant-Oh She Better Don't: The Rusical"	2023	Pant-Oh She Better Don't: The Rusical Album

== Filmography ==
=== Television ===
Year	Title	Role	Notes	Ref
2014	The X Factor UK	Self	Arena Auditions Wk 2	
2023	RuPaul's Drag Race UK	Self	Contestant	
2023	Lorraine	Self	Guest	
2024	Bring Back My Girls	Self	Guest	
2024	The Road Trip	Britta Broad	1 episode	
2025	Dear Viv	Self		
2026	Drag Race Down Under vs. the World	Self	Contestant (winner)	
