= The Wicked Wiz of Oz: The Rusical! =

- RuPaul's Drag Race episode
- Episode no.: Season 17; Episode 8
- Presented by: RuPaul
- Original air date: February 21, 2025

Guest appearances
- Jamal Sims; Adam Lambert

Episode chronology
← Previous "Snatch Game"	Next → "Heavens to Betsey!"
- RuPaul's Drag Race season 17

"The Wicked Wiz of Oz: The Rusical!" is the eighth episode of the seventeenth season of the American television series RuPaul's Drag Race. It originally aired on MTV on February 21, 2025, and features a Rusical (musical theatre challenge) inspired by Wicked, The Wizard of Oz, The Wiz, and A Chorus Line. The judging panel includes RuPaul, Michelle Visage, choreographer Jamal Sims, and American singer Adam Lambert.

Sam Star is the winner of the main challenge. Acacia Forgot is eliminated from the competition after placing in the bottom two and losing a lip-sync contest against Kori King to "Wet Dreams" by Lambert. The episode was nominated in the Outstanding Lighting Design / Lighting Direction for a Variety Series category at the 77th Primetime Emmy Awards

== Episode ==
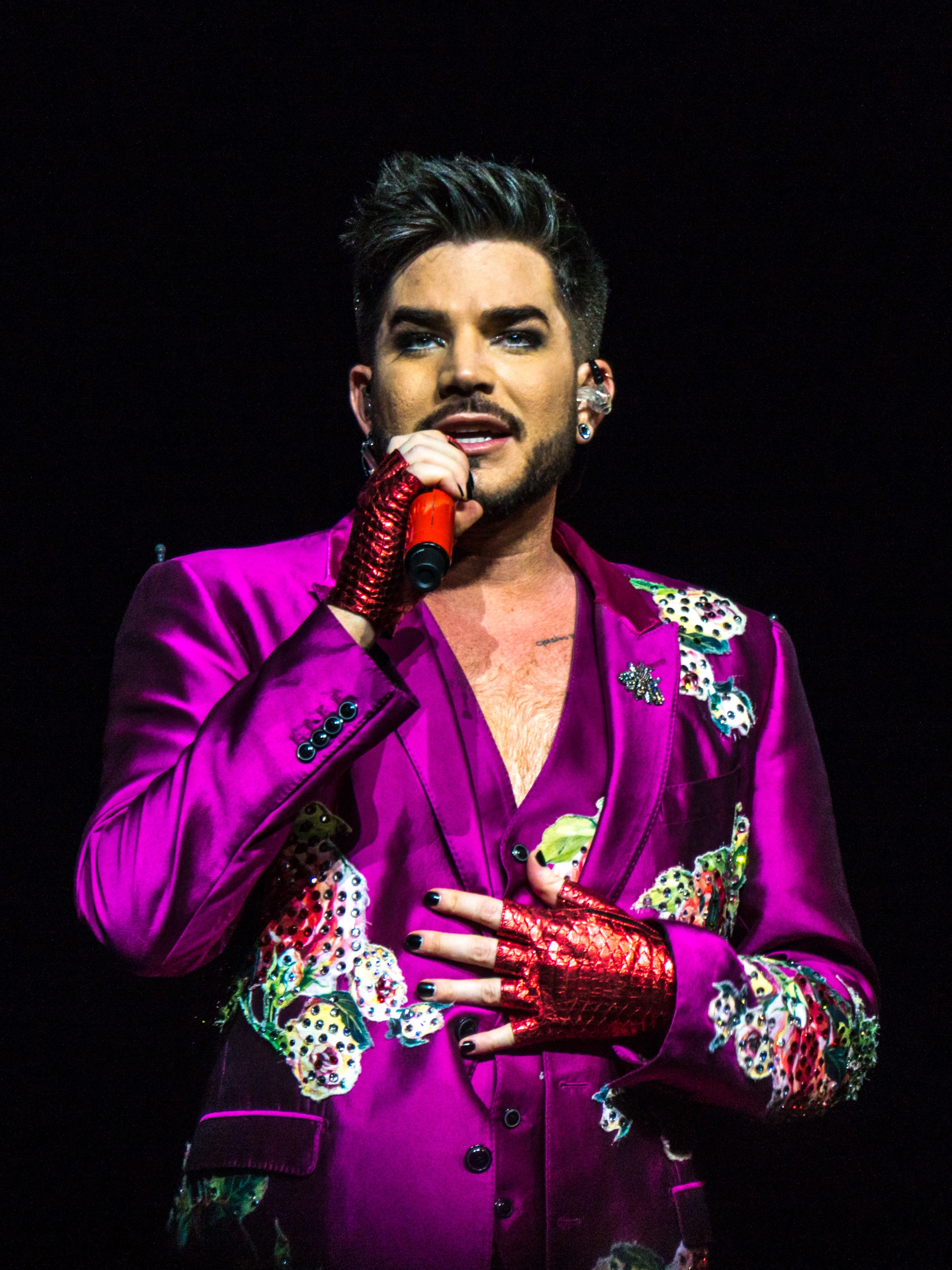
Adam Lambert (pictured in 2017) is a guest judge.

The contestants return to the Werk Room after the elimination of Crystal Envy on the previous episode. On a new day, RuPaul greets the group and reveals the main challenge, which tasks contestants with performing in a Rusical (musical theatre production) inspired by Wicked, The Wizard of Oz, and The Wiz. The contestants select the following roles:

- Acacia Forgot as Kansas Dorothy
- Arrietty as Scarecrow
- Jewels Sparkles as Good Witch
- Kori King as a flying monkey
- Lana Ja'Rae as Tinwoman
- Lexi Love as Lioness
- Lydia B Kollins as a flying monkey
- Onya Nurve as Harlem Dorothy
- Sam Star as a Cher-inspired Wicked Witch
- Suzie Toot as Green Witch

On the main stage, the contestants record vocals with Michelle Visage and a music producer, then rehearse choreography with Jamal Sims. Back in the Werk Room, the contestants prepare for the fashion show. Sam Star shares about their experience playing sports at a young age, as well as the role of Ursula from The Little Mermaid in a high school play. Arrietty and Kori King share about their struggles with weight. Arrietty also describes her struggles with anorexia and bulimia. Acacia Forgot describes her experience with cystic fibrosis. The contestants discuss the relationship between Kori King and Lydia B Kollins.

Back on the main stage, RuPaul welcomes fellow panelists Visage and Sims, as well as guest judge Adam Lambert. The contestants perform the Rusical, then present their runway looks. The category is "Parasols: Shady Ladies". The judges deliver their critiques to the top and bottom contestants, then deliberate while the contestants are back stage. Sam Star is declared the winner of the main challenge. Acacia Forgot and Kori King place in the bottom two and face off in a lip-sync contest to Lambert's song "Wet Dreams". Kori King wins the contest and Acacia Forgot is eliminated from the competition. Acacia Forgot returns to the Werk Room and leaves a message for the remaining contestants.

== Production ==
The episode originally aired on the American television network MTV on February 21, 2025.

Acacia Forgot's main stage exit line is "You can now find my new single on all streaming platforms." Her lipstick mirror message is "All you can do is Forgot. Love, the Piggie of the Week. — Acacia <3".

=== Fashion ===
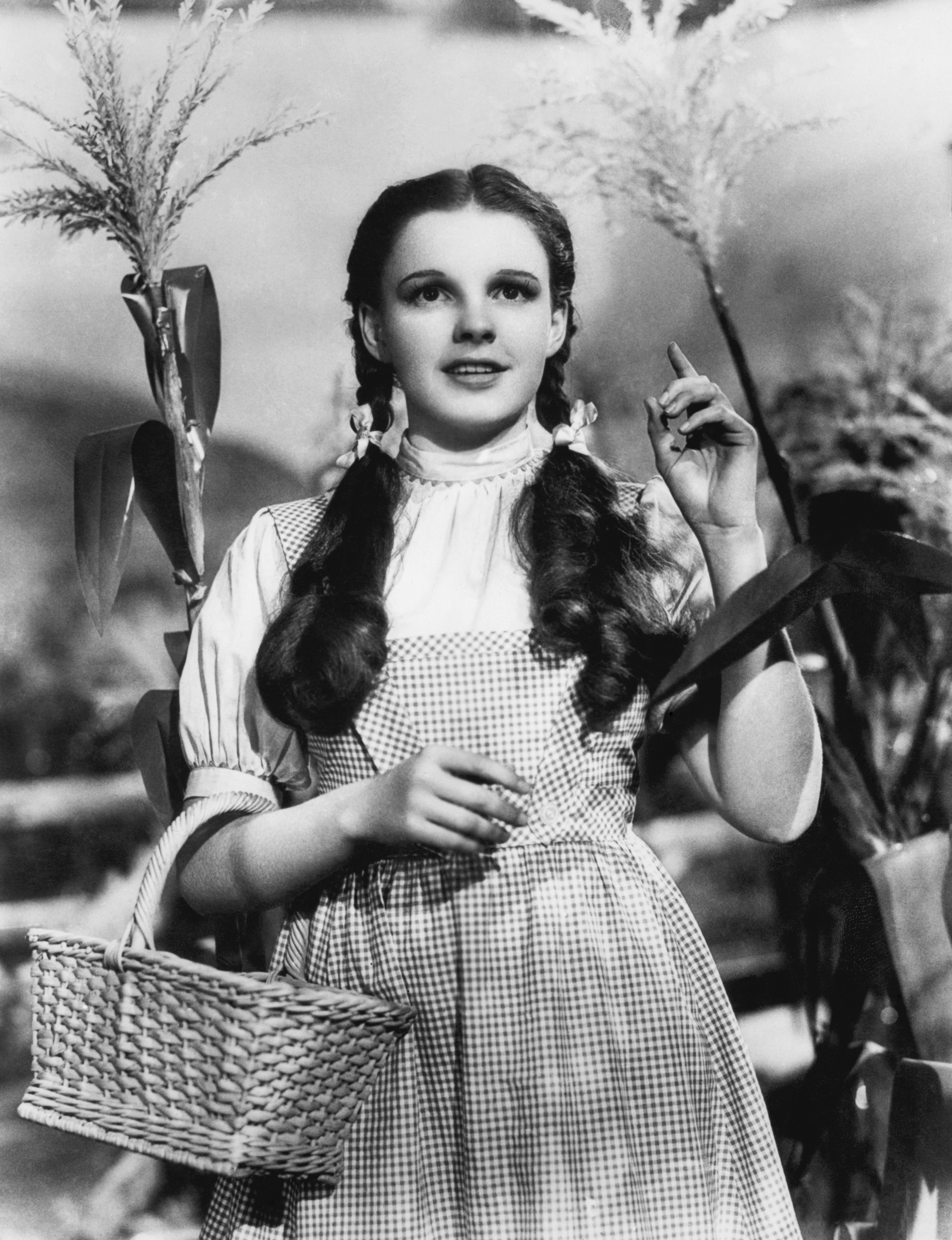
For the runway, Kori King wears an outfit inspired by Dorothy (pictured is Judy Garland as Dorothy in the 1939 film The Wizard of Oz).

For the runway show, Suzie Toot has a monochromatic Art Deco-inspired leotard and a Japanese-inspired paper parasol. Jewels Sparkles wears a black dress and carries a black umbrella with a beaded trim. Arrietty's red-colored gown has ruffles and showcases her Latin heritage. Lexi Love has a black-and-gold outfit and wears a parasol as a hat. Sam Star showcases a Southern belle-inspired outfit.

Lydia B Kollins has a flying nun-inspired floral outfit. Kori King's outfit is inspired by the gingham dress of Judy Garland as Dorothy in The Wizard of Oz. Kori King carries a stuffed dog in a basket (referencing Toto). Onya Nurve presents a yellow outfit made of chiffon. Acacia Forgot has a Dior-inspired dress and tall hair made with two parasols and wigs. Lana Ja'Rae wears a vampire-inspired black gown and a wig previously worn in the show by (her "drag sister") Luxx Noir London.

== Reception ==
Jason P. Frank of Vulture rated the episode three out of five stars. The episode earned lighting designer Gus Dominguez, moving light programmer Thomas Schneider, media server programmer Darren Barrows, and gaffer Steve Moreno a nomination in the Outstanding Lighting Design / Lighting Direction for a Variety Series category at the 77th Primetime Emmy Awards (2025).

== See also ==
- Adaptations of The Wonderful Wizard of Oz
- Judy Garland as a gay icon
