= Slay (2024 film) =

2024 horror comedy film

- Promotional release poster
- Directed by: Jem Garrard
- Written by: Jem Garrard
- Produced by: Adam Friedlander; Tebogo Maila
- Starring: Trinity the Tuck; Heidi N Closet; Crystal Methyd; Cara Melle
- Cinematography: Trevor Calverley
- Edited by: David Travail
- Music by: Andries Smit
- Production company: Blue Ice Pictures
- Distributed by: Tubi
- Release date: March 22, 2024
- Running time: 99 minutes
- Country: Canada
- Language: English

Slay is a 2024 Canadian horror comedy film written and directed by Jem Garrard. The film features RuPaul's Drag Race stars Trinity the Tuck, Heidi N Closet and Crystal Methyd, and Cara Melle from RuPaul's Drag Race UK. The film is about four drag queens who become stuck inside a redneck biker bar and must team up with the conservative patrons to fight off a growing number of vampires.

== Plot ==
On a back road in flyover country, redneck Rufus is attacked and killed by an ugly vampire while en route to deliver food to a nearby biker bar, The Bold Buck. The vampire then runs back onto the road, where it is almost run over by a mobile home RV. Inside are four drag queens on a tour across America: headstrong leader Mama Sue Flay, manager and romantic Robin Banks, stubborn choreographer Olive Wood, and the ditzy Bella Da Boys. Mama and Olive clash over the set list for their upcoming gig, with Mama repeatedly putting her foot down on any changes Olive suggests. Robin encourages them to stop fighting, as she believes they are headed towards a legendary gay bar that will net them a significant performance fee.

Upon arrival they realize that Robin mistook The Bold Buck for The Bold Tuck, and the quartet are not impressed by the venue's run-down look or its close-minded and homophobic clientele. The bar's manager Dusty acts surprised at the queens' presence and denies booking them, but asks them to perform anyway as there's no other entertainment booked for the night and he can still pay them. The queens debate whether they should still leave for their own safety, with Olive especially disdainful of the venue, but ultimately choose to stay after two queer patrons—Jax and Steven—arrive and proclaim their excitement at finally being able to see a drag show in their small town.

The queens prepare for the show, with Mama again shutting down Olive's suggestions but trying to assuage her attitude by loaning her a sentimental hairpin. Robin befriends another patron, Sheila, as well as stage manager Earl as they arrange lighting cues. Meanwhile, Rufus reanimates and makes his way on foot to The Bold Buck, killing several bikers who left in disgust at the prospect of the drag show. Inside, the queens take stage with a lip sync of "WAP", winning over some patrons, including Sheila, but earning the ire of Travis and his friend Fatboy. While Travis and Mama are heckling each other, Rufus storms in and bites Fatboy on the neck before being thrown out. Though the queens attempt to resume their show, Fatboy soon turns into a vampire himself, causing chaos until he's knocked out and stuffed inside a freezer.

The queens, Dusty, Sheila, Earl, Jax, and Steven realize they're safer inside the bar while many other patrons flee. Travis attempts to lead his other biker friends in a shootout against the vampires, but runs back inside after a majority of them are slain off screen. The survivors determine that they only need to survive until dawn, and in the meantime can defend themselves against the undead by impaling them through the hearts or exposing them to garlic. However, Dusty notes that the vampires could break in at any time because the signage outside has allowed them constant invitation. Furthermore, the vampires have begun slashing the tires of all surrounding vehicles and are turning anyone else who arrives outside.

As the survivors attempt to board up all the entrances to the bar, Olive tries to convince Mama to use the other patrons as a distraction while the queens escape. Mama tells her they are safer together and sends her to watch over Bella and Jax, who are bonding as the former gives the latter a makeover. Olive gets fed up and flees to their RV, where she is safe from the vampires due to it being enough of a home to require an invitation inside. However, her escape left a window open at the bar and another vampire sneaks inside, chasing Jax and Bella.

Elsewhere, Robin and Steven flirt with each other, but are repeatedly interrupted by the vampires. In the bar's basement bowling alley, Mama saves Travis from a vampire ambush, earning Travis' begrudging respect. Jax manages to kill the vampire chasing them, but Bella's attempt to hide in the air vents gets her attacked by another vampire, who fatally stabs her in their fight before being put down by Travis. Olive returns to the bar just as the others are mourning Bella, leading to her and Mama blaming each other for the situation they're in. Olive calls out the other queer people present, saying that they have no hope of survival between the vampires and the bigoted patrons. Despite the others telling her that she needs to have hope, she decides she's better off on her own and sneaks away on a stolen bicycle while the vampires outside are distracted and eating frat boys.

While commiserating, Dusty reveals that he booked the queens after all, which Mama had already figured out. He then comes out to her, saying he wanted to be a drag queen himself as a child, but was beaten by his father and has remained closeted until now. Fatboy breaks out of the freezer and attempts to kill the queens, but is caught off guard when Bella reanimates and kills him by stabbing him with her stiletto heel. Though the survivors are worried that Bella will now kill them, she states that she's able to control her cravings for blood simply because she doesn't want to hurt anyone. Earl and Sheila reveal that they were also turned without anyone noticing, but similarly have no ill-will towards the others. Jax is initially relieved, stating that the vampires they've been fighting are only bloodthirsty because they were like that in life, so if any of the survivors are turned they'll simply become nice vampires. However, Rufus has heard everything that happened inside, and Bella can hear him telling his vampire army to kill everyone instead of turning them. Meanwhile, Olive has gotten as far as Rusty's truck and is attacked by the ugly vampire. She successfully kills it with Mama's hairpin, after which she notices that Rusty's truck has a crate full of garlic.

As the survivors prepare for their final battle, Robin convinces Mama to give Dusty a drag makeover since he may never get another chance. Though initially surprised, the other patrons are impressed and accepting of Dusty's new look and become motivated to fight to the end. At first they seem evenly matched thanks to their own vampire allies, but Earl is permanently killed in a skirmish. Sheila is also impaled, but survives thanks to the stake getting stuck on her breast implant before it could reach her heart. Robin and Steven share a kiss before Rufus and his followers corner everyone, preparing to kill them all. However, Olive arrives and sets off the water sprinkler, revealing that she'd filled the bar's water tank with the garlic. As the other vampires writhe in pain, the survivors are able to kill them for good.

With the threat defeated, Travis admits that the queens seem to be decent people, but he has no desire to stick around further and storms off into the dawn. Bella and Sheila realize that sunlight isn't fatal to them, much to everyone's relief. Olive and Mama reconcile, with Olive apologizing for not following orders, and Mama apologizing for not respecting her ideas. As the queens prepare to leave for their next venue, Robin promises to visit Steven on the way back. Dusty recruits Steven and Jax to help him repair The Bold Buck, declaring his intent to convert it into the fabulous gay bar of his dreams. Happy that they've managed to do some good in spite of the night's horror, the queens promise that they'll return if he ever needs help with entertainment, or with other people's prejudice.

== Cast ==
- Trinity the Tuck as Mama Sue Flay
- Heidi N Closet as Robin Banks
- Crystal Methyd as Bella Da Boys
- Cara Melle as Olive Wood
- Neil Sandilands as Dusty
- Donia Kash as Jax
- Gabriel Harry Meltz as Steven
- Daniel Janks as Travis
- Robyn Scott as Sheila
- Shane John Kruger as Rufus
- Joe Vas as Fatboy
- Richard Wright-Firth as Clive
- Gustav Rossouw as Marv
- Bester Wian as Chuck

== Release ==
The film was released on Tubi on March 22, 2024.

== Reception ==
Vicky Lawrence of Starburst gave the film a rating of 4 over 5 and wrote: "it's a perfectly fun and camp film; silly, action-packed, and a nice easy watch that packs in important themes with ease".

Movie Meister Review gave the film a positive review and wrote: "Tubi could honestly take notes and make a whole bunch more like this, silly camp films that go well at a weekend watch party with some friends. It's not here to change lives or be considered high art, Slay is here to entertain and goddamn it does it get that job done".

Jim Morazzini of Voice from the Balcony also gave the film a positive feedback, writing: "I will say that although the leads are great performers, they're not professional actors, and while they do a good job given that, there are the occasional rough spots along the way. But that's really the only complaint I have. Overall, Slay is a highly enjoyable slice of camp that will probably end up with a cult following".

Karina Adelgaard of Heavens of Horror gave the film a rating of 4 out of 5, writing: "The way the budget is used for the many special effects is brilliant. We're talking a lot of practical effects and having things happen off-screen. Also, whenever something seems a bit strange, you can be sure that one of the characters will comment on it".
