= Cheddar Gorgeous =

British drag performer

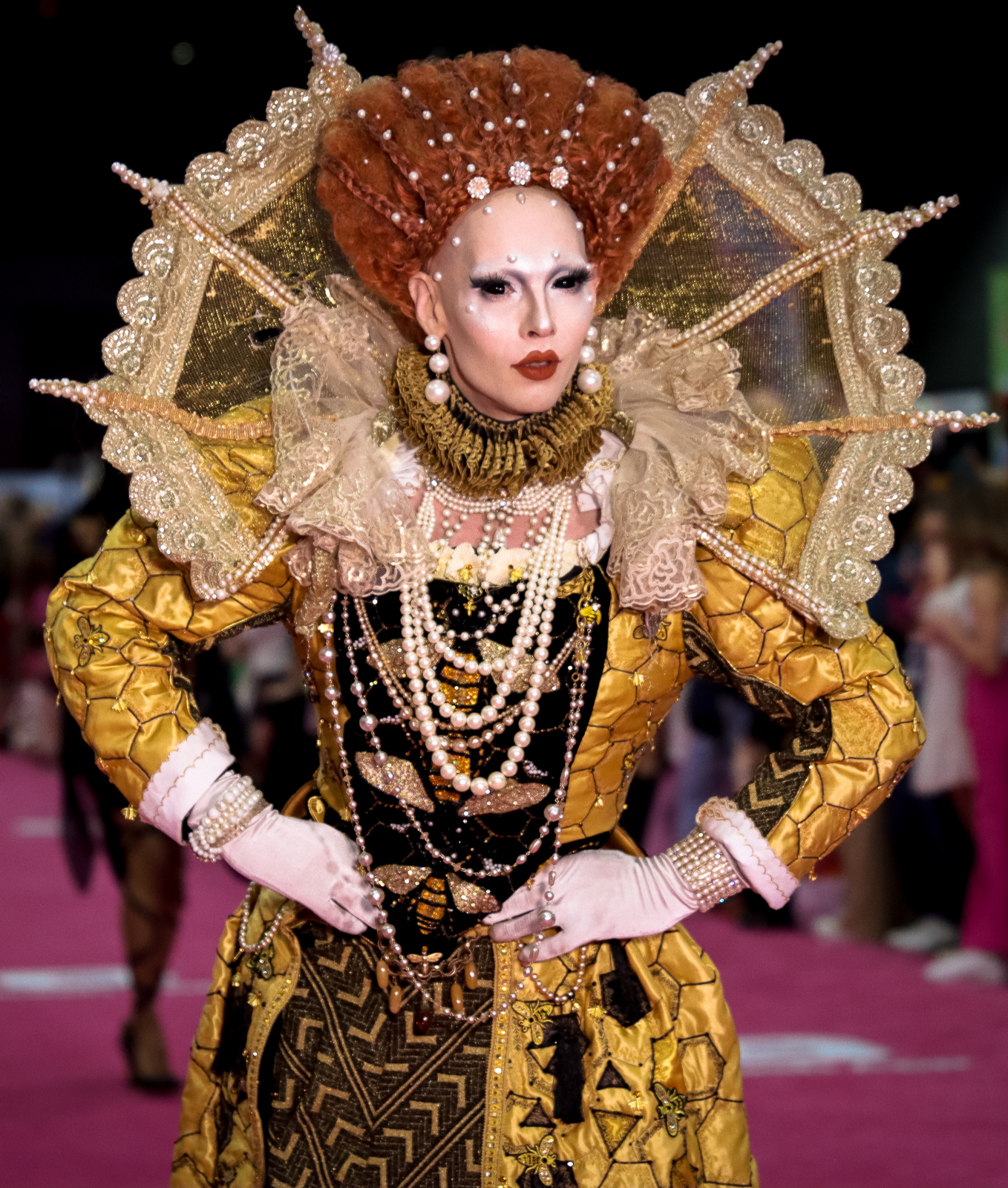
- Cheddar Gorgeous at RuPaul's DragCon LA, 2023
- Born: Michael Atkins; June 17, 1984 (age 41); Birmingham, England
- Education: University of Manchester (PhD)
- Occupation(s): Drag performer, academic
- Website: cheddar-gorgeous.co.uk

Cheddar Gorgeous is the stage name of Michael John Atkins, a British drag performer and academic who competed on series 4 of RuPaul's Drag Race UK.

== Career ==
Atkins competed as Cheddar Gorgeous on the fourth series of RuPaul's Drag Race UK, where she finished as the runner-up. She had previously appeared on Drag SOS. In 2023, Cheddar Gorgeous was a guest celebrity on series 5 of Glow Up: Britain's Next Make-Up Star airing on BBC Three. She won Celebrity Mastermind in 2023.

Formerly known as "Sisters Gorgeous" with her "drag sister" Anna Phylactic, the two formed "The Family Gorgeous", a drag house akin to the drag family model seen in the United States. Other members of this house include fellow Drag Race UK contestants Banksie and Lill.

== Personal life ==
Atkins was born in Birmingham and now lives in Manchester. His drag name comes from the landmark Cheddar Gorge.

Atkins holds a PhD in anthropology from the University of Manchester. In September 2023, Atkins began a postdoctoral fellowship at the University of Manchester.

== Discography ==
List of featured singles
Title	Year	Album
"Come Alive" (Queens of the Bone Age version) (with the cast of RuPaul's Drag Race UK, series 4)	2022	Non-album singles
"Lairy Poppins: The Rusical" (with the cast RuPaul's Drag Race UK, series 4)	2022	Non-album singles
"UK Grand Finale Megamix" (RuPaul featuring the cast RuPaul's Drag Race UK, series 4)	2022	Non-album singles
"Queen Bee" (Max Auton feat. Cheddar Gorgeous)	2024	Non-album singles

== Filmography ==
=== Film and television ===
Year	Title	Role	Notes	Ref.
2019	Drag SOS	Herself	Mentor	
2022	RuPaul's Drag Race UK series 4	Herself	Contestant	
2023	Glow Up: Britain's Next Make-Up Star series 5	Herself	Guest Judge	
2023	The After Shave with Danny Beard	Herself	Guest	
2023	Celebrity Mastermind (series 22)	Herself	Contestant (Winner)	
2024	Bring Back My Girls	Herself	Guest	

=== Music videos ===
Year	Title	Artist	Role
2020	"Nerves of Steel"	Erasure	Herself
