= RuPaul's Drag Race UK series 5 =

2023 series of RuPaul's Drag Race UK

RuPaul's Drag Race UK
- Series 5
- Promotional poster for Series 5
- Hosted by: RuPaul
- Judges: RuPaul; Michelle Visage; Alan Carr; Graham Norton
- No. of contestants: 10
- Winner: Ginger Johnson
- Runner-up: Michael Marouli
- No. of episodes: 10

Release
- Original network: BBC Three / BBC One (UK); WOW Presents Plus (International)
- Original release: 28 September – 30 November 2023

Season chronology
- ← Previous; Series 4 Next → Series 6

The fifth series of RuPaul's Drag Race UK began airing on BBC Three on 28 September 2023. RuPaul returned to his role as main host and head judge, and was again joined on the judging panel by Michelle Visage, Alan Carr and Graham Norton, all of whom returned for their respective fifth series. The series began filming in Pinewood Studios in January 2023. The cast for the fifth series was announced on 11 September 2023 on social media.

== Production ==
On 2 September 2022, prior to the beginning of the fourth series, it was announced via the show's social media pages that casting for the fifth series was now open. Applications remained open for two weeks until closing on 16 September 2022.

The fifth series of the show began filming in January 2023. Carol Vorderman was revealed to be appearing in a celebrity cameo in the fifth series of the show. Sophie Ellis-Bextor was subsequently spotted arriving to film the show. Sinitta was previously reported to have been signed as a guest judge for the fifth series, with a source stating: "Sinitta is one of the most exciting signings in the show's history. She's a bona fide gay icon and loves outrageous outfits, so she's perfect for Drag Race". Prior to the series, the show came under scrutiny for the contestants not receiving any cash prize compared to the other Drag Race franchises. Willam, who was a contestant on the fourth season of the American version, commented: "They need to pay the girls a prize. That is thousands and thousands and thousands of pounds worth of outfits and hair. Some of these girls are coming out in the red." Danny Beard, who won the previous series, said that they "could have bought a house", with the money spent preparing for RuPaul's Drag Race UK. On 30 August 2023, the BBC revealed the line up of guest judges and special guests for the fifth series including: Vorderman, Ellis-Bextor, Yasmin Finney, Suranne Jones, Kristen McMenamy, Karen Hauer, Aisling Bea, who appeared as a special guest in the previous series, Joel Dommett, Edward Enninful, Alexandra Burke, Cush Jumbo and Daphne Guinness who previously served as a guest judge on the seventh season of the American version spin-off RuPaul's Drag Race All Stars.

On 12 September 2023 an aftershow, named The After Shave with Danny Beard, was announced. In this series, the equivalent version of the American Whatcha Packin', features series 4 winner Danny Beard and guest, typically a former contestant from British adaptation, discussing the recently aired episode, besides interviewing the most recently eliminated queen about their run on the show.

It has been reported that an eleventh contestant was initially cast on the season, but was disqualified during filming due to alleged misconduct. The contestant was edited out of episodes prior to her disqualification, and was not included in either the cast announcement or any other promotional material relating to the series.

== Contestants ==
Ages, names, and cities stated are at time of filming.

Contestants of RuPaul's Drag Race UK series 5 and their backgrounds
Contestant	Age	Hometown	Outcome
Ginger Johnson	34	Lanchester, England	Winner
Michael Marouli	39	Newcastle upon Tyne, England	Runner-up
Tomara Thomas	25	Hartlepool, England	3rd place
DeDeLicious	20	Royal Tunbridge Wells, England	4th place
Kate Butch	26	Buxton, England	5th place
Cara Melle	26	London, England	6th place
Vicki Vivacious	36	Redruth, England	7th place
Banksie	23	Manchester, England	8th place
Miss Naomi Carter	23	Doncaster, England	9th place
Alexis Saint-Pete	28	London, England	10th place

== Contestant progress ==
Legend:

Ginger Johnson won RuPaul's Drag Race UK series 5.
Michael Marouli was the runner-up.
WIN indicates that the contestant won the challenge.
TOP2 indicates that the contestant was one of the two best performing in the challenge, but lost the lip sync to win it.
SAFE indicates that the contestant was declared safe by the judges.
BTM (Bottom) indicates that the contestant was up for elimination.
ELIM (Eliminated) indicates that the contestant was eliminated.
Guest indicates that the contestant returned as a guest.

Contestants progress with placements in each episode
Contestant	Episode									
Contestant	1	2	3	4	5	6	7	8	9	10
Ginger Johnson	SAFE	SAFE	SAFE	WIN	WIN	WIN	SAFE	SAFE	SAFE	Winner
Michael Marouli	SAFE	SAFE	SAFE	WIN	SAFE	SAFE	BTM	WIN	WIN	Runner-up
Tomara Thomas	SAFE	SAFE	TOP2	WIN	SAFE	SAFE	SAFE	SAFE	BTM	Eliminated
DeDeLicious	SAFE	SAFE	SAFE	SAFE	BTM	BTM	SAFE	BTM	ELIM	Guest
Kate Butch	SAFE	SAFE	SAFE	SAFE	SAFE	SAFE	WIN	ELIM	Guest	Guest
Cara Melle	TOP2	SAFE	WIN	BTM	SAFE	SAFE	ELIM			
Vicki Vivacious	WIN	SAFE	SAFE	SAFE	SAFE	ELIM			Guest	Guest
Banksie	SAFE	WIN	SAFE	SAFE	ELIM				Guest	Guest
Miss Naomi Carter	SAFE	BTM	SAFE	ELIM					Guest	Guest
Alexis Saint-Pete	SAFE	ELIM							Guest	Guest

== Lip syncs ==
Legend:

The contestant won the lip sync to win the challenge.
The contestant was eliminated after their first time in the bottom.
The contestant was eliminated after their second time in the bottom.
The contestant was eliminated after their fourth time in the bottom.
The contestant won the Lip Sync for the Crown and was declared the winner of the season.

Episode	Top contestants			Song	Winner
1	Cara Melle	vs.	Vicki Vivacious	"Ooh Aah... Just a Little Bit" (Gina G)	Vicki Vivacious
Episode	Bottom contestants			Song	Eliminated
2	Alexis Saint-Pete	vs.	Miss Naomi Carter	"Hot in It" (Tiësto, Charli XCX)	Alexis Saint-Pete
Episode	Top contestants			Song	Winner
3	Cara Melle	vs.	Tomara Thomas	"Remember" (Becky Hill, David Guetta)	Cara Melle
Episode	Bottom contestants			Song	Eliminated
4	Cara Melle	vs.	Miss Naomi Carter	"The Only Way Is Up" (Yazz)	Miss Naomi Carter
5	Banksie	vs.	DeDeLicious	"I Dreamed a Dream" (Susan Boyle)	Banksie
6	DeDeLicious	vs.	Vicki Vivacious	"Heartbreak on Hold" (Alexandra Burke)	Vicki Vivacious
7	Cara Melle	vs.	Michael Marouli	"Touch Me (I Want Your Body)" (Samantha Fox)	Cara Melle
8	DeDeLicious	vs.	Kate Butch	"This Hell" (Rina Sawayama)	Kate Butch
9	DeDeLicious	vs.	Tomara Thomas	"Little Bird" (Annie Lennox)	DeDeLicious
Episode	Final contestants			Song	Winner
10	Ginger Johnson	vs.	Michael Marouli	"A Little Respect" (Erasure)	Ginger Johnson

== Guest judges ==
Listed in chronological order:

- Kristen McMenamy, model
- Yasmin Finney, actress
- Sophie Ellis-Bextor, singer-songwriter
- Suranne Jones, actress
- Cush Jumbo, actress and writer
- Alexandra Burke, singer-songwriter and actress
- Joel Dommett, comedian, television presenter and actor
- Daphne Guinness, designer, actor, producer and musician
- Aisling Bea, comedian, actress and writer

=== Special guests ===
Guests who appeared in episodes, but did not judge on the main stage.

Episode 1

- Blu Hydrangea, contestant from RuPaul's Drag Race UK Series 1, and winner of UK vs. the World Series 1
- Jimbo, contestant from Canada's Drag Race Season 1 and UK vs. the World Series 1, and winner of All Stars 8
- Lady Camden, runner-up of RuPaul's Drag Race Season 14
- Nicky Doll, contestant from RuPaul's Drag Race Season 12, and host of Drag Race France
- Pangina Heals, co-host of Drag Race Thailand, and contestant from UK vs. the World Series 1
- Silky Nutmeg Ganache, contestant from RuPaul's Drag Race Season 11 and All Stars 6, and runner-up of Canada vs. the World Season 1
- Sminty Drop, contestant from RuPaul's Drag Race UK Series 4

Episode 2

- Edward Enninful, editor and stylist

Episode 3

- Ian Masterson, record producer and songwriter

Episode 4

- Raven, runner-up on both RuPaul's Drag Race Season 2 and All Stars 1

Episode 5

- Dane Chaflin, director and vocal coach
- Karen Hauer, professional ballroom dancer and choreographer

Episode 6

- Carol Vorderman, broadcaster and media personality

Episode 10

- Claudimar Neto, dancer and choreographer
- Danny Beard, winner of RuPaul's Drag Race UK Series 4

== Episodes ==
No. overall	No. in series	Title	Original release date
39	1	"Tickety-Boo"	28 September 2023
Ten new queens enter the workroom. For the first main challenge, the queens present three different looks: Entrance Looks, Club Tickety-Boo Looks, and Fierce Impressions. On the runway, category is Fierce Impressions Eleganza Extravaganza. Alexis Saint-Pete, Cara Melle, Ginger Johnson, Michael Marouli and Vicki Vivacious receive positive critiques. It is then revealed that Cara Melle and Vicki Vivacious are the top two queens of the week and lip sync for the win. They lip sync to "Ooh Aah... Just a Little Bit" by Gina G. After the lip sync, Vicki Vivacious is announced as the winner of the challenge. RuPaul then announces that no one is going home.: Guest Judge: Kristen McMenamy; Alternating Judge: Alan Carr; Main Challenge: Serve three looks: Entrance Looks, Club Tickety-Boo Looks and Fierce Impressions; Runway Theme: Fierce Impressions Eleganza Extravaganza; Top Two: Cara Melle and Vicki Vivacious; Lip Sync Song: "Ooh Aah... Just a Little Bit" by Gina G; Challenge Winner: Vicki Vivacious
40	2	"Purrfect Looks"	5 October 2023
For this week's mini-challenge, the queens pass along a handbag while music plays. The queen holding the handbag when the music stops assigns a superlative drawn from the bag to a fellow queen. Tomara Thomas ends up holding the handbag after the final round and therefore wins the mini-challenge. For this week's main challenge, the queens create an outfit from pet store items. On the runway, Banksie, DeDeLicious and Tomara Thomas receive positive critiques, with Banksie winning the challenge. Alexis Saint-Pete, Cara Melle and Miss Naomi Carter receive negative critiques, with Cara Melle being safe. Alexis Saint-Pete and Miss Naomi Carter lip sync to "Hot in It" by Tiësto and Charli XCX. Miss Naomi Carter wins the lip sync and Alexis Saint-Pete is the first queen to sashay away.: Guest Judge: Yasmin Finney; Alternating Judge: Graham Norton; Mini-Challenge: Let the Cat Out of the Bag; Mini-Challenge Winner: Tomara Thomas; Main Challenge: Create an outfit made from pet store items; Runway Theme: Pet Shop Girls Couture; Challenge Winner: Banksie; Bottom Two: Alexis Saint-Pete and Miss Naomi Carter; Lip Sync Song: "Hot in It" by Tiësto and Charli XCX; Eliminated: Alexis Saint-Pete; Farewell Message: "Always believe in yourself. Love you all so much. Alexis Saint-Pete"
41	3	"Club Bangers"	12 October 2023
For this week's main challenge, the queens write, record, and perform verses to "Don't Ick My Yum" in two groups.: Team Fierce Force Five: Cara Melle, DeDeLicious, Michael Marouli, Tomara Thomas, and Vicki Vivacious; Team The M-52's: Banksie, Ginger Johnson, Kate Butch, and Miss Naomi Carter; On the runway, category is Night of a Thousand Pop Icons. Team Fierce Force Five is announced as the winning team, with Cara Melle and Tomara Thomas being announced as the top two queens of the week, and will lip sync for the win. They lip sync to "Remember" by Becky Hill and David Guetta. After the lip sync, Cara Melle is announced as the winner of the challenge. RuPaul then announces that no one is going home.: Guest Judge: Sophie Ellis-Bextor; Alternating Judge: Graham Norton; Main Challenge: Write, record, and perform verses to "Don't Ick My Yum"; Runway Theme: Night of a Thousand Pop Icons; Top Two: Cara Melle and Tomara Thomas; Lip Sync Song: "Remember" by Becky Hill and David Guetta; Challenge Winner: Cara Melle
42	4	"DisasterClass"	19 October 2023
For this week's mini-challenge, the queens pose and deliver a sticky tag line for "S.P.N.K Protein". Tomara Thomas wins the mini-challenge. For the main challenge, the queens team up and deliver an inspirational seminar called "RuPaul's DisasterClass".: Werk: DeDeLicious, Kate Butch, and Miss Naomi Carter; Party: Ginger Johnson, Michael Marouli, and Tomara Thomas; Love: Banksie, Cara Melle, and Vicki Vivacious; On the runway, category is Slaycation. Team Party is the winning team, with Ginger Johnson, Michael Marouli and Tomara Thomas all winning the challenge. Team Werk and Team Love are the losing teams. Banksie, Cara Melle, Miss Naomi Carter and Vicki Vivacious receive negative critiques, with Banksie and Vicki Vivacious being safe. Cara Melle and Miss Naomi Carter lip sync to "The Only Way Is Up" by Yazz. Cara Melle wins the lip sync and Miss Naomi Carter sashays away.: Guest Judge: Suranne Jones; Alternating Judge: Alan Carr; Mini-Challenge: Pose and deliver a sticky tag line for "S.P.N.K Protein"; Mini-Challenge Winner: Tomara Thomas; Main Challenge: In teams, perform an inspirational seminar on different topics called "RuPaul's DisasterClass"; Runway Theme: Slaycation; Challenge Winners: Ginger Johnson, Michael Marouli and Tomara Thomas; Bottom Two: Cara Melle and Miss Naomi Carter; Lip Sync Song: "The Only Way Is Up" by Yazz; Eliminated: Miss Naomi Carter; Farewell Message: “Let me hear you say cinna bit Miss Carter love you all, have fun cleaning this 💋 xoxo"
43	5	"Pant-Oh She Better Don't!: The Rusical"	26 October 2023
For this week's mini-challenge, the queens read each other to filth. Kate Butch wins the mini-challenge. For the main challenge, the queens perform in Pant-Oh She Better Don't: The Rusical.: Banksie plays Butter Face; Cara Melle plays Lisa Thotlee; DeDeLicious plays Dame Muffin Top; Ginger Johnson plays Daisy the Cow; Kate Butch plays Twinkerbell; Michael Marouli plays Dick; Tomara Thomas plays Dee from Stairs; Vicki Vivacious plays Milkmaid; On the runway, category is Mirror, Mirror. Ginger Johnson, Kate Butch, Michael Marouli and Vicki Vivacious receive positive critiques, with Ginger Johnson winning the challenge. Banksie and DeDeLicious receive negative critiques, and are announced as the bottom two. They lip sync to "I Dreamed a Dream" by Susan Boyle. DeDeLicious wins the lip sync and Banksie sashays away.: Guest Judge: Cush Jumbo; Alternating Judge: Graham Norton; Mini-Challenge: Reading is Fundamental; Mini-Challenge Winner: Kate Butch; Main Challenge: Pant-Oh She Better Don't: The Rusical; Runway Theme: Mirror, Mirror; Challenge Winner: Ginger Johnson; Bottom Two: Banksie and DeDeLicious; Lip Sync Song: "I Dreamed a Dream" by Susan Boyle; Eliminated: Banksie; Farewell Message: "LOVE YOU SISTERS! ALL HAIL THE RAT QUEEN! BANKSIE x"
44	6	"Snatch Game"	2 November 2023
For this week's main challenge, the queens play the Snatch Game. Alexandra Burke and Carol Vorderman star as the celebrity contestants. The cast consists of: Cara Melle as Dionne Warwick; DeDeLicious as Lady Colin Campbell; Ginger Johnson as Dame Barbara Cartland; Kate Butch as Kate Bush; Michael Marouli as Catherine Tate (as Bernie and Derek Faye from The Catherine Tate Show); Tomara Thomas as Robin Williams (as Mrs. Doubtfire); Vicki Vivacious as Fanny Cradock; On the runway, category is Heart-Ons. Ginger Johnson, and Tomara Thomas receive positive critiques, with Ginger Johnson winning the challenge. Kate Butch receives positive critique for her Snatch Game performance and negative critique for her runway presentation. DeDeLicious and Vicki Vivacious receive negative critiques, and are announced as the bottom two. They lip sync to "Heartbreak on Hold" by Alexandra Burke. DeDeLicious wins the lip sync and Vicki Vivacious sashays away.: Guest Judge: Alexandra Burke; Alternating Judge: Alan Carr; Main Challenge: Snatch Game; Runway Theme: Heart-Ons; Challenge Winner: Ginger Johnson; Bottom Two: DeDeLicious and Vicki Vivacious; Lip Sync Song: "Heartbreak on Hold" by Alexandra Burke; Eliminated: Vicki Vivacious; Farewell Message: "I'm more iconic than the Cornish pasty! Love most of ya!! Vicki! ❤️"
45	7	"Melodrama-Rama"	9 November 2023
For this week's mini-challenge, the queens have a bitchfest with puppets. Ginger Johnson wins the mini-challenge. For the main challenge, the queens pair up and perform in screen tests for a romantic drama.: Femmerdale: DeDeLicious and Tomara Thomas; Footballers' Wags: Cara Melle and Michael Marouli; Holedark: Ginger Johnson and Kate Butch; On the runway, category is Pajamarama. All queens receive positive critiques; Ginger Johnson and Kate Butch receive the best critiques, with Kate Butch winning the challenge. Cara Melle and Michael Marouli are deemed by RuPaul to have been the least funniest in the challenge and are announced as the bottom two, with DeDeLicious and Tomara Thomas being safe. They lip sync to "Touch Me (I Want Your Body)" by Samantha Fox. Michael Marouli wins the lip sync and Cara Melle sashays away.: Guest Judge: Joel Dommett; Alternating Judge: Alan Carr; Mini-Challenge: Everybody Loves Puppets; Mini-Challenge Winner: Ginger Johnson; Main Challenge: In pairs, perform in screen tests for a romantic drama; Runway Theme: Pajamarama; Challenge Winner: Kate Butch; Bottom Two: Cara Melle and Michael Marouli; Lip Sync Song: "Touch Me (I Want Your Body)" by Samantha Fox; Eliminated: Cara Melle; Farewell Message: "Sweet, salty, sticky. You're all nasty... J.K. Love you forever. Cara Melle"
46	8	"Hotline Makeover"	16 November 2023
For this week's main challenge, the queens makeover hotline workers of Switchboard, the UK's second-oldest LGBTQ+ hotline. On the runway, category is Drag Family Resemblance. Ginger Johnson, Michael Marouli and Tomara Thomas receive positive critiques, with Michael Marouli winning the challenge. DeDeLicious and Kate Butch receive negative critiques, and are announced as the bottom two. They lip sync to "This Hell" by Rina Sawayama. DeDeLicious wins the lip sync and Kate Butch sashays away.: Guest Judge: Daphne Guinness; Alternating Judge: Graham Norton; Main Challenge: Makeover hotline workers of Switchboard, the UK's second-oldest LGBTQ+ hotline; Runway Theme: Drag Family Resemblance; Challenge Winner: Michael Marouli; Bottom Two: DeDeLicious and Kate Butch; Lip Sync Song: "This Hell" by Rina Sawayama; Eliminated: Kate Butch; Farewell Message: "It's me, I'm Kathy, I've gone home. Hope you all lose, xoxo Kate Butch. BALEGDEH"
47	9	"The Dragiators' Roast"	23 November 2023
For this week's main challenge, the queens perform a roast of the judges and the eliminated queens of season 5. On the runway, category is Poofs on Parade. Ginger Johnson and Michael Marouli receive positive critiques, with Michael Marouli winning the challenge. DeDeLicious and Tomara Thomas receive the worst critiques, and are announced as the bottom two. They lip sync to "Little Bird" by Annie Lennox. Tomara Thomas wins the lip sync and DeDeLicious sashays away.: Guest Judge: Aisling Bea; Alternating Judge: Alan Carr; Main Challenge: Perform a roast of the judges and the eliminated queens of Series 5; Runway Theme: Poofs on Parade; Challenge Winner: Michael Marouli; Bottom Two: DeDeLicious and Tomara Thomas; Lip Sync Song: "Little Bird" by Annie Lennox; Eliminated: DeDeLicious; Farewell Message: "Mimilicious out! Huge congrats to the top three. Love you all xxx❤️"
48	10	"Grand Finale"	30 November 2023
For the final challenge of the season, the queens write, record and perform their own verses to a remix of RuPaul's song "Spotlight". On the runway, category is Grand Finale Eleganza, Dripping in Jewels. The eliminated queens all return to the runway. Tomara Thomas is eliminated, leaving Ginger Johnson and Michael Marouli as the top two queens of the season. They lip-sync to "A Little Respect" by Erasure. It is announced that Ginger Johnson is the winner, leaving Michael Marouli as the runner-up.: Alternating Judges: Alan Carr and Graham Norton; Main Challenge: Write, record and perform their own verses to a remix of RuPaul's song "Spotlight"; Runway Theme: Grand Finale Eleganza, Dripping in Jewels; Eliminated: Tomara Thomas; Final Two: Ginger Johnson and Michael Marouli; Lip-Sync Song: "A Little Respect" by Erasure; Runner-up: Michael Marouli; Winner of RuPaul's Drag Race UK Series Five: Ginger Johnson
