= Rusical =

Musical production on the TV series RuPaul's Drag Race

Montage of screenshots from various Rusicals

A Rusical (portmanteau of "RuPaul" and "musical") is a musical theatre challenge recurring across the Drag Race television franchise. Rusical productions began in 2014 during the sixth season of the American series, and have subsequently become "a highly anticipated staple" of the reality competition, allowing contestants to showcase their talents.

== Rusicals by series ==
=== RuPaul's Drag Race ===
Season nine's Rusical (Kardashians: The Musical) was inspired by the musical Hamilton. The American series has also seen Rusicals about Cher, Donald Trump, and Madonna. Seasons fourteen and fifteen had parodies of the films Moulin Rouge! and Footloose respectively. Season sixteen's Rusical was a parody of the musical The Sound of Music and its film adaptation. The Rusical on season seventeen was inspired by The Wizard of Oz and its musical adaptations Wicked and The Wiz.

Rusicals of RuPaul's Drag Race
| Season | Rusical | Winner |
|---|---|---|
| 6 | Shade: The Rusical | Courtney Act |
| 7 | Glamazonian Airways | Ginger Minj |
| 8 | Bitch Perfect | Chi Chi DeVayne |
| 9 | Kardashians: The Musical | Shea Couleé |
| 10 | PharmaRusical | The Vixen |
| 10 | Cher: The Unauthorized Rusical | Kameron Michaels |
| 11 | Trump: The Rusical | Silky Nutmeg Ganache |
| 12 | Madonna: The Unauthorized Rusical | Gigi Goode |
| 12 | Viva Drag Vegas | Gigi Goode |
| 13 | Social Media: The Unverified Rusical | Rosé |
| 14 | Moulin Ru: The Rusical | Lady Camden |
| 15 | Wigloose: The Rusical! | Anetra |
| 16 | The Sound of Rusic | Plasma |
| 17 | The Wicked Wiz of Oz: The Rusical! | Sam Star |
| 18 | Fannie: The Hard Knock Ball Rusical | Jane Don't |

=== RuPaul's Drag Race All Stars ===
The Rusical in the second season of RuPaul's Drag Race All Stars depicted historical women. Alaska, Alyssa Edwards, Detox, and Ginger Minj portrayed a Britney Spears-inspired Eve, Annie Oakley, Marie Antoinette, and Catherine the Great, respectively. Katya and Phi Phi O'Hara portrayed Princess Diana and Helen of Troy, respectively.

On the show's third season ("Divas Lip Sync Live"), Aja performed as Amy Winehouse, BeBe Zahara Benet as Diana Ross, BenDeLaCreme as Julie Andrews, Chi Chi DeVayne as Patti LaBelle, Kennedy Davenport as Janet Jackson, Milk as Celine Dion, Shangela as Mariah Carey, Trixie Mattel as Dolly Parton, and Thorgy Thor as Stevie Nicks.

The sixth season's Rusical (episode "Halftime Headliners") was based on Super Bowl's halftime show performances. The eighth season's Rusical was based on the life of Joan Crawford. The ninth and tenth season's Rusicals were inspired by the film Rosemary's Baby (1968) and RuPaul's film Starrbooty (2007), respectively.

Rusicals of RuPaul's Drag Race All Stars
| Season | Rusical | Winner(s) |
|---|---|---|
| 2 | HERstory of the World | Alyssa Edwards |
| 2 | HERstory of the World | Detox |
| 3 | Divas Lip Sync Live | BenDeLaCreme |
| 3 | Divas Lip Sync Live | Shangela |
| 6 | All Stars 6 Hall of Fame Halftime Show | Jan |
| 8 | Joan: The Unauthorized Rusical! | Kandy Muse |
| 9 | Rosemarie's Baby Shower: The Rusical | Jorgeous |
| 9 | Rosemarie's Baby Shower: The Rusical | Shannel |
| 10 | Starrbooty: The Rebooty | Jorgeous |
| 10 | Starrbooty: The Rebooty | Lydia B Kollins |

=== RuPaul's Secret Celebrity Drag Race ===
The Rusical on season 1 of RuPaul's Secret Celebrity Drag Race was about Dolly Parton and her 1980 comedy film 9 to 5.

Rusicals of RuPaul's Secret Celebrity Drag Race
| Season | Rusical | Winner |
|---|---|---|
| 1 | Twerking 5 to 9: The Rusical | —N/a |

=== Canada's Drag Race ===
The clown-themed Rusical of season 2 was inspired by the 1938 film Under the Big Top. On season 4, the Rusical was about the life of host Brooke Lynn Hytes.

Rusicals of Canada's Drag Race
| Season | Rusical | Winner |
|---|---|---|
| 2 | Under the Big Top | Pythia |
| 3 | Squirrels Trip: The Rusical | Vivian Vanderpuss |
| 4 | From Drags to Riches: The Rusical | Aurora Matrix |

==== Canada's Drag Race: Canada vs. the World ====
The second season of Canada's Drag Race: Canada vs. the World had a Rusical about the Snatch Game.

Rusicals of Canada's Drag Race: Canada vs. the World
| Season | Rusical | Winner |
|---|---|---|
| 2 | Snatch Game: The Rusical | Lemon |

=== Drag Race España ===
The second season of Drag Race España had a Rusical based on the musical La llamada. The third season had a Rusical inspired by The Wonderful Wizard of Oz setting the story during the La Movida Madrileña countercultural movement. The fourth season's Rusical was an homage to Spanish musical artists across the last century. The fifth season had a Rusical inspired by the Federico García Lorca play The House of Bernarda Alba.

Rusicals of Drag Race España
| Season | Rusical | Winner |
|---|---|---|
| 2 | La Llamadrag | Estrella Xtravaganza |
| 3 | El Mago Precoz | Pitita |
| 4 | Eternas | Vampirashian |
| 5 | Vais a volverme Lorca | Nix |
| 6 | El Ladrillo de Oro | Buba Anorex |

=== Drag Race France ===
Rusicals of Drag Race France
| Season | Rusical | Winner |
|---|---|---|
| 2 | Le Bossu de Notre Drag | Keiona |
| 3 | Céline Dion: The Rusical | Leona Winter |
| 4 | Drag Vinci Code: The Rusical | Fluffy Bidule |

=== Drag Race Germany ===
Rusicals of Drag Race Germany
| Season | Rusical | Winner |
|---|---|---|
| 1 | Dragort: The Rusical | Metamorkid |

=== Drag Race Holland ===
The Rusical for the second season of Drag Race Holland was based on the story of Cinderella.

Rusicals of Drag Race Holland
| Season | Rusical | Winner |
|---|---|---|
| 1 | Máxima: The Rusical | Janey Jacké |
| 2 | CindeRulla: The Rusical | My Little Puny |

=== Drag Race Italia ===
The second season of Drag Race Italia had a Rusical dedicated to Lady Gaga.

Rusicals of Drag Race Italia
| Season | Rusical | Winner |
|---|---|---|
| 1 | Carrà: The Rusical | Divinity |
| 2 | Lady Gaga: The Unauthorised Rusical | La Petite Noire |
| 3 | Paola & Chiara: An Unauthorised Fairytale Rusical | Sypario |

=== Drag Race México ===
The first season of Drag Race México had a Rusical based on Acapulco Shore, the Mexican spin-off series of Jersey Shore. The Rusical in the second season was inspired by three telenovelas starring Thalía: María Mercedes, Marimar, and María la del Barrio.

Rusicals of Drag Race México
| Season | Rusical | Winner |
|---|---|---|
| 1 | Dragapulco Shore: The Rusical | Cristian Peralta |
| 2 | The Three Marías: The Rusical | Jenary Bloom |

=== Drag Race Philippines ===
The second season of Drag Race Philippines had a Rusical inspired by the film The Little Mermaid. The Rusical in the third season was inspired by Wicked.

Rusicals of Drag Race Philippines
| Season | Rusical | Winner |
|---|---|---|
| 1 | OPM Divas: The Rusical | Precious Paula Nicole |
| 2 | Sirena: The Rusical | DeeDee Marié Holliday |
| 3 | AaWicked Kita: The Rusical | Zymba Ding |
| 4 | The Gayest Shokla: The Rusical | Katana |

==== Drag Race Philippines: Slaysian Royale ====
The first season had a Rusical inspired by Crazy Rich Asians.

Rusicals of Drag Race Philippines: Slaysian Royale
| Season | Rusical | Winner(s) |
|---|---|---|
| 1 | Crazy Bitch Slaysians: The Musical | Arizona Brandy |
| 1 | Crazy Bitch Slaysians: The Musical | Brigiding |

=== Drag Race Thailand ===
Rusicals of Drag Race Thailand
| Season | Rusical | Winner |
|---|---|---|
| 2 | Apaporn Nakornsawan: Thai Musical | Kandy Zyanide |
| 3 | Kraitong: The Rusical | Gawdland |

=== RuPaul's Drag Race UK ===
The Rusicals in the second and fourth seasons of RuPaul's Drag Race UK were inspired by the musicals Cats and Mary Poppins, respectively. The Rusical in the fifth season was a pantomime.

Rusicals of RuPaul's Drag Race UK
| Series | Rusical | Winner(s) |
|---|---|---|
| 2 | Rats: The Rusical | Veronica Green |
| 4 | Lairy Poppins: The Rusical | Danny Beard |
| 5 | Pant-Oh She Better Don't!: The Rusical | Ginger Johnson |
| 6 | Pop of the Tops – Live: The Rusical | La Voix |
| 7 | Peter Pansy: The Rusical | Elle Vosque |
| 7 | Peter Pansy: The Rusical | Paige Three |
| 8 | Croydon: The Rusical – Live | KY Kelly |
| 8 | Croydon: The Rusical – Live | Mocha |

==== RuPaul's Drag Race: UK vs. the World ====
Rusicals of RuPaul's Drag Race: UK vs. the World
| Season | Rusical | Winner(s) |
|---|---|---|
| 1 | West End Wendys | Janey Jacké |
| 1 | West End Wendys | Pangina Heals |
| 2 | Seven!: Confessions of a Drag Queen | Marina Summers |
| 2 | Seven!: Confessions of a Drag Queen | Tia Kofi |
