= Kori King =

American drag performer (born 2000)

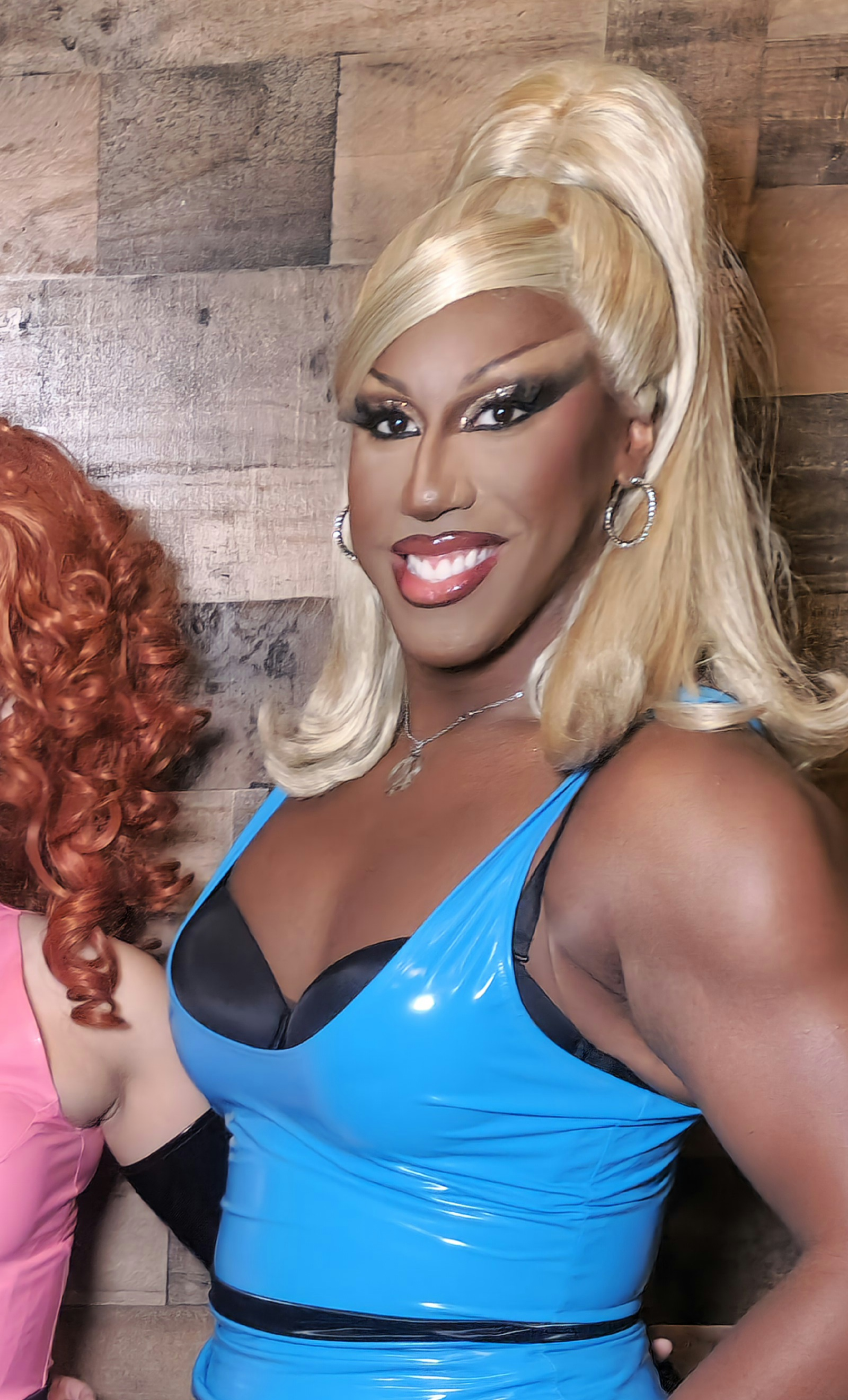
- Kori King in October 2025
- Born: Rashawn King; March 13, 2000 (age 26); Boston, Massachusetts, U.S.
- Occupation: Drag performer
- Years active: 2022–present
- Television: RuPaul's Drag Race (season 17)
- Partner: Lydia B Kollins (2024–present)

Rashawn King (born March 13, 2000), known professionally as Kori King, is an American drag performer who competed on the seventeenth season of RuPaul's Drag Race.

== Early life and education ==
Rashawn King was born on March 13, 2000 and raised in Boston. His father is Trinidadian and his mother is Portuguese and Native American. His parents are divorced. He attended Boston Arts Academy for visual arts. He then studied communication in college, but dropped out after a year. King has a background in animation. Before starting his drag career, King was a pharmacy technician and store manager at Walgreens.

== Career ==
King's drag persona is Kori King, billed as the "Black Barbie of Boston". In 2023, she performed alongside Kesha as part of the Only Love Tour. That same year, she was awarded the "Boston's Best New Performer to Watch" award. She also played Ariel in a local Little Mermaid-themed drag show. Kori King acquired large followings on TikTok and YouTube early in her career. Ian Helms included her in Queerty's 2024 list of Boston's top twenty drag performers.

Kori King was included in INTO Magazine's "25 Under 25" list in 2025. She signed with CAA in 2026.

=== RuPaul's Drag Race ===
Kori King competed on the seventeenth season (2025) of RuPaul's Drag Race. She entered the Werk Room on the premiere episode wearing an outfit inspired by Dunkin' Donuts. She was named the "trade" of the season by her castmates. On the fourth episode, Kori King placed in the bottom two and defeated Joella in a lip-sync contest to "Buttons" by The Pussycat Dolls in order to remain in the competition. Kori King impersonated Big Ang for the Snatch Game challenge on the seventh episode. She placed in the bottom again on the eighth episode, defeating Acacia Forgot in a lip-sync to "Wet Dream" by Adam Lambert. She was eliminated from the competition on the ninth episode, after placing the bottom two of a design challenge and losing a lip-sync contest against Lydia B Kollins. Kori King placed ninth overall. Pride.com and PinkNews have described her as a "fan favorite".

On the fifteenth episode, ahead of the season finale, Kori King competed in the lip sync contest known as the "Lip Sync LaLaPaRuza Smackdown", which pitted all of the season's eliminated queens against one another in a lip sync battle tournament. After defeating Arrietty, Lana Ja'Rae, and her romantic partner Lydia B Kollins in the preliminary battles, Kori King advanced to the final round, where she lipsynced against Suzie Toot to "Apt." (2024) by Rosé and Bruno Mars. Ultimately, Suzie Toot was pronounced victorious by RuPaul, thus making Kori King the second place runner-up of the LaLaPaRuza tournament. Kori King's Instagram following grew by 783 percent as the show aired.

=== Cameo career and social media presence ===
After the completion of season 17, King became the most popular video creator on the online Cameo platform, which King uses to sell custom-made videos of herself parodying fictional characters and celebrities. One of the more popular characters King portrays on the site is "Kori Toot", which is a parodical reference to fellow contestant Suzie Toot and her 'vintage glamour' style of drag. Kori King has also impersonated The Lorax, Shrek, and JoJo Siwa, along with Michael Jackson on the 2025 Emmys Red Carpet, where she explained that she wanted to be "comfortable and chic" despite judgement from others. When asked about her Michael Jackson drag at the season 17 grand finale, King stated that, "I haven’t heard anything from the Michael Jackson society. It’s just funny; it’s comedy. When I’m getting in drag, I want to laugh. I was in that drag for literally 12 hours, and I was exhausted."

After being displaced from the top position on Cameo by Nikki Blonsky in April 2025, King jokingly stated to a reporter that she hopes "Blonsky falls off the face of the Earth and gets banned".

== Personal life ==
King is dating Drag Race co-star Lydia B Kollins. In 2025, he moved from Boston to Pittsburgh, Lydia's hometown. Kori King is the "drag sister" of Plane Jane, who competed on the sixteenth season of Drag Race.

== Discography ==
All credits adapted from Apple Music and Spotify.

=== Singles ===
==== As lead artist ====
Year	Title	Album	Writer(s)	Producer(s)
2025	“Cameo Christmas” (with Plane Jane)	Non-album singles	Kori King, Big Atlas, Patty Bourrée, Plane Jane	Big Atlas
2025	"Shake That Ice"	Non-album singles	Kori King, Big Atlas	Big Atlas

==== As featured artist ====
Year	Title	Artist(s)	Album	Writer(s)	Producer(s)
2025	"Dynasty"	Kori King, Lavagirl, Plane Jane, Binx, Big Jahnelle, Big Atlas, Sticki Honey, Gigi Glam, Secret Queen, Shakaren	Non-album single	Kori King, Lavagirl, Plane Jane, Binx, Big Jahnelle, Big Atlas, Sticki Honey, Gigi Glam, Secret Queen, Shakaren	Big Atlas

== Filmography ==
=== Television ===
- RuPaul's Drag Race (season 17, 2025)
- RuPaul's Drag Race: Untucked (2025)

=== Web series ===
- Life's a Drag ("Let the Shade Begin"), 2023
- The Pit Stop
- Whatcha Packin' (2025), hosted by Michelle Visage
- Hello Hello Hello (2025), hosted by Kyran Thrax, World of Wonder
- Pillow Talk, with Lydia B Kollins
- Kudos for Spilling (episode "Waking It Up with Kori King"), with Plane Jane

== See also ==
- List of people from Boston
