= RuPaul's Drag Race UK series 4 =

2022 series of RuPaul's Drag Race UK

RuPaul's Drag Race UK
- Series 4
- Promotional poster for Series 4
- Hosted by: RuPaul
- Judges: RuPaul; Michelle Visage; Alan Carr; Graham Norton
- No. of contestants: 12
- Winner: Danny Beard
- Runner-up: Cheddar Gorgeous
- No. of episodes: 10

Release
- Original network: BBC Three / BBC One (UK); WOW Presents Plus (International)
- Original release: 22 September – 24 November 2022

Series chronology
- ← Previous; Series 3 Next → Series 5

The fourth series of RuPaul's Drag Race UK began airing on BBC Three on 22 September 2022. RuPaul returned to his role as main host and head judge, and was again joined on the judging panel by Michelle Visage, Alan Carr and Graham Norton, all of whom returned for their respective fourth series. The series was filmed in Pinewood Studios in February 2022. The cast for the fourth series was revealed on 7 September 2022 on social media. The cast also featured Dakota Schiffer, the first out trans woman to compete in the British version of the show.

The winner of the fourth series of RuPaul's Drag Race UK was Danny Beard, with Cheddar Gorgeous as the runner-up.

== Production ==
On 27 October 2021, it was announced via the shows official Instagram page, that casting for the fourth series was now open. Applications remained open for two weeks until closing on 10 November 2021. Hannah Waddingham revealed herself to be first celebrity guest judge during an interview on Jimmy Kimmel Live, hosted by RuPaul. The fourth series was the first regular series of the show to be broadcast on BBC Three following RuPaul's Drag Race: UK vs the World earlier in the year, with the show's success being credited in the decision to bring back the previously defunct television channel. On 30 August 2022, a ten-second teaser was released by the BBC to promote the series premiere with the caption "Bring it to the RUNW4Y". The BBC released the list of celebrity guest judges the following day.

Judge Graham Norton revealed in an interview with Gay Times that the competitors that appeared on the fourth series were "some of the best queens we've ever seen". Norton said because the series was a post-COVID-19 season, the queens had a lot more freedom and that it was, "very hard for the [season three] queens in COVID because they weren't making any money and lots of the dressmakers had stopped working. I think it was really hard during COVID, so this is definitely a post-COVID season and it's great. You can look forward to it. You don't need to worry!" It was revealed that executives had recruited former The Jeremy Kyle Show bodyguard known as "Big Steve", to work on the show. On 1 September 2022, the BBC announced the series would premiere on 22 September, to coincide with the conclusion of the third season of Canada's Drag Race and the second season of RuPaul's Drag Race Down Under.

In September 2022, the BBC reported that Series 2 contestant, Cherry Valentine, had died at the age of 28. Subsequently, the second episode from Series 4 was dedicated to Cherry Valentine in their memory on 29 September 2022. RuPaul missed filming during Episode 7, therefore Visage took over as main judge and host, whilst Raven took Visage's spot on the judging panel. It subsequently made it the first episode RuPaul has missed from across all Drag Race franchises hosted by RuPaul himself. Coincidentally, it made Raven the first former Drag Race contestant to judge on a RuPaul fronted franchise.

== Contestants ==
Ages, names, and cities stated are at time of filming.

Contestants of RuPaul's Drag Race UK series 4 and their backgrounds
Contestant	Age	Hometown	Outcome
Danny Beard	29	Liverpool, England	Winner
Cheddar Gorgeous	38	Manchester, England	Runner-up
Black Peppa	29	Birmingham, England	3rd place
Jonbers Blonde	33	Belfast, Northern Ireland	3rd place
Pixie Polite	29	Brighton, England	5th place
Dakota Schiffer	22	Horsham, England	6th place
Le Fil	36	Brighouse, England	7th place
Baby	25	South London, England	8th place (Note: Baby quit the competition after the lip sync.)
Sminty Drop	23	Clitheroe, England	9th place
Copper Topp	38	Cheltenham, England	10th place
Starlet	23	Reigate, England	11th place
Just May	32	Essex, England	12th place

== Contestant progress ==
Legend:

Danny Beard won RuPaul's Drag Race UK series 4.
Cheddar Gorgeous was the runner-up.
WIN indicates that the contestant won the challenge.
SAFE indicates that the contestant was declared safe by the judges.
BTM (Bottom) indicates that the contestant was up for elimination.
ELIM (Eliminated) indicates that the contestant was eliminated.
QUIT indicates that Baby quit the competition.
Guest indicates that the contestant returned as a guest.

Contestants progress with placements in each episode
Contestant	Episode									
Contestant	1	2	3	4	5	6	7	8	9	10
Danny Beard	SAFE	WIN	SAFE	WIN	WIN	SAFE	SAFE	SAFE	WIN	Winner
Cheddar Gorgeous	SAFE	WIN	SAFE	SAFE	SAFE	WIN	WIN	WIN	SAFE	Runner-up
Black Peppa	WIN	SAFE	BTM	SAFE	SAFE	BTM	SAFE	BTM	BTM	Eliminated
Jonbers Blonde	SAFE	BTM	SAFE	SAFE	SAFE	SAFE	SAFE	BTM	SAFE	Eliminated
Pixie Polite	SAFE	WIN	SAFE	SAFE	SAFE	SAFE	BTM	SAFE	ELIM	Guest
Dakota Schiffer	BTM	WIN	WIN	SAFE	BTM	SAFE	ELIM		Guest	Guest
Le Fil	SAFE	WIN	SAFE	SAFE	SAFE	ELIM			Guest	Guest
Baby	SAFE	SAFE	WIN	BTM	QUIT					
Sminty Drop	SAFE	SAFE	SAFE	ELIM					Guest	Guest
Copper Topp	SAFE	WIN	ELIM						Guest	Guest
Starlet	SAFE	ELIM							Guest	Guest
Just May	ELIM								Guest	Guest

== Lip syncs ==
Legend:

The contestant was eliminated after their first time in the bottom.
The contestant was eliminated after their second time in the bottom.
The contestant was eliminated after their third time in the bottom.
Baby was in the bottom two, but quit the competition following the lip sync.
The contestant won the Lip Sync for the Crown and was declared the winner of the season.

Episode	Bottom contestants			Song	Eliminated
1	Dakota Schiffer	vs.	Just May	"Let Them Know" (Mabel)	Just May
2	Jonbers Blonde	vs.	Starlet	"About You Now" (Sugababes)	Starlet
3	Black Peppa	vs.	Copper Topp	"This Is Real" (Jax Jones ft. Ella Henderson)	Copper Topp
4	Baby	vs.	Sminty Drop	"Respectable" (Mel and Kim)	Sminty Drop
5	Baby	vs.	Dakota Schiffer	"No Way" (The Cast of Six ft. Renée Lamb)	Baby
6	Black Peppa	vs.	Le Fil	"Stop" (Spice Girls)	Le Fil
7	Dakota Schiffer	vs.	Pixie Polite	"Miss Me Blind" (Culture Club)	Dakota Schiffer
8	Black Peppa	vs.	Jonbers Blonde	"Some Kinda Rush" (Booty Luv)	None
9	Black Peppa	vs.	Pixie Polite	"Another One Bites the Dust" (Queen)	Pixie Polite
Episode	Final contestants			Song	Winner
10	Cheddar Gorgeous	vs.	Danny Beard	"This Is My Life" (Shirley Bassey)	Danny Beard

== Guest judges ==
Listed in chronological order:

- Dame Joanna Lumley, actress
- FKA Twigs, singer and actress
- Leomie Anderson, model
- Alison Hammond, television presenter
- Hannah Waddingham, actress and singer
- Mel B, singer
- Boy George, singer
- Raven, drag queen and make-up artist
- Lorraine Pascale, chef
- Olly Alexander, singer and actor

=== Special guests ===
Guests who appeared in episodes, but did not judge on the main stage.

Episode 1

- Guy Levy, photographer

Episode 2

- Cathy Dennis, singer-songwriter
- Leland, producer
- Freddy Scott, producer and songwriter

Episode 5

- Dane Chalfin, vocal coach
- Giovanni Pernice, professional ballroom dancer and choreographer

Episode 6

- Baga Chipz, contestant from RuPaul's Drag Race UK Series 1 and UK vs. the World Series 1
- Tess Daly, television presenter
- AJ Odudu, television presenter

Episode 9

- Aisling Bea, comedian

Episode 10

- Claudimar Neto, dancer and choreographer
- The Vivienne, winner of RuPaul's Drag Race UK Series 1
- Lawrence Chaney, winner of RuPaul's Drag Race UK Series 2
- Krystal Versace, winner of RuPaul's Drag Race UK Series 3

== Episodes ==
No. overall	No. in series	Title	Original release date
29	1	"ST4RT Your Engines"	22 September 2022
Twelve new queens enter the werkroom. For the first mini-challenge, the queens do a photoshoot inspired by the Spice Girls' Olympics performance. Black Peppa wins the mini-challenge. For the main challenge, the queens present two looks on the runway: BBC Keeping It 100 and Ru Are You?: Baby as Rastamouse; Black Peppa as Mr Blobby; Cheddar Gorgeous as BBC Test Card F; Copper Topp as Julie Walters in the Two Soups sketch; Dakota Schiffer as Anne Boleyn in Horrible Histories; Danny Beard as Mr Blobby; Jonbers Blonde as Blue Peter; Just May as The Queen Victoria bust from EastEnders; Le Fil as Pudsey Bear; Pixie Polite as Del Boy; Sminty Drop as Antiques Roadshow; Starlet as Patsy Stone; On the runway, Black Peppa, Sminty Drop and Starlet receive positive critiques, with Black Peppa winning the challenge. Copper Topp, Dakota Schiffer and Just May receive negative critiques, with Copper Topp being safe. Dakota Schiffer and Just May lip-sync to "Let Them Know" by Mabel. Dakota Schiffer wins the lip-sync and Just May is the first queen to sashay away.: Guest Judge: Dame Joanna Lumley; Alternating Judge: Graham Norton; Mini-Challenge: Photoshoot inspired by the Spice Girls' Olympics performance; Mini-Challenge Winner: Black Peppa; Main Challenge: Present two looks on the runway; Runway Themes: BBC Keeping It 100 and Ru Are You?; Challenge Winner: Black Peppa; Bottom Two: Dakota Schiffer and Just May; Lip-Sync Song: "Let Them Know" by Mabel; Eliminated: Just May; Farewell Message: It was gonna be MAY! Love you all x
30	2	"Yass-tonbury Festival"	29 September 2022
For this week's main challenge, the queens write, record, and perform verses to "Come Alive".: Team Queens of the Bone Age: Cheddar Gorgeous, Copper Topp, Dakota Schiffer, Danny Beard, Le Fil, and Pixie Polite; Team The Triple Threats: Baby, Black Peppa, Jonbers Blonde, Sminty Drop, and Starlet; On the runway, category is Neon Nights. Team "Queens of the Bone Age" is the winning team, with Cheddar Gorgeous, Copper Topp, Dakota Schiffer, Danny Beard, Le Fil and Pixie Polite all winning the challenge. Team "The Triple Threats" is the losing team. Jonbers Blonde, Sminty Drop and Starlet receive negative critiques, with Sminty Drop being safe. Jonbers Blonde and Starlet lip-sync to "About You Now" by Sugababes. Jonbers Blonde wins the lip-sync and Starlet sashays away.: Guest Judge: FKA Twigs; Alternating Judge: Graham Norton; Main Challenge: Write, record, and perform verses to "Come Alive"; Runway Theme: Neon Nights; Challenge Winners: Cheddar Gorgeous, Copper Topp, Dakota Schiffer, Danny Beard, Le Fil, and Pixie Polite; Bottom Two: Jonbers Blonde and Starlet; Lip-Sync Song: "About You Now" by Sugababes; Eliminated: Starlet; Farewell Message: Every fairytale has an ending, but this is only the beginning. xxx ⭐️
31	3	"Naff-ta Awards"	6 October 2022
For this week's mini-challenge, the queens vote for a random queen at the Naff-ta Awards, with categories being: Beast in Show, Best Background Actress in a Non-Speaking Role, Best Scene Stealing Attention Grabbing Camera Hog, Best Actress Resting on Pretty and Best Hot Mess. Black Peppa, Copper Topp, Danny Beard, Baby and Sminty Drop win the mini-challenge, respectively. For this week's main challenge, the queens pair up and create a look with the same colors and fabrics.: Black - Baby and Dakota Schiffer; Blue - Le Fil and Sminty Drop; Gold - Cheddar Gorgeous and Copper Topp; Green - Black Peppa and Jonbers Blonde; Purple - Danny Beard and Pixie Polite; On the runway, category is Bing-Oh She Better Don't! Baby, Dakota Schiffer, Le Fil and Sminty Drop receive positive critiques, with Baby and Dakota Schiffer both winning the challenge. Black Peppa, Cheddar Gorgeous, Copper Topp and Jonbers Blonde receive negative critiques, with Cheddar Gorgeous and Jonbers Blonde being safe. Black Peppa and Copper Topp lip-sync to "This Is Real" by Jax Jones ft. Ella Henderson. Black Peppa wins the lip-sync and Copper Topp sashays away.: Guest Judge: Leomie Anderson; Alternating Judge: Alan Carr; Mini-Challenge: Naff-ta Awards; Mini-Challenge Winners: Baby, Black Peppa, Copper Topp, Danny Beard and Sminty Drop; Main Challenge: In pairs, create a look with the same colors and fabrics; Runway Theme: Bing-Oh She Better Don't!; Challenge Winners: Baby and Dakota Schiffer; Bottom Two: Black Peppa and Copper Topp; Lip-Sync Song: "This Is Real" by Jax Jones ft. Ella Henderson; Eliminated: Copper Topp; Farewell Message: Love you all so much! Count your lucky stars you won't be playing me at SNATCH GAME ♥️ Love Old Maiden xxx
32	4	"Catty Man"	13 October 2022
For this week's mini-challenge, the queens play a game of musical chairs. Pixie Polite wins the mini-challenge. For the main challenge, the queens team up and improvise on Alan Carr's show "Catty Man".: Curiosity Killed the Katrina - Cheddar Gorgeous, Danny Beard and Pixie Polite; Kats Got My Tongue - Baby, Dakota Schiffer and Le Fil; The Catfish is Out of the Bag - Black Peppa, Jonbers Blonde and Sminty Drop; On the runway, category is The Mane Event - "Love Your Hair, Hope You Win". Cheddar Gorgeous, Danny Beard and Pixie Polite receive positive critiques, with Danny Beard winning the challenge. Baby, Le Fil and Sminty Drop receive negative critiques, with Le Fil being safe. Baby and Sminty Drop lip-sync to "Respectable" by Mel and Kim. Baby wins the lip-sync and Sminty Drop sashays away.: Guest Judge: Alison Hammond; Alternating Judge: Alan Carr; Mini-Challenge: Play a game of musical chairs; Mini-Challenge Winner: Pixie Polite; Main Challenge: In teams, improvise on Alan Carr's show "Catty Man"; Runway Theme: The Mane Event - "Love Your Hair, Hope You Win"; Challenge Winner: Danny Beard; Bottom Two: Baby and Sminty Drop; Lip-Sync Song: "Respectable" by Mel and Kim; Eliminated: Sminty Drop; Farewell Message: The Manchester Mannequin started panicking, but this is NOT the last runway you'll see me on ♡ Sminty ♡
33	5	"Lairy Poppins: The Rusical"	20 October 2022
For this week's mini-challenge, the queens read each other to filth. Pixie Polite wins the mini-challenge. For the main challenge, the queens perform in Lairy Poppins: The Rusical.: Baby plays Mother; Black Peppa and Dakota Schiffer play Daughter; Cheddar Gorgeous plays Cockroach; Danny Beard plays Lairy Poppins; Jonbers Blonde plays Bird Woman; Le Fil plays Mary Poppins; Pixie Polite plays Chimney Sweep; On the runway, category is West End Wonders. Danny Beard, Jonbers Blonde and Pixie Polite receive positive critiques, with Danny Beard winning the challenge. Baby, Dakota Schiffer and Le Fil receive negative critiques, with Le Fil being safe. Baby and Dakota Schiffer lip-sync to "No Way" by The Cast of Six ft. Renée Lamb. After the lip-sync, Baby announces that she will be leaving the competition, due to mental health issues. Because of this decision, Dakota Schiffer is safe.: Guest Judge: Hannah Waddingham; Alternating Judge: Alan Carr; Mini-Challenge: Reading is Fundamental; Mini-Challenge Winner: Pixie Polite; Main Challenge: Lairy Poppins: The Rusical; Runway Theme: West End Wonders; Challenge Winner: Danny Beard; Bottom Two: Baby and Dakota Schiffer; Lip-Sync Song: "No Way" by The Cast of Six ft. Renée Lamb; Quit: Baby; Farewell Message: Hands up say "Bye Baby" but not for long love you all!!! xoxo
34	6	"Strictly Come Snatch Game"	27 October 2022
For this week's main challenge, the queens play the Snatch Game. AJ Odudu and Tess Daly star as the celebrity contestants. The cast consisted of: Black Peppa as Lil Nas X; Cheddar Gorgeous as Queen Elizabeth I; Dakota Schiffer as Pete Burns; Danny Beard as Cilla Black; Jonbers Blonde as Saint Patty; Le Fil as Marie Kondo; Pixie Polite as Dame Shirley Bassey; On the runway, category is Tickled Pink. Cheddar Gorgous and Jonbers Blonde receive positive critiques, with Cheddar Gorgeous winning the challenge. Black Peppa, Le Fil and Pixie Polite receive negative critiques, with Pixie Polite being safe. Black Peppa and Le Fil lip-sync to "Stop" by Spice Girls. Black Peppa wins the lip-sync and Le Fil sashays away.: Guest Judge: Mel B; Alternating Judge: Alan Carr; Main Challenge: Snatch Game; Runway Theme: Tickled Pink; Challenge Winner: Cheddar Gorgeous; Bottom Two: Black Peppa and Le Fil; Lip-Sync Song: "Stop" by Spice Girls; Eliminated: Le Fil; Farewell Message: Keep whippin' that hair, smash those gender roles! Love, Le Fil-osofical
35	7	"Queen Team Makeovers"	3 November 2022
For this week's main challenge, the queens makeover the Queen Team. On the runway, category is Drag Family Realness. Black Peppa, Cheddar Gorgeous and Danny Beard receive positive critiques, with Cheddar Gorgeous winning the challenge. Dakota Schiffer, Jonbers Blonde and Pixie Polite receive negative critiques, with Jonbers Blonde being safe. Dakota Schiffer and Pixie Polite lip-sync to "Miss Me Blind" by Culture Club. Pixie Polite wins the lip-sync and Dakota Schiffer sashays away.: Guest Judge: Raven and Boy George; Alternating Judge: Graham Norton; Main Challenge: Makeover the Queen Team; Runway Theme: Drag Family Realness; Challenge Winner: Cheddar Gorgeous; Bottom Two: Dakota Schiffer and Pixie Polite; Lip-Sync Song: "Miss Me Blind" by Culture Club; Eliminated: Dakota Schiffer; Farewell Message: The Doll may have left this valley but she certainly left her mark! TRANS RIGHTS!
36	8	"The Squirrel Games"	10 November 2022
For this week's main challenge, the queens overact in the murder mystery movie "The Squirrel Games".: Black Peppa plays Bev Growls; Cheddar Gorgeous plays Minxie; Danny Beard plays Divine-Ah Dickall; Jonbers Blonde plays Sassy and Fugly the Dog; Pixie Polite plays Kimmy Booburn; On the runway, category is Ruff and Ready. Cheddar Gorgeous and Danny Beard receive positive critiques, with Cheddar Gorgeous winning the challenge. Black Peppa and Jonbers Blonde receive negative critiques, and are announced as the bottom two. They lip-sync to "Some Kinda Rush" by Booty Luv. Both queens win the lip-sync and no one goes home.: Guest Judge: Lorraine Pascale; Alternating Judge: Alan Carr; Main Challenge: Overact in the murder mystery movie "The Squirrel Games"; Runway Theme: Ruff and Ready; Challenge Winner: Cheddar Gorgeous; Bottom Two: Black Peppa and Jonbers Blonde; Lip-Sync Song: "Some Kinda Rush" by Booty Luv; Eliminated: None
37	9	"Comedy Queens"	17 November 2022
For this week's main challenge, the queens perform a roast of the judges and the eliminated queens of season 4. On the runway, category is Pretty in Punk. Danny Beard and Jonbers Blonde receive positive critiques, with Danny Beard winning the challenge. Black Peppa, Cheddar Gorgeous and Pixie Polite receive negative critiques, with Cheddar Gorgeous being safe. Black Peppa and Pixie Polite lip-sync to "Another One Bites the Dust" by Queen. Black Peppa wins the lip-sync and Pixie Polite sashays away.: Guest Judge: Olly Alexander; Alternating Judge: Alan Carr; Main Challenge: Perform a roast of the judges and the eliminated queens of Series 4; Runway Theme: Pretty in Punk; Challenge Winner: Danny Beard; Bottom Two: Black Peppa and Pixie Polite; Lip-Sync Song: "Another One Bites the Dust" by Queen; Eliminated: Pixie Polite; Farewell Message: You're a fabulous top 4 ♡ BUT #pixiewozrobbed! Very Rude!
38	10	"Grand Finale"	24 November 2022
For the final challenge of the season, the queens write, record and perform their own verse in a megamix of RuPaul songs. On the runway, category is Grand Finale Eleganza. The eliminated queens all return to the runway. Black Peppa and Jonbers Blonde are eliminated, leaving Cheddar Gorgeous and Danny Beard as the top two queens of the season. They lip-sync to "This Is My Life" by Shirley Bassey. It is announced that Danny Beard is the winner, leaving Cheddar Gorgeous as the runner-up.: Alternating Judges: Alan Carr and Graham Norton; Main Challenge: Write, record and perform your own verse in a megamix of RuPaul songs; Runway Theme: Grand Finale Eleganza; Eliminated: Black Peppa and Jonbers Blonde; Final Two: Cheddar Gorgeous and Danny Beard; Lip-Sync Song: "This Is My Life" by Shirley Bassey; Runner-up: Cheddar Gorgeous; Winner of RuPaul's Drag Race UK Series Four: Danny Beard
