= Ginger Johnson (drag queen) =

British drag performer

- Born: Donald Marshall; 1988 or 1989 (age 37–38); Lanchester, County Durham, England
- Occupation: Drag queen
- Television: RuPaul's Drag Race UK (series 5); Celebrity MasterChef (series 20)
- Website: gingerjohnson.co.uk

Ginger Johnson is the stage name of Donald Marshall, an English drag queen, who won the fifth series of RuPaul's Drag Race UK and the twentieth series of Celebrity MasterChef.

== Drag career ==
Marshall began performing in drag at university in the late 2000s. As part of his degree, he wrote a radio play about a woman with whom he had grown up. Without the budget to pay an actress to record it, Marshall "put on a voice and did it myself". He would soon perform the character for live audiences. Marshall also created a child star character called Little Jimmy Johnson, who he described as "a little s**t who's nine-and-three-quarter years old."

Early in his drag career Marshall made costumes for the performance artist Scottee. When someone dropped out of one of Scottee's pageants, Marshall stepped in. Scottee was "so impressed with my clothes that they said they would pay me £100 a week to make outfits. Three days later, I packed up and moved to London."

Marshall's drag alter ego Ginger Johnson was inspired by the "amazing, fiery redheaded women from the Golden Age of Hollywood", including Lucille Ball, Rita Hayworth, Carol Channing and Kay Thompson. As the character has evolved, Marshall thinks of Johnson as a "time traveller" saying "she's this character that can exist anywhere that I dare drop her." Other influences include David Hoyle, Dina Martina and Danny La Rue plus Drag Race alumni Jinkx Monsoon, BenDeLaCreme and Tammie Brown. In 2014 Johnson joined the "defunct but game-changing" queer nightlife collective Sink the Pink for which she wrote, directed and co-produced six "surreal spins" on panto including: Down the Rabbit Hole, The Queen's Head (for Selfridges), How to Catch a Krampus and Escape from Planet Trash. Johnson also performs at and hosts various club events. Johnson appeared at the UKs first ever drag karaoke bar, The Karaoke Hole in Dalston, London which opened in May 2018. Johnson is a London Associate Artist of the Pleasance Islington, London. In 2020, Johnson co-presented the online breakfast show Wakey! alongside Love Island contestant Chris Taylor. Johnson has written children's stories, including Glamourous Gran and Other Tall Stories which she has performed at the Southbank Centre. Johnson has also created a puppet video series.

In 2023, Ginger Johnson won the fifth series of RuPaul's Drag Race UK. She has described herself as "a helium balloon in the shape of a woman" and her drag as "silly" and "camp". During her time on the show, she impersonated Barbara Cartland for the Snatch Game challenge. In preparation for the show, she prepared "roast" jokes in advance for all the queens on the "rumour lists" which circulated before filming started. As at December 2023, Johnson is one of only a few queens who have won three challenges in a row in any of the Drag Race franchises, alongside Lawrence Chaney, Chad Michaels, Envy Peru and Manila Luzon. In December 2025, Johnson won the twentieth series of Celebrity MasterChef.

== Personal life ==
Marshall was born in Lanchester, County Durham. He attended a Catholic secondary school and studied scriptwriting at university in Newcastle. As a child, Marshall wanted to be a pantomime dame, considering Chris Hayward of the Theatre Royal, Newcastle one of the "all-time greats". Marshall's first memory of making people laugh as a child was doing "magic shows in my local library".

Marshall played for the Newcastle Falcons rugby team. In 2017 he said, "I often joke that being a drag queen and being a rugby player are very similar: they involve a lot of physical pain, and it’s quite aggressive." The flat where Marshall lives with his partner featured in an IKEA article, with design by Ashlyn Gibson.

== Shows ==
| Year | Show | Venue |
|---|---|---|
| 2014 | Some Mothers | |
| 2014-2018 | Little Jimmy Johnson | Various |
| 2015 | Suddenly, Last Summer | The Glory |
| 2016-2018 | Awful | |
| 2016 | Down the Rabbit Hole | Selfridges, London |
| 2017 | The Queen’s Head | Selfridges, London |
| 2018 | How to Catch a Krampus | Pleasance Theatre, London |
| 2019 | Ginger Johnson's Happy Place | Edinburgh Festival |
| 2019 | Escape from Planet Trash | Pleasance Theatre, London |
| 2020 | Ginger Johnson's Christmas Egg | Pleasance Theatre, London |
| 2021 | Dog Show | Pleasance Theatre, London |
| 2021 | Ginger Johnson and Pals | Pleasance Theatre, London |
| 2022 | Good Clean Fun | Pleasance Theatre, London |
| 2022 | The Ginger and Jonbers Show | The Glory, London |
| 2022 | Ginger Johnson’s Festive Spread | Pleasance Theatre, London |
| 2023 | David Hoyle and Ginger Johnson | Hebden Bridge |
| 2023 | Ginger All The Way! | Soho Theatre, London |
| 2024 | Angels of the North | Newcastle, London, Liverpool and Birmingham |

== Discography ==
=== Featured singles ===
| Title | Year | Album |
|---|---|---|
| Don't Ick My Yum (The M-52s Version) (RuPaul featuring Banksie, Kate Butch, & Miss Naomi Carter) | 2023 | non-album single |
| Pant-Oh She Better Don't: The Rusical | 2023 | Pant-Oh She Better Don't: The Rusical Album |

== Filmography ==
=== Television ===
| Year | Title | Role | Notes |
|---|---|---|---|
| 2023 | RuPaul's Drag Race UK | Winner (Series 5) | |
| 2023 | Lorraine | Guest | |
| 2024 | Bring Back My Girls | Guest | |
| 2024 | Ginger's House | Main role | |
| 2025 | Celebrity MasterChef | Contestant; winner | |

Awards and achievements
| Preceded by Danny Beard | Winner of RuPaul's Drag Race UK; Series 5 (2023) | Succeeded by Kyran Thrax |
