= The After Shave with Danny Beard =

- Presented by: Danny Beard
- Starring: Bailey J Mills
- Country of origin: United Kingdom
- Original language: English
- No. of seasons: 1
- No. of episodes: 9

Production
- Executive producers: Fenton Bailey; Randy Barbato; Tom Campbell; Breonna Carrera; Ruby Kiraishe
- Running time: 15 minutes
- Production company: World of Wonder

Original release
- Release: 28 September – 23 November 2023

The After Shave with Danny Beard is a 2023 television series hosted by British drag performer Danny Beard. It has been described as a "sister show" to RuPaul's Drag Race UK. It is aired on BBC Three in the United Kingdom and on WOW Presents Plus internationally.

== Format ==
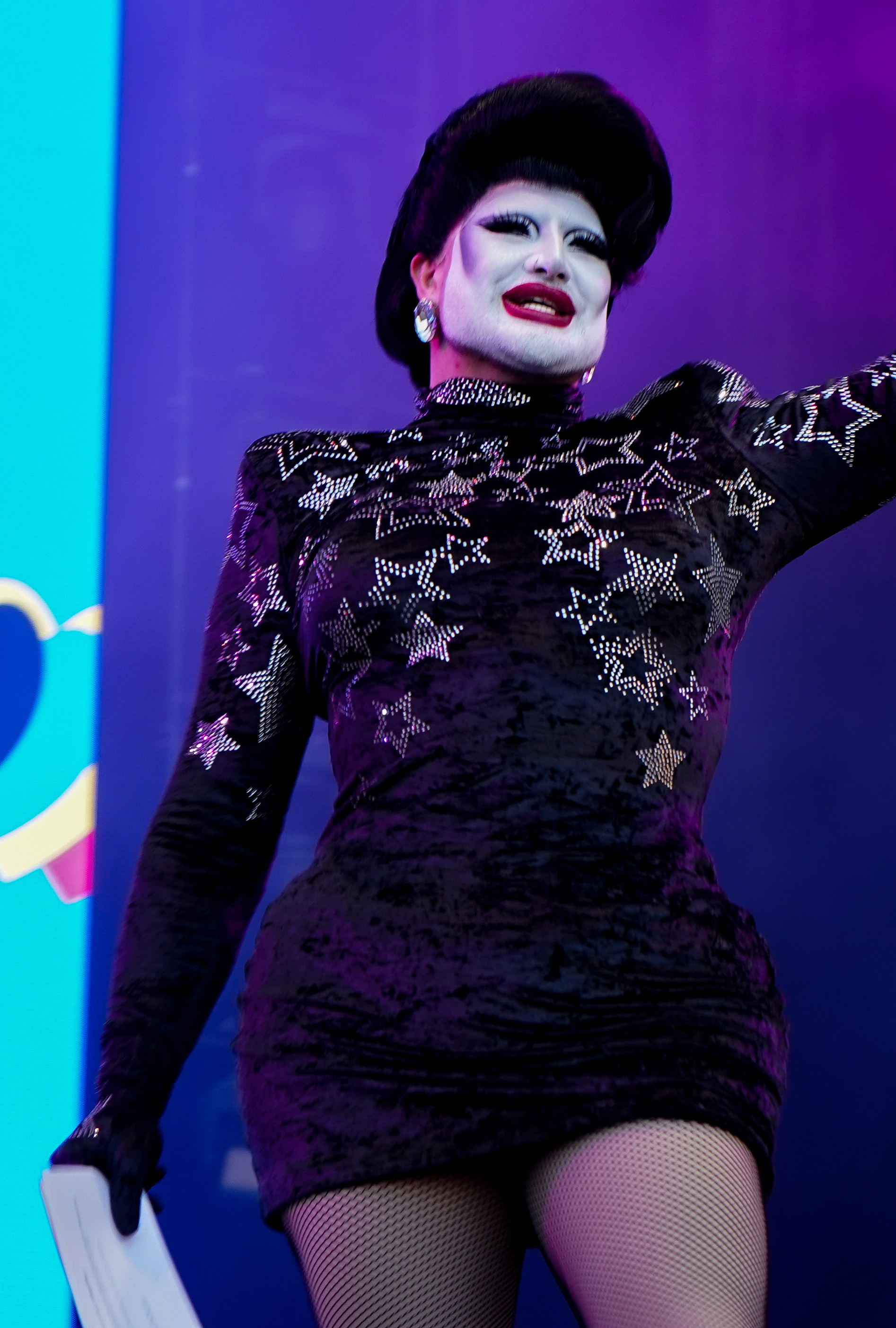
Danny Beard in 2023

The show is set in a barbershop, with the opening sequence showing Danny Beard acting as a hairstylist. The host appears out of drag in segments filmed in the barbershop and in drag on the set of RuPaul's Drag Race UK. Danny Beard described their presenting style as possessing "the chaos of Allison[sic] Hammond, the gritty titties of Stacey Dooley and campness of Alan Carr".

Each episode features an on-set interview with the contestant who was eliminated that week on RuPaul's Drag Race UK series five. On occasions where there is no elimination, an alumnus of the show appears instead to offer commentary on the episode. Danny Beard's interview with Cara Melle in the seventh episode was filmed backstage at the Royal Albert Hall due to Cara Melle being unavailable after her elimination because of ill health.

English drag performer Bailey J Mills appears alongside Danny Beard every week in the supporting role of 'The After Shave Shop Assistant', participating in comedic skits and offering unique hair tutorials to guests.

== Production ==
Most of the interview segments were filmed on the set of RuPaul's Drag Race UK in the "werkroom". The series was announced on the show's social media accounts on 12 September 2023.

It was confirmed in March 2024 that since The After Shave was technically part of Danny Beard's prize for winning the fourth series of RuPaul's Drag Race UK, it could not be recommissioned for the sixth series of the show. Danny Beard stated that the reason for the cancellation was not viewing figures, which were, according to the host, "amazing" and "the best figures for any [Drag Race UK] winner’s show, ever". They stated that the show was "fully" their idea and have expressed interest in returning to it at another point: "It would be great if it could even be like a Big Brother: Late & Live, where [an] audience can get involved… and this isn’t to say it won’t come back in some form in the future – everyone’s still very excited by it, but unfortunately because of the way it was a prize and commissioning [works], means it won’t be back for season six."
