= DeDeLicious =

British drag performer

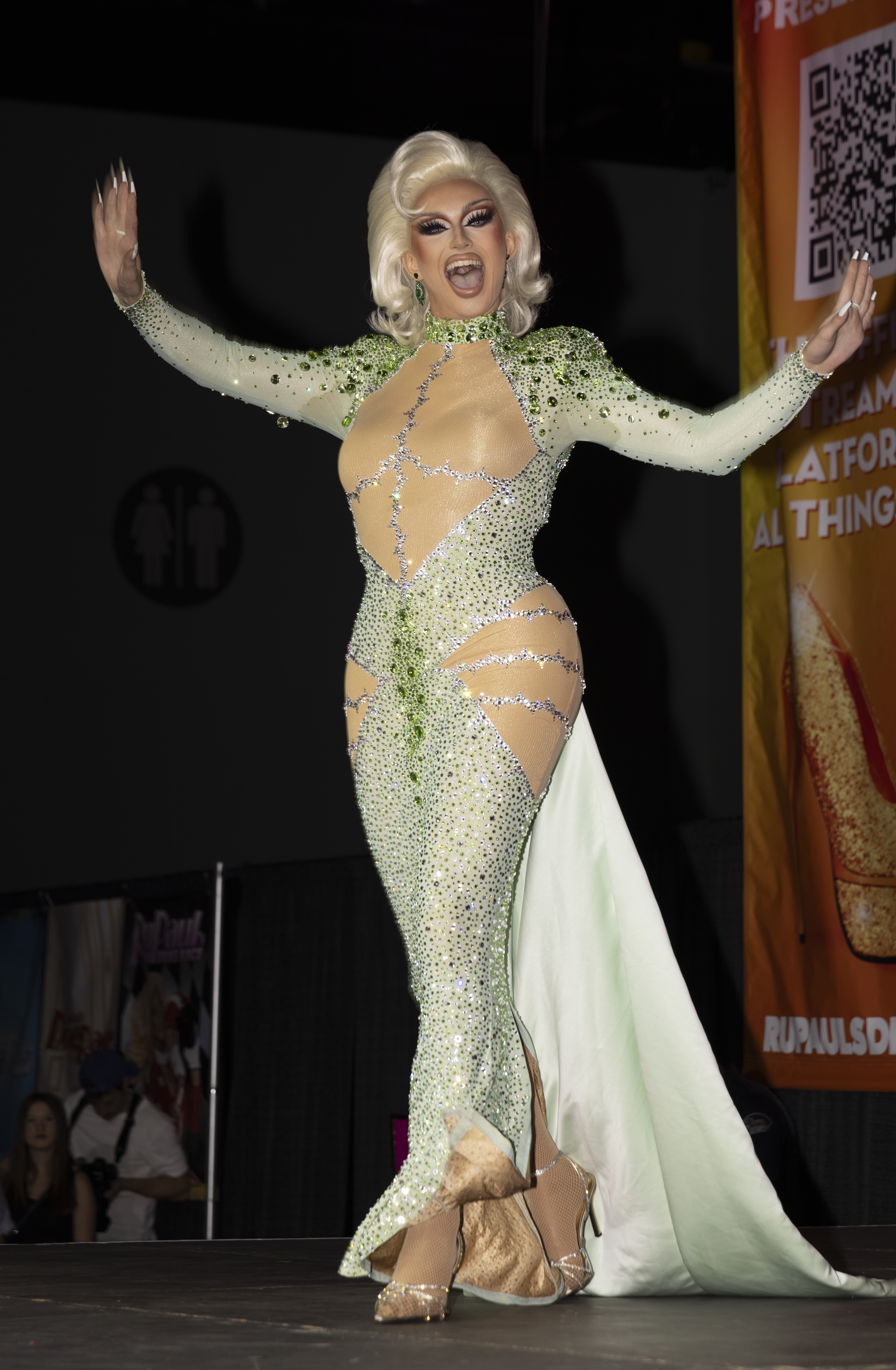
- DeDeLicious at RuPaul's DragCon LA, 2024
- Born: Charlie Veysey-Smith; 2002 or 2003 (age 22–23); Tunbridge Wells, Kent, England
- Occupation: Drag queen
- Television: RuPaul's Drag Race UK (series 5)

DeDeLicious is the stage name of Charlie Veysey-Smith, a British drag performer who has appeared on the BBC reality series Keeping Up with Krystal Versace and competed on series 5 of RuPaul's Drag Race UK.

== Career ==
DeDeLicious is a drag queen competing on series 5 of RuPaul's Drag Race UK. She designed some of the outfits worn on the show by Krystal Versace, the winner of series 3, and other contestants. Previously, DeDeLicious was part of Krystal Versace's "drag family" in the BBC reality series Keeping Up with Krystal Versace. During her time on Drag Race, DeDeLicious impersonated Lady Colin Campbell for the Snatch Game challenge. She placed fourth overall in the competition.

== Personal life ==
DeDeLicious is from Tunbridge Wells, Kent. She and Krystal Versace have been described as best friends and "drag sisters". DeDeLicious uses the pronouns he/him out of drag and she/her in drag. Sam Damshenas of Gay Times has described her as a "sewing crackerjack" and a Nicki Minaj "stan".

== Discography ==
=== Featured singles ===
Title	Year	Album
"Don't Ick My Yum (Fierce Force Five Version)" (RuPaul featuring Tomara Thomas, Vicki Vivacious, Michael Marouli, & Cara Melle)	2023	non-album single
"Pant-Oh She Better Don't: The Rusical"	2023	Pant-Oh She Better Don't: The Rusical Album

== Filmography ==
=== Television ===
Year	Title	Role	Notes	Ref
2023	Keeping Up with Krystal Versace	Herself	Guest cast	
2023	RuPaul's Drag Race UK	Herself	Contestant	

- Bring Back My Girls
