= Lydia B Kollins =

American drag performer (born 2001)

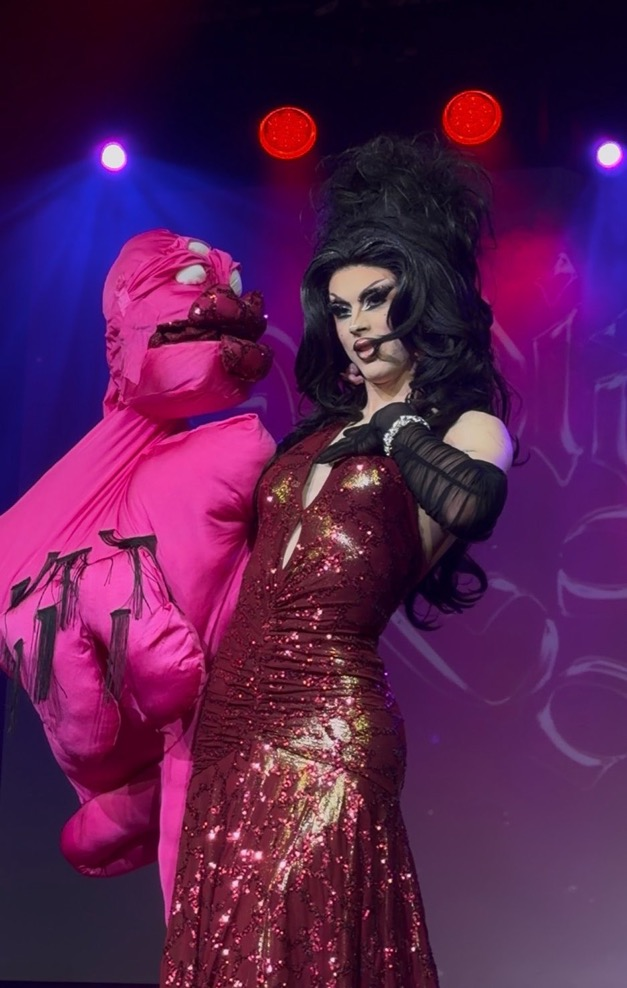
- Lydia B Kollins in April 2026
- Born: Nicholas James Fry; May 29, 2001 (age 25)
- Other name: Lydia Butthole Kollins
- Occupation: Drag performer
- Years active: 2016-present
- Television: RuPaul's Drag Race (season 17); RuPaul's Drag Race All Stars (season 10)
- Partner: Kori King (2024–present)

Nicholas James Fry (born May 29, 2001), known professionally as Lydia B Kollins, is an American drag performer, filmmaker, and model who competed on the seventeenth season of RuPaul's Drag Race, where she finished in 7th place. Lydia B Kollins competed on the tenth season (2025) of RuPaul's Drag Race All Stars, where she ended up tying for 3rd place with fellow contestant Bosco.

== Early life and education ==
Fry was raised in Greensburg, Pennsylvania, attending Hempfield Area School District and graduating in 2019. They attended Point Park University for film and graduated in 2023.

== Career ==
Fry's drag persona Lydia B Kollins is derived from the Beetlejuice character Lydia Deetz. Lydia B Kollins is a filmmaker, as she said in her season of RuPaul's Drag Race, and cites Tim Burton, David Lynch, and John Waters as inspirations. She started drag in the online drag community at the age of 15, competing on the web series Drag Showdown, as well as winning the third season of The Drag Ball web series. Her first time performing in public was for a Pride event at Nemacolin Woodlands Resort in 2021. Prior to performing in drag full-time, she worked as a server at the Duquesne Club in Pittsburgh. She auditioned only once for Drag Race. As a model, she walked for Susanne Bartsch’s "Bartsch Summer Camp Pride" event in 2021. Kollins opened for singer Chappell Roan's Pittsburgh show as a part of The Midwest Princess Tour in April 2024. Her "home bars" are P*Town Bar in Oakland and Blue Moon in Lawrenceville, Pittsburgh. Kollins describes her drag as "grungy", "alternative", "eerie", and "vampy". Her Instagram following grew by 1,283 percent as the show aired.

Kollins is the only Drag Race contestant to compete on a second season (All Stars 10) before their first has aired, sharing that she was invited to participate again 3 weeks after filming of Drag Race Season 17 finished, and that she had about 5 days to prepare for Drag Race All Stars 10. Kollins is also the only contestant to simultaneously compete in 2 seasons. She competed in season 17's 'Lipsync LaLaPaRuZa Smackdown' while on a production break from All Stars 10, where she was to progress to the semifinals and later returned to complete filming.

== Personal life ==
Fry is based in Pittsburgh. As of 2025, Fry is dating fellow Drag Race contestant Kori King.

== Filmography ==
=== Television ===
Year	Title	Role	Notes
2025	RuPaul's Drag Race (season 17)	Contestant	7th place
2025	RuPaul's Drag Race: Untucked (season 16)	Herself	
2025	RuPaul's Drag Race All Stars (season 10)	Contestant	3rd place

=== Web series ===
- Flammable Drag Race 1 (2017) | Contestant
- Drag Showdown 3 (2018) | Contestant
- The Drag Ball 2 (2019) | Contestant
- The Drag Ball 3 (2020) | Winner
- DSDivas (2021) | Contestant
- The Drag Ball 5 (2023) | Judge
- Whatcha Packin' (2025), hosted by Michelle Visage, World of Wonder

== See also ==
- List of people from Pittsburgh
