= Cara Melle =

American drag performer

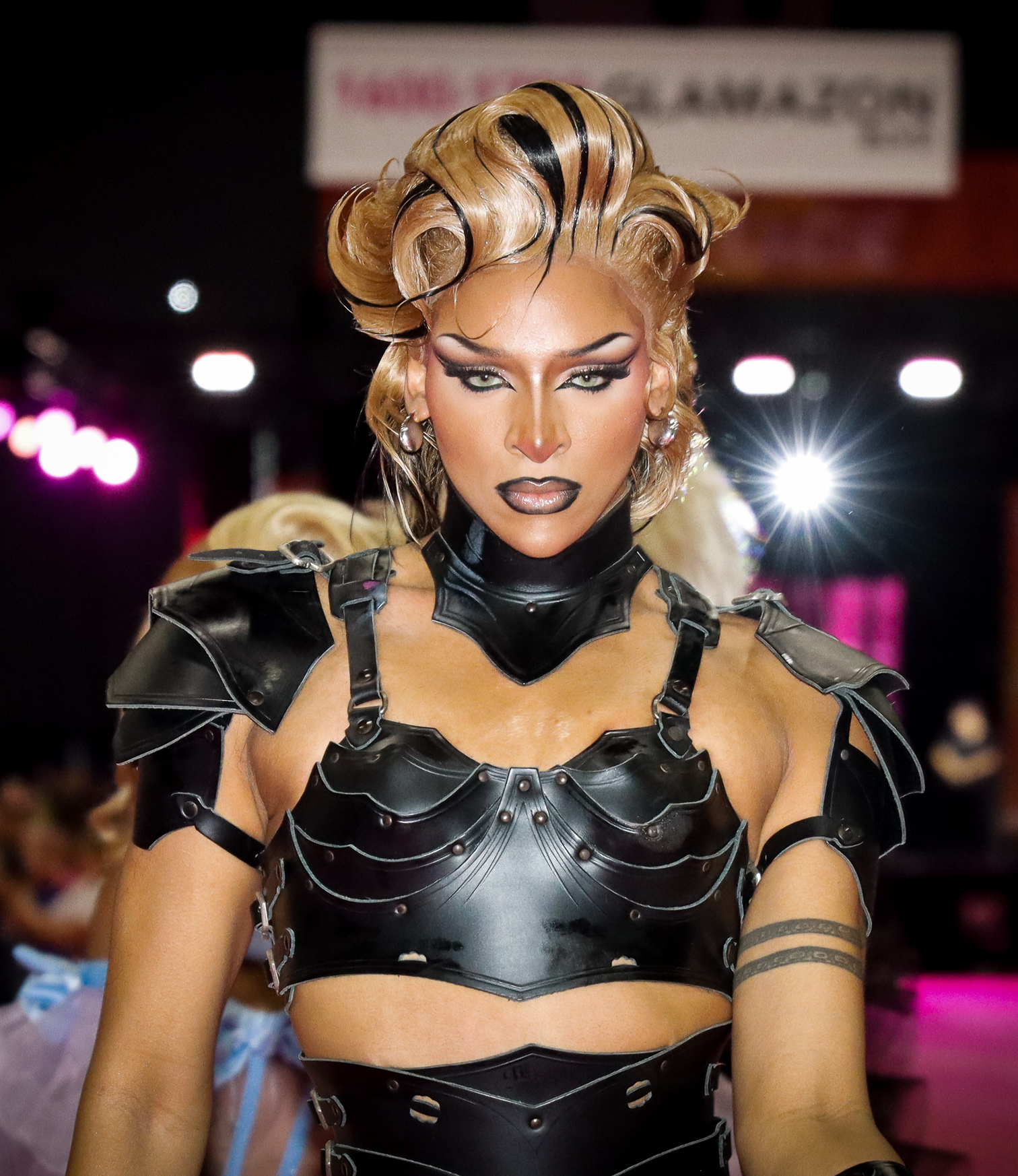
- Cara Melle at RuPaul's DragCon LA, 2024
- Born: 1996 or 1997 (age 28–29); Atlanta, Georgia, U.S
- Other name: Sterling Theodora Butler
- Occupation: Drag queen
- Television: Karaoke Club: Drag Edition; RuPaul's Drag Race UK (series 5)

Cara Melle is the stage name of Sterling Theodora Butler, an American drag performer. Since moving to London, England, she has appeared on the ITV reality series Karaoke Club: Drag Edition and competed on series 5 of RuPaul's Drag Race UK, placing 6th.

== Early life ==
Cara Melle was born in Atlanta, Georgia, but moved to London after finishing university to pursue her career in drag.

== Career ==
In 2021, Cara Melle was a contestant on the ITV2 reality series Karaoke Club: Drag Edition. She entered the club on the first day, however was forced to withdraw from the competition due to illness prior to the fifth episode. In 2023, Cara Melle was announced was one of the contestants competing in series 5 of RuPaul's Drag Race UK. She impersonated Dionne Warwick for the Snatch Game challenge.

In 2024 Cara Melle starred as Olive Wood in the Tubi horror comedy film Slay, alongside fellow Drag Race alumni Crystal Methyd, Heidi N Closet and Trinity the Tuck.

== Personal life ==
Cara Melle is a trans woman and uses she/her pronouns.

== Discography ==
=== Featured singles ===
Title	Year	Album
"Don't Ick My Yum (Fierce Force Five Version)" (RuPaul featuring Tomara Thomas, Vicki Vivacious, Michael Marouli, & DeDeLicious)	2023	non-album single
"Pant-Oh She Better Don't: The Rusical"	2023	Pant-Oh She Better Don't: The Rusical Album

== Filmography ==
=== Television ===
Year	Title	Role	Notes	Ref
2021	Rob & Romesh Vs	Herself	Guest; Series 3, episode 3	
2021	Karaoke Club: Drag Edition	Herself	Contestant (8th place)	
2023	RuPaul's Drag Race UK	Herself	Contestant (6th place)	
2024	Slay	Olive Wood	Tubi original film	

- Bring Back My Girls
