= Danny Beard =

British drag performer (born 1992)

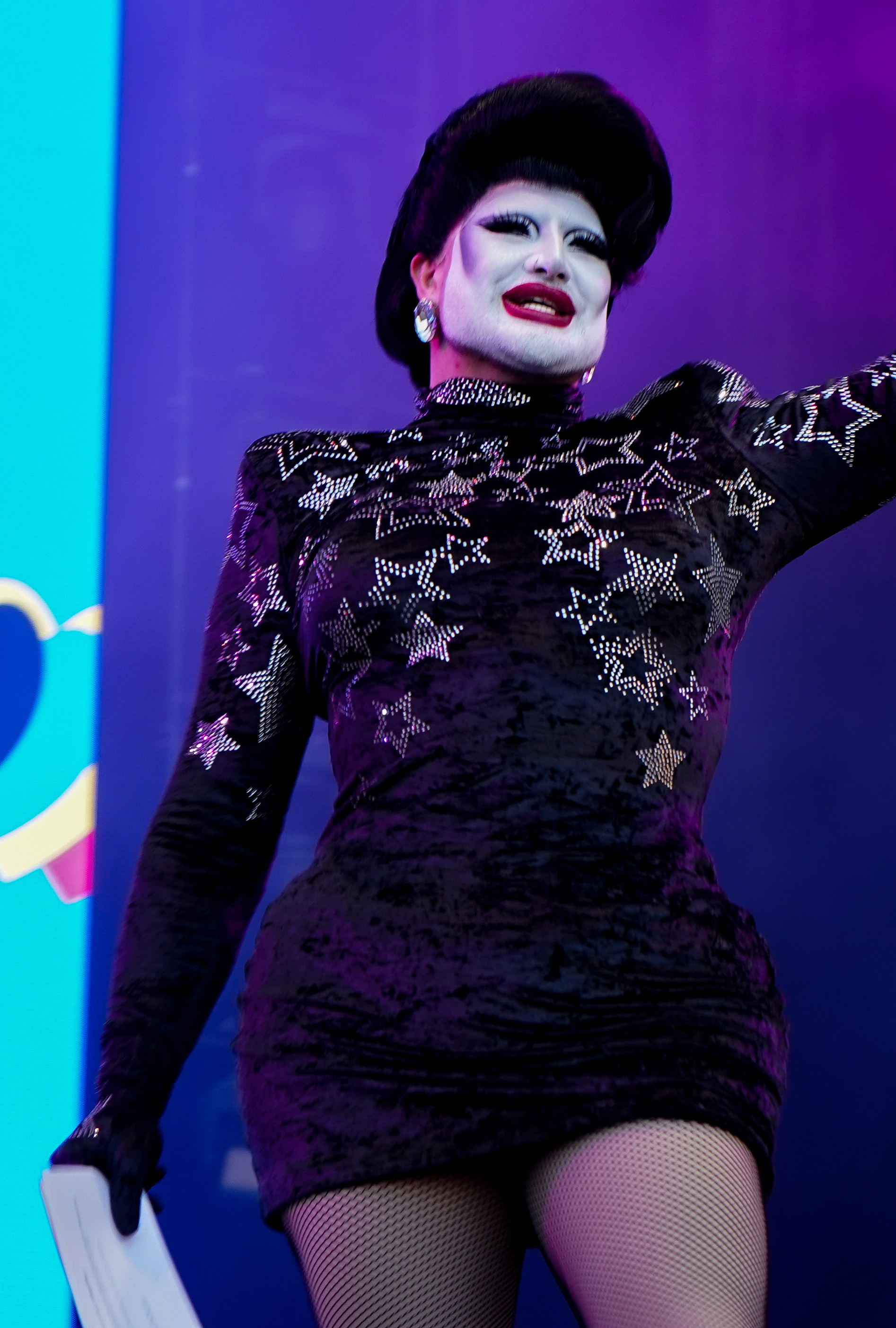
- Danny Beard in 2023
- Born: Daniel Curtis; 27 May 1992 (age 34); Bebington, Merseyside, England
- Occupations: Drag queen; singer; television personality
- Years active: 2016–present
- Television: See here

Daniel Curtis (born 27 May 1992), known professionally as Danny Beard, is a British drag performer and singer, who appeared on Britain's Got Talent and Karaoke Club: Drag Edition and won the fourth series of RuPaul's Drag Race UK.

== Career ==
In 2016, Danny Beard auditioned for the tenth series of Britain's Got Talent and reached the semi-finals. In 2021, they were a contestant on Karaoke Club: Drag Edition and finished in fourth place.

In 2022, Beard was announced as part of the cast of Series 4 of RuPaul's Drag Race UK, becoming the sixth bearded queen in the Drag Race franchise and the first to appear on one judged by RuPaul. During their run, they won four main challenges, becoming the fourth contestant in the history of RuPaul's Drag Race UK to do so, and made it to the finale without ever being up for elimination. On 24 November 2022, Beard was announced as the winner of the season, becoming the first bearded winner of any Drag Race franchise.

In March 2023, Beard appeared in the Channel 4 soap opera, Hollyoaks. In January 2024, Beard appeared as a guest on BBC iPlayer / BBC Sounds The Traitors: Uncloaked.

On 8 March 2024, he joined BBC Radio 1 temporarily to present their own mid-morning show on each Friday and Saturday until July, replacing Katie Thistleton who went on to co-host Going Home with Vick Hope and Jamie Laing.

On 7 April 2025, Beard entered the Celebrity Big Brother house as a housemate on the 24th series finishing second.

On 1 September 2025, it was announced that Beard would appear in the 2025/26 Pantomime Season, playing Carabosse in Sleeping Beauty at the Grand Theatre, Wolverhampton.

For his performance as Carabosse in Sleeping Beauty at the Grand Theatre, Wolverhampton, Beard was nominated as 'Best Villain' in the UK Pantomime Association, Pantomime Awards 2026. The production was also nominated for two further awards, 'Best Script' and 'Best Pantomime (over 900 seats)'. Although Beard did not win his award the production went on to win 'Best Pantomime (over 900 seats)'.

In February 2027, Beard will play Paul O'Grady/Lily Savage in a new play Savage by Jonathan Harvey based on O'Grady's life at the Curve, Leicester prior to a UK tour and West End run.

== Filmography ==
Year	Title	Role	Notes	Ref.
2016	Britain's Got Talent (Series 10)	Contestant		
2021	Karaoke Club: Drag Edition	Contestant		
2022	RuPaul's Drag Race UK (Series 4)	Contestant	Winner (10 episodes)	
2023	Eurovision Song Contest 2023: Allocation Draw	Themself	Cameo	
2023	Hollyoaks	Themself	Cameo	
2023	The After Shave with Danny Beard	Host		
2024	Bring Back My Girls	Themself	1 episode	
2025	Celebrity Big Brother (Series 24)	Housemate	Runner up	

- Touch-Ups with Raven (2025)
- Dear Viv (2025)

== Discography ==
List of singles
Title	Year	Album
"Gypsy Woman (She's Homeless)" (with WERK)	2022	Non-album singles

List of featured singles
Title	Year	Album
"Fabulous" (Bold Queens and Wolfellino feat. Danny Beard)	2018	Music for Clown Parties
"Come Alive" (Queens of the Bone Age version) (with the cast of RuPaul's Drag Race UK, series 4)	2022	Non-album singles
"Lairy Poppins: The Rusical" (with the cast RuPaul's Drag Race UK, series 4)	2022	Non-album singles
"UK Grand Finale Megamix" (RuPaul featuring the cast RuPaul's Drag Race UK, series 4)	2022	Non-album singles

Awards and achievements
Preceded by Krystal Versace	Winner of RuPaul's Drag Race UK; Series 4 (2022)	Succeeded by Ginger Johnson
