= RuPaul's Drag Race: UK vs. the World series 3 =

2026 series of RuPaul's Drag Race: UK vs. the World

RuPaul's Drag Race: UK vs. the World
- Series 3
- Promotional poster for Series 3
- Hosted by: RuPaul
- Judges: RuPaul; Michelle Visage; Alan Carr; Graham Norton
- No. of contestants: 10
- Winner: Gawdland
- Runner-up: Kate Butch
- Miss Congeniality: Serena Morena
- No. of episodes: 8

Release
- Original network: BBC Three / BBC iPlayer (UK); WOW Presents Plus (International)
- Original release: 27 January – 17 March 2026

Series chronology
- ← Previous; Series 2

The third series of RuPaul's Drag Race: UK vs. the World began airing on 27 January 2026. RuPaul returned to his role of main host and head judge, and again was joined by Michelle Visage, Alan Carr, and Graham Norton, all of whom are judges on RuPaul's Drag Race UK.

== Production ==
In December 2025, the BBC announced that RuPaul's Drag Race: UK vs. the World would return for a third series.

== Contestants ==
RuPaul's Drag Race: UK vs. the World series 3 contestants and their backgrounds (Note: All ages, names, with hometowns, and outcome are stated at time of filming.)
Contestant	Age	Hometown	Original season(s)	Original placement(s)	Outcome
Gawdland	23	Chiang Mai, Thailand	Thailand season 3	3rd place	Winner
Kate Butch	29	Buxton, United Kingdom	UK series 5	5th place	Runner-up
Fontana	32	Stockholm, Sweden	Sverige season 1	Runner-up	3rd place
Mariah Balenciaga (Note: Mariah Balenciaga was referred to as Mariah on US season 3, and Mariah Paris Balenciaga on US All Stars 5)	43	Los Angeles, United States	US season 3	9th place	3rd place
Mariah Balenciaga	43	Los Angeles, United States	All Stars 5	8th place	3rd place
The Only Naomy	25	Cologne, Germany	Germany season 1	10th place	5th place
Zahirah Zapanta	29	Nottingham, United Kingdom	UK series 6	10th place	6th place
Serena Morena	37	Aguascalientes, Mexico	México season 1	8th place	7th place (Note: Serena Morena was voted Miss Congeniality.)
Sminty Drop	26	Clitheroe, United Kingdom	UK series 4	9th place	8th place
Minty Fresh	35	Quezon City, Philippines	Philippines season 1	5th place	9th place
Melinda Verga	47	Edmonton, Canada	Canada season 4	5th place	10th place

== Contestant progress ==
Legend:

Gawdland won RuPaul's Drag Race: UK vs. the World series 3.
Kate Butch was the runner-up.
Serena Morena was voted Miss Congeniality (Miss C) by fellow contestants.
WIN indicates that the contestant won the challenge.
TOP2 indicates that the contestant was one of the best performing in the challenge, but lost the Lip Sync for the Win.
SAFE indicates that the contestant was declared safe by the judges.
CT (Chippy Tea) indicates that the contestant received the Chippy Tea and was saved from the bottom two.
BTM (Bottom) indicates that the contestant was up for elimination.
ELIM (Eliminated) indicates that the contestant was eliminated.
Guest indicates that the contestant returned as a guest.

Contestants progress with placements in each episode
Contestant	Episode							
Contestant	1	2	3	4	5	6	7	8
Gawdland	TOP2	WIN	WIN	SAFE	SAFE	SAFE	SAFE	Winner
Kate Butch	SAFE	SAFE	SAFE	WIN	SAFE	WIN	BTM	Runner-up
Fontana	WIN	SAFE	BTM	SAFE	BTM	SAFE	SAFE	Eliminated
Mariah Balenciaga	SAFE	SAFE	SAFE	CT	WIN	BTM	WIN	Eliminated
The Only Naomy	SAFE	BTM	SAFE	SAFE	SAFE	SAFE	ELIM	Guest
Zahirah Zapanta	SAFE	SAFE	SAFE	SAFE	CT	ELIM		Guest
Serena Morena	SAFE	SAFE	CT	BTM	ELIM			Miss C
Sminty Drop	SAFE	SAFE	SAFE	ELIM				Guest
Minty Fresh	SAFE	CT	ELIM					Guest
Melinda Verga	SAFE	ELIM						Guest

== Lip syncs ==
Legend:

The contestant won the lip sync to win the challenge.
The contestant was eliminated after their first time in the bottom.
The contestant was eliminated after their second time in the bottom.
The contestant won the first round of the Lip Sync Smackdown for the Crown and advanced to the second.
The contestant won the second round of the Lip Sync Smackdown for the Crown and was declared the winner of the season.

Episode	Top contestants			Song	Winner
1	Fontana	vs.	Gawdland	"Tattoo" (Loreen)	Fontana
Episode	Bottom contestants			Song	Eliminated
2	Melinda Verga	vs.	The Only Naomy	"I Begin to Wonder" (Dannii Minogue)	Melinda Verga
3	Fontana	vs.	Minty Fresh	"Angel of My Dreams" (Jade)	Minty Fresh
4	Serena Morena	vs.	Sminty Drop	"I Heard a Rumour" (Bananarama)	Sminty Drop
5	Fontana	vs.	Serena Morena	"Axel F" (Crazy Frog)	Serena Morena
6	Mariah Balenciaga	vs.	Zahirah Zapanta	"Rasputin" (Boney M.)	Zahirah Zapanta
7	Kate Butch	vs.	The Only Naomy	"Left Outside Alone" (Anastacia)	The Only Naomy
Episode	Finalists			Song	Winner
8	Gawdland	vs.	Mariah Balenciaga	"Broken Heels" (Alexandra Burke)	Gawdland
8	Fontana	vs.	Kate Butch	"Ride on Time" (Black Box)	Kate Butch
8	Gawdland	vs.	Kate Butch	"What Do I Have to Do" (Kylie Minogue)	Gawdland

== Chippy Tea ==
Legend:

The contestant won the Maxi Challenge and possessed the Chippy Tea to save one of the bottom queens.
The contestant received the Chippy Tea and was saved from the bottom.

Episode	Chippy Tea Gifter	Bottom Queens	Saved
2	Gawdland	Melinda Verga, Minty Fresh and The Only Naomy	Minty Fresh
3	Gawdland	Fontana, Minty Fresh and Serena Morena	Serena Morena
4	Kate Butch	Mariah Balenciaga, Serena Morena and Sminty Drop	Mariah Balenciaga
5	Mariah Balenciaga	Fontana, Serena Morena and Zahirah Zapanta	Zahirah Zapanta

== Guest judges ==
Listed in chronological order:

- Loreen, Swedish singer and two-time Eurovision Song Contest winner
- Kristen McMenamy, American model
- Jade Thirlwall, English singer
- Sara Dallin, English singer-songwriter and member of Bananarama
- Keren Woodward, English singer-songwriter and member of Bananarama
- Will Poulter, English actor
- Lucy Punch, English actress
- Anastacia, American singer-songwriter

=== Special guests ===
Guests who appeared in episodes, but did not judge on the main stage.

Episode 3

- Ashley Roberts, American singer, dancer, and television personality
- Kimberly Wyatt, American singer, dancer, and television personality
- Raven, runner-up of both RuPaul's Drag Race Season 2 and All Stars 1

Episode 4

- Rag'n'Bone Man, English singer

Episode 5

- Russell T Davies, Welsh screenwriter and television producer

Episode 6

- Jayde Adams, English comedian and actress

Episode 7

- Daniel Jervis, British Olympic swimmer
- Celia Quansah, British Olympic rugby sevens player
- Shanaze Reade, British Olympic BMX racer and track cyclist
- Greg Rutherford, British Olympic track and field athlete
- Molly Thompson-Smith, British Olympic rock climber

Episode 8

- Tia Kofi, contestant on RuPaul's Drag Race UK Series 2 and winner of RuPaul's Drag Race: UK vs. the World Series 2

== Episodes ==
No. overall	No. in series	Title	Original release date
15	1	"RuRuvision Song Contest"	27 January 2026
Ten queens from across the Drag Race franchise enter the competition. RuPaul informs them that for the main challenge, the queens must perform an original song in a talent show in front of the judges.: Fontana - "Whatchyu Waitin' For"; Gawdland - "Firecracker"; Kate Butch - "This Time on This Occasion"; Mariah Balenciaga - "Fire and Passion"; Melinda Verga - "Will We Ever"; Minty Fresh - "Planet Fresh"; Serena Morena - "Electricity"; Sminty Drop - "Swerk"; The Only Naomy - "Blonde, Pretty, Basic"; Zahirah Zapanta - "Sissy CD"; On the runway, category is "For Queen and Country". Fontana, Gawdland, Kate Butch, Sminty Drop, and The Only Naomy receive positive critiques. It is announced that Fontana and Gawdland are the top two queens of the week and will lip-sync for the win. They lip-sync to "Tattoo" by Loreen. After the lip sync, Fontana is announced as the winner of the challenge. RuPaul then announces that no one is going home.: Guest Judge: Loreen; Alternating Judge: Graham Norton; Main Challenge: Perform an original song at the RuRuvision Song Contest; Runway Theme: For Queen and Country; Challenge Winners: Fontana and Gawdland; Lip-Sync Song: "Tattoo" by Loreen; Lip-Sync for The World Winner: Fontana; Eliminated: None
16	2	"Runway Ru-Mix"	3 February 2026
For this week main challenge, the queens present two looks on the runway: "RuDemption" and "The RuMix", with the latter made in the work room using another queen's outfit from a previous season.: Fontana - Kate Butch's Night of A Thousand Pop Icons look (UK series 5, Episode 3); Gawdland - Fontana's Långstrump Extravaganza look (Sverige season 1, Episode 2); Kate Butch - Zahirah Zapanta's New Romantics look (UK series 6, Episode 3); Mariah Balenciaga - Melinda Verga's Always a Bridesmaid look (Canada season 4, Episode 7); Melinda Verga - The Only Naomy's Best Drag look (Germany season 1, Episode 12); Minty Fresh - Sminty Drop's Ru Are You? look (UK series 4, Episode 1); Serena Morena - Mariah Balenciaga's All Star Eleganza (All Stars season 5, Episode 8); Sminty Drop - Gawdland's Clown Is Sexy And I Know It look (Thailand season 3, Episode 5); The Only Naomy - Minty Fresh's Shop-ulence: She Buys Everything! look (Philippines season 1, Episode 7); Zahirah Zapanta - Serena Morena's La Noche de las Mil María Félix look (México season 1, Episode 3); On the runway, Fontana, Gawdland, and Mariah Balenciaga receive positive critiques, with Gawdland winning the challenge. Melinda Verga, Minty Fresh, and The Only Naomy receive negative critiques. RuPaul then announces that the winner of each challenge moving forward, will win the Chippy Tea. The recipient will get the power to save one of the bottom three queens from lip-syncing. Gawdland saved Minty Fresh from the bottom two. Melinda Verga and The Only Naomy lip-sync to "I Begin to Wonder" by Dannii Minogue. The Only Naomy wins the lip-sync and Melinda Verga is the first queen to sashay away.: Guest Judge: Kristen McMenamy; Alternating Judge: Alan Carr; Main Challenge: Present two looks on the runway, with one of them being reworked from another queen's outfit; Runway Themes: RuDemption and The RuMix; Challenge Winner: Gawdland; Bottom Two: Melinda Verga and The Only Naomy; Lip-Sync Song: "I Begin to Wonder" by Dannii Minogue; Eliminated: Melinda Verga; Farewell Message: "💓"
17	3	"The Miss Snatch Game Pageant"	10 February 2026
For this week's main challenge the queens will play a special version of the Snatch Game, the "Miss Snatch Game Pageant". The queens have to compete in three rounds: Grand Entrance, Question & Answer and Swimwear. Ashley Roberts and Kimberly Wyatt star as the celebrity contestants and pageant judges. The cast consisted of: Fontana as Carmen Miranda; Gawdland as Cardi B; Kate Butch as Humpty Dumpty; Mariah Balenciaga as Jackée Harry; Minty Fresh as Unicorn; Serena Morena as Charo; Sminty Drop as Big Bad Wolf; The Only Naomy as Gerrharrt H. (Adolf Hitler's Brother); Zahirah Zapanta as Jessica Alves; On the runway, category is "Let Them Eat Capes". Gawdland, Sminty Drop and The Only Naomy receive positive critiques with Gawdland winning the challenge. Fontana, Minty Fresh and Serena Morena receive negative critiques and are announced as the bottom three queens of the week. As the winner Gawdland uses the Chippy Tea to save Serena Morena from the bottom two. Fontana and Minty Fresh lipsync to "Angel of My Dreams" by Jade. Fontana wins the lipsync and Minty Fresh sashays away.: Guest Judge: Jade Thirlwall; Alternating Judge: Alan Carr; Main Challenge: Compete in the Miss Snatch Game Pageant; Runway Themes: Let Them Eat Capes; Challenge Winner: Gawdland; Bottom Two: Fontana and Minty Fresh; Lip-Sync Song: "Angel of My Dreams" by Jade; Eliminated: Minty Fresh; Farewell Message: "NOW CLEAN THIS ♡♡ BITCHES ♡♡ ♡Minty"
18	4	"Girl Groups from Outer Space"	17 February 2026
For this week's main challenge, the queens write, record, and perform verses to "I'm in Love with an Alien".: Team Dollagramz: Gawdland, Mariah Balenciaga, Sminty Drop and Zahirah Zapanta; Team The Warmholes: Fontana, Kate Butch, Serena Morena and The Only Naomy; On the runway, category is "You're A Star Baby". Gawdland, Kate Butch and The Only Naomy receive positive critiques with Kate Butch winning the challenge. Mariah Balenciaga, Serena Morena and Sminty Drop receive negative critiques and are announced as the bottom three queens of the week. As the winner, Kate Butch uses the Chippy Tea to save Mariah Balenciaga from the bottom two. Serena Morena and Sminty Drop lipsync to "I Heard A Rumour" by Bananarama. Serena Morena wins the lipsync and Sminty Drop sashays away.: Guest Judges: Keren Woodward and Sara Dallin (from Bananarama); Alternating Judge: Graham Norton; Main Challenge: Write, record, and perform verses to "I'm in Love with an Alien"; Runway Themes: You're A Star Baby; Challenge Winner: Kate Butch; Bottom Two: Serena Morena and Sminty Drop; Lip-Sync Song: "I Heard A Rumour" by Bananarama; Eliminated: Sminty Drop; Farewell Message: "You will begin to cough in 7 DAYS! love Sminty"
19	5	"Silent Movie Acting Challenge"	24 February 2026
For this week's mini-challenge, the queens read each other to filth. The Only Naomy wins the mini-challenge. For this week's main challenge, the queens split into two groups to star in two silent films.: Ain't Nothing Goin' On But The Rent: Kate Butch, Mariah Balenciaga, The Only Naomy and Zahirah Zapanta; Up The Aisle: Fontana, Gawdland and Serena Morena; On the runway, category is "She-vil Movie Villains". Gawdland, Kate Butch, Mariah Balenciaga and The Only Naomy receive positive critiques with Mariah Balenciaga winning the challenge. Fontana, Serena Morena and Zahirah Zapanta receive negative critiques and are announced as the bottom three queens of the week. As the winner, Mariah Balenciaga uses the Chippy Tea to save Zahirah Zapanta from the bottom two. Fontana and Serena Morena lipsync to "Axel F" by Crazy Frog. Fontana wins the lipsync and Serena Morena sashays away.: Guest Judges: Will Poulter; Alternating Judge: Alan Carr; Mini-Challenge: Reading is Fundamental; Mini-Challenge Winner: The Only Naomy; Main Challenge: Star in two silent films; Runway Themes: She-vil Movie Villains; Challenge Winner: Mariah Balenciaga; Bottom Two: Fontana and Serena Morena; Lip-Sync Song: "Axel F" by Crazy Frog; Eliminated: Serena Morena; Farewell Message: "I l♡ve u my queens! ¡ Viva Méxic♡ Serena Morena"
20	6	"RuPaul's Fringe Festival"	3 March 2026
For this week's main challenge the queens get paired up, to perform a stand-up comedy routine at the "RuPaul's Fringe Festival". The pairings are: The Only Naomy and Zahirah Zapanta; Gawdland and Mariah Balenciaga; Fontana and Kate Butch; On the runway, category is "Ruveal". RuPaul then announces that the rules of the Chippy Tea are no longer in effect. Fontana and Kate Butch receive positive critiques with Kate Butch winning the challenge. Mariah Balenciaga, The Only Naomy and Zahirah Zapanta receive negative critiques with The Only Naomy being declared safe. Mariah Balenciaga and Zahirah Zapanta lipsync to "Rasputin" by Boney M.. Mariah Balenciaga wins the lipsync and Zahirah Zapanta sashays away.: Guest Judge: Lucy Punch; Alternating Judge: Graham Norton; Main Challenge: In pairs, perform a stand-up comedy routine at the "RuPaul's Fringe Festival"; Runway Themes: Ruveal; Challenge Winner: Kate Butch; Bottom Two: Mariah Balenciaga and Zahirah Zapanta; Lip-Sync Song: "Rasputin" by Boney M.; Eliminated: Zahirah Zapanta; Farewell Message: "You are all HONKING. Woof woof. Love you Zaza x"
21	7	"Olympian Makeovers"	10 March 2026
For this week's main challenge, the queens makeover a Team GB Olympian into a member of their drag family. The pairs are: Fontana and Molly Thompson-Smith; Gawdland and Greg Rutherford; Kate Butch and Celia Quansah; Mariah Balenciaga and Daniel Jervis; The Only Naomy and Shanaze Reade.; On the runway, category is "Drag Family Resemblance". Fontana and Mariah Balenciaga receive positive critiques with Mariah Balenciaga winning the challenge. Kate Butch, Gawdland and The Only Naomy receive negative critiques with Gawdland being declared safe. Kate Butch and The Only Naomy lipsync to "Left Outside Alone" by Anastacia. Kate Butch wins the lipsync and The Only Naomy sashays away.: Guest Judge: Anastacia; Alternating Judge: Graham Norton; Main Challenge: Makeover Team GB Olympians into members of your drag family; Runway Themes: Drag Family Resemblance; Challenge Winner: Mariah Balenciaga; Bottom Two: Kate Butch and The Only Naomy; Lip-Sync Song: "Left Outside Alone" by Anastacia; Eliminated: The Only Naomy; Farewell Message:
22	8	"Reunion & Lip Sync Smack Down For The Crown"	17 March 2026
For this week’s grand finale, all the eliminated queens return to discuss everything that went down during the series. Serena Morena gets elected as Miss Congeniality by her fellow contestants. All queens walk the runway one last time, in their "Finale Eleganza Extravaganza". After the runway the lip-sync smackdown for the crown begins. The first lip-sync is between Gawdland and Mariah Balenciaga. They lipsync to "Broken Heels" by Alexandra Burke. Gawdland wins the lip-sync and moves forward to the final lip-sync for the crown, with Mariah Balenciaga being eliminated. The second lip-sync is between Fontana and Kate Butch. They lipsync to "Ride On Time" by Black Box. Kate Butch wins the lip-sync and moves forward to the final lip-sync for the crown, with Fontana being eliminated. The final lip-sync is between Gawdland and Kate Butch. They lipsync to "What Do I Have To Do?" by Kylie Minogue. Gawdland wins the lip-sync and is announced as the winner, leaving Kate Butch as the runner-up.: Alternating Judges: Alan Carr and Graham Norton; Miss Congeniality: Serena Morena; Runway Theme: Finale Eleganza Extravaganza; Final Four: Fontana, Gawdlaand. Kate Butch and Mariah Balenciaga; Lip-Sync Smackdown #1: Gawdland vs. Mariah Balenciaga; Lip-Sync Song: "Broken Heels" by Alexandra Burke; Eliminated: Mariah Balenciaga; Lip-Sync Smackdown #2: Fontana vs. Kate Butch; Lip-Sync Song: "Ride On Time" by Black Box; Eliminated: Fontana; Lip-Sync Smackdown #3: Gawdland vs. Kate Butch; Lip-Sync Song: ""What Do I Have To Do?" by Kylie Minogue; Runner-up: Kate Butch; Winner of RuPaul's Drag Race: UK vs. the World Series Three: Gawdland
