= Sminty Drop =

English drag performer (born 1999)

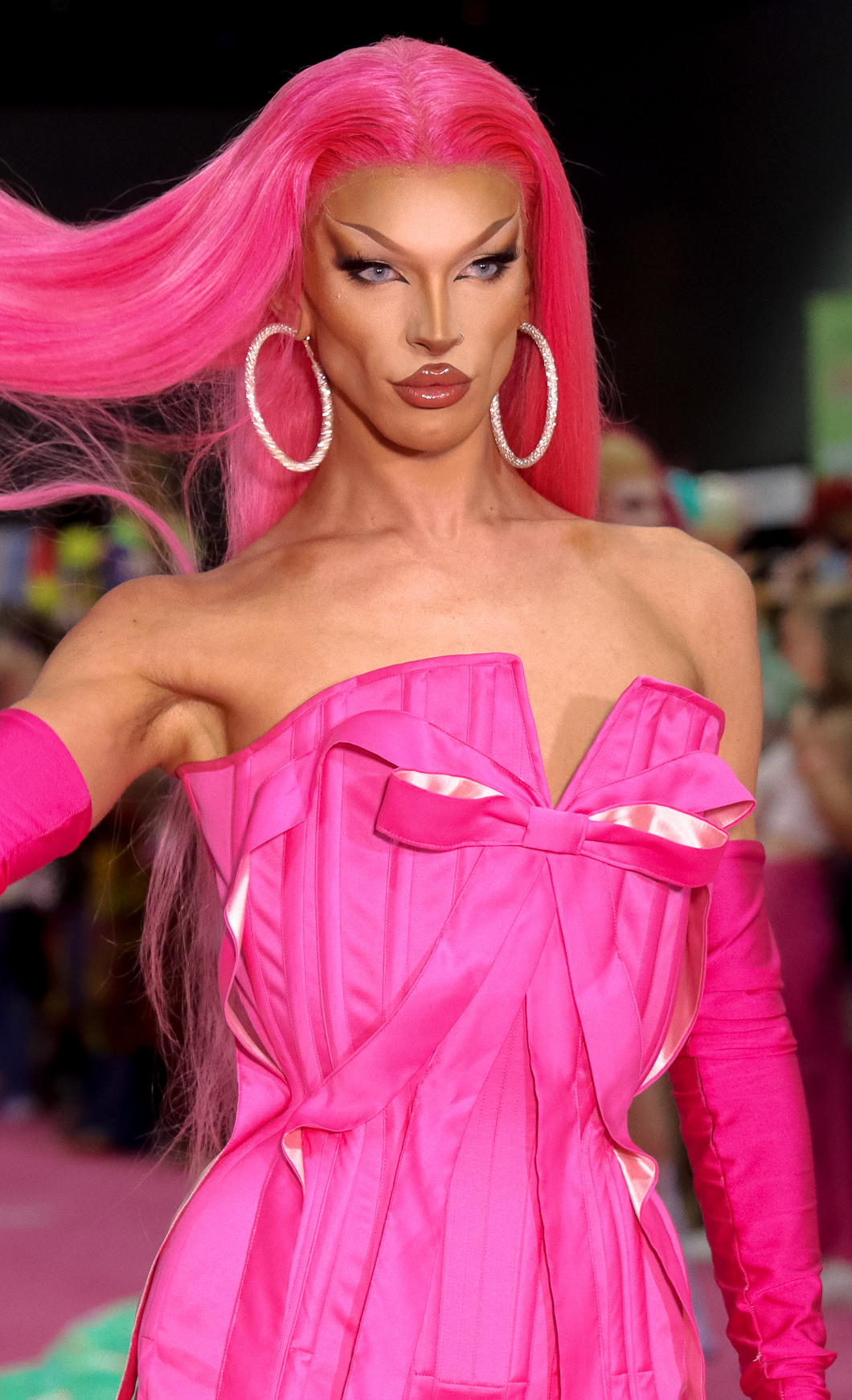
- Sminty Drop at RuPaul's DragCon LA, 2023
- Born: Callum Joseph Alan Shaw; 31 January 1999 (age 27); Ribble Valley, Lancashire, England
- Occupation: Drag queen
- Television: RuPaul's Drag Race UK (Series 4); RuPaul's Drag Race: UK vs. the World (Series 3)

Sminty Drop is the stage name of Callum Joseph Alan Shaw (born 31 January 1999), an English drag queen who competed on the fourth series of RuPaul's Drag Race UK and the third series of RuPaul's Drag Race: UK vs. the World.

== Early life ==
Sminty Drop was born in Ribble Valley.

== Career ==
The name Sminty Drop comes from me being on a night out and wanting to kiss some boys, so I would always take some mints with me just in case. […] But I’m also a very clumsy girl so I would always drop said mints on the floor so… Sminty Drop I became.

— Sminty Drop, describing the origin of her stage name.

Sminty Drop competed on the fourth series of RuPaul's Drag Race UK. She had been doing drag for approximately three years at the time. She was eliminated in the fourth episode, after placing in the bottom two in an improv challenge and losing a lip sync against Baby to Mel and Kim's "Respectable" (1987). After the show aired, she toured with her fellow cast members.

Sminty Drop has performed at WorldPride. She appears in the music video for "Anniversary" by Duran Duran.

She competed on the third series of RuPaul's Drag Race: UK vs. the World.

== Personal life ==
Sminty Drop is from Clitheroe, Lancashire. She is a member of the House of Kendoll, with former Drag Race UK contestant Gothy Kendoll.

== Discography ==
=== Singles ===
- Xlr8 (with Gothy Kendoll & Forbid) (2022)
- SWERK (2026)

== Filmography ==
=== Television ===
Year	Title	Role	Notes
2022	RuPaul's Drag Race UK	Herself	Contestant (9th place); Series 4, 6 episodes
2023	RuPaul's Drag Race UK	Herself	Special guest; Series 5 Episode 1: "Tickety-Boo"
2024	Bring Back My Girls	Herself	Special guest; Season 2 and Season 3
2026	RuPaul's Drag Race: UK vs. the World	Herself	Contestant; Series 3
