= The Only Naomy =

German drag queen

The Only Naomy (real first name Robin) is a German drag performer who competed on the first season of Drag Race Germany and the third series of RuPaul's Drag Race: UK vs. the World.

== Early life and career ==
The Only Naomy was born in 1999 or 2000 and raised in the Oberbergischer Kreis. Her "drag mothers" (mentors) are Pam Pengco and Tittyana. Naomy additionally has two "drag children" of her own, The Only Trashy Gorgeous and The Only Peper. She became interested in makeup at the age of 14, discovered RuPaul's Drag Race, and made her drag debut at Exile, a queer bar in Cologne, at age 16. Naomy later relocated to Cologne, where she currently lives. As a day job, she works as a makeup artist for MAC Cosmetics.

== Filmography ==
=== Television ===
Year	Title	Role	Notes
2023	Drag Race Germany	Contestant	10th place
2026	RuPaul's Drag Race: UK vs. the World (series 3)	Contestant	5th place
