= Jonbers Blonde =

Irish drag performer and entertainer

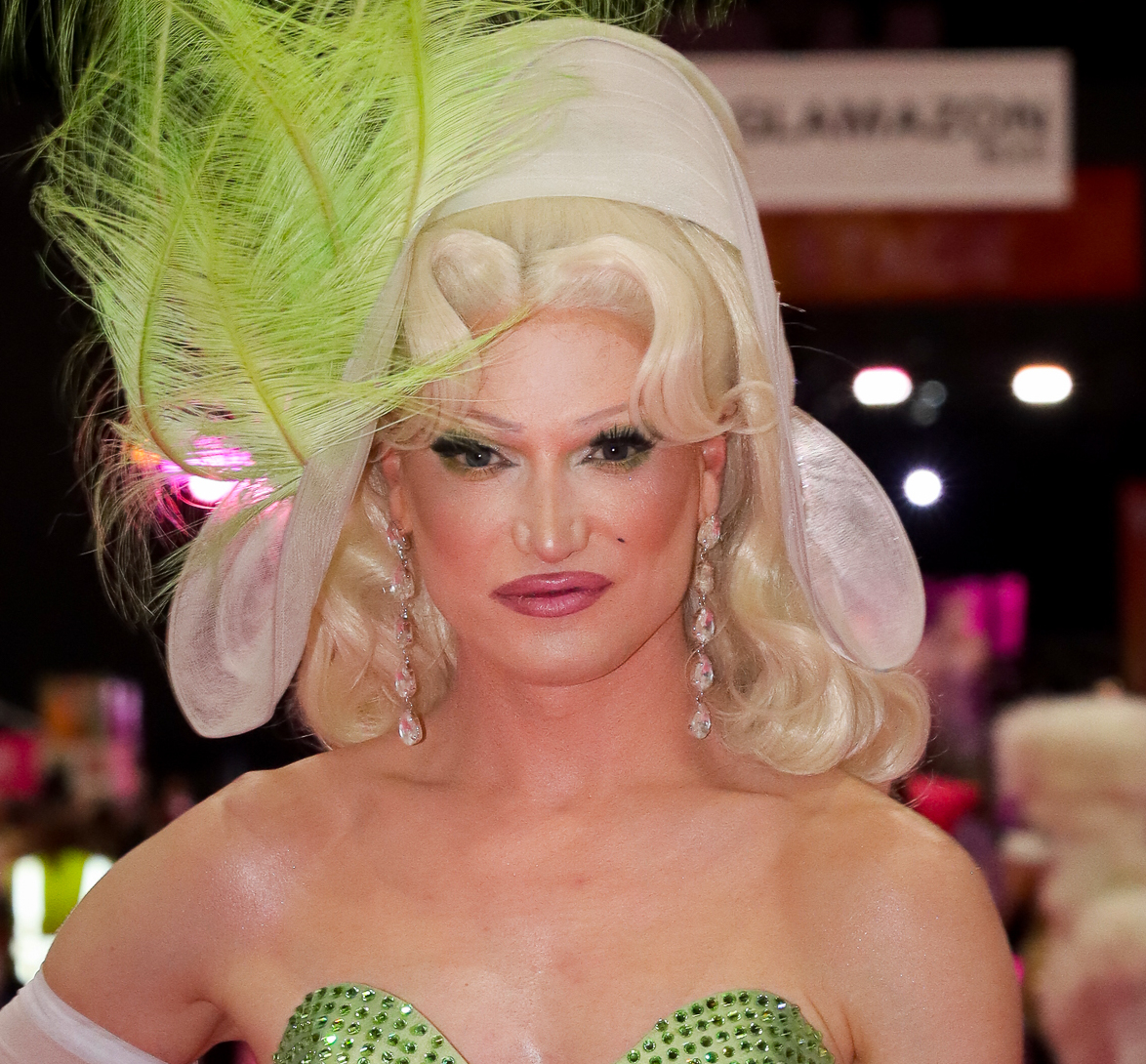
- Jonbers Blonde at RuPaul's DragCon LA, 2024
- Born: Andrew Glover; Belfast, Northern Ireland
- Other name: JonBenet Blonde
- Occupation: Drag queen
- Television: RuPaul's Drag Race UK (series 4); RuPaul's Drag Race: UK vs. the World (series 2)

Jonbers Blonde, also known mononymously as Jonbers, is the stage name of Andrew Glover, a Northern Irish drag queen, model, and entertainer most known for competing on series 4 of RuPaul's Drag Race UK and the second series of RuPaul's Drag Race: UK vs. the World.

== Career ==
Glover is a model and entertainer who performs in drag as Jonbers Blonde (previously JonBenet Blonde). He has also worked as a fashion editor and walked runways in London and Paris, collaborating with Nadine Coyle, Sophie Ellis-Bextor, Melanie C, Sam Smith, Little Mix and Years & Years.

Jonbers Blonde competed on series 4 of RuPaul's Drag Race UK. She did not win any challenges and therefore receive any badges but placed joint-third in the finale. She made a cameo appearance in the series I Hate Suzie. She returned to compete in the second series of RuPaul's Drag Race: UK vs. the World, where she placed ninth after being eliminated in the third episode by Scarlet Envy.

On the 18th of August 2023, Jonbers Blonde hosted a one woman show - The Troubles with Drag - at The Glory (now The Divine) in East London. In which she recounted tales from her life - and revealed the Madonna story.

== Personal life ==
Glover is from Belfast, Northern Ireland. In August 2023, rumors began to circulate that Blonde was in a relationship with comedian and Drag Race UK judge Alan Carr after a photo was released depicting the two holding hands in public the year prior, a few months after Carr separated from his husband. However, Blonde confirmed on Twitter that he is currently not in a relationship.

== Discography ==
=== Singles ===
- In Fashion (2024)
- Don't Know You Anymore (2024)

== Filmography ==
=== Television ===
- RuPaul's Drag Race UK (series 4, 2022)
- I Hate Suzie (2022)
- RuPaul's Drag Race: UK vs. the World (series 2)
- Bring Back My Girls (2024)
