= Kate Butch =

British drag performer

- Born: Marcus Crabb; 1996 or 1997 (age 29–30); Northallerton, North Yorkshire, England
- Education: University of York
- Occupations: Drag queen, stand-up comedian
- Television: RuPaul's Drag Race UK (Series 5); RuPaul's Drag Race: UK vs. the World (Series 3)

Kate Butch is the stage name of Marcus Crabb, a British drag queen and stand-up comedian known for competing on the fifth series of RuPaul's Drag Race UK and the third series of RuPaul's Drag Race: UK vs. the World.

== Career ==
Kate Butch is a drag queen and stand-up comedian who started her career in London in 2018. She first did drag at the age of six, when she performed as the pantomime dame in her school's play. Her stage name is a reference to singer Kate Bush and the lesbian slang term "butch". She studied theatre at the University of York and was the marketing and events manager for the university's Drama Society, as well as a member of the Comedy Society and the Central Hall Music Society. Kate began performing in drag with friends after being inspired by the seventh season of RuPaul's Drag Race. Her first performance was made at Fibbers, a venue in York. She is also the co-host of the Queers Gone By podcast, which The Guardian deemed one of the top 50 humorous podcasts. She performed in the Edinburgh Festival Fringe comedy shows "Drag Queens vs. Zombies" and "Drag Queens vs. Vampires" with Crudi Dench in 2022, and in her solo shows "Kate If You Wanna Go Butcher" (2017) and "Wuthering Shites" (2025). In 2023, she competed on series 5 of RuPaul's Drag Race UK.

BBC has described Kate Butch as a "tribute drag act" to their favourite artist Kate Bush. During her time on Drag Race, Kate Butch impersonated Bush for the Snatch Game challenge and won an acting challenge. She was eliminated from the competition after placing in the bottom two of the makeover challenge and losing a lip sync against DeDeLicious, placing fifth overall.

In October 2023, Kate Butch spoke out against the Conservative Party when MP Tom Tugendhat jokingly changed his profile picture on Twitter to that of Butch's likeness after the two were said to look similar.

On 31 December 2024, Kate Butch was the winner of BBC's Celebrity Mastermind. In 2026, she returned to compete on the third series of RuPaul's Drag Race: UK vs. the World. She ultimately placed as the runner-up to Gawdland from Drag Race Thailand.

== Personal life ==
Crabb was born in Northallerton, North Yorkshire, England, and is currently based in Buxton, Derbyshire. and uses the pronouns she/her in drag and they/them out of drag. She refers to herself as "the Comic Sans of drag", meaning it as "an excuse to get away with not being the most visually polished drag artist".

== Discography ==
=== Albums ===
- Wuthering Shites (2025)

=== Singles ===
==== As lead artist ====
Title	Year	Album
"This Woman's Work"	2023	Wuthering Shites
"Maybe on This Occasion"	2026	non-album single

==== As featured artist ====
Title	Year	Album
"Don't Ick My Yum (The M-52s Version)" (among the Cast of RuPaul's Drag Race UK series 5)	2023	non-album single
"Pant-Oh She Better Don't: The Rusical" (among the Cast of RuPaul's Drag Race UK series 5)	2023	Pant-Oh She Better Don't: The Rusical Album
"I'm in Love with an Alien (The Warmholes)" (among the Cast of RuPaul's Drag Race: UK vs. the World series 3)	2026	non-album single

== Filmography ==
=== Television ===
Year	Title	Role	Notes
2023	RuPaul's Drag Race UK (series 5)	Contestant	5th place
2024	Bring Back My Girls	Herself	Special guest; Season 3, Episode 1
2024	Celebrity Mastermind	Contestant	Series 23, episode 7
2026	RuPaul's Drag Race: UK vs. the World (series 3)	Contestant	Runner-up

== Theatre ==
- Drag Queens vs. Zombies (2023)
