= Fontana (drag queen) =

Brazilian drag performer (born 1993)

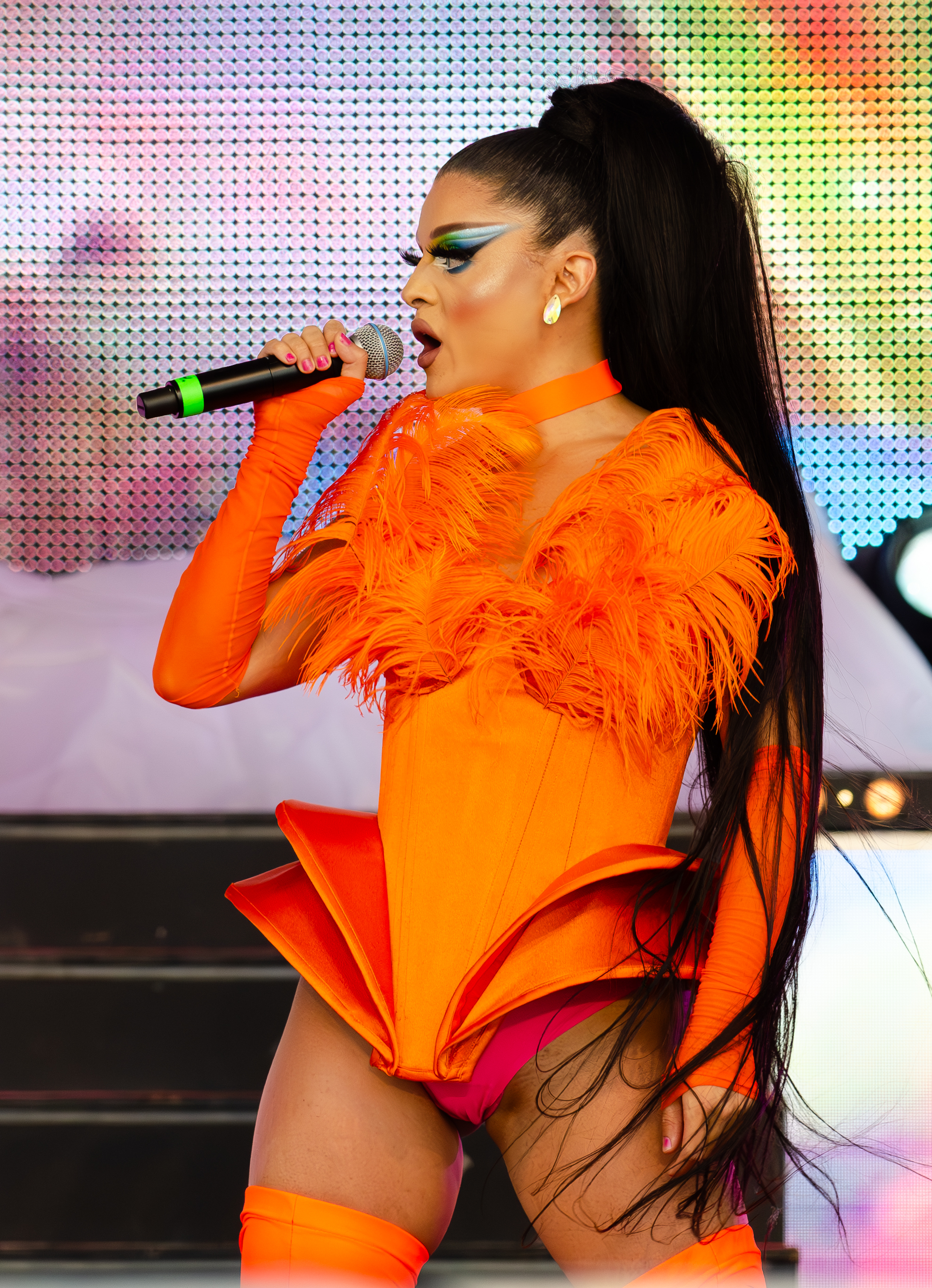
- Fontana in Glamspäck at Stockholm Pride 2023
- Born: Gabriella Fontana Teixeira; June 10, 1993 (age 33); Vila Esperança, São Leopoldo, Rio Grande do Sul, Brazil
- Occupations: Drag queen; dancer; singer
- Years active: 2014–present

Gabriella Fontana Teixeira, better known as Fontana, is a Brazilian drag performer, who rose to fame for participating in the first season of Drag Race Sverige and the third season of RuPaul's Drag Race: UK vs. the World.

== Early life and career ==
Gabriella Fontana Teixeira was born in the neighborhood of Vila Esperança in São Leopoldo, Rio Grande do Sul, Brazil, one of two children. Her father was a tire repairman and her mother a nursing assistant. She was the first member of her family to attend university, and was only able to with aide from the Programa Universidade para Todos (English: University for All Program). After residing in Brasília and Rio de Janeiro, she moved to Stockholm, Sweden in 2014 to live with her then-boyfriend. After the two's relationship ended, she decided to stay there and began studying business administration. To support herself, she worked in the office of a multinational company and taught English on weekends.

Fontana was announced as one of the participants for the first season of Drag Race Sverige, which began airing on 4 March 2023. Fontana became the first Brazilian drag queen to compete in the Swedish reality series, and the second in the Drag Race franchise, after Miss Abby OMG from Drag Race Holland.

In 2025, Fontana appeared as a guest judge on episode two of Drag Race Brasil season 2. In 2026, she was announced as one of the participants for the third season of RuPaul's Drag Race: UK vs. the World, which began airing on 27 January 2026. Fontana became the second Drag Race Sverige competitor to compete on an international franchise of Drag Race, following Vanity Vain on the first season of Global All Stars. She is an ambassador for NYX Professional Makeup.

== Personal life ==
Fontana uses she/her pronouns in and out of drag. She is a trans woman. She has spoken out extensively about xenophobia in Sweden.

== Filmography ==
=== Television ===
Year	Title	Role	Notes
2023	Drag Race Sverige	Contestant	Runner-up
2023	Drag Race Sverige Untucked!	Herself	8 episodes
2025	Drag Race Brasil	Herself	Guest judge; Series 2, Episode 2 “Paper Cuts”
2026	RuPaul's Drag Race: UK vs. the World (series 3)	Contestant	3rd place
