= RuPaul's Drag Race: UK vs. the World series 2 =

2024 series of RuPaul's Drag Race: UK vs. the World

RuPaul's Drag Race: UK vs. the World
- Series 2
- Promotional poster for Series 2
- Hosted by: RuPaul
- Judges: RuPaul; Michelle Visage; Alan Carr; Graham Norton
- No. of contestants: 11
- Winner: Tia Kofi
- Runner-up: Hannah Conda
- Miss Congeniality: Arantxa Castilla-La Mancha
- No. of episodes: 8

Release
- Original network: BBC Three / BBC iPlayer (UK); WOW Presents Plus (International)
- Original release: 9 February – 29 March 2024

Series chronology
- ← Previous; Series 1 Next → Series 3

The second series of RuPaul's Drag Race: UK vs. the World began airing on BBC Three and BBC iPlayer on 9 February 2024. RuPaul returned to his role of main host and head judge, and again was joined on the judging panel by Michelle Visage, Alan Carr and Graham Norton, all of whom are judges on RuPaul's Drag Race UK.

In addition to the previous series' prize it was confirmed that, for this series, a cash prize of £50,000 is up for grabs.

The series concluded on 29 March 2024, in a finale that was won by Tia Kofi, who was previously a contestant on the second series of RuPaul's Drag Race UK.

== Production ==
In December 2023, the BBC announced that RuPaul's Drag Race: UK vs. the World would return for a second series. Sinitta was announced to have been signed as a guest for the second series, with a source stating: "Sinitta is one of the most exciting signings in the show’s history. She’s a bona fide gay icon and loves outrageous outfits, so she's perfect for Drag Race". She appeared in the Snatch Game segment of the show alongside Jane McDonald.

== Contestants ==
Ages, names, and cities stated are at time of filming.

Contestants of RuPaul's Drag Race: UK vs. the World series 2 and their backgrounds
Contestant	Age	Hometown	Original season(s)	Original placement(s)	Outcome
Tia Kofi	32	South London, United Kingdom	UK series 2	7th place	Winner
Hannah Conda	31	Sydney, Australia	Down Under season 2	Runner-up	Runner-up
La Grande Dame	23	Nice, France	France season 1	Runner-up	3rd place
Marina Summers	26	Makati, Philippines	Philippines season 1	Runner-up	3rd place
Scarlet Envy	31	New York City, United States	US season 11	10th place	5th place
Scarlet Envy	31	New York City, United States	All Stars 6	9th place	5th place
Choriza May	31	Newcastle upon Tyne, United Kingdom	UK series 3	6th place	6th place
Gothy Kendoll	25	Leicester, United Kingdom	UK series 1	10th place	7th place
Keta Minaj	42	Amsterdam, Netherlands	Holland season 2	4th place	8th place
Jonbers Blonde	33	Belfast, United Kingdom	UK series 4	3rd place	9th place
Arantxa Castilla-La Mancha	25	Madrid, Spain	España season 1	7th place	10th place (Note: Arantxa Castilla-La Mancha was voted Miss Congeniality.)
Mayhem Miller	41	Riverside, United States	US season 10	10th place	11th place
Mayhem Miller	41	Riverside, United States	All Stars 5	7th place	11th place

== Contestant progress ==
Legend:

Tia Kofi won RuPaul's Drag Race: UK vs. the World series 2.
Hannah Conda was the runner-up.
Arantxa Castilla-La Mancha was voted Miss Congeniality (Miss C) by fellow contestants.
WIN indicates that the contestant won the challenge and the Lip Sync for the World.
TOP2 indicates that the contestant won the challenge, but lost the Lip Sync for the World.
SAFE indicates that the contestant was declared safe by the judges.
BTM (Bottom) indicates that the contestant was up for elimination.
ELIM (Eliminated) indicates that the contestant was eliminated.
Guest indicates that the contestant returned as a guest.

Contestants progress with placements in each episode
Contestant	Episode							
Contestant	1	2	3	4	5	6	7	8
Tia Kofi	SAFE	SAFE	TOP2	WIN	TOP2	SAFE	TOP2	Winner
Hannah Conda	SAFE	SAFE	SAFE	TOP2	SAFE	TOP2	WIN	Runner-up
La Grande Dame	TOP2	WIN	SAFE	SAFE	SAFE	SAFE	BTM	Eliminated
Marina Summers	WIN	SAFE	SAFE	SAFE	WIN	WIN	BTM	Eliminated
Scarlet Envy	SAFE	SAFE	WIN	SAFE	SAFE	BTM	ELIM	Guest
Choriza May	SAFE	BTM	SAFE	SAFE	BTM	ELIM		Guest
Gothy Kendoll	BTM	SAFE	SAFE	BTM	ELIM			Guest
Keta Minaj	SAFE	TOP2	BTM	ELIM				Guest
Jonbers Blonde	SAFE	SAFE	ELIM					Guest
Arantxa Castilla-La Mancha	SAFE	ELIM						Miss C
Mayhem Miller	ELIM							Guest

== Lip syncs ==
Legend:

The contestant was eliminated after their first time in the bottom.
The contestant was eliminated after their second time in the bottom.
The contestant was eliminated after their third time in the bottom.
The contestant won the first round of the Lip Sync Smackdown for the Crown and advanced to the second.
The contestant won the second round of the Lip Sync Smackdown for the Crown and was declared the winner of the season.

Episode	Contestants (Elimination)			Song	Winner	Bottom	Eliminated
1	La Grande Dame (Mayhem)	vs.	Marina Summers (Mayhem)	"Dreamer" (Livin' Joy)	Marina Summers	Gothy, Mayhem	Mayhem Miller
2	Keta Minaj (Choriza)	vs.	La Grande Dame (Arantxa)	"Everytime We Touch" (Cascada)	La Grande Dame	Arantxa, Choriza	Arantxa Castilla-La Mancha
3	Scarlet Envy (Jonbers)	vs.	Tia Kofi (Jonbers)	"Future Starts Now" (Kim Petras)	Scarlet Envy	Jonbers, Keta	Jonbers Blonde
4	Hannah Conda (Gothy)	vs.	Tia Kofi (Keta)	"Crying at the Discoteque" (Alcazar)	Tia Kofi	Gothy, Keta	Keta Minaj
5	Marina Summers (Gothy)	vs.	Tia Kofi (Gothy)	"Fucking Wizardry" (Self Esteem)	Marina Summers	Choriza, Gothy	Gothy Kendoll
6	Hannah Conda (Scarlet)	vs.	Marina Summers (Choriza)	"Release Me" (Agnes)	Marina Summers	Choriza, Scarlet	Choriza May
7	Hannah Conda (Scarlet)	vs.	Tia Kofi (Scarlet)	"Euphoria" (Loreen)	Hannah Conda	La Grande Dame, Marina, Scarlet	Scarlet Envy
Episode	Finalists			Song	Winner		
8	Hannah Conda	vs.	Marina Summers	"I'm Outta Love" (Anastacia)	Hannah Conda		
8	La Grande Dame	vs.	Tia Kofi	"Boogie 2nite (Seamus Haji Big Love Edit)" (Booty Luv)	Tia Kofi		
8	Hannah Conda	vs.	Tia Kofi	"Your Disco Needs You" (Kylie Minogue)	Tia Kofi		

== Guest judges ==
- Richard E. Grant, Swazi-English actor and presenter
- Adwoa Aboah, British fashion model
- Kim Petras, German singer and songwriter
- Tom Daley, British diver and television personality
- Self Esteem, British musician
- Motsi Mabuse, South African dancer and television judge
- Katherine Ryan, Canadian comedian, writer, presenter, actress and singer

=== Special guests ===
Guests who appeared in episodes, but did not judge on the main stage.

Episode 1

- Raven, runner-up of both RuPaul's Drag Race Season 2 and All Stars 1

Episode 4

- Jane McDonald, English singer and television presenter
- Sinitta, British-American singer

Episode 6

- Aljaž Škorjanec, Slovenian dancer and choreographer
- Janette Manrara, Cuban-American television presenter, choreographer and professional dancer

Episode 8

- Blu Hydrangea, contestant on RuPaul's Drag Race UK Series 1 and winner of RuPaul's Drag Race: UK vs. the World Series 1

== Episodes ==
No. overall	No. in series	Title	Original release date
7	1	"The Queen's Variety Show"	9 February 2024
Eleven queens from across the Drag Race franchise enter the competition. RuPaul informs them that for the main challenge, the queens must perform a talent show in front of the judges.: Arantxa Castilla-La Mancha - Comedy performance; Choriza May - Lip-syncing; Gothy Kendoll - Lip-syncing and fire performance; La Grande Dame - Soundboarding performance; Hannah Conda - Live singing; Jonbers Blonde - Lip-syncing; Keta Minaj - Lip-syncing and pommel horse; Marina Summers - Lip-syncing and Silk Veil Poi; Mayhem Miller - Singing bowl and guided meditation; Scarlet Envy - Live singing; Tia Kofi - Live singing; On the runway, category is "For Queen and Country". Choriza May, La Grande Dame and Marina Summers receive positive critiques, with La Grande Dame and Marina Summers being the Top 2 queens of the week. Gothy Kendoll, Mayhem Miller and Scarlet Envy receive negative critiques, with Gothy Kendoll and Mayhem Miller being the bottom two queens of the week. La Grande Dame and Marina Summers lip-sync to "Dreamer" by Livin' Joy. Marina Summers wins the lip-sync and decides to eliminate Mayhem Miller from the competition.: Guest Judge: Richard E. Grant; Alternating Judge: Alan Carr; Main Challenge: Perform in The Queen's Variety Show; Runway Theme: For Queen and Country; Challenge Winners: La Grande Dame and Marina Summers; Lip-Sync Song: "Dreamer" by Livin' Joy; Lip-Sync for The World Winner: Marina Summers; Bottom Two: Gothy Kendoll and Mayhem Miller; Eliminated: Mayhem Miller; Farewell Message: "Chaka Khan Chaka Khan ♡ May"
8	2	"The Happy Ending Ball"	16 February 2024
The queens enter the workroom and La Grande Dame reveals she would have sent home Mayhem Miller from the competition, had she won the lip-sync. For this week's mini-challenge, the queens select "The Fairest", "The Shadiest", "The Mightiest" and "The Neediest" of the cast. Marina Summers, Hannah Conda, Marina Summers and Arantxa Castilla-La Mancha win the mini-challenge, respectively. For the main challenge, the queens walk the Happy Ending Ball, presenting two looks brought from home and one made in the work room. Categories are Lady Prince Charming, She-vil Queen and Drags to Riches Eleganza. On the runway, Keta Minaj, La Grande Dame and Marina Summers receive positive critiques, with Keta Minaj and La Grande Dame being the Top 2 queens of the week. Arantxa Castilla-La Mancha, Choriza May and Hannah Conda receive negative critiques, with Arantxa Castilla-La Mancha and Choriza May being the bottom two queens of the week. Keta Minaj and La Grande Dame lip-sync to "Everytime We Touch" by Cascada. La Grande Dame wins the lip-sync and decides to eliminate Arantxa Castilla-La Mancha from the competition.: Guest Judge: Adwoa Aboah; Alternating Judge: Graham Norton; Mini-Challenge: Choose "The Fairest", "The Shadiest", "The Mightiest", and "The Neediest" competitor; Mini-Challenge Winners: Marina Summers, Hannah Conda, Marina Summers, and Arantxa Castilla-La Mancha; Main Challenge: Walk the Happy Ending Ball; Runway Themes: Lady Prince Charming, She-vil Queen, and Drags to Riches Eleganza; Challenge Winners: La Grande Dame and Keta Minaj; Lip-Sync Song: "Everytime We Touch" by Cascada; Lip-Sync for The World Winner: La Grande Dame; Bottom Two: Arantxa Castilla-La Mancha and Choriza May; Eliminated: Arantxa Castilla-La Mancha; Farewell Message: "I have a ~~peace~~ piece of my heart with each and every one of you. I ♡ U ARANTXA C–"
9	3	"Drag Race World"	23 February 2024
The queens enter the workroom and Keta Minaj reveals she would have sent home Choriza May from the competition, had she won the lip-sync. For this week's main challenge, the queens are tasked to write and film a promotional video for "Drag Race World" in groups of three. Choriza May, Keta Minaj and La Grande Dame are the team captains. Team Choriza: Choriza May - Inferno After-party; Gothy Kendoll - Get Glam in the Werk Room; Scarlet Envy - Lipsync for the World on the Main Stage; Team Keta: Keta Minaj - Ketamorphosis; Marina Summers - Mabu-HAYYY!; Tia Kofi - UK, Hon?; Team Grande Dame: Hannah Conda - Conda's Cove; Jonbers Blonde - The Patty Party; La Grande Dame - Fraaance!; On the runway, category is "RuVeal Yourself". Gothy Kendoll, Scarlet Envy and Tia Kofi receive positive critiques, with Scarlet Envy and Tia Kofi being the Top 2 queens of the week. Jonbers Blonde, Keta Minaj and La Grande Dame receive negative critiques, with Jonbers Blonde and Keta Minaj being the bottom two queens of the week. Scarlet Envy and Tia Kofi lip-sync to "Future Starts Now" by Kim Petras. Scarlet Envy wins the lip-sync and decides to eliminate Jonbers Blonde from the competition.: Guest Judge: Kim Petras; Alternating Judge: Alan Carr; Main Challenge: In teams of three, write and film a promotional video for "Drag Race World"; Runway Theme: RuVeal Yourself; Challenge Winners: Scarlet Envy and Tia Kofi; Lip-Sync Song: "Future Starts Now" by Kim Petras; Lip-Sync for The World Winner: Scarlet Envy; Bottom Two: Jonbers Blonde and Keta Minaj; Eliminated: Jonbers Blonde; Farewell Message: "You all a bunch a snakes 🐍 GOOD LUCK WITH SNATCH GAME BITCHES ♡ JB"
10	4	"Snatch Game"	1 March 2024
The queens enter the workroom and Tia Kofi reveals she would have sent home Jonbers Blonde from the competition, had she won the lip-sync. For this week's main challenge, the queens will play the Snatch Game. As a twist, the queens will be playing in families, captained by Jane McDonald and Sinitta. The cast consisted of: Team Jane McDonald: Gothy Kendoll as Kim Woodburn; Keta Minaj as Fran Drescher; La Grande Dame as Carla Bruni; Marina Summers as Manny Pacquiao; Team Sinitta: Choriza May as Catherine of Aragon; Hannah Conda as Shirley Temple; Scarlet Envy as the Statue of Liberty; Tia Kofi as Anne Boleyn; On the runway, category is "Gone Cruising: Nautical Looks". Hannah Conda, Scarlet Envy and Tia Kofi receive positive critiques, with Hannah Conda and Tia Kofi being the Top 2 queens of the week. Gothy Kendoll, Keta Minaj and La Grande Dame receive negative critiques, with Gothy Kendoll and Keta Minaj being the bottom two queens of the week. Hannah Conda and Tia Kofi lip-sync to "Crying at the Discoteque" by Alcazar. Tia Kofi wins the lip-sync and decides to eliminate Keta Minaj from the competition.: Guest Judge: Tom Daley; Alternating Judge: Alan Carr; Main Challenge: Snatch Game: Family Edition; Runway Theme: Gone Cruising: Nautical Looks; Challenge Winners: Hannah Conda and Tia Kofi; Lip-Sync Song: "Crying at the Discoteque" by Alcazar; Lip-Sync for The World Winner: Tia Kofi; Bottom Two: Gothy Kendoll and Keta Minaj; Eliminated: Keta Minaj; Farewell Message: "If you ever miss your K call ME ♡ Keta"
11	5	"Seven!: The Rusical"	8 March 2024
The queens enter the workroom and Hannah Conda reveals she would have sent home Gothy Kendoll from the competition, had she won the lip-sync. For this week's mini challenge, the queens must read each other to filth. Tia Kofi wins the mini challenge. For the main challenge, the queens must write verses and perform in the rusical Seven!: Confessions of a Drag Queen, inspired by the musical Six. On the runway, category is "When I Glow Up". Marina Summers and Tia Kofi receive positive critiques and are declared the Top 2 queens of the week. Hannah Conda, La Grande Dame and Scarlet Envy receive largely positive critiques and are declared safe. Choriza May and Gothy Kendoll receive negative critiques and are the bottom two queens of the week. Marina Summers and Tia Kofi lip-sync to "Fucking Wizardry" by Self Esteem. Marina Summers wins the lip-sync and decides to eliminate Gothy Kendoll from the competition.: Guest Judge: Self Esteem; Alternating Judge: Graham Norton; Mini-Challenge: Reading is Fundamental; Mini-Challenge Winner: Tia Kofi; Main Challenge: Perform in the rusical Seven!: Confessions of a Drag Queen; Runway Theme: When I Glow Up; Challenge Winners: Marina Summers and Tia Kofi; Lip-Sync Song: "Fucking Wizardry" by Self Esteem; Lip-Sync for The World Winner: Marina Summers; Bottom Two: Choriza May and Gothy Kendoll; Eliminated: Gothy Kendoll; Farewell Message: "Goodbye Sweethearts ♡ Gothy Kendoll x"
12	6	"Strictly Come Prancing"	15 March 2024
The queens enter the workroom and Tia Kofi reveals she would have sent home Gothy Kendoll from the competition, had she won the lip-sync. For this week's main challenge the queens must dance in pairs to different dance styles while in "half and half" drag: Hannah Conda and Marina Summers dance the samba; Choriza May and Scarlet Envy dance the tango; La Grande Dame and Tia Kofi dance the quickstep; On the runway, category is "Business in the Front, Party in the Back". Hannah Conda and Marina Summers receive positive critiques and are declared the Top 2 queens of the week. La Grande Dame and Tia Kofi receive mixed critiques and are declared safe. Choriza May and Scarlet Envy receive negative critiques and are the bottom two queens of the week. Hannah Conda and Marina Summers lip-sync to "Release Me" by Agnes. Marina Summers wins the lip-sync and decides to eliminate Choriza May from the competition.: Guest Judge: Motsi Mabuse; Alternating Judge: Alan Carr; Main Challenge: Dance in pairs; Runway Theme: Business in the Front, Party in the Back; Challenge Winners: Hannah Conda and Marina Summers; Lip-Sync Song: "Release Me" by Agnes; Lip-Sync for The World Winner: Marina Summers; Bottom Two: Choriza May and Scarlet Envy; Eliminated: Choriza May; Farewell Message: "🔥 I'll see you in Hell (shots on me) 🔥"
13	7	"Haters Wedding Roast"	22 March 2024
The queens enter the workroom and Hannah Conda reveals she would have sent home Scarlet Envy from the competition, had she won the lip-sync. For this week's mini challenge, the queens participate in a hen party dance off. Hannah Conda wins the mini challenge. For this week's main challenge the queens must write and deliver a comedy roast for the wedding of Michelle Visage and Graham Norton. On the runway, category is "Take Me Up the Aisle". Hannah Conda and Tia Kofi receive positive critiques and are declared the Top 2 queens of the week. The three remaining queens are all up for elimination. Hannah Conda and Tia Kofi lip-sync to "Euphoria" by Loreen. Hannah Conda wins the lip-sync and decides to eliminate Scarlet Envy from the competition.: Guest Judge: Katherine Ryan; Alternating Judge: Graham Norton; Mini-Challenge: Hen party dance-off; Mini-Challenge Winner: Hannah Conda; Main Challenge: Write and deliver a wedding roast; Runway Theme: Take Me Up the Aisle; Challenge Winners: Hannah Conda and Tia Kofi; Lip-Sync Song: "Euphoria" by Loreen; Lip-Sync for The World Winner: Hannah Conda; Bottom Three: La Grande Dame, Marina Summers and Scarlet Envy; Eliminated: Scarlet Envy; Farewell Message: "Congratulations! F⭐ck it up! xo Scarlet 💋"
14	8	"Grand Finale"	29 March 2024
The queens enter the workroom and Tia Kofi reveals she would have sent home Scarlet Envy from the competition, had she won the lip-sync. The eliminated queens all return to discuss everything that went down during the series and Arantxa Castilla-La Mancha is voted as Miss Congeniality. The queens walk the runway one last time in their Finale Eleganza Extravaganza. After the runway the lip-sync smackdown for the crown begins. The first lip-sync is between Hannah Conda and Marina Summers. They lip-sync to "I'm Outta Love" by Anastacia. Hannah Conda wins the lip-sync and Marina Summers is eliminated. The second lip-sync is between La Grande Dame and Tia Kofi. They lip-sync to "Boogie 2nite" by Booty Luv. Tia Kofi wins the lip-sync and La Grande Dame is eliminated. The final lip-sync is between Hannah Conda and Tia Kofi. They lip-sync to "Your Disco Needs You" by Kylie Minogue. It is announced that Tia Kofi is the winner, leaving Hannah Conda as the runner-up.: Alternating Judges: Alan Carr and Graham Norton; Miss Congeniality: Arantxa Castilla-La Mancha; Runway Theme: Finale Eleganza Extravaganza; Final Four: Hannah Conda, La Grande Dame, Marina Summers and Tia Kofi; Lip-Sync Smackdown #1: Hannah Conda vs. Marina Summers; Lip-Sync Song: "I'm Outta Love" by Anastacia; Eliminated: Marina Summers; Lip-Sync Smackdown #2: La Grande Dame vs. Tia Kofi; Lip-Sync Song: "Boogie 2nite" by Booty Luv; Eliminated: La Grande Dame; Lip-Sync Smackdown #3: Hannah Conda vs. Tia Kofi; Lip-Sync Song: "Your Disco Needs You" by Kylie Minogue; Runner-up: Hannah Conda; Winner of RuPaul's Drag Race: UK vs. the World Series Two: Tia Kofi
