= Serena Morena =

Mexican drag performer

- Born: David Martell Parra; Aguascalientes
- Occupation: Drag performer
- Known for: Competing on the first season of Drag Race México and the third season of RuPaul's Drag Race: UK vs. the World

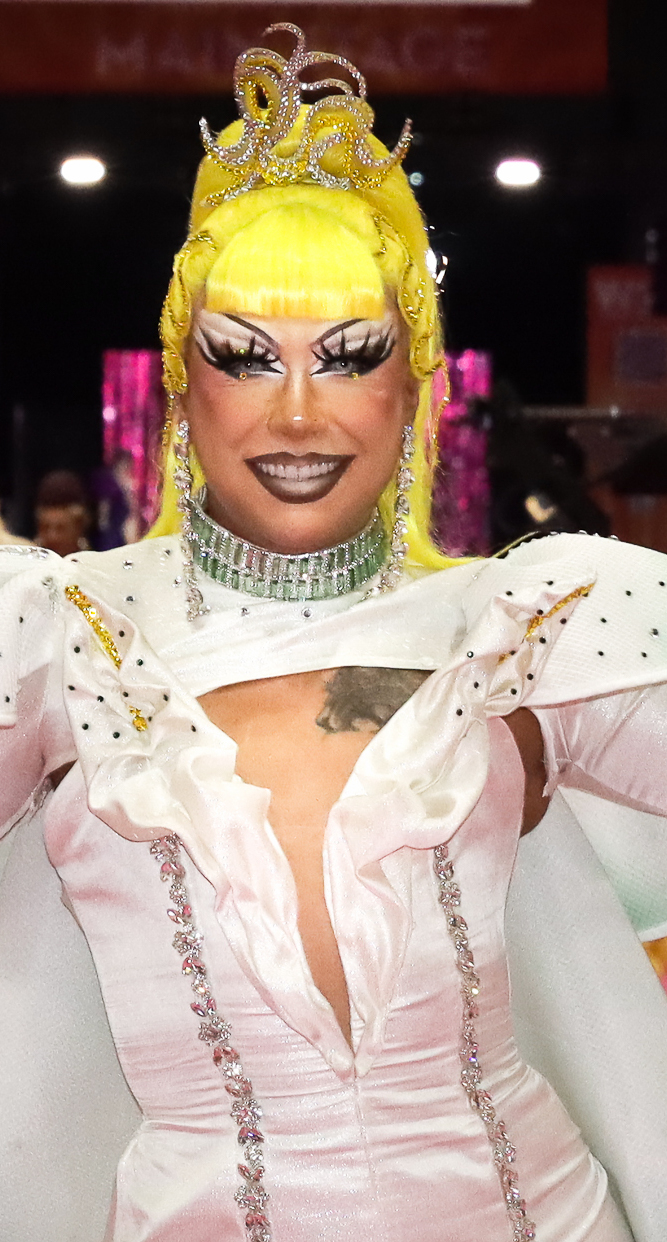
Serena Morena at RuPaul's DragCon LA in 2024

Serena Morena is the stage name of David Martell Parra, a Mexican drag performer who competed on the first season of Drag Race México and the third season of RuPaul's Drag Race: UK vs. the World.

== Personal life ==
Serena Morena is from Aguascalientes.

== Filmography ==
=== Television ===
Year	Title	Role	Notes
2023	Drag Race México (season 1)	Herself (contestant)	8th place
2025	Bring Back My Girls	Guest	Season 4 episode 5
2026	RuPaul's Drag Race: UK vs. the World	Herself (contestant)	7th place

=== Music Videos ===
Year	Title	Artist	Producer
2024	Serena Morena - Me pongo HOT (Video Oficial)	self	N/A
2024	Serena Morena - Perrita Sandunguera (The RUmix)	Self	N/A

== Discography ==
=== Albums ===
Release date	Title
November 21, 2024	Sandunguera

=== Singles ===
Release date	Title
January 30, 2026	Mom, Don't Open The Door

== See also ==
- Drag Race México
- RuPaul's Drag Race: UK vs. the World
