= Frankie Wonga =

Thai drag performer

- Born: Wongboworn (Frank) Pansuwan; October 18, 1993 (age 31); Bangkok, Thailand
- Occupation: Drag queen
- Television: Drag Race Thailand (season 3)

Frankie Wonga (Thai: แฟรงกี้ วองก้า) is the stage name of Wongboworn Pansuwan (วงศ์บวร แป้นสุวรรณ), a Thai drag performer who won the third season of Drag Race Thailand.

== Career ==
Frankie Wonga competed on the third season of Drag Race Thailand at the age of 30. She won three maxi (main) challenges and did not place in the bottom at any point in the competition. She was named the winner after defeating finalist Zepee in a lip-sync contest to "Prawat Sad" (ประวัติศาสตร์; "History") by Christina Aguilar.

== Personal life ==
Frankie Wonga is based in Bangkok.

== Filmography ==
- Drag Race Thailand (season 3; 2024)

== See also ==
- List of drag queens
