= Siam Phusri =

Thai-American drag performer

- Siam Phusri in 2025
- Born: Sarawut Chuchote; September 1, 1989 (age 36); Thailand
- Occupation: Drag performer
- Years active: 2020–
- Known for: Drag Race Thailand; Drag Race Philippines: Slaysian Royale

Siam Phusri (Note: Also stylized as PhuSri.) is the stage name of Sarawut Chuchote (born September 1, 1989), a Thai-American drag performer who competed on the third season of Drag Race Thailand and the first season of Drag Race Philippines: Slaysian Royale.

== Early life ==
Sarawut Chuchote was born in Thailand on September 1, 1989, to two police officers, the second of three children. Chuchote was raised in Chum Phuang, Nakhon Ratchasima and immigrated to the United States in 2011, at the age of 20. After arriving in America, Chuchote worked at their brother's restaurant and then as a message therapist at a spa. Chuchote began working as a flight attendant for Qatar Airways at the age of 24, and then United Airlines five years later.

== Career ==
Chuchote began performing as Siam Phusri in 2020, during the COVID-19 pandemic. Siam Phusri's drag name is a combination of "Siam", the ancient name of Thailand, "phu", meaning land, and "sri", meaning glorious. "Phusri" is additionally pronounced as "pussy", an English vulgar term for the vagina.

Siam Phusri is a member of the Rice Rockettes, an Asian-American drag troupe based in San Francisco, California. She was crowned Mx. GAPA in 2022.

Siam Phusri competed on the third season of Drag Race Thailand in 2024. At the time of being cast, she had just begun living as a monk. She placed seventh out of eleven contestants, being eliminated on the sixth episode after losing a lip-sync to "We Are Beautiful" by SILVY against Gigi Ferocious. In 2025, Siam Phusri was announced as part of the inaugural cast of Drag Race Philippines: Slaysian Royale, where she coincidentally placed seventh and was eliminated on the sixth episode.

== Personal life ==
Currently based in San Francisco, California, Chuchote was born in Thailand. Chuchote obtained U.S. citizenship in 2024.

== Discography ==
=== Singles ===
- Hi Siam (2024)

== Filmography ==
- Drag Race Thailand
- Drag Race Philippines: Slaysian Royale (2025)
- Happy Endings with Bruno (with Bruno Alcantara)
