= Drag Race Thailand season 3 =

Drag Race Thailand
- Season 3
- Promotional poster for season three
- Hosted by: Pangina Heals
- Judges: Pangina Heals; Art Arya; Sha Phatharatada Setthachai; Metinee Kingpayome; Niti Chaichitathorn
- No. of contestants: 11
- Winner: Frankie Wonga
- Runner-up: Zepee
- Miss Congeniality: Benze Diva
- No. of episodes: 10

Release
- Original network: WOW Presents Plus (International)
- Original release: 16 October – 18 December 2024

Season chronology
- ← Previous; Season 2

The third season of Drag Race Thailand premiered on 16 October 2024. The season is airing on WOW Presents Plus internationally. The season was confirmed by World of Wonder on 17 October 2023.

The winner of the season is Frankie Wonga, while Zepee is the runner-up.

== Production ==
On 7 December 2023, it was announced via WOW Presents Plus official Instagram page, that casting for the third season was now open. Applications remained open for three weeks until closing on 31 December.

On 14 November 2023, it was announced that Pangina Heals, who co-hosted the first two seasons, would return as the main host of the show. Art Arya, who served as the main host in the first two seasons, returned to the judging panel as a permanent judge.

Eleven contestants were announced on 18 September 2024.

== Contestants ==
Ages, names, and cities stated are at time of filming.

Contestants of Drag Race Thailand season 3 and their backgrounds
Contestant	Age	Hometown	Outcome
Frankie Wonga	30	Bangkok	Winner
Zepee	29	Phrae	Runner-up
Gawdland	22	Chiang Mai	3rd place
Spicy Sunshine	30	Bangkok	3rd place
Nane Sphera	33	Chiang Mai	5th place
Gigi Ferocious	28	Bangkok	6th place
Siam Phusri	34	San Francisco, United States	7th place
Benze Diva	42	Samutprakan	8th place (Note: Benze Diva was voted Miss Congeniality by fellow contestants.)
Shortgun	22	Chiang Mai	9th place
Kara Might	27	Ratchaburi	10th place
Srirasha Hotsauce	27	Bangkok	11th place

== Contestants progress ==
Legend:

Frankie Wonga won Drag Race Thailand season 3.
Zepee was the runner-up.
Benze Diva was voted Miss Congeniality (Miss C) by fellow contestants.
WIN indicates that the contestant won the challenge.
SAFE indicates that the contestant was declared safe by the judges.
BTM (Bottom) indicates that the contestant was up for elimination.
ELIM (Eliminated) indicates that the contestant was eliminated.

Contestants progress with placements in each episode
Contestant	Episode									
Contestant	1	2	3	4	5	6	7	8	9	10
Frankie Wonga	WIN	SAFE	SAFE	SAFE	SAFE	SAFE	WIN	SAFE	WIN	Winner
Zepee	SAFE	SAFE	WIN	WIN	SAFE	SAFE	SAFE	SAFE	BTM	Runner-up
Gawdland	SAFE	SAFE	SAFE	SAFE	SAFE	WIN	SAFE	WIN	SAFE	Eliminated
Spicy Sunshine	SAFE	BTM	BTM	SAFE	WIN	SAFE	SAFE	BTM	BTM	Eliminated
Nane Sphera	SAFE	WIN	SAFE	SAFE	SAFE	SAFE	BTM	ELIM		Guest
Gigi Ferocious	SAFE	SAFE	SAFE	SAFE	BTM	BTM	ELIM			Guest
Siam Phusri	SAFE	SAFE	SAFE	SAFE	SAFE	ELIM				Guest
Benze Diva	SAFE	SAFE	SAFE	BTM	ELIM					Miss C
Shortgun	BTM	SAFE	SAFE	ELIM						Guest
Kara Might	SAFE	SAFE	ELIM							Guest
Srirasha Hotsauce	BTM	ELIM								Guest

== Lip syncs ==
Legend:

The contestant was eliminated after their first time in the bottom.
The contestant was eliminated after their second time in the bottom.
The contestant was eliminated after their third time in the bottom.
The contestant won the Lip Sync for the Crown and was declared the winner of the season.

Episode	Contestants			Song	Eliminated
1	Shortgun	vs.	Srirasha Hotsauce	"ผีเสื้อราตรี" (2002 Ratree)	None
2	Spicy Sunshine	vs.	Srirasha Hotsauce	"บุ๋ง" (Maria Lynn Ehren)	Srirasha Hotsauce
3	Kara Might	vs.	Spicy Sunshine	"ฟ้ารักพ่อ (DILF)" (Badmixy ft. Yui Yardyer)	Kara Might
4	Benze Diva	vs.	Shortgun	"Condragulations" (RuPaul)	Shortgun
5	Benze Diva	vs.	Gigi Ferocious	"Burning for You" (Kratae R-Siam)	Benze Diva
6	Gigi Ferocious	vs.	Siam Phusri	"We Are Beautiful" (Silvy)	Siam Phusri
7	Gigi Ferocious	vs.	Nane Sphera	"Music Lover" (Marsha Vadhanapanich)	Gigi Ferocious
8	Nane Sphera	vs.	Spicy Sunshine	"Call Me Mother" (RuPaul)	Nane Sphera
9	Spicy Sunshine	vs.	Zepee	"ร (W8)" (Gene Kasidit)	None
Episode	Final contestants			Song	Winner
10	Frankie Wonga	vs.	Zepee	"ประวัติศาสตร์" (Christina Aguilar)	Frankie Wonga

== Guest judges ==
Listed in chronological order:

- Rhatha Phongam, actress and singer
- Maria Lynn Ehren, actress and model
- Badmixy, singer
- Paolo Ballesteros, Filipino actor, comedian and host of Drag Race Philippines
- Title Kittiphak, actor, director and screenwriter
- Cindy Bishop, model and actress
- Mintita Wattanakul, actress and singer
- Silvy Pavida, singer
- Kanticha Chumma, actress and model
- Eyeta, social media personality
- Nicky Doll, contestant on the twelfth season of RuPaul's Drag Race and host of Drag Race France
- Pa-Tue, fashion designer
- Christina Aguilar, singer

=== Special guests ===
Guests who appeared in episodes, but did not judge on the main stage.

Episode 1:

- Surachai Saengsuwan, photographer

Episode 10:

- Angele Anang, winner of the second season of Drag Race Thailand
- Maya B'Haro, Miss Congeniality of the second season of Drag Race Thailand

== Episodes ==
No. overall	No. in season	Title	Original release date
22	1	"Thai Tea Is Back Back Back Again"	16 October 2024
Eleven new queens enter the workroom. For the first mini-challenge, the queens do a Thai Tea photoshoot. Spicy Sunshine wins the mini-challenge. For the main challenge, the queens perform a talent in the Talent Show Phenomenon.: Benze Diva - Apsara dance; Frankie Wonga - Comedy performance; Gawdland - Lip-syncing; Gigi Ferocious - Dancing; Kara Might - Comedy performance; Nane Sphera - Original song; Shortgun - Comedy performance; Siam Phusri - Comedy performance; Spicy Sunshine - Original song; Srirasha Hotsauce - Belly dancing; Zepee - Original song; On the runway, category is World Wide Wet. Frankie Wonga, Kara Might and Spicy Sunshine receive positive critiques, with Frankie Wonga winning the challenge. Shortgun, Siam Phusri and Srirasha Hotsauce receive negative critiques, with Siam Phusri being safe. Shortgun and Srirasha Hotsauce lip-sync to "ผีเสื้อราตรี" by 2002 Ratree. Both queens win the lip-sync and no one goes home.: Guest Judge: Rhatha Phongam; Mini-Challenge: Thai Tea Photoshoot; Mini-Challenge Winner: Spicy Sunshine; Mini-Challenge Prize: A ฿12,000 cash tip courtesy of Karun; Main Challenge: Perform a talent in the Talent Show Phenomenon; Runway Theme: World Wide Wet; Challenge Winner: Frankie Wonga; Challenge Prize: A ฿50,000 cash tip; Bottom Two: Shortgun and Srirasha Hotsauce; Lip-Sync Song: "ผีเสื้อราตรี" by 2002 Ratree; Eliminated: None
23	2	"The Pageant Ball"	23 October 2024
For this week's mini-challenge, the queens play a traditional game of Ree Ree Khaosan. Nane Sphera wins the mini-challenge. For the main challenge, the queens create three looks for The Pageant Ball: Swimsuit Outta-Space, Thai-Turistic and ET-Vening Gown in the Universe. On the runway, Benze Diva, Nane Sphera and Zepee receive positive critiques, with Nane Sphera winning the challenge. Gawdland, Spicy Sunshine and Srirasha Hotsauce receive negative critiques, with Gawdland being safe. Spicy Sunshine and Srirasha Hotsauce lip-sync to "บุ๋ง" by Maria Lynn Ehren. Spicy Sunshine wins the lip-sync and Srirasha Hotsauce is the first queen to sashay away.: Guest Judge: Maria Lynn Ehren; Mini-Challenge: Ree Ree Khaosan; Mini-Challenge Winner: Nane Sphera; Mini-Challenge Prize: A ฿12,000 cash tip; Main Challenge: The Pageant Ball; Runway Theme: Swimsuit Outta-Space, Thai-Turistic and ET-Vening Gown in the Universe; Challenge Winner: Nane Sphera; Challenge Prize: A ฿50,000 cash tip; Bottom Two: Spicy Sunshine and Srirasha Hotsauce; Lip-Sync Song: "บุ๋ง" by Maria Lynn Ehren; Eliminated: Srirasha Hotsauce; Farewell Message: "From Heart to every queen. รักพี่ซันมากนะคะ ฝากทำหน้าที่ต่อด้วย" ("From Heart to every queen. I love you so much, P'Sun. Please continue your duty for us")
24	3	"Dig Mountain Music Fiercetival"	30 October 2024
For this week's mini-challenge, the queens perform a rap dressed as grandmas. Benze Diva and Frankie Wonga win the mini-challenge. For the main challenge, the queens write, record, and perform verses to "Sip Sip Sip".: Team Gurlden Flowers: Benze Diva, Gigi Ferocious, Nane Sphera, Siam Phusri and Zepee; Team Mean Gays: Frankie Wonga, Gawdland, Kara Might, Shortgun and Spicy Sunshine; On the runway, category is I Don't Need a Sugar Daddy, I AM a Sugar Daddy! Team "Gurlden Flowers" is the winning team, with Zepee winning the challenge. Team "Mean Gays" is the losing team. Kara Might, Shortgun and Spicy Sunshine receive negative critiques, with Shortgun being safe. Kara Might and Spicy Sunshine lip-sync to "ฟ้ารักพ่อ (DILF)" by Badmixy ft. Yui Yardyer. Spicy Sunshine wins the lip-sync and Kara Might sashays away.: Guest Judges: Badmixy and Paolo Ballesteros; Mini-Challenge: Perform a rap dressed as grandmas; Mini-Challenge Winners: Benze Diva and Frankie Wonga; Mini-Challenge Prize: A ฿12,000 cash tip; Main Challenge: Write, record, and perform verses to "Sip Sip Sip"; Runway Theme: I Don't Need a Sugar Daddy, I AM a Sugar Daddy!; Challenge Winner: Zepee; Challenge Prize: A ฿50,000 cash tip; Bottom Two: Kara Might and Spicy Sunshine; Lip-Sync Song: "ฟ้ารักพ่อ (DILF)" by Badmixy ft. Yui Yardyer; Eliminated: Kara Might; Farewell Message: "Thank you So f*ing Much. This is not the LAST of me. Have fun cleaning this mother f*ing mess!!! I'm gonna miss you guys! Spicy you better win. I got send...Sorry 555...home by the winner"
25	4	"Acting Is Not Acting, Isn't It?"	6 November 2024
For this week's mini-challenge, the queens do a Glamakorn photoshoot. Nane Sphera wins the mini-challenge. For the main challenge, the queens act in the soap opera "บ้าน หลัก โลก เลิศ รูด ลาย ลาย ไทย และ ลุ้น" (The House of Excellent Swipes and Loonies).: Benze Diva plays Pojanee; Frankie Wonga plays Daddy; Gawdland plays Catherine; Gigi Ferocious plays Son; Nane Sphera plays Guitar; Shortgun plays Yaya; Siam Phusri plays Keraati; Spicy Sunshine plays Pojanoi; Zepee plays Phopnapa; On the runway, category is Hat the Way I Like It. Frankie Wonga, Siam Phusri and Zepee receive positive critiques, with Zepee winning the challenge. Benze Diva, Nane Sphera and Shortgun receive negative critiques, with Nane Sphera being safe. Benze Diva and Shortgun lip-sync to "Condragulations" by RuPaul. Benze Diva wins the lip-sync and Shortgun sashays away.: Guest Judge: Title Kittiphak; Mini-Challenge: Glamakorn Photoshoot; Mini-Challenge Winner: Nane Sphera; Mini-Challenge Prize: A ฿12,000 cash tip; Main Challenge: Act in the soap opera "บ้าน หลัก โลก เลิศ รูด ลาย ลาย ไทย และ ลุ้น" (The House of Excellent Swipes and Loonies); Runway Theme: Hat the Way I Like It; Challenge Winner: Zepee; Challenge Prize: A ฿50,000 cash tip; Bottom Two: Benze Diva and Shortgun; Lip-Sync Song: "Condragulations" by RuPaul; Eliminated: Shortgun; Farewell Message: "S-H-O-R-T-G-U-N that's me. จำไว้นะคะ อีหน้าขาว ไม่ใช่กูแล้วใครจะทำ ยังไม่จบนะคะ เจอแน่ ALL STARS" (S-H-O-R-T-G-U-N that's me. Remember me, the white-faced makeup bitch. Who would do it if it's not me? This is not over yet. See you on ALL STARS)
26	5	"Snatch Game"	13 November 2024
For this week's mini-challenge, the queens read each other to filth. Gawdland wins the mini-challenge. For the main challenge, the queens play the Snatch Game. Cindy Bishop and Metinee Kingpayome star as the celebrity contestants. The cast consisted of: Benze Diva as Marilyn Monroe; Frankie Wonga as Aang Terdterng; Gawdland as Bryan Tan; Gigi Ferocious as Rihanna; Nane Sphera as Chao Korkaew; Siam Phusri as Pumpuang Duangjan; Spicy Sunshine as Pa Tue; Zepee as Tik Klinsee; On the runway, category is Clown is Sexy and I Know It. Gawdland and Spicy Sunshine receive positive critiques, with Spicy Sunshine winning the challenge. Benze Diva, Gigi Ferocious and Siam Phusri receive negative critiques, with Siam Phusri being safe. Benze Diva and Gigi Ferocious lip-sync to "Burning for You" by Kratae R-Siam. Gigi Ferocious wins the lip-sync and Benze Diva sashays away.: Guest Judge: Cindy Bishop; Mini-Challenge: Reading is Fundamental; Mini-Challenge Winner: Gawdland; Mini-Challenge Prize: A ฿12,000 cash tip; Main Challenge: Snatch Game; Runway Theme: Clown is Sexy and I Know It; Challenge Winner: Spicy Sunshine; Challenge Prize: A ฿50,000 cash tip; Bottom Two: Benze Diva and Gigi Ferocious; Lip-Sync Song: "Burning for You" by Kratae R-Siam; Eliminated: Benze Diva; Farewell Message: "ถึงลูกๆ ไม่ต้องเสียใจนะ แม่ยังไม่ตาย สู้ ๆ รักนะทุกคน Call me Mother! Love มาก ๆ" (To all my kids, let's not be sad. I'm not dead yet. Keep on fighting. Call me Mother! Love you all.)
27	6	"Hunter, Lover, Mother?"	20 November 2024
For this week's mini-challenge, the queens do an ASMR Mukbang. Gawdland wins the mini-challenge. For the main challenge, the queens perform in Kraitong: The Rusical.: Frankie Wonga plays Ann; Gawdland plays Mangkut; Gigi Ferocious plays Pancake; Nane Sphera plays Ying; Siam Phusri plays Koko; Spicy Sunshine plays Helen; Zepee plays Lina; On the runway, category is Love is Blind. Gawdland, Nane Sphera and Zepee receive positive critiques, with Gawdland winning the challenge. Gigi Ferocious and Siam Phusri receive negative critiques, and are announced as the bottom two. They lip-sync to "We Are Beautiful" by Silvy. Gigi Ferocious wins the lip-sync and Siam Phusri sashays away.: Guest Judges: Mintita Wattanakul and Silvy Pavida; Mini-Challenge: ASMR Mukbang; Mini-Challenge Winner: Gawdland; Mini-Challenge Prize: A ฿12,000 cash tip; Main Challenge: Kraitong: The Rusical; Runway Theme: Love is Blind; Challenge Winner: Gawdland; Challenge Prize: A ฿50,000 cash tip; Bottom Two: Gigi Ferocious and Siam Phusri; Lip-Sync Song: "We Are Beautiful" by Silvy; Eliminated: Siam Phusri; Farewell Message: "Love you all. ยินดีที่ได้รู้จัก. ~Siam Phusri" (Love you all. Nice to meet you. ~Siam Phusri)
28	7	"Yes, and..."	27 November 2024
For this week's mini-challenge, the queens perform multiple wig reveals. Nane Sphera wins the mini-challenge. For the main challenge, the queens pair up and improvise in the game show "Dubble Trubble".: Frankie Wonga and Spicy Sunshine - Cheat Pray Love; Gawdland and Gigi Ferocious - Love at First Strut; Nane Sphera and Zepee - Ze-Ne News; On the runway, category is The Iconic. Frankie Wonga and Spicy Sunshine receive positive critiques, with Frankie Wonga winning the challenge. Gawdland, Gigi Ferocious and Nane Sphera receive negative critiques, with Gawdland being safe. Gigi Ferocious and Nane Sphera lip-sync to "Music Lover" by Marsha Vadhanapanich. Nane Sphera wins the lip-sync and Gigi Ferocious sashays away.: Guest Judge: Kanticha Chumma; Mini-Challenge: Perform multiple wig reveals; Mini-Challenge Winner: Nane Sphera; Mini-Challenge Prize: A ฿12,000 cash tip; Main Challenge: In pairs, improvise in the game show "Dubble Trubble"; Runway Theme: The Iconic; Challenge Winner: Frankie Wonga; Challenge Prize: A ฿50,000 cash tip; Bottom Two: Gigi Ferocious and Nane Sphera; Lip-Sync Song: "Music Lover" by Marsha Vadhanapanich; Eliminated: Gigi Ferocious; Farewell Message: "Thank you so much for everything. สู้ต่อไปทุกคน This is me, Gigi Ferocious." (Thank you so much for everything. Keep fighting, everybody. This is me, Gigi Ferocious)
29	8	"Makeover With Pride"	4 December 2024
For this week's mini-challenge, the queens have a bitchfest with puppets. Spicy Sunshine wins the mini-challenge. For the main challenge, the queens makeover queer people from Bangkok Pride. On the runway, category is Mother-Daughter, Feather Together. Frankie Wonga and Gawdland receive positive critiques, with Gawdland winning the challenge. Nane Sphera, Spicy Sunshine and Zepee receive negative critiques, with Zepee being safe. Nane Sphera and Spicy Sunshine lip-sync to "Call Me Mother" by RuPaul. Spicy Sunshine wins the lip-sync and Nane Sphera sashays away.: Guest Judges: Eyeta and Nicky Doll; Mini-Challenge: Everybody Loves Puppets; Mini-Challenge Winner: Spicy Sunshine; Mini-Challenge Prize: A ฿12,000 cash tip; Main Challenge: Makeover queer people from Bangkok Pride; Runway Theme: Mother-Daughter, Feather Together; Challenge Winner: Gawdland; Challenge Prize: Gift Vouchers from SLC worth ฿130,000; Bottom Two: Nane Sphera and Spicy Sunshine; Lip-Sync Song: "Call Me Mother" by RuPaul; Eliminated: Nane Sphera; Farewell Message:
30	9	"Tea V Show"	11 December 2024
For this week's mini-challenge, the queens twerk on the most lemons while blindfolded. Frankie Wonga wins the mini-challenge. For the main challenge, the queens write and record an episode for their own talk show.: Frankie Wonga - Khun Na Party, Tonight (Aunty's Tonight Party); Gawdland - Back in Your Childhood with Little Gawdland; Spicy Sunshine - Tarm Tai Lifestyle; Zepee - Kuy Sao Kuy Siew (Tell 'N Talk Thrilling); On the runway, category is Hair. Frankie Wonga and Gawdland receive positive critiques, with Frankie Wonga winning the challenge. Spicy Sunshine and Zepee receive negative critiques, and are announced as the bottom two. They lip-sync to "ร (W8)" by Gene Kasidit. Both queens win the lip-sync and no one goes home.: Guest Judge: Pa-Tue; Mini-Challenge: Twerk on the most lemons while blindfolded; Mini-Challenge Winner: Frankie Wonga; Mini-Challenge Prize: A ฿12,000 cash tip; Main Challenge: Write and record an episode for your own talk show; Runway Theme: Hair; Challenge Winner: Frankie Wonga; Challenge Prize: A ฿50,000 cash tip courtesy of Anastasia Beverly Hills Cosmetics; Bottom Two: Spicy Sunshine and Zepee; Lip-Sync Song: "ร (W8)" by Gene Kasidit; Eliminated: None
31	10	"Grand Finale"	18 December 2024
For the final challenge of the season, the queens star and perform in a music video for RuPaul's song "Bring Back My Girls". On the runway, category is Queen of All Queens. The eliminated queens all return to the runway, where it is announced that Benze Diva is this season's Miss Congeniality. Gawdland and Spicy Sunshine are eliminated, leaving Frankie Wonga and Zepee as the top two queens of the season. They lip-sync to "ประวัติศาสตร์" by Christina Aguilar. It is announced that Frankie Wonga is the winner, leaving Zepee as the runner-up.: Guest Judge: Christina Aguilar; Main Challenge: Star and perform in a music video for RuPaul's song "Bring Back My Girls"; Runway Theme: Queen of All Queens; Miss Congeniality: Benze Diva; Eliminated: Gawdland and Spicy Sunshine; Top Two: Frankie Wonga and Zepee; Lip-Sync Song: "ประวัติศาสตร์" by Christina Aguilar; Runner-up: Zepee; Winner of Drag Race Thailand Season Three: Frankie Wonga
