= Gawdland =

Thai drag performer

- ก็อตแลนด์
- Born: Tharathep Thaweephon (ธราเทพ ทวีผล); 15 January 2002 (age 24); Lamphun, Thailand
- Occupation: Drag queen
- Television: Drag Race Thailand (season 3); RuPaul's Drag Race: UK vs. the World (series 3)

Gawdland is the stage name of Tharathep Thaweephon (born 15 January 2002), a Thai drag performer. They are most known for competing on the third season of Drag Race Thailand and winning the third series of RuPaul's Drag Race: UK vs. the World.

== Early life and career ==
Tharathep Thaweephon was born and raised in Lamphun and later moved to study in Chiang Mai. They began performing in drag after moving to Bangkok to attend university. They gradually taught themselves to speak English by consuming Western media such as RuPaul's Drag Race. Thaweephon earned a bachelor's degree in journalism from Chulalongkorn University.

Their stage name is derived from their first name Tharathep's English translation, "who is God of the land". In 2023, Gawdland appeared in Troye Sivan's music video "Got Me Started". In 2024, Gawdland was announced as part of the cast of Drag Race Thailand season 3, in which they won the "Rusical" and makeover challenges, ultimately placing 3rd/4th. In 2026, they were announced as part of the cast of the third series of RuPaul's Drag Race: UK vs. the World. Gawdland went on to win the series, being only the second international queen ever to be crowned by RuPaul herself. Her winning the series granted her a prize of £50,000 British pound sterlings, which converts to over ฿2.1 million Thai Baht, her nation’s currency.

== Personal life ==
Gawdland uses they/them pronouns in drag and he/him pronouns out of drag.

== Filmography ==
=== Television ===
Year	Title	Role	Notes
2024	Drag Race Thailand (season 3)	Contestant	3rd place
2026	RuPaul's Drag Race: UK vs. the World (series 3)	Contestant	Winner

=== Music Videos ===
Year	Title	Artist	Director
2026	Gawdland - Firecracker (Official Video)	Self	Jattawa

== Discography ==
=== Singles ===
Year	Title
2026	Firecracker
2026	Firecracker (RuRuVision Song Contest)
