= Tia Kofi =

British drag performer

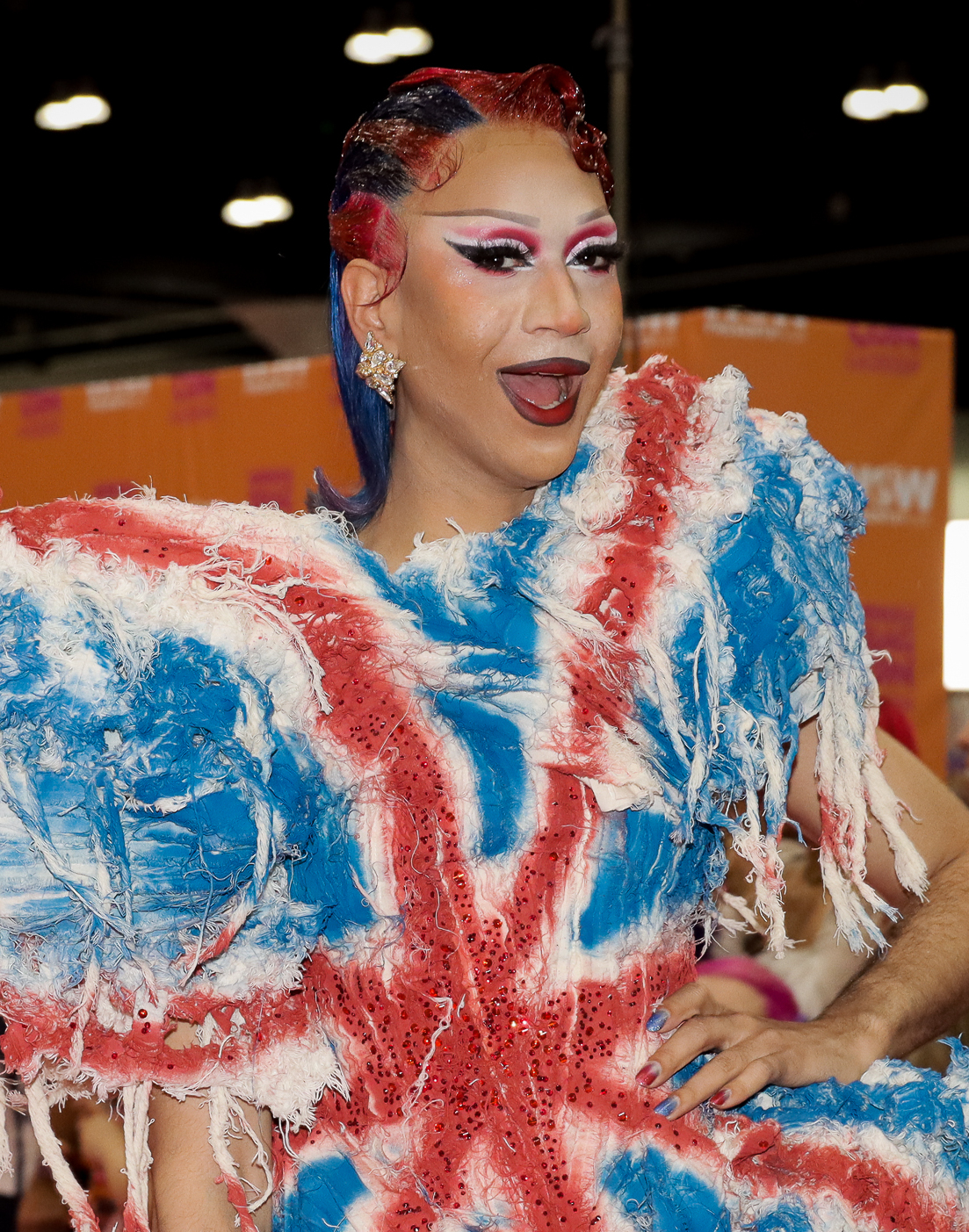
- Tia Kofi at RuPaul's DragCon LA, 2024
- Born: Lawrence John Bolton; 27 September 1990 (age 36); Essex, England, UK
- Occupations: Drag queen, singer
- Years active: 2014–present
- Television: RuPaul's Drag Race UK (series 2); RuPaul's Drag Race: UK vs. the World (series 2)
- Partner: Pixie Polite (former)

Lawrence John Bolton (born 27 September 1990), better known by the stage name Tia Kofi, is a British drag queen and singer from Clapham, South London. They are best known for competing on the second series of RuPaul's Drag Race UK (2021), and winning the second series of RuPaul's Drag Race: UK vs. the World (2024).

== Early life ==
Bolton was born in Essex to a Nigerian mother (d. 2022) and a British father who met at university. They attended the University of Nottingham, but did not graduate.

== Career ==
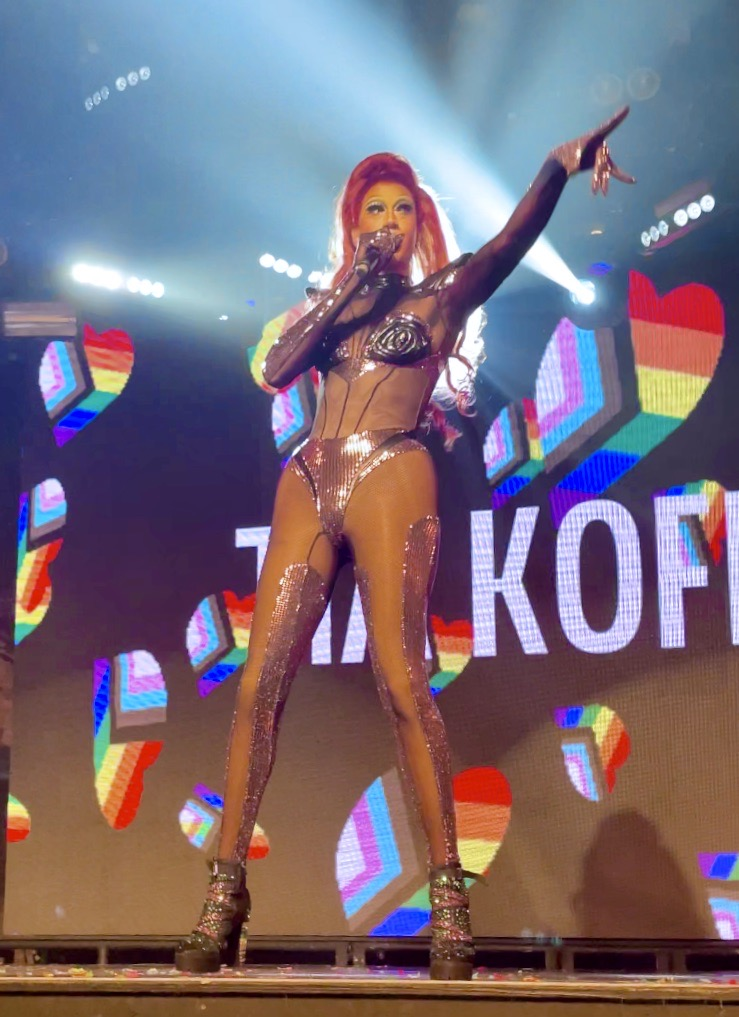
Tia Kofi performing in 2022

Tia Kofi began their career as a drag queen in 2014, when she started drag on the same day and at the same venue as series 1 contestant Sum Ting Wong. Her name is a play on the phrase "tea or coffee?", and as part of their initial entrance confessional, Tia Kofi confirmed that they'd named themself after Tia Mowry from American sitcom Sister Sister and former Secretary-General of the United Nations, Kofi Annan. Prior to competing on the second series of RuPaul's Drag Race UK, Tia Kofi frequently performed in venues across South London, predominantly in Clapham.

Tia Kofi is a part of a drag girl-group called The Vixens consisting of Kofi, Pixie Polite and Woe Addams. In December 2020, Tia Kofi was announced as one of twelve contestants competing on the second series of RuPaul's Drag Race UK. After lip synching three times, she ultimately placed seventh overall.

In February 2021, shortly after their elimination from Drag Race, Kofi released their debut single "Outside In" (co-written by Little Boots, Tom Aspaul and Gil Lewis), as well as a music video on 24 February 2021. In May 2021, Tia Kofi performed alongside series 1 winner The Vivienne, and fellow series 2 contestant Veronica Green at the Vaudeville Theatre in "Drag Queens of Pop", which was one of the first performances on the West End after the third national COVID-19 lockdown in England.

In February 2022, Tia Kofi embarked on RuPaul's Drag Race UK: The Official Tour alongside the entire cast of series 2, in association with World of Wonder and promoter Voss Events. Her set consisted of "Outside In" followed by "Don't Start Now" by Dua Lipa and "No Way" from the musical Six. In May 2023, Tia Kofi released their third EP, Pride. Power. Pop. and single "Standing Up for the Lonely" She played the digital assistant ALGO in the second series of "Olga Koch: OK Computer" on BBC Radio 4 from May 2023.

In January 2024, Tia Kofi was announced as one of the contestants competing on series 2 of RuPaul's Drag Race: UK vs. the World. She later went on to win the series and be crowned "Queen of the Mothertucking World". Subsequently, she took home the first-ever cash prize in the shows history: £50,000.

On 5 May 2024, Tia Kofi co-hosted the opening "Turquoise Carpet" event of the Eurovision Song Contest 2024 alongside Swedish drag queen Elecktra. On 12 Dec 2024, Tia Kofi was a co-presenter and backstage interviewer of acts at the 2024 Het Grote Songfestivalfeest concert in Amsterdam.

== Political views ==
In 2025, Bolton expressed support for the Green Party and praised London Assembly Member and Party Leader, Zack Polanski. In October 2025, they stated their intention to seek to stand for elected office for the Green Party.

== Personal life ==
Bolton dated fellow The Vixens member Pixie Polite for approximately five years.

Tia Kofi is the "drag mother" of Victoria Scone.

== Filmography ==
=== Film ===
Year	Title	Role	Notes	Ref
2004	Harry Potter and the Prisoner of Azkaban	Hufflepuff student	Background actor	

=== Television ===
Year	Title	Role	Notes	Ref
2021	RuPaul's Drag Race UK	Contestant	Series 2	
2021	Celebrity Gogglebox	Themself	Black to Front Special (alongside Tayce)	
2021	Children in Need 2021	Themself	Guest appearance	
2021	Be Here, Be Queer	Themself	Netflix special	
2022	Eating with My Ex	Themself	Celebrity special	
2022	Celebrity Catchpoint	Themself	Special guest	
2022	Celebrity Lingo	Themself	Guest	
2022	Bring Back My Girls	Themself	Guest	
2024	RuPaul's Drag Race: UK vs. the World	Contestant/Winner	Series 2	
2025	Dear Viv	Themself	Interviewee	
2026	Heartstopper Forever: The Official Podcast	Themself	Host	

=== Music videos ===
Year	Title	Artist	Ref
2017	"Gotta Get a Grip"	Mick Jagger	
2021	"My House"	Jodie Harsh	
2021	"Outside In"	Tia Kofi	
2021	"Look What You've Done"	Tia Kofi & Cahill	
2021	"Loving Me Like That"	Tia Kofi	
2021	"Jingle Bell Rock"	The Vivienne & Tia Kofi	
2022	"Get Better"	Tia Kofi	
2022	"So Good"	Tia Kofi	

=== Internet series ===
Year	Title	Role	Notes	Ref(s)
2021	I Like to Watch UK	Guest	Produced by Netflix	
2022	Eating with My Ex	Guest	Produced by BBC Three	
2022	Little Rants	Guest	Produced by Funny Parts	
2022	Tea Time	Host	Produced by Attitude Magazine	

== Discography ==
=== Albums ===
Title	Details
Read My Lips	Release: March 2024; Label: Intention; Format: Digital download, streaming, vinyl

=== Extended plays ===
Title	Details
Part 1: The Damage	Released: September 2, 2021; Label: Intention; Format: Digital download, streaming
Part 2: The Antidote	Released: July 1, 2022; Label: Intention; Format: Digital download, streaming
Pride. Power. Pop.	Released: May 26, 2023; Label: Intention; Format: Digital download, streaming

=== Singles ===
Title	Year	Album
"Outside In"	2021	Part 1: The Damage
"Look What You've Done" (with Cahill)	2021	Part 1: The Damage
"Loving Me Like That"	2021	Part 1: The Damage
"I Want It All"	2021	Part 1: The Damage
"Jingle Bell Rock" (with The Vivienne)	2021	Non-album single
"Get Better"	2022	Part 2: The Antidote
"Heart Beating" with MRSHLL	2022	Part 2: The Antidote
"I Specialise in Love"	2022	Non-album single
"So Good"	2022	Pride. Power. Pop.
"Standing Up for the Lonely"	2023	Pride. Power. Pop.
"Maybe It's You"	2023	Non-album single
"Guest List"	2023	Non-album single
"Lonely This Christmas"	2023	Non-album single
"Read My Lips"	2024	Read My Lips

=== As featured artist ===
Title	Year	Album
"UK Hun?" The Cast of RuPaul's Drag Race UK (Bananadrama Version)	2021	Non-album single
"Heart Beating" (with MRSHLL)	2022	Non-album single
"Your Light Will Shine" (with Bimini, Ellis Miah, Bentley Robles, Eden Hunter & Janethan)	2025	Non-album single

== Stage ==
Year	Title	Promoter	Locations	Ref
2021	Drag Queens of Pop	Nimax Theatres	Vaudeville Theatre	
2022	RuPaul's Drag Race UK: The Official Tour	Voss Events / World of Wonder	Ipswich, Oxford, Edinburgh, Glasgow, Newcastle, Nottingham, Bournemouth, Southend, Manchester, Sheffield, Blackpool, Llandudno, Birmingham, Cardiff, Liverpool, Basingstoke, Portsmouth, Plymouth, London, Derby, Bristol, Bradford, Aberdeen, Southampton, Stockton, Brighton and Newport	
2024	RuPaul's Drag Race UK vs The World: The Official Tour	Voss Events / World of Wonder	Glasgow, Newcastle, Manchester, Leeds, Edinburgh, Bristol, London and Bournemouth	
