= Kratae R-Siam =

Thai singer, model and boxer

- กระแต อาร์สยาม
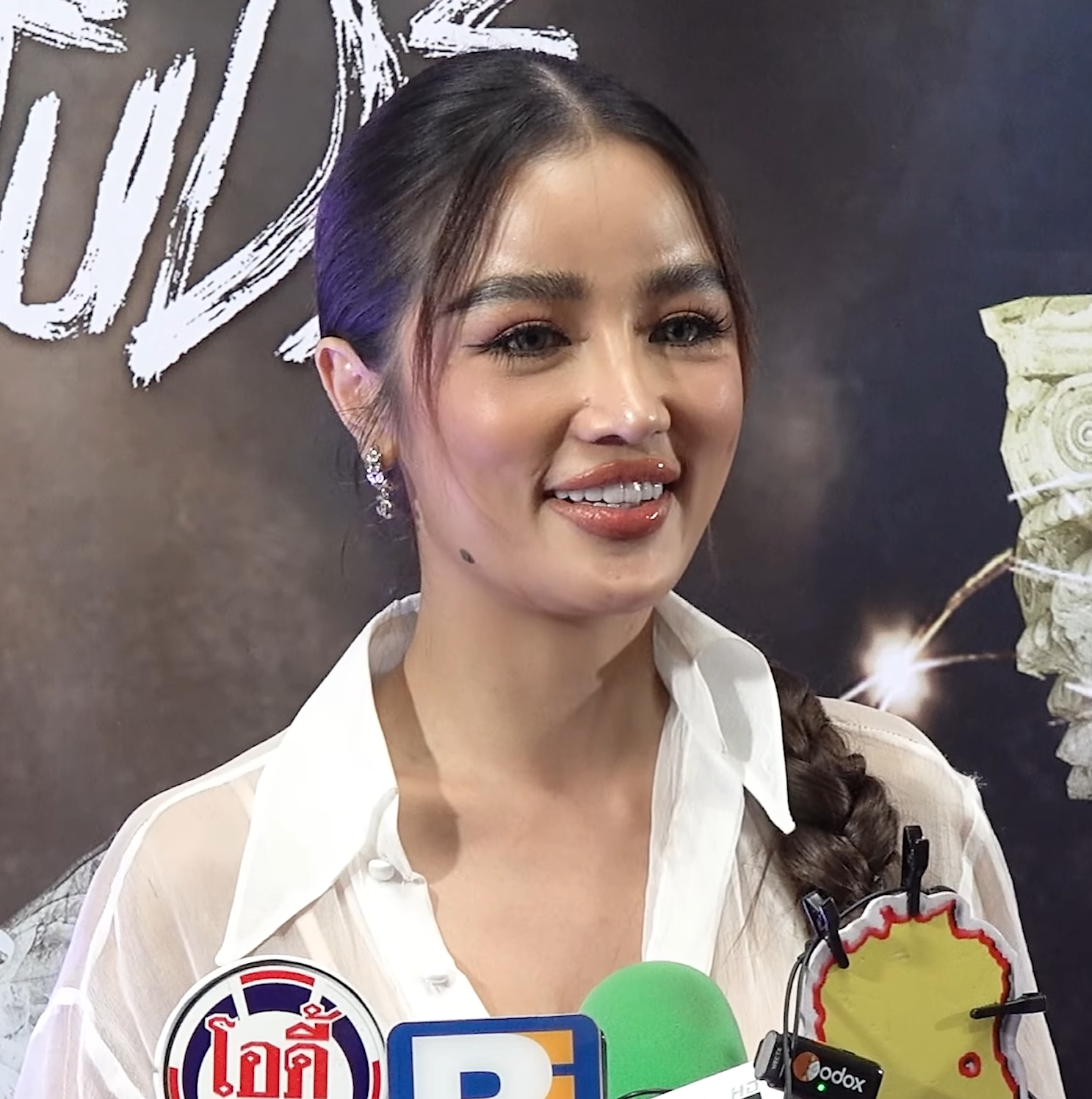
- Born: Nipaporn Boonyalieng; 25 August 1987 (age 38); Hang Chat, Lampang, Thailand
- Occupations: Singer; model; boxer; businesswoman; actress; MC; YouTubers; television personality
- Years active: 2003–present
- Musical career
- Genres: Thai-pop; Luk thung; dance
- Label: R-Siam
- Website: Instagram

Nipaporn Boonyaliang(born Nipaporn Paeng-Ouan; August 25, 1987), better known by the stage name Kratae R-Siam (Thai: กระแต อาร์ สยาม), is a Thai luk thung singer under the R-Siam label. She also has a background in Muay Thai and adheres to Buddhism.

== Education ==
She graduated in Bachelor of Architecture from Sri Pathum University.

== Career ==
Kratae is well known for her prowess as a muay thai boxer and a pop singer. Her style is Lanna which is northern Thai and is different from more traditional Isaarn luuk thoong style. She has recorded and released several albums including best albums (compilation) on the Rsiam label. She is primarily successful in Asian countries (especially Thailand, Cambodia, Japan, China and Taiwan), but she has also performed in Belgium and France.

At the beginning of 2026, she created a phenomenon when her international single Bangkok City, which highlights the beauty and charm of Bangkok, went viral. It sparked a trend in which young people wore traditional Thai sabai on their upper body while pairing it with jeans on the lower half, visiting and taking photos at various tourist attractions such as Thai temples, just as shown in the MV. This became a movement that helped promote Thailand's soft power, similar to Lisa's Rockstar phenomenon in 2024.

== Discography ==
=== Loog Thung 4 teens ===
The music group's debut album, ลูกทุ่ง 4 ทีน was released on 10 December 2003.

The album contains twelve songs :-

1. "Yim leaw ruey" (ยิ้มแล้วรวย)
2. "Mai dai tung jai dum" (ไม่ได้ตั้งใจดำ)
3. "Bun ya kard nah mee fan" (บรรยากาศน่ามีแฟน)
4. "Sao nong po" (สาวหนองโพ)
5. "Por mee tae hai" (พ่อมีแต่ให้)
6. "Ar deed ruk barn nah" (อดีตรักบ้านนา)
7. "Nu suey mai" (หนูสวยไหม)
8. "Sao tub kla dard" (สาวทับกระดาน)
9. "Ruk kong mong" (รักคนมอง)
10. "Jai troong gun" (ใจตรงกัน)
11. "Look sib lor" (ลูกสิบล้อ)
12. "Puer mae" (เพื่อแม่)

=== Perd Jai Sao Tae ===
"Her solo second album, เปิดใจสาวแต, 3 years after the first one, was released on 22 January 2007. The ten songs on this album are:-

1. "Ror narn narn torraman jai" (รอนานนานทรมานใจ)
2. "Perd jai sao tae" (เปิดใจสาวแต)
3. "Mai mee mue tue" (ไม่มีมือถือ)
4. "Remote hua jai" (รีโมทหัวใจ)
5. "Mah nhoo du" (หมาหนูดุ)
6. "Tai rom prabaramee" (ใต้ร่มพระบารมี)
7. "Ber krai" (เบอร์ใคร)
8. "Kae kum bork lar" (แค่คำบอกลา)
9. "Mai pluem" (ไม่ปลื้ม)
10. "For fan mai mee" (ฟ. แฟนไม่มี)

=== Khong Kwan Jark Sao Tae ===
The third album, was released on 19 December 2007. The ten songs on this album are:-

1. "Aor bor tor boon mar" (อบต. บุญมา)
2. "Phai wah nong jai choo" (ไผว่าน้องเจ้าชู้)
3. "Khong kwan tee nong khor" (ของขวัญที่น้องขอ)
4. "Mar lah woey" (มาละเหวย)
5. "Kid tueng" (คิดถึง)
6. "Diew mae tee tai" (เดี๋ยวแม่ตีตาย)
7. "Khao mee dee arai" (เขามีดีอะไร)
8. "Nae jai mhai pee" (แน่ใจไหมพี่)
9. "Sao lumpang" (สาวลำปาง)
10. "Sia dai" (เสียดาย)

=== Sao Kard Laeng ===
Sao Kard Laeng, her 4th album, was released on 29 October 2008. The ten songs on this album are:-

1. "Jarng mun ter" (จ้างมันเต๊อะ)
2. "Sawasdee kwam ngao" (สวัสดีความเหงา)
3. "Sao kard laeng" (สาวกาดแลง)
4. "Ja ya ja dai" (จะยะจะได)
5. "Chong ya mong" (ชงยาหม่อง)
6. "Bork ma luey" (บอกมาเลย)
7. "Kum warn korn norn" (คำหวานก่อนนอน)
8. "La orn" (ละอ่อน)
9. "Pah ched nah" (ผ้าเช็คหน้า)
10. "Sakid thom sao" (สะกิดต่อมสาว)

=== Tee Kao Kayao Dance ===
This album is a cooperation of Kratae and Kratay, a sister of Kratae, was released on 27 January 2010. The ten songs on this album are:-

1. "Yarng nee tong tee kao" (อย่างนี้ต้องตีเข่า)
2. "Dek pump" (เด็กปั๊ม)
3. "Sao rum wong" (สาวรำวง)
4. "Pok mia ma duay" (พกเมียมาด้วย)
5. "Chorp mai" (ชอบมั้ย)
6. "Ruk rua lom" (รักเรือล่ม)
7. "Mai yark pen praeng see fun" (ไม่อยากเป็นแปรงสีฟัน)
8. "Tob mue karng deaw" (ตบมือข้างเดียว)
9. "Ma ruk tum mai torn nee" (มารักทำไมตอนนี้)
10. "Warng laew chuay tro glub" (ว่างแล้วช่วยโทรกลับ)

=== Ruk Na Chuek Chuek ===
Ruk Na Chuek Chuek, her 6th album, was released on 23 March 2011. The ten songs on this album are:-

1. "Ruk na chuek chuek" (รักนะฉึก ฉึก)
2. "Ber khon oak huk" (เบอร์คนอกหัก)
3. "Nisai bor dee" (นิสัยบ่ดี)
4. "Luem pai wa bor chai fan" (ลืมไปว่าบ่ใช่แฟน)
5. "Lhor ta-lu jai (Jikka duey)" (หล่อทะลุใจ (จิ๊กกะดึ๊ย))
6. "Lamoon lamom" (ละมุนละม่อม)
7. "Arom ying" (อารมณ์หญิง)
8. "Maew huang karng" (แมวหวงก้าง)
9. "Pen ja dai pong ai" (เป็นจะไดผ่องอ้าย)
10. "Pok ka daek" (ป๊อกกะแด็ก)

== Singles ==
- "รักหรือไม่รัก" feat.Dr.Fuu (19 December 2008)
- "ตื๊ด (Tued)" (17 July 2014)
- "ชู้ทางไลน์ (Hidden Line)" feat.Timethai (17 September 2014)
- "เมรี (Meri)" feat.Kratay Rsiam (24 December 2014)
- "ยิ่งถูกทิ้ง ยิ่งต้องสวย (Stay Cool!)" (27 August 2015)
- "สะบัด (Flick)" (14 March 2016)
- "เหวี่ยง (นวดให้นุ่ม) (Strong)" feat.Waii (15 August 2016)
- "รอพี่ที่บ้านนอก" (16 February 2017)
- "หนานะ (Thick)" (1 April 2018)
- "ลื่น (Slip)" (14 December 2018)
- "สาวดอยคอยปื้" (4 September 2019)
- "ดกก้น (Dok Kon)" feat.Pok Mindset (26 September 2022)

== Movies ==
- สวยหมัดสั่ง (Suay Mat Sang) (2011)
- สวยหมัดสั่ง 2 (Suay Mat Sang 2) (2012)
- Look Tung Nguen Laan (2013)

== Dramas ==
- Rachanee Look Toong (Ch.8 2012)
- Like Mat Sang (Ch.8 2015)
- Matcha Anda (Ch.8 2021)

== MC ==
Online

- 2020 : #ตามติดแตร On Air YouTube:KT Kratae
- 2021 : KTทำดีอวดผี On Air YouTube:KT Kratae
