= RuPaul's Drag Race: UK vs. the World =

British reality competition television series (since 2022)

- Genre: Reality competition
- Presented by: RuPaul
- Judges: RuPaul; Michelle Visage; Alan Carr; Graham Norton
- Theme music composer: RuPaul
- Opening theme: RuPaul's Drag Race theme
- Ending theme: "Rock It (To the Moon)"
- Country of origin: United Kingdom
- Original language: English
- No. of series: 3
- No. of episodes: 22

Production
- Executive producers: Bruce McCoy; Sally Sanders; RuPaul Charles; Fenton Bailey; Randy Barbato; Tom Rodriguez
- Producer: Michelle Visage
- Production locations: Manchester Studios (Series 1); Pinewood Studios (Series 2–3)
- Camera setup: Multi-camera
- Running time: 60–70 minutes
- Production company: World of Wonder

Original release
- Network: BBC Three; WOW Presents Plus
- Release: 1 February 2022 – 17 March 2026

Related
- RuPaul's Drag Race UK; Canada's Drag Race: Canada vs. the World; Drag Race Philippines: Slaysian Royale; Drag Race Down Under vs. the World; Drag Race México: Latina Royale

RuPaul's Drag Race: UK vs. the World is an international all-stars series of RuPaul's Drag Race UK and its franchise. The all-stars series premiered on 1 February 2022, through BBC Three and WOW Presents Plus. RuPaul acts as the host, head judge, and executive producer of the series.

The contestants for the first series were announced on 17 January 2022. The first series was won by Blu Hydrangea with Mo Heart as the runner-up. The second series began airing on 9 February 2024 and was won by Tia Kofi with Hannah Conda as the runner-up. The third series began airing on 27 January 2026 and was won by Gawdland with Kate Butch as the runner-up.

== Production ==
On 21 December 2021, a press release by the BBC announced an upcoming international all-stars series involving RuPaul's Drag Race UK; it coincided with the relaunch of BBC Three as a television channel. The first series was filmed in Manchester at the same location as the third series of the main series. The second series was filmed in Pinewood Studios, back-to-back with the fifth series of the main series.

=== Format ===
The first two series follow a similar format from seasons two to four of RuPaul's Drag Race All Stars. In every episode, the two best-performing contestants of the main challenge would compete in the lip-sync. The victor is awarded a golden "RuPeter Badge" and the power to eliminate any of the worst-performing queens from the main challenge. In the finale, the top 4 will battle in a Lip Sync For The Crown tournament to determine the winner.

The third series follow a format similar to the Golden Beaver, as seen on Canada's Drag Race and Canada's Drag Race: Canada vs. the World. In each episode, the best performing queen is awarded a golden "RuPeter Badge" and the power of the Chippy Tea, which the victor can use to save one of the bottom three queens from lip-syncing. The other two queens then lip-sync for their lives, with the loser being eliminated. This continue until six queens remain, at which point the format reverts to the classic Drag Race format, where a winner and a bottom 2 is named by the judges, and the bottom 2 lip-sync for their lives.

=== Judges ===
The competition series is hosted and judged primarily by RuPaul, Michelle Visage as a supporting judge, with Alan Carr and Graham Norton returning as alternating judges.

Judges on RuPaul's Drag Race: UK vs. the World
Judge	Series		
Judge	1	2	3
RuPaul	Main	Main	Main
Michelle Visage	Main	Main	Main
Alan Carr	Main	Main	Main
Graham Norton	Main	Main	Main

== Series overview ==
Series	Contestants	Episodes	Originally released		Winner	Runner-up	Miss Congeniality
Series	Contestants	Episodes	First released	Last released	Winner	Runner-up	Miss Congeniality
1	9	6	1 February 2022	8 March 2022	Blu Hydrangea	Mo Heart	—
2	11	8	9 February 2024	29 March 2024	Tia Kofi	Hannah Conda	Arantxa Castilla-La Mancha
3	10	8	27 January 2026	17 March 2026	Gawdland	Kate Butch	Serena Morena

=== Series 1 (2022) ===
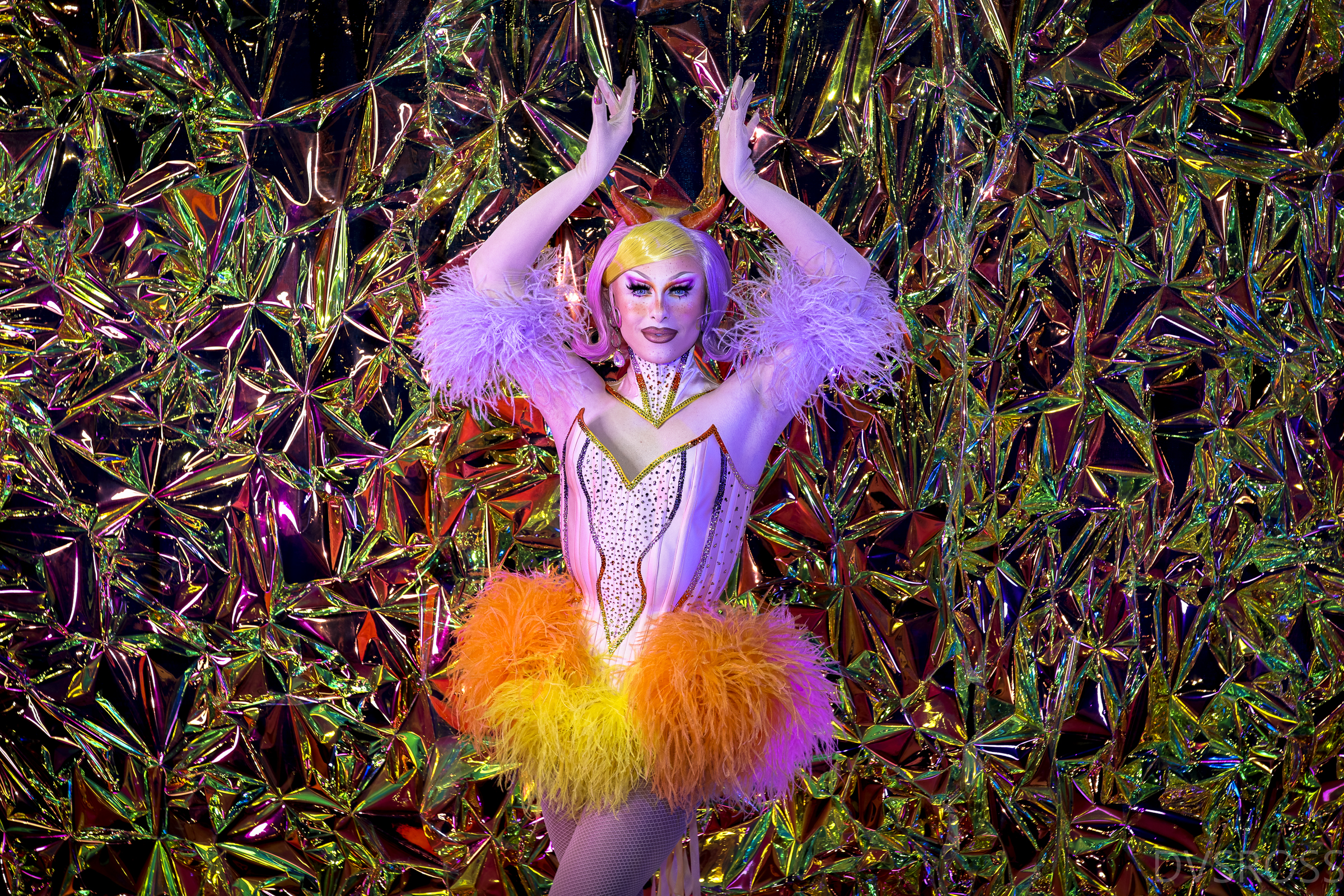
Blu Hydrangea was the first winner of RuPaul's Drag Race: UK vs. the World.

The first series premiered on 1 February 2022, and features nine international queens who have competed in the Drag Race franchise worldwide. The contestants competed to become "Queen of the Mothertucking World" and be featured in a song by RuPaul, as well as winning a crown and a scepter. It ran for six episodes and concluded on 8 March 2022; Mo Heart was the runner-up and Blu Hydrangea was crowned the first series winner.

=== Series 2 (2024) ===
After its two-year hiatus, a teaser was released showcasing the second series of the international all stars. The series aired on BBC Three and iPlayer beginning on 9 February 2024. Tia Kofi was the winner, Hannah Conda was the runner up and Marina Summers and La Grande Dame place third. Arantxa Castilla-La Mancha was voted Miss Congeniality.

=== Series 3 (2026) ===
Following another two-year hiatus, a teaser was released showcasing a third series of the international all stars on 24 December 2025. The series premiered on 27 January 2026. Gawdland was the winner, Kate Butch was the runner up and Fontana and Mariah Balenciaga place third. Serena Morena was voted Miss Congeniality.
