= BBR =

BBR may refer to:

== Arts and entertainment ==
- Bitches brauchen Rap, an album by German rapper Shirin David
- Black Box Recorder, a British band
- The Black Box Revelation, a Belgian alternative rock band
- Boom Boom Rocket, an Xbox video game

== Organisations ==
- Belize Bird Rescue
- Berry Bros. & Rudd, a London-based wine merchant
- Billionaire Boys Racing, a Thai auto racing team
- Broken Bow Records, a country music label

== Technology ==
- Behavior-based robotics
- TCP BBR, a network congestion control algorithm

== Transport ==
- SBA Airlines (ICAO code BBR, 1995–2018), Venezuelan
- Beitbridge Bulawayo Railway, between Zimbabwe and South Africa
- Barasat Basirhat Railway (1914–1955), near Kolkata, India
- Bennett Brook Railway, in Perth, Western Australia

== Other uses ==
- Bulletin for Biblical Research, a journal
- 4.5-Inch Beach Barrage Rocket, a World War II U.S. Navy weapon

== See also ==
- WBBR, New York City radio station
- WPOW (New York City), defunct radio station originally known as WBBR
