= Supersize (album) =

Studio album by Shirin David
- Released: 19 September 2019
- Genre: Pop rap; R&B
- Length: 36:38
- Label: Juicy Money
- Producer: Beatzarre; Djorkaeff; FNSHRS.

Shirin David chronology
Supersize (2019)	Bitches brauchen Rap (2021)

Singles from Supersize
- 1. "Orbit" Released: 25 January 2019; 2. "Gib Ihm" Released: 15 February 2019; 3. "Ice" Released: 5 April 2019; 4. "Fliegst Du mit" Released: 17 May 2019; 5. "On Off" Released: 28 June 2019; 6. "Brillis" Released: 23 August 2019; 7. "Nur mit dir" Released: 20 September 2019 (Note: Supersize initially contained the single "Nur mit dir" featuring Xavier Naidoo as its fourth track, placed between "Gift" and "Ice". "Nur mit dir", lasting for three minutes and 39 seconds, was written by David, Chima Ede, FNSHRS and Naidoo, while the production was handled by FNSHRS. However, David deleted the song from all platforms in November 2020, with observers opining that it was due to Naidoo's spread of COVID-19 misinformation.)

Supersize is the debut studio album by German rapper and singer Shirin David, released for digital download and streaming on 19 September 2019 by Juicy Money Records. Prior, David had primarily been a YouTuber and only ventured into music as a featured artist on Ado Kojo's 2015 top ten-hit "Du liebst mich nicht" ("You Don't Love Me"). On Supersize, David mainly collaborated with Chima Ede and FNSHRS on what reviewers categorized as pop rap and R&B songs that feature David singing and rapping. Lyrically, the album's material often delves on empowerment, hedonism, materialism and self-objectification.

Upon release, Supersize received lukewarm reviews from music critics, with them questioning David's status as a rapper and alleging that the album was released solely with the intent of generating profit from its sales. Seven singles released throughout 2019 aided the record—"Orbit", "Gib Ihm" ("Give Him"), "Ice", "Fliegst Du mit" ("Do You Fly with Me"), "On Off" featuring Maître Gims, "Brillis" and "Nur mit dir" ("Only with You") featuring Xavier Naidoo; "Gib Ihm" became David's first number-one on the German singles chart. Commercially, Supersize was successful in German-speaking countries, reaching number one in David's native country and becoming the first album by a German female solo rapper to achieve this feat. It further reached numbers two and three in Austria and Switzerland, respectively.

== Background and release ==
Prior to the release of Supersize, Shirin David was primarily a YouTuber and was also known to the general public due to her involvement as a judge on the 14th season of the German talent show Deutschland sucht den Superstar. Musically, she had only been featured on "Du liebst mich nicht" ("You Don't Love Me) by Ado Kojo in 2015, which was a top ten hit in Germany. By January 2019, work on David's debut album—initially planned to be an eponymous one released on 21 June 2019—had been ongoing, with her also having signed a record deal with Universal Music Group.

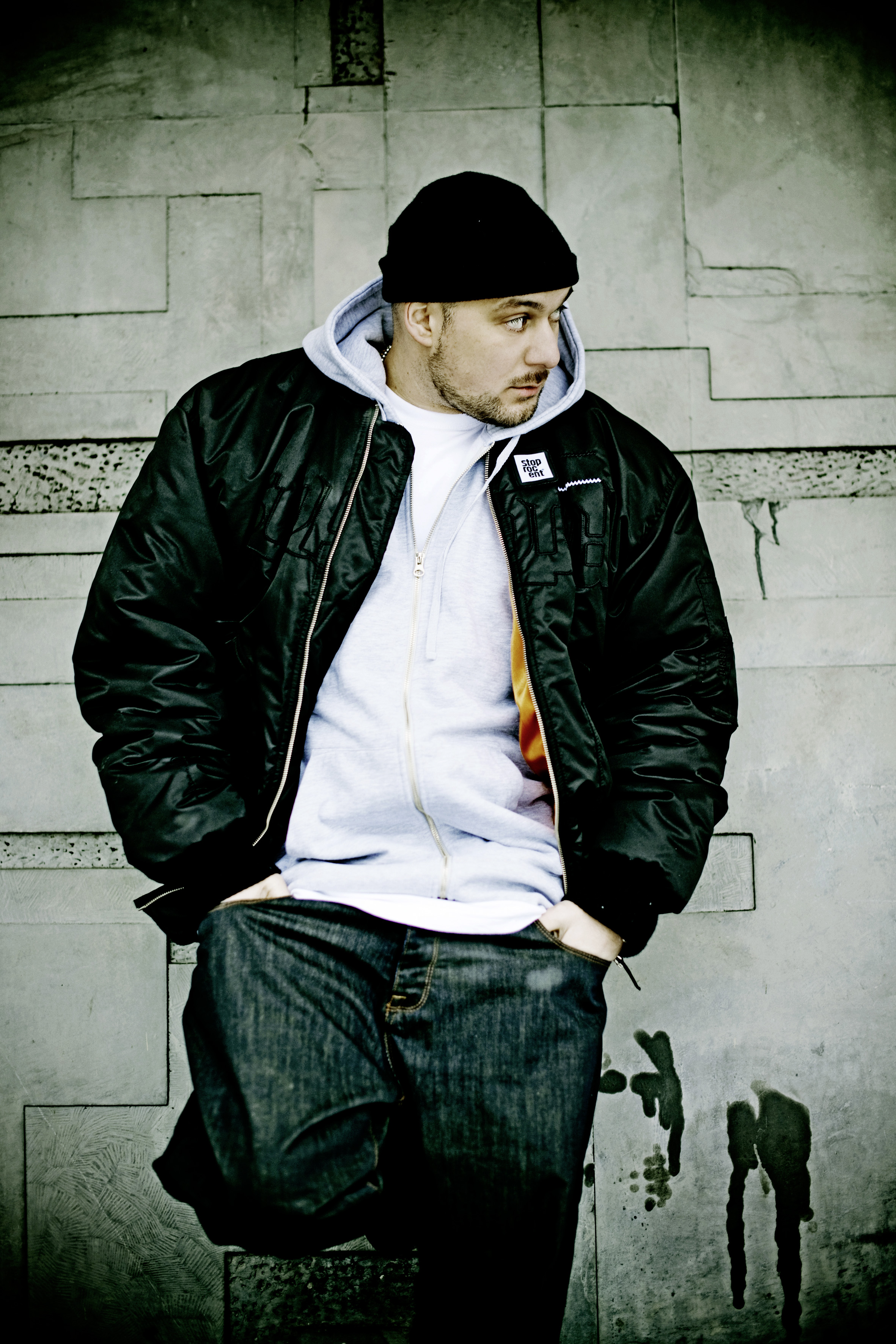
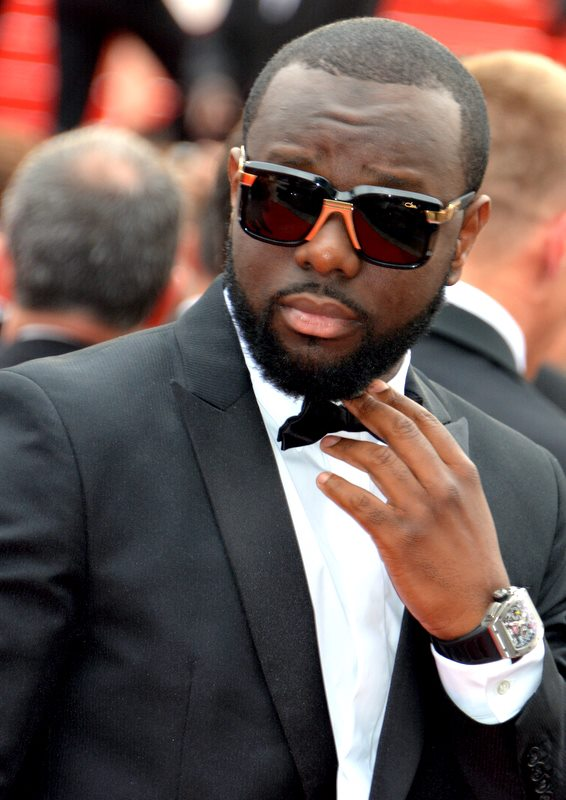
Kool Savas (left) co-wrote "On Off" on which fellow contributor Maître Gims (right) is featured.

For Supersize, David mainly collaborated with the composers Chima Ede and FNSHRS, whilst Xavier Naidoo, Maître Gims, Kool Savas, Sera Finale, Beatzarre and Djorkaeff also contributed on selected tracks. Prior to the album release, the rapper handed out ice cream to students of selected German schools during a promotional endeavour and uploaded making-of videos related to the songs to her YouTube channel. She unveiled the tracklist of Supersize in early September 2019 through her social media, and the album was ultimately made available for digital download and streaming on 19 September 2019 by Juicy Money Records.

The following day, Universal Music Group released a CD and Vertigo Berlin issued a box set; the latter had been previously teased by David in an unboxing YouTube video and contains a photo calendar, a sticker set, a sample from her then-upcoming perfume Created by Shirin, a transparent makeup bag and the bare CD of the album placed in a transparent sleeve on the outside of another transparent bag. Several observers criticized the product for its extensive use of plastic. Regarding the cover art, which shows David naked in a see-through crystal ball, the rapper stated: "I want my nudity to be as socially acceptable as men's". An editor of Extratipp commented on the image, saying that "Shirin David wants to attract attention at all costs". Upon the release of Supersize, autograph sessions were held, including one at Alexanderplatz in Berlin which had to be stopped due to overcrowding.

== Music and lyrics ==
Supersize predominantly features processed singing vocals from David and explores pop rap and R&B genres. The album, built around trap beats, occasionally delves into ballads, reggaeton and 1990s-inspired music, with David's rapping dominating on songs such as "Gib Ihm" ("Give Him") and "Ice". An editor of VIP.de noticed lyrical connections between "Ice" and "Gib Ihm", calling the former a continuation of the latter. The album's lyrics are often sexual and portray her as a "rapper with the gangster attitude", addressing themes of empowerment, hedonism, materialism, her body and self-objectification. Nadine Lange of Der Tagesspiegel opined that David "represents a stereotypical image of women" and did not think the lyrics were of a feminist nature since the "women [in them], whom David [refers to as] hookers, bitches and whores, only appear as competitors for or as decoration [alongside the male protagonist]".

"Fliegst Du mit" ("Do You Fly with Me"), whose content differs from the aforementioned, talks about David's complicated relationship with her father, who abandoned her when she was a child, and the long lasting effects his departure had on her. She referred to the song as one of her most personal ones and stated that, with it, she "wants to give other girls without a father figure a sense of belonging". "Brillis", melodically close to France Gall's "Ella, elle l'a" (1987), has been called an "ode to friendship". While "Größter Fan" ("Biggest Fan") addresses David's haters, the romantic "Nur mit dir" ("Only with You") featuring Naidoo talks about missing a significant other, and the bilingual "On Off" performed in German by her and in French by Maître Gims details an ambivalent relationship.

== Critical reception ==
Supersize received lukewarm reviews from music critics. Mirco Leier, writing for laut.de, questioned David's status as a rapper and hip hop artist, claiming that she utilized the genre "solely as a means to an end". While praising her vocal delivery, the production and the catchniess of "On Off" and "Brillis", Leier labelled Supersize as "harmless". He concluded: "[N]one of it feels tangible or substantial. [...] [David] makes sure to present herself as controversially as possible [...] [, but whenever she] is a topic in the media, this rarely is because of [her] music. The character Shirin David is human product placement".

Der Spiegel's Andreas Borcholte stated that "music seems to be just an accessory in this enactment" and sarcastically opined that "you could also have called the record 'Supersale'" since he believed generating profit was David's main goal. Borcholte thought the album was mediocre and generic, though he hailed "Gib Ihm" as its best track and was also moderately positive towards "Größter Fan"—which he thought Aaliyah was an inspiration for—and "Melodien" ("Melodies"). In a more positive review, Theresa Hein of Süddeutsche Zeitung saw Supersize as being a "good" album and praised the emotional nature of "Fliegst Du mit". She further commended "On Off", which she likened to Beyoncé's "Baby Boy" (2003), and thought that "Gib Ihm" was inspired by "Super Bass" (2011) by Nicki Minaj and had "the best German pop refrain of the year". Lange saw the tracks as "solid and well-sung" and opined that, even though "[David's] few rap lines are rather mediocre", she is "convincing". The reviewer further compared "Unsichtbar" ("Invisible") to material from Helene Fischer's catalogue.

== Promotion and commercial performance ==
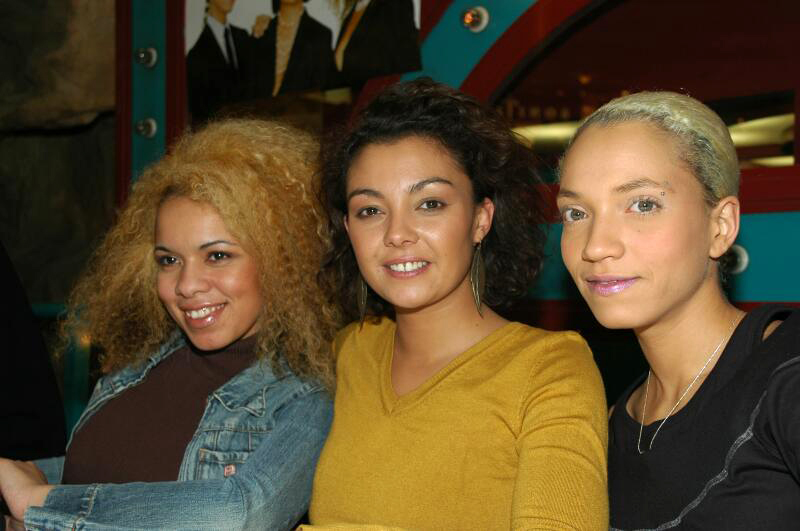
David became the first German female rap act to have a number-one album in Germany since Tic Tac Toe (pictured) topped the chart in 1997.

Supersize was supported by seven singles released throughout 2019—"Orbit" (25 January), "Gib Ihm" (15 February), "Ice" (5 April), "Fliegst Du mit" (17 May), "On Off" (28 June), "Brillis" (23 August) and "Nur mit dir" (20 September). While all of them reached the top ten on the German singles chart and at least the top 15 and 30 in Austria and Switzerland, respectively, "Gib Ihm" became David's first number-one in Germany. The Bundesverband Musikindustrie (BVMI) and the Austrian International Federation of the Phonographic Industry (IFPI AUT) awarded platinum certifications to "Gib Ihm" and gold certifications to "On Off". Except for "Orbit", each single received a music video; "Gib Ihm" broke the record for the fastest German music video to amass one million views, achieving the feat in five hours and 52 minutes. The visual for "On Off" was controversial, with David being accused of blackfishing due to the darker make-up she wore in it.

In July 2019, David was due to have her first-ever live performance at the Wireless Germany festival, but the gig was canceled. Upon release, Supersize was a commercial success in German-speaking countries, debuting and peaking atop the German albums charts, as well as at numbers two and three in Austria and Switzerland, respectively. The album is the first by a German solo female rapper to top the chart in Germany and is also the first by a German female rap act since Klappe die 2te (1997) by Tic Tac Toe to reach number one. Six days after its release, each track on Supersize had amassed between 500,000 and four million streams on Spotify. In November 2020, David deleted "Nur mit dir" and its music video from all platforms, with observers opining that it was due to Naidoo's spread of COVID-19 misinformation.

== Track listing ==
Credits and tracklist adapted from Spotify.

Supersize track listing
No.	Title	Writer(s)	Producer(s)	Length
1.	"Orbit"	Shirin David; Chima Ede; FNSHRS	FNSHRS	3:17
2.	"Gib Ihm"	David; Chima Ede; FNSHRS	FNSHRS	2:43
3.	"Gift"	David; Chima Ede; FNSHRS	FNSHRS	2:59
4.	"Ice"	David; Chima Ede; FNSHRS	FNSHRS	2:54
5.	"Brillis"	David; Chima Ede; FNSHRS	FNSHRS	3:06
6.	"Größter Fan"	David; Chima Ede; FNSHRS	FNSHRS	3:14
7.	"On Off" (featuring Maître Gims)	David; Chima Ede; FNSHRS; Maître Gims; Kool Savas	FNSHRS	3:11
8.	"Fliegst Du mit"	David; Chima Ede; Sera Finale; FNSHRS	FNSHRS	4:18
9.	"Melodien"	David; Chima Ede; FNSHRS	FNSHRS	4:33
10.	"Unsichtbar"	David; Chima Ede; Finale; FNSHRS	FNSHRS	3:22
11.	"Gibt es dich?"	Beatzarre; David; Djorkaeff; Chima Ede	Beatzarre; Djorkaeff	3:01
Total length:				36:38

== Charts ==
=== Weekly charts ===
Weekly chart performance for Supersize
Chart (2019)	Peak position
Austrian Albums (Ö3 Austria)	2
German Albums (Offizielle Top 100)	1
German Hip Hop Albums (Offizielle Top 100)	1
Swiss Albums (Schweizer Hitparade)	3

=== Year-end charts ===
Year-end chart performance for Supersize
Chart (2019)	Position
German Albums (Offizielle Top 100)	84

== Release history ==
Release history for Supersize
Region	Date	Format	Label	Ref.
Various	19 September 2019	Digital download; streaming	Juicy Money	
Various	20 September 2019	CD	Universal	
Various	20 September 2019	Box set	Vertigo Berlin	
