= Bitches brauchen Rap =

Studio album by Shirin David
- Released: 19 November 2021
- Genre: Rap; trap
- Length: 48:03
- Label: Juicy Money
- Producer: Frio; Geenaro; Ghana Beats; Juh-Dee; Young Mesh

Shirin David chronology
Supersize (2019)	Bitches brauchen Rap (2021)	Schlau aber blond (2025)

Singles from Bitches brauchen Rap
- 1. "Ich darf das" Released: 13 May 2021; 2. "Lieben wir" Released: 1 July 2021; 3. "Be a Hoe/Break a Hoe" Released: 28 October 2021; 4. "Schlechtes Vorbild" Released: 12 November 2021

Bitches brauchen Rap (German for Bitches Need Rap; also abbreviated as BBR) is the second studio album by German rapper and singer Shirin David, released for digital download and streaming on 19 November 2021 by Juicy Money Records. The follow-up to David's debut effort Supersize (2019), Bitches brauchen Rap was developed over the span of circa two years, mainly in collaboration with composers Juh-Dee, Frio, Young Mesh, Laas Unltd. and Ghana Beats. Around that time, the rapper was also involved in the making of her ice tea brand DirTea and in a partnership with Savage X Fenty, which led to a delay of the record. The album was classified as an old-school rap and trap album by music critics, with its themes including the mistreatment of women in the music industry and society, women's empowerment and media criticism of David.

Reviewers were generally positive towards Bitches brauchen Rap, with several viewing it as a statement and as an important contribution to the German rap scene, as well as an improvement over Supersize. The album was commercially successful, reaching number three in Germany and Austria, and number four in Switzerland. Its performance, however, was considerably impacted by Adele's 30, which shared the same release date. Bitches brauchen Rap was aided by four singles prior to its premiere—"Ich darf das" ("I Can Do That"), "Lieben wir" ("We Love It"), "Be a Hoe/Break a Hoe" featuring Kitty Kat and "Schlechtes Vorbild" ("Bad Model"). The former three all received music videos and were number-one hits on the German singles chart, while "Ich darf das" was certified gold by Bundesverband Musikindustrie (BVMI).

== Background and creation ==
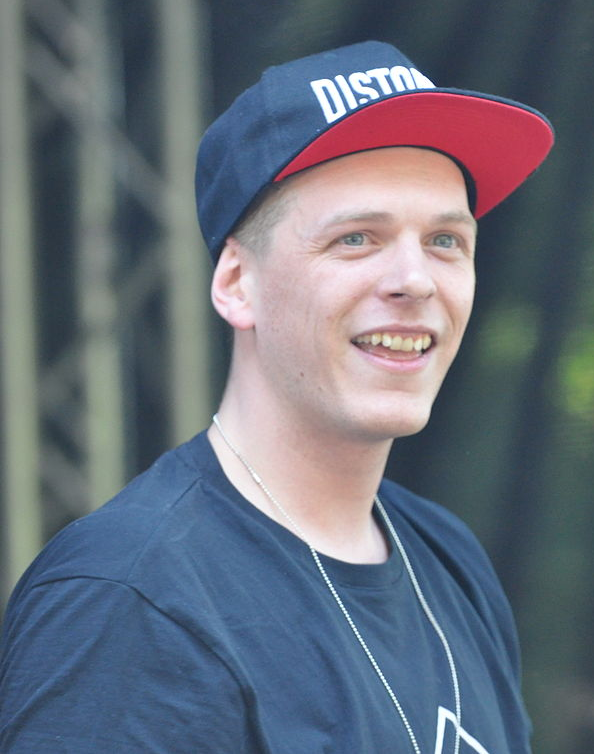
Laas Unltd. was one of the main collaborators on Bitches brauchen Rap.

Shirin David, initially a YouTuber, released her commercially successful debut studio album Supersize in 2019, which became the first album by a German female rapper to top the German albums chart. The record was sonically different to Bitches brauchen Rap, predominantly featuring singing vocals from David and exploring pop rap and R&B. It was the subject of criticism from observers, with them questioning David's status as a rapper and deeming her venture into music as being shallow and primarily done with the intent of generating profits. Additionally, David was involved in several controversies, including being linked to homophobic rappers and accused of cultural appropriation.

After being dissatisfied with a project that included around 12 tracks which was intended to be the follow-up to Supersize (its intended lead single "90-60-111" and "Hoes Up G's Down" had already been released), she scrapped it in mid 2020 and began working on Bitches brauchen Rap, retaining three already concepted tracks: "Bae", "Dior Sauvage" and "Heute nicht" ("Not Today"). The album was in development for around two years and, according to David, is not "what the label wanted from her, but solely her musical vision and that of her companions". In January 2021, sessions were held with composers Juh-Dee, Frio, Young Mesh, Laas Unltd. and Ghana Beats in two Gran Canaria mansions, while Bozza, Geenaro, Shindy and Kitty Kat also contributed on selected tracks. David's workflow consisted of privately developing ideas and demos which she then brought to the studio and revised with her collaborators. Around 30 songs were composed for Bitches brauchen Rap, of which only 15 made the final cut after one was dropped last-minute. The writing on "Bramfeld Storys" took nine days to be finished, while nine different hooks had been tried for "Juicy Money".

== Title and release ==
In June 2021, David unveiled the album's title, which was made up during discussions with her sister Patricia, who was inspired by the initials of the Brazilian butt lift procedure (BBL). David further elaborated that she desired to reappropriate the word "bitches", with it standing for "all women and [being] transform[ed] [from] the swear word into a self-description with positive connotations". The rapper has a notable background of advocating for women's empowerment and fighting sexism and misogyny, viewing herself as a neofeminist. She stated on the title:

"I called the album 'Bitches brauchen Rap' because I had a lot on my mind that I've wanted to get rid of for a very long time. Basically, I always had a defensive attitude when it came to a lot of topics and I never really answered anything when there were attacks against me. And with [this] album I'm [fighting back] for the first time because I feel ready."

Snippets of the album were unveiled throughout June and August 2021, and its initial release date was on 2 September 2021 before being postponed due to David's heavy involvement in the development of her ice tea brand DirTea and her partnership with Savage X Fenty. She further stated: "With only two singles out ["Ich darf das" ("I Can Do That") and "Lieben wir" ("We Love It")], I just can't drop this album. It needs more love, it needs more attention, it needs more promotion". On 31 October 2021, the tracklist for Bitches brauchen Rap was unveiled via the rapper's Instagram, and a track-by-track teaser video alongside commentary by David was uploaded to YouTube on 7 November 2021. The album was ultimately issued on 19 November 2021 and a release party was held on the same day in a club in Berlin. Juicy Money Records released Bitches brauchen Rap for digital download and streaming, while two box sets were also made available. They were sold for around €50 and €100, respectively, containing various merchandise alongside a poster and CD of the album. One box featured a signed poster and its buyer was personally given the number-one award that "Ich darf das" received for topping the German singles chart. The album cover portrays David as what Thomas Winkler of Musikexpress likened to Marlene Dietrich and "a femme fatale movie star from the black and white era". David stated:

I wanted something very close and personal for the cover. Before you say things like 'from now on you can cancel me' [in a song] as a liberation, you go through several stages of processing a lot of anger, sadness and pain. Of course, the last seven years have been more than good for me and I'm in a very privileged position. Nevertheless, the album was born out of a lot of suffering. And even if it's called 'Bitches brauchen Rap' and it's loud, you have to go through a difficult time to be able to get loud. That's why the cover artwork should show a woman who went through pain, processed it and is now above it.

== Music and lyrics ==
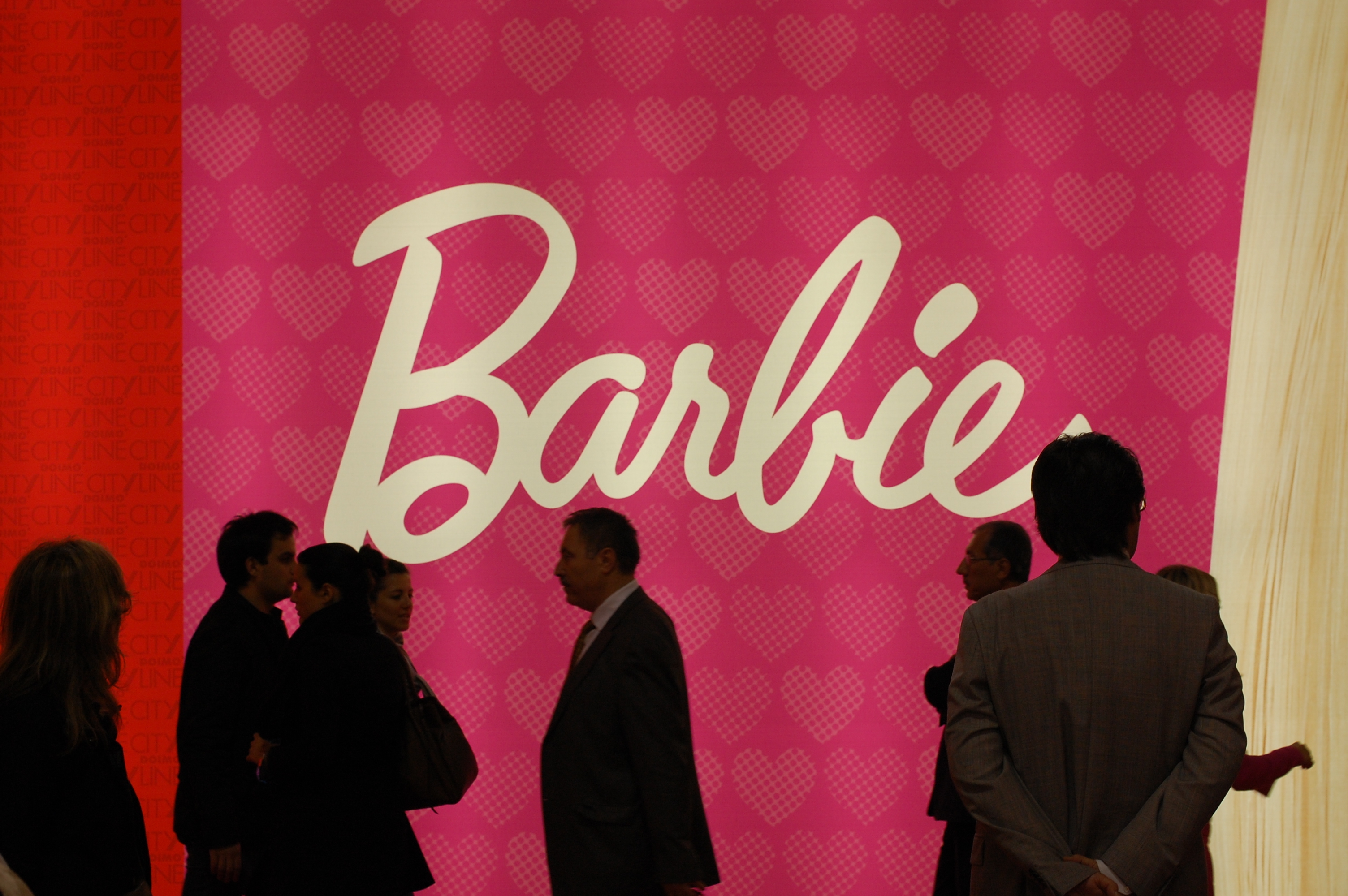
David occasionally refers to herself as a Barbie (logo pictured) doll throughout the album.

Bitches brauchen Rap contains 15 songs and lasts for 48 minutes and three seconds. Critics classified it as a boom bap, 2000s R&B and pop trap-influenced old-school rap and trap album whose production relies on heavy bass and prominent beats. David's delivery is often harsh and straightforward as she talks about "a music industry full of double standards, hypocrisy and abuse" and "illustrate[s] [its] [...] inherently sexist nature", as well as politics and addresses "from her own role the way in which [the] society deal[s] with self-determined women".

Apart from occasional views on fashion, materialism and bisexuality, Bitches brauchen Rap further deals with feminism, women's empowerment and the criticism received by David for allegedly conveying a problematic image of women due to her plastic surgeries and revealing outfits. The album's lyrics are vulgar and contain instances of self-sexualization, double entendre, dissing, word play and pun usage. As part of various references to pop culture, David sometimes refers to herself as a Barbie doll as inspired by her full name Barbara Shirin Davidavičius. To summarize the album's theme, Lukas Hildebrand and Julian Schmelmer of Stern described it as being "somewhere between Alice Schwarzer and Kanye West".

== Songs ==
=== Tracks 1–8 ===
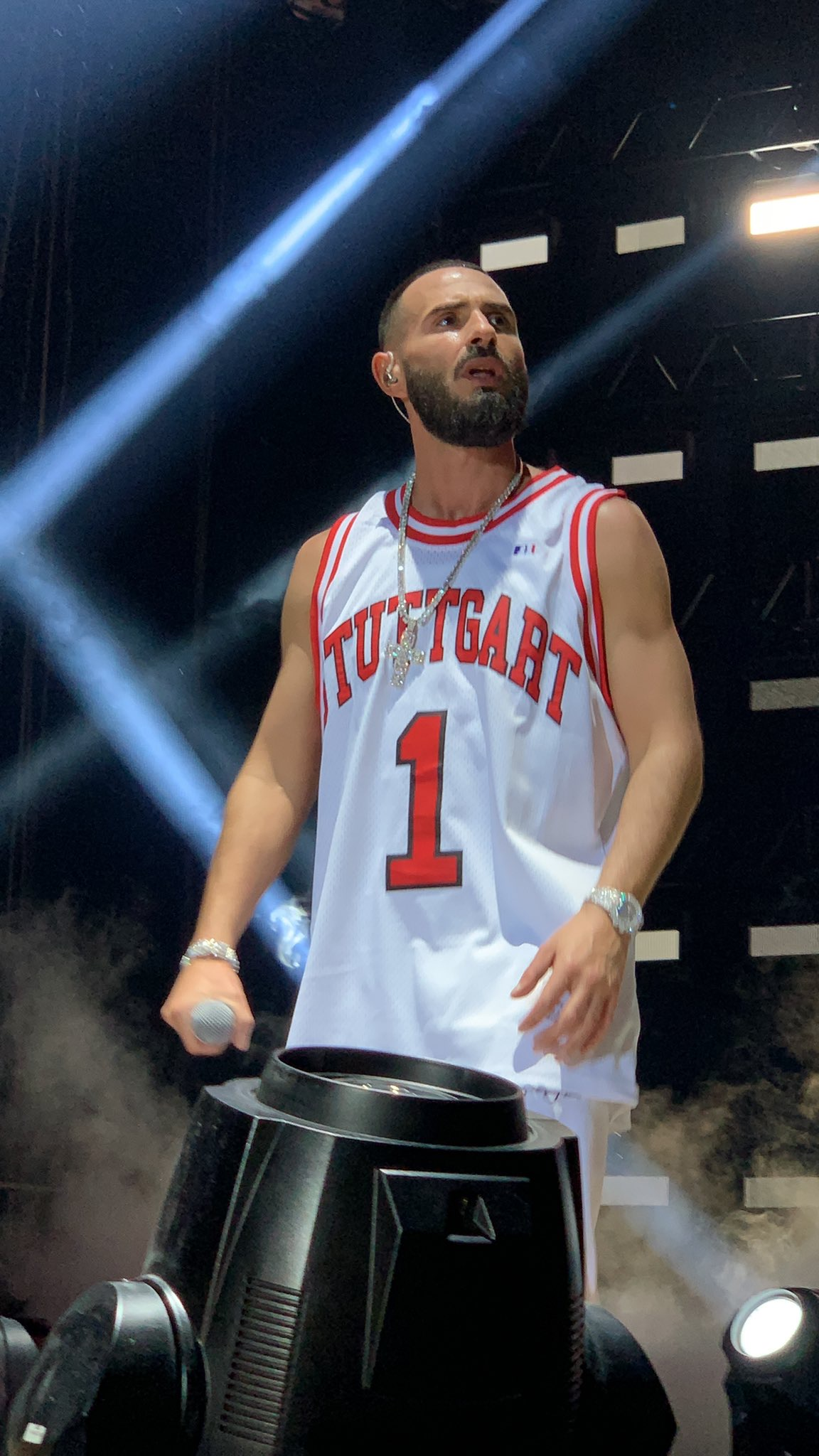
Shindy (pictured) is featured on "NDA's", the fifth song on Bitches brauchen Rap.

Bitches brauchen Rap opens with "Babsi Bars", where David raps about the limited options of women in society, name-dropping Barbra Streisand, Princess Diana and Alisha Lehmann. It then continues with "Depressionen im Paradies" ("Depressions in Paradise") which features snippets from a phone call with David's sister and delves into the rapper's fears, indifference and greed for success related to being famous; she also recalls her early days and an incident where she requested Hartz IV with her mother. Mirco Leier of laut.de found that David "packs [the song] with just the right amount of pathos and, despite her superstar status, chooses words that can be understood even without having millions in the bank account". The third track, "Last Bitch Standing", begins with a monologue by Nicki Minaj and addresses observers denying David's status as a rapper since she does not write her songs alone but rather with her collaborators. Furthermore, the song also touches on cancel culture and making mistakes.

Bitches brauchen Rap continues with "Ich darf das", which features more singing from David and delves into the themes of confidence and mutual support of women; David also raps about having the right to do what she wants, such as rejecting several feature offers that she received. "NDA's" is inspired by criticism directed at the rapper's habit of signing non-disclosure agreements (NDAs) with her collaborators in order to feel comfortable, and also addresses controversial incidents she had with individuals in the studio. The song features Shindy, who recorded his part as a birthday surprise for David, with observers regarding it as a "public reconciliation" between the two after a feud and a lawsuit that received extensive media coverage. "NDA's" closes with a line that an editor of 16Bars viewed as a possible diss to Fler, who had dedicated his song "Shirinbae" to her. While the lyrics of "Lieben wir" are about "hurt, insecure and inflated" masculinity and David's love for bad boys, "Man's World"—containing a vocal sample from James Brown—hails celebrities such as Minaj, Kim Kardashian, Greta Thunberg, Sophia Thiel, Kamala Harris and Pamela Anderson as role models. It concludes that, regardless of a woman's goals and ambitions, her outer appearance "will always be the first thing people will talk about and judge [her] for".

=== Tracks 9–15 ===
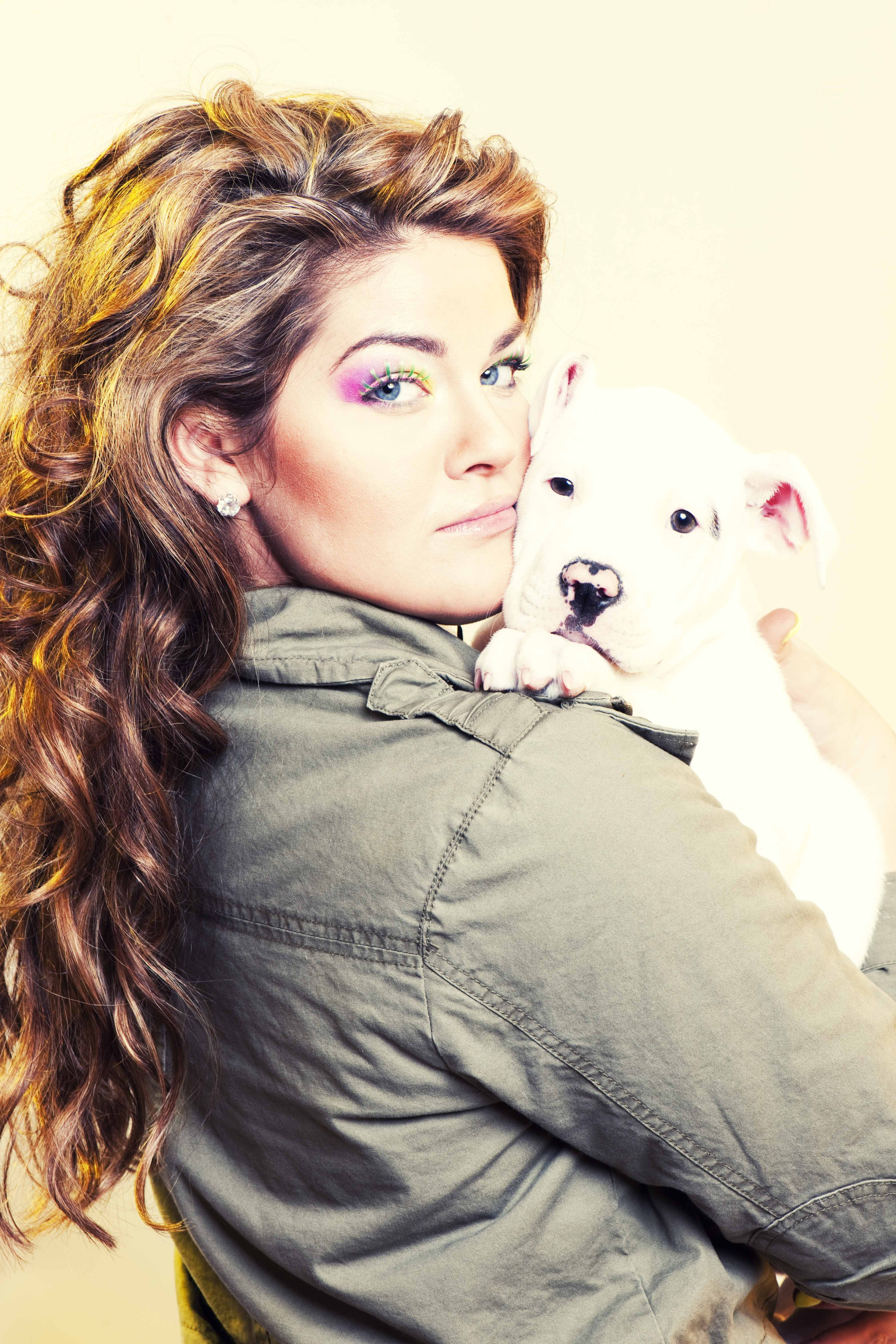
The album's tenth track, "Be a Hoe/Break a Hoe", includes vocals from Kitty Kat (pictured).

According to Annika Eichstädt of MADS, "Bae", the ninth song on Bitches brauchen Rap, differs thematically from other tracks on the album alongside "Dior Sauvage" and "Heute nicht". While "Bae" is about protecting a girlfriend from a womanizer, "Dior Sauvage" and "Heute nicht" are love songs about being reminded by a past significant other by a smell, and about being fed up with excuses from an ex-lover, respectively. David predominantly sings on "Dior Sauvage", which was inspired by her manager having worn the titular perfume around her. "Be a Hoe/Break a Hoe" featuring Kitty Kat is placed between "Bae" and "Dior Sauvage", and has the latter addressing sexism, her haters and her time as part of the group Aggro Berlin. She also disses Sido by referencing the 2008 song "Strip für mich" ("Strip for Me"). The title track follows as the 13th song on Bitches brauchen Rap after "Heute nicht", and sees David affirming her desire of seeing women be successful and talking allegations of her hiring ghostwriters. 16Bars thought that a line in the song alluded to Bushido and his 2020 track "2003".

"Schlechtes Vorbild" ("Bad Model"), was likened to Eminem's "Stan" (2000) by multiple critics due to it being written from the perspective of a fictional 14-year-old fan who reaches out to David through direct message on Instagram to talk about being disregarded by people around her and the sexual abuse she experiences from her male physical education teacher. Bitches brauchen Rap ends with "Bramfeld Storys", an almost nine-minute track with 154 bars whose name is derived from the Hamburg quarter David grew up in. The autobiographical song documents her development and the highs and lows of her career; she talks about being the child of outlandish parents, being abandoned by her father, her YouTube career, her differences with television channel RTL during her time as a juror on the talent show Deutschland sucht den Superstar, label complications and the feud with Shindy. Apart from referencing the rappers Farid Bang and Kurdo, "Bramfeld Storys" also features several samples from televised show segments about David, including one hosted by journalist Martina Taubert. The song received a comparison to "Control" (2013) by Big Sean and to freestyle raps popular in the United States from Die Zeit's Daniel Gerhardt.

== Critical reception ==
Professional ratings
Review scores
Source	Rating
Mix1	7/8 stars
Musikexpress	4/6 stars

Bitches brauchen Rap received generally positive reviews from music critics. Several saw it as a response to observers who had questioned her status as an artist, further hailing it as a statement and an important contribution to the German rap scene, proving that there also is a place for female artists. Gerhardt saw Bitches brauchen Rap as superior to its predecessor Supersize, praising its message and David's confidence and commending "Bramfeld Storys" for being "by far" her best song ever made. Hildebrand and Schmelmer also viewed "Bramfeld Storys" as an album highlight and saw Bitches brauchen Rap as having no skips, and as being "harsher" and "darker" than Supersize. While also applauding the detailed production, they concluded that the record "seems like a liberation from an artist who knew early on what she wanted, but later discovered what the whole thing could sound like".

Eichstädt gave another positive review, regarding Bitches brauchen Rap as an evolution from David's debut album and hailing the title track as the best song. She slightly criticised the production for being repetitive at times and "Juicy Money" for being weaker in comparison to the other songs, but concluded that the music was "well thought out". She further stated: "That may not be the right definition of feminism for everyone, but hers it is. Shirin David is a controversial, albeit strong, voice for women in German rap". While Profil's Phillip Dulle and Lena Leibetseder positively characterised David as a "confident, shrill female rapper [...] who shine[s] with strong statements and [...] [who] [doesn't] mince [her] words", Sina Schmid of Akutmag praised Bitches brauchen Rap as stable and diverse, as well as commended "NDA's" and Shindy's contribution on it. However, Schmid was critical of the album's length: "For two years of work and the extreme PR machinery, expectations were high". Melissa Erhardt, writing for ORF, lauded the album: "Every line fits, is shot out with an insatiable hunger and a lot of wink, so that you want to stay tuned till the last second to know what's coming next".

Ken Merten of Junge Welt hailed Bitches brauchen Rap as the most important German rap release of 2021 alongside Das schwarze Album (The Black Album) by Haftbefehl, praising its features, humorous lines and "conservative" beats that are "too pointed to bore" the listener. In a more mixed review, Leier called the record cohesive, but noticed that David's voice did not fit well enough with all the genres it explored. He criticized the hook of "Ich darf das" as "put on and awkward", her trash-talk on "NDA's" as missing "vocal emphasis" and the rhymes on "Heute nicht" as "almost border[ing] on cringe". Leier further called Bitches brauchen Rap mostly focused, although feeling that the quality varied between songs and that "Bramfeld Storys" was overly long. He concluded by calling the album "worth listening to" and additionally stated that David "throws her carefully cultivated public image out of the window [...] and kicks in the door with a bang. So there she is, the new Shirin, the rapping Shirin, the tough Shirin, the 'real' Shirin". Musikexpress's Winkler regarded various aspects of Bitches brauchen Rap as contradictory and did not agree with the content of some, in David's opinion, feminist lyrics.

=== Year-end lists ===
Year-end rankings of Bitches brauchen Rap and its songs
Publication	List	Recipient	Rank	Ref.
Diffus	10 Best Domestic Albums of 2021	Bitches brauchen Rap	—N/a	
MADS	Best Albums of 2021	Bitches brauchen Rap	4	
Musikexpress	50 Best Albums of 2021	Bitches brauchen Rap	—N/a	
MZEE	Best Songs of 2021	"Man's World"	6	

== Singles and commercial performance ==
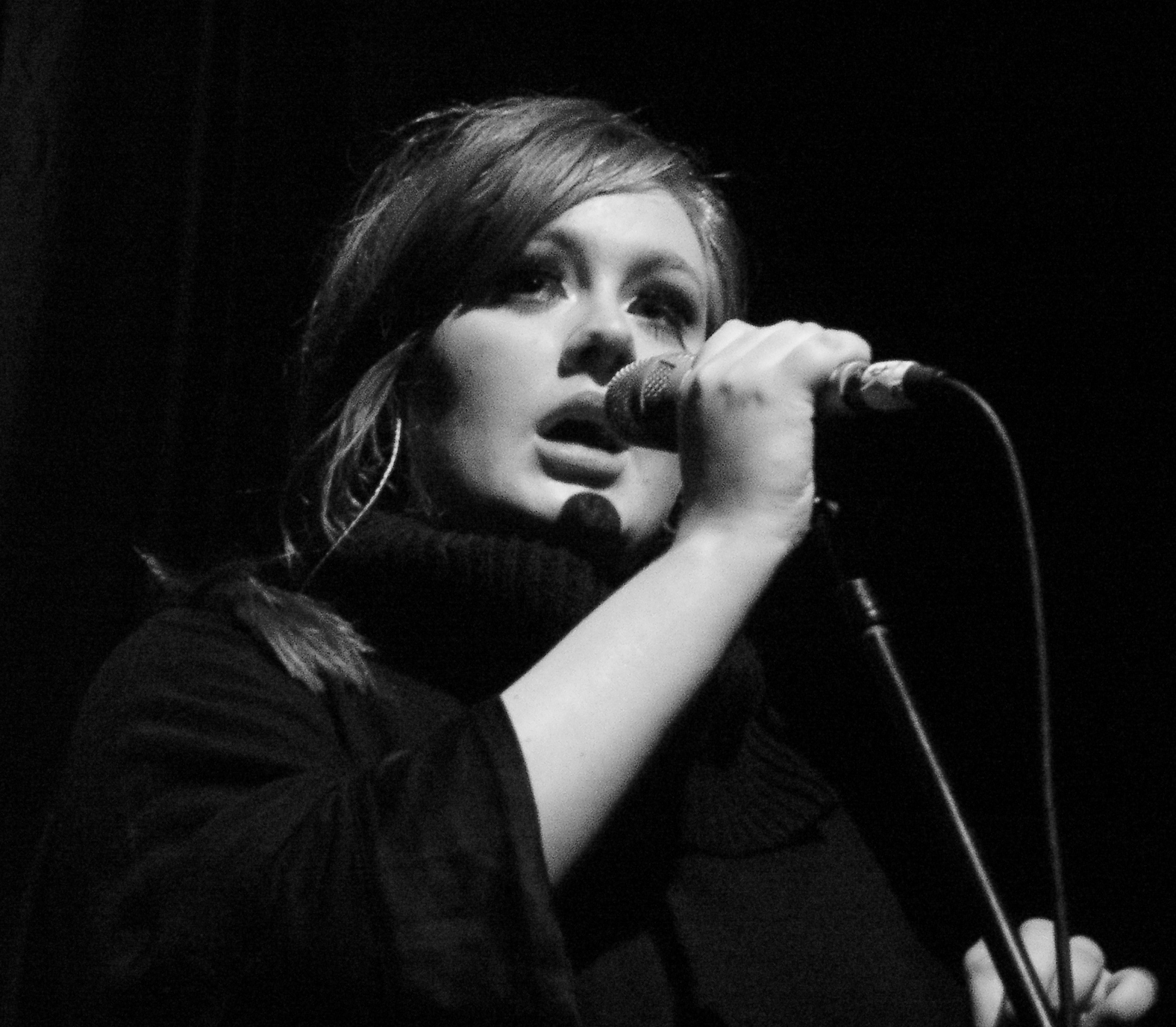
Music professionals saw Adele's (pictured) 30 as affecting the performance of Bitches brauchen Rap on the German albums chart due to the same release date of 19 November.

"Babsi Bars", the opener of Bitches brauchen Rap, received a music video that was posted to David's YouTube channel on 13 December 2020. The song was only made available for streaming and digital download with the album's release, and went on to peak at number 40 in Switzerland. Bitches brauchen Rap was supported by four singles released throughout 2021―"Ich darf das" (13 May), "Lieben wir" (1 July), "Be a Hoe/Break a Hoe" featuring Kitty Kat (28 October), and "Schlechtes Vorbild" (12 November). The former three received music videos, and all reached number one on the German singles chart and the top ten and at least the top 20 in Austria and Switzerland, respectively. "Ich darf das" was certified gold by both the Bundesverband Musikindustrie (BVMI) and the Austrian International Federation of the Phonographic Industry (IFPI AUT). The album track "NDA's" reached modest peaks in the DACH territories upon the release of Bitches brauchen Raps, peaking at number 14 in Germany. To further promote the album's premiere, a music video for "Bramfeld Storys" was released on the same date.

In the weekend of its release, Bitches brauchen Rap amassed 11.4 million streams (over 110 million if combined with all the previously released singles) on Spotify, making it the most successful weekend streaming debut of a German female artist and the fourth-most streamed album worldwide on Spotify in that time span. On the week ending 26 November 2021, the album debuted and peaked at number three on the German albums chart, behind 30 by Adele and Voyage by ABBA; observers had previously opined that the performance of Bitches brauchen Rap would be majorly impacted by 30, which shared the same release date. The album also charted at numbers three and four on the albums charts of Austria and Switzerland, respectively.

== Track listing ==
Credits and tracklist adapted from Spotify.

Bitches brauchen Rap track listing
No.	Title	Writer(s)	Producer(s)	Length
1.	"Babsi Bars"	Shirin David; Frio; Juh-Dee; Laas Unltd.; Young Mesh	Frio; Juh-Dee; Young Mesh	2:30
2.	"Depressionen im Paradies"	David; Frio; Juh-Dee; Laas Unltd.; Young Mesh	Frio; Juh-Dee; Young Mesh	3:10
3.	"Last Bitch Standing"	David; Frio; Juh-Dee; Laas Unltd.; Young Mesh	Frio; Juh-Dee; Young Mesh	3:05
4.	"Ich darf das"	David; Frio; Juh-Dee; Laas Unltd.; Young Mesh	Frio; Juh-Dee; Young Mesh	2:31
5.	"NDA's" (featuring Shindy)	David; Frio; Juh-Dee; Laas Unltd.; Shindy; Young Mesh	Frio; Juh-Dee; Young Mesh	3:49
6.	"Juicy Money"	Bozza; David; Frio; Juh-Dee; Laas Unltd.; Young Mesh	Frio; Juh-Dee; Young Mesh	2:46
7.	"Lieben wir"	David; Frio; Juh-Dee; Laas Unltd.; Young Mesh	Frio; Juh-Dee; Young Mesh	2:35
8.	"Man's World"	David; Frio; Juh-Dee; Laas Unltd.; Young Mesh	Frio; Juh-Dee; Young Mesh	2:47
9.	"Bae"	Bozza; Fayan; Frio; Juh-Dee; Young Mesh	Frio; Juh-Dee; Young Mesh	2:20
10.	"Be a Hoe/Break a Hoe" (featuring Kitty Kat)	David; Geenaro; Ghana Beats; Kitty Kat; Laas Unltd.	Geenaro; Ghana Beats	2:51
11.	"Dior Sauvage"	Bozza; David; Frio; Geenaro; Juh-Dee; Laas Unltd.; Young Mesh	Frio; Juh-Dee; Young Mesh	2:18
12.	"Heute nicht"	Bozza; David; Frio; Geenaro; Ghana Beats	Frio; Geenaro; Ghana Beats	2:31
13.	"Bitches brauchen Rap"	David; Frio; Juh-Dee; Laas Unltd.; Young Mesh	Frio; Juh-Dee; Young Mesh	2:51
14.	"Schlechtes Vorbild"	David; Frio; Juh-Dee; Laas Unltd.; Young Mesh	Frio; Juh-Dee; Young Mesh	2:57
15.	"Bramfeld Storys"	David; Frio; Juh-Dee; Laas Unltd.; Young Mesh	Frio; Juh-Dee; Young Mesh	8:55
Total length:				48:03

== Charts ==
=== Weekly charts ===
Weekly chart performance for Bitches brauchen Rap
Chart (2021)	Peak position
Austrian Albums (Ö3 Austria)	3
German Albums (Offizielle Top 100)	3
German Hip Hop Albums (Offizielle Top 100)	1
Swiss Albums (Schweizer Hitparade)	4

=== Year-end charts ===
2021 year-end chart performance for Bitches brauchen Rap
Chart (2021)	Position
German Albums (Offizielle Top 100)	36
Swiss Albums (Schweizer Hitparade)	62

2022 year-end chart performance for Bitches brauchen Rap
Chart (2022)	Position
German Albums (Offizielle Top 100)	92

2023 year-end chart performance for Bitches brauchen Rap
Chart (2023)	Position
German Albums (Offizielle Top 100)	79

== Certifications ==
Certifications for Bitches brauchen Rap
Region	Certification	Certified units/sales
Germany (BVMI)	Gold	100,000^{‡}
^{‡} Sales+streaming figures based on certification alone.

== Release history ==
Release history for Bitches brauchen Rap
Region	Date	Format	Label	Ref.
Various	19 November 2021	Digital download; streaming	Juicy Money	
Various	Unknown	Box set	Unknown	
