= Blumengarten =

German pop duo

- Origin: Velbert, North Rhine-Westphalia, Germany
- Genres: Pop; indie; house; hip-hop
- Years active: 2021–present
- Members: Rayan Djima; Samuel Eickmann
- Website: blumengarten.world

Blumengarten is a German musical duo formed in 2021 in Velbert by singer Rayan Djima and guitarist/producer Samuel "Sammy" Eickmann. They play a mix of pop, indie, house, and hip-hop music. The duo has released the album Ich liebe dich für immer (2025) as well as several EPs.

== History ==
Samuel "Sammy" Eickmann and the Cameroonian-born Rayan Djima both grew up in the North Rhine-Westphalia town of Velbert, and they met in school. Sammy had been producing music from the age of 14, and Djima, who goes by his first name, enjoyed singing. They began making music together in 2021 and released their debut, three-track EP, sag deinen freunden, dass du sie liebst, in 2022. Their sound combined elements of hip-hop, indie, and pop. Their first single, "paris syndrom", gained attention online, including from such musicians as Paula Hartmann and Casper.

The duo's second EP, versprochen, alles wird gut!, came out in 2023, and it won them a Polyton award in the Best Composition category. It was followed the same year by a collaboration with the rap crew 01099, on the single "rosa rugosa". The duo was later featured on the Cro track "Nie Wieder Normal".

In 2023, Blumengarten supported such acts as Ennio, Casper, Cro, 01099, and OK Kid, and later embarked on their first headlining tour, which included stops across Germany, Austria, and Switzerland, accompanied by a full backing band.

At the end of the year, the duo released their third EP, schönheit die in schmerzen liegt, and they were honored with the popNRW prize for Best Newcomer as well as the 2023 Pop Culture Prize in the category Most Promising Newcomer.

In 2024, Blumengarten issued the first singles from their upcoming full-length album, "Daheim" and "ich liebe dich für immer". The record, also titled Ich liebe dich für immer, came out in March 2025. In September, they performed at the Together for Palestine benefit concert, held at the Palladium in Cologne, with the proceeds going to the aid organization Cadus.

In 2026, the track "Gut Genug", a collaboration with KitschKrieg and Shirin David, went viral on social media, bringing the duo to international attention. In June, they released the EP radio.

== Band members ==
- Rayan Djima – vocals
- Samuel "Sammy" Eickmann – guitar

== Discography ==
Studio albums

- Ich liebe dich für immer (2025)

EPs

- sag deinen freunden, dass du sie liebst (2022)
- versprochen, alles wird gut! (2023)
- schönheit die in schmerzen liegt (2023)
- radio (2026)

Guest appearances

- "Nie wieder normal" – Cro feat. Blumengarten (2023)
- "Die Anderen" – Bazzazian feat. Blumengarten & Trettmann (2024)
- "Augen in der Nacht" – Apsilon feat. Blumengarten (2024)
- "Kaum Vertrauen" – Bazzazian feat. Blumengarten & Casper (2024)
- "Oben" – Billa Joe feat. Blumengarten (2026)
- "Gut Genug" – KitschKrieg feat. Blumengarten & Shirin David (2026)
- "War nie weg" – Ufo361 feat. Blumengarten & Souly (2026)

== Awards ==
- Polyton award for Best Composition (2023)
- popNRW prize for Best Newcomer (2023)
- Pop Culture Prize for Most Promising Newcomer (2023)
- Sponsorship award of the state of North Rhine-Westphalia for Music (2024)
