= List of number-one hits of 2026 (Austria) =

This is a list of the Austrian number-one singles and albums of 2026 as compiled by Ö3 Austria Top 40, the official chart provider of Austria.

Issue date	Song	Artist	Ref.	Album	Artist	Ref.
2 January	"The Fate of Ophelia"	Taylor Swift		The Life of a Showgirl	Taylor Swift	
9 January	"The Fate of Ophelia"	Taylor Swift		Wer liebt gewinnt	Daniela Alfinito	
16 January	"The Fate of Ophelia"	Taylor Swift		Alter Bridge	Alter Bridge	
23 January	"The Fate of Ophelia"	Taylor Swift		Neujahrskonzert 2026 – New Year's Concert	Vienna Philharmonic and Yannick Nézet-Séguin	
30 January	"The Fate of Ophelia"	Taylor Swift		Megadeth	Megadeth	
6 February	"Where Is My Husband!"	Raye		Dahoam	Chris Steger	
13 February	"DTMF"	Bad Bunny		Debí Tirar Más Fotos	Bad Bunny	
20 February	"DTMF"	Bad Bunny		Debí Tirar Más Fotos	Bad Bunny	
27 February	"Lush Life"	Zara Larsson		Prizefighter	Mumford & Sons	
6 March	"Lush Life"	Zara Larsson		Deadline	Blackpink	
13 March	"Lush Life"	Zara Larsson		Kiss All the Time. Disco, Occasionally.	Harry Styles	
20 March	"Babydoll"	Dominic Fike		Liebe Glaube Monster	Unheilig	
27 March	"Babydoll"	Dominic Fike		Arirang	BTS	
3 April	"Babydoll"	Dominic Fike		Arirang	BTS	
10 April	"Babydoll"	Dominic Fike		Arirang	BTS	
17 April	"Babydoll"	Dominic Fike		Arirang	BTS	
24 April	"Beauty and a Beat"	Justin Bieber featuring Nicki Minaj		Arirang	BTS	
1 May	"Beauty and a Beat"	Justin Bieber featuring Nicki Minaj		Öha	DJ Ötzi	
8 May	"Beauty and a Beat"	Justin Bieber featuring Nicki Minaj		Hit Me Hard and Soft	Billie Eilish	
15 May	"Beauty and a Beat"	Justin Bieber featuring Nicki Minaj		24/7	Maite Kelly	
22 May	"Bangaranga"	Dara		Poppstar	Ikkimel	
29 May	"Bangaranga"	Dara		Stammtischparolen	Tream & Treamiboii	
5 June	"Bangaranga"	Dara		Trink aus! Wir müssen gehen	Die Toten Hosen	
12 June	"I Knew It, I Knew You"	Taylor Swift		Forever	RAF Camora	
19 June	"Gut Genug"	KitschKrieg, Blumengarten and Shirin David		You Seem Pretty Sad for a Girl So in Love	Olivia Rodrigo	
26 June	"Dai Dai"	Shakira and Burna Boy		You Seem Pretty Sad for a Girl So in Love	Olivia Rodrigo	
3 July	"Dai Dai"	Shakira and Burna Boy		The Wow! Signal	Muse	
10 July	"Dai Dai"	Shakira and Burna Boy		Confessions II	Madonna	
17 July	"Dai Dai"	Shakira and Burna Boy		Foreign Tongues	The Rolling Stones	
24 July	"Dai Dai"	Shakira and Burna Boy		Daughter from Hell	Gracie Abrams	
31 July	"Dai Dai"	Shakira and Burna Boy		Lounge Musik	Pashanim	
7 August	"Dai Dai"	Shakira and Burna Boy		Petal	Ariana Grande	
14 August	"Dai Dai"	Shakira and Burna Boy		This & That	Stray Kids	
21 August	"Dai Dai"	Shakira and Burna Boy		This & That	Stray Kids	
28 August	"Dai Dai"	Shakira and Burna Boy		Lederhosen Bua	Mountain Crew	
4 September	"Dai Dai"	Shakira and Burna Boy		This & That	Stray Kids	
11 September	"Dai Dai"	Shakira and Burna Boy		This & That	Stray Kids	
18 September	"Dai Dai"	Shakira and Burna Boy		This & That	Stray Kids	
25 September	"Dai Dai"	Shakira and Burna Boy		Eins	Nockis	
2 October	"Patient Zero"	Taylor Swift		Schatzhauser	Reinhard Mey	
9 October	"Patient Zero"	Taylor Swift		Rubber Soul	The Beatles	
16 October	"Patient Zero"	Taylor Swift		∞ + 1	Bilderbuch	
23 October	"Housewife"	Tate McRae		Aus dem Koffer	Laurent Nikolaus	
30 October	"Housewife"	Tate McRae		Levi Did It	Bunt	
6 November	"Housewife"	Tate McRae		Perfecth	Queens of the Stone Age	
13 November	"Housewife"	Tate McRae		Queen: Budapest	Queen	
20 November	"Last Christmas"	Wham!		Carnaval de Luz	U2	
