= KitschKrieg =

German music trio

- Origin: Berlin, Germany
- Genres: Hip hop; pop
- Years active: 2015–present
- Labels: BMG; Sony
- Members: Christoph Erkes; Christian Yun-Song Meyerholz; Nicole Schettler
- Website: kitschkrieg.de

KitschKrieg is a German music production group from Berlin and was formed in 2015 by Christoph Erkes (Fizzle), Christian Yun-Song Meyerholz (Fiji Kris), and Nicole Schettler (°awhodat°). They are best known for the single "Gut Genug" in collaboration with Blumengarten and Shirin David, the first German-language record to enter the U.S. Billboard chart in the 21st century.

== History ==
The trio was founded in 2015. The members first met in Berlin at the end of 2014. They achieved a breakthrough with "Knöcheltief" by Trettmann and Gzuz. Their second single "Standard" reached the top of the German singles charts, earning a platinum record in Germany and gold status in Austria.

On August 7, 2020, their debut album KitschKrieg was released. KitschKrieg reached number one on the German singles chart for the second time, while the album itself debuted at number three on the German album chart.

They released their second album, KitschKrieg Zwei on May 22, 2026.

== Discography ==
=== Studio albums ===
List of studio albums, with selected chart positions
Title	Album details	Peak chart positions		
Title	Album details	GER	AUT	SWI
KitschKrieg	Released: 7 August 2020; Label: SoulForce, BMG; Formats: Cassette, LP, digital download, streaming	3	7	6
German Engineering 1	Released: 28 July 2023; Label: SoulForce, BMG; Formats: LP, digital download, streaming	—	—	—
German Engineering Zwei	Released: 6 December 2024; Label: SoulForce, BMG; Formats: LP, digital download, streaming	—	—	—
KitschKrieg Zwei	Released: 5 June 2026; Label: SoulForce, Four, Sony Music; Formats: Cassette, LP, digital download, streaming	20	69	67

=== Collaborative releases ===
- #DIY (with Trettmann) (2017)
- Trettmann (with Trettmann) (2019)
- Insomnia (with Trettmann) (2023)
- London's Calling (with Dré Six) (2025)

=== Singles ===
==== As lead artist ====
List of singles with selected chart positions, certifications and associated albums
Title	Year	Peak chart positions					Certifications	Album
Title	Year	GER	AUT	SWI	US Dance	WW	Certifications	Album
"Standard" (featuring Trettmann, Gringo, Ufo361 and Gzuz)	2018	1	2	18	—	—	BVMI: Platinum; IFPI AUT: Gold	KitschKrieg
"5 Minuten" (featuring Cro, AnnenMayKantereit and Trettmann)	2019	10	13	38	—	—	BVMI: Gold	KitschKrieg
"International Criminal" (featuring Bonez MC and Vybz Kartel)	2020	6	5	23	—	—		KitschKrieg
"Unterwegs" (featuring Jamule)	2020	1	6	17	—	—	BVMI: Platinum	KitschKrieg
"Aua, oh oh, Gringo ist sauer" (featuring Gringo)	2020	64	—	—	—	—		Non-album single
"Gut Genug" (featuring Blumengarten and Shirin David or Skepta)	2026	1	1	2	10	124		KitschKrieg Zwei

==== As featured artist ====
List of singles with selected chart positions, certifications and associated albums
Title	Year	Peak chart positions			Certifications	Album
Title	Year	GER	AUT	SWI	Certifications	Album
"10419" (Cro featuring Trettmann and KitschKrieg)	2018	24	29	78	IFPI AUT: Gold	Non-album single
