= Objectification =

Treating persons as objects

In social philosophy, objectification is the act of treating a person as an object or a thing. Sexual objectification, the act of treating a person as a mere object of sexual desire, is a subset of objectification, as is self-objectification, the objectification of one's self. In Marxism, the objectification of social relationships is discussed as "reification".

== Definitions ==
According to Martha Nussbaum, a person is objectified if one or more of the following properties are applied to them:

1. Instrumentality – treating the person as a tool for another's purposes
2. Denial of autonomy – treating the person as lacking in autonomy or self-determination
3. Inertness – treating the person as lacking in agency or activity
4. Fungibility – treating the person as interchangeable with (other) objects
5. Violability – treating the person as lacking in boundary integrity and violable, "as something that it is permissible to break up, smash, break into."
6. Ownership – treating the person as though they can be owned, bought, or sold (such as slavery)
7. Denial of subjectivity – treating the person as though there is no need for concern for their experiences or feelings

Rae Langton proposed three more properties to be added to Nussbaum's list:

1. Reduction to body – the treatment of a person as identified with their body, or body parts
2. Reduction to appearance – the treatment of a person primarily in terms of how they look, or how they appear to the senses
3. Silencing – the treatment of a person as if they are silent, lacking the capacity to speak

== Arguments ==
Nussbaum found the general understanding of objectification was too simplistic to be useful as a normative concept to evaluate the moral implications of sexualization of women. She attempts to remedy this by distinguishing between benign and harmful forms of objectification in different circumstances relative to sex. Nussbaum considers objectification not just significant when considering sexuality, which has been discussed at length, but also an important component of the Marxist view on capitalism and slavery. She argues that not all forms of objectification are necessarily inherently negative, and that objectification is not necessarily a foregone conclusion when one of the seven properties is present.

According to Immanuel Kant's theories, sexual desire is inherently objectifying, as a strong sexual urge includes a desire to engulf another person for sexual satisfaction. This desire manifests as a desire to control the target's behaviour to secure one's own satisfaction, effectively denying the target's autonomy. The intensity of sexual desire also reduces subjectivity by drowning out consideration of the target's thoughts or feelings in the pursuit of one's own satisfaction, reducing other people to a set of body parts intended to provide gratification. In short, sexual objectification is a general feature of sexuality, in that the involved parties eagerly desire both to objectify and be objectified.

Catharine MacKinnon and Andrea Dworkin adopt Kant's understanding of sex as inherently objectifying, but disagree that participants are objectifiers and objectified in similar proportion; rather, it is asymmetrical. Because sexuality exists within a larger social and culture context and men and women are not granted power equally within that context, this heavily influences the dynamic. According to MacKinnon and Dworkin, male sexuality is expressed dominantly via objectifying others, while female sexuality is expressed submissively via accepting objectification or engaging in self-objectification. In this context, women are more vulnerable to violability and lack of subjectivity and autonomy. MacKinnon and Dworkin ignore personal histories and psychologies that Nussbaum considers equally morally important to the construction of male and female sexualities.

While male gaze is one of the main enablers of self-objectification, social media is a medium that heavily promotes and enforces self-objectification, especially in women. Women post selfies on social media from camera angles that typify the male gaze perspective, while the comments section provides a forum for viewers to voice disapproval or praise. Positive feedback brings a sense of validation to women who post these selfies and reinforces the behaviour.

== Feminist objectification theory ==
The objectification theory proposed by Barbara Fredrickson and Tomi-Ann Roberts analyzes the female body with consideration to the psychology of women and gender. They assert that objectifying a woman or a girl can cause an increased feeling of anxiety or self-awareness in her, thus affecting her mental health. As a result of this objectification, the target adopts the status that society has given to her as her primary view of herself. In their words: "Perhaps the most profound and pervasive of these experiences is the disruption in the flow of consciousness that results as many girls and women internalize the culture's practices of objectification and habitually monitor their bodies' appearance."

The pressure of this external perspective can lead to body monitoring and obsessive eating patterns, eventually resulting in feelings of shame or anxiety. According to Fredrickson and Roberts, newer waves of feminists and scholars have recontextualized the female body in a sociocultural perspective, emphasizing its sociocultural representation over its biological role. They argue that the one conceptualization should not overshadow the other, as both combine to form the social construction of female body image.

== Intersectionality and transgender experiences ==
Sexual objectification experiences can vary according to an individual's intersectional identity markers. Utilizing an intersectional approach can deepen the understandings of objectification constructs pertaining to transgender identities. Transgender individuals experience unique challenges during the interpretation of their identity.

Mirella Flores argues that prior explorations into the topic of objectification have been primarily focused on the experiences of cisgender people. Transgender individuals have been excluded from the discourse of objectification as their expressed gender has been historically invalidated. For example, the traditional heteronormativity displayed in the field of psychology has previously enabled the conceptualization of gender non-conformity as a mental disorder. Furthermore, representations of transgender individuals in the media have portrayed them as comic relief, perpetuating transphobia, and further stigmatizing transgender individuals. Sexual orientation standards are inserted into social representations of gender as either masculine or feminine and this gender binary has been propagated through the media, peers, family, and other socio-cultural channels. Through objectification and social representation, exaggerated body image ideals associated with masculinity and femininity encourage the objectification of one's body in order to adhere to these socio-cultural appearance ideals. Although the theory of objectification was originally used to explain how the female body is reduced to its appearance, it can be used to analyze how transgender individuals approximate these ideals to be consistent with their gender.

The low level of social acceptance of transgender individuals provokes devaluation and stigmatization. Transgender individuals may internalize societal appearance ideals through body monitoring and comparison in order to legitimize their gender identity. Some transgender individuals feel as if they must adopt the binary body image and act towards it in order to fit into societal standards. Objectification ignores gender identity and categorizes individuals based on the ideal expression of gender which affects transitioned men and transitioned women. Objectification becomes a problem and solution for individuals attempting to affirm their gender identity and expression through social recognition. The ideal male physical attractiveness includes the portrayal of muscle and robustness and transgender men can attempt to conform to the standard through compulsive exercise and steroid injection. Transgender women experience similar objectification as cisgender women do according to the reduction of one's self to a mere hypersexualized body. Transgender individuals may attempt to affirm their gender identity through illegal or unsafe practices such as using silicone injections that eventually results in harmful health consequences. Furthermore, transgender individuals may seek gender affirmation through sex work, increasing the risk of sexually transmitted diseases. The discrepancy of appearance (e.g., height and body structure) may impede transgender individuals' alignment with their gender identity and they do not feel as if they fit the social standards even after medical interventions. Transgender individuals may internalize the negative stereotypes perpetuated through sexual objectification such as "transgender prostitute" which has been found to induce stereotype affirming behaviors. Internalization of negative stereotypes have been linked to low self-esteem, devaluation, feelings of worthlessness and in the worst case, suicide.

== See also ==
- Idolatry
