= Douglas Holding =

Former German conglomerate

Douglas Holding AG
- Type: Aktiengesellschaft
- Industry: Retailing
- Founded: 1971
- Defunct: 2017
- Fate: Absorbed by subsidiary Douglas GmbH
- Headquarters: Düsseldorf, Germany
- Area served: Europe
- Key people: Dr. Henning Kreke (Chairman)
- Revenue: €3.44 billion (2012)
- Operating income: −€89.1 million (2012)
- Net income: −109.9 million (2012)
- Total assets: €1.528 billion (2012)
- Number of employees: 24,221 (2012)
- Website: douglas-holding.com

Douglas Holding was a German retail group based in Düsseldorf which included subsidiaries perfumery chain Douglas GmbH, confectionery chain Hussel, bookstore chain Thalia Buchhandel, and women's fashion store chain AppelrathCüpper. After the takeover by financial investor Advent International, Douglas Holding was delisted in 2013 , and the conglomerate was gradually split into its individual companies.

In June 2015, CVC Capital Partners agreed to purchase the controlling stake in the company from Advent International in a deal which reportedly valued Douglas at around 2.8 billion euros.

On 20 March 2017, Douglas Holding AG was dissolved by merging with Douglas GmbH.

== History ==
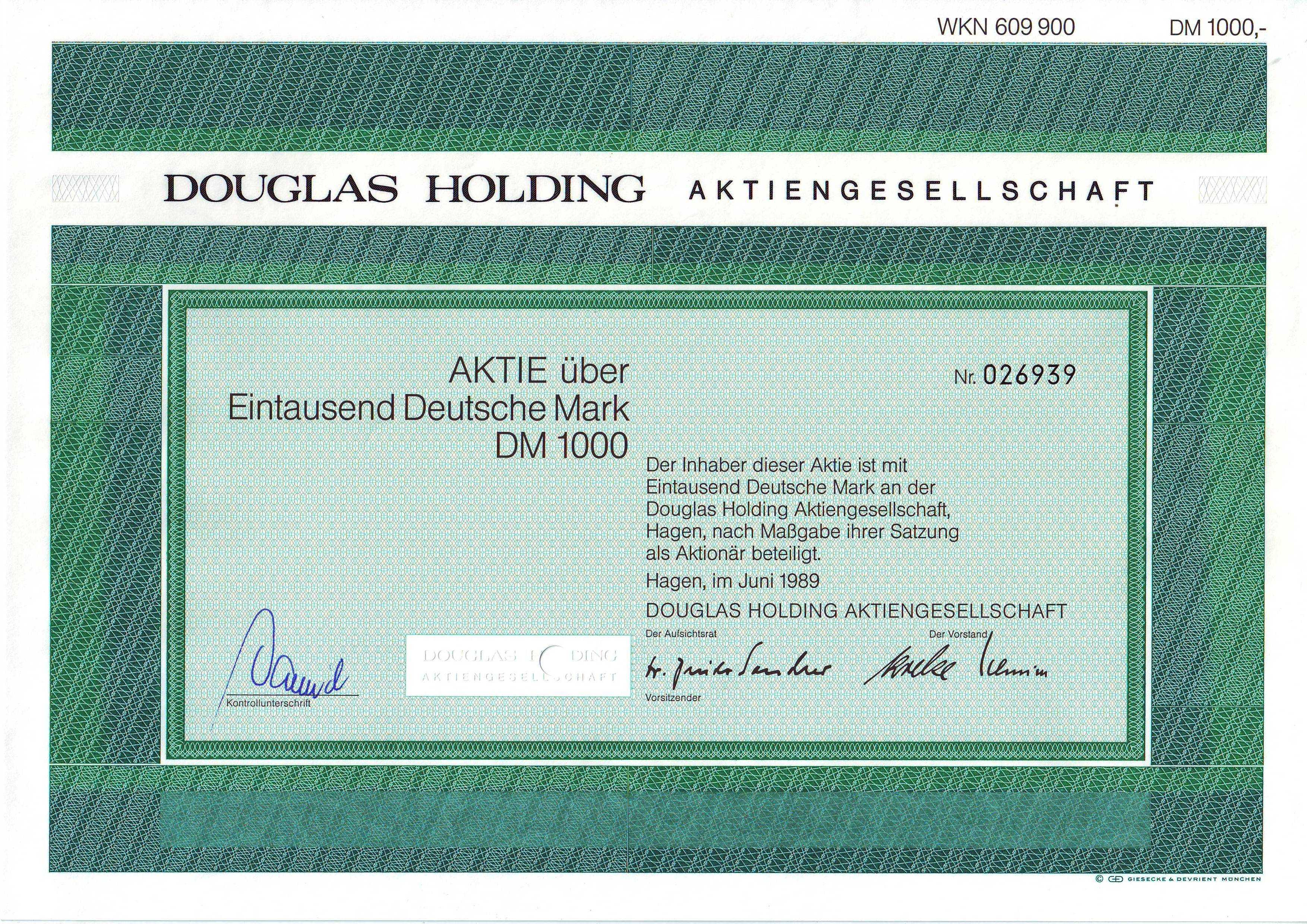
Share of the Douglas Holding AG, issued June 1989

The roots of the company date back to 1821, when the perfume and soap factory J.S. Douglas Söhne was founded in Hamburg. In 1863, the first Christ subsidiary was founded. In 1910, the first Douglas perfumery was opened in Hamburg. The actual predecessor of the Douglas Holding AG, the Hussel Süßwarenfilialbetrieb GmbH, was founded in 1949, and transformed into a joint stock company in 1962. In 1969, it acquired the Parfümerie Douglas, which soon became the main pillar of the corporation, which became known as Hussel Holding AG in 1976. In 1989, the company changed its name to Douglas Holding AG.

In December 2012, Advent International led a public-to-private buyout of Douglas in a deal worth 1.5 billion euros. The deal was successfully managed by board members Henning Kreke (CEO) and Burkhard Bamberger (CFO). The Kreke family that founded Douglas retained a twenty percent stake in the company.

Advent International refocused Douglas on its primary perfume and cosmetics lines, spinning off the company's other brands: Confectioner Hussel was sold to Emeram Capital Partners in March 2014. Jewelry retailer Christ was sold to 3i Group in October 2014. Womanswear retailer AppelrathCüpper was sold to OpCapita in May 2016. Book retailer Thalia was sold to the Herder family, a German family of publishers, in July 2016. Douglas bought French Perfumery Chain Nocibé in 2014.
