= Shirin David =

German rapper and singer (born 1995)

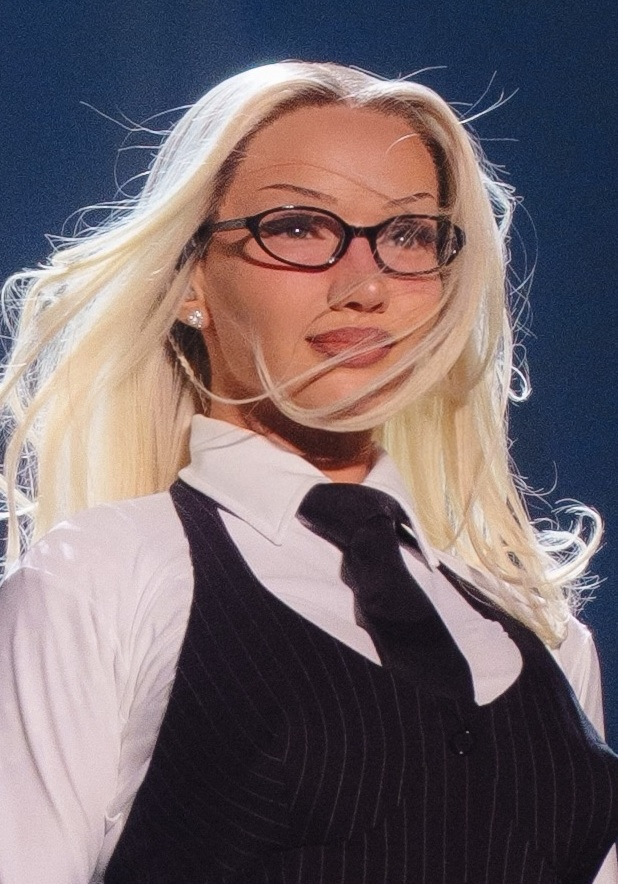
- David in 2025

Background information
- Born: Barbara Shirin Davidavicius; 11 April 1995 (age 31); Hamburg, Germany
- Genres: Pop-Rap; R&B; Pop
- Occupations: Rapper; singer; YouTuber
- Years active: 2014–present
- Labels: Juicy Money; Universal; Vertigo; Capitol

Barbara Shirin Davidavicius (born 11 April 1995), known professionally as Shirin David (German: [ʃɪˈʁiːn ˈdeːvɪd]), is a German rapper, singer and songwriter, entrepreneur, and head of music label Juicy Money. Initially known for creating video content on the online platform YouTube, David gained notoriety as a singer in 2015 when she was featured on the single "Du liebst mich nicht". Since then, she has primarily continued making music as a rapper. David has released three full-length albums: Supersize (2019), Bitches brauchen Rap (2021), and Schlau aber blond (2025), with the first and third reaching number one on the German Album Top 100.

== Early life ==
Barbara Shirin Davidavicius was born in Hamburg to a Lithuanian mother and an Iranian father. She spent the first years of her life in Lithuania. At a young age, she began to play the piano, later followed by the violin and oboe. At the same time, she took dance lessons at the ballet school of the Hamburg Ballet. She also studied at the Hamburg Youth Opera Academy.

== Career ==
=== 2015–2018: YouTube channel and Deutschland sucht den Superstar judge ===
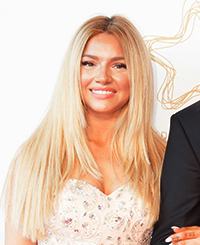
David in 2015

She started her YouTube channel in March 2014. As of July 2021, she was the 63rd most subscribed channel in Germany with over 2.7 million subscribers. In 2015, she reached the top 10 of the German Charts as a feature on German R&B singer Ado Kojo's song "Du liebst mich nicht", a cover of the song with the same name by German rapper Sabrina Setlur. In February 2016, it was reported that David had cancelled her contract with YouTube network TubeOne Networks, who had made her famous. In 2017, she was one of four judges at Deutschland sucht den Superstar, the German version of American Idol. She moved to Berlin in 2018, having lived in Cologne for more than three years previously.

=== 2019–2021: Supersize and Bitches brauchen Rap ===
In January 2019, David released her first official single, "Orbit", which was later one of the tracks of her debut album Supersize. In February, her second single, "Gib ihm", was released, reaching number one in the German Charts. Five weeks after the release of "Gib ihm", David was featured on the track "Affalterbach" by German rapper Shindy. About two weeks later, David released the song "ICE", which was followed by "Fliegst du mit" in May. At the end of June 2019, she published the single "On Off" featuring Maître Gims, which was followed by the single "Brillis" in August. On 20 September 2019, she released both the single "Nur mit dir" featuring German singer Xavier Naidoo and her album Supersize, which peaked at number one on the German Album Charts. She became the first national female solo hip-hop artist to reach number one with an album as well as the first female hip hop act to top the charts with her debut album.

In a YouTube video released in September 2019, David announced her second perfume was set to come out in October 2019, after she had already sold a perfume as part of a collaboration with dm-drogerie since 2014. The newest fragrance is a collaboration with Douglas and a first sample of it is found in the limited content box to her album Supersize.

After David had already released two merchandising collections in November 2016 and June 2017 in collaboration with Holymesh, she released a pair of slippers with "GIB IHM" printed on in April 2020. David released the single "90-60-111" on 24 April 2020 which became her second number one-hit in Germany, as well as her first number one-single in Austria. She also released a limited merchandise collection for the single. Two weeks after the release of "90-60-111", David was featured on the track "Conan x Xenia" by German rapper Haftbefehl. Later in 2020, she released her song "Hoe's Up G's Down". Later, she released the song "Never Know" with German rapper Luciano, which debuted in the top 10 in Germany, Austria, and Switzerland. Her second studio album, Bitches brauchen Rap, was released on 19 November 2021.

=== 2023–present: The Voice of Germany coach, Schlau aber blond, and "Gut Genug" ===
In 2023, David was featured as a coach on the season 13 of The Voice of Germany. In July 2024, David released her single "Bauch Beine Po", which reached number one on the German charts. It was her 7th number one hit in Germany, making her the first female artist worldwide with 7 number one singles on the German charts.

David released her third album, Schlau aber blond, on 14 February 2025. The album followed Supersize in reaching number one on the German album chart. In addition, she launched her own beauty care line, shirin beauty, in April 2025. In late 2025, David returned as a coach on The Voice of Germany, for season 15, after a one-season hiatus, becoming the first female coach on the show to bring two artists to the final. She also returned in late 2026 for season 16, marking her third season as a coach.

David co-wrote the single "Gut Genug" with the production group KitschKrieg and the music duo Blumengarten, which was released on 22 May 2026. The song went viral as an internet meme on social media platforms, peaking atop Ö3 Austria Top 40 and the German Singles Chart, giving David her eighth number-one single in the country. In the song, David provides a verse that revolves around her insecurities, which was criticized by critics and online users, with YouTube users demanding a version without her.

== Endeavors ==
=== Perfume line ===
In 2017, Shirin David brought her own perfume out called "Shirin David — Created by the Community" in cooperation with dm-drogerie. Her fans had the chance to vote for their personal preferences during a specific time and created the perfume as a community. For her second perfume, "Shirin David — Created by Shirin", she cooperated with Douglas.

- 2017: Shirin David — Created by the Community (in cooperation with dm-drogerie)
- 2019: Shirin David — Created by Shirin (in cooperation with Douglas)

=== DirTea ===
In late summer 2021, David launched a line of ice tea products called DirTea (homophone of dirty). The initial launch included the flavors Candy Shop (Cotton Candy), Wet Peach (Peach) and Busty Blueberry (Blueberry).

Following her release of her second album Bitches brauchen Rap, DirTea released a sparkling edition (with alcohol), including the two flavors Juicy Mango (Mango) and Candy Shop. In 2022, a zero-sugar edition was made available. DirTea products are available in Germany, Austria and Switzerland, including online and in specifically chosen retailers.

Flavors	Type				
Flavors	DirTea	Extra DirTea	DirTea ZERO	DirTea Energy	DirTea with Benefits
Busty Blueberry	Yes	No	No	No	No
Candy Shop	Yes	Yes	No	No	No
Wet Peach	Yes	No	Yes	Yes	No
Lemon From Heaven	No	No	Yes	No	No
Juicy Mango	Yes	Yes	No	No	No
Juicy Mango Coconut	No	No	No	Yes	No
Icy Cactus	No	No	No	Yes	No
Glow	No	No	No	No	Yes
Boost	No	No	No	No	Yes
Reload	No	No	No	No	Yes

=== Barbara — Becoming Shirin David ===
A documentary based on David's early career, Barbara — Becoming Shirin David, was released by Netflix in 2026.

== Discography ==
=== Studio albums ===
Title	Album details	Peak chart positions		
Title	Album details	GER	AUT	SWI
Supersize	Released: 19 September 2019; Label: Vertigo Berlin, Universal; Formats: CD, digital download, streaming, box set	1	2	3
Bitches brauchen Rap	Released: 19 November 2021; Label: Juicy Money Records; Formats: CD, digital download, streaming, box set	3	3	4
Schlau aber blond	Released: 14 February 2025; Label: Juicy Money Records; Formats: CD, digital download, streaming, box set	1	2	7

=== Singles ===
==== As lead artist ====
Title	Year	Peak chart positions			Certifications	Album
Title	Year	GER	AUT	SWI	Certifications	Album
"Orbit"	2019	5	9	14		Supersize
"Gib ihm"	2019	1	3	9	BVMI: Platinum; IFPI AUT: Platinum	Supersize
"Ice"	2019	8	8	28		Supersize
"Fliegst du mit"	2019	8	9	15		Supersize
"On Off" (featuring Maître Gims)	2019	3	5	6	BVMI: Gold; IFPI AUT: Gold	Supersize
"Brillis"	2019	4	14	15		Supersize
"Nur mit dir" (featuring Xavier Naidoo)	2019	8	13	11		Supersize
"90-60-111"	2020	1	1	10	BVMI: Gold; IFPI AUT: Platinum	Bitches brauchen Rap (Re-Edition)
"Hoes Up G's Down"	2020	6	9	13	IFPI AUT: Gold	Bitches brauchen Rap (Re-Edition)
"Ich darf das"	2021	1	2	3	BVMI: Gold; IFPI AUT: Platinum	Bitches brauchen Rap
"Lieben wir"	2021	1	6	6	BVMI: Gold; IFPI AUT: Platinum	Bitches brauchen Rap
"Be a Hoe/Break a Hoe" (featuring Kitty Kat)	2021	1	7	16	IFPI AUT: Gold	Bitches brauchen Rap
"Schlechtes Vorbild"	2021	13	19	16		Bitches brauchen Rap
"Lächel doch mal"	2023	8	15	32		Bitches brauchen Rap (Re-Edition)
"Bauch Beine Po"	2024	1	1	3	BVMI: Platinum; IFPI AUT: Platinum	Schlau aber blond
"It Girl" (featuring Sampagne)	2024	2	2	16		Schlau aber blond
"Küss mich doch"	2024	37	—	—		Schlau aber blond
"Atzen & Barbies" (featuring Ski Aggu)	2025	3	6	20		Schlau aber blond

==== As featured artist ====
Title	Year	Peak chart positions			Certifications	Album
Title	Year	GER	AUT	SWI	Certifications	Album
"Du liebst mich nicht" (Ado Kojo featuring Shirin David)	2015	6	8	20	BVMI: Gold	Reise X
"Affalterbach" (Shindy featuring Shirin David)	2019	3	3	10	BVMI: Gold	Drama
"Conan × Xenia" (Haftbefehl featuring Shirin David)	2020	4	12	19	IFPI AUT: Gold	Das weisse Album
"Never Know" (Luciano featuring Shirin David)	2020	3	4	7	BVMI: Gold; IFPI AUT: Gold	Exot
"Atemlos durch die Nacht" (10 Year Anniversary Version) (Helene Fischer featuring Shirin David)	2023	1	9	14		Non-album single
"Wer liebt dich jetzt ?" (Nico Santos featuring Shirin David)	2025	18	34	99		SANTOS
"LDNB" (AK Ausserkontrolle featuring Shirin David)	2026	2	15	27		Non-album single
"Gut Genug" (KitschKrieg featuring Blumengarten, Shirin David)	2026	1	1	2		KitschKrieg Zwei
"Mo' Money Mo' Haters" (Summer Cem featuring Shirin David)	2026	2	4	5		Non-album single

=== Other charted songs ===
Title	Year	Peak chart positions			Album
Title	Year	GER	AUT	SWI	Album
"NDA's" (with Shindy)	2021	14	22	28	Bitches brauchen Rap
"Babsi Bars"	2021	—	—	40	Bitches brauchen Rap
"FSK16"	2025	63	—	—	Schlau aber blond
"Iconic"	2025	—	43	—	Schlau aber blond

== Filmography ==
=== Film ===
Year	Title	Role	Notes
2015	Fack ju Göhte 2	Girl on Tubing Station	Mini role
2015	Kartoffelsalat – Nicht fragen!	Heinke	

=== Television ===
Year	Title	Role	Notes
2017	Deutschland sucht den Superstar	Judge (Herself)	Season 14
2021	Wer stiehlt mir die Show?	Participant (Herself)	Season 2
2023	Drag Race Germany	Guest Judge (Herself)	Season 1, Episode 1
2023	The Voice of Germany	Judge (Herself)	Season 13
2025	The Voice of Germany	Judge (Herself)	Season 15

== Tours ==
- 2023: Shirin David Live Tour
- 2025: Schlau aber Blond Tour

== Awards and nominations ==
Year	Award	Nomination	Work	Result	Ref.
2015	Bravo Otto Awards	Social Media-Star	Herself	Nominated	
2017	Place To B Awards	YouTube	Herself	Won	
2018	Duftstars German Perfume Awards	Audience Award Women	Perfume "Created by the Community"	Won	
2019	Place To B Awards	Special Honor	Herself	Won	
2019	Bambi	Shootingstar	Herself	Won	
2019	Hiphop.de Awards	Best Newcomer	Herself	Nominated	
2019	Hiphop.de Awards	Best Song National	Gib ihm	Nominated	
2019	Hiphop.de Awards	Best Video National	Gib ihm	Nominated	
2019	Hiphop.de Awards	Best Line	Gib ihm	Nominated	
2020	MTV Europe Music Awards	Best German Act	Herself	Nominated	
2020	Bravo Otto Awards	Hip-Hop national	Herself	Bronze	
2020	Hiphop.de Awards	Best Song National	90-60-111	Nominated	
2020	Duftstars German Perfume Awards	Lifestyle Award Women	Perfume "Created by Shirin"	Nominated	
2021	Price for Popculture	Favourite Female Artist	Herself	Nominated	
2021	1LIVE Krone Awards	Best Female Artist	Herself	Nominated	
2021	Bravo Otto Awards	Hip-Hop national	Herself	Silver	
2021	Hiphop.de Awards	Best Album National	Bitches brauchen Rap	Nominated	
2021	Hiphop.de Awards	Best Song National	Be a Hoe/Break a Hoe (feat. Kitty Kat)	Nominated	
2021	Hiphop.de Awards	Best Beat of the Year	Be a Hoe/Break a Hoe (feat. Kitty Kat)	Nominated	
2021	Hiphop.de Awards	Best Line	Babsi Bars	Nominated	
2021	Hiphop.de Awards	Artist of the Year	Herself	Nominated	
2021	Hiphop.de Awards	Best Rap-Solo-Act National	Herself	Nominated	
2022	German Influencer Awards	Music (MEGA)	Herself	Won	
2022	Hiphop.de Awards	Artist of the Year	Herself	Nominated	
2023	Price for Popculture	Favourite Video	Lächel Doch Mal	Won	
2023	Berlin Marketingprice	Honorary Award	Herself	Won	
2023	Bravo Otto Awards	Rap/Hip-Hop national	Herself	Bronze	
2023	Hiphop.de Awards	Best Video National	Lächel Doch Mal	Nominated	
2023	Hiphop.de Awards	Best Line	Lächel Doch Mal	Nominated	
2023	Hiphop.de Awards	Beat of the Year	Heidi	Nominated	
2023	Hiphop.de Awards	Best Live-Act National	Herself	Nominated	
2023	Hiphop.de Awards	Artist of the Year	Herself	Won	
2023	Hiphop.de Awards	Best Solo-Act National	Herself	Nominated	
2024	MTV Europe Music Awards	Best German Act	Herself	Nominated	
2024	Bambi	Music National	Herself	Won	
2024	Polyton Awards	Wildcard	Atemlos durch die Nacht (10 Year Anniversary Version) [with Helene Fischer]	Won	
2024	TikTok Awards	Artist of the Year	Herself	Won	
2024	Bravo Otto Awards	Rap/Hip-Hop National	Herself	Silver	
2024	Hiphop.de Awards	Best Song National	Bauch Peine Po	Nominated	
2024	Hiphop.de Awards	Best Video National	Bauch Peine Po	Nominated	
2024	Hiphop.de Awards	Best Live-Act National	Herself	Nominated	
2024	Hiphop.de Awards	Best Solo-Act National	Herself	Nominated	
2024	1LIVE Krone Awards	Best Song	Bauch Peine Po	Nominated	
2025	Price for Popculture	Favourite Song	Bauch Peine Po	Nominated	
2025	Price for Popculture	Favourite Artist	Herself	Nominated	
2025	1LIVE Krone Awards	Best Female Artist	Herself	Nominated	
2025	Hiphop.de Awards	Best Live-Act National	Herself	Nominated	
2026	Polyton Awards	Pop	Schlau aber blond	Nominated	
2026	London Music Video Awards	Dance	Lächel Doch Mal	Won	
