= Wahlstedt =

- Town
- Coat of arms

- Location of Wahlstedt within Segeberg district
- Interactive map of Wahlstedt
- Location within Germany Location within Schleswig-Holstein
- Coordinates: 53°57′N 10°13′E
- Country: Germany
- State: Schleswig-Holstein
- District: Segeberg

Government
  - Mayor: Matthias-Ch. Bonse (CDU)

Area
  - Total: 15.75 km^{2} (6.08 sq mi)
- Elevation: 47 m (154 ft)

Population (2025-12-31)
  - Total: 9,749
  - Density: 619.0/km^{2} (1,603/sq mi)
- Time zone: UTC+01:00 (CET)
  - Summer (DST): UTC+02:00 (CEST)
- Postal codes: 23812
- Dialling codes: 04554
- Vehicle registration: SE
- Website: www.wahlstedt.de

Wahlstedt (German pronunciation: [ˈvaːlʃtɛt]; Low German: Wohlsteed) is a town in the district of Segeberg in Schleswig-Holstein, Germany.

== Geography ==
The town lies about 50 km north of Hamburg, 40 km south of Kiel and 30 km west of Lübeck. It is about seven kilometers west of Bad Segeberg on the edge of the Segeberg Forest.

== Politics ==
After the 2003 election, the 19 seats of the Wahlstedt city council are filled by nine CDU members, eight SPD members, and two FDP members.

== Economy ==
The headquarters of German confectionery retailer Hussel is in Wahlstedt.

== International relations ==
Wahlstedt is twinned with:

- Bjerringbro, Denmark (1969–2007)
