= Gut Genug =

2026 single by KitschKrieg, Blumengarten and Shirin David

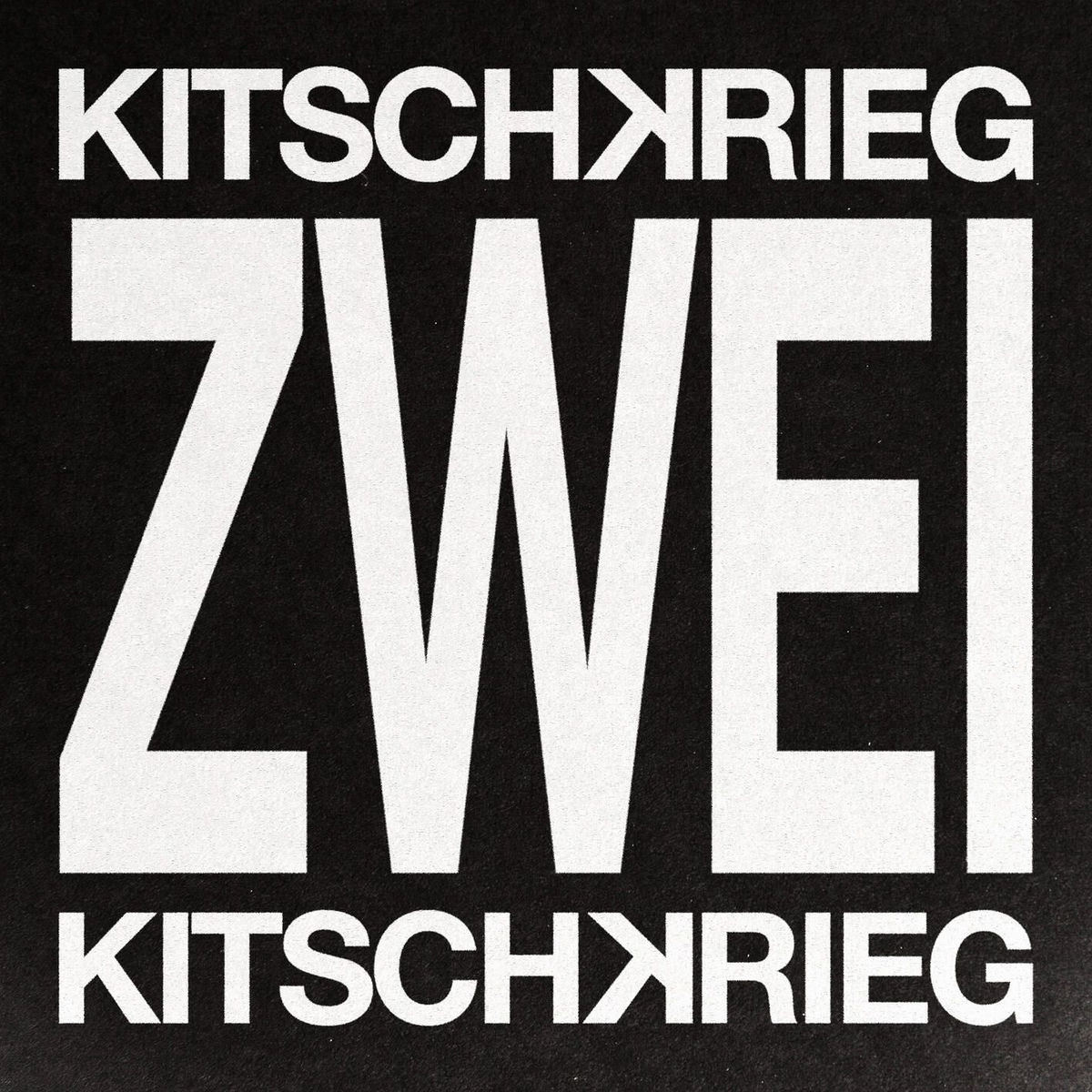

Single by KitschKrieg, Blumengarten and Shirin David

from the album KitschKrieg Zwei
- Language: German
- English title: "Good Enough"
- Released: 22 May 2026
- Genre: Ambient house
- Length: 3:08
- Label: SoulForce
- Songwriters: KitschKrieg; Rayan Djima; Samuel Eickmann; Shirin David; Lucry; Suena; LAAS
- Producer: KitschKrieg

Music video
- "Gut Genug" on YouTube

"Gut genug" ("Good Enough") is a song by German production trio KitschKrieg, music duo Blumengarten and rapper Shirin David. It was released on 22 May 2026 as a single from KitschKrieg's album KitschKrieg Zwei (2026). The song was originally written by Blumengarten, who almost forgot about it until being approached by KitschKrieg. It was originally set for release in January 2026, but was postponed at the request of Blumengarten.

The song went viral on social media platforms in June 2026, primarily TikTok and Instagram Reels, inspired by an internet meme consisting of the song's chorus, "Du bist gut genug" ("You are good enough"). Due to this virality, despite criticism of David's verse, the song peaked atop national charts in their home country, Germany, and in Austria. Their label claims that it was the first German-language record to enter the U.S. Billboard charts in the 21st century. Following this success, the song received two remixes, the first featuring English rapper Skepta and the second featuring Nigerian singer Omah Lay and production trio 225.

== Background and release ==
A collaboration of German artists KitschKrieg, Blumengarten, a music duo consisting of vocalist Rayan Djima and producer Samuel Eickmann, and Shirin David, "Gut genug" was first recorded as a demo by Blumengarten around two years before its official release, initially for their debut album, but as they had no idea on how to complete the song, they stored it in a hard drive. They had nearly forgotten about it until KitschKrieg approached them to record it. It was initially set to release on 29 January 2026, but was postponed at the request of Blumengarten as they wanted to "focus on addressing and dealing with a current issue within their band circle".

"Gut Genug" was officially released on 22 May 2026, as one of the singles for KitschKrieg's studio album KitschKrieg Zwei (2026). Its accompanying music video, entirely in black and white, features Blumengarten member Rayan Djima dancing and singing the line "Du bist gut genug" (You are good enough) in falsetto. In the song, rapper Shirin David provides a verse that revolves around her own insecurities.

== Critical reception ==
Gut Genug
19-second sample of Djima's verse

"Gut Genug" was met with a mostly positive response. Praise went towards Djima's contribution to the song, while Shirin David's verse has been criticized by critics and online users alike, with YouTube users additionally demanding a version without her. A writer from WDR called the song "a pop phenomenon on an endless loop and already one of the summer hits of the year". Maximilian Baran of Plattentests.de stated that track "works surprisingly solidly" as the closer for KitschKrieg Zwei.

Writers from Watson considered Djima to be the main spotlight of the song, contrasting that David "recedes far into the background of the song". They also categorized the song under the term "hopecore". In her review of KitschKrieg Zwei, Magdalena Gregori of laut.de negatively stated that Djima's vocals on the track "really reaches new spheres of annoyance" and that David delivers "unpleasant lines". Responding to the criticism on David's verse, Rayan Djima of Blumengarten stated that "the song wouldn't be what it is today" without her verse.

== Commercial performance and virality ==
"Gut genug" entered the German Singles Chart at number 27. After dropping to 52 in its second week, the song rose to the chart's eighth position in its third week, thus being named the chart's Highest Climber of the week. The song later peaked at number one on the chart in its fourth week, and GfK Entertainment confirmed that it became the most streamed song within a week in 2026. This also gave Shirin David her eighth number-one single in the country, continuing her record of being the female artist with the most number-one singles. It also peaked atop the national chart in Austria.

"Gut genug" became popular outside of Germany in June 2026, particularly among English speakers on TikTok and Instagram Reels, after a clip of Djima's part of the music video gained over 5.5 million views. The song had sparked a trend of memes comparing Rayan's appearance and vocals to Cleveland Jr. from Family Guy and its spin-off The Cleveland Show. The song's lyric "Du bist gut genug" has been misheard in English as "doobie scoot canoe" or "go to school tomorrow". In Norway, the song went viral on social media because the main chorus can also sound like the phrase "Norge skårte mål", meaning "Norway scored a goal", amplified by Norway's appearance in the 2026 FIFA World Cup. The verse Du bist gut genug was selected as a candidate for the German youth word of the year for 2026.

== Remixes ==
A remix version of "Gut Genug", which features English rapper Skepta, was released on 31 July 2026 through Sony Music. The remix was originally teased on Instagram on 29 July. According to Skepta, his main goal while working on the remix was "not to interfere with what was already a hit but to write a verse that makes it an even more liberating listen for those who need it." He had already understood the original's lyrics, as he studied German while in school, and stated that they reminded him of his "Underdog Psychosis" video. Another remix featuring Nigerian singer Omah Lay and production trio 255 was released. That version debuted at number 24 on the TurnTable Top 100 Songs chart, additonally peaking at number one on the Top International Songs chart.

== Charts ==
Chart performance for "Gut genug"
| Chart (2026) | Peak position |
|---|---|
| Austria (Ö3 Austria Top 40) | 1 |
| Belgium (Ultratop 50 Flanders) | 50 |
| Denmark (Tracklisten) | 36 |
| Germany (GfK) | 1 |
| Global 200 (Billboard) | 124 |
| Lithuania Airplay (TopHit) | 29 |
| Luxembourg (Billboard) | 7 |
| Netherlands (Single Top 100) | 61 |
| Nigeria (TurnTable Top 100) | 24 |
| Norway (IFPI Norge) | 49 |
| Suriname (Nationale Top 40) | 3 |
| Sweden Heatseeker (Sverigetopplistan) | 3 |
| Switzerland (Schweizer Hitparade) | 2 |
| Turkey International Airplay (Radiomonitor Türkiye) | 1 |
| UK Video Streaming (Official Charts) | 34 |
| US Hot Dance/Electronic Songs (Billboard) | 10 |

== See also ==
- List of number-one hits of 2026 (Austria)
- List of number-one hits of 2026 (Germany)
