= 4.5-Inch Beach Barrage Rocket =

"Old Faithful"
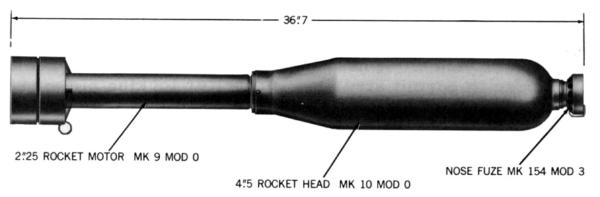
- 4.5-Inch BBR with Mk 9 motor
- Type: Surface-to-surface rocket
- Place of origin: United States

Service history
- Used by: United States Navy

Production history
- Designer: Caltech
- Designed: 1942
- Produced: 1942–1945

Specifications
- Mass: 29 lb (13 kg)
- Length: 30 in (760 mm)
- Diameter: 4.5 in (110 mm)
- Warhead: High explosive
- Warhead weight: 6.5 lb (2.9 kg)
- Engine: Solid-fuel rocket
- Operational range: 1,100 yd (1.0 km)
- Maximum speed: 242 mph (389 km/h)
- Guidance system: None

The 4.5-Inch Beach Barrage Rocket, also known as "Old Faithful", was a 4.5-inch (110 mm) rocket developed and used by the United States Navy during World War II. Originally developed from the "Mousetrap" anti-submarine rocket, it saw widespread use during the war, being replaced by more powerful rockets toward the end of the conflict.

== Development ==
Developed during 1942 by the California Institute of Technology (Caltech), under the direction of Charles Christian Lauritsen, in response to a requirement by the United States Navy for a rocket capable of being launched from landing craft to provide fire support during amphibious landings, the 4.5-Inch BBR was an improved version of the Mousetrap anti-submarine rocket system, using the Mousetrap's Mk 3 rocket motor mated to a 20-pound (9.1 kg) general purpose aerial bomb. An impact fuse was mounted in the nose of the rocket, with an annular fin assembly providing stability. A modified, larger version of the Beach Barrage Rocket, using the Mk 9 rocket motor, was also produced, being introduced into service in late 1944.

== Operational history ==
First test fired on 24 June 1942, further tests in August proved sufficiently successful for the Navy Bureau of Ordnance to place an initial order for 3,000 Beach Barrage Rockets; the weapon was introduced into combat service that November, during the invasion of northern Africa. Fired from 12-round launchers and capable of being fitted with either the standard high explosive or a white phosphorus warhead, approximately 1,600,000 examples of the BBR were built; although the rocket proved inaccurate in service, it was widely used, and was highly regarded by members of the amphibious forces. The effect on the target of the Beach Barrage Rocket was described as being equivalent to that of a barrage from heavy mortars.

The 4.5-Inch BBR also saw use as an improvised ship-to-ship weapon, as well as being launched from ground-based launchers; it is credited with the first ship to be sunk by another purely by rocket attack, occurring near Ormoc in December 1944. Toward the end of the war, the Beach Barrage Rocket was replaced in service by the 5 in (130 mm) High Velocity Spinner Rocket.
