= Sophia Thiel =

German bodybuilder and fitness blogger

- Professional bodybuilder
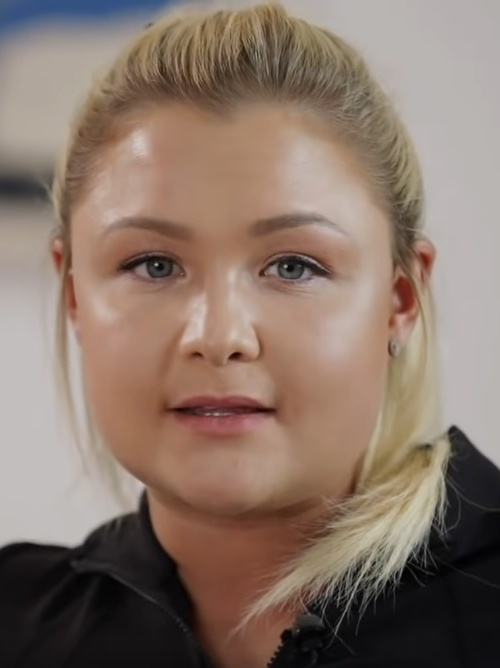
- Thiel in 2019

Personal info
- Born: 13 March 1995 (age 31); Rosenheim, Bavaria, Germany

Best statistics
- Height: 1.72 m (5 ft 7 1/2 in)
- Weight: 88.6 kg (195 lb)

Sophia Laura Maria Thiel (born 13 March 1995 in Rosenheim, Bavaria) is a German female bodybuilder and fitness blogger.

== Life and career ==
Thiel was overweight during her youth. In 2012, she started bodybuilding and lost over 25 kilograms within three years. She runs several social media accounts and offers an online fitness course. In 2015, she participated in TV total Turmspringen and in 2016 and 2017 in Die große ProSieben Völkerball Meisterschaft. From 2017 to 2019, she coached the online contestants on The Biggest Loser Germany and from 2017 to 2019, she appeared in the German docu-soap Fitness Diaries.

Under the brand name "Sophia Thiel", she created a fragrance line, fitness fashion collection, guidebooks and cookbooks.

On 9 January 2019 the first issue of the fitness magazine Sophia Thiel Magazin appeared, published as an offshoot of the magazine Shape by Bauer Media Group. The second issue of the magazine, planned for May 2019, was not published.

Thiel lived in Rosenheim, Upper Bavaria. She moved to Munich in 2018 after breaking up with her boyfriend, who took her to fitness training. In May 2019, she announced in a YouTube video that she was withdrawing from social networks for personal reasons. In February 2021, she reported back online. In April 2021, she spoke for the first time on her YouTube channel about her eating disorder bulimia nervosa and promoted her newly published book dealing with it. Her old books, e.g. Einfach schlank und fit. Mit 120 Rezepten zur Traumfigur, continued to be promoted. In May 2021, she was on the winning team of Wer weiß denn sowas? with Bernhard Hoëcker.

Sophia had her own sports program, but she slipped further and further into an eating disorder in 2021. As of 7 March 2022 the fitness blogger had overcome her eating disorder and appeared to be in good health. The 26-year-old is still a sports lover, but she now prefers to listen to herself rather than the voices in her public environment and on social media.

== Publications ==
- Einfach schlank und fit. Mit 120 Rezepten zur Traumfigur. riva, Munich 2016, ISBN 978-3-7423-0117-8
- Fitness Sweets: Mit 60 kalorienarmen und eiweißreichen süßen Rezepten. riva, Munich 2017, ISBN 978-3-7423-0380-6
- Mit Meal Prep zur Traumfigur: Clever vorkochen, mit Genuss abnehmen. Mit allen meinen persönlichen Tipps und über 60 Rezepten. riva, Munich. 2017. ISBN 978-3-7423-0709-5
- Fit & Stark mit Sophia: Erfolgreich trainieren ohne Geräte. riva, Munich 2018, ISBN 978-3-89883-910-5
- Come back stronger. Meine lange Suche nach mir selbst. ZS publisher 2021, ISBN 978-3-96584-089-8
