= Self-objectification =

Feminist theory

Self-objectification is viewing oneself as an object for use instead of as a person. Self-objectification is a result of objectification, and is commonly discussed in the topic of sex and gender. Both men and women struggle with self-objectification, but it is most commonly seen among women. According to Calogero, self-objectification explains the psychological process by which women internalise others' objectification of their bodies, resulting in them constantly criticizing their own bodies.

== Relationship to objectification ==
Objectification and self-objectification are two different topics, but are closely intertwined. Objectification looks at how society views people (in this case, women) as bodies for someone else's pleasure. This occurs in advertisements where the body but not the face of a woman is shown. These messages put an unrealistic standard on women's bodies, dehumanizing them to an object of visual pleasure, and self-objectification occurs in response. Women start to internalize the message that they are not individual human beings, but objects of beauty, pleasure and play for others, and the begin to view themselves and their bodies as such.

The perpetuation of self-objectification can exhibit itself as a cycle. Objectification leads to self-objectification, which further perpetuates objectification, and the cycle goes on. Both media and social interaction factor into this. Alongside the rise of media’s ubiquity, idealized body shapes and figures are portrayed across billboards, in music videos, on covers of magazines, and a social media. These ideals, taking the form of compounding and ever shifting standards, cause people to inherit destructive and unsustainable views, firmly believing that they must look and act like as women in the media are portrayed, further continuing this self-objectification.

Social interactions contribute as well, as the way people communicate with each other, via comments, facial expressions, or other treatment subtly and subconsciously further objectification. This dynamic is known as appearance related communication. Two types of appearance related communication that have had an effect on the existence of self-objectification are old talk and fat talk; these being where obese and overweight women are commonly criticized by the health industry, and old women can be made to feel useless and "worn out" due to the often-cited associated negative health consequences of their old age.

== Appearance-related communication ==
Fat talk, a term coined by Mimi Nichter, refers to women making comments about their own weight, dieting, or justifications of one's eating or exercising habits. It includes comments such as, "I'm out of shape", or "I'm just eating everything today". Women who engage in fat talk are more likely to struggle with body dissatisfaction, self-objectification, depression, anorexia, bulimia, and other eating disorders.

Old talk refers to negative statements about wrinkles, skin tone, yellowing teeth, and other physical aspects of the natural aging process. Women who engage in old talk are more likely to be dissatisfied with their bodies, engage in self-objectification, have depression and anxiety, and it may even decrease their quality of life and actual lifespan. Both fat and old talk result in higher self-objectification, as women measure themselves against and attempt to reach an unrealistic standard.

== Development ==
The tracking of self-objectification is a multi-layered developmental process that is fueled by the internalization of external standards and supported by both micro-level interpersonal relationships and macro-level societal communication channels.

=== Media and cultural influences ===
Continuous exposure to cultural and media contexts that portray people—especially women—as sexual commodities is the main cause of self-objectification. Analyzes of the content of traditional media, such as television, ads, and women's magazines, reveal a systemic emphasis on idealized, limited esthetic standards that put physical appearance ahead of practical ability. People are socialized to see their own bodies from a third-person, detached perspective as a result of this widespread exposure.

The delivery and internalization of these objectifying gazes have changed due to the growth of interactive digital media platforms like Instagram and TikTok. Social networking sites encourage active self-curation, image editing, and peer comparison, in contrast to the passive consumption of traditional broadcast media. External utility is a crucial aspect of self-worth, and quantitative metrics such as "likes," comments, and view counts serve as explicit validation mechanisms. Thus, regular use of appearance-focused social media is associated with higher levels of systemic appearance anxiety, body dissatisfaction, and chronic body surveillance in a variety of age groups.

=== Peer and interpersonal reinforcement ===
In addition to media exposure, peer group interactions and direct interpersonal communication reinforce self-objectification. According to sociological and psychological research, appearance-related discussions, like "fat talk" or body-centric taunting, support the societal belief that a person's physical appearance is their most defining characteristic. In situations where external gaze evaluation is decentralized, these peer dynamics create rigorous norm enforcement, transferring accountability from media apparatuses to local social networks. Self-objectification tendencies are solidified long before adulthood due to this constant cycle of surveillance.

== See also ==
- Sexual objectification
- Objectification of people
