= Hussel =

German confectionary retailer

Hussel GmbH
- Company type: Gesellschaft mit beschränkter Haftung
- Industry: Retailing
- Founded: 1949
- Founder: Rudolf Hussel
- Headquarters: Wahlstedt, Germany
- Number of locations: 137 stores (2022)
- Key people: Patrick G. Weber (chairman)
- Services: Confectionery retail stores
- Number of employees: est. 1,300
- Website: http://www.hussel.de/

Hussel GmbH is a German confectionery retailer founded in 1949. Hussel operates around 137 retail shops in Germany and Austria. In addition, Hussel sells its products online. Approximately 1,300 employees work for Hussel. Hussel's headquarters is in Wahlstedt in Schleswig-Holstein and its chairman is Patrick G. Weber.

== History ==
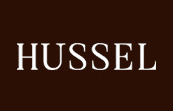
Hussel former logo

Named after the founder Rudolf Hussel, the company was founded in 1949 in Hagen. In 1951, Hussel operated 10 fully owned retail shops. By 1957, the number of retail shops grew to about 100 and the company changed its focus from mass produced ware to high quality premium confectionery. In 1962, the firm reincorporated as a publicly traded stock company ("AG"). Under the leadership of then CEO Herbert Eklöh Hussel AG expanded and diversified into other, non-food retail sectors, especially into perfume retailing. In 1969, Hussel acquired 6 retail shops of the perfume retailer Douglas (cosmetics) in Hamburg. Part and parcel of this development was the restructuring of Hussel AG in 1972 into a holding structure with two operating companies: one for confectionery and one for perfume. Due to additional acquisitions and the increasing importance of perfume retailing within the Hussel Holding AG, further corporate restructuring followed, leading to the inception of the Douglas Holding AG that replaced the Hussel Holding AG.

== Ownership ==
In March 2014, Douglas Holding sold Hussel to private equity fund Emeram Capital Partners. In September 2018, Emeram Capital Partners sold Hussel to the Arko Group, forming Europe’s largest confectionary. Later, the Arko Group reincorporated under the name Deutsche Confiserie Holding GmbH, with Arko, Hussel and Eilles as its operational subsidiaries. In 2021, due to the COVID-19 pandemic, its brands Arko, Hussel, and Eilles filed for bankruptcy. Nine months after the bankruptcy was filed, the reorganization of confectionery retailers Arko, Eilles, and Hussel was successful and the Hussel brand continued operating its retail stores and online store.

== See also ==
- Douglas (cosmetics)
