= Mimi Nichter =

American anthropologist

Mimi Nichter is an American anthropologist, professor emerita at the School of Anthropology, University of Arizona.

She earned her Ph.D. from the University of Arizona in 1995.

Her book, Fat Talk: What Girls and their Parents Say about Dieting, is about the links between culture, body image, and dieting.

She is the recipient of the 2001 Margaret Mead Award. The nominating letter says, "The “fat talk” of the title is a routine through which girls ritually lament their own bodily flaws. Yet, rather than represent this widespread practice as pathological or indicative of girls’ low self-esteem, Nichter argues that “fat talk” is a rich and complex resource for expressing solidarity, with intricate functions in adolescent interaction."

Another notable focus of her work is women's use of tobacco.

== Books ==
- 2015: Lighting Up: The Rise of Social Smoking among College Students
- Nichter, Mimi (2000). Fat Talk: What Girls and Their Parents Say About Dieting. Harvard University Press. ISBN 9780674002296.
- 2002: (with Nicole Taylor) A Filtered Life: Social Media on a College Campus
- 1996: (with Mark Nichter) Anthropology and International Health: Asian Case Studies
