= Douglas (company) =

German multinational perfume and cosmetics retailer

Douglas AG
- Trade name: Douglas Group
- Type: Public
- Traded as: FWB: DOU; SDAX
- Industry: Retailing
- Founded: 1910; 116 years ago
- Founder: John Sharp Douglas
- Headquarters: Düsseldorf, Germany
- Number of locations: 1,845 (2023)
- Area served: Europe
- Key people: Sander van der Laan (CEO); Henning Kreke (Chairman)
- Products: Perfumes and cosmetics
- Revenue: €3.65 billion (2022)
- Operating income: −€79.6 million (2022)
- Net income: −€306 million (2022)
- Total assets: €4.3 billion (2022)
- Number of employees: 18,274 (2022)
- Subsidiaries: Douglas; Nocibé; Parfumdreams; Niche Beauty
- Website: douglas.de; douglas.group

Logo used until 2018

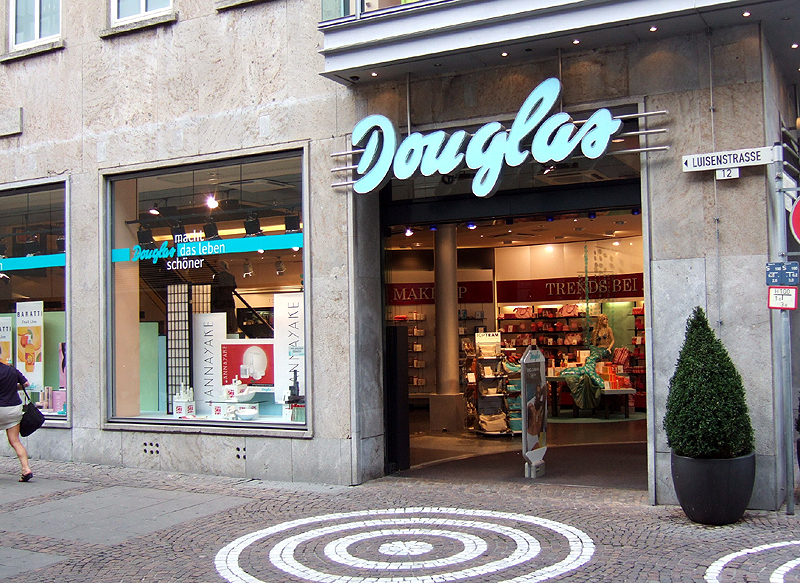
Douglas in Darmstadt, Germany

Douglas AG, doing business as Douglas Group, is a German multinational company specializing in perfumery and cosmetics. Its headquarters are located in Düsseldorf, Germany. The first perfumery to carry the name "Parfümerie Douglas" opened in Hamburg in 1910. Douglas GmbH was part of the Douglas Holding, but as of 1 June 2015, 85 percent belongs to the financial investor CVC Capital Partners, and 15 percent to the Kreke family.

== History ==
The name of the company can be traced back to the Scottish soap manufacturer John Sharp Douglas. He came from a small village near Glasgow and on 5 January 1821, he founded a soap factory in Hamburg's warehouse district. The factory was soon included in the "Hamburger Address Book" as "J.S. Douglas, Engl. Soap factory, Kehrwieder, Herbst Hof". On 5 November 1828, Hamburg granted John Sharp Douglas citizenship as number 663 of the Civil Protocol. Two years later, on 23 July 1830, Douglas married the mother of his six children, Johanna Catharina Francisca Becker.

Douglas's soap products, such as the Coconut Oil Soda Soap, developed in 1830 and the Chinese Heavenly Soap, introduced around 1840 quickly turned into success. Thanks to modern manufacturing processes, Douglas benefited from greater production efficiency. Soap became a much more affordable product to a wider range of the public and bathing became a normal thing to do.

Douglas died in 1847 and his sons Thomas and Alexander took over the business under the name "J.S. Douglas Sons". In 1851, they presented their soap products at the first World Fair in London, where the "Chinese Heavenly Soap" was honored with a medal. In the same year, the brothers developed their "Egyptian Toilette Soap".

In September 1878, Thomas and Alexander Douglas separated as business partners and sold the company to merchants Gustav Adolph Heinrich Runge and Johan Adolph Kolbe. The new owners kept the company's name "J.S. Douglas Sons" and expanded the assortment to leather goods, travel utensils and fashion items, which they called "Fantasy Products". In 1888, Gustav Adolph Kolbe took over the position of his deceased father, Johann Adolph, and two years later became the sole owner of the company. By proxy in 1909, he handed responsibility of the soap factory to his wife Berta.

=== The first Douglas Perfumeries ===
Berta Kolbe was the first woman to take over the management of J.S Douglas Sons. She received a business offer from Anna and Maria Carstens: the sisters wanted to open their own perfumery under the established name of "Douglas" to "establish and operate a business in soaps, perfumery products and toiletries in Hamburg." And so, on 24 May 1910, the first "Parfümerie Douglas" opened on Hamburg's shopping street Neuer Wall, and even exists today.

In 1929, the Carsten sisters passed the business on to their goddaughters Hertha and Lucie and their father, German artist Johannes Harders. As of 1931, the company was called "Parfümerie Douglas Harders & Co." and thus, reflected the new ownership structure. In 1936, the family hired Erhard Hunger to run the business. He reduced the soap business and expanded the assortment to premium brand products like Elizabeth Arden. By 1969, Erhard Hunger had expanded Douglas to six stores in Hamburg.

=== From perfumery to corporation ===
In 1969, the six Douglas perfumeries were taken over by the then listed Hussel AG. Under the management of Hussel's chief executive at the time, John Kreke, Hussel AG fueled the expansion of the perfumery through more takeovers and store openings. These were initially consolidated under the name Hanhausen-Douglas GmbH. In the course of this development, Hussel AG was restructured into a holding group with two operating companies: one for confectionery and one for perfumeries. In 1973, Hanhausen-Douglas took over the Austrian chain Ruttner. As of 1976, all perfumery stores eventually operated under the name "Parfümerie Douglas" and the associated company under the name "Parfümerie Douglas GmbH".

=== Growth in Europe ===
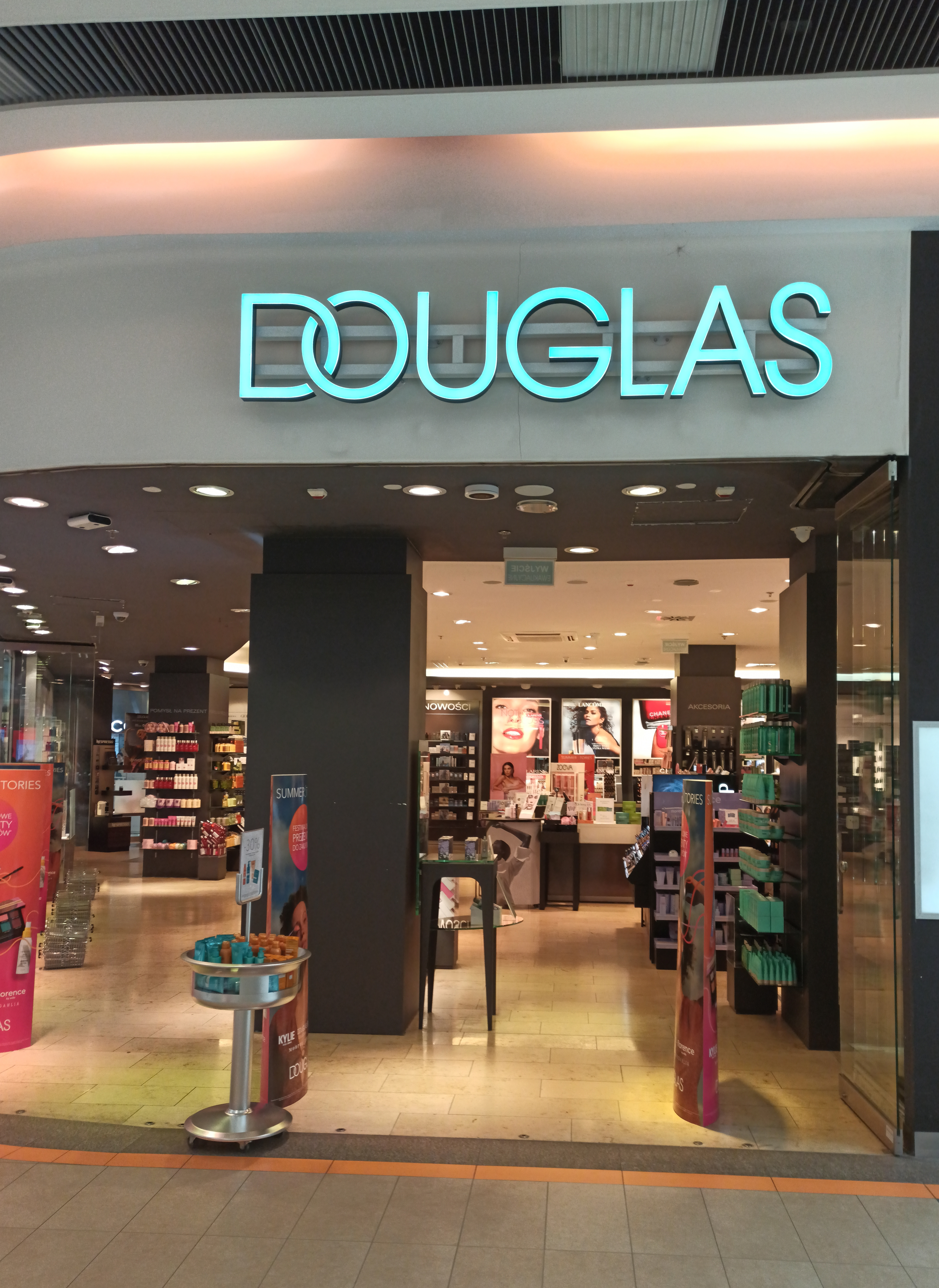
Douglas in Wałbrzych, Poland

In the 1980s, Parfümerie Douglas GmbH expanded into the Netherlands, France, Italy, and the United States. The company also grew in Germany through acquisitions such as "Er & Sie" perfumeries. This expansion led to an organizational restructuring, completed in 1989 with the founding of Douglas Holding AG, which replaced Hussel Holding AG.

After the fall of the Berlin Wall, Douglas opened stores in eastern Germany in the 90s and expanded into Switzerland, Spain and Portugal. Since the start of the new millennium, Douglas has expanded to Poland, Hungary, Monaco, Slovakia, the Czech Republic, Latvia, Lithuania, Estonia, Romania, Bulgaria, Turkey, Denmark, Croatia and Slovenia. In addition to stationary retail, Douglas has also been selling its products via its own online shop since 2000.

At the annual general meeting in June 2001, Jörn Kreke handed over the chairmanship of the Douglas Holding to his son Henning Kreke after 32 years in the top position.

Due in part to the economic crisis and a low market share, the company withdrew from Slovakia, Estonia and Denmark in 2009/10 as well as from the American market.

As of 2025, Douglas has opened stores again in Slovakia.

=== Takeover by financial investor ===
In 2012, the Kreke family, together with the private equity investor Advent International, made a public takeover offer to the remaining shareholders of the listed parent company of the Douglas Group, Douglas Holding AG, which at that time also included the companies Thalia (books), Christ (jewelry), AppelrathCüpper (womensear) and Hussel (confectionary). After the successful takeover in 2013, Douglas de-listed from the Frankfurt stock exchange. This marked the beginning of the conglomerate's reorientation, which went back to being purely a perfumery chain in 2014.

France is the only country where the Douglas store brand is not used, with Nocibé being used instead

After that, Douglas continued to grow internationally and acquired the French perfumery chain Nocibé with 455 stores in 2014. The 170 French Douglas branches that existed at the time were rebranded as Nocibé. In addition, the company expanded to Norway.

=== Change of ownership and strategic realignment ===
At first, a renewed stock market launch for the Parfümerie Douglas Deutschland was planned for 2015. However, on 1 June 2015, 85 percent of the company was sold to financial investor CVC Capital Partners with the Kreke family still holding a minority share of 15 percent.

Then, manager Isabelle Parize took over as CEO of Douglas in February 2016 and the headquarters was moved in October from Hagen to Düsseldorf. According to Douglas, the company wanted all customer-oriented departments and the online activities from Cologne to be concentrated in one place. In the same year, the company withdrew from Turkey due to a small market share.

In July 2017, Douglas completed a transaction to acquire the Spanish perfumery chain Bodybell. In November, the company also completed transactions to acquire the Spanish chain Perfumerías If and the Italian perfumery chains Limoni and La Gardenia.

=== Restructuring and online growth ===
In November 2017, Tina Müller took over as the Group CEO of Douglas.

In 2018, Douglas bought the majority of Parfümerie Akzente and its online shop Parfumdreams which operates in Belgium, Denmark, Finland, Ireland, Sweden and the United Kingdom.

In January 2021, the company management decided to close around 500 of the 2,400 Douglas shops in Europe and instead to expand its own global online stores, which grew by 40.6% in 2020 to €822 million in sales. In the 2020 financial year, which was marked by the COVID-19 pandemic and ended in September of the same year, Douglas recorded a decline in sales of 6.4% with worldwide sales of €3.2 billion. The operating result for the 2020 financial year fell by more than 16.7% to €292 million compared to the previous year.

In Spain, 103 of the 380 shops were closed and around 600 employees laid off. In Germany, 60 of 430 stores were closed and up to 600 employees laid off. In France, 41 of 610 Nocibé stores were sold to Bogart. Major closings were also made in Italy and Portugal.

Sander van der Laan has been the new group CEO of Douglas since November 2022. Tina Müller moved to the supervisory board. Since January 2023, Philipp Andrée has been Chief Digital Officer (CDO) and a member of the management board of the Douglas Group.

Douglas opened its first stores in Belgium and Slovenia in 2023, after having launched online stores in both countries in 2021.

== Products and brands ==
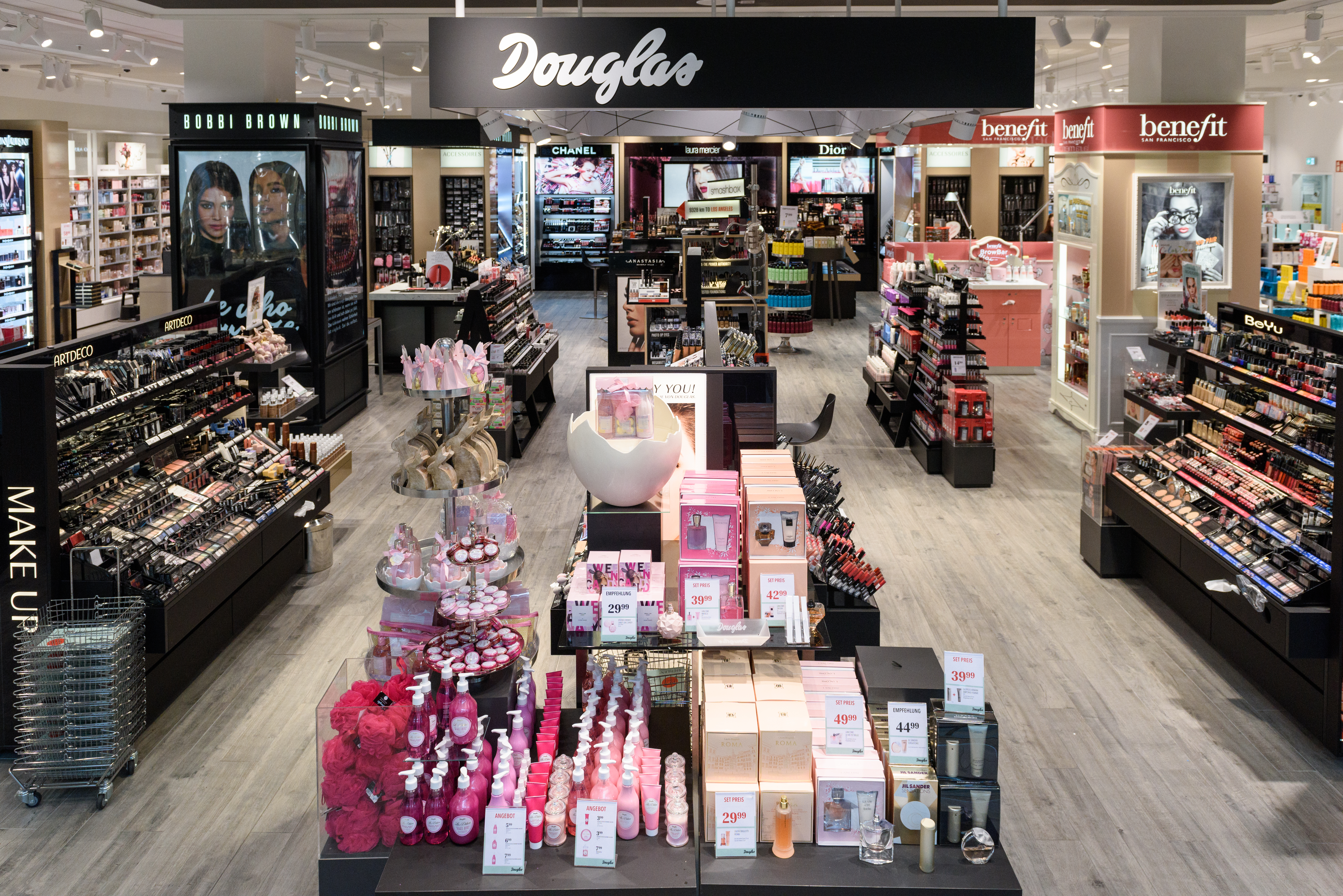
Inside of a Douglas store

Douglas features a diverse array of fragrances, cosmetics, skin and hair products, nutritional supplements, and accessories from more than 750 private label and premium brands.

Fragrances represents the main category which accounts for over 50% of sales with brands as Armani, Chanel, Dior, Guerlain, Givenchy, Lancôme, Michael Kors and Yves Saint Laurent.

Skin & body care products, including creams, serums, masks, tonics, firming and slimming products, and other products such as cleansers or sun protection, account for approximately 25% of sales and include brands like La Prairie, La Mer, Sensai, Augustinus Bader, Dr. Barbara Sturm, Sisley, MBR, Chanel, Dior and own brands like Dr. Susanne von Schmiedeberg and One.two.free!

Color cosmetics include products for lips, nails and make-up, which account for around 20% of sales with premium brands including MAC Cosmetics, Benefit, Artdeco and Lancôme, as well as exclusive brands like It Cosmetics and Neonaill and also its own brands like Douglas Make-up and Nocibé Artiste.

Hair cosmetics such as shampoos, conditioners, treatments, hair tonics, styling products and tools make around 2% of sales.

Food supplements were introduced in 2019 with the launch of the company's own brand, #INNERBEAUTY.

In 2019, Douglas launched the first European online marketplace for beauty products in Germany, making its online offering the largest product portfolio in Europe. In 2022, the marketplace was present in Austria, France, Germany, Italy, Poland and the Netherlands with 157 partners which offers around 300,000 stock keeping units (SKUs).
