= Slaycation season 2 =

Canadian reality television series

Slaycation
- Series 2
- No. of contestants: 6
- Winner: Xana
- Runner-up: Tessa Testicle

Release
- Original network: Crave; WOW Presents Plus (International)
- Original release: 12 December – 26 December 2025

Season chronology
- ← Previous; Season 1

The second season of Slaycation, a Canadian reality television series, premiered in December 12, 2025 on the television network Crave. The series is a non-competitive spin-off of Canada's Drag Race within the Drag Race franchise. The season followed the personal and professional lives of six Drag Race alumni as they vacation in a winter retreat in Canada, and compete for the title of 'Queen of Slaycation'.

The cast was revealed on March 6, 2025. It features queens previously from Canada's Drag Race and Canada's Drag Race: Canada vs. the World, along with the American RuPaul's Drag Race, RuPaul's Drag Race All Stars, and RuPaul's Drag Race Global All Stars, the German Drag Race Germany, and the French Drag Race France and Drag Race France All Stars.

Slaycation season 2 was slated to premiere on Crave in Canada and on WOW Presents Plus in the rest of the world, later in 2025.

== Contestants ==
Ages, names, and cities stated are at time of filming.

Contestants of Slaycation Season 2 and their backgrounds
Contestant	Age	Hometown	Original season(s)	Original placement(s)	Outcome
Xana	27	Vancouver, Canada	Canada Season 5	6th place	Winner
Tessa Testicle	27	Basel, Switzerland	Germany Season 1	8th place	Runner-up
Tessa Testicle	27	Basel, Switzerland	Global All Stars	5th place	Runner-up
Alyssa Edwards	45	Dallas, United States	US Season 5	6th place	3rd place
Alyssa Edwards	45	Dallas, United States	All Stars 2	5th place	3rd place
Alyssa Edwards	45	Dallas, United States	Global All Stars	Winner	3rd place
Miss Fiercalicious	28	Toronto, Canada	Canada Season 3	3rd place	3rd place
Miss Fiercalicious	28	Toronto, Canada	Canada vs. the World Season 2	5th place	3rd place
Nicky Doll	34	Marseille, France	US Season 12	11th place	3rd place
Nicky Doll	34	Marseille, France	France & France All Stars	—N/a (Note: Nicky Doll hosts Drag Race France and Drag Race France All Stars.)	3rd place
Silky Nutmeg Ganache	34	Houston, United States	US Season 11	3rd place	3rd place
Silky Nutmeg Ganache	34	Houston, United States	All Stars 6	11th place	3rd place
Silky Nutmeg Ganache	34	Houston, United States	Canada vs. the World Season 1	Runner-up	3rd place

== Contestant progress ==
Legend:

The contestant won Slaycation season 2.
The contestant was runner-up.
WIN indicates that the contestant won the challenge.
TOP2 indicates that the contestant was one of the two best performing in the challenge.
SAFE indicates that the contestant was safe.
ELIM (Eliminated) indicates that the contestant was eliminated.

Contestants progress with placements in each episode
Contestant	Episode							
Contestant	1	2	3	4		5	6	
Xana	SAFE	WIN	SAFE	SAFE	WIN	WIN	SAFE	Winner
Tessa Testicle	WIN	SAFE	WIN	SAFE	WIN	SAFE	SAFE	Runner-up
Alyssa Edwards	SAFE	SAFE	SAFE	SAFE	SAFE	SAFE	TOP2	Eliminated
Miss Fiercalicious	SAFE	SAFE	SAFE	SAFE	WIN	SAFE	WIN	Eliminated
Nicky Doll	SAFE	SAFE	SAFE	SAFE	SAFE	WIN	SAFE	Eliminated
Silky Nutmeg Ganache	SAFE	SAFE	SAFE	WIN	SAFE	WIN	SAFE	Eliminated

== Episodes ==
No. overall	No. in season	Title	Original release date
7	1	"Day 1: Nicky"	December 12, 2025
8	2	"Day 2: Xana"	December 12, 2025
9	3	"Day 3: Silky"	December 19, 2025
10	4	"Day 4: Fierce"	December 19, 2025
11	5	"Day 5: Alyssa"	December 26, 2025
12	6	"Day 6: Tessa"	December 26, 2025
The Biker Queen: Tessa Testicle; Shooter Queen: Xana; Dough Queen: Tessa Testicle; Mixology Queen 2.0: Silky Nutmeg Ganache; Hockey Queens: Miss Fiercalicious, Tessa Testicle and Xana; Curl Queen: Nicky Doll (MVP), Silky Nutmeg Ganache & Xana; The Mushing Queen: Miss Fiercalicious; Queen of Slaycation: Xana
