= Drag Race Brasil season 2 =

2025 season of Drag Race Brasil

Drag Race Brasil
- Season 2
- Promotional poster for season two
- Hosted by: Grag Queen
- Judges: Grag Queen; Bruna Braga; Dudu Bertholini
- No. of contestants: 10
- Winner: Ruby Nox
- Runner-up: Mellody Queen
- No. of episodes: 10

Release
- Original network: WOW Presents Plus
- Original release: 10 July – 11 September 2025

Season chronology
- ← Previous; Season 1

The second season of Drag Race Brasil premiered on July 10, 2025.

== Production ==
The second season of Drag Race Brasil was confirmed to be in production on February 5, 2024 by Fenton Bailey and Randy Barbato, co-founders of World of Wonder and executive producers of the Drag Race franchise. The second season of Drag Race México was greenlit simultaneously. The first season having aired on Paramount+, it was also confirmed that the second season would be available exclusively on WOW Presents Plus, World of Wonder's own streaming platform.

Filming for the season reportedly commenced on January 29, 2025 and lasted for three weeks. Unlike the first season, which was filmed in Colombia, the filming location for the second season was Portugal. In January the show's host, Grag Queen, began posting teasers of the set on social media, thus confirming her involvement with the season.

The season's cast was announced on June 3, 2025 alongside confirmation that regular judges Bruna Braga and Dudu Bertholini would be returning from the first season to join Grag Queen on the panel.

== Contestants ==
Drag Race Brasil contestants and their backgrounds (Note: All names and cities are stated at time of filming.)
Contestant	Age	City	Outcome
Ruby Nox	31	Carnaíba, Pernambuco	Winner
Mellody Queen	30	Belo Horizonte, Minas Gerais	Runner-up
Melina Blley	30	Sapé, Paraíba	3rd place
Poseidon Drag	28	Recife, Pernambuco	3rd place
Bhelchi	37	São Paulo, São Paulo	5th place
Adora Black	25	Cidade Ocidental, Goiás	6th place
DesiRée Beck	34	Irecê, Bahia	7th place
Mercedez Vulcão	37	Vinhedo, São Paulo	8th place
Paola Hoffmann Van Cartier	36	Vila Velha, Espírito Santo	9th place
Chanel	22	Niterói, Rio de Janeiro	10th place

== Contestant progress ==
Legend:

Ruby Nox won Drag Race Brasil season 2.
Mellody Queen was the runner-up.
WIN indicates that the contestant won the challenge.
TOP2 indicates that the contestant was one of the two best performing in the challenge, but lost the lip sync to win it.
STAY indicates that the contestant won a LaLaPaRuZa lip sync and remained in the competition.
SAFE indicates that the contestant was declared safe by the judges.
SAVE indicates that Bhelchi was saved from participating in the final lip sync of the LaLaPaRuZa.
BTM (Bottom) indicates that the contestant was up for elimination.
ELIM (Eliminated) indicates that the contestant was eliminated.
Guest indicates that the contestant returned as a guest.

Contestants progress with placements in each episode
Contestant	Episode									
Contestant	1	2	3	4	5	6	7	8	9	10
Ruby Nox	WIN	SAFE	SAFE	SAFE	SAFE	SAFE	BTM	WIN	WIN	Winner
Mellody Queen	SAFE	SAFE	WIN	BTM	SAFE	BTM	STAY	SAFE	BTM	Runner-up
Melina Blley	TOP2	SAFE	BTM	SAFE	SAFE	SAFE	STAY	BTM	SAFE	Eliminated
Poseidon Drag	SAFE	BTM	WIN	SAFE	SAFE	SAFE	STAY	BTM	SAFE	Eliminated
Bhelchi	SAFE	SAFE	SAFE	WIN	SAFE	SAFE	SAVE	SAFE	ELIM	
Adora Black	SAFE	WIN	SAFE	SAFE	BTM	WIN	ELIM			
DesiRée Beck	SAFE	SAFE	SAFE	BTM	WIN	ELIM				
Mercedez Vulcão	SAFE	SAFE	SAFE	SAFE	ELIM					
Paola Hoffmann Van Cartier	SAFE	SAFE	ELIM							
Chanel	SAFE	ELIM								

== Lip syncs ==
Legend:

The contestant won the lip sync to win the challenge.
The contestant was eliminated after their first time in the bottom.
The contestant was eliminated after their second time in the bottom.
The contestant won the first round of the Lip Sync LaLaPaRuZa Smackdown and remained in the competition.
The contestant won the Lip Sync for the Crown and was declared the winner of the season.

Episode	Top contestants			Song	Winner
1	Melina Blley	vs.	Ruby Nox	"Funk Rave" (Anitta)	Ruby Nox
Episode	Bottom contestants			Song	Eliminated
2	Chanel	vs.	Poseidon Drag	"Ultra Som" (Pabllo Vittar)	Chanel
3	Melina Blley	vs.	Paola Hoffmann Van Cartier	"The Beginning" (RuPaul)	Paola Hoffmann Van Cartier
4	DesiRée Beck	vs.	Mellody Queen	"Brasil" (Gal Costa)	None
5	Adora Black	vs.	Mercedez Vulcão	"Tombei" (Karol Conká ft. Tropkillaz)	Mercedez Vulcão
6	DesiRée Beck	vs.	Mellody Queen	"A Dona Aranha" (Luísa Sonza)	DesiRée Beck
Episode	Contestants			Song	Winner
7	Bhelchi	vs.	Melina Blley	"U Wear It Well" (RuPaul)	Melina Blley
7	Adora Black	vs.	Poseidon Drag	"I'm a Winner, Baby" (RuPaul)	Poseidon Drag
7	Mellody Queen	vs.	Ruby Nox	"A Little Bit of Love" (RuPaul)	Mellody Queen
7	Bottom contestants			Song	Eliminated
7	Adora Black	vs.	Ruby Nox	"Sissy That Walk" (RuPaul)	Adora Black
8	Melina Blley	vs.	Poseidon Drag	"Bixinho (Lux & Tróia Remix)" (Duda Beat)	None
9	Bhelchi	vs.	Mellody Queen	"Jeito Sexy" (Fat Family)	Bhelchi
Episode	Final contestants			Song	Winner
10	Mellody Queen	vs.	Ruby Nox	"O Amor e o Poder" (Rosana Fiengo)	Ruby Nox

== Guest judges ==
Listed in chronological order:

- Blogueirinha, drag queen and digital influencer
- Fontana, runner-up on Drag Race Sverige Season 1
- Bielo Pereira, internet personality and activist
- Kelly Heelton, contestant on Drag Race Germany Season 1
- Victoria Shakespears, contestant on Drag Race Germany Season 1
- Cláudia Raia, actress
- Keiona, winner of Drag Race France Season 2
- Melissa Bianchini, runner-up on Drag Race Italia Season 3

=== Special guests ===
Guests who appeared in episodes, but did not judge on the main stage.

Episode 1

- Valdemir Ribas, choreographer

Episode 9

- Norvina, president of Anastasia Beverly Hills

== Episodes ==
No. overall	No. in season	Title	Original release date
13	1	"The Birds of Paradise Take Flight"	10 July 2025
Guest Judge: Blogueirinha; Mini-Challenge: Drag Race franchise quiz; Mini-Challenge Winner: Mellody Queen; Main Challenge: Perform choreography to Grag Queen's song "Boogie Brasil"; Runway Theme: Tempero Brasileiro (Brazilian Spice); Top Two: Melina Blley and Ruby Nox; Lip-Sync Song: "Funk Rave" by Anitta; Challenge Winner: Ruby Nox
14	2	"Paper Cuts"	17 July 2025
Guest Judge: Fontana; Mini-Challenge: Create a hair-whipping performance; Mini-Challenge Winner: Mellody Queen; Main Challenge: Create an outfit using paper; Runway Theme: Rainhas de Papel (Paper Queens); Challenge Winner: Adora Black; Bottom Two: Chanel and Poseidon Drag; Lip-Sync Song: "Ultra Som" by Pabllo Vittar; Eliminated: Chanel; Farewell Message: "Obrigada, turma de 2025 pelos momentos incríveis. Vidas repetentes importam kk Bjos CHANEL ♡" (Thank you, Class of 2025, for the unforgettable moments. Repeat lives matter lol Kisses, CHANEL ♡)
15	3	"Brazilian Girl Group Battle Royale"	24 July 2025
Guest Judge: Bielo Pereira; Mini-Challenge: Reading is Fundamental; Mini-Challenge Winner: Mellody Queen; Main Challenge: Write, record, and perform verses to "Batom" (Lipstick) and "Shot"; Runway Theme: A Noite das Vozes Icônicas (The Night of Iconic Voices); Challenge Winners: Mellody Queen and Poseidon Drag; Bottom Two: Melina Blley and Paola Hoffmann Van Cartier; Lip-Sync Song: "The Beginning" by RuPaul; Eliminated: Paola Hoffmann Van Cartier; Farewell Message: "Non ero pronta a andare ma vi amo tutte! Desiree e Mellody e Adora ganhem essa porra! Andate a Fanculo bicthes! Uma Van Cartier é sempre uma winner! 💋 ♡ Melina, limpa essa porra" (I wasn’t ready to leave but I love you all! Desiree, Mellody, and Adora — go win this shit! Fuck you bitches! A Van Cartier is always a winner! 💋 ♡ Melina, clean this shit up)
16	4	"News Just In..."	31 July 2025
Guest Judge: Bielo Pereira; Mini-Challenge: Create a Grindr profile picture; Mini-Challenge Winner: Melina Blley; Mini-Challenge Prize: A R$5,000 cash tip courtesy of Grindr; Main Challenge: In teams, interview guests for "Grag News"; Runway Theme: Lendas Brasileiras (Brazilian Legends); Challenge Winner: Bhelchi; Bottom Two: DesiRée Beck and Mellody Queen; Lip-Sync Song: "Brasil" by Gal Costa; Eliminated: None
17	5	"Snatched...For the Gods"	7 August 2025
Guest Judge: Kelly Heelton; Main Challenge: Snatch Game; Runway Theme: Bichanas de Pelúcia (Plushie Pussies); Challenge Winner: DesiRée Beck; Bottom Two: Adora Black and Mercedez Vulcão; Lip-Sync Song: "Tombei" by Karol Conká ft. Tropkillaz; Eliminated: Mercedez Vulcão; Farewell Message: "Foi uma honra dividir essa temporada com todas vocês. Nos vemos nos palcos da vida! Amo vocês (quebrem TUDO!) Beijos, Memê :*" (It was an honor to share this season with all of you. See you on life’s stages! I love you all (go SLAY!) Kisses, Memê :*)
18	6	"Three Courses, One Crown"	14 August 2025
Guest Judge: Victoria Shakespears; Main Challenge: The Brazilian Cuisine Ball; Runway Themes: Drags à la Carte, Candy Queens and Flying Horse Realness; Challenge Winner: Adora Black; Challenge Prize: A R$10,000 cash tip courtesy of Flying Horse; Bottom Two: DesiRée Beck and Mellody Queen; Lip-Sync Song: "A Dona Aranha" by Luísa Sonza; Eliminated: DesiRée Beck; Farewell Message:
19	7	"Lalaparuza Brasil - Rinha de Picumãs"	21 August 2025
Guest Judge: Cláudia Raia; Mini-Challenge: Tie a sausage to a rope around your waist and attempt to bite it; Mini-Challenge Winner: Adora Black; Main Challenge: Participate in a Lip-Sync LaLaPaRuZa Smackdown; Lip-Sync Songs: "U Wear It Well" by RuPaul, "I'm a Winner, Baby" by RuPaul and "A Little Bit of Love" by RuPaul; Lip-Sync Winners: Melina Blley, Poseidon Drag and Mellody Queen; Bottom Two: Adora Black and Ruby Nox; Lip-Sync Song: "Sissy That Walk" by RuPaul; Eliminated: Adora Black; Farewell Message:
20	8	"Read Bruna to Filth!"	28 August 2025
Guest Judge: Keiona; Main Challenge: Perform a roast of Bruna Braga; Runway Theme: Coração de Vidro (Glass Heart); Challenge Winner: Ruby Nox; Bottom Two: Melina Blley and Poseidon Drag; Lip-Sync Song: "Bixinho (Lux & Tróia Remix)" by Duda Beat; Eliminated: None
21	9	"Pin-Up Pairs"	4 September 2025
22	10	"Crowning Glory"	11 September 2025
