= International Queen of Mystery Ball =

- RuPaul's Drag Race Global All Stars episode
- Episode no.: Season 1 Episode 3
- Directed by: Nick Murray
- Presented by: RuPaul
- Original air date: August 23, 2024
- Running time: 44 minutes

Guest appearance
- Matt Rogers

Episode chronology
← Previous "Global Talent Extravaganza: Part 2"	Next → "Everybody Say Love Girl Groups"

"International Queen of Mystery Ball" is the third episode of the first season of the reality television series RuPaul's Drag Race Global All Stars, which first aired on August 23, 2024, through American streaming service network Paramount+. The episode has the contestants present three looks in a ball. Matt Rogers serves as a guest judge, alongside regular panelists RuPaul, Michelle Visage, and Jamal Sims.

Pythia wins the main challenge. Athena Likis is eliminated from the competition after placing in the bottom two and losing a lip-sync contest against Soa de Muse to "Bad Idea Right?" (2023) by Olivia Rodrigo.

== Episode ==
RuPaul greets the contestants in the Werk Room and reveals the main challenge: to present three outfits in a ball. The categories are Boss Lady in Charge, She-Vil Villain, and International Queen of Mystery. The latter category requires contestants to create an original "seductive spy" look.

While the contestants create their original designs, RuPaul visits the Werk Room for status updates. On the main stage, RuPaul welcomes fellow judges Michelle Visage and Jamal Sims, as well as guest judge Matt Rogers. The contestants present their looks for each category. The judges deliver their critiques to the top and bottom contestants, then excuse the contestants from the main stage during deliberations.

After the contestants return to the main stage, RuPaul announces Pythia as the winner and says Alyssa Edwards is safe. Tessa Testicle and Miranda Lebrão are deemed safe, leaving Athena Likis and Soa de Muse to face off in a lip-sync contest to "Bad Idea Right?" (2023) by Olivia Rodrigo. RuPaul declares Soa de Muse the winner and Athena Likis is eliminated from the competition.

== Fashion ==
For Boss Lady in Charge, Pythia wears an outfit resembling a suit. Eva Le Queen shows a purple dress and Kween Kong wears animal print. Athena Likis and Kitty Scott-Claus also wear suits. Miranda Lebrão wears a red outfit inspired by Carmen Sandiego. Nehellenia wears a dress and a large hat, and Alyssa Edwards carries a briefcase. Vanity Vain wears black and Soa de Muse wears white. Gala Varo's outfit is inspired by a doctor's coat, and Tessa Testicle wears a black jacket and an eyepatch.

For She-Vil Villain, Pythia and Eva Le Queen wear black outfits. Kween Kong's outfit is white and has foliage. Athena Likis wears an outfit inspired by the Creature from the Black Lagoon, and Kitty Scott-Claus has an outfit with sparklers. Miranda Lebrão's outfit has imagery of a face, and Nehellenia wears red spikes. Alyssa Edwards has a Black Swan-inspired outfit. Vanity Vain wears black spikes, and Soa de Muse has green hair. Gala Varos outfit resemble repitle skin, and Tessa Testicle tears away a red coat, showing a black dress.

For International Queen of Mystery, Pythia wears a red outfit with a matching briefcase. Eva Le Queen shows a pink dress and carries a brush. Kween Kong has a long ponytail and carries a magnifying glass. Athena Likis has a black outfit, and Kitty Scott-Claus has a pink outfit and carries a telephone on the runway. Miranda Lebrão has a face cover, and Nehellenia's outfit includes a cape. Alyssa Edwards wears a nude-colored outfit and a blonde wig. Vanity Vain says their look is inspired by Anna Nicole Smile. Soa de Muse wears a blue-green outfit and boots. Gala Varos has dark hair, and Tessa Testicle shows a Miss Congeniality-inspired pink dress.

== Reception ==
Alison Lee of The Miami Student said Vanity Vain's runway looks were among ways the season of Global All Stars "has displayed some of the most creative takes on runway themes that 'Drag Race' has shown in a while".
