= RuPaul's Drag Race Global All Stars =

American reality television series

- Hosted by: RuPaul
- Judges: RuPaul; Michelle Visage; Jamal Sims
- No. of contestants: 12
- Winner: Alyssa Edwards
- Runners-up: Kitty Scott-Claus; Kween Kong; Nehellenia
- Miss Global Peacemaker: Soa de Muse
- No. of episodes: 12

Release
- Original network: Paramount+
- Original release: August 16 – October 25, 2024

RuPaul's Drag Race Global All Stars is a television series, which premiered on August 16, 2024 and ended on October 25, 2024.

On July 15, 2024, the cast was announced, consisting of 12 contestants from various Drag Race adaptations and spin-offs from around the world that would compete for a cash prize of $200,000, and a spot in the "International Pavilion" at the "Drag Race Hall of Fame".

== Contestants ==
Ages, names, and cities stated are at time of filming.

Contestants of RuPaul's Drag Race Global All Stars and their backgrounds
Contestant	Age	Hometown	Original season(s)	Original placement(s)	Outcome
Alyssa Edwards	44	Dallas, United States	US Season 5	6th place	Winner
Alyssa Edwards	44	Dallas, United States	All Stars 2	5th place	Winner
Kitty Scott-Claus	32	Birmingham, United Kingdom	UK Series 3	Runner-up	Runners-up
Kween Kong	31	Adelaide, Australia	Down Under Season 2	Runner-up	Runners-up
Nehellenia	33	Rome, Italy	Italia Season 2	Runner-up (Note: Nehellenia was voted Miss Congeniality on her original season.)	Runners-up
Tessa Testicle	25	Basel, Switzerland	Germany Season 1	8th place	5th place
Vanity Vain	31	Linköping, Sweden	Sverige Season 1	3rd place	6th place
Pythia	30	Montreal, Canada	Canada Season 2	Runner-up	7th place
Gala Varo	34	Morelia, Mexico	México Season 1	Runner-up	8th place
Soa de Muse	34	Saint-Denis, France	France Season 1	Runner-up	9th place (Note: Soa de Muse was crowned Global Lip Sync Assassin.) (Note: Soa de Muse was voted Miss Global Peacemaker.)
Eva Le Queen	35	Marikina, Philippines	Philippines Season 1	3rd place	10th place
Miranda Lebrão	34	Rio de Janeiro, Brazil	Brasil Season 1	Runner-up	11th place
Athena Likis (Note: Now known as Athena Likis, she was referred to as Athena Sorgelikis on Drag Race Belgique season 1.)	27	City of Brussels, Belgium	Belgique Season 1	Runner-up	12th place

== Contestant progress ==
Legend:

Alyssa Edwards won RuPaul's Drag Race Global All Stars season 1.
Kitty Scott-Claus, Kween Kong and Nehellenia were the runners-up.
Soa de Muse was voted Miss Global Peacemaker (Miss GP).
Soa de Muse was crowned Global Lip Sync Assassin (GLSA) after winning the final Global LaLaPaRuza Smackdown lip sync.
WIN indicates that the contestant won the challenge.
TOP2 indicates that the contestant was one of the two best performing in the challenge, but lost the lip sync to win it.
SAFE indicates that the contestant was declared safe by the judges.
BTM (Bottom) indicates that the contestant was up for elimination.
ELIM (Eliminated) indicates that the contestant was eliminated.
LOSS indicates that the eliminated contestant participated in the Global LaLaPaRuza Smackdown, but lost one of the lip syncs.
Guest indicates that the contestant appeared in the episode but did not compete.

Contestants progress with placements in each episode
Contestant	Episode											
Contestant	1	2	3	4	5	6	7	8	9	10	11	12
Alyssa Edwards	WIN	Guest	SAFE	SAFE	SAFE	SAFE	SAFE	SAFE	SAFE	WIN	Guest	Winner
Kitty Scott-Claus	SAFE	Guest	SAFE	WIN	SAFE	SAFE	WIN	WIN	BTM	SAFE	Guest	Runner-up
Kween Kong	WIN	Guest	SAFE	SAFE	WIN	SAFE	SAFE	WIN	SAFE	BTM	Guest	Runner-up
Nehellenia	Guest	SAFE	SAFE	SAFE	SAFE	SAFE	SAFE	SAFE	WIN	SAFE	Guest	Runner-up
Tessa Testicle	Guest	SAFE	SAFE	SAFE	SAFE	WIN	SAFE	SAFE	SAFE	ELIM	LOSS	Guest
Vanity Vain	Guest	WIN	SAFE	BTM	SAFE	SAFE	BTM	BTM	ELIM		LOSS	Guest
Pythia	Guest	SAFE	WIN	SAFE	SAFE	SAFE	SAFE	ELIM	Guest		LOSS	Guest
Gala Varo	Guest	SAFE	SAFE	SAFE	BTM	BTM	ELIM		Guest		TOP2	Guest
Soa de Muse	SAFE	Guest	BTM	SAFE	SAFE	ELIM			Guest		GLSA	Miss GP
Eva Le Queen	Guest	TOP2	SAFE	SAFE	ELIM				Guest		LOSS	Guest
Miranda Lebrão	SAFE	Guest	SAFE	ELIM					Guest		LOSS	Guest
Athena Likis	SAFE	Guest	ELIM						Guest		LOSS	Guest

== Lip syncs ==
Legend:

The contestant won the lip sync to win the challenge.
The contestant was eliminated after their first time in the bottom.
The contestant was eliminated after their second time in the bottom.
The contestant was eliminated after their third time in the bottom.
The contestant was eliminated after their fourth time in the bottom.
The eliminated contestant won the first round of the Global Lip Sync LaLaPaRuZa and advanced to the next round.
The eliminated contestant won the second round of the Global Lip Sync LaLaPaRuZa and advanced to the final round.
The eliminated contestant won the final round of the Global Lip Sync LaLaPaRuZa and was declared Global Lip Sync Assassin.
The contestant won the Lip Sync for the Crown and was declared the winner of the season.

Episode	Top All Stars			Song	Winner(s)
1	Alyssa Edwards	vs.	Kween Kong	"Only Girl (In the World)" (Rihanna)	Alyssa Edwards
1	Alyssa Edwards	vs.	Kween Kong	"Only Girl (In the World)" (Rihanna)	Kween Kong
2	Eva Le Queen	vs.	Vanity Vain	"Paranoia" (Danna, Steve Aoki)	Vanity Vain
Episode	Contestants			Song	Eliminated
3	Athena Likis	vs.	Soa de Muse	"Bad Idea Right?" (Olivia Rodrigo)	Athena Likis
4	Miranda Lebrão	vs.	Vanity Vain	"Spice Up Your Life" (Spice Girls)	Miranda Lebrão
5	Eva Le Queen	vs.	Gala Varo	"Take On Me" (A-ha)	Eva Le Queen
6	Gala Varo	vs.	Soa de Muse	"Bang Bang" (Jessie J, Ariana Grande, Nicki Minaj)	Soa de Muse
7	Gala Varo	vs.	Vanity Vain	"Mah Nà Mah Nà" (The Muppets)	Gala Varo
8	Pythia	vs.	Vanity Vain	"I Drove All Night" (Celine Dion)	Pythia
9	Kitty Scott-Claus	vs.	Vanity Vain	"Believe" (Cher)	Vanity Vain
10	Kween Kong	vs.	Tessa Testicle	"Don't Leave Me This Way" (Thelma Houston)	Tessa Testicle
Episode	Eliminated Queens			Song	Winner
11
11	Eva Le Queen	vs.	Vanity Vain	"Just What They Want" (RuPaul)	Eva Le Queen
11	Soa de Muse	vs.	Tessa Testicle	"A.S.M.R. Lover" (RuPaul ft. Skeltal Ki)	Soa de Muse
11	Athena Likis	vs.	Pythia	"Jealous of My Boogie (Gomi and RasJek Edit)" (RuPaul)	Athena Likis
11	Gala Varo	vs.	Miranda Lebrão	"Cha Cha Bitch" (RuPaul ft. AB Soto)	Gala Varo
11	Eva Le Queen	vs.	Gala Varo	"Call Me Mother" (RuPaul)	Gala Varo
11	Athena Likis	vs.	Soa de Muse	"U Wear It Well" (RuPaul)	Soa de Muse
11	Gala Varo	vs.	Soa de Muse	"The Beginning" (RuPaul)	Soa de Muse
Episode	Finalists			Song	Winner
12	Alyssa Edwards vs. Kitty Scott-Claus vs. Kween Kong vs. Nehellenia			"Bad Romance" (Lady Gaga)	Alyssa Edwards

== Guest judges ==
On August 1, the celebrity guest judges for this season were revealed:

- Adriana Lima, Brazilian model
- Danna Paola, Mexican singer and actress
- Matt Rogers, American comedian, actor, writer, podcaster, television host, and recording artist
- Ross Mathews, American television host and personality and judge on RuPaul's Drag Race
- Carson Kressley, American television personality, actor, designer and judge on RuPaul's Drag Race
- Jasmine Tookes, American fashion model
- Javier Ambrossi, Spanish actor, stage, film and television director, writer and judge on Drag Race España
- Javier Calvo, Spanish actor, stage, film, and television director, writer and judge on Drag Race España
- Graham Norton, Irish comedian, actor, author, television host and judge on RuPaul's Drag Race UK
- Dianne Brill, American fashion designer, model, author, former club kid and judge on Drag Race Germany
- Ts Madison, American reality television personality, actress and judge on RuPaul's Drag Race
- Ariadna Gutiérrez-Arévalo, Colombian actress, model and beauty pageant titleholder who was crowned Miss Colombia 2014 and 1st Runner-up of Miss Universe 2015

=== Special guests ===
Guests who appeared in episodes, but did not judge on the main stage.

Episode 6

- Norvina, president of Anastasia Beverly Hills

Episode 9

- Raven, runner-up of both RuPaul's Drag Race season 2 and All Stars 1

== Episodes ==
No.	Title	Original release date
1	"Global Talent Extravaganza"	August 16, 2024
Twelve queens from across the Drag Race franchise enter the workroom. RuPaul informs the queens that there will be a split premiere. For the first main challenge, the first six queens perform a talent in the Global Glamazon Talent Extravaganza.: Athena Likis – Burlesque comedy routine; Alyssa Edwards – Original song lip-sync and comedy routine; Kitty Scott-Claus – Live singing; Kween Kong – Original song lip-sync; Miranda Lebrão – Trapeze routine; Soa de Muse – Live singing; On the runway, category is Garden of Eden. Athena Likis, Alyssa Edwards, Kitty Scott-Claus, Kween Kong, Miranda Lebrão and Soa de Muse receive positive critiques. It is announced that Alyssa Edwards and Kween Kong are the top two queens of the week, and will lip-sync for the win. They lip-sync to "Only Girl (In The World)" by Rihanna. After the lip sync, Alyssa Edwards and Kween Kong are both announced as the winners of the challenge. RuPaul then announces that no one is going home.: Guest Judge: Adriana Lima; Main Challenge: Perform a talent in the Global Glamazon Talent Extravaganza; Runway Theme: Garden of Eden; Top Two: Alyssa Edwards and Kween Kong; Lip-Sync Song: "Only Girl (In The World)" by Rihanna; Challenge Winners: Alyssa Edwards and Kween Kong; Challenge Prize: A $10,000 cash tip, split between the winners
2	"Global Talent Extravaganza: Part 2"	August 16, 2024
For this week's mini-challenge, the queens pose for a photoshoot for the cover of Quick Drag Magazine. Nehellenia wins the mini-challenge. For the main challenge, the remaining six queens perform a talent in the Global Glamazon Talent Extravaganza.: Eva Le Queen – Comedy routine; Gala Varo – Pole dancing routine; Nehellenia – Original song lip-sync; Pythia – Comedy routine; Tessa Testicle – Burlesque routine; Vanity Vain – Live singing; On the runway, category is Money Makes The World Go Round. Eva Le Queen, Gala Varo, Nehellenia, Pythia, Tessa Testicle and Vanity Vain receive positive critiques. It is announced that Eva Le Queen and Vanity Vain are the top two queens of the week, and will lip-sync for the win. They lip-sync to "Paranoia" by Danna and Steve Aoki. After the lip sync, Vanity Vain is announced as the winner of the challenge. RuPaul then announces that no one is going home.: Guest Judge: Danna; Mini-Challenge: Photoshoot for the cover of Quick Drag Magazine; Mini-Challenge Winner: Nehellenia; Mini-Challenge Prize: A $2,500 cash tip; Main Challenge: Perform a talent in the Global Glamazon Talent Extravaganza; Runway Theme: Money Makes The World Go Round; Top Two: Eva Le Queen and Vanity Vain; Lip-Sync Song: "Paranoia" by Danna and Steve Aoki; Challenge Winner: Vanity Vain; Challenge Prize: A $10,000 cash tip
3	"International Queen of Mystery Ball"	August 23, 2024
For this week's main challenge, the queens create three looks for The International Queen of Mystery Ball: Boss Lady in Charge, She-Vil Villain and International Queen of Mystery. On the runway, Alyssa Edwards, Pythia and Tessa Testicle receive positive critiques, with Pythia winning the challenge. Athena Likis, Miranda Lebrão and Soa de Muse receive negative critiques, with Miranda Lebrão being safe. Athena Likis and Soa de Muse lip-sync to "Bad Idea Right?" by Olivia Rodrigo. Soa de Muse wins the lip-sync and Athena Likis is the first queen to sashay away.: Guest Judge: Matt Rogers; Main Challenge: The International Queen of Mystery Ball; Runway Themes: Boss Lady in Charge, She-Vil Villain and International Queen of Mystery; Challenge Winner: Pythia; Challenge Prize: A $10,000 cash tip; Bottom Two: Athena Likis and Soa de Muse; Lip-Sync Song: "Bad Idea Right?" by Olivia Rodrigo; Eliminated: Athena Likis
4	"Everybody Say Love Girl Groups"	August 30, 2024
For this week's mini-challenge, the queens have to guess the total population of their country. Kween Kong, Miranda Lebrão and Vanity Vain win the mini-challenge. For the main challenge, the queens write, record, and perform verses to "Everybody Say Love".: Team Back Door Gals - Gala Varo, Kitty Scott-Claus, Nehellenia and Vanity Vain; Team D'Vybe - Kween Kong, Pythia and Soa de Muse; Team Fresh M.E.A.T - Alyssa Edwards, Eva Le Queen, Miranda Lebrão and Tessa Testicle; On the runway, category is Color My World. Kitty Scott-Claus, Kween Kong and Nehellenia receive positive critiques, with Kitty Scott-Claus winning the challenge. Miranda Lebrão, Pythia and Vanity Vain receive negative critiques, with Pythia being safe. Miranda Lebrão and Vanity Vain lip-sync to "Spice Up Your Life" by Spice Girls. Vanity Vain wins the lip-sync and Miranda Lebrão sashays away.: Guest Judge: Ross Matthews; Mini-Challenge: Guess the total population of your country; Mini-Challenge Winners: Kween Kong, Miranda Lebrão and Vanity Vain; Main Challenge: Write, record, and perform verses to "Everybody Say Love"; Runway Theme: Color My World; Challenge Winner: Kitty Scott-Claus; Challenge Prize: A $10,000 cash tip; Bottom Two: Miranda Lebrão and Vanity Vain; Lip-Sync Song: "Spice Up Your Life" by Spice Girls; Eliminated: Miranda Lebrão
5	"Boobie: The Shequels"	September 6, 2024
For this week's mini-challenge, the queens read each other to filth. Kitty Scott-Claus wins the mini-challenge. For the main challenge, the queens team up to star in sequels of "Boobie".: Team Frankenboobie (Parody of Frankenstein) - Eva Le Queen, Gala Varo, Tessa Testicle and Vanity Vain; Team Boobies of the Caribbean: The Search for Buried Booty (Parody of Pirates of the Caribbean) - Nehellenia, Pythia and Vanity Vain; Team Jurassic Boobie (Parody of Jurassic Park) - Alyssa Edwards, Kitty Scott-Claus and Kween Kong; On the runway, category is Browntown. Team Jurassic Boobie is the winning team, with Kween Kong winning the challenge. Team Frankenboobie and Team Boobies of the Caribbean: The Search for Buried Booty, are the losing teams. Eva Le Queen and Gala Varo receive negative critiques, and are announced as the bottom two. They lip-sync to "Take On Me" by A-ha. Gala Varo wins the lip-sync and Eva Le Queen sashays away.: Guest Judge: Carson Kressley; Mini-Challenge: Reading is Fundamental; Mini-Challenge Winner: Kitty Scott-Claus; Mini-Challenge Prize: A $2,500 cash tip; Main Challenge: In teams, star in sequels of "Boobie"; Runway Theme: Browntown; Challenge Winner: Kween Kong; Challenge Prize: A $10,000 cash tip; Bottom Two: Eva Le Queen and Gala Varo; Lip-Sync Song: "Take On Me" by A-ha; Eliminated: Eva Le Queen
6	"It's 5 O'Clock Somewhere"	September 13, 2024
For this week's mini-challenge, the queens apply makeup during a turbulent plane simulation. Tessa Testicle wins the mini-challenge. For the main challenge, the queens create a cocktail dress using materials from another queen's suitcase.: Alyssa Edwards (Tessa Testicle's suitcase); Gala Varo (Kween Kong's suitcase); Kween Kong (Gala Varo's suitcase); Kitty Scott-Claus (Pythia's suitcase); Nehellenia (Kitty Scott-Claus' suitcase); Pythia (Nehellenia's suitcase); Soa de Muse (Vanity Vain's suitcase); Tessa Testicle (Alyssa Edwards' suitcase); Vanity Vain (Soa de Muse's suitcase); On the runway, category is It's 5 O'Clock Somewhere. Kween Kong, Pythia and Tessa Testicle receive positive critiques, with Tessa Testicle winning the challenge. Gala Varo, Soa de Muse and Vanity Vain receive negative critiques, with Vanity Vain being safe. Gala Varo and Soa de Muse lip-sync to "Bang Bang" by Jessie J, Ariana Grande and Nicki Minaj. Gala Varo wins the lip-sync and Soa de Muse sashays away.: Guest Judge: Jasmine Tookes; Mini-Challenge: Apply makeup during a turbulent plane simulation; Mini-Challenge Winner: Tessa Testicle; Mini-Challenge Prize: A $2,500 cash tip; Main Challenge: Create a cocktail dress using materials from another queen's suitcase; Runway Theme: It's 5 O'Clock Somewhere; Challenge Winner: Tessa Testicle; Challenge Prize: A $10,000 cash tip; Bottom Two: Gala Varo and Soa de Muse; Lip-Sync Song: "Bang Bang" by Jessie J, Ariana Grande and Nicki Minaj; Eliminated: Soa de Muse
7	"Snatch Game of Love"	September 20, 2024
For this week mini-challenge, the queens make a profile for the new dating app "Archer". Gala Varo wins the mini-challenge. For the main challenge, the queens play the Snatch Game of Love. Javier Calvo and Javier Ambrossi star as the celebrity contestants. The cast consisted of: Vying for Javier Calvo's love: Kween Kong as King Schlong; Gala Varo as Laura León; Kitty Scott-Claus as Diana, Princess of Wales; Nehellenia as Valentino; Vying for Javier Ambrossi's love are: Vanity Vain as Loreen; Alyssa Edwards as Annie Oakley; Tessa Testicle as Susanne Bartsch; Pythia as Zeus; On the runway, category is Eat Me. Kitty Scott-Claus, Nehellenia and Pythia receive positive critiques, with Kitty Scott-Claus winning the challenge. Tessa Testicle, Vanity Vain and Gala Varo receive negative critiques, with Tessa Testicle being safe. Gala Varo and Vanity Vain lip-sync to "Mah Na Mah Na" by The Muppets. Vanity Vain wins the lip-sync and Gala Varo sashays away.: Guest Judges: Javier Calvo and Javier Ambrossi; Mini-Challenge: Make a profile for the new dating app "Archer"; Mini-Challenge Winner: Gala Varo; Mini-Challenge Prize: A $2,500 cash tip; Main Challenge: Snatch Game of Love; Runway Theme: Eat Me!; Challenge Winner: Kitty Scott-Claus; Challenge Prize: A $10,000 cash tip; Bottom Two: Gala Varo and Vanity Vain; Lip-Sync Song: "Mah Na Mah Na" by The Muppets; Eliminated: Gala Varo
8	"Mmm... A Rich International Roast"	September 27, 2024
For this week's main challenge, the queens perform a roast. On the runway, category is Blow Me Away. Alyssa Edwards, Kitty Scott-Claus, Kween Kong and Nehellenia receive positive critiques, with Kitty Scott-Claus and Kween Kong both winning the challenge. Pythia, Tessa Testicle and Vanity Vain receive negative critiques, with Tessa Testicle being safe. Pythia and Vanity Vain lip-sync to "I Drove All Night" by Céline Dion. Vanity Vain wins the lip-sync and Pythia sashays away.: Guest Judge: Graham Norton; Main Challenge: Perform a roast; Runway Theme: Blow Me Away; Challenge Winners: Kitty Scott-Claus and Kween Kong; Challenge Prize: A $10,000 cash tip, split between the winners; Bottom Two: Pythia and Vanity Vain; Lip-Sync Song: "I Drove All Night" by Céline Dion; Eliminated: Pythia
9	"Re-United Nations Makeover"	October 4, 2024
For this week's mini-challenge, the queens answer questions from RuPaul by raising the name of the queen they think fitted the most based on the question. Kween Kong wins the mini-challenge. For the main challenge, the queens makeover one of the eliminated queens.: Alyssa Edwards and Eva Le Queen; Kitty Scott-Claus and Miranda Lebrão; Kween Kong and Soa de Muse; Nehellenia and Pythia; Tessa Testicle and Athena Likis; Vanity Vain and Gala Varo; On the runway, category is Drag Family Resemblance. Alyssa Edwards, Kween Kong and Nehellenia receive positive critiques, with Nehellenia winning the challenge. Kitty Scott-Claus, Tessa Testicle and Vanity Vain receive negative critiques, with Tessa Testicle being safe. Kitty Scott-Claus and Vanity Vain lip-sync to "Believe" by Cher. Kitty Scott-Claus wins the lip-sync and Vanity Vain sashays away.: Guest Judge: Dianne Brill; Mini-Challenge: Who Is She?; Mini-Challenge Winner: Kween Kong; Mini-Challenge Prize: A $2,500 cash tip; Main Challenge: Makeover one of the eliminated queens; Runway Theme: Drag Family Resemblance; Challenge Winner: Nehellenia; Challenge Prize: A $10,000 cash tip; Bottom Two: Kitty-Scott Claus and Vanity Vain; Lip-Sync Song: "Believe" by Cher; Eliminated: Vanity Vain
10	"There's No Place Like Home"	October 11, 2024
For this week's main challenge, the queens create tourism ads showcasing their country. On the runway, category is Star Trek: Queens in Outer Space. Alyssa Edwards, Kitty Scott-Claus and Nehellenia receive positive critiques, with Alyssa Edwards winning the challenge. Kween Kong and Tessa Testicle receive negative critiques, and are announced as the bottom two. They lip-sync to "Don't Leave Me This Way" by Thelma Houston. Kween Kong wins the lip-sync and Tessa Testicle sashays away.: Guest Judge: Ts Madison; Main Challenge: Create a tourism ad showcasing your country; Runway Theme: Star Trek: Queens in Outer Space; Challenge Winner: Alyssa Edwards; Challenge Prize: A $10,000 cash tip; Bottom Two: Kween Kong and Tessa Testicle; Lip-Sync Song: "Don't Leave Me This Way" by Thelma Houston; Eliminated: Tessa Testicle
11	"Global Lip Sync Lalaparuza"	October 18, 2024
This week, the eliminated queens participate in the Global Lip-Sync LaLaPaRuZa Smackdown. In the first round, Vanity Vain gets picked first and chooses Eva Le Queen to lip-sync against. Eva Le Queen then chooses "Just What They Want" by RuPaul. Eva Le Queen wins the lip-sync and Vanity Vain loses. Soa de Muse is next to be picked and chooses Tessa Testicle to lip-sync against. Tessa Testicle then chooses "A.S.M.R Lover" by RuPaul. Soa de Muse wins the lip-sync and Tessa Testicle loses. Athena Likis is next to be picked and chooses Pythia to lip-sync against. Pythia then chooses "Jealous Of My Boogie (Gomi and RasJek Edit)" by RuPaul. Athena Likis wins the lip-sync and Pythia loses. The final two queens, Gala Varo and Miranda Lebrão, lip-sync to "Cha Cha Bitch" by RuPaul. Gala Varo wins the lip-sync and Miranda Lebrão loses. In the second round, Gala Varo gets picked first and chooses Eva Le Queen to lip-sync against. Eva Le Queen then chooses "Call Me Mother" by RuPaul. Gala Varo wins the lip-sync and Eva Le Queen loses. The final two queens, Athena Likis and Soa de Muse, lip-sync to "U Wear It Well" by RuPaul. Soa de Muse wins the lip-sync and Athena Likis loses. In the final round, Gala Varo and Soa de Muse lip-sync to "The Beginning" by RuPaul. Soa de Muse wins the lip-sync and earns the title of Global Lip-Sync Assassin.: Main Challenge: Participate in a Global Lip-Sync LaLaPaRuZa Smackdown; Lip-Sync Songs: "Just What They Want" by RuPaul, "A.S.M.R Lover" by RuPaul, "Jealous Of My Boogie (Gomi and RasJek Edit)" by RuPaul, "Cha Cha Bitch" by RuPaul, "Call Me Mother" by RuPaul, "U Wear It Well" by RuPaul and "The Beginning" by RuPaul; Round 1 Lip-Sync Winners: Eva Le Queen, Soa de Muse, Athena Likis and Gala Varo; Round 2 Lip-Sync Winners: Gala Varo and Soa de Muse; Top Two: Gala Varo and Soa de Muse; Global Lip-Sync Assassin: Soa de Muse; Challenge Prize: A $50,000 cash tip courtesy of Klarna
12	"Dance Like The World Is Watching"	October 25, 2024
For the final challenge of the season, the queens write, record and perform their own verses to the original song "Dance Like the World is Watching". On the runway, category is Best Drag on Earth. The eliminated queens all return to the runway, where it is announced that Soa de Muse is this season's Miss Global Peacemaker. The four finalists are told that they will be lip-syncing to "Bad Romance" by Lady Gaga. It is announced that Alyssa Edwards is the winner, leaving Kitty Scott-Claus, Kween Kong and Nehellenia as the runners-up.: Guest Judge: Ariadna Gutiérrez; Main Challenge: Write, record and perform their own verses to the original song "Dance Like the World is Watching"; Runway Theme: Best Drag on Earth; Miss Global Peacemaker: Soa de Muse; Lip-Sync Song: "Bad Romance" by Lady Gaga; Runners-up: Kitty Scott-Claus, Kween Kong and Nehellenia; Winner of RuPaul's Drag Race Global All Stars Season One: Alyssa Edwards
