= Slaycation season 1 =

Canadian reality television series

Slaycation
- Series 1
- No. of contestants: 6
- Winner: Luxx Noir London
- Runners-up: BOA; Jada Shada Hudson; Kandy Muse; Kerri Colby; Lawrence Chaney
- No. of episodes: 6

Release
- Original network: Crave; WOW Presents Plus (International)
- Original release: 31 December 2024

Season chronology
- Next → Season 2

The first season of Slaycation, a Canadian reality television series, premiered on December 31, 2024 on the television network Crave. The series is a non-competitive spin-off of Canada's Drag Race within the Drag Race franchise. The season follows the personal and professional lives of six Drag Race alumni as they vacation in a winter retreat in Canada, and compete for the title of 'Queen of Slaycation'.

The series was first confirmed by World of Wonder and Blue Ant Studios in September 2023. The cast was revealed on June 6, 2024. It features queens previously from Canada's Drag Race along with the American RuPaul's Drag Race and RuPaul's Drag Race All Stars, and the British RuPaul's Drag Race UK.

In August 2024 it was revealed the vacation location would be in The Blue Mountains, Ontario. On December 31, 2024, Slaycation premiered on Crave in Canada and on WOW Presents Plus in the rest of the world. Luxx Noir London won the title of 'Queen of Slaycation'.

== Contestants ==
Ages, names, and cities stated are at time of filming.

Contestants of Slaycation Season 1 and their backgrounds
Contestant	Age	Hometown	Original season(s)	Original placement(s)	Outcome
Luxx Noir London	23	East Orange, United States	US Season 15	3rd place	Winner
BOA	28	Toronto, Canada	Canada Season 1	7th place	Runner-up
Jada Shada Hudson	39	Toronto, Canada	Canada Season 3	Runner-up	Runner-up
Kandy Muse	28	Brooklyn, United States	US Season 13	Runner-up	Runner-up
Kandy Muse	28	Brooklyn, United States	All Stars 8	Runner-up	Runner-up
Kerri Colby	26	Los Angeles, United States	US Season 14	9th place	Runner-up
Lawrence Chaney	26	Las Vegas, United States	UK Series 2	Winner	Runner-up

== Contestant progress ==
Legend:

Luxx Noir London won Slaycation season 1.
BOA, Jada Shada Hudson, Kandy Muse, Kerri Colby and Lawrence Chaney were the runners-up.
Jada Shada Hudson was voted Turn Up Queen (TUQ).
WIN indicates that the contestant won the challenge.
SAFE indicates that the contestant was declared safe

Contestants progress with placements in each episode
Contestant	Episode								
Contestant	1	2		3	4	5	6		
Luxx Noir London	WIN	SAFE	SAFE	WIN	WIN	SAFE	WIN	Winner	
BOA	SAFE	SAFE	SAFE	SAFE	WIN	SAFE	SAFE	Runner-up	
Jada Shada Hudson	SAFE	SAFE	SAFE	SAFE	SAFE	SAFE	SAFE	R-up	TUQ
Kandy Muse	SAFE	SAFE	SAFE	WIN	SAFE	SAFE	SAFE	Runner-up	
Kerri Colby	SAFE	WIN	TOP2	SAFE	SAFE	SAFE	SAFE	Runner-up	
Lawrence Chaney	SAFE	SAFE	WIN	SAFE	SAFE	WIN	SAFE	Runner-up	

== Episodes ==
No. overall	No. in season	Title	Original release date
1	1	"Jada"	December 31, 2024
2	2	"Kerri"	December 31, 2024
3	3	"Lawrence"	December 31, 2024
4	4	"BOA"	December 31, 2024
5	5	"Kandy"	December 31, 2024
6	6	"Luxx"	December 31, 2024
Sash Games: Snow Queen: Luxx; Mixology Queen: Kerri; Tea Queen: Lawrence; Ice Queen: Luxx & Kandy; Pole Queen: BOA & Luxx; Queen of Slay: Lawrence; Queen of the Hills: Luxx; Turn Up Queen: Jada; Queen of Slaycation: Luxx
