= Pandora Nox =

Austrian drag performer

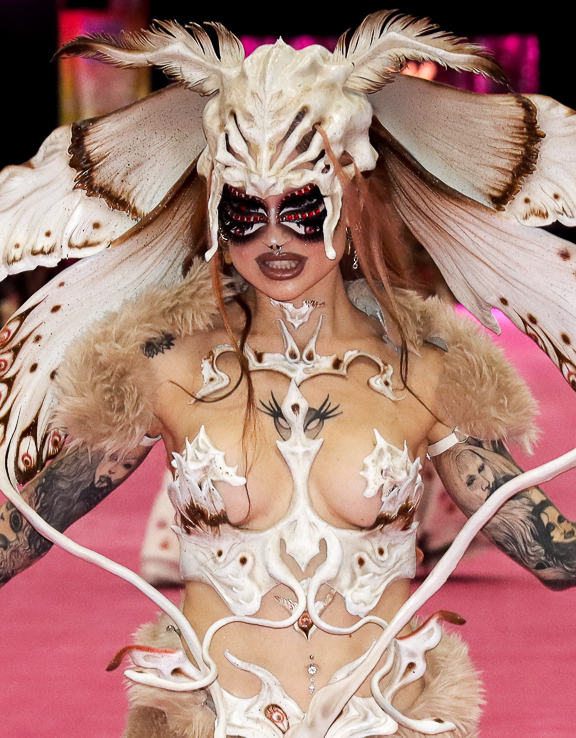
- Pandora Nox at RuPaul's DragCon LA, 2024
- Born: Pandora Bösmüller
- Occupation: Drag queen
- Years active: 2023–present
- Television: Drag Race Germany (season 1)
- Website: pandoranox.com

Pandora Bösmüller, better known by her stage name Pandora Nox, is an Austrian performer. She is best known for winning the first season of Drag Race Germany and was crowned as "Germany's First Drag Superstar".

== Career ==
Pandora Nox competed on the first season of Drag Race Germany, which began airing on 5 September 2023. She became the first cisgender female performer to compete in the German reality series, and the third in the Drag Race franchise, after Victoria Scone and Clover Bish. During her time on the show, she placed in the bottom twice, eliminating Tessa Testicle and Loreley Rivers. With two main challenge wins and a runway win, she was a finalist alongside Metamorkid and Yvonne Nightstand. In the finale episode, she had to lip-sync to Conchita Wurst's "Rise Like a Phoenix" (2014). Pandora Nox won the series, and became the franchise's first AFAB and first lesbian winner.

== Filmography ==
=== Television ===
List of television credits, with selected details
Title	Year	Role	Notes	Ref.
Drag Race Germany	2023	Contestant	Winner	
Bring Back My Girls	2024	Guest		
