= Gianni Jovanovic =

German entrepreneur, activist, author and artist

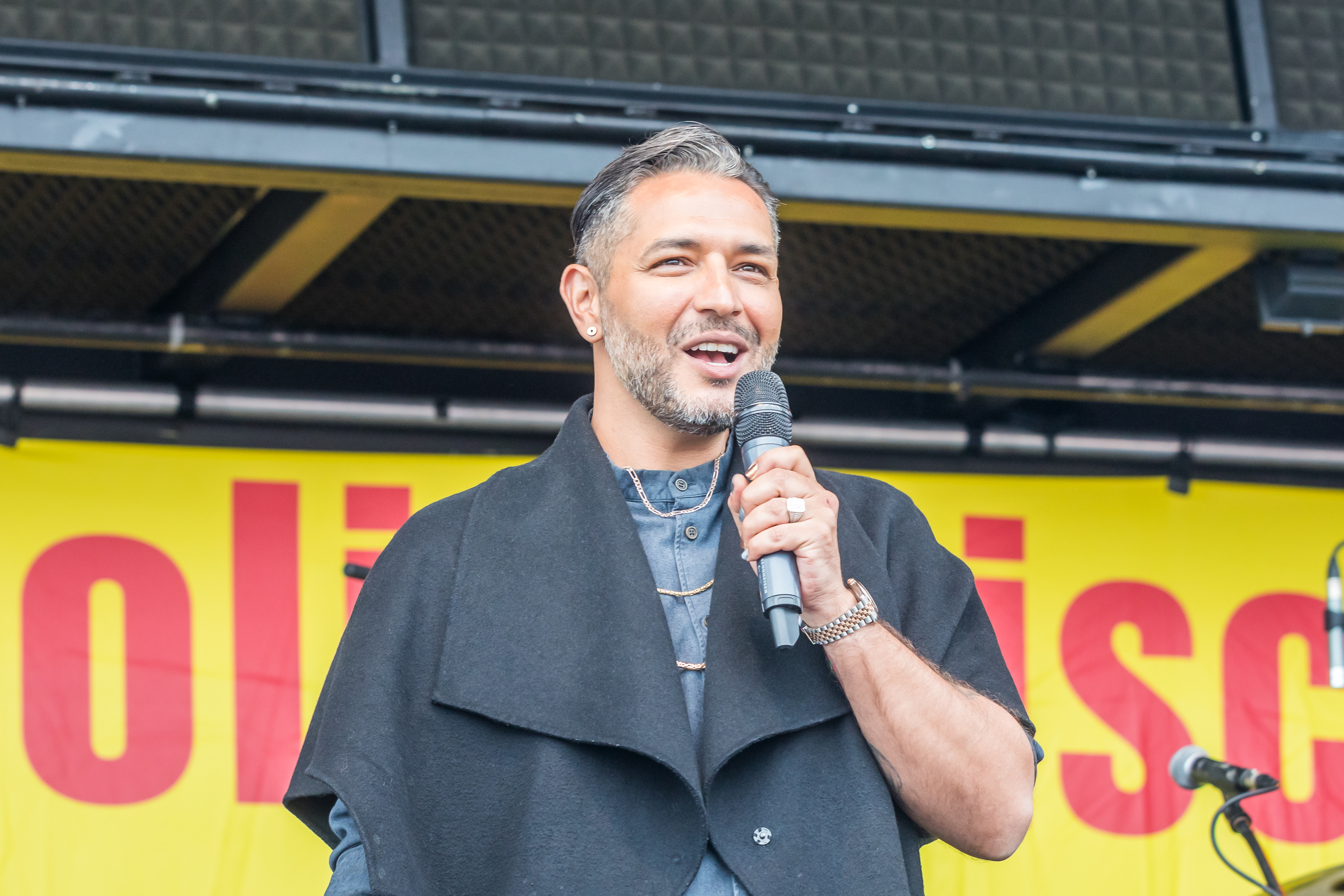
- Television: Drag Race Germany

Gianni Jovanovic (born 1978) is an entrepreneur, activist, performer, actor and judge on the series Drag Race Germany. He is gay.

== Life ==
Jovanovic is the son of a Roma family. When he was 14 years old, his parents married him to a girl of the same age. A short time later, the two became parents of a son and a daughter. In his mid-20s, Gianni Jovanovic came out as gay and separated from his wife. He is a grandfather of two and has been married to his husband for many years. He is considered one of the loudest voices of the Rom*nja and Sinti*zze community. In 2015 he founded the initiative ‘Queer Roma’ among other initiatives and he campaigns for LGBTQ+ people who have been discriminated against in his community. Gianni fights for the right to self-determination and for more visibility for minorities within a minority. In 2020, he decided to call his collective ‘Colors of Change’. His goal is also to give people of colour and black people more space in the LGBTQ+ community as racism is also a big problem in the Queer community. He says, "We are the children of the small majorities. Our voices need to be heard in society."

Jovanovic wrote a book about his experiences on being gay and part of the Roma community in Germany.
