= Ariadna Gutiérrez =

Colombian-American model, actress, and beauty pageant titleholder

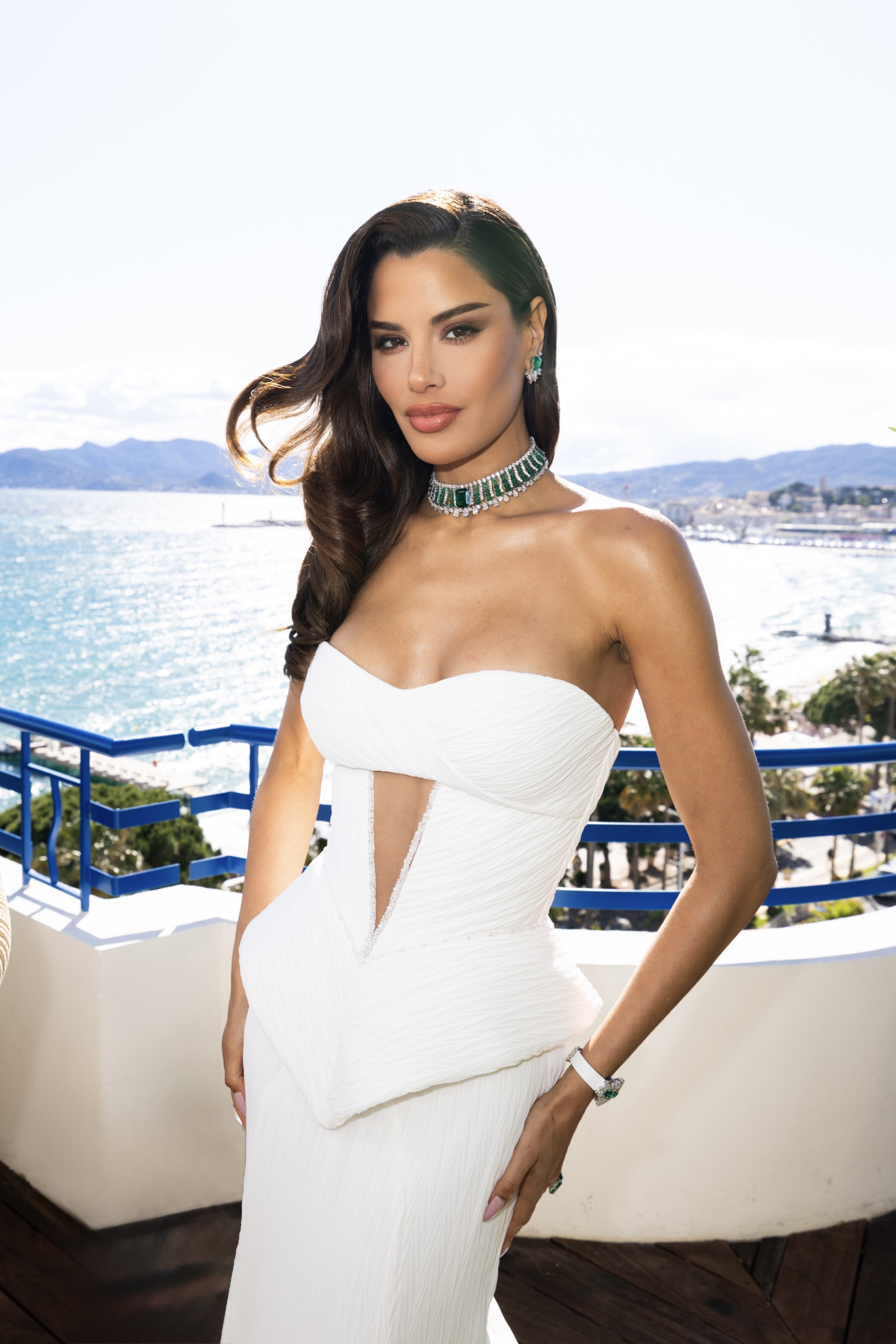
- Ariadna Gutierrez at the 79th Cannes Film Festival 2026
- Born: Ariadna María Gutiérrez Arévalo; 25 December 1993 (age 32); Sincelejo, Sucre, Colombia
- Height: 1.78 m (5 ft 10 in)
- Beauty pageant titleholder
- Title: Miss Sucre 2014; Miss Colombia 2014
- Years active: 2015–present
- Hair color: Brown
- Eye color: Brown
- Major competitions: Miss Colombia 2014; (Winner); Miss Universe 2015; (1st Runner-Up) (Note: During the live telecast, at first, Gutiérrez was announced as the winner due to an announcement mistake by Steve Harvey. Once Harvey apologized to the audience, Gutiérrez was announced as the 1st Runner-Up, and Pia Wurtzbach as the winner.)

Ariadna María Gutiérrez Arévalo (Spanish pronunciation: [aˈɾjaðna ɣuˈtjeres]; born 25 December 1993) is a Colombian actress, model and beauty pageant titleholder who was crowned Miss Colombia 2014. She represented Colombia at the Miss Universe 2015 competition on 20 December 2015 and placed first runner-up after host Steve Harvey mistakenly announced her as the winner. After pageantry, Gutiérrez appeared in the film XXX: Return of Xander Cage and tied for third place on Celebrity Big Brother 1.

== Early life ==
Ariadna María Gutiérrez Arévalo was born in Sincelejo, Sucre, Colombia. When she was seven months old, Gutiérrez's parents moved to Barranquilla, where she was raised. Gutiérrez studied at the German School of Barranquilla. She is a cousin of Miss Universe 2014 and Miss Colombia 2013 winner Paulina Vega.

== Career ==
Gutiérrez was awarded as Miss Sucre 2014. She was subsequently crowned as Miss Colombia 2014. Currently, Gutiérrez works as a professional model.

Gutiérrez competed at the Miss Colombia 2014, representing the Sucre Department, where she won the title of Miss Colombia, gaining the department's very first win at the Miss Colombia pageant. The version of the pageant Gutiérrez won was its 80th edition held on 17 November 2014, in Cartagena de Indias.

On 16 November 2015, Gutierrez crowned her successor, Andrea Tovar, as Miss Colombia 2015.

Gutiérrez represented Colombia at the 64th Miss Universe pageant and she was mistakenly crowned the winner by host Steve Harvey. However, after Gutiérrez's crowning, Harvey realized that he had misread the result and should have announced her as the first runner-up and Pia Wurtzbach of the Philippines as the winner. This was originally the second time having a back-to-back victory after Venezuela from 2008–2009, since Paulina Vega is also from Colombia.

Gutiérrez later called the experience "humiliating" and declared that the television producers handled the mistake poorly. At a Colombian radio station, she remarked that it was a "great injustice and very humiliating for me."

After pageantry, Gutiérrez appeared the 2017 film XXX: Return of Xander Cage with American actor Vin Diesel. She later took part in the first American season of the reality show competition Celebrity Big Brother. Gutiérrez was evicted on finale night, placing tied 3rd/4th with Mark McGrath. She still works as a model.

== Personal life ==
Gutiérrez is the cousin of Miss Colombia 2013 and Miss Universe 2014 winner Paulina Vega.

== Filmography ==
=== Television ===
Year	Title	Role	Notes
2015	Primer Plano	Herself	
2015	Miss Universe 2015	Herself	Contestant - 1st Runner-Up (Note: During the live telecast, at first, Gutiérrez was announced as the winner due to an announcement mistake by Steve Harvey. Once Harvey apologized to the audience, Gutiérrez was announced as the 1st Runner-Up, and Pia Wurtzbach as the winner.)
2016	Steve Harvey	Herself	Miss Colombia
2018	Celebrity Big Brother	Herself	Houseguest - 3rd/4th place
2019	The World's Best	Herself	
2022	Everybody Loves Natti	Herself	4 episodes
2022	Don't Cancel Me with Amara La Negra	Herself	1 episode
2024	La Casa de los Famosos 4	Herself	Housemate - 12th Place
2024	RuPaul's Drag Race Global All Stars	Herself	Season 1, Episode 12, guest judge

=== Film ===
Year	Title	Role
2017	XXX: Return of Xander Cage	Lola
2023	At Midnight	Another Woman
2023	The Midway Point	Mrs. Friedman

=== Music videos ===
Year	Artist	Title
2017	Carlos Vives	Al Filo de Tu Amor
2025	Maluma	BRONCEADOR

== In popular culture ==
Gutiérrez was impersonated by James Leyva, stage name "Valentina," on season 9, episode 6 of RuPaul's Drag Race.

== Notes ==
Awards and achievements
Preceded by (United States) Nia Sanchez	Miss Universe 1st Runner-Up; 2015	Succeeded by (Haiti) Raquel Pélissier
Preceded by Paulina Vega	Miss Colombia; 2014	Succeeded by Andrea Tovar
Preceded by Andrea Peñuela	Miss Sucre; 2014	Succeeded by Paula Correa
