= Ruby Nox =

Brazilian drag performer

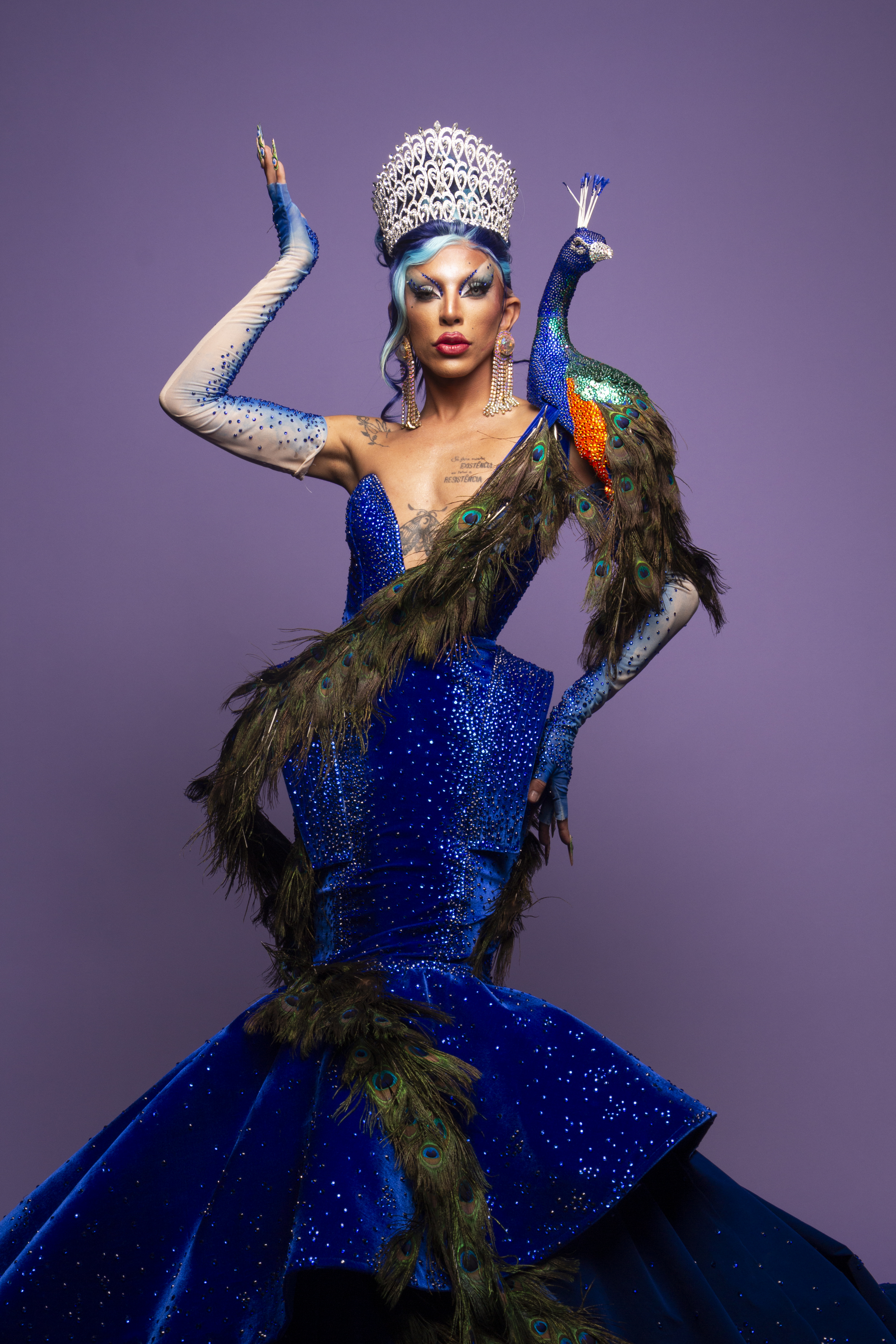
- Born: Anderson Braz
- Occupation: Drag performer
- Known for: Winner of Drag Race Brasil season 2

Ruby Nox is the stage name of Anderson Braz, a Brazilian drag performer and the winner of the second season of the television series Drag Race Brasil.

== Personal life ==
Ruby Nox is from Recife, Pernambuco. She is genderfluid.

== See also ==
- List of drag queens
