= Barbie Breakout =

Drag performer

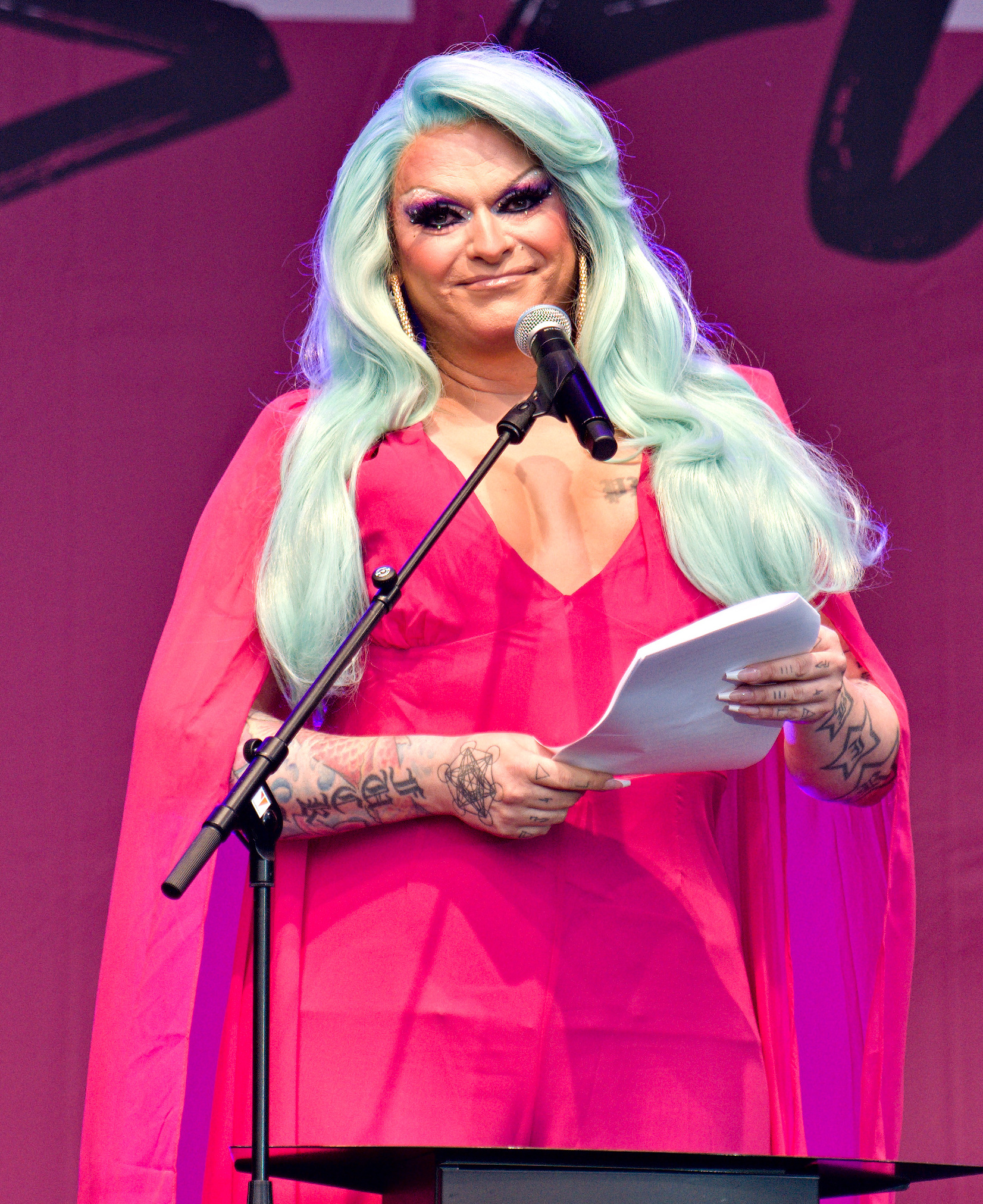
- Barbie Breakout in 2023
- Born: Timo Pfaff; April 27, 1978 (age 47); Hofheim, Hesse, Germany
- Occupation: Drag queen
- Television: Drag Race Germany

Barbie Breakout is the stage name of Timo Pfaff, a German drag performer, podcaster, author, make up artist and LGBTQ activist. She is a host and judge on Drag Race Germany.

== Filmography ==
=== Television ===
- Männer zum Knutschen (2012)
- Shopping Queen (2020)
- The Diva in Me (2022)
- Drag Race Germany (2023)
- Bring Back My Girls (2024)

=== Podcasts ===
- Tragisch, aber geil
- 2old2dieYoung
- Bartschatten

== Bibliography ==
- Tragisch, aber geil 2.0 (2020)
- Die Diva ist ein Mann (2006), Coverfoto, Seite 126, Porträt von Ingo Lenz
