= Slaycation =

Canadian reality television series

- Genre: Reality television
- Country of origin: Canada
- Original language: English
- No. of seasons: 2
- No. of episodes: 12

Production
- Production location: The Blue Mountains
- Camera setup: Multi-camera
- Running time: 37–47 minutes
- Production companies: Blue Ant Media; World of Wonder

Original release
- Network: Crave
- Release: December 31, 2024 – present

Slaycation is a Canadian reality television series focusing on the personal and professional lives of six drag performers, while they vacation together in a winter retreat. Six episodes were released simultaneously through television network Crave on December 31, 2024.

The series is co-produced by Blue Ant Media and World of Wonder. It marks the second overall spinoff of Canada's Drag Race, following Canada's Drag Race: Canada vs. the World.

== Series overview ==
Series	Episodes	Originally released	
Series	Episodes	First released	Last released
1	6	31 December 2024	
2	6	December 12, 2025	December 26, 2025

=== Season 1 ===
The premiere season featured contestants from the United Kingdom, Canada, and United States.

=== Season 2 ===
The second season of Slaycation was officially announced by Crave on March 6, 2025, alongside a cast of 6 queens, featuring past competitors from the United States, France, Germany, and Canada.

== Production ==
=== Development ===
Crave first reported that a Canadian reality television series Slaycation was set to be in development on September 11, 2023. It is co-produced by Blue Ant Media and World of Wonder. The slated premise of the series is where six drag performers vacation together in a winter cabin while participating in activities, and organize a drag performance for the local community.

=== Casting ===
Entertainment Weekly first revealed the cast of the series featuring various contestants from the Drag Race franchise on June 6, 2024. The first season features BOA, Jada Shada Hudson, Kandy Muse, Kerri Colby, Lawrence Chaney, and Luxx Noir London.

In March 2025, a second season of the series was announced, with its cast slated to consist of Alyssa Edwards, Miss Fiercalicious, Nicky Doll, Silky Nutmeg Ganache, Tessa Testicle and Xana.

== Release ==
A teaser trailer was released through YouTube, revealing the cast and premise on June 6, 2024. A couple of months later, a five-minute preview was released via X (formerly Twitter), showcasing the cast entering the vacation property located in The Blue Mountains, Ontario.
