= DesiRée Beck =

Brazilian drag performer

- Born: Michael Cardoso
- Occupation: Drag performer
- Known for: Competing on Queens on the Run, Drag Race Brasil (season 2), and Drag Race México: Latina Royale

DesiRée Beck is the stage name of Michael Cardoso, a Brazilian drag performer. She competed on Queens on the Run, the second season of Drag Race Brasil, and Drag Race México: Latina Royale.

== Career ==
DesiRée was inspired by RuPaul's Drag Race, and began their profession as a drag in the Âncora de Marujo bar.

Drag performer DesiRée Beck competed on Queens on the Run and the second season of Drag Race Brasil.

== Personal life ==
Cardoso is based in Salvador, Bahia.

== Filmography ==
- Queens on the Run (2023)
- Drag Race Brasil (season 2; 2025)
- Drag Race México: Latina Royale (2026)
