= Queens on the Run =

2023 Brazilian reality television series

- Also known as: Caravana das Drags
- Genre: Reality competition
- Written by: Maristela Mattos; Jô Hallack
- Directed by: Bettina Hanna
- Presented by: Ikaro Kadoshi; Xuxa Meneghel
- Judges: Ikaro Kadoshi; Xuxa Meneghel
- Country of origin: Brazil
- No. of seasons: 1
- No. of episodes: 9

Production
- Camera setup: Multi-camera
- Running time: 47–51 minutes
- Production company: Amazon Studios

Original release
- Network: Amazon Prime Video
- Release: 14 April 2023 – present

Queens on the Run (Portuguese: Caravana das Drags) is a Brazilian reality competition television series that premiered on 14 April 2023 through Amazon Prime Video. The series is hosted by Brazilian hostess Xuxa Meneghel and drag queen Ikaro Kadoshi.

== Summary ==
Ten drag queens are traveling throughout Brazil, from Rio de Janeiro, Goiânia, Diamantina, Salvador, Recife, Fortaleza, São Luís and Belém doing artistic drag tests to win the cash price of R$150,000, a crown and the title of the sovereign queen.

== Contestants ==
Contestants of Queens on the Run
Contestant	Age	Hometown	Outcome
Hellena Borgys	33	São Paulo, São Paulo	Winner
Gaia do Brasil	32	São José do Rio Preto, São Paulo	2nd place
DesiRée Beck	32	Salvador, Bahia	3rd place
Frimes	32	São Luís, Maranhão	4th place
Ravena Creole	34	Rio de Janeiro	5th place
Chandelly Kidman	26	Teresina, Piauí	6th place
Enme	27	São Luís, Maranhão	7th place
Robytt Moon	42	São Paulo, São Paulo	8th place
Morgante	29	São Paulo, São Paulo	9th place
Slovakia	36	São Paulo, São Paulo	10th place

== Contestant progress ==
Legend:

Hellena Borgys won Queens on the Run season 1.
Gaia do Brasil was the runner-up.
WIN indicates that the contestant won the challenge.
SAFE indicates that the contestant was declared safe by the judges.
BTM indicates that the contestant was up for elimination.
ELIM (Eliminated) indicates that the contestant was eliminated.
DISQ (Disqualified) indicates that the contestant was disqualified.
Guest indicates that the contestant returned as a guest.

Progress of contestants including rank/position in each episode
Contestant	Episode								
Contestant	1	2	3	4	5	6	7	8	9
Hellena Borgys	SAFE	SAFE	WIN	BTM	SAFE	SAFE	WIN	Guest	Winner
Gaia do Brasil	SAFE	SAFE	SAFE	SAFE	BTM	BTM	BTM	Guest	Runner-up
DesiRée Beck	SAFE	WIN	BTM	SAFE	WIN	SAFE	SAFE	Guest	Eliminated
Frimes	BTM	SAFE	BTM	WIN	SAFE	WIN	BTM	Guest	Eliminated
Ravena Creole	SAFE	SAFE	SAFE	SAFE	BTM	ELIM		Guest	Guest
Chandelly Kidman	WIN	BTM	BTM	BTM	SAFE	DISQ		Guest	
Enme	SAFE	BTM	SAFE	SAFE	ELIM			Guest	Guest
Robytt Moon	SAFE	SAFE	SAFE	ELIM				Guest	Guest
Morgante	BTM	ELIM						Guest	Guest
Slovakia	ELIM							Guest	Guest
