= BOA (drag queen) =

Canadian drag queen

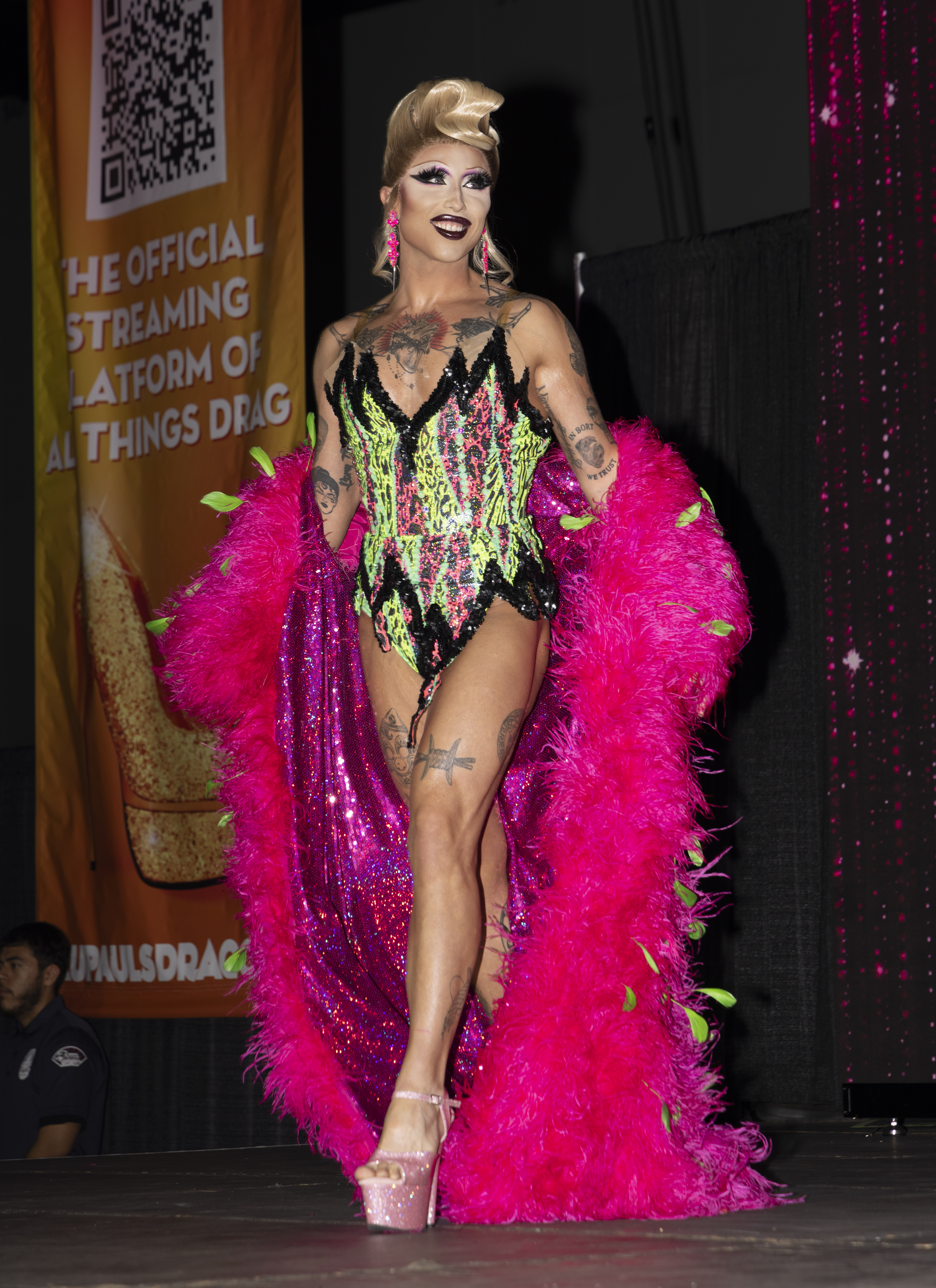
- BOA at RuPaul's DragCon LA, 2023
- Born: Ryan William Boa; May 9, 1995 (age 30); Windsor, Ontario, Canada
- Other names: Bitch on Arrival
- Occupation: Drag queen
- Television: Canada's Drag Race (season 1)

BOA (an abbreviation for Bitch on Arrival) is the stage name of Ryan William Boa (born May 9, 1995), a drag performer most known for competing on season 1 of Canada's Drag Race.

== Early life ==
Boa was born in Windsor, Ontario.

== Career ==
Boa's drag persona is BOA. BOA worked as a drag queen for six years before competing on season 1 of Canada's Drag Race, where she placed seventh. In 2021, she released the debut single "Gettin' It Done". In July 2021, she performed alongside Juice Boxx, Anastarzia Anaquway and others at the inaugural Drag Starz at the Manor, a new drag event in Guelph, Ontario.

== Personal life ==
Boa lives in Toronto.

In May 2015, Boa was physically attacked after a show by a man he had brought home to hang out with following a performance, after the attacker pressured Boa to have sex and Boa declined. The attacker broke Boa's nose, and stole his wallet, laptop and cellphone. He was arrested two weeks later in Vancouver, British Columbia, following another unrelated crime, and was identified as Boa's attacker; in September 2016 he pled guilty to the robbery and a breach of probation charge from prior crimes, although the physical assault charge was dropped. Boa has since continued to speak out about the issue of violence in the LGBTQ+ community, including speaking about the incident in a Canada's Drag Race episode.

Boa proposed to his boyfriend in 2020. Boa revealed in an episode of the reality television series Slaycation that he was diagnosed as HIV-positive when he went to rehab.

== Discography ==
=== Singles ===
- Gettin' It Done (2020)

== Filmography ==
=== Television ===
- Canada's Drag Race (season 1)
- Slaycation (2024)
