= Victoria Shakespears =

Drag performer and make-up artist

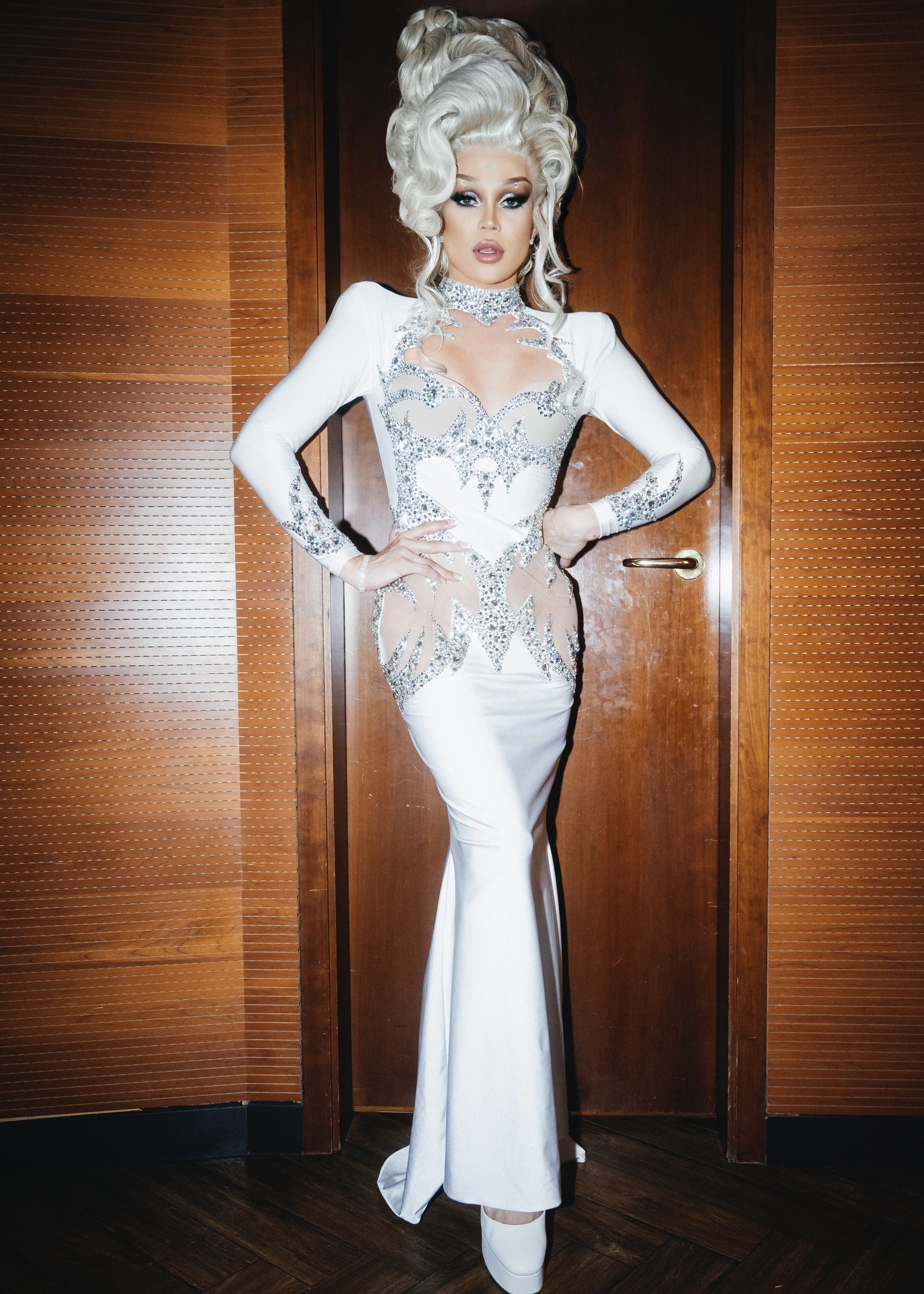
- Victoria Shakespears at the Premiere of Drag Race Germany, 2023
- Born: Vitor Hugo Souza; February 15, 1994 (age 32); Goiânia, Goiás, Brazil
- Occupations: Drag queen; make-up artist; Performer; Songwriter; TV Personality; Recording Artist
- Years active: 2019–present
- Television: Drag Race Germany
- Website: victoriashakespears.com

Victoria Shakespears is the stage name of Vitor Hugo Souza Guimarães, a Brazilian-Swiss drag queen, performer, television personality, recording artist, and make-up artist who competed on the first season of Drag Race Germany. Souza is from Basel, Switzerland.

== Early life ==
Vitor Hugo Souza was born on February 15, 1994, in Goiânia, Brazil. He moved with his mother to Basel, Switzerland in 2006 at age 12. As a child, Souza grew up with Britney Spears as his biggest inspiration, while the other kids he knew were fans of Ronaldo. He got to know drag culture thanks to Parisian drag queen Stella Rocha, when she hired him as a make-up artist for a fashion show in Lyon in 2019.

== Career ==
Victoria Shakespears' art and performances are inspired by 2000s pop music, with Anahí, Britney Spears, Thalía, Wanessa Camargo and Mariah Carey among her primary references. In 2023, Victoria Shakespears competed on the first season of Drag Race Germany. She said she was not just participating in the show to win, but also to have the opportunity to share her story and inspire other people. On November 14, 2023, she won the title of the Miss Darling (Miss Congeniality) of her season.

== Personal life ==
Souza came out of the closet at age 18, which he celebrated by buying his first Barbie. He is in a long-term relationship.

== Filmography ==
=== Television ===
Year	Title	Role	Notes
2023	Drag Race Germany	Contestant	9 episodes
2024	Bring Back My Girls (Season 3)	Herself	1 episode
2025	Drag Race Brasil (Season 2)	Guest Judge	1 episode
