= Miss Colombia 2014 =

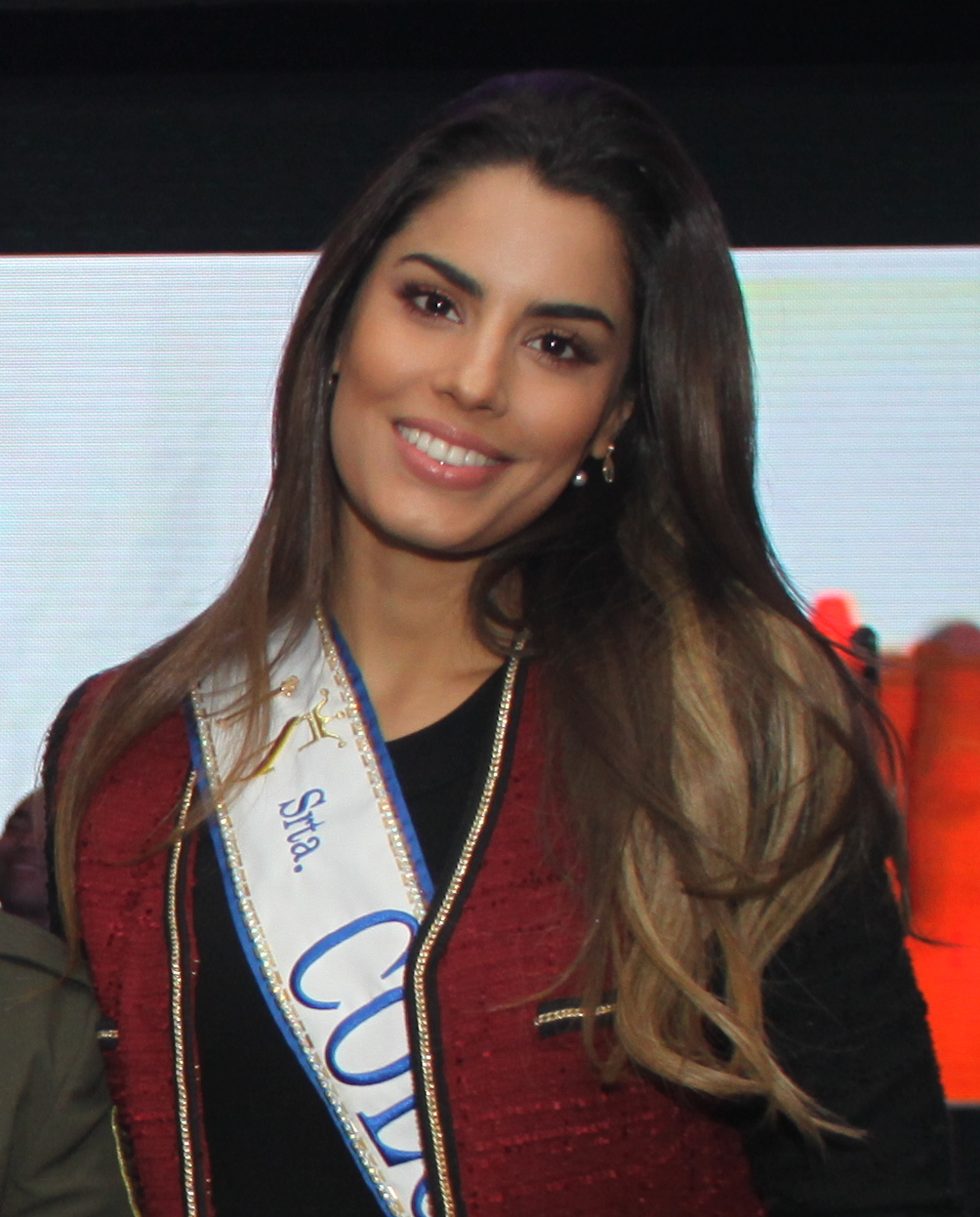
- Ariadna Gutiérrez, Miss Colombia 2014
- Date: November 17, 2014
- Presenters: Paola Turbay, Paula Andrea Betancourt, Carolina Gomez, Taliana Vargas
- Venue: Auditorio Getsemani-Centro de Convenciones Julio César Turbay Ayala Cartagena de Indias, Colombia
- Broadcaster: RCN TV
- Entrants: 26
- Placements: 10
- Withdrawals: Nariño
- Winner: Ariadna Gutiérrez; Sucre
- Congeniality: Maria Fernanda Daza; Guajira
- Best National Costume: Alejandra Camacho; Atlántico
- Photogenic: Daniela Castañeda; Meta

Miss Colombia 2014 was the 62nd edition of the Miss Colombia pageant. It was held on November 17, 2014 in Cartagena, Colombia.

At the end of the event, Paulina Vega of Atlántico crowned Ariadna Gutiérrez of Sucre as Miss Colombia 2015. She represented Colombia in Miss Universe 2015 and placed 1st Runner-Up after host Steve Harvey mistakenly announced her as the winner. Amid celebration of the 80th anniversary of the national beauty pageant, the department of Sucre obtained the crown for the first.

== Results ==
=== Placements ===
==== Color keys ====
- The contestant won in an International pageant.
- The contestant was a Finalist/Runner-up in an International pageant.
- The contestant was a Semi-Finalist in an International pageant.
- The contestant did not place.

Placement	Contestant	International Placement
Miss Colombia 2014	Sucre – Ariadna Gutiérrez	1st Runner-Up – Miss Universe 2015 (Note: During the live telecast, at first, Gutiérrez was first announced as the winner due to an announcement mistake by Steve Harvey. Once Harvey apologized to the audience, Gutiérrez was announced as the 1st Runner-Up, and Pia Wurtzbach as the winner.)
1st Runner-Up	Antioquia – Natalia Ochoa Calle	Unplaced – Miss International 2015
2nd Runner-Up	Cauca – Jessica Paola Castañeda Guevara	Top 17 – Top Model of the World 2015
3rd Runner-Up	Bogotá - Viviana Alexandra Dávila Giraldo (Resigned)	
4th Runner-Up	Meta – Daniela Andrea Castañeda Pardo (Assumes the title of 3rd Runner-Up)	1st Runner-Up – Miss United Continents 2015
Top 10	Bolívar – Alejandra Camacho Piñeres; Guajira – *María Fernanda Daza Ramírez (Assumes the title of 4th Runner-Up); Huila – Laura María Saavedra Gómez; Norte de Santander – Natalia Guzmán Contreras; Quindío – Daniela Andrea Gutiérrez Cuartas	

=== Scores ===
Legend
Miss Colombia 2014-2015
1st Runner-up
2nd Runner-up
3rd Runner-up
4th Runner-up
Top 10

Department	Evening Gown	Swimsuit	Average
Sucre	9.9 (1)	9.9 (1)	9.90 (1)
Antioquia	9.8 (2)	9.8 (2)	9.80 (2)
Cauca	9.7 (4)	9.7 (3)	9.70 (4)
Bogotá	9.8 (2)	9.7 (3)	9.75 (3)
Meta	9.7 (4)	9.7 (3)	9.70 (4)
Bolívar	9.6 (6)	9.7 (3)	9.65 (6)
Guajira	9.6 (6)	9.5 (7)	9.55 (7)
Huila	9.6 (6)	9.5 (7)	9.55 (7)
Quindío	9.6 (6)	9.4 (9)	9.50 (9)
Norte de Santander	9.5 (10)	9.4 (9)	9.45 (10)
Córdoba	9.2		
Valle	9.0		
Atlántico	8.9		
Boyaca	8.9		
Bucaramanga	8.9		
Cundinamarca	8.9		
Santander	8.9		
Cartagena	8.8		
Risaralda	8.8		
Caquetá	8.7		
Magdalena	8.7		
San Andrés	8.7		
Tolima	8.7		
Arauca	8.6		
Chocó	8.6		
Cesar	8.5		

== Specials Awards ==
Award	Winner
Best Regional Costume (Mejor Traje Artesanal)	Bolívar - Alejandra Camacho Piñeres
Miss Congeniality (Mejor Compañera)	Guajira - Maria Fernanda Daza Ramirez
Miss Photogenic (Señorita Fotogenica)	Meta - Daniela Andrea Castañeda Pardo
Best Face (Rostro Jolie)	Sucre - Ariadna María Gutiérrez Arévalo
Best Body (Figura Bodytech)	Bogotá D.C. - Viviana Alexandra Dávila Giraldo
Queen of the Police (Reina de la Policía)	Sucre- Ariadna María Gutiérrez Arévalo
Miss Elegance (Señorita Elegancia Primatela)	Sucre - Ariadna María Gutiérrez Arévalo
Zapatilla Real	Atlántico - Mayra Alejandra De León Charris
Miss Punctuality (Miss Puntualidad)	Huila - Laura María Saavedra Gómez

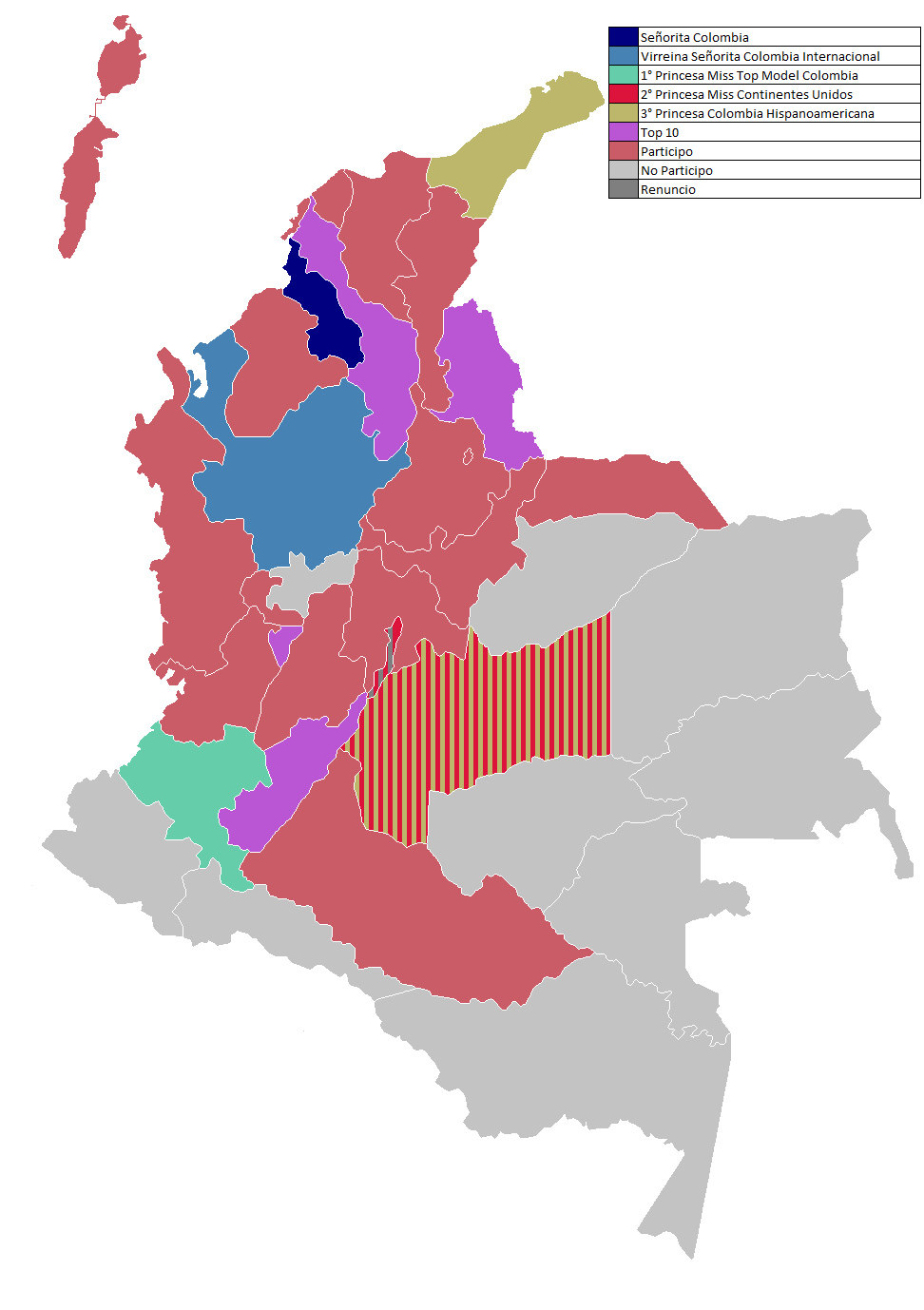
Señorita Colombia 2014

== Delegates ==
26 delegates have been selected to compete.

Department / District	Name	Age	Height	Hometown
Antioquia	Natalia Ochoa Calle	22	177 cm (5 ft 9 1/2 in)	Medellín
Arauca	Lynda Shirley Guedes Castro	23	176 cm (5 ft 9 1/2 in)	Arauca
Atlántico	Mayra Alejandra de León Charris	22	171 cm (5 ft 7 1/2 in)	Barranquilla
Bogotá D.C.	Viviana Dávila Giraldo	22	180 cm (5 ft 11 in)	Bogotá
Bolívar	Alejandra Camacho Piñeres	22	175 cm (5 ft 9 in)	Cartagena
Boyaca	Laura Katherine Orjuela Holguín	20	172 cm (5 ft 7 1/2 in)	Tunja
Bucaramanga A.M.	Juliana Argüello Delgado	19	178 cm (5 ft 10 in)	Bucaramanga
Caquetá	Jennifer Triviño Medina	22	172 cm (5 ft 7 1/2 in)	Florencia
Cartagena, D.T. and C.	Gabriela Margarita Puente Sojo	19	175 cm (5 ft 9 in)	Cartagena
Cauca	Jessica Paola Castañeda Guevara	22	178 cm (5 ft 10 in)	Popayán
Cesar	María Paulina Núñez García	24	170 cm (5 ft 7 in)	Valledupar
Chocó	Iliam Fariza Zapata Jensen	23	163 cm (5 ft 4 in)	Quibdó
Córdoba	María Eugenia Baglio Doria	23	172 cm (5 ft 7 1/2 in)	Monteria
Cundinamarca	Maribel Mendoza Londoño	22	168 cm (5 ft 6 in)	
La Guajira	María Fernanda Daza Ramírez	23	174 cm (5 ft 8 1/2 in)	Riohacha
Huila	Laura María Saavedra Gómez	22	172 cm (5 ft 7 1/2 in)	Bogotá
Magdalena	Yesica Paola Morán Hernández	24	178 cm (5 ft 10 in)	
Meta	Daniela Andrea Castañeda Pardo	21	175 cm (5 ft 9 in)	Villavicencio
Norte de Santander	Natalia Guzmán Contreras	19	178 cm (5 ft 10 in)	Cúcuta
Quindío	Daniela Gutiérrez Cuartas	21	178 cm (5 ft 10 in)	Armenia
Risaralda	Manuela Velasco Arias	19	173 cm (5 ft 8 in)	Pereira
San Andrés, P. and S.C.	Annie Zulleine Jay Newball	18	167 cm (5 ft 5 1/2 in)	San Andrés
Santander	Lina María Ardila Flórez	22	172 cm (5 ft 7 1/2 in)	Bucaramanga
Sucre	Ariadna María Gutiérrez Arévalo	20	178 cm (5 ft 10 in)	Sincelejo
Tolima	María Paula Melo Rodríguez	22	170 cm (5 ft 7 in)	Ibagué
Valle	Nathaly Rojas Correa	19	179 cm (5 ft 10 1/2 in)	Cali

=== Debuts ===
- Bucaramanga A.M.

=== Returns ===
- Sucre – Ariadna Gutiérrez was Miss Sucre 2013 and is supposed to represent her department last year, but did not compete for personal reasons.

=== Withdrawals ===
- Nariño – Leydi Carolina Carvajal, Miss Nariño 2014 withdrew due to a second degree sprain to her right ankle. Therefore, the department did not participate in this year's contest but was invited to all special events.

=== Replacements ===
- Antioquia – Natalia Ochoa, 1st Runner-Up of Señorita Antioquia 2014, replaced Paola Builes Aristizábal.
- Chocó – Andrea Tovar was appointed as Señorita Chocó 2014 and was registered at the national competition supported by the Miss Colombia 2001, Vanessa Alexandra Mendoza Bustos, while Iliam Fariza Zapata was chosen by the competition chaired by the Departmental Committee, which makes the department having two titleholders. After several meetings at the head of the National Competition Policy, it is decided that Iliam Fariza Zapata will participate this year, while Andrea Tovar will participate next year. Tovar later became Miss Colombia 2015.
- Córdoba – María Eugenia Baglio Doria replaced Señorita Córdoba 2014, Leidy Carolina Espinosa Galván who got dethroned.
- Magdalena – Yesica Paola Morán Hernández, 1st Runner-Up of Señorita Magdalena 2014 replaced, Estefany Lizeth Orozco Amel due to a severe relapse in her health. She had medical complications that made it impossible for her to compete.
