= Kelly Heelton =

Brazilian-German drag performer

- Born: Fausto Israel de Souza; September 15, 1981 (age 45); São Paulo, São Paulo, Brazil
- Occupation: Drag queen
- Television: Drag Race Germany
- Website: kellyheelton.com

Kelly Heelton is the stage name of Fausto Israel de Souza, a Brazilian-born German drag performer who competed on the first season of Drag Race Germany. She was born in Brazil and resides in Bad Schwalbach.

== Life ==
Kelly Heelton comes from a musical family, with her father being a guitarist and her aunt an opera singer. At the age of 6, Heelton was already a soloist in a church gospel choir in her hometown of São Paulo. From 1998 to 2002 she studied the arts at the Universidade de São Paulo. In addition to her first musical productions, she worked as a dance teacher. In 2003, Heelton moved to Fulda, Hesse as an au pair, but later moved to Hamburg, where her cousin starred in the musical production of The Lion King. Since 2008, Heelton has been the singer of the bands Cocoda and Nativa Brasileira. She also teaches children singing, dancing and acting.

== Career ==
Kelly Heelton made her debut as a drag queen in 2005 in Cologne, when she filled in for another drag queen in a Destiny’s Child tribute trio. In this performance, she took on the role of Kelly Rowland, from which her drag name is derived. She has performed worldwide, including Spain, Italy, Poland, China, and Russia. In 2016, she hosted her own drag competition: Kelly Heelton's Next Drag Superstar, broadcast on YouTube. 14 drag queens competed against each other, based on RuPaul's Drag Race. In the first season of Drag Race Germany, she took 4th place. She was eliminated in the 10th episode in a lip sync against Metamorkid.

== Filmography ==
- Drag Race Germany
- Bring Back My Girls
- Drag Race Brasil (2025; season 2); guest judge
