= Vanity Vain =

Swedish drag performer

- Born: Linus Hoflund Mauritz; Linköping, Sweden
- Television: Drag Race Sverige; RuPaul's Drag Race Global All Stars

Vanity Vain is the stage name of Linus Hoflund Mauritz, a Swedish drag performer who competed on Drag Race Sverige and on RuPaul's Drag Race Global All Stars.

== Early life ==
Mauritz was born in Linköping, Sweden.

== Career ==
Vanity Vain competed on the first season of Drag Race Sverige, placing third overall.

In 2024, she competed in the first season of RuPaul's Drag Race Global All Stars. On the second episode, she won a lip-sync contest against Eva Le Queen to "Paranoia" by Danna Paola.

== Personal life ==
Mauritz resides in Stockholm.

== Filmography ==
- Drag Race Sverige (2023) - 3rd place
- RuPaul's Drag Race Global All Stars (2024) - 6th place

== Discography ==
=== Featured singles ===
Title	Year	Album
"Every Queen (Cast Version)" (Robert Fux, Kayo featuring The Cast of Drag Race Sverige)	2023	Non-album single
"Everybody Say Love (Back Door Gals Europop Mix)" (The Cast of RuPaul's Drag Race Global All Stars)	2024	Non-album single

== See also ==
- List of drag queens
- List of people from Stockholm
