= Dianne Brill =

American fashion designer

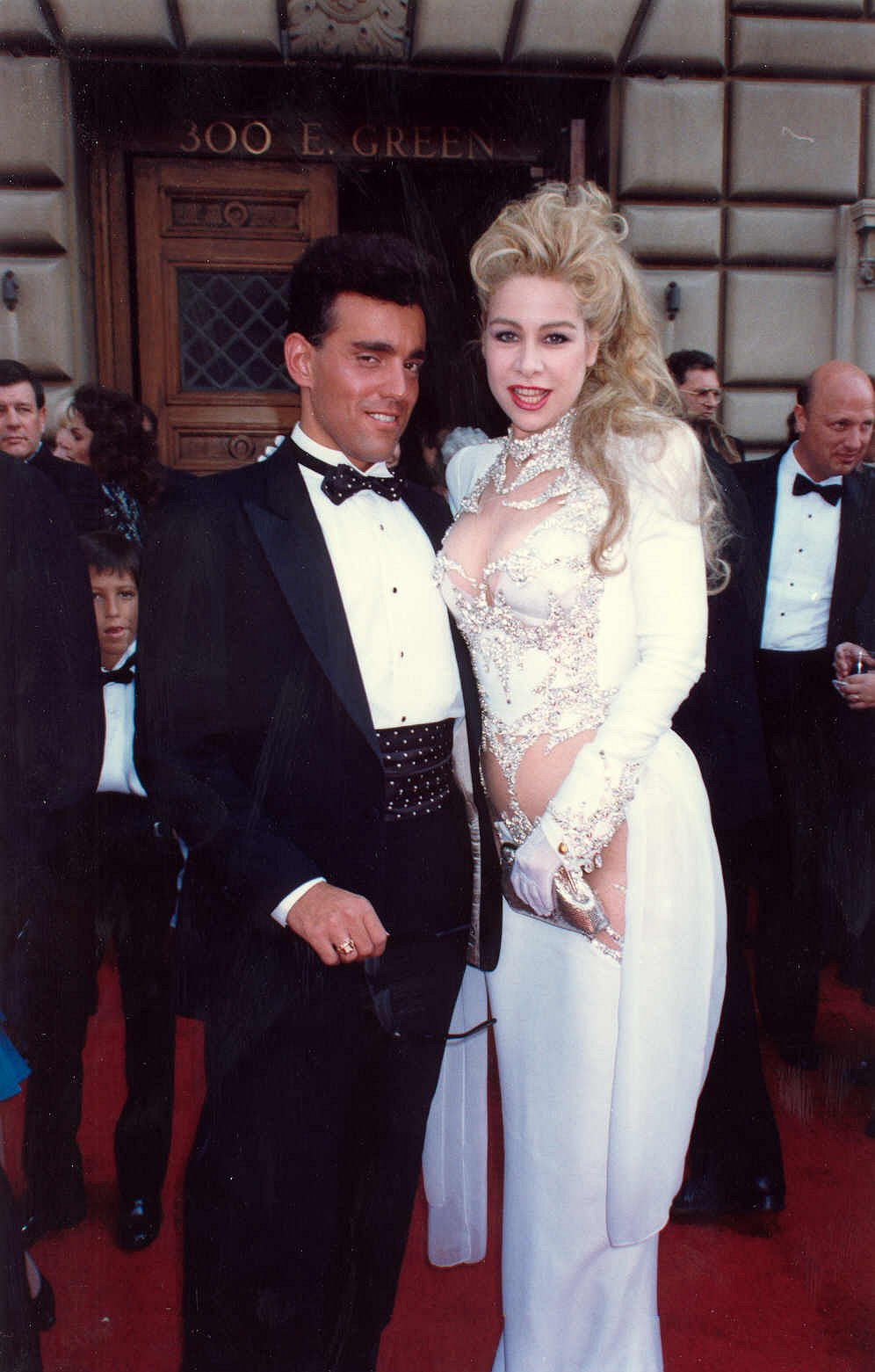
- Dianne Brill with Jim Turilli on the red carpet at the 40th Annual Primetime Emmy Awards
- Born: Tampa, Florida, U.S.
- Occupations: Fashion designer; model; author; club kid

Dianne Brill is an American fashion designer, model, author, and former club kid. Brill was a fixture in the 1980s downtown club scene in New York City. Andy Warhol deemed her the "Queen of the Night".

== Early life ==
Brill was born on April 6, 1958 in Tampa, Florida, and at the age of 19, she moved to London, where she became a promoter with Estée Lauder.

== Career ==
In the early 1980s, Brill moved to New York City and became a fixture in the city's nightlife. She was married to German nightlife impresario Rudolf Piper, who was the owner of Danceteria. Her club life is discussed in the book Disco Bloodbath: A Fabulous but True Tale of Murder in Clubland (later becoming the film Party Monster).

Following her life in New York, Brill became an author. In 1992, she released the book Boobs, Boys and High Heels, or How to Get Dressed in Just Under Six Hours, in which she shares her beauty tips and gives fashion and romance advice.

In the 1990s, Brill married German film producer Peter Völkle, with whom she has three children, and they relocated to Germany. She is a judge on the series Drag Race Germany.

== Books ==
- Brill, Dianne (1992). Boobs, Boys and High Heels, or How to Get Dressed in Just Under Six Hours. Penguin Books. ISBN 978-0-14-013264-9.
