= Tessa Testicle =

Swiss drag performer

- Born: Lorenzo Ciciro; 1997 or 1998 (age 28–29)
- Television: Drag Race Germany; RuPaul's Drag Race Global All Stars

Tessa Testicle (born 1997 or 1998) also known as Tessa T. or Tessa Testicle Edwards is the stage name of Lorenzo Ciciro, a Swiss drag performer who competed on Drag Race Germany and RuPaul's Drag Race Global All Stars.

== Career ==
Tessa Testicle competed on the first season of Drag Race Germany at the age of 25. She placed in the bottom of three challenges, and eighth overall. She is a member of the Haus of Edwards.

== Personal life ==
Ciciro is from Basel and has studied fashion design. He creates content on OnlyFans. He is multilingual, and speaks English, Italian, French, German, and Swiss German.

== Filmography ==
- Drag Race Germany (2023) - 8th place
- RuPaul's Drag Race Global All Stars (2024) - 5th place
- Touch-Ups with Raven (2025)
- Slaycation season 2 (2025) - Runner-Up
