= Drag Race Germany =

German reality competition television series

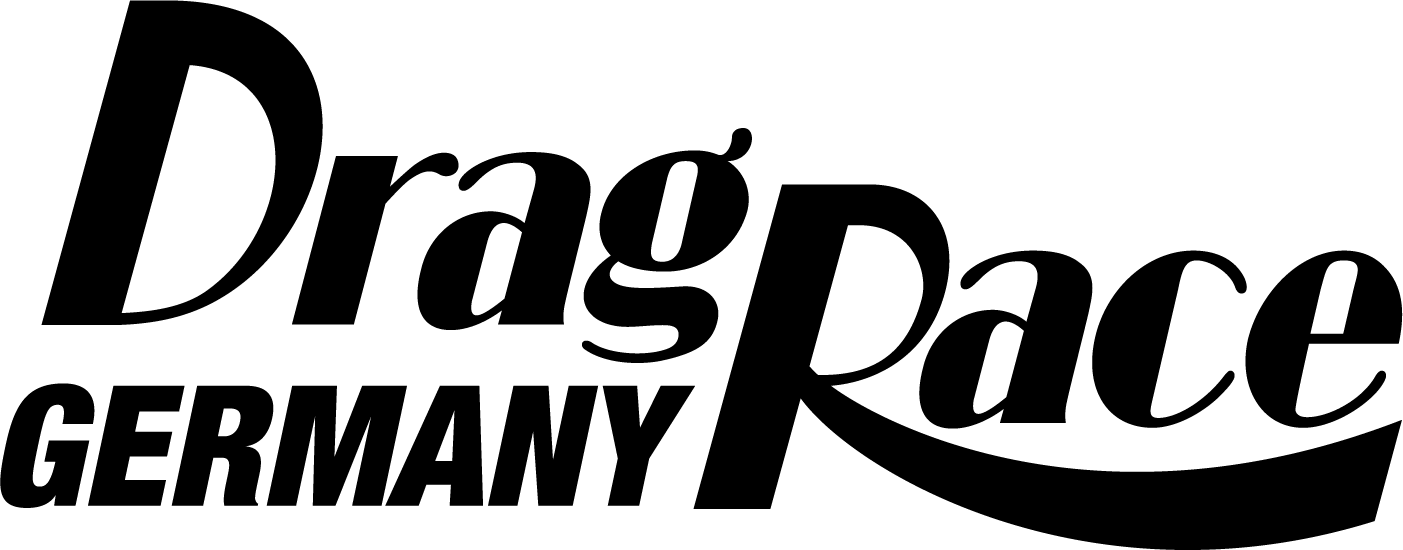
- Genre: Reality competition
- Based on: RuPaul's Drag Race
- Directed by: Maximilian Schmige
- Presented by: Barbie Breakout; Gianni Jovanovic
- Judges: Barbie Breakout; Gianni Jovanovic; Dianne Brill
- Opening theme: RuPaul's Drag Race Theme
- Ending theme: Rock It (To the Moon)
- Country of origin: Germany
- Original language: German
- No. of seasons: 1
- No. of episodes: 12

Production
- Executive producers: RuPaul Charles; Tom Campbell; Fenton Bailey; Randy Barbato
- Camera setup: Multi-camera
- Production companies: MTV Entertainment Studios; World of Wonder

Original release
- Network: MTV and Paramount+ (Austria, Germany, and Switzerland); WOW Presents Plus (International)
- Release: 5 September – 21 November 2023

Drag Race Germany is a German reality competition series, based on the original American series, RuPaul's Drag Race. The series is broadcast on MTV and Paramount+ in Germany, Austria, and Switzerland and on WOW Presents Plus internationally.

Drag Race Germany is the fifteenth international adaptation of the American reality competition series RuPaul's Drag Race, following Chilean, Thai, British, Canadian, Dutch, Australian and New Zealand, Spanish, Italian, French, Filipino, Belgian, Swedish, Mexican, and Brazilian versions.

== Production ==
Originally in 2013, the German company Phantomfilm acquired the production rights to create a German adaptation of RuPaul's Drag Race. World of Wonder, the production company behind RuPaul's Drag Race, confirmed the upcoming adaptation by releasing a teaser trailer featuring RuPaul. Taç Romey, the spokesperson for Phantomfilm at the time, announced that there would be little changes to the format, other than it having greater focus on comedy to adapt to the country's market, and that the show was going to air on a mainstream network, although the company was still negotiating with various channels for the broadcast. Ultimately, the company's licensing rights expired, which led to a second attempt of producing Drag Race in Germany.

In 2019, RedSeven Entertainment has opened casting for a reality competition focused about drag queens. The show, with the name of Queen of Drags, aired in the same year on ProSieben. Bambi Mercury, one of the contestants on the show, later revealed in a podcast that the series was supposed to be a German adaptation of Drag Race franchise. However, after RedSeven failed to get licensing rights, the production company was forced to change the format of the show.

On August 8, 2022, World of Wonder posted three casting calls on social media. The casting calls were for new potential Drag Race adaptations in Brazil, Germany, and Mexico. The deadline for the potential competitors was set for August 26, with the deadline for audition video submission set for September 9, 2022. In December, it was confirmed that the new editions of the Drag Race franchise will premiere "on MTV/Paramount+ in their respective territories."

Barbie Breakout and Gianni Jovanovic were confirmed as hosts and head judges in August 2023. A third judge, American fashion designer Dianne Brill was confirmed the next day, as well as the premiere date, which was set for September 5. The cast was revealed on August 15, 2023, featuring contestants from all over the DACH zone.

The winner of the first season of Drag Race Germany, is Pandora Nox from Vienna, Austria. This also makes her the first AFAB winner in the history of the franchise.

== Contestants ==
Ages, names, and cities stated are at time of filming.

Contestants of Drag Race Germany and their backgrounds
Contestant	Age	Hometown	Outcome
Pandora Nox	29	Vienna, Austria	Winner
Metamorkid	24	Vienna, Austria	Runners-up
Yvonne Nightstand	29	Berlin, Germany	Runners-up
Kelly Heelton	41	Wiesbaden, Germany	4th place
Loreley Rivers	24	Düsseldorf, Germany	5th place
Victoria Shakespears	29	Basel, Switzerland	6th place (Note: Victoria Shakespears was voted Miss Darling by fellow contestants.)
Nikita Vegaz	38	Berlin, Germany	7th place
Tessa Testicle	25	Basel, Switzerland	8th place
LéLé Cocoon	23	Frankfurt, Germany	9th place
The Only Naomy	22	Cologne, Germany	10th place
Barbie Q	25	Munich, Germany	11th place

== Contestant progress ==
Legend:

Pandora Nox won Drag Race Germany.
Metamorkid and Yvonne Nightstand were the runners-up.
Victoria Shakespears was voted Miss Darling (Miss D) by fellow contestants.
LéLé Cocoon was voted Fan Favourite (FF) by the viewers.
WIN indicates that the contestant won the challenge.
RW (Runway Winner) indicates that the contestant won the runway challenge.
TOP2 indicates that the contestant was one of the two best performing in the challenge, but lost the lip sync to win it.
SAFE indicates that the contestant was declared safe by the judges.
BTM (Bottom) indicates that the contestant was up for elimination.
ELIM (Eliminated) indicates that the contestant was eliminated.

Contestants progress with placements in each episode
Contestant	Episode											
Contestant	1	2	3	4	5	6	7	8	9	10	11	12
Pandora Nox	WIN	SAFE	SAFE	RW	BTM	SAFE	WIN	BTM	SAFE	SAFE	Guest	Winner
Metamorkid	SAFE	SAFE	WIN	SAFE	SAFE	SAFE	SAFE	SAFE	WIN	BTM	Guest	Runner-up
Yvonne Nightstand	SAFE	SAFE	SAFE	SAFE	SAFE	SAFE	SAFE	WIN	TOP2	WIN	Guest	Runner-up
Kelly Heelton	SAFE	SAFE	SAFE	SAFE	SAFE	WIN	WIN	SAFE	SAFE	ELIM	Guest	Guest
Loreley Rivers	SAFE	WIN	SAFE	SAFE	WIN	BTM	BTM	ELIM			Guest	Guest
Victoria Shakespears	BTM	BTM	SAFE	SAFE	SAFE	BTM	ELIM				Miss D	Guest
Nikita Vegaz	SAFE	SAFE	SAFE	WIN	SAFE	ELIM					Guest	Guest
Tessa Testicle	BTM	SAFE	BTM	BTM	ELIM						Guest	Guest
LéLé Cocoon	SAFE	SAFE	SAFE	ELIM							Guest	FF (Note: The Fan Favourite was not announced on the show.)
The Only Naomy	SAFE	SAFE	ELIM								Guest	Guest
Barbie Q	SAFE	ELIM									Guest	Guest

== Lip syncs ==
Legend:

The contestant was eliminated after their first time in the bottom.
The contestant was eliminated after their third time in the bottom.
The contestant was eliminated after their fourth time in the bottom.
The contestant won the lip sync to win the challenge.
The contestant won the Lip Sync for the Crown and was declared the winner of the season.

Episode	Contestants			Song	Eliminated
1	Tessa Testicle	vs.	Victoria Shakespears	"Lieben wir" (Shirin David)	None
2	Barbie Q	vs.	Victoria Shakespears	"Break My Heart" (Dua Lipa)	Barbie Q
3	Tessa Testicle	vs.	The Only Naomy	"Holding Out for a Hero" (Bonnie Tyler)	The Only Naomy
4	LéLé Cocoon	vs.	Tessa Testicle	"About Damn Time" (Lizzo)	LéLé Cocoon
5	Pandora Nox	vs.	Tessa Testicle	"Atemlos durch die Nacht" (Helene Fischer)	Tessa Testicle
6	Loreley Rivers vs. Nikita Vegaz vs. Victoria Shakespears			"Flowers" (Miley Cyrus)	Nikita Vegaz
7	Loreley Rivers	vs.	Victoria Shakespears	"Nobody's Supposed to Be Here (Hex Hector Dance Mix)" (Deborah Cox)	Victoria Shakespears
8	Loreley Rivers	vs.	Pandora Nox	"Chandelier" (Sia)	Loreley Rivers
Episode	Contestants			Song	Winner
9	Metamorkid	vs.	Yvonne Nightstand	"Rock Me Amadeus" (Falco)	Metamorkid
Episode	Contestants			Song	Eliminated
10	Kelly Heelton	vs.	Metamorkid	"Heart to Break" (Kim Petras)	Kelly Heelton
Episode	Final contestants			Song	Winner
12	Metamorkid vs. Pandora Nox vs. Yvonne Nightstand			"Rise Like a Phoenix" (Conchita Wurst)	Pandora Nox

== Guest judges ==
Listed in chronological order:

- Shirin David, singer-songwriter and rapper (episode 1)
- KonstantinosTheStylist, fashion designer (episodes 3 and 5)
- Denis We, choreographer (episode 4)
- Raffaela Zollo, YouTube personality (episode 6)
- Estefania Elisa, social media personality (episodes 7, 8 and 9)
- Sasha Velour, winner of the ninth season of RuPaul's Drag Race (episode 10)

=== Special guests ===
Guests who appeared in episodes, but did not judge on the main stage.

Episode 1

- Walter Gomez, photographer

Episode 3

- Nubia Ortega, musician and vocal coach

Episode 12

- Norvina, president of Anastasia Beverly Hills

== Episodes ==
No. overall	No. in season	Title	Original release date
1	1	"Willkommen in Deutschland" "Auftakt"	5 September 2023
Eleven new queens enter the workroom. For the first mini-challenge, the queens do a Bavarian Princess photoshoot. Pandora Nox wins the mini-challenge. For the main challenge, the queens present their signature drag look on the runway. On the runway, category is Signature Drag Look. Barbie Q, LéLé Cocoon and Pandora Nox receive positive critiques, with Pandora Nox winning the challenge. Nikita Vegas, Tessa Testicle and Victoria Shakespears receive negative critiques, with Nikita Vegas being safe. Tessa Testicle and Victoria Shakespears lip-sync to "Lieben wir" by Shirin David. They both win the lip-sync and no one goes home.: Guest Judge: Shirin David; Mini-Challenge: Bavarian Princess photoshoot; Mini-Challenge Winner: Pandora Nox; Mini-Challenge Prize: A €1,000 cash tip; Main Challenge: Present your signature drag look on the runway; Runway Theme: Signature Drag Look; Challenge Winner: Pandora Nox; Bottom Two: Tessa Testicle and Victoria Shakespears; Lip-Sync Song: "Lieben wir" by Shirin David; Eliminated: None
2	2	"Fetish" "Fetisch"	12 September 2023
For this week's mini-challenge, the queens get into quick drag and run on a treadmill. Yvonne Nightstand wins the mini-challenge. For the main challenge, the queens create an outfit made from fetish materials. On the runway, category is Fetish. Loreley Rivers, Pandora Nox and Tessa Testicle receive positive critiques, with Loreley Rivers winning the challenge. Barbie Q, Kelly Heelton and Victoria Shakespears receive negative critiques, with Kelly Heelton being safe. Barbie Q and Victoria Shakespears lip-sync to "Break My Heart" by Dua Lipa. Victoria Shakespears wins the lip-sync and Barbie Q is the first queen to sashay away.: Mini-Challenge: Get into quick drag and run on a treadmill; Mini-Challenge Winner: Yvonne Nightstand; Mini-Challenge Prize: A €1,000 cash tip; Main Challenge: Create an outfit made from fetish materials; Runway Theme: Fetish; Challenge Winner: Loreley Rivers; Bottom Two: Barbie Q and Victoria Shakespears; Lip-Sync Song: "Break My Heart" by Dua Lipa; Eliminated: Barbie Q; Farewell Message: "¡Si! oder vielleicht No? Well... Bye. Pandora, wenn du mit jemand anders schläfst, töte ich dich ;)" ("Yes! or maybe No? Well... Bye. Pandora if you sleep with somebody else, I'll kill you ;)")
3	3	"Dragort: The Rusical" "DRAGORT"	19 September 2023
For this week's main challenge, the queens perform in Dragort: The Rusical (CSI: Drag - The Crime Rusical).: Kelly Heelton plays Conférenciére (Emcee); LéLé Cocoon plays Opfer (Victim); Loreley Rivers plays Pathologin (Pathologist); Metamorkid plays Kommissarin (Detective); Nikita Vegaz plays KGB Agentin (KGB Agent); Pandora Nox plays Clan Boss; Tessa Testicle plays Influencerien (Influencer); The Only Naomy plays Model; Victoria Shakespears plays Sandmännchen (Sandman); Yvonne Nightstand plays DJane; On the runway, category is Glitter Party. Kelly Heelton, Metamorkid and Victoria Shakespears receive positive critiques, with Metamorkid winning the challenge. Tessa Testicle, The Only Naomy and Yvonne Nightstand receive negative critiques, with Yvonne Nighstand being safe. Tessa Testicle and The Only Naomy lip-sync to "Holding Out for a Hero" by Bonnie Tyler. Tessa Testicle wins the lip-sync and The Only Naomy sashays away.: Guest Judge: KonstantinosTheStylist; Main Challenge: Dragort: The Rusical (CSI: Drag - The Crime Rusical); Runway Theme: Glitter Party; Challenge Winner: Metamorkid; Challenge Prize: A €1,000 cash tip; Bottom Two: Tessa Testicle and The Only Naomy; Lip-Sync Song: "Holding Out for a Hero" by Bonnie Tyler; Eliminated: The Only Naomy; Farewell Message: "Ladys, wir stehen auf den Schultern von Giganten! ♡ Bitte bleibt, wer ihr seid. XoXo The Only Naomy." ("Ladies, we stand on the shoulders of giants! ♡ Please remain who you are. XoXo The Only Naomy")
4	4	"Funny Shops" "Lustige Geschäfte"	26 September 2023
For this week's mini-challenge, the queens read each other to filth. Kelly Heelton wins the mini-challenge. For the main challenge, the queens team up and film a commercial selling an "impossible product".: Disco Ball Dentures - Kelly Heelton, Nikita Vegaz and Yvonne Nightstand; Personal Space Tent Umbrella - LéLé Cocoon, Pandora Nox and Tessa Testicle; Sausage Water Aftershave - Loreley Rivers, Metamorkid and Victoria Shakespears; On the runway, category is Night of a Thousand Angie's. Nikita Vegaz wins the main challenge, and Pandora Nox wins the runway challenge. LéLé Cocoon, Loreley Rivers and Tessa Testicle receive negative critiques, with Loreley Rivers being safe. LéLé Cocoon and Tessa Testicle lip-sync to "About Damn Time" by Lizzo. Tessa Testicle wins the lip-sync and LéLé Cocoon sashays away.: Guest Judge: Denis We; Mini-Challenge: Reading is Fundamental; Mini-Challenge Winner: Kelly Heelton; Mini-Challenge Prize: A €1,000 cash tip; Main Challenge: In teams, film a commercial selling an "impossible product"; Runway Theme: Night of a Thousand Angie's; Challenge Winner: Nikita Vegaz; Runway Winner: Pandora Nox; Bottom Two: LéLé Cocoon and Tessa Testicle; Lip-Sync Song: "About Damn Time" by Lizzo; Eliminated: LéLé Cocoon; Farewell Message: "Ladies, seid nett zu einander und zeigt der Welt, was ihr drauf habt! Ich bin kurz mit dem Manager sprechen. So geht das nicht! Dickes Bussi aus Hessen. ♡" ("Ladies, be nice to each other and show the world what you've got! I'm going to talk to the manager for a minute. That's not the way to do it! Big kiss from Hesse. ♡")
5	5	"Barbie Salesh" "Barbie Zalesh"	3 October 2023
For this week's mini-challenge, the queens team up and play "Zack Zack" (Chop Chop), in which teams will have to guess three terms in 3 minutes. Metamorkid, Loreley Rivers, Pandora Nox and Tessa Testicle win the mini-challenge. For the main challenge, the queens will improvise in a courtroom drama.: Augenbrauen-Gate (Eyebrow-Gate) - Metamorkid and Pandora Nox; Tortenschlacht (Custard Pie Battle) - Loreley Rivers and Tessa Testicle; Catfish - Nikita Vegaz and Yvonne Nightstand; Nummer vier, Ziehmutter (Foster Mother) - Kelly Heelton and Victoria Shakespears; On the runway, category is Rave Parade. Loreley Rivers, Metamorkid and Victoria Shakespears receive positive critiques, with Loreley Rivers winning the challenge. Nikita Vegaz, Pandora Nox and Tessa Testicle receive negative critiques, with Nikita Vegaz being safe. Pandora Nox and Tessa Testicle lip-sync to "Atemlos durch die Nacht" by Helene Fischer. Pandora Nox wins the lip-sync and Tessa Testicle sashays away.: Guest Judge: KonstantinosTheStylist; Mini-Challenge: In teams, play "Zack Zack" (Chop Chop); Mini-Challenge Winners: Metamorkid, Loreley Rivers, Pandora Nox and Tessa Testicle; Main Challenge: In pairs, improvise in a courtroom drama; Runway Theme: Rave Parade; Challenge Winner: Loreley Rivers; Bottom Two: Pandora Nox and Tessa Testicle; Lip-Sync Song: "Atemlos durch die Nacht" by Helene Fischer; Eliminated: Tessa Testicle; Farewell Message: "Das is mein Arsch." ("This is my ass.")
6	6	"Snatch Game - Germany Season 1" "Snatch Game at Sea"	10 October 2023
For this week's mini-challenge, the queens do a split-face photoshoot. Metamorkid and Nikita Vegaz win the mini-challenge. For the main challenge, the queens play the Snatch Game. Dianne Brill and Gianni Jovanovic star as the celebrity contestants. The cast consists of: Kelly Heelton as Bruce Darnell; Loreley Rivers as Ludwig van Beethoven; Metamorkid as Wolfgang Amadeus Mozart; Nikita Vegaz as Silvia Wollny (credited as Frau Wollny); Pandora Nox as Arnold Schwarzenegger; Victoria Shakespears as Inês Brasil; Yvonne Nightstand as Vincent Raven; On the runway, category is Dinner is Served. Kelly Heelton, Pandora Nox and Yvonne Nightstand receive positive critiques, with Kelly Heelton winning the challenge. Loreley Rivers, Nikita Vegaz and Victoria Shakespears receive negative critiques, and are announced as the bottom three. They lip-sync to "Flowers" by Miley Cyrus. Loreley Rivers and Victoria Shakespears win the lip-sync and Nikita Vegaz sashays away.: Guest Judge: Raffaela Zollo; Mini-Challenge: Split-face photoshoot; Mini-Challenge Winners: Metamorkid and Nikita Vegaz; Mini-Challenge Prize: A €1,250 cash tip courtesy of Bruno Banani; Main Challenge: Snatch Game; Runway Theme: Dinner is Served; Challenge Winner: Kelly Heelton; Challenge Prize: A €4,500 cash tip courtesy of VACAYA; Bottom Three: Loreley Rivers, Nikita Vegaz and Victoria Shakespears; Lip-Sync Song: "Flowers" by Miley Cyrus; Eliminated: Nikita Vegaz; Farewell Message: "Meine Schwestern, bleibt, wie ihr said. Ich bin nicht STINKSAUER. ICH LIEBE EUCH. 💋 Uns gehört die Welt... 💋 OHHH NE!" ("My sisters, stay as you are. I am not SICK. I LOVE YOU. 💋 We own the world.... OHHH NO!")
7	7	"Poor But Sexy" "Arm aber sexy"	17 October 2023
For this week's mini-challenge, the queens perform as rock star groupies. Metamorkid wins the mini-challenge. For the main challenge, the queens create three looks for The German Ball: Dreifache Enthüllung (Three-in-One Reveal), Future Me and Arm Aber Sexy (Poor But Sexy). On the runway, Kelly Heelton, Metamorkid and Pandora Nox receive positive critiques, with Kelly Heelton and Pandora Nox both winning the challenge. Loreley Rivers, Victoria Shakespears and Yvonne Nightstand receive negative critiques, with Yvonne Nightstand being safe. Loreley Rivers and Victoria Shakespears lip-sync to "Nobody's Supposed to Be Here (Hex Hector Dance Mix)" by Deborah Cox. Loreley Rivers wins the lip-sync and Victoria Shakespears sashays away.: Guest Judge: Estefania Elisa; Mini-Challenge: Perform as rock star groupies; Mini-Challenge Winner: Metamorkid; Mini-Challenge Prize: A €1,000 cash tip; Main Challenge: The German Ball; Runway Themes: Dreifache Enthüllung (Three-in-One Reveal), Future Me and Arm Aber Sexy (Poor But Sexy); Challenge Winners: Kelly Heelton and Pandora Nox; Bottom Two: Loreley Rivers and Victoria Shakespears; Lip-Sync Song: "Nobody's Supposed to Be Here (Hex Hector Dance Mix)" by Deborah Cox; Eliminated: Victoria Shakespears; Farewell Message: "VAGABUNDA - "Vagabunda Pop Star" my debut single OUT NOW Ich liebe euch soooooooo sehr. Beijos VS ♡" ("BITCH - "Vagabunda Pop Star" my debut single OUT NOW I love you soooooo much. Kisses VS ♡")
8	8	"Comedy Roast"	24 October 2023
For this week's mini-challenge, the queens have to convince Dianne Brill to let them into her club. Kelly Heelton and Metamorkid win the mini-challenge. For the main challenge, the queens perform a comedy roast in front of the judges. On the runway, category is A Hairy Affair. Metamorkid and Yvonne Nightstand receive positive critiques, with Yvonne Nightstand winning the challenge. Loreley Rivers and Pandora Nox receive negative critiques, and are announced as the bottom two. They lip-sync to "Chandelier" by Sia. Pandora Nox wins the lip-sync and Loreley Rivers sashays away.: Guest Judge: Estefania Elisa; Mini-Challenge: Convince Dianne Brill to let you into her club; Mini-Challenge Winners: Kelly Heelton and Metamorkid; Mini-Challenge Prize: A €500 cash tip; Main Challenge: Perform a comedy roast in front of the judges; Runway Theme: A Hairy Affair; Challenge Winner: Yvonne Nightstand; Bottom Two: Loreley Rivers and Pandora Nox; Lip-Sync Song: "Chandelier" by Sia; Eliminated: Loreley Rivers; Farewell Message: "Vergesst nie, wer ihr seid. Ihr seid STARS! Ich liebe euch, ihr blöden Tölen! 💋" ("Never forget who you are. You are STARS! I love you, you stupid clods! 💋")
9	9	"Web Show"	31 October 2023
For this week's main-challenge, the queens pair up and star in their own web show.: Wet Web Show - Kelly Heelton and Pandora Nox; Tits and Tricks - Metamorkid and Yvonne Nightstand; On the runway, category is Opera Queen. Kelly Heelton, Metamorkid, Pandora Nox and Yvonne Nightstand receive positive critiques. Metamorkid and Yvonne Nightstand are the top two queens of the week and lip-sync for the win. They lip-sync to "Rock Me Amadeus" by Falco. After the lip-sync, Metamorkid is announced as the winner of the challenge. Barbie Breakout then announces that no one is going home.: Guest Judge: Estefania Elisa; Main Challenge: In pairs, star in your own web show; Runway Theme: Opera Queen; Top Two: Metamorkid and Yvonne Nightstand; Lip-Sync Song: "Rock Me Amadeus" by Falco; Challenge Winner: Metamorkid; Challenge Prize: A €1,000 cash tip
10	10	"Dirndl Makeover" "Makeover"	7 November 2023
For this week's main challenge, the queens makeover Drag Race fans. On the runway, category is Dragtastic Dirndl Makeover. Pandora Nox and Yvonne Nightstand receive positive critiques, with Yvonne Nightstand winning the challenge. Kelly Heelton and Metamorkid receive negative critiques, and are announced as the bottom two. They lip-sync to "Heart to Break" by Kim Petras. Metamorkid wins the lip-sync and Kelly Heelton sashays away.: Guest Judge: Sasha Velour; Main Challenge: Makeover Drag Race fans; Runway Theme: Dragtastic Dirndl Makeover; Challenge Winner: Yvonne Nightstand; Challenge Prize: A €1,000 cash tip; Bottom Two: Kelly Heelton and Metamorkid; Lip-Sync Song: "Heart to Break" by Kim Petras; Eliminated: Kelly Heelton; Farewell Message:
11	11	"The Reunion - Germany Season 1" "Reunion"	14 November 2023
The queens all return for the reunion. Discussions include: Pandora Nox being the third cis woman to compete on Drag Race, Barbie Q being the first queen from Bolivia, Tessa Testicle's elimination, Victoria Shakespears' lip-syncs, Metamorkid and Yvonne Nightstand's showmance, and the eliminated queens showoff some of their unaired runways. It is then announced that Victoria Shakespears is this season's Miss Darling.: Miss Darling: Victoria Shakespears
12	12	"Grand Finale - Germany Season 1" "Finale"	21 November 2023
For the final challenge of the season, the queens perform a lip-syncing dance number to RuPaul's song "Call Me Mother". On the runway, category is Best Drag Look. The eliminated queens all return to the runway. The three finalists are told that they will be lip-syncing to "Rise Like a Phoenix" by Conchita Wurst. It is announced that Pandora Nox is the winner, leaving Metamorkid and Yvonne Nightstand as the runners-up.: Main Challenge: Perform a lip-syncing dance number to RuPaul's song "Call Me Mother"; Runway Theme: Best Drag Look; Lip-Sync Song: "Rise Like a Phoenix" by Conchita Wurst; Runners-up: Metamorkid and Yvonne Nightstand; Winner of Drag Race Germany Season One: Pandora Nox
