= Drag Race Italia season 3 =

2023 season of Drag Race Italia

Drag Race Italia
- Season 3
- Promotional poster for season three
- Hosted by: Priscilla
- Judges: Priscilla; Chiara Francini; Paola Iezzi; Paolo Camilli
- No. of contestants: 13
- Winner: Lina Galore
- Runner-up: Melissa Bianchini
- Miss Congeniality: Silvana Della Magliana
- No. of episodes: 12

Release
- Original network: MTV/Paramount+ (Italy); WOW Presents Plus (International)
- Original release: 13 October – 29 December 2023

Season chronology
- ← Previous; Season 2

The third season of Drag Race Italia premiered on 13 October 2023. The season aired on MTV in Italy and streaming platform Paramount+.

== Production ==
On 22 March 2023, casting for season three was announced via the show's official Instagram page. Applications remained open for five days, closing on 27 March. It was also confirmed that the season would air on Paramount+ instead of Discovery+ like the first two seasons, and a judging panel change was teased.

In June 2023, it was announced that Tommaso Zorzi would not return as a judge in the third season, due to a scheduling conflict with another project he was working on. The same announcement also revealed two new judges, singer and DJ Paola Iezzi, who previously appeared as a guest judge during the second season, and actor and social media personality Paolo Camilli.

On 28 August 2023, Paramount+ released a promotional post on social media, showcasing the host, Priscilla, along with the judges, Chiara Francini, Paola Iezzi, and Paolo Camilli, in a drag racing-themed set.

Thirteen contestants were announced on 18 September 2023. Paramount+ teased the season's guest judges through an Instagram post on 10 October 2023.

== Contestants ==
Ages, names, and cities stated are at time of filming.

Contestants of Drag Race Italia season 3 and their backgrounds
Contestant	Age	Hometown	Outcome
Lina Galore	34	Milan, Lombardy	Winner
Melissa Bianchini	36	Rome, Lazio	Runner-up
La Sheeva	37	Tropea, Calabria	3rd place (Note: Silvana Della Magliana was voted Miss Congeniality by fellow contestants.)
Silvana Della Magliana	44	Latina, Lazio	3rd place
Sypario	29	Caserta, Campania	5th place
Leila Yarn	24	Palermo, Sicily	6th place
La Prada	25	Milan, Lombardy	7th place
Sissy Lea	44	London, United Kingdom	8th place
Morgana Cosmica	38	Bologna, Emilia-Romagna	9th place (Note: Morgana Cosmica was voted TikTok Fan Favourite by the viewers after the show aired.)
Lightning Aurora	24	Cagliari, Sardinia	10th place
Vezirja	32	Tirana, Albania	11th place
Amy Krania	31	Brescia, Lombardy	12th place
Adriana Picasso	29	Padua, Veneto	13th place

== Contestant progress ==
Legend:

Lina Galore won Drag Race Italia season 3.
Melissa Bianchini was the runner-up.
Silvana Della Magliana was voted Miss Congeniality (Miss C) by the judges.
Morgana Cosmica was voted TikTok Fan Favourite (FF) by the viewers after the show aired.
WIN indicates that the contestant won the challenge.
SAFE indicates that the contestant was declared safe by the judges.
BTM (Bottom) indicates that the contestant was up for elimination.
ELIM (Eliminated) indicates that the contestant was eliminated.
Guest indicates that the contestant returned as a guest.

Contestants progress with placements in each episode
Contestant	Episode												
Contestant	1	2	3	4	5	6	7	8	9	10	11	12	
Lina Galore	SAFE	SAFE	SAFE	SAFE	WIN	SAFE	BTM	WIN	BTM	WIN	Guest	Winner	
Melissa Bianchini	WIN	SAFE	SAFE	SAFE	SAFE	SAFE	WIN	SAFE	SAFE	SAFE	Guest	Runner-up	
La Sheeva	SAFE	SAFE	SAFE	WIN	BTM	SAFE	SAFE	BTM	WIN	BTM	Guest	Eliminated	
Silvana Della Magliana	SAFE	WIN	SAFE	SAFE	SAFE	WIN	SAFE	SAFE	SAFE	BTM	Guest	ELIM	Miss C
Sypario	SAFE	SAFE	WIN	SAFE	SAFE	BTM	SAFE	SAFE	ELIM		Guest	Guest	
Leila Yarn	SAFE	BTM	SAFE	SAFE	SAFE	SAFE	SAFE	ELIM			Guest	Guest	
La Prada	BTM	SAFE	SAFE	SAFE	SAFE	SAFE	ELIM				Guest	Guest	
Sissy Lea	SAFE	SAFE	BTM	SAFE	SAFE	ELIM					Guest	Guest	
Morgana Cosmica	SAFE	SAFE	SAFE	BTM	ELIM						Guest	FF	
Lightning Aurora	SAFE	SAFE	SAFE	ELIM							Guest	Guest	
Vezirja	SAFE	SAFE	ELIM								Guest	Guest	
Amy Krania	SAFE	ELIM									Guest	Guest	
Adriana Picasso	ELIM										Guest	Guest	

== Lip syncs ==
Legend:

The contestant was eliminated after their first time in the bottom.
The contestant was eliminated after their second time in the bottom.
The contestant won the Lip Sync for the Crown and was declared the winner of the season.

Episode	Contestants			Song	Eliminated
1	Adriana Picasso	vs.	La Prada	"Pazzeska" (Myss Keta ft. Gué)	Adriana Picasso
2	Amy Krania	vs.	Leila Yarn	"2 Be Loved (Am I Ready)" (Lizzo)	Amy Krania
3	Sissy Lea	vs.	Vezirja	"Mare caos" (Paola & Chiara)	Vezirja
4	Lightning Aurora	vs.	Morgana Cosmica	"Tribale" (Elodie)	Lightning Aurora
5	La Sheeva	vs.	Morgana Cosmica	"Born This Way" (Lady Gaga)	Morgana Cosmica
6	Sissy Lea	vs.	Sypario	"Vamos a bailar" (Paola & Chiara, Tiziano Ferro, Gabry Ponte)	Sissy Lea
7	La Prada	vs.	Lina Galore	"Up & Down (Don't Fall in Love with Me)" (Billy More)	La Prada
8	La Sheeva	vs.	Leila Yarn	"Believe" (Cher)	Leila Yarn
9	Lina Galore	vs.	Sypario	"Mon amour" (Annalisa)	Sypario
10	La Sheeva	vs.	Silvana Della Magliana	"Siamo donne" (Sabrina Salerno, Jo Squillo)	None
Episode	Finalists			Song	Winner
12	Lina Galore	vs.	Melissa Bianchini	"Furore" (Paola & Chiara)	Lina Galore

== Guest judges ==
Listed in chronological order:

- Myss Keta, singer-songwriter and rapper
- Alessandra Mastronardi, actress
- Chiara Iezzi, singer, actress and member of musical duo Paola & Chiara
- Ciro Immobile, football player
- Jessica Melena, TV and media personality
- Rosa Chemical, rapper and model
- Tiziano Ferro, singer-songwriter and record producer
- Andreas Müller, dancer
- Veronica Peparini, choreographer and dancer
- Anna Dello Russo, editor and fashion journalist
- Filippo Timi, actor, director and writer
- Jo Squillo, singer-songwriter, TV host and activist
- Sabrina Salerno, singer-songwriter, record producer and actress
- Melissa Satta, showgirl, model and TV host

=== Special guests ===
Guests who appeared in episodes, but did not judge on the main stage.

Episode 1

- Annalisa, singer-songwriter and record producer

Episode 3

- Mommo Sacchetta, choreographer

Episode 5

- Michelle Visage, American singer, TV personality and main judge on RuPaul's Drag Race, RuPaul's Drag Race All Stars, RuPaul's Secret Celebrity Drag Race, RuPaul's Drag Race UK, RuPaul's Drag Race Down Under and RuPaul's Drag Race: UK vs the World.
- Gian Gorgeous Gucci, dancer and ballroom performer

Episode 7

- Mommo Sacchetta, choreographer

Episode 9

- Norvina, president of Anastasia Beverly Hills
- Edoardo Zaggia, TV host and media personality
- Francesco "Mehths" Cicconetti, writer, media personality and activist
- Lorenzo Balducci, actor, TV and media personality
- Papà per Scelta (Christian De Florio e Carlo Tumino), media personalities and activists

Episode 12

- Mommo Sacchetta, choreographer
- La Diamond, winner of the second season of Drag Race Italia

== Episodes ==
No. overall	No. in season	Title	Original release date
15	1	"Express Yourself"	13 October 2023
Thirteen new queens enter the workroom. For the first main challenge, the queens perform a talent show in front of the judges.: Adriana Picasso - Upside down painting; Amy Krania - Dancing; La Prada - Dancing; La Sheeva - Live singing; Leila Yarn - Burlesque; Lightning Aurora - Monologue; Lina Galore - Stand-up comedy routine; Melissa Bianchini - Lip-sync performance; Morgana Cosmica - Live singing; Silvana Della Magliana - Monologue; Sissy Lea - Live singing; Sypario - Lip-sync performance; Vezirja - Live singing; On the runway, category is Drag Excellence. Leila Yarn, Melissa Bianchini and Silvana Della Magliana receive positive critiques, with Melissa Bianchini winning the challenge. Adriana Picasso, La Prada and Sissy Lea receive negative critiques, with Sissy Lea being safe. Adriana Picasso and La Prada lip-sync to "Pazzeska" by Myss Keta ft. Gué. La Prada wins the lip-sync and Adriana Picasso is the first queen to sashay away.: Guest Judge: Myss Keta; Main Challenge: Perform a talent show in front of the judges; Runway Theme: Drag Excellence; Challenge Winner: Melissa Bianchini; Challenge Prize: A €1,000 cash tip; Bottom Two: Adriana Picasso and La Prada; Lip-Sync Song: "Pazzeska" by Myss Keta ft. Gué; Eliminated: Adriana Picasso; Farewell Message: "Non sono mica MORTA... ADRI ♡" (It's not like I'm DEAD... ADRI ♡)
16	2	"Walk of Fame" "Walk of fame"	20 October 2023
For this week's mini-challenge, the queens play a game of musical chairs. Sypario wins the mini-challenge. For the main challenge, the queens team up and act in a Grease-inspired scene called "Pink Queens".: Team Drag col vizietto (Drags with Vice): Amy Krania, La Prada, Leila Yarn, Lina Galore, Sissy Lea and Sypario; Team Queens in Love: La Sheeva, Lightning Aurora, Melissa Bianchini, Morgana Cosmica, Silvana Della Magliana and Vezirja; On the runway, category is Cinema Iconic. Team Queens in Love is the winning team, with Silvana Della Magliana winning the challenge. Team Drag col vizietto (Drags with Vice) is the losing team. Amy Krania, Leila Yarn and Sissy Lea receive negative critiques, with Sissy Lea being safe. Amy Krania and Leila Yarn lip-sync to "2 Be Loved (Am I Ready)" by Lizzo. Leila Yarn wins the lip-sync and Amy Krania sashays away.: Guest Judge: Alessandra Mastronardi; Mini-Challenge: Play a game of musical chairs; Mini-Challenge Winner: Sypario; Mini-Challenge Prize: A badge; Main Challenge: In teams, act in a Grease-inspired scene called "Pink Queens"; Runway Theme: Cinema Iconic; Challenge Winner: Silvana Della Magliana; Challenge Prize: A €1,000 cash tip; Bottom Two: Amy Krania and Leila Yarn; Lip-Sync Song: "2 Be Loved (Am I Ready)" by Lizzo; Eliminated: Amy Krania; Farewell Message: "IL MAL DI TESTA PASSA MA LA VOSTRA AMY SARÀ SEMPRE NEI VOSTRI CUORI 💋 ♡" (THE HEADACHE PASSES BUT YOUR AMY WILL ALWAYS BE IN YOUR HEARTS 💋 ♡)
17	3	"Night of a Thousand Paola and Chiaras" "Night of a thousand Paola e Chiara"	27 October 2023
For this week's main challenge, the queens perform in Paola & Chiara: Un Rusical Da Favola Non Autorizzato (Paola & Chiara: A Fabulous Unauthorized Rusical).: La Prada plays Fata Blu (Blue Fairy); La Sheeva plays Reverenda Madre Moige (Reverend Mother Moige); Leila Yarn plays Fata Rosa (Pink Fairy); Lightning Aurora plays Aiutante #1 (Sidekick #1); Lina Galore plays Mirage; Melissa Bianchini plays Paola Iezzi; Morgana Cosmica plays Aiutante #2 (Sidekick #2); Silvana Della Magliana plays Narratrice (Narrator); Sissy Lea plays Fata Verde (Green Fairy); Sypario plays Lady Glitter Ball; Vezirja plays Chiara Iezzi; On the runway, category is Viva el amor! (Long Live Love!). Melissa Bianchini, Silvana Della Magliana and Sypario receive positive critiques, with Sypario winning the challenge. Morgana Cosmica, Sissy Lea and Vezirja receive negative critiques, with Morgana Cosmica being safe. Sissy Lea and Vezirja lip-sync to "Mare caos" by Paola & Chiara. Sissy Lea wins the lip-sync and Vezirja sashays away.: Guest Judge: Chiara Iezzi; Main Challenge: Paola & Chiara: Un Rusical Da Favola Non Autorizzato (Paola & Chiara: A Fabulous Unauthorized Rusical); Runway Theme: Viva el amor! (Long Live Love!); Challenge Winner: Sypario; Challenge Prize: A €1,000 cash tip; Bottom Two: Sissy Lea and Vezirja; Lip-Sync Song: "Mare caos" by Paola & Chiara; Eliminated: Vezirja; Farewell Message: "Forever Sisters ❣ ~~Veurja~~ ~~Verizja~~ Vezirja ♡"
18	4	"The Devil Wears Drag!" "Il diavolo veste drag!"	3 November 2023
For this week's mini-challenge, the queens photobomb famous pictures. Sypario wins the mini-challenge. For the main challenge, the queens create looks made from red fabrics and materials. On the runway, category is Red Passion Week. La Sheeva, Lina Galore and Melissa Bianchini receive positive critiques, with La Sheeva winning the challenge. Lightning Aurora, Morgana Cosmica and Sypario receive negative critiques, with Sypario being safe. Lightning Aurora and Morgana Cosmica lip-sync to "Tribale" by Elodie. Morgana Cosmica wins the lip-sync and Lightning Aurora sashays away.: Guest Judges: Ciro Immobile and Jessica Melena; Mini-Challenge: Photobomb famous pictures; Mini-Challenge Winner: Sypario; Mini-Challenge Prize: A badge; Main Challenge: Create a look made from different red fabrics and materials; Runway Theme: Red Passion Week; Challenge Winner: La Sheeva; Challenge Prize: A €1,000 cash tip; Bottom Two: Lightning Aurora and Morgana Cosmica; Lip-Sync Song: "Tribale" by Elodie; Eliminated: Lightning Aurora; Farewell Message: "SOGNATE, AMATE, SIATE SEMPRE LA VOSTRA EROINA. LIGHTNING 💋 ♡" (DREAM, LOVE, ALWAYS BE YOUR HEROINE. LIGHTNING 💋 ♡)
19	5	"Back to School"	10 November 2023
For this week's mini-challenge, the queens compete in a vogue battle. Leila Yarn wins the mini-challenge. For the main challenge, the queens team up and present a drag masterclass about different subjects of drag.: Makeup - Leila Yarn, Lina Galore and Silvana Della Magliana; Tucking and Padding - Melissa Bianchini, Sissy Lea and Sypario; Fabulous Hairstyles - La Prada, La Sheeva and Morgana Cosmica; On the runway, category is Back to School. Team Makeup is the winning team, with Lina Galore winning the challenge. Team Fabulous Hairstyles is the losing team, with La Prada being safe. La Sheeva and Morgana Cosmica lip-sync to "Born This Way" by Lady Gaga. La Sheeva wins the lip-sync and Morgana Cosmica sashays away.: Guest Judge: Rosa Chemical; Mini-Challenge: Vogue battle; Mini-Challenge Winner: Leila Yarn; Mini-Challenge Prize: A badge; Main Challenge: In teams, present a drag masterclass about different subjects of drag; Runway Theme: Back to School; Challenge Winner: Lina Galore; Challenge Prize: A €1,000 cash tip; Bottom Two: La Sheeva and Morgana Cosmica; Lip-Sync Song: "Born This Way" by Lady Gaga; Eliminated: Morgana Cosmica; Farewell Message: "1 VOLTA ELIMINATA MA PER SEMPRE COSMICA! ♡" (1 TIME ELIMINATED BUT FOREVER COSMIC! ♡)
20	6	"Snatch Game - Italia Season 3" "Tutto può succedere"	17 November 2023
For this week's mini-challenge, the queens read each other to filth. Sissy Lea wins the mini-challenge. For the main challenge, the queens play the Snatch Game. Chiara Francini, Paolo Camilli and Priscilla star as the celebrity contestants. The cast consisted of: La Prada as Follettina Creation; La Sheeva as Wanna Marchi; Leila Yarn as The Head (credited as Il Testone); Lina Galore as Amanda Lear; Melissa Bianchini as Giacomo Urtis; Silvana Della Magliana as Sabrina Ferilli; Sissy Lea as Patrizia Reggiani; Sypario as Thing (credited as Mano Drag); On the runway, category is Twist. Lina Galore and Silvana Della Magliana receive positive critiques, with Silvana Della Magliana winning the challenge. La Sheeva, Sissy Lea and Sypario receive negative critiques, with La Sheeva being safe. Sissy Lea and Sypario lip-sync to "Vamos a bailar (Esta vida nueva)" by Paola & Chiara ft. Tiziano Ferro and Gabry Ponte. Sypario wins the lip-sync and Sissy Lea sashays away.: Guest Judge: Tiziano Ferro; Mini-Challenge: Reading is Fundamental; Mini-Challenge Winner: Sissy Lea; Mini-Challenge Prize: A badge; Main Challenge: Snatch Game; Runway Theme: Twist; Challenge Winner: Silvana Della Magliana; Challenge Prize: A €1,000 cash tip; Bottom Two: Sissy Lea and Sypario; Lip-Sync Song: "Vamos a bailar (Esta vida nueva)" by Paola & Chiara ft. Tiziano Ferro and Gabry Ponte; Eliminated: Sissy Lea; Farewell Message: "Miii... CHE BELLU U PESCE! VI ADORO. SEE YOU SOON. Sissy Qui ~" (Daaamn... HOW BEAUTIFUL THE FISH IS! I LOVE YOU. SEE YOU SOON. Sissy Qui ~)
21	7	"A Rhythm of Drag" "A ritmo di drag"	24 November 2023
For this week's mini-challenge, the queens play the game of Un, due, tre, drag! (One, Two, Three, Drag!). Sypario wins the mini-challenge. For the main challenge, the queens perform a choreographed dance routine in different styles.: La Prada - Viennese Waltz; La Sheeva - Swing; Leila Yarn - Sirtaki; Lina Galore - Salsa; Melissa Bianchini - Hip Hop; Silvana Della Magliana - Bachata; Sypario - Tango; On the runway, category is Shine Bright Like a Diamond. Melissa Bianchini and Sypario receive positive critiques, with Melissa Bianchini winning the challenge. La Prada, Lina Galore and Silvana Della Magliana receive negative critiques, with Silvana Della Magliana being safe. La Prada and Lina Galore lip-sync to "Up & Down (Don't Fall in Love with Me)" by Billy More. Lina Galore wins the lip-sync and La Prada sashays away.: Guest Judges: Andreas Müller and Veronica Peparini; Mini-Challenge: Play a game of Un, due, tre, drag! (One, Two, Three, Drag!); Mini-Challenge Winner: Sypario; Mini-Challenge Prize: A badge; Main Challenge: Perform a choreographed dance routine in different styles; Runway Theme: Shine Bright Like a Diamond; Challenge Winner: Melissa Bianchini; Challenge Prize: A €1,000 cash tip; Bottom Two: La Prada and Lina Galore; Lip-Sync Song: "Up & Down (Don't Fall in Love with Me) by Billy More; Eliminated: La Prada; Farewell Message: "ADRI, AMY, VEZY, AURY, MORGY, SISSY, LINA, SHEEVA, MELI, SILVY, SIPY, LEILA LOVE U ALL THE WINNER TAKES IT ALL"
22	8	"Death Drags You" "La morte ti fa drag"	1 December 2023
For this week's mini-challenge, the queens sell themselves on a dating app for widows. Lina Galore wins the mini-challenge. For the main challenge, the queens perform a roast of Chiara Francini in front of the judges and a live audience. On the runway, category is La morte ti fa Drag (Death Makes You a Drag Queen). Lina Galore, Melissa Bianchini and Silvana Della Magliana receive positive critiques, with Lina Galore winning the challenge. La Sheeva, Leila Yarn and Sypario receive negative critiques, with Sypario being safe. La Sheeva and Leila Yarn lip-sync to "Believe" by Cher. La Sheeva wins the lip-sync and Leila Yarn sashays away.: Guest Judge: Anna Dello Russo; Mini-Challenge: Sell yourself on a dating app for widows; Mini-Challenge Winner: Lina Galore; Mini-Challenge Prize: A badge; Main Challenge: Perform a roast of Chiara Francini in front of the judges and a live audience; Runway Theme: La morte ti fa Drag (Death Makes You a Drag Queen); Challenge Winner: Lina Galore; Challenge Prize: A €1,000 cash tip; Bottom Two: La Sheeva and Leila Yarn; Lip-Sync Song: "Believe" by Cher; Eliminated: Leila Yarn; Farewell Message: "Anche se non ho vinto la race ho vinto 5 sorelle a cui fare vestiti all'uncinetto! Vi amo - Leila Yarn ♡" (Even though I didn't win the race I won 5 sisters to crochet clothes to! I love you - Leila Yarn ♡)
23	9	"Social Media Queens" "Social media queens"	8 December 2023
For this week's mini-challenge, the queens do a quick drag makeup tutorial. La Sheeva wins the mini-challenge. For the main challenge, the queens makeover social media influencers. On the runway, category is Drag Topic. La Sheeva and Melissa Bianchini receive positive critiques, with La Sheeva winning the challenge. Lina Galore and Sypario receive negative critiques, and are announced as the bottom two. Lina Galore and Sypario lip-sync to "Mon amour" by Annalisa. Lina Galore wins the lip-sync and Sypario sashays away.: Guest Judge: Filippo Timi; Mini-Challenge: Quick drag makeup tutorial; Mini-Challenge Winner: La Sheeva; Mini-Challenge Prize: A badge; Main Challenge: Makeover social media influencers; Runway Theme: Drag Topic; Challenge Winner: La Sheeva; Challenge Prize: A €1,000 cash tip; Bottom Two: Lina Galore and Sypario; Lip-Sync Song: "Mon amour" by Annalisa; Eliminated: Sypario; Farewell Message: "LA VERA VITTORIA È LASCIARE UN BEL RICORDO. VI VOGLIO BENE ♡ SYPARIO" (THE REAL VICTORY IS TO LEAVE A BEAUTIFUL MEMORY. I LOVE YOU ♡ SYPARIO)
24	10	"Dragremo"	15 December 2023
For this week's mini-challenge, the queens deliver a news report. Lina Galore wins the mini-challenge. For the main challenge, the queens pair up and sing live for the Drag Remo Festival.: Lina Galore and Melissa Bianchini - "Revoluzione Solare" (Solar Revolution); La Sheeva and Silvana Della Magliana - "Come Se Non Fosse Niente" (Like It's Nothing); On the runway, category is Drag Remo Style. Lina Galore and Melissa Bianchini receive positive critiques, with Lina Galore winning the challenge. La Sheeva and Silvana Della Magliana receive negative critiques, and are announced as the bottom two. They lip-sync to "Siamo donne" by Sabrina Salerno and Jo Squillo. Both queens win the lip-sync and no one goes home.: Guest Judges: Sabrina Salerno and Jo Squillo; Mini-Challenge: Deliver a news report; Mini-Challenge Winner: Lina Galore; Mini-Challenge Prize: A badge; Main Challenge: In pairs, sing live for the Drag Remo Festival; Runway Theme: Drag Remo Style; Challenge Winner: Lina Galore; Challenge Prize: A €1,000 cash tip; Bottom Two: La Sheeva and Silvana Della Magliana; Lip-Sync Song: "Siamo donne" by Sabrina Salerno and Jo Squillo; Eliminated: None
25	11	"The Reunion - Italia Season 3" "Reunion"	22 December 2023
The queens all return for the reunion. Discussions include, La Prada's meltdown in episode 1, Lina Galore and Sypario's controversial lip-sync, the queens re-watch highlights from the season, the queens' favorite looks from the season, and the queens pick who should win the season.
26	12	"Grand Finale - Italia Season 3" "Gran Finale"	29 December 2023
For the final challenge of the season, the queens write, record and perform their own verses to Paola Iezzi's song "Queens". On the runway, the eliminated queens and the finalists present their Eleganza Extravaganza. La Sheeva and Silvana Della Magliana are eliminated, leaving Lina Galore and Melissa Bianchini as the top two queens of the season. It is revealed that Silvana Della Magliana is this season's Miss Congeniality. Lina Galore and Melissa Bianchini lip-sync to "Furore" by Paola & Chiara. It is announced that Lina Galore is the winner, leaving Melissa Bianchini as the runner-up.: Guest Judge: Melissa Satta; Main Challenge: Write, record and perform their own verses to Paola Iezzi's song "Queens"; Runway Theme: Eleganza Extravaganza; Miss Congeniality: Silvana Della Magliana; Eliminated: La Sheeva and Silvana Della Magliana; Top Two: Lina Galore and Melissa Bianchini; Lip-Sync Song: "Furore" by Paola & Chiara; Runners-up: Melissa Bianchini; Winner of Drag Race Italia Season Three: Lina Galore
