= Drag Race Italia season 2 =

2022 season of Drag Race Italia

Drag Race Italia
- Season 2
- Promotional poster for season two
- Hosted by: Priscilla
- Judges: Priscilla; Tommaso Zorzi; Chiara Francini
- No. of contestants: 10
- Winner: La Diamond
- Runners-up: Aura Eternal; Nehellenia
- Miss Congeniality: Nehellenia
- No. of episodes: 8

Release
- Original network: Discovery+ (Italy); WOW Presents Plus (International)
- Original release: 20 October – 8 December 2022

Season chronology
- ← Previous; Season 1 Next → Season 3

The second season of Drag Race Italia premiered on 20 October 2022. The ten contestants were announced on 30 September 2022. The winner of the second season of Drag Race Italia was La Diamond, with Aura Eternal and Nehellenia as runners-up.

Discovery+ confirmed that the reality show opened a casting call for season two. On 29 September 2022, they showed a teaser confirming ten contestants with Italian drag performer Priscilla, actress Chiara Francini and television personality Tommaso Zorzi reconfirmed as judges.

The season consisted of eight episodes.

== Contestants ==
Ages, names, and cities stated are at time of filming.

Contestants of Drag Race Italia season 2 and their backgrounds
Contestant	Age	Hometown	Outcome
La Diamond	35	Riesi, Sicily	Winner
Aura Eternal (Note: Now known as Aura Eternal Visage, she was referred to as Aura Eternal on the show.)	24	Palermo, Sicily	Runners-up (Note: Nehellenia was voted Miss Drag Simpatia.)
Nehellenia	31	Rome, Lazio	Runners-up
La Petite Noire	31	Palermo, Sicily	4th place
Skandalove	33	Corato, Apulia	5th place
Gioffré	25	New York City, United States	6th place
Panthera Virus	29	Florence, Tuscany	7th place
Obama (Note: Obama the Queen is referred to as Obama on the show.)	34	Rome, Lazio	8th place
Tanissa Yoncè	28	Catania, Sicily	9th place
Narciso	29	Frosinone, Lazio	10th place

== Contestant progress ==
Legend:

La Diamond won Drag Race Italia season 2.
Aura Eternal and Nehellenia were the runners-up.
Nehellenia was voted Miss Drag Simpatia (Miss DS).
WIN indicates that the contestant won the challenge.
TOP2 indicates that the contestant was one of the two best performing in the challenge, but lost the lip sync to win it.
SAFE indicates that the contestant was declared safe by the judges.
BTM (Bottom) indicates that the contestant was up for elimination.
ELIM (Eliminated) indicates that the contestant was eliminated.
Guest indicates that the contestant returned as a guest.

Contestants progress with placements in each episode
Contestant	Episode								
Contestant	1	2	3	4	5	6	7	8	
La Diamond	WIN	SAFE	WIN	WIN	SAFE	SAFE	WIN	Winner	
Aura Eternal	SAFE	WIN	SAFE	SAFE	SAFE	SAFE	SAFE	Runner-up	
Nehellenia	SAFE	SAFE	SAFE	SAFE	TOP2	WIN	SAFE	R-up	Miss DS
La Petite Noire	SAFE	SAFE	SAFE	SAFE	WIN	SAFE	BTM	Eliminated	
Skandalove	SAFE	SAFE	SAFE	SAFE	SAFE	BTM	ELIM	Guest	
Gioffré	SAFE	SAFE	SAFE	BTM	SAFE	ELIM		Guest	
Panthera Virus	BTM	SAFE	BTM	ELIM				Guest	
Obama	SAFE	BTM	ELIM					Guest	
Tanissa Yoncè	SAFE	ELIM						Guest	
Narciso	ELIM							Guest	

== Lip syncs ==
Legend:

The contestant was eliminated after their first time in the bottom.
The contestant was eliminated after their second time in the bottom.
The contestant was eliminated after their third time in the bottom.
The contestant won the lip sync to win the challenge.
The contestant won the Lip Sync for the Crown and was declared the winner of the season.

Episode	Contestants			Song	Eliminated
1	Narciso	vs.	Panthera Virus	"La bambola" (Patty Pravo)	Narciso
2	Obama	vs.	Tanissa Yoncè	"Bagno a mezzanotte" (Elodie)	Tanissa Yoncè
3	Obama	vs.	Panthera Virus	"Down Down Down" (Lollipop)	Obama
4	Gioffré	vs.	Panthera Virus	"Jem" (Cristina D'Avena)	Panthera Virus
Episode	Contestants			Song	Winner
5	La Petite Noire	vs.	Nehellenia	"The Rhythm of the Night" (Corona)	La Petite Noire
Episode	Contestants			Song	Eliminated
6	Gioffré	vs.	Skandalove	"Pem Pem" (Elettra Lamborghini)	Gioffré
7	La Petite Noire	vs.	Skandalove	"Far l'amore" (Bob Sinclar, Raffaella Carrà)	Skandalove
Episode	Final contestants			Song	Winner
8	Aura Eternal vs. La Diamond vs. Nehellenia			"Festival" (Paola & Chiara)	La Diamond

== Guest judges ==
Listed in chronological order:

- Patty Pravo, singer
- Ludovico Tersigni, actor and television host
- Nancy Brilli, actress
- Sandra Milo, actress and television personality
- Alessandra Celentano, choreographer, former dancer and television personality
- Nick Cerioni, stylist
- Vito Coppola, dancer and television personality
- Claudia Gerini, actress
- Supremme de Luxe, Spanish drag queen and singer, host of Drag Race España
- Michela Giraud, actress and comedian
- Paola Iezzi, singer, DJ, record producer and member of musical duo Paola e Chiara
- Luca Tommassini, actor and choreographer

=== Special guests ===
Guests who appeared in episodes, but did not judge on the main stage.

Episode 4

- Ava Hangar, contestant on the first season of Drag Race Italia
- Divinity, contestant on the first season of Drag Race Italia
- Elecktra Bionic, winner of the first season of Drag Race Italia
- Farida Kant, runner-up on the first season of Drag Race Italia
- Ivana Vamp, contestant on the first season of Drag Race Italia
- Le Riche, runner-up on the first season of Drag Race Italia
- Luquisha Lubamba, contestant and Miss Congeniality on the first season of Drag Race Italia

Episode 5

- Andrea Attila Felice, choreographer

Episode 7

- Michele Magani, MAC Cosmetics' global senior artist

Episode 8

- Andrea Attila Felice, choreographer
- Elecktra Bionic, winner of the first season of Drag Race Italia
- Luquisha Lubamba, contestant and Miss Congeniality on the first season of Drag Race Italia

== Episodes ==
No. overall	No. in season	Title	Original release date
7	1	"Little Italy"	20 October 2022
Ten new queens enter the workroom. For the first mini-challenge, the queens do a car wash photoshoot. Nehellenia wins the mini-challenge. For the main challenge, the queens create an Italian art inspired look made from unconventional materials. On the runway, category is Arte Italiana (Italian Art). La Diamond and Obama receive positive critiques, with La Diamond winning the challenge. Aura Eternal, Narciso and Panthera Virus receive negative critiques, with Aura Eternal being safe. Narciso and Panthera Virus lip-sync to "La bambola" by Patty Pravo. Panthera Virus wins the lip-sync and Narciso is the first queen to sashay away.: Guest Judges: Patty Pravo; Mini-Challenge: Car wash photoshoot; Mini-Challenge Winner: Nehellenia; Mini-Challenge Prize: A badge and a pair of earrings from PerLei; Main Challenge: Create an Italian art inspired look made from unconventional materials; Runway Theme: Arte Italiana (Italian Art); Challenge Winner: La Diamond; Challenge Prize: A sewing machine from Bernette; Bottom Two: Narciso and Panthera Virus; Lip-Sync Song: "La bambola" by Patty Pravo; Eliminated: Narciso; Farewell Message: "Prendetevi sempre cura di voi, perché siete sempre quello che conta. Il resto è solamente un bla bla bla che non può scomparire nel vostro make-up. Narciso" (Always take care of yourself, because you are always what matters. The rest is just a blah blah blah that cannot disappear in your make-up. Narciso)
8	2	"Colorful Drag, Lucky Drag" "Drag colorata - Drag fortunata"	27 October 2022
For this week's mini-challenge, the queens play a game called Drag Comanda Color, in which each round, Tomasso says a color. The queens will then fish out a ball of that color from a ballpit. The last queen standing will win. Nehellenia wins the mini-challenge. For the main challenge, the queens will team up and act in the soap opera "Il segreto... mica poi tanto!!".: Team Le Eternal (The Eternals): Aura Eternal, La Petite Noire, Nehellenia and Skandalove; Team Scandalose, senza Skanda (Scandalous, without Skanda): Gioffré, La Diamond, Obama, Panthera Virus and Tanissa Yoncè; On the runway, category is Prato Fiorito (Flowery Meadow). Aura Eternal and La Petite Noire receive positive critiques, with Aura Eternal winning the challenge. Gioffré, Obama and Tanissa Yoncè receive negative critiques, with Gioffré being safe. Obama and Tanissa Yoncè lip-sync to "Bagno a mezzanotte" by Elodie. Obama wins the lip-sync and Tanissa Yoncè sashays away.: Guest Judges: Ludovico Tersigni and Nancy Brilli; Mini-Challenge: Drag Comanda Color: Each round, Tommaso says a color. The queens will then fish out a ball of that color from a ballpit; Mini-Challenge Winner: Nehellenia; Mini-Challenge Prize: A badge and a necklace from PerLei; Main Challenge: In teams, act in the soap opera "Il segreto... mica poi tanto!!"; Runway Theme: Prato Fiorito (Flowery Meadow); Challenge Winner: Aura Eternal; Challenge Prize: A necklace from PerLei; Bottom Two: Obama and Tanissa Yoncè; Lip-Sync Song: "Bagno a mezzanotte" by Elodie; Eliminated: Tanissa Yoncè; Farewell Message: "Siete le mie stelle. Vi amo ♡" (You're my stars. I love you ♡)
9	3	"Snatch Game" "Snatch Game! Tutto può succedere"	3 November 2022
For this week's mini-challenge, the queens read each other to filth. Nehellenia wins the mini-challenge. For the main challenge, the queens play the Snatch Game. The cast consisted of: Aura Eternal as Pamela Prati; La Diamond as Cristiano Malgioglio; Gioffré as Pingu (credited as Pinguino); Nehellenia as Elenoire Ferruzzi; Obama as Barbara D'Urso; Panthera Virus as Asia Argento; La Petite Noire as Chiara Ferragni; Skandalove as Jill Cooper; On the runway, category is Colpo di Sce...ma (Silly, Strike, Twist!). La Diamond wins the challenge. Aura Eternal, La Petite Noire, Obama and Panthera Virus receive negative critiques, with Aura Eternal and La Petite Noire being safe. Obama and Panthera Virus lip-sync to "Down Down Down" by Lollipop. Panthera Virus wins the lip-sync and Obama sashays away.: Guest Judge: Sandra Milo; Mini-Challenge: Reading is Fundamental; Mini-Challenge Winner: Nehellenia; Mini-Challenge Prize: A badge and a travel gift card from Eden Viaggi worth €500; Main Challenge: Snatch Game; Runway Theme: Colpo di Sce...ma (Silly, Strike, Twist!); Challenge Winner: La Diamond; Challenge Prize: A travel gift card from Eden Viaggi worth €1000; Bottom Two: Obama and Panthera Virus; Lip-Sync Song: "Down Down Down" by Lollipop; Eliminated: Obama; Farewell Message: "Non smetterete mai di ridere fino a che sapete ridere di voi stesse ♡ Obama" (You will never stop laughing as long as you know how to laugh at yourself ♡ Obama)
10	4	"Daughters of the Stars" "Figlie delle stelle"	10 November 2022
For this week's mini-challenge, the queens are quizzed on horoscopes. Aura Eternal wins the mini-challenge. For the main challenge, the queens improvise as fortune tellers reading tarots to the queens from Season 1.: Aura Eternal and Luquisha Lubamba; Gioffré and Ivana Vamp; La Diamond and Farida Kant; La Petite Noire and Le Riche; Nehellenia and Divinity; Panthera Virus and Ava Hangar; Skandalove and Elecktra Bionic; On the runway, category is Drag Oroscopo (Drag Horoscope). La Diamond and Nehellenia receive positive critiques, with La Diamond winning the challenge. Gioffré and Panthera Virus receive negative critiques, and are announced as the bottom two. They lip-sync to "Jem" by Cristina D'Avena. Gioffré wins the lip-sync and Panthera Virus sashays away.: Guest Judge: Alessandra Celentano; Mini-Challenge: Horoscope quiz; Mini-Challenge Winner: Aura Eternal; Mini-Challenge Prize: A badge and a selection of products from Biofficina Toscana; Main Challenge: Improvise as fortune tellers reading tarots to the queens from Season 1; Runway Theme: Drag Oroscopo (Drag Horoscope); Challenge Winner: La Diamond; Challenge Prize: A selection of products from Biofficina Toscana; Bottom Two: Gioffré and Panthera Virus; Lip-Sync Song: "Jem" by Cristina D'Avena; Eliminated: Panthera Virus; Farewell Message: "La vincitrice non scrive allo specchio! Nella giungla comanda la Panthera. Gioffré, Diamond, Nehellenia, Petite, Aura, Skanda, VI AMO!" (The winner does not write in the mirror! Panthera rules in the jungle. Gioffré, Diamond, Nehellenia, Petite, Aura, Skanda, I LOVE YOU!)
11	5	"Festival Drag"	17 November 2022
For this week's mini-challenge, the queens play a game called Tuckis Roulant, where they have to run on a treadmill in heels while playing ring toss trying to score the most points. La Diamond wins the mini-challenge. For the main challenge, the queens perform in a rusical dedicated to Lady Gaga. On the runway, category is Dancing Queen. Aura Eternal, La Petite Noire and Nehellenia receive positive critiques. Gioffré receives negatives critiques. It is announced that La Petite Noire and Nehellenia are the top 2 queens of the week, and will lip-sync for the win. They lip-sync to "The Rhythm of the Night" by Corona. La Petite Noire is declared the winner.: Guest Judges: Nick Cerioni and Vito Coppola; Mini-Challenge: Tuckis Roulant: In high heels, run on a treadmill while playing ring toss; Mini-Challenge Winner: La Diamond; Mini-Challenge Prize: A badge and a kick scooter from Ninebot; Main Challenge: Perform in a rusical dedicated to Lady Gaga; Runway Theme: Dancing Queen; Top Two: La Petite Noire and Nehellenia; Lip-Sync Song: "The Rhythm of the Night" by Corona; Challenge Winner: La Petite Noire; Challenge Prize: A travel gift card from Eden Viaggi worth €1000
12	6	"Sporty Queens" "Una Drag nel pallone"	24 November 2022
For this week's mini-challenge, the queens have to guess the largest number of foods placed on a Pit Crewer's body by tasting them, while blindfolded. Aura Eternal wins the mini-challenge. For the main challenge, the queens give makeovers to football players from the LGBTI+ inclusive club Lupi Roma. On the runway, category is Drag nello Sport (Drag in Sport). La Petite Noire and Nehellenia receive positive critiques, with Nehellenia winning the challenge. Gioffré and Skandalove receive negative critiques, and are announced as the bottom two. They lip-sync to "Pem Pem" by Elettra Lamborghini. Skandalove wins the lip-sync and Gioffré sashays away.: Guest Judge: Claudia Gerini; Mini-Challenge: Tasting food blindfolded; Mini-Challenge Winner: Aura Eternal; Mini-Challenge Prize: A badge and an audio equipment from Brionvega; Main Challenge: Makeover football players from the LGBTI+ inclusive club Lupi Roma; Runway Theme: Drag nello Sport (Drag in Sport); Challenge Winner: Nehellenia; Challenge Prize: A professional mannequin from La Rosa; Bottom Two: Gioffré and Skandalove; Lip-Sync Song: "Pem Pem" by Elettra Lamborghini; Eliminated: Gioffré; Farewell Message: "La mente è una, le mani sono tante ♡ Gioffré ♡" (The mind is one, the hands are many ♡ Gioffré ♡)
13	7	"A Walk in Time" "A spasso nel tempo"	1 December 2022
For this week's mini-challenge, the queens paint a full face of make-up while twirling a hula hoop. Aura Eternal wins the mini-challenge. For the main challenge, the queens perform a roast of the judges and an audience of Italian sciure. On the runway, category is A Spasso nel Tempo (A Walk in Time). Aura Eternal and La Diamond receive positive critiques, with La Diamond winning the challenge. La Petite Noire and Skandalove receive negative critiques, and are announced as the bottom two. They lip-sync to "Far l'amore" by Bob Sinclar and Raffaella Carrà. La Petite Noire wins the lip-sync and Skandalove sashays away.: Guest Judge: Michela Giraud and Supremme de Luxe; Mini-Challenge: Paint a full face of make-up while twirling a hula hoop; Mini-Challenge Winner: Aura Eternal; Mini-Challenge Prize: A badge and a selection of make-up products from MAC Cosmetics; Main Challenge: Perform a roast of the judges and an audience of Italian sciure; Runway Theme: A Spasso nel Tempo (A Walk in Time); Challenge Winner: La Diamond; Challenge Prize: A travel gift card from Eden Viaggi worth €1000; Bottom Two: La Petite Noire and Skandalove; Lip-Sync Song: "Far l'amore" by Bob Sinclar and Raffaella Carrà; Eliminated: Skandalove; Farewell Message: "Qui è rinata Skandalove e qui lascio un pezzo di cuore che spero vi portiate per sempre con voi! VI AMO! SkandaLove ♡" (Here is where Skandalove was reborn, and here is where I leave a piece of my heart that I hope you will carry with you forever! I LOVE YOU! SkandaLove ♡)
14	8	"Grand Finale" "Gran Finale"	8 December 2022
For this week's mini-challenge, the queens play a game of Drag Race Italia inspired twister. La Petite Noire wins the mini-challenge. For the main challenge, the queens write, record and perform their own verses to the song "Portento (Na Na Na Na)" On the runway, the eliminated queens and the finalists present their Eleganza Extravaganza. La Petite Noire is eliminated, leaving Aura Eternal, La Diamond and Nehellenia as the top three queens of the week. It is revealed that Nehellenia is this season's Miss Drag Simpatia. Aura Eternal, La Diamond and Nehellenia lip-sync to "Festival" by Paola & Chiara. It is announced that La Diamond is the winner, leaving Aura Eternal and Nehellenia as the runners-up.: Guest Judge: Luca Tomassini and Paola Iezzi; Mini-Challenge: Play a Drag Race Italia inspired Twister; Mini-Challenge Winner: La Petite Noire; Mini-Challenge Prize: A badge and an electric scooter from ME; Main Challenge: Write, record and perform their own verses to the song "Portento (Na Na Na Na)"; Runway Theme: Eleganza Extravaganza; Miss Drag Simpatia: Nehellenia; Eliminated: La Petite Noire; Top Three: Aura Eternal, La Diamond and Nehellenia; Lip Sync Song: "Festival" by Paola & Chiara; Runners-up: Aura Eternal and Nehellenia; Winner of Drag Race Italia Season Two: La Diamond
