= Morgana Cosmica =

Italian drag queen

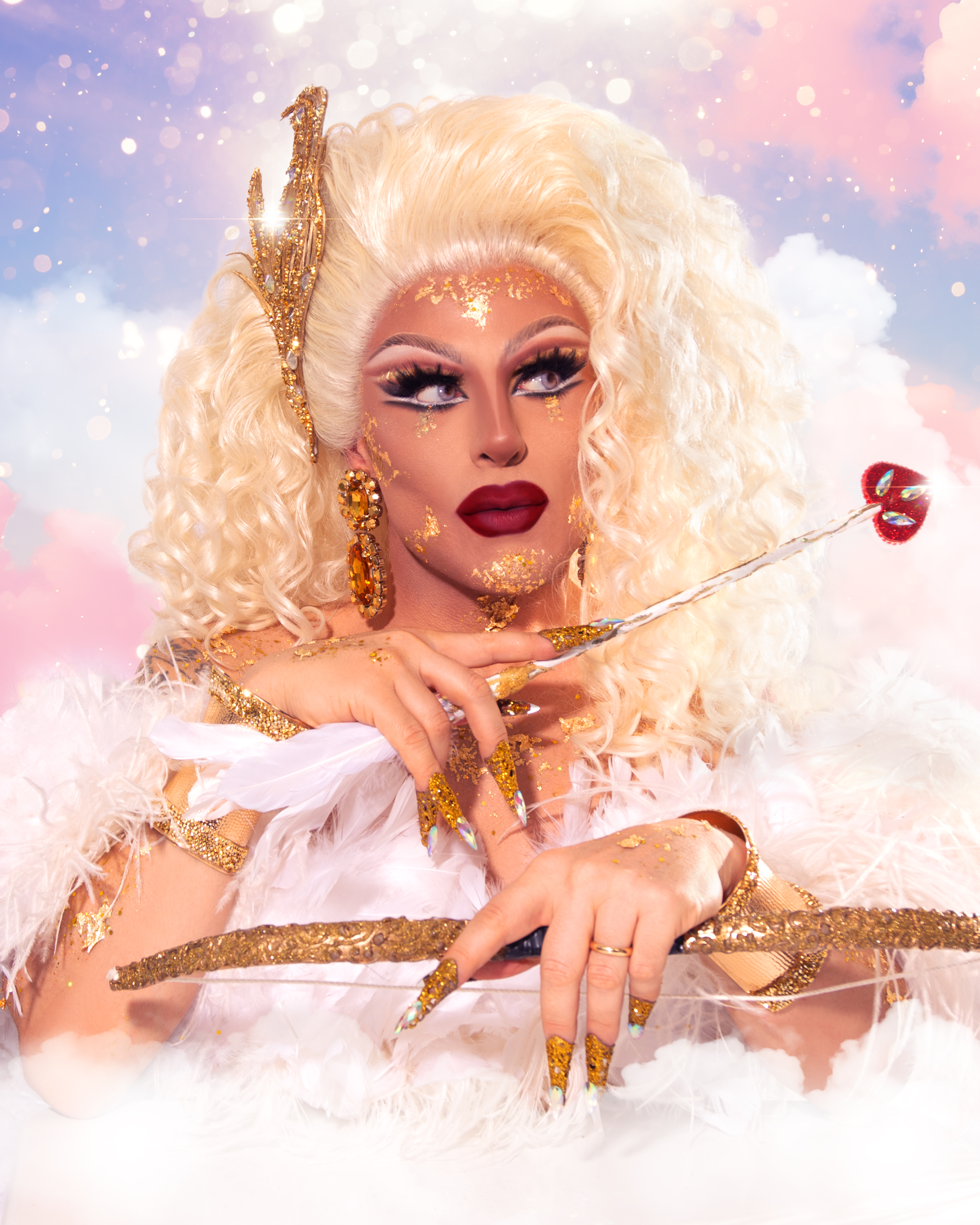
- Morgana Cosmica - Viva el Amor Look
- Born: Claudio Marseglia; 13 January 1985 (age 41); Naples, Italy
- Occupation: Drag queen
- Television: Drag Race Italia (season 3)

Claudio Marseglia (born 13 January 1985), better known by the stage name Morgana Cosmica, is an Italian drag performer, singer and author, famous for competing on the third season of Drag Race Italia.

== Biography ==
Claudio Marseglia was born in Naples on 13 January 1985. In 2009, he met his current husband, whom he married three years later in 2012. The night before the wedding, in New York, he met Bob the Drag Queen in a cabaret show, who four years later would win the eighth edition of RuPaul's Drag Race.

In 2014, Claudio and his husband Mattia participated in an episode of the television show "L'eredità" hosted by Fabrizio Frizzi on the Rai 1 channel. They were among the first and rare LGBT couples on the RAI game show. It was his husband, in 2019, who encouraged Claudio to step onto the stage and become a true professional drag queen.

=== Artistic career ===
In 2017, she won the title of Miss Alternative with a costume completely made of recyclable materials (as stated in the contest rules), and it was during this event that the name Morgana Cosmica was born. She chose Morgana as her name since she wanted the initials to be the same as her legal name Claudio Marseglia, while Cosmica was chosen by her husband after seeing her in drag for the first time.

She does not have a drag mother and everything she has learned about this world she has gained over the years through study and practice. In 2019, Morgana participated in the regional selection of the "Drag Factor" competition and came in first place. She became drag resident at the LGBTQIA+ friendly club "Red" in Bologna, Emilia-Romagna.

She competed on season 3 of Drag Race Italia, which aired in 2023 on Paramount+ and was voted Fan Favourite (FF) by the viewers after the show aired.

In November 2023, during the airing of the third season of Drag Race Italia, she joined the Werq the World Tour, on the Milan date, along with her sisters from her season (plus Elecktra Bionic and La Diamond) and international drag stars such as Kandy Muse, Aquaria, Bosco, Mistress Isabelle Brooks, Lady Camden and Daya Betty

She attended the first edition of DragCon Brazil in June 2026, serving as the only representative from Drag Race Italia. During the event, she walked the Pink Carpet runway in an outfit freely inspired by Tom of Finland's iconic artwork.

== Filmography ==
=== Television ===
Year	Title	Role	Season	Notes
2014	L'eredità	Himself	13	Contestant
2023	Drag Race Italia	Herself	3	Contestant

== Discography ==
=== Singles ===
Year	Title	Notes
2023	"I can live without you"	
2023	"Senza te"	
2025	"Élite"	
2025	"Donna Hot"	ft. Vezirja
2026	"Macho Alfa"	
2026	"Dame un beso (Adiòs)"	

== Published Works ==
- Cosmica, Morgana (2026). Love at the Williams Court - Quando meno te l'aspetti (in Italian). Albatros il filo. ISBN 9791223620717.
