= La Diamond =

Italian drag queen and costume designer (born 1987)

- Born: Enrico La Rocca; May 6, 1987 (age 39); Riesi, Sicily, Italy
- Occupations: Drag queen; costume designer
- Years active: 2011–present
- Known for: Winning Drag Race Italia
- Predecessor: Elecktra Bionic

Enrico La Rocca (born May 6, 1987), known professionally as La Diamond, is an Italian drag queen and costume designer originally from Riesi, Sicily. Described as one of the most known and appreciated drag queens in Italy by the Out magazine, she (Note: This article uses both He and She pronouns.) started doing drag in Rome, 2011. La Diamond rose to mainstream prominence by winning the second season of Drag Race Italia in 2022.

== Life and career ==
La Rocca was born on May 6, 1987, and raised in the Riesi municipality, Province of Caltanissetta of Sicily. He has shown interest in fashion from an early age being influenced by his grandmother and mother, who worked as stylists in a family run atelier. He moved to Rome to attend academy of fashion and later worked as a designer for Valentino.

In 2011, La Rocca began doing drag as La Diamond in Rome's gay bar Muccassassina, where he still holds residency. He cited designers such as Alexander McQueen, John Galliano and Thierry Mugler, alongside performers like Marilyn Monroe, Dita Von Teese, Amanda Lepore and Grace Jones as his stylistic influences. She described fellow-Drag Race contestants Farida Kant, Le Riche, Nehellenia and Aura Eternal as her "drag family". In 2018, La Diamond won the title of Miss Drag Queen Lazio.

La Rocca stated that he shot several scenes for the 2021 House of Gucci with Lady Gaga, which were eventually cut out from the movie, but can still be seen in the official trailer.

On 30 September 2022, she was announced as a contestant on the second season of Drag Race Italia. As a part of the show's promotion, La Diamond alongside other nine contestants was featured on the cover of Italian Vanity Fair magazine. During the competition, she won four out of seven main challenges, which included: design, Snatch Game, improv and roast challenges. During the grand finale, which aired on December 8, La Diamond was declared the winner, receiving the title of Italia's Next Drag Superstar and a one-year contract with MAC Cosmetics as their brand ambassador.

== Filmography ==
Television
Year	Title	Role	Notes
2022	Drag Race Italia	Herself	Season 2, Contestant (Winner)
2024	Bring Back My Girls	Herself	Episode: "Drag Race Italia Season 2"

== Discography ==
Title	Year
"Portento (Na Na Na Na)" (as the girl group 4Tune (Note: The queens on this track from the cast include Aura Eternal, La Diamond, La Petit Noire and Nehellenia.))	2022

== Awards and nominations ==
Year	Award	Category	Nominee/work	Result	Ref.
Magnifica Awards Roma	2022	Revelation of the Year	"Portento" (4Tune)	Won	
