= Paola & Chiara discography =

- Studio albums: 8
- Extended plays: 7
- Compilation albums: 3
- Singles: 36
- Video albums: 1
- Music videos: 29

This is the complete discography of Italian pop duo Paola & Chiara including albums, singles, videos and DVDs.

== Albums ==
=== Studio albums ===
Year	Album	Peak chart positions		Certifications
Year	Album	ITA	SWI	Certifications
1997	Ci chiamano bambine: Debut studio album; Released: February 2, 1997; Label: Columbia Records	33		Platinum ITA + 150.000
1998	Giornata storica: Second studio album; Released: October 29, 1998; Label: Columbia Records	-	-	
2000	Television: Third studio album; Released: June 19, 2000; Label: Columbia Records	23	32	Platinum ITA + 150.000
2002	Festival: Fourth studio album; Released: June 24, 2002; Label: Columbia Records	13	50	
2004	Blu: Fifth studio album; Released: May 10, 2004; Label: Columbia Records	27	56	
2007	Win the Game: Sixth studio album; Released: November 16, 2007; Label: Trepertre srl	40	-	
2010	Milleluci: Seventh studio album; Released: November 9, 2010; Label: Trepertre srl - Carosello Records	19	-	
2013	Giungla: Eight studio album; Released: June 11, 2013; Label: Trepertre, Self, Pirames International	-	-	

=== EPs ===
- 2005: Fatalità
- 2005: A modo mio
- 2007: Second Life
- 2009: Emozioni
- 2010: Pioggia d'estate
- 2013: Divertiamoci (perché c'è feeling)
- 2023: Furore Pack

=== Compilations ===
Year	Album	Peak chart positions	Certifications
Year	Album	ITA	Certifications
2005	Greatest Hits: Hits Compilation; Released: February 24, 2005; Label: Columbia Records	25	Gold ITA + 40,000
2015	The Story: Hits Compilation; Released: July 28, 2015; Label: Smilax Records		
2023	Per sempre: Duets Compilation; Released: May 12, 2023; Label: Columbia Records	3	

== Singles ==
Year	Single	Chart positions							Album
Year	Single	ITA	SWI	GER	SWE	NOR	EUR	NL	Album
1997	"Amici come prima"	—	—	—	—	—	—	—	Ci chiamano bambine
1997	"Amore mio"	—	—	—	—	—	—	—	Ci chiamano bambine
1997	"Ti vada o no"	—	—	—	—	—	—	—	Ci chiamano bambine
1998	"Per te"	—	—	—	—	—	—	—	Ci chiamano bambine
1998	"Colpo di fulmine"	—	—	—	—	—	—	—	Giornata storica
1998	"Non puoi dire di no"	—	—	—	—	—	—	—	Giornata storica
1998	"Nina"	—	—	—	—	—	—	—	Giornata storica
2000	"Vamos a bailar (esta vida nueva)"	1	13	29	32	18	—	95	Television
2000	"Amoremidai"	22	69	—	—	—	—	—	Television
2000	"Viva el amor!"	8	63	74	—	—	—	—	Television
2001	"Fino alla fine"	22	100	—	—	—	—	—	Television
2002	"Festival"	6	91	—	—	—	—	—	Festival
2002	"Hey!"	21	—	—	—	—	—	—	Festival
2003	"Kamasutra"	19	—	—	—	—	—	—	Festival
2004	"Blu"	18	—	—	—	—	—	—	Blu
2005	"A modo mio"	10	—	—	—	—	43	—	Greatest Hits
2005	"Fatalità"	29	—	—	—	—	—	—	Greatest Hits
2007	"Second Life"	4	—	—	—	—	46	—	Win the Game
2007	"Cambiare pagina" / “I’ll Be Over You (Turn the Page)”	7	—	—	—	—	57	—	Win the Game
2008	"Vanity & Pride"	21	—	—	—	—	—	—	Win the Game
2009	"Emozioni" / “Can You Feel It (Mi Corazon)”	—	—	—	—	—	—	—	Non-album single
2010	"Pioggia d'estate"	26	—	—	—	—	—	—	Milleluci
2010	"Milleluci"	—	—	—	—	—	—	—	Milleluci
2013	"Divertiamoci (perchè c'è feeling)"	—	—	—	—	—	—	—	Giungla
2023	"Furore"	12	—	—	—	—	—	—	Per sempre
2023	"Mare caos"	70	—	—	—	—	—	—	Per sempre
2023	"Vamos a bailar" (feat. Tiziano Ferro)	—	—	—	—	—	—	—	Per sempre
2023	"Solo mai"	—	—	—	—	—	—	—	Non-album singles
2024	"Festa totale"	—	—	—	—	—	—	—	Non-album singles
2024	"Il linguaggio del corpo" (feat. BigMama)	—	—	—	—	—	—	—	Non-album singles

== DVDs ==
Year	Title	Peak chart positions	Certifications
Year	Title	ITA	Certifications
2005	Paola e Chiara The Video Collection: 1997-2005: Music Video Collection; Released: February 24, 2005; Label: Columbia Records	5	

== Music videos ==
Year	Song title	Album	Director
1997	"Ci chiamano bambine"	Ci chiamano bambine	Stefano Moro
1997	"Ti vada o no"	Ci chiamano bambine	-
1998	"Per Te"	Ci chiamano bambine	Luca Merli
1998	"Non puoi dire di no"	Giornata storica	Stefano Moro
2000	"Vamos a bailar (esta vida nueva)" (Italian Version)	Television	Luca Guadagnino
2000	"Vamos a bailar (esta vida nueva)" (Spanish Version)	Television	Stefano Moro
2000	"Vamos a bailar (esta vida nueva)" (English Version)	Television	Stefano Moro
2000	"Amoremidai"	Television	Alberto Colombo
2000	"Amoremidai/You Give Me Love" (English Version)	Television	Alberto Colombo
2001	"Viva el amor!"	Television	Alberto Colombo
2001	"Viva el amor!" (Spanish Version)	Television	
2001	"Viva el amor!" (English Version)	Television	
2001	"Fino alla fine"	Television	Riccardo Paoletti
2002	"Festival"	Festival	Alberto Colombo
2002	"Noche magica" (Spanish Version of Festival)	Festival	Alberto Colombo
2002	"Heart Beatin" (English Version of Festival)	Festival	Alberto Colombo
2002	"Hey!"	Festival	Luca Tommassini
2003	"Kamasutra"	Festival	Tommaso Pellicci
2004	"Blu"	Blu	Tommaso Pellicci
2005	"A modo mio"	Greatest Hits	
2005	"Fatalità"	Greatest Hits	Tommaso Pellicci
2007	"Second Life"	Win the Game	Rodolfo Crisafulli
2007	"Second Life" (Montanari Remix)	Win the Game	Rodolfo Crisafulli
2007	"Cambiare pagina"	Win the Game	Einar Snorri
2007	”I'll Be Over You (Turn the Page)” (English Version of Cambiare Pagina)	Win the Game	Einar Snorri
2008	"Vanity&Pride"	Win the Game	Simone Falcetta
2010	"Pioggia d'Estate"	Milleluci	Gaetano Morbioli
2011	"Milleluci"	Milleluci	Cosimo Alemà
2023	"Furore"	Per Sempre	Paolo Santambrogio
2023	"Mare caos"	Per Sempre	Paolo Santambrogio
2023	"Lambada" (with Boomdabash)	Non-album single	Fabrizio Conte
2023	"Solo mai"	Non-album single	Paolo Santambrogio
