= Obama (drag queen) =

Italian drag performer

- Born: Baye Dame Dia
- Occupation: Drag queen
- Television: Drag Race Italia (season 2)

Obama is the stage name of Baye Dame Dia, an Italian drag performer who has competed on the Italian version of Big Brother season 15 as well as season 2 of Drag Race Italia.

== Career ==
Early in her drag career (2000s), Obama was known as Naomo. Out of drag, Obama competed on Big Brother in 2018. She competed as Obama on the second season of Drag Race Italia. She impersonated Barbara D'Urso for the Snatch Game challenge.

== Personal life ==
Obama is of Senegalese ancestry and is based in Rome. Her name pays tribute to former U.S. president Barack Obama. She is inspired by Naomi Campbell and Grace Jones.

== Filmography ==
=== Television ===
- Big Brother (2018)
- Drag Race Italia (season 2)
