= Drag Race Italia season 1 =

2021 season of Drag Race Italia

Drag Race Italia
- Season 1
- Promotional poster for season one
- Hosted by: Priscilla
- Judges: Priscilla; Tommaso Zorzi; Chiara Francini
- No. of contestants: 8
- Winner: Elecktra Bionic
- Runners-up: Farida Kant; Le Riche
- Miss Congeniality: Luquisha Lubamba
- No. of episodes: 6

Release
- Original network: Discovery+ (Italy); WOW Presents Plus (International)
- Original release: 18 November – 23 December 2021

Season chronology
- Next → Season 2

The first season of Drag Race Italia premiered on November 18, 2021. The cast was announced on October 28, 2021. The winner of the first season of Drag Race Italia was Elecktra Bionic, becoming the first ever winner in the Drag Race franchise without any maxi-challenge wins, and the first contestant to never lip sync or win a maxi-challenge in the same season, with Farida Kant and Le Riche as runners-up.

Casting occurred in early 2021 with production starting in summer 2021. On June 30, 2021, it was announced that the judges panel will include Italian drag performer Priscilla, actress Chiara Francini and television personality Tommaso Zorzi.

The season consisted of six episodes.

== Contestants ==
Ages, names, and cities stated are at time of filming.

Contestants of Drag Race Italia season 1 and their backgrounds
Contestant	Age	Hometown	Outcome
Elecktra Bionic	27	Turin, Piedmont	Winner
Farida Kant	33	Lecce, Apulia	Runners-up
Le Riche	35	Palermo, Sicily	Runners-up
Luquisha Lubamba	33	Bologna, Emilia-Romagna	4th place (Note: Luquisha Lubamba was voted Miss Drag Simpatia.)
Ava Hangar	36	Carbonia, Sardinia	5th place
Divinity	27	Naples, Campania	6th place
Enorma Jean	46	Milan, Lombardy	Disqualified (Note: Enorma Jean was disqualified from the competition after losing a lip sync against Ava Hangar. Both queens were declared up for elimination due to swearing and insulting production backstage.)
Ivana Vamp	32	Arezzo, Tuscany	8th place

== Contestant progress ==
Legend:

Elecktra Bionic won Drag Race Italia season 1.
Farida Kant and Le Riche were the runners-up.
Luquisha Lubamba was voted Miss Drag Simpatia (Miss DS).
WIN indicates that the contestant won the challenge.
SAFE indicates that the contestant was declared safe by the judges.
BTM (Bottom) indicates that the contestant was up for elimination.
ELIM (Eliminated) indicates that the contestant was eliminated.
DISQ (Disqualified) Enorma Jean was disqualified for breaking the rules.
Guest indicates that the contestant returned as a guest.

Contestants progress with placements in each episode
Contestant	Episode						
Contestant	1	2	3	4	5	6	
Elecktra Bionic	SAFE	SAFE	SAFE	SAFE	SAFE	Winner	
Farida Kant	WIN	SAFE	SAFE	SAFE	WIN	Runner-up	
Le Riche	SAFE	BTM	BTM	WIN	SAFE	Runner-up	
Luquisha Lubamba	BTM	SAFE	SAFE	SAFE	BTM	ELIM	Miss DS
Ava Hangar	SAFE	SAFE	BTM	BTM	ELIM	Guest	
Divinity	BTM	SAFE	WIN	ELIM		Guest	
Enorma Jean	SAFE	WIN	SAFE	DISQ		Guest	
Ivana Vamp	SAFE	ELIM				Guest	

== Lip syncs ==
Legend:

The contestant was eliminated after their first time in the bottom.
The contestant was eliminated after their second time in the bottom.
The contestant was eliminated after their third time in the bottom.
The contestant was disqualified after losing the lip sync to stay in the competition.
The contestant won the Lip Sync for the Crown and was declared the winner of the season.

Episode	Contestants			Song	Eliminated
1	Divinity	vs.	Luquisha Lubamba	"Occhi di gatto" (Cristina D'Avena)	None
2	Ivana Vamp	vs.	Le Riche	"Comprami" (Viola Valentino)	Ivana Vamp
3	Ava Hangar	vs.	Le Riche	"Fiesta (Spanish version)" (Raffaella Carrà)	None
4	Ava Hangar	vs.	Enorma Jean	"Champion" (RuPaul)	Enorma Jean
4	Ava Hangar	vs.	Divinity	"Kobra" (Donatella Rettore)	Divinity
5	Ava Hangar	vs.	Luquisha Lubamba	"Cicale" (Heather Parisi)	Ava Hangar
Episode	Final contestants			Song	Winner
6	Elecktra Bionic vs. Farida Kant vs. Le Riche			"Non sono una signora" (Loredana Bertè)	Elecktra Bionic

== Guest judges ==
Listed in chronological order:

- Cristina D'Avena, singer and actress
- Fabio Mollo, film director
- Gianmarco Saurino, actor
- Vladimir Luxuria, activist, television personality and actress
- Nick Cerioni, stylist
- Donatella Rettore, singer
- Giancarlo Commare, actor
- Enzo Miccio, stylist and wedding planner
- Coco Rebecca Edogamhe, actress
- Ambra Angiolini, singer and actress

=== Special guests ===
Guests who appeared in episodes, but did not judge on the main stage.

Episode 3

- Tiziano Ferro, singer and songwriter
- Andrea Attila Felice, choreographer
- Stefano Magnanelli, songwriter

Episode 4

- Michele Magani, MAC Cosmetics' global senior artist
- Vincenzo De Lucia, comedian and impersonator

Episode 6

- Andrea Attila Felice, choreographer
- Tommaso Stanzani, dancer
- RuPaul, American drag queen and RuPaul's Drag Race host
- Michelle Visage, American singer, television personality and RuPaul's Drag Race judge

== Episodes ==
No. overall	No. in season	Title	Original release date
1	1	"Ciao Italia" "Ciao Italia!"	18 November 2021
Eight drag queens enter the workroom. For the first mini-challenge, the queens do a photoshoot on a Venetian Gondola. Elecktra Bionic wins the mini-challenge. For the main challenge, the queens create an Italian Style look out of materials inside old suitcases.: Ava Hangar - Nonna Silvana (Grandma Silvana); Divinity - Nonna Anna (Grandma Anna); Elecktra Bionic - Nonna Sofia (Grandma Sofia); Enorma Jean - Nonna Claudia (Grandma Claudia); Farida Kand - Nonna Gina (Grandma Gina); Ivana Vamp - Nonna Virna (Grandma Virna); Le Riche - Nonna Monica (Grandma Monica); Luquisha Lubamba - Nonna Alida (Grandma Alida); On the runway, category is Italian Style. Ivana Vamp and Farida Kant receive positive critiques, with Farida Kant winning the challenge. Divinity and Luquisha Lubamba receive negative critiques, and are announced as the bottom two. They lip-sync to "Occhi di gatto" by Cristina D'Avena. They are both declared the winners of the lip-sync and no one goes home.: Guest Judge: Cristina D'Avena; Mini-Challenge: Photoshoot on a Venetian Gondola; Mini-Challenge Winner: Elecktra Bionic; Mini-Challenge Prize: A jewelry piece by Aster Lab; Main Challenge: Create an Italian Style look out of materials inside old suitcases; Runway Theme: Italian Style; Challenge Winner: Farida Kant; Bottom Two: Divinity and Luquisha Lubamba; Lip-Sync Song: "Occhi di gatto" by Cristina D'Avena; Eliminated: None
2	2	"Divas" "Grandi Dive"	26 November 2021
For this week's mini-challenge, the queens compete in a limbo extravaganza. Ava Hangar wins the mini-challenge. For the main challenge, the queens create their own infomercial about a specific item.: Ava Hangar - Handset; Divinity - Magic Wand; Elecktra Bionic - Pills; Enorma Jean - Nothing; Farida Kant - Canvas, brush and paint; Ivana Vamp - Decanter; Le Riche - App; Luquisha Lubamba - Megaphone; On the runway, category is Grandi Dive (Great Divas). Enorma Jean wins the challenge. Ivana Vamp, Le Riche and Luquisha Lubamba receive negative critiques, with Luquisha Lubamba being safe. Ivana Vamp and Le Riche lip-sync to "Comprami" by Viola Valentino. Le Riche wins the lip-sync and Ivana Vamp is the first queen to sashay away.: Guest Judges: Fabio Mollo and Gianmarco Saurino; Mini-Challenge: Limbo Extravaganza; Mini-Challenge Winner: Ava Hangar; Mini-Challenge Prize: A jewelry piece by Aster Lab; Main Challenge: Create your own infomercial about a specific item; Runway Theme: Grandi Dive (Great Divas); Challenge Winner: Enorma Jean; Bottom Two: Ivana Vamp and Le Riche; Lip-Sync Song: "Comprami" by Viola Valentino; Eliminated: Ivana Vamp; Farewell Message: "Ricordatevi sempre che siamo le prime in Tutto! Ps. Porca mattina! Vs Ivana Vamp" ("Always remember that we're the first ones in Everything! Ps. Good Fucking Morning! Vs Ivana Vamp")
3	3	"Night of a Thousand Raffaella Carràs" "Raffaella, una di noi"	3 December 2021
For this week's mini-challenge, the queens have to complete a puzzle of an iconic Raffaella Carrà look. Elecktra Bionic wins the mini-challenge. For the main challenge, the queens perform in Raffaella Carrà: The Rusical. On the runway, category is Che Carrà Se? (Which Carrà Are You?). Divinity and Luquisha Lubamba receive positive critiques, with Divinity winning the challenge. Ava Hangar and Le Riche receive negative critiques, and are announced as the bottom two. They lip-sync to "Fiesta (Spanish Version)" by Raffaella Carrà. They are both declared the winners of the lip-sync and no one goes home.: Guest Judges: Vladimir Luxuria and Nick Cerioni; Mini-Challenge: Complete a puzzle of an iconic Raffaella Carrà look; Mini-Challenge Winner: Elecktra Bionic; Mini-Challenge Prize: A jewelry piece by Aster Lab; Main Challenge: Raffaella Carrà: The Rusical; Runway Theme: Che Carrà Se? (Which Carrà Are You?); Challenge Winner: Divinity; Bottom Two: Ava Hangar and Le Riche; Lip-Sync Song: "Fiesta (Spanish Version)" by Raffaella Carrà; Eliminated: None
4	4	"Snatch Game & Fab 80's" "Snatch Game! Tutto può succedere"	7 December 2021
For this week's mini-challenge, the queens have to apply drag makeup in the dark. Elecktra Bionic wins the mini-challenge. For the main challenge, the queens play the Snatch Game. The cast consisted of: Ava Hangar as Alice and Ellen Kessler; Divinity as Belén Rodríguez; Elecktra Bionic as Francesca Cipriani; Enorma Jean as Rita Levi-Montalcini; Farida Kant as Alessandra Celentano; Le Riche as Valeria Marini; Luquisha Lubamba as Elettra Lamborghini; Before the runway starts, Ava Hangar and Enorma Jean are called to the main stage. On the main stage, Priscilla tells them that she is extremely disappointed in their actions last week in untucked. She tells them that they will be lip-syncing as a punishment. The queen who doesn't win the lip-sync, will be immediately removed from the competition. They lip-sync to "Champion" by RuPaul. Ava Hangar wins the lip-sync and remains in the competition. Enorma Jean is then disqualified from the competition. The remaining queens then walk the runway with category being I Favolosi Anni 80 (The Fabulous 80’s). Le Riche and Luquisha Lubamba receive positive critiques, with Le Riche winning the challenge. Ava Hangar and Divinity receive negative critiques, and are announced as the bottom two. They lip-sync to "Kobra" by Donatella Rettore. Ava Hangar wins the lip-sync and Divinity sashays away.: Guest Judges: Donatella Rettore and Giancarlo Commare; Mini-Challenge: Apply drag makeup in the dark; Mini-Challenge Winner: Elecktra Bionic; Mini-Challenge Prize: A selection of products from Mac Cosmetics worth €500; Main Challenge: Snatch Game; Queens Facing Disqualification: Enorma Jean and Ava Hangar; Lip-Sync Song: "Champion" by RuPaul; Disqualified: Enorma Jean; Farewell Message: "La drag è un'artista con le palle. Le mie non sono grandi, sono ENORMI" ("A drag queen is an artist who has balls. Mine are not big, they are ENORMOUS"); Runway Theme: I Favolosi Anni 80 (The Fabulous 80’s); Challenge Winner: Le Riche; Challenge Prize: A selection of products from Mac Cosmetics worth €750; Bottom Two: Ava Hangar and Divinity; Lip-Sync Song: "Kobra" by Donatella Rettore; Eliminated: Divinity; Farewell Message: "Colorate il mondo con la vostra arte xoxo Divinity" ("Color the world with your art xoxo Divinity")
5	5	"Long Live the Drag Bride" "Il giorno più bello"	17 December 2021
For this week's mini-challenge, the queens have to find words with the letters given, written on the pants of the pit crew. Ava Hangar wins the mini-challenge. For the main challenge, the queens makeover one of their loved ones as their best woman, with the queens being the bride. On the runway, category is Viva La Sposa! (Long Live the Bride!) Elecktra Bionic, Farida Kant and Le Riche receive positive critiques, with Farida Kant winning the challenge. Ava Hangar and Luquisha Lubamba receive negative critiques and are announced as the bottom two. They lip-sync to "Cicale" by Heather Parisi. Luquisha Lubamba wins the lip-sync and Ava Hangar sashays away.: Guest Judges: Coco Rebecca Edogamhe and Enzo Miccio; Mini-Challenge: Find words with the letters given, written on the pants of the pit crew; Mini-Challenge Winner: Ava Hangar; Mini-Challenge Prize: A jewelry piece by Aster Lab; Main Challenge: Makeover one of your loved ones as your best woman and yourself as the bride; Runway Theme: Viva La Sposa! (Long Live the Bride!); Challenge Winner: Farida Kant; Challenge Prize: A jewelry piece by Aster Lab; Bottom Two: Ava Hangar and Luquisha Lubamba; Lip-Sync Song: "Cicale" by Heather Parisi; Eliminated: Ava Hangar; Farewell Message: "Continuate a fare la storia, fuori ci aspetta un mondo bellissimo. Love Ava" "(Keep making history, a beautiful world awaits us outside. Love Ava)"
6	6	"Grand Finale" "Gran Finale"	23 December 2021
For this week's mini-challenge, the queens read each other to filth. Elecktra Bionic wins the mini-challenge. For the main challenge, the queens write, record and perform their own verses to RuPaul's song "A Little Bit of Love". On the runway, the eliminated queens and the finalists present their Eleganza Extravaganza. It is revealed that Luquisha Lubamba is this season's Miss Drag Simpatia. Luquisha Lubamba is then subsequently eliminated, leaving Elecktra Bionic, Farida Kant and Le Riche as the final three. They lip-sync to "Non sono una signora" by Loredana Bertè. It is announced that Elecktra Bionic is the winner, leaving Farida Kant and Le Riche as the runners-up.: Guest Judge: Ambra Angiolini; Mini-Challenge: Reading Is Fundamental; Mini-Challenge Winner: Elecktra Bionic; Main Challenge: Write, record and perform their own verses to RuPaul's song "A Little Bit of Love"; Runway Theme: Eleganza Extravaganza; Miss Drag Simpatia: Luquisha Lubamba; Eliminated: Luquisha Lubamba; Top Three: Elecktra Bionic, Farida Kant and Le Riche; Lip-Sync Song: "Non sono una signora" by Loredana Bertè; Runners-up: Farida Kant and Le Riche; Winner of Drag Race Italia Season One: Elecktra Bionic
