= Chiara Iezzi =

Italian actress, singer and musician (born 1973)

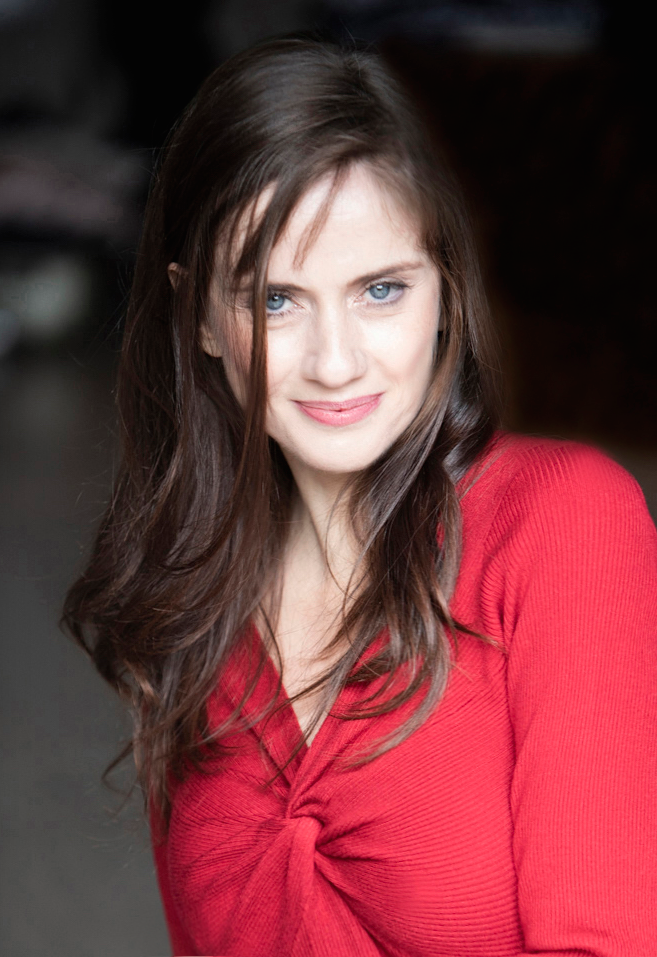
- Chiara Iezzi in 2018

Background information
- Born: 27 February 1973 (age 52); Milan, Italy
- Genres: Pop; dance
- Occupations: Singer; actress
- Years active: 1996–present

Chiara Teresa Iezzi (27 February 1973) is an Italian singer, songwriter, and actress. She was part of the duo Paola & Chiara until 2013, when she decided to dedicate herself to acting. She returned to singing in 2022 with her sister, Paola.

== Career ==
=== Singer ===
After her debut in jazz and funk bands, in 1996 she started the duo Paola & Chiara with Paola Iezzi signing a contract with Sony Music Italy. The duo took part to the Sanremo Music Festival event 4 times (1997, 1998, 2005 and 2023).

In 2000 they released the single Vamos a bailar (Esta vida nueva) winning the platinum record and obtaining an international success with the album Television.

In 2007 Iezzi released her first EP as a solo singer, Nothing at All; it was one of the top-selling singles in Italy in 2007. The official video was filmed in London by Maki Gherzi. In 2013 she released the Ep L'Universo.

In December 2013 she released a cover of the song Hallelujah by Leonard Cohen.

In 2015 she took part as contestant to the third edition of The Voice of Italy.

In 2022 she rejoined her sister Paola and returned back to music recostituing the pop duo Paola & Chiara. In December 2022 the duo announced to be participating in the 2023 Festival of Sanremo with a comeback single titled "Furore". The single gained much public acclaim and soon became a platinum hit and a TikTok trend.

In the summer 2023 the duo published the single "Mare Caos", gaining the gold certification, and a greatest hits album titled "Per Sempre" revisiting their best hits featured many italian music personalities. The duo took part to the Boomdabash's summer single "Lambada" also. In December 2023 the duo published the single "Solo Mai".

=== Actress ===
Iezzi has been fascinated in acting since adolescence. She started to attend an acting school in her spare time while she was graduating as a fashion designer. She took part in some video clips and when she was 22 a director invited her in a casting in Rome.

In 2010 she collaborated to the soundtrack "Maledimiele", a movie directed by Marco Pozzi, singing the main theme L'altra parte di me ("The Other Side of Me"). The song won the Roma Videoclip award.

In 2011 she began to study acting seriously.

In 2014 she got into the cast of Under the Series (2014) by Ivan Silvestrini, in the role of Tea; the last of the ten episodes was presented at the Venice International Film Festival, at the Rome Fiction Fest and at the Roma Web Fest.

In 2015 she was taken for the second season of Alex & Co. in the role of Linda's mother and owner of the school, Victoria Williams. She took part into Il ragazzo della Giudecca and later in the same year she joined the cast of Louis Nero's film The Broken Key, in the role of Esther.

A year later she was chosen by Prada for the mini-fashion film The Hour of the Wolf for the Prada Journal III eyewear campaign.

Chiara works as a producer and director, founding in February 2014 her own company: Licantro Bros Film.

== Private life ==
In 2008 she started a conversion to Judaism.

In 2014 she married Meir Cohen.

In October 2021 she will be in the cast of The Solemn Vow, a movie directed by Eros D'Antona on Amazon prime Usa and Canada. Since 2016, she lives between Milan and Los Angeles.

== Discography ==
=== Singles ===
Year	Name
2006	Nothing at All
2013	L'universo (featuring R.K)
2013	Hallelujah
2014	Sabbia e nuvole (featuring R.K)

=== Music videos ===
Year	Name	Director
2006	Nothing at All	Maki Gherzi
2013	L'universo (featuring R.K)	Alessandro Ricardi
2013	Hallelujah	Massimilio Pelucchi
2014	Sabbia e nuvole (featuring R.K)	Alessandro Ricardi

== Filmography ==
=== Films ===
Year	Title	Role	Notes
2013	I corpi estranei	Passenger	Cameo appearance
2014	The Age of Wars	Secret agent	Short film
2014	Under the Series	Tea	Short film
2015	Dante's Project	Narrator (voice)	Short film
2016	Il ragazzo della Giudecca	Anna	
2017	The Broken Key	Esther Starr	
2018	Loro	Speaker	Uncredited voice cameo
2019	Roller Coaster - Montagne russe	Lea	Short film
2020	Sleep Well	Chiara	Short film
2022	The Solemn Vow	Carol	
TBA	Get Happy: The Life of Judy Garland	Judy Garland	In pre-production

=== Television ===
Year	Title	Role	Notes
1997	Buona Domenica	Herself / Musical guest	Performer with Paola & Chiara
1998, 2000	Domenica in	Herself / Musical guest	Performer with Paola & Chiara
2007	Scherzi a parte	Herself / Guest	Episode: "Scherzo a Paola & Chiara"
2008	Sensualità a corte	Patrizia	Episode: "Episode 4.01"
2009	Amiche per l'Abruzzo	Herself / Performer	Charity concert
2010	I soliti idioti	Herself	Episode: "Episodio tredici"
2015	Alex & Co.	Victoria Williams	Main role (season 2); 18 episodes
2015	The Voice of Italy	Herself / Contestant	Talent show (season 3)
2021	L'ispettore Coliandro	Doctor Farraguscio	Episode: "Kabir Bedi"
2023, 2024	The Sea Beyond	Laura Bertolacci	2 episodes
2023	Drag Race Italia	Herself / Guest judge	Episode: "Night of a Thousand – Paola & Chiara"
2024	PrimaFestival	Herself / Host	Sanremo Music Festival pre-show
