= Vezirja =

Albanian actor and drag queen

- Born: Aleksandër Seitaj; 16 January 1991 (age 34–35); Korçë, Albania
- Other names: Alex Seitaj; Aleks Seitaj
- Occupations: Actor, drag queen
- Years active: 2015–
- Known for: Portokalli; Drag Race Italia

Aleksandër Seitaj, better known by the stage name Vezirja, is an Albanian actor and drag queen best known for her recurring role on Portokalli and for competing on the third season of Drag Race Italia. She is the first person in Albania to publicly perform as a drag queen.

== Early life and career ==
Seitaj was born in Korçë, attended Faik Konica Foreign Languages High School and the University of Arts, and began performing as Vezirja in 2015. She suffered from depression and suicidal tendencies while attending high school. After graduating from university, she spent a year working for RTSH and became part of the creative staff for the show Vështrim Kritik. She portrayed Zylo in the 2022 film adaptation of The Rise and Fall of Comrade Zylo.

In 2023, Vezirja was announced to be part of the cast of the third season of Drag Race Italia. She was sent home by Sissy Lea on the third episode, placing eleventh overall.

== Personal life ==
Seitaj is based in Tirana, Albania.

== Discography ==
=== Singles ===
- Shake It (2023)
- Vezirja (2023)
- Dai Tesoro Dai (2024)
- Daughter (2024)
- Na troia (Parody) (2024)
- Carbonara e Amore (2025)
- Donna Hot (with Morgana Cosmica) (2025)

== Filmography ==
- Drag Race Italia
