= Nehellenia (drag queen) =

Italian drag performer

- Born: Emanuele Aruta
- Occupations: Drag queen; make-up artist; hairdresser
- Television: Drag Race Italia (season 2) RuPaul's Drag Race Global All Stars

Nehellenia is the stage name of Emanuele Aruta, an Italian drag performer who competed on season 2 of Drag Race Italia and on RuPaul's Drag Race Global All Stars.

== Career ==
Aruta is a drag performer, make-up artist, and hairdresser who competed as Nehellenia on season 2 of Drag Race Italia. She won the makeover challenge and placed in the top of the Rusical (musical theatre) challenge. She impersonated Elenoire Ferruzzi for the Snatch Game challenge. Nehellenia was the runner-up of the season, never placed in the bottom, and was named Miss Congeniality.

== Personal life ==
Aruta is from Fiumicino.

Nehellenia is the "drag sister" of Drag Race Italia season 1 runner-up Farida Kant.

Nehellenia started on March 24, 2012, initially learning makeup techniques from online tutorials. Her first drag name was 'Aurora Toxica', before eventually adopting the name Nehellenia, inspired by Queen Nehelenia from Sailor Moon.

Outside of Drag Race, Nehellenia has won several pageant titles, including Drag Factor All Stars Lazio 2018, Miss Drag Queen Lazio 2014, and Miss Drag Queen Facebook Emergenti 2013.

== Filmography ==
=== Television ===
Year	Title	Role	Notes
2022	¡Tú sí que vales!	Herself	Contestant
2022	Drag Race Italia	Herself	Runner Up (season 2)
2024	RuPaul's Drag Race Global All Stars	Herself	Runner Up
2024	Bring Back My Girls	Herself	

=== Music Videos ===
Year	Title	Producer
2024	Nehellenia - "Stars Colliding" (Official Videoclip) Performed on RuPaul's Drag Race Global All Stars	Francesco Tosoni
2024	"Dance Like The World Is Watching 👯‍♀️ RuPaul’s Drag Race Global All Stars"	N/A

== Discography ==
=== Singles ===
Year	Title	Album	Producer
2024	Stars Colliding	Non-Album/Single	N/A

=== Featured singles ===
Year	Title	Album	Producer
2024	"Everybody Say Love (Back Door Gals Europop Mix)" (The Cast of RuPaul's Drag Race Global All Stars)	Non-album single	Leland
2024	"Dance Like the World is Watching" (The Cast of RuPaul's Drag Race Global All Stars)	Non-Album/Single	Leland/Gabe Lopez
