= Lina Galore =

Italian drag performer

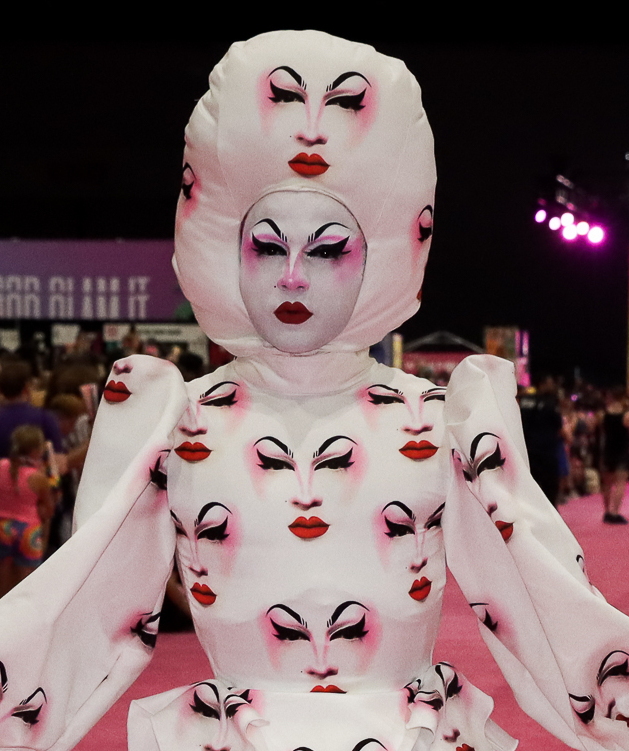
- Lina Galore at RuPaul's DragCon LA in 2024
- Born: Giovanni Montuori; 1988 or 1989 (age 35–36); Montoro, Campania, Italy
- Occupation: Drag queen
- Television: Drag Race Italia (season 3)

Lina Galore is the stage name of Giovanni Montuori (born 1989), an Italian drag performer and the winner of season 3 of Drag Race Italia.

== Early life ==
Giovanni Montuori was born in 1989 and raised in a traditional Southern family, the second of two sons. As a child, he enjoyed playing with dolls. He moved to Milan when he was 18 years old and received a degree in law from the Bocconi University School of Law. Montuori discovered drag in c. 2016-17 while in an eight-year relationship with Sissy Galore, his now ex-boyfriend and drag mother, and adopted his in-drag surname from her. His in-drag first name is derived from actress Lina Sastri. He first dressed in drag in 2017 for a Halloween party alongside Sissy, who dressed as Jo Squillo. Montuori himself dressed as singer Sabrina Salerno. He began performing in drag professionally in 2019.

== Career ==
Lina Galore is a drag performer. In 2020, she was part of the line-up of "Queeriosity Unplugged", an online drag cabaret. She was the winner of season 3 of Drag Race Italia, which aired in 2023. She impersonated Amanda Lear for the Snatch Game challenge.

== Personal life ==
Montuori is from Avellino, and resides in Milan. He has worked as a communication strategy consultant and digital producer. He cites his drag inspirations to be Katya Zamolodchikova, Trixie Mattel, Alaska Thunderfuck, Bob the Drag Queen, Sasha Velour, as well as 1950s pin-ups and Disney villains.

== Filmography ==
- Drag Race Italia (season 3)
- Bring Back My Girls
