= List of Drag Race Italia episodes =

Drag Race Italia is an Italian reality competition television series based on the original American series RuPaul's Drag Race and part of the Drag Race franchise. The series is produced by World of Wonder for Discovery+ in Italy, and subsequently free-to-air on Real Time (season 1–2) and, beginning with the third season, Paramount+. The show is also available worldwide on WOW Presents Plus.

Drag Race Italia debuted on 19 November 2021 on Discovery+. In March 2022, the series was renewed for a second season. In March 2023, the series was renewed for a third season. As of 29 December 2023, 26 episodes of Drag Race Italia have aired.

== Series overview ==
Series	Episodes	Originally released		
Series	Episodes	First released	Last released	Network
1	6	18 November 2021	23 December 2021	Discovery+
2	8	20 October 2022	8 December 2022	Discovery+
3	12	13 October 2023	29 December 2023	Paramount+

== Episodes ==
=== Season 1 (2021) ===
No. overall	No. in season	Title	Original release date
1	1	"Ciao Italia" "Ciao Italia!"	18 November 2021
2	2	"Divas" "Grandi Dive"	26 November 2021
3	3	"Night of a Thousand Raffaella Carràs" "Raffaella, una di noi"	3 December 2021
4	4	"Snatch Game & Fab 80's" "Snatch Game! Tutto può succedere"	7 December 2021
5	5	"Long Live the Drag Bride" "Il giorno più bello"	17 December 2021
6	6	"Grand Finale" "Gran Finale"	23 December 2021

=== Season 2 (2022) ===
No. overall	No. in season	Title	Original release date
7	1	"Little Italy"	20 October 2022
8	2	"Colorful Drag, Lucky Drag" "Drag colorata - Drag fortunata"	27 October 2022
9	3	"Snatch Game" "Snatch Game! Tutto può succedere"	3 November 2022
10	4	"Daughters of the Stars" "Figlie delle stelle"	10 November 2022
11	5	"Festival Drag"	17 November 2022
12	6	"Sporty Queens" "Una Drag nel pallone"	24 November 2022
13	7	"A Walk in Time" "A spasso nel tempo"	1 December 2022
14	8	"Grand Finale" "Gran Finale"	8 December 2022

=== Season 3 (2023) ===
No. overall	No. in season	Title	Original release date
15	1	"Express Yourself"	13 October 2023
16	2	"Walk of Fame" "Walk of fame"	20 October 2023
17	3	"Night of a Thousand Paola and Chiaras" "Night of a thousand Paola e Chiara"	27 October 2023
18	4	"The Devil Wears Drag!" "Il diavolo veste drag!"	3 November 2023
19	5	"Back to School"	10 November 2023
20	6	"Snatch Game - Italia Season 3" "Tutto può succedere"	17 November 2023
21	7	"A Rhythm of Drag" "A ritmo di drag"	24 November 2023
22	8	"Death Drags You" "La morte ti fa drag"	1 December 2023
23	9	"Social Media Queens" "Social media queens"	8 December 2023
24	10	"Dragremo"	15 December 2023
25	11	"The Reunion - Italia Season 3" "Reunion"	22 December 2023
26	12	"Grand Finale - Italia Season 3" "Gran Finale"	29 December 2023
