= Paola Iezzi =

Italian actress, singer and musician (born 1974)

- Iezzi in 2026

Background information
- Born: 30 March 1974 (age 52); Milan, Italy
- Genres: Pop; dance pop
- Occupations: Singer; songwriter; disc jockey; record producer; television personality
- Instruments: Vocals; guitar
- Years active: 1995–present
- Labels: Columbia; Sony

Paola Iezzi (30 March 1974) is an Italian singer, songwriter, disc jockey, record producer, and television personality. Beginning her career as part of the bestselling Italian girl group Paola & Chiara with her sister Chiara, she has since established herself as a solo musical artist and has appeared in various television roles.

== Early life and career beginnings ==
Iezzi was born to parents from Chieti, Abruzzo. In high school, she had singer-songwriter Roberto Vecchioni as a teacher of Latin, Greek and Italian. He plays the guitar, the electric bass and the classical double bass. Following this, Iezzi began to sing with her sister within various rock and funk groups of the Milanese underground, until they were noticed and hired by Claudio Cecchetto to support the group 883 between 1995 and 1996.

== Career ==
=== Paola & Chiara ===
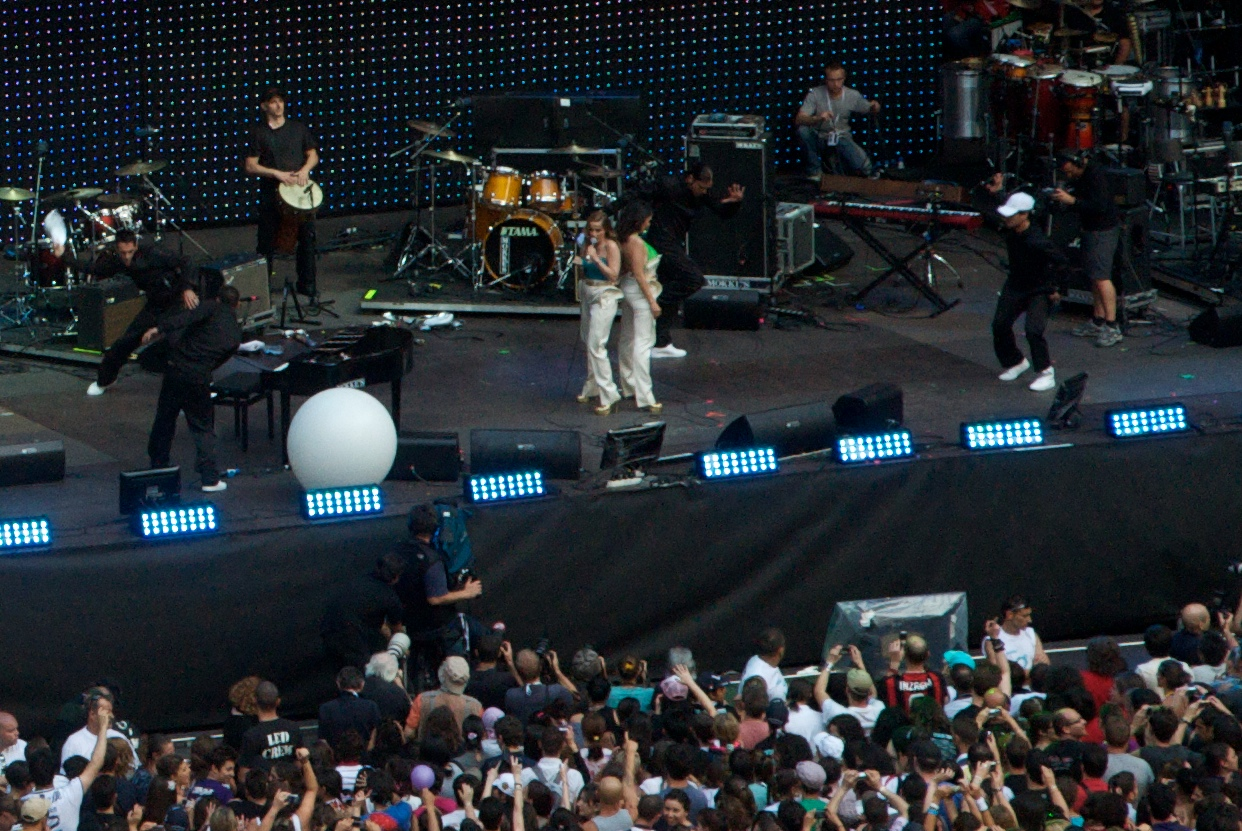
Paola & Chiara at the Amiche per l'Abruzzo event following the 2009 L'Aquila earthquake

In 1996 with her sister Chiara, she founded the duo Paola & Chiara. The duo won the Sanremo Music Festival 1997 in the "New Proposals" category with the song "Amici come prima". In 2000, the duo's most successful single, "Vamos a bailar (Esta vida nueva)", was released, based on the album Television, which obtained a platinum record.

In 2012 The Guardian included the single "Non puoi dire di no" by the Iezzi sisters among the ten best Italian pop songs of the last 50 years.

During the summer of 2013, after the release of eight studio albums and numerous other record works, the two artists announced the definitive dissolution of the musical project. The duo began to be active again a decade later, following their appearance at the Sanremo Music Festival 2023. Throughout the duo's history, they have become the number one bestselling girl group in Italy, selling over 6 million records.

=== Solo work ===
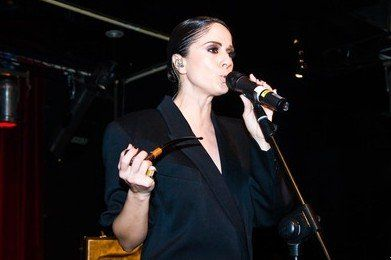
Iezzi in 2009

In 2009, after thirteen years of artistic activity with her sister, she debuted as a solo artist with the single "Alone", an English-language song with black, soul and R&B atmospheres. The physical EP remains at the top of the single PMI/nielsen ranking of independent labels for 7 weeks in a row. The project combines the musical part with the visual part with a video (candidate for the Italian Videoclip Award 2009 and candidate for the Italian Independent Videoclip Award) shot by the fashion photographer Paolo Santambrogio.

In 2012, Iezzi participated in another musical project with the song "In adorazione di te", a duet with an alternative artist and producer Stiv where, in addition to participating as a singer in the song, she co-produces and studies the creative idea for the video that accompanies the piece of music that sees her as co-starring. A few months later, she published the EP Xcept You. The song, from the disco-dance atmospheres of the late 70s, is distributed only digitally. In the same year she began performing as a DJ, music selector and interpreter, both for evenings in clubs and discos, and for special events. In March 2014, she participated as a coach of the dance group Bad Boys on the Rai 1 talent show La pista, hosted by Flavio Insinna. The following June, she starred in a short cameo in the television film Ti amo troppo per dirtelo, directed by director Marco Ponti.

On 24 June 2016, her single "Lovenight" was released. In the following November, she starred in Fabio Volo's TV series Untraditional, broadcast for nine episodes on channel 9 in the irreverent role of Volo's ex-girlfriend. On 5 December 2017, she released the Christmas album A Merry Little Christmas, the first album of her career. On 29 November 2019, she released another edition of the album, A Merry Little Christmas (Deluxe Edition), with three other new songs.

On 10 January 2020, she released the single "LTM" with the collaboration of Myss Keta. On 6 July, she released the single "Mon Amour". In the fall of the same year, she was a music expert in the TV8 program Vite da copertina.

On 8 December 2022, she was a guest judge of the final of the second edition of Drag Race Italia. On 30 December 2022, she sang with Benjamin Ingrosso and the Royal Stockholm Philharmonic Orchestra. They performed Un giorno crescerai, with the text written by Iezzi. In October 2023, she became a judge on the third season of Drag Race Italia. On 13 November 2023, she released the single "The Queens", the soundtrack of Drag Race Italia.

Beginning in September 2024, she debuted as a judge on the eighteenth edition of X Factor. Iezzi released the single "Club Astronave" on 10 December 2024. The following spring she collaborated with Fabio Rovazzi and Dani Faiv on the song "Red Flag", which was released on 9 May 2025. Later in 2025, she returned as a judge for the nineteenth edition of X Factor. Iezzi was the winning mentor of the season when her contestant Rob (Roberta Scandurra) won the season. On 7 November 2025, her single "Superstar" was released.

== Personal life ==
Since 2007, she has been romantically linked to photographer and director Paolo Santambrogio.

== Solo discography ==
=== Studio albums ===
- A Merry Little Christmas (2017)

=== Extended plays ===
- Alone (2009)
- Xcept you (2012)
- Se perdo te (2013)
- i.Love (2014)
- Lovenight (2016)
- Ridi (2018)
- Gli occhi del perdono (2019)
- LTM (Remixes) (with Myss Keta) (2020)
- Mon Amour (2020)

=== Singles ===
- "Alone" (2009)
- "Xcept you" (2010)
- "Se perdo te" (2013)
- "Get Lucky" (2014)
- "Lovenight" (2016)
- "Ridi" (2018)
- "Gli occhi del perdono" (2019)
- "LTM" (featuring Myss Keta) (2020)
- "Mon Amour" (2020)
- "The Queens" (2023)
- "Club astronave" (2024)
- "Red Flag" (with Fabio Rovazzi and Dani Faiv) (2025)
- "Superstar" (2025)

== Filmography ==
=== Television ===
Year	Title	Role(s)	Notes
1996	Sanremo Giovani	Herself / Contestant (Note: as a part of Paola & Chiara)	Newcomers' selections for Sanremo Music Festival
1997	Sanremo Music Festival 1997	Herself / Contestant	Competing with "Amici come prima" (Winner – Newcomers Section)
1998	Sanremo Music Festival 1998	Herself / Contestant	Competing with "Per te" (16th place)
1998	So 90s	Herself / Host	MTV's daily music program
1999	Tribe Generation	Herself / Host	Italia 1 variety show
2005	Sanremo Music Festival 2005	Herself / Contestant	Competing with "A modo mio" (Not finalists)
2008	Sanremo Music Festival 2008	Herself / Guest performer	Performing "L'ultimo film insieme" with Michele Zarrillo in the duets night
2008	Sensualità a corte	Iris	Episode: "Episode 4.01"
2010	I soliti idioti	Herself	Episode: "Quarto episodio"
2013	Nord sud ovest est: Tormentoni on the road	Herself / Co-host	Italia 1 music revival show
2013–2014	Quelli che... il calcio	Herself / Recurring guest	Variety show (season 21)
2014	La pista	Herself / Coach	Dance television competition
2014	Ti amo troppo per dirtelo	Flower seller	Television movie
2016–2018	Untraditional	Paola	Main role (season 1); guest star (season 2)
2020	Vite da copertina	Herself / Opinionist	Talk show
2023	Sanremo Music Festival 2023	Herself / Contestant	Competing with "Furore" (17th place)
2023	Drag Race Italia	Herself / Judge	Italian version of RuPaul's Drag Race (season 3)
2024	PrimaFestival	Herself / Host	Sanremo Music Festival pre-show
2024	Sanremo Music Festival 2024	Herself / Guest performer	Performing "Mamma Maria" and "Sarà perché ti amo" with Ricchi & Poveri in the duets night
2024–present	X Factor	Herself / Judge	Talent competition (season 19–present)
2026	Murders at Barlume	Herself	Episode: "Il gioco delle coppie"
2026	Still Sexy	Herself	Film; cameo
