= Sciura =

Elderly lady from the city center of Milan

A Sciura is an elderly lady from the city center of Milan, who is essentially rich, elegantly dressed and often easily recognizable by her careless attitude. Language-wise, ‘Sciura’ (pronounced /ˈʃuːra/) is the feminine form of ‘Sciur’, which is the Lombard word for ‘Mister’. Although the word in itself can be literally translated as ‘lady’ or ‘Mrs.’, the actual semantic of the term has evolved to a much broader meaning within the context of the city and its hinterland, especially when used as a common noun and not as an honorific.

The term Sciura has been found in fashion, films, theatres, literature and in television for over a decade.

== Meaning ==
A 'Sciura' is typically elderly, wealthy and usually living in downtown Milan, where she strolls the streets, goes to the theatre, shops and eats. The origins of ‘Sciura’ is rooted in the old aristocratic society of Milan.

== Repopularisation of the term ==
The term ‘Sciura’ has been repopularised through appearances in social media. The Instagram account @Sciuraglam showcases Sciura women to their hundreds of thousands of followers.
