= Non sono una signora =

Single by Loredana Bertè

from the album Traslocando
- B-side: "Radio"
- Released: 30 May 1982
- Genre: Pop rock
- Label: CGD
- Songwriter: Ivano Fossati
- Producer: Ivano Fossati

Loredana Bertè singles chronology
"Movie" (1981)	"Non sono una signora" (1982)	"Per i tuoi occhi" (1982)

Audio
- "Non sono una signora" on YouTube

"Non sono una signora" (i.e. "I am not a lady") is a song recorded by Italian singer Loredana Bertè. It was released in 1982 through Compagnia Generale del Disco and included on her seventh studio album Traslocando.

Written and produced by Ivano Fossati, the song influenced Berte's provocative imagine and aggressive style in the following years of her career. It has been described as one of the singer's signature songs.

Commissioned to Fossati by his then-partner, Bertè's sister Mia Martini, the song won the 1982 edition of Festivalbar. It was adapted in Spanish language as "Ella es una señora" (in a version performed by Lucía Méndez) and as "No soy una señora" (in a version performed by Melissa Griffiths and later by María José).

== Track listing ==
7" single – CGD 10407

1. "Non sono una signora" – 3:28 (Ivano Fossati)
2. "Radio" – 3:30 (Maurizio Piccoli)

== Charts ==
Chart	Peak position
Italy	3

== Certifications ==
Region	Certification	Certified units/sales
Italy (FIMI) Sales from January 2009	Platinum	70,000^{‡}
^{‡} Sales+streaming figures based on certification alone.
