= Aura Eternal =

Italian drag performer and entertainer

- Born: Alan Yuri Geraci; March 16, 1998 (age 27); Mondello, Palermo, Italy
- Other names: Aura Eternal Visage
- Television: Drag Race Italia (season 2); Queen of the Universe (season 2)

Aura Eternal Visage, formerly known as Aura Eternal, is the stage name of Alan Yuri Geraci (born March 16, 1998), an Italian drag performer who has competed on the second season of Drag Race Italia as well as the second season of Queen of the Universe.

== Career ==
Aura Eternal completed on the second season of Drag Race Italia, placing in the top three. She is inspired by divas and supermodels from the 1990s such as Mariah Carey and Linda Evangelista. According to Out, "The message Aura Eternal wants to communicate to her audience is one of free love without prejudice; the hunger for freedom; and the desire to be whoever you want, always and in any case." Her stage name comes from "Aura", the energy of Dragon Ball, of which she is a fan, and "Eternal", because she does not want to be forgotten. In August 2023, she added the surname "Visage" to her drag name in an homage to Michelle Visage, who is a permanent judge on the US, UK, and Down Under editions of Drag Race, as well as Queen of the Universe. Eternal met Visage while filming the latter, and changed her name as "a sign of love, respect, and recognition" as to how much their eventual friendship has been a "gift" to her. In the autumn of 2023 she plays "Jackie" in the variety show "Jackie - Don't Call me a Clown" at Mirabilandia Parks in Ravenna.

== Personal life ==
Geraci is based in Palermo, as of 2023. She graduated from the Conservatorio di Musica Vincenzo Bellini di Palermo in classical and jazz piano.

== Filmography ==
=== Television ===
Year	Title	Role	Notes	Ref.
2022	Drag Race Italia (season 2)	Herself/Contestant	Runner-up	
2023	Queen of the Universe (season 2)	Herself/Contestant	3rd Place	

- Bring Back My Girls (2024)
