= Tommaso Zorzi =

Italian TV presenter, writer, TV personality and commentator

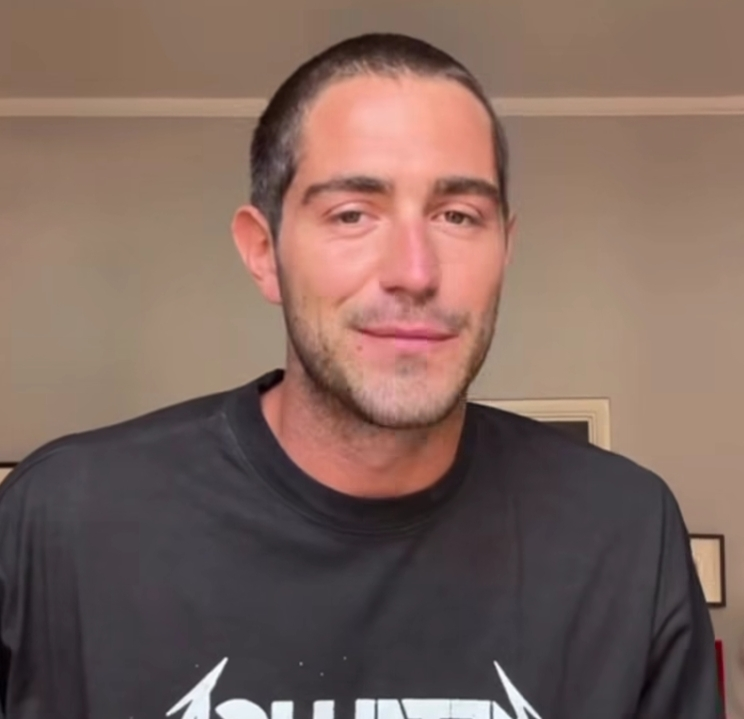
- Tommaso Zorzi in 2025
- Born: 2 April 1995 (age 31); Milan, Italy
- Occupations: Television personality; internet personality; socialite; writer

Tommaso Zorzi (Italian pronunciation: [tomˈmaːzo dˈdzɔrdzi]; born 2 April 1995) is an Italian TV presenter, writer, TV personality and commentator.

== Biography ==
Tommaso Zorzi was born in 1995 in Milan to Lorenzo Zorzi and Armanda Frassinetti. He has a younger sister named Gaia.

In 2016, he launched FashTime, a social network app dedicated to fashion, and subsequently AristoPop, a line of men's handbags and accessories. Later that year he debuted on television thanks to the docu-reality Riccanza, aired on MTV. He took part in all seasons of the programme and in the spin-off #Riccanza Deluxe. In 2018, he participated as a contestant in the second season of Dance Dance Dance on Fox, and in the seventh season of Pechino Express.

In 2020, he hosted Adoro!, the pre-show of La pupa e il secchione e viceversa, along with Giulia Salemi, live-streamed on Mediaset Play before each episode of the reality show. In the same year he released his first novel Siamo tutti bravi con i fidanzati degli altri, published by Mondadori. Between 2020 and 2021 he participated in the fifth season of Grande Fratello VIP, where he came out as the winner.

Again in 2021, he was a commentator in the fifteenth season of the reality show L'isola dei famosi, on Canale 5. Moreover, he was chosen as the host of Il Punto Z, a web show dedicated to the reality show. Since March 2021 he is a regular guest of Maurizio Costanzo Show and since May of the same year he is featured on R101, in the daily strip Facciamo finta che..., alongside Maurizio Costanzo and Carlotta Quadri. Also in that year, Zorzi launched his line of sex toys Tommyland, in collaboration with MySecretCase.

In June 2021, he was selected as a judge, together with actress, host and writer Chiara Francini and drag queen Priscilla (stage name of Mariano Gallo), for Drag Race Italia, the Italian version of RuPaul's Drag Race. The show premiered on the streaming platform Discovery+ at the end of 2021, and afterwards on Real Time, as of 9 January 2022. Additionally, he was the host of After the Race, where he interviewed the eliminated contestants. The show proved to be popular and got renewed for a second season, where Zorzi returned in the fall of 2022.

In March 2022, he published his second book Parole per noi due.

In April 2022 is announced by the BBC as the presenter of two new programmes, Questa è casa mia and Tailor Made - Chi ha la stoffa?, airing respectively from May 2022 on Real Time, and from June 2022 on Discovery+, and later as "free-to-air" from 14 September 2022 on Real Time.

== Television ==
Year	Title	Role(s)	Notes
2016–2019	#Riccanza	Himself	Reality television series regular (seasons 1–4)
2017	MTV Awards 2017	Presenter	Annual ceremony
2018	DanceDanceDance	Contestant	Talent dance show (season 2)
2018	Pechino Express	Contestant	Reality/adventure show (season 7)
2020–2021	Grande Fratello VIP	Contestant – Winner	Reality show (season 5)
2021	GFVIP Late Show	Presenter	Grande Fratello VIP aftershow (Also known as TZ Late show)
2021	L'isola dei famosi	Opinionist	Reality show (season 14)
2021–2022	Drag Race Italia	Judge	Italian version of RuPaul's Drag Race
2021–2022	After the Race	Presenter	Drag Race Italia aftershow
2022	Questa è casa mia!	Presenter	Game show
2022	Tailor Made - Chi ha la stoffa?	Presenter	Talent show

== Radio ==
- Facciamo finta che... (R101, 2021–2023) – regular guest

== Filmography ==
=== Videoclips ===
- Dress Code by Il Pagante (2018) – cameo

== Books ==
- Zorzi, Tommaso (2020). Siamo tutti bravi con i fidanzati degli altri. Milan: Mondadori. ISBN 978-88-04-72264-9.
- Zorzi, Tommaso (2022). Parole per noi due. Milan: Mondadori. ISBN 978-88-04-75015-4.

== Awards ==
- 2022 – Magna Grecia Awards in the category Best newcomer presenter
