= Vamos a bailar (Esta vida nueva) =

Single by Paola & Chiara

from the album Television
- Released: 7 April 2000
- Recorded: 1999
- Genre: Dance-pop; Latin pop
- Length: 4:02
- Label: Sony Music; Columbia
- Songwriters: Paola Iezzi; Chiara Iezzi
- Producers: Paola & Chiara; Roberto Baldi

Paola & Chiara singles chronology
"Nina" (1998)	"Vamos a bailar (Esta vida nueva)" (2000)	"Amoremidai" (2000)

Music video
- "Vamos a bailar" on YouTube

"Vamos a bailar (Esta vida nueva)" (transl. "We're Gonna Dance (This New Life)"), also known just as "Vamos a bailar", is a 2000 song composed and performed by Italian duo Paola & Chiara. It is the lead single of the album Television.

== Overview ==
The song, written, produced and arranged by Paola & Chiara, was initially presented to the artistic commission of the Sanremo Music Festival 2000, being rejected. Released a few months later, it became a massive success, winning the Radio Prize at Festivalbar and the main competition at Un disco per l'estate.

The song was also recorded in Spanish and in English, with lyrics adapted by Gary Kemp. The music video was directed by Luca Guadagnino.

In 2023, Paola & Chiara released a new version of the song, accompanied by Italian singer Tiziano Ferro, with the digital version of their third studio album, Per sempre.

== Charts ==
Chart	Peak position
Belgium (Ultratop)	60
Czech Republic (ČNS IFPI)	24
Germany (Offizielle Deutsche Charts)	29
Italy (FIMI)	1
Italy Airplay (Nielsen Music Control)	1
Norway (VG-lista)	18
Netherlands (Dutch Charts)	95
Poland (Związek Producentów Audio-Video)	16
Spain (Productores de Música de España)	11
Sweden (Sverigetopplistan)	32
Switzerland (Schweizer Hitparade)	13
