= Sensualità a corte =

Italian TV show

- Genre: Sketch comedy
- Created by: Marcello Cesena
- Country of origin: Italy
- Original language: Italian
- No. of seasons: 12

Original release
- Network: Italia 1, Rai 2, TV8
- Release: April 11, 2005 – present

Sensualità a corte (Sensuality at Court) is an Italian sketch comedy, aired in many comedy programs since 2005.

== Plot ==
The series describes the unlikely and demented adventures of Jean Claude, a homosexual baronet, and his despotic mother. Although initially set in late 18th century France, the series actually contains many contemporary elements and characters.

== Characters ==
=== Main ===
- Jean Claude: he is an effeminate and hysterical baronet, protagonist of the series. He is haunted by bad luck and lives in a complicated relationship with his wicked mother.

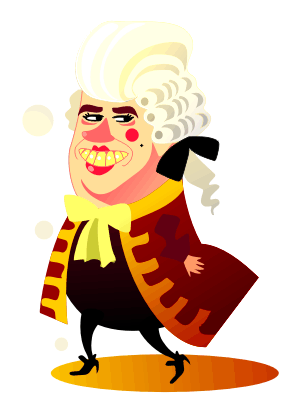
A caricature of Jean Claude, the protagonist of the series

- Madre: literally "Mother", she is a haughty noblewoman, mother of Jean Claude. Touchy and selfish, she deeply hates her son and is perpetually in search of fame and youth.
- Madrina: she is Jean Claude's fairy godmother ("madrina" in Italian). Old and clumsy, her attempts to help her godson always end in tragedy.
- Cassandra: she is Jean Claude's wife. In the first seasons she does not realize her husband's homosexuality and tries to seduce him. Over time she becomes an ally and a good friend.
- Daiana: better known as Wonder Woman, she is a mustachioed and masculine superheroine, as well as Jean Claude's girlfriend from season 5. She tries to help Jean Claude with harebrained plans that always end in disaster.
- Jean Claude's lovers: in the early seasons, Jean Claude changes partners every season, and is usually unreciprocated. Among them are Batman (Renato, season 1–3, 11–12), Darth Vader (Stefano, season 2), Diabolik (Armando, season 3), and Robin Hood (Titti, season 4).

=== Secondary ===
- Colonel Gustav von Outlet: he is an evil scientist who tries to kill Madre or Jean Claude.
- Jean-François: he is Jean Claude's ruthless twin brother and, like him, is completely inept. He is identical to his twin, except for a black mustache and heterosexuality. He plots with Madre to kill Jean Claude.
- Aunt Genoveffa: she is Jean Claude's despotic and talkative aunt. In the season 12, she is the main antagonist, leading SPECTRE to kill her sister Madre.
- Padre: literally "Father", he is Jean Claude's father; he appears in very few episodes, and dies from tartar.
