= Elecktra Bionic =

Italian drag performer

- Born: Mattia Di Renzo
- Occupation: Drag queen
- Television: Drag Race Italia

Elecktra Bionic is the stage name of Mattia Di Renzo, an Italian drag queen based in Turin. They are best known for winning the first season of Drag Race Italia.

== Career ==
They were announced as a contestant on Drag Race Italia in 2021. They won four out of a possible six mini challenges on the show, but never won a maxi challenge. They eventually became the first contestant in the Drag Race franchise to win their season without winning any maxi challenges. In April 2022, Elecktra revealed that they had been invited to compete on Canada's Drag Race: Canada vs. the World but declined.

== Personal life ==
In December 2018, Elecktra Bionic was the victim of a homophobic attack. They were harassed and punched by two French men. They, in full drag, were able to win a fist fight against both and scare them off.

== Filmography ==
=== Television ===
Year	Title	Role	Notes
2021	Drag Race Italia (season 1)	Herself	Contestant (Winner)
2022	Drag Race Italia (season 2)	Herself	Special guest; Episodes: "Daughters of the Stars" and "Grand Finale"
2023	Alessandro Borghese - Celebrity Chef (season 2)	Herself	Contestant
2023	Non sono una signora	Herself	Coach/Judge

== Discography ==
=== As featured artist ===
Title	Year
"A Little Bit of Love (Cast Version)" (RuPaul featuring The Cast of Drag Race Italia, Season 1 (Note: The queens on this track from the cast include Elecktra Bionic, Farida Kant, Le Riche and Luquisha Lubamba.))	2021
