= Paola & Chiara =

Italian pop music duo

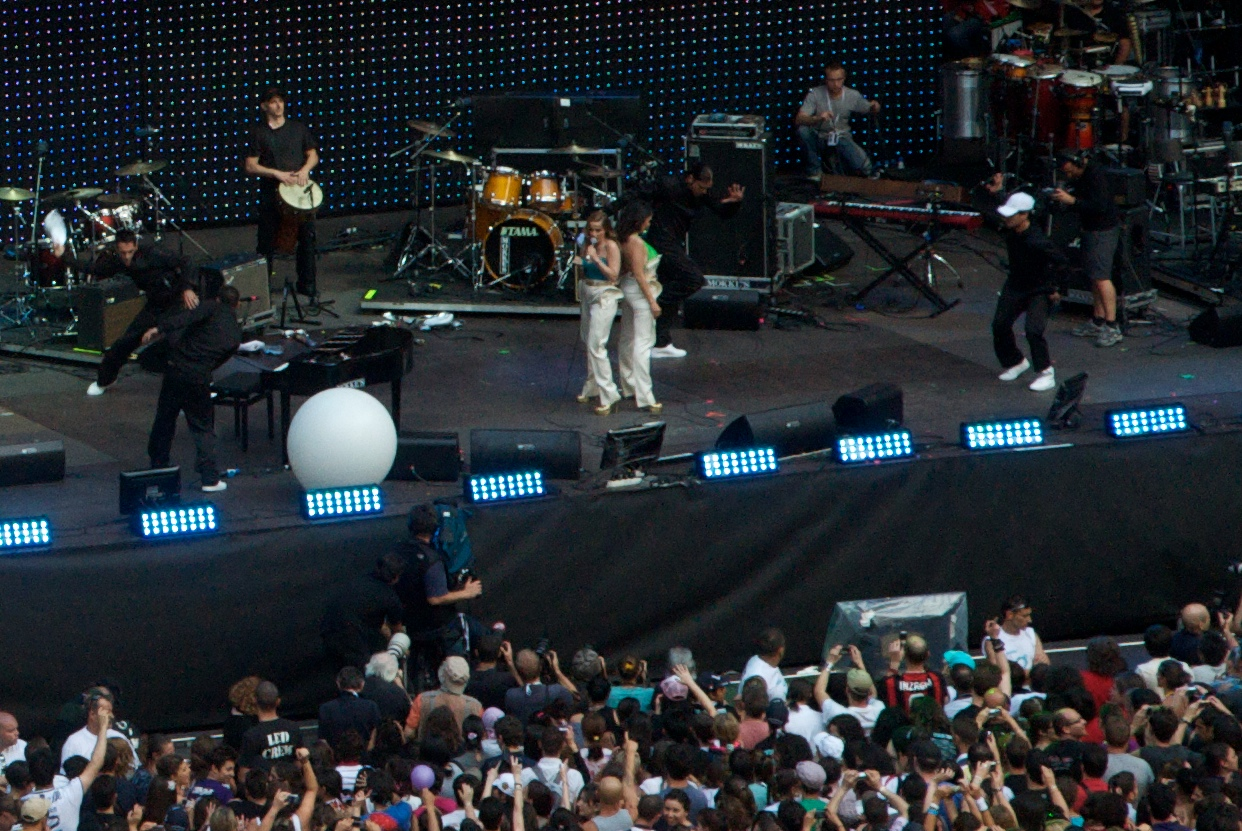
- Paola & Chiara at the Amiche per l'Abruzzo event following the 2009 L'Aquila earthquake

Background information
- Origin: Milan, Italy
- Genres: Pop; dance pop
- Instruments: Voice; guitar; bass guitar
- Years active: 1996–2013; 2022–present
- Labels: Sony BMG/Columbia (1997–2006, 2022–present); Universal Music (2007–2013)
- Members: Paola Iezzi; Chiara Iezzi
- Website: www.paolaechiara.it

Paola & Chiara (Italian pronunciation: [ˈpaːola e kˈkjaːra]) is an Italian pop music duo consisting of Paola and Chiara Iezzi, two sisters who were born in Milan. They are the best selling female Italian group with over 6 million records sold.

Their national career began when the manager of Max Pezzali's pop band 883 saw the sisters playing in Milan and subsequently signed them to the band. The sisters' career as "Paola e Chiara" began in 1997 when they parted from 883.

In 1997, the sisters won the New-Artist category for the song "Amici come prima" at the Sanremo Festival. Soon after, they released their first album. They have since released five other studio albums, incorporating shifting musical influences (such as Spanish Pop and Celtic elements) and performing in several different languages, achieving international success in 2000.

In July 2013, the duo released the album Giungla, which also features rappers Razza Krasta and Moreno. Shortly after the release of the album, they announced their separation. The duo reunited in 2022 and participated in the Sanremo Festival the following year. Due to the great public acclaim, the duo released other music singles and made several appearances.

== Background ==
Chiara Iezzi was born on 27 February 1973, and Paola Iezzi was born on 30 March 1974.

The sisters formed their first music group called Elefunky, which specialized in funky music. They played in various clubs in Milan and were discovered by manager Claudio Cecchetto, who was looking for a group that would help artist Max Pezzali.

The sisters left the club scene and joined up with Max Pezzali to play at many festivals in Italy. They became part of Pezzali's band 883, playing the guitar and the trombone. The group released in 1995 the album La donna, il sogno e il grande incubo. After a big tour to promote the album, the sisters decided to become solo artists.

The sisters visited Scotland after seeing the movie Braveheart, to visit the locations where the movie was shot. The trip was an inspiration to both and gave them a feeling of real freedom. The sisters returned to Scotland again and were inspired to write many songs.

They decided to participate in the Sanremo Festival new-talent search in 1996. The song "In viaggio" ("In Transit") led the sisters to win the contest, gaining fans and admiration.

On 4 December 2022, it was officially announced that Paola e Chiara would participate in the Sanremo Music Festival 2023. "Furore" was later announced as their entry for the Sanremo Music Festival 2023.

== Music career ==
=== Ci chiamano bambine (1997) ===
- Released: 2 February 1997
- Chart peak: #33 (ITA)

In 1997, after the victory in the New-Artist section of the Sanremo Festival, they released their first album, Ci chiamano bambine ("They Call Us Children"). The album contained a mixture of rock and pop music. They went on to release other three singles from the album: "Ci chiamano bambine", "Bella" and "Ti vada o no" (included in the Italian original soundtrack of the Walt Disney animated film Hercules). With "Per Te", they took part in the 1998 Sanremo Festival, releasing a new edition of the debut album. Ci chiamano bambine went platinum, selling more than 150,000 copies.

=== Giornata storica (1998) ===
- Released: 29 October 1998
- Chart peak: –

After a successful tour of Italy, they released the second album titled Giornata storica ("Historical Day") in November 1998. The album had an Irish flavour and a more rock sound. Despite this, most of the Italian public didn't seem to connect with the album and sales were disappointing.

Three singles were released from the album, "Non puoi dire di no", "Nina" and "Colpo di fulmine", the first gaining heavy rotation on television.

=== Television (2000) ===
- Released: 19 June 2001
- Chart peak: #23; (ITA) No. 32 (SWI)

After a long break, the huge summer hit song "Vamos a bailar (Esta vida nueva)" (Spanish for "Let's Dance", in a Latin pop style and featuring Spanish lyrics) was released in April 2000. The song remained on top of the Italian charts for many weeks. The track was included in the lucky dance-pop album Television. It was seen as a change in style, being a mixture of Spanish Pop tunes and dance beats.

Four singles were released from the album:

- "Vamos a bailar (Esta vida nueva)"
- "Amoremidai"
- "Viva el amor! (Rapino Brothers Remix)"
- "Fino alla fine (2001 Vision)"

In the summer of 2000 Paola a Chiara won the Festivalbar Best Song Award with "Vamos a bailar" achieving success all over Europe, Japan and Latin America. The album is also available in English and Spanish, and went on selling about 800,000 copies around the world. In June 2001 Television got a face-lift and was re-released with remixed tracks and multimedia content.

=== Festival (2002) ===
- Released: 24 June 2002
- Chart peak: #13; (ITA)

May 2002 saw the release of the fourth album Festival and its first single, also called "Festival". The song reached number six in the Italian single chart. The album showed a slight change in direction, being more melodic and vocally more elaborate and textured even if again based on dance music.

Three singles were released from Festival

- "Festival"
- "Hey!"
- "Kamasutra (Dance Rebel Mix)"

=== Blu (2004) ===
- Released: 10 May 2004
- Chart peak: #27; (ITA)

In 2004 the album Blu followed the same direction as the previous two albums, but with a slight change of style towards the 1980s electropop. Despite high expectations, the single "Blu" did not make it as a big summer hit of 2004 and further singles were stalled.

Two singles were released from "Blu":

- "Blu"
- "Mare di più" (Radio only)

=== Greatest Hits (2005) ===
- Released: 24 February 2005
- Chart peak: #25; (ITA)

2005 saw the end of the first chapter in the sisters' career with the release of Greatest Hits. This collection featured two new songs that were released as singles in the same year and a DVD (also available separately) that contains all their promo videos and some "making of" of the aforementioned clips. An appetizer from the collection was the Sanremo Festival tune "A modo mio". Later in the summer of 2005 the second new track from the collection, "Fatalità", was released and followed by a tour that ended in September.

=== Nothing at All (2007) ===
- Released: 26 January 2007
- Chart peak: #2 (ITA)

Chiara released a solo single CD in January 2007 called "Nothing at All" for Raising Malawi, based on a song by Madonna, "You Thrill Me/Erotica". The song peaked at number 2 in Italy.

=== Win The Game (2007) ===
- Released: 16 November 2007
- Chart peak: #40; (ITA)

In June 2007 Paola e Chiara released the first single off their sixth studio album, Win the Game. It was released prior to the album's debut. The single "Second Life" peaked in the Italian chart at No. 4.

The success of Win The Game on the Italian markets was relatively poor. The album entered the Italian album chart at No. 40 and disappeared from the chart the following week.

The second single, released in October 2007, was the song "Cambiare pagina". The third single, "Vanity & Pride", saw a limited release in May 2008. All singles from Win the Game were released in two formats, CD single and vinyl.

=== Alone (2009) ===
In January 2009 Paola published a solo single, an English-language tune called "Alone", which peaked at number 36 in Italy. The song differs a lot from the previous work of the sisters, with a strong soul and R&B flavour. Only available digitally, in February 2009 an EP of remixes of "Alone" was published, called "Dancing Alone".

=== Per Sempre (2023) ===
In May 2023 the duo published the greatest hits "Per Sempre" featured many Italian music singers and dj (like Gabry Ponte, Emma Marrone and Tiziano Ferro ) revisiting the duo's most successful singles. The album contains the Sanremo comeback hits "Furore" and the summer hit "Mare Caos" (published in the same summer).

=== Lambada (2023) ===
The duo featured Boomdabash's summer hits titled "Lambada", participating in the official music video also.

=== Solo Mai (2023) ===
In December 2023, the duo officially published the single "Solo Mai" two days after they presented the song in a television preview during the presentation evening of the Sanremo 2024. According to several interviews the singers released, the song is about asking for a hand when we feel like we don't fit in or need help in this uncertain world that sometimes may look dystopian. The music video for "Solo Mai" recorded in 2024 at Multiset Bicocca Studio in Milan, features Italian supermodel Eva Riccobono portraying "Mother Nature" while wearing a fake pregnancy belly. The song was first composed during Paola Iezzi's stay in Stockholm while working on music before the reunion during the COVID pandemic with many Swedish composers and finished when the duo officially came back after they participated in Sanremo 2023.

=== Other selected singles ===
Information
Second Life
- Released: 22 June 2007
- Chart peak: 4 (ITA)
Cambiare Pagina
- Released: 16 October 2007
- Chart peak: 7 (ITA)
Pioggia d'Estate
- Released: 6 July 2010
- Chart peak: 26

== DVDs ==
Information
Paola e Chiara The Video Collection: 1997–2005
- Released: 24 February 2005
- Chart peak: No. 5 (ITA)
- FIMI Certificate:
- Italian Sales:

== Discography ==
=== Studio albums ===
- 1997: Ci chiamano bambine
- 1998: Giornata storica
- 2000: Television
- 2002: Festival
- 2004: Blu
- 2007: Win the Game
- 2010: Milleluci
- 2013: Giungla

=== Compilations ===
- 2005: Greatest Hits
- 2015: The Story
- 2023: Per sempre

=== DVDs ===
- 2005: Paola e Chiara The Video Collection: 1997–2005

=== Top ten singles ===
Year	Single	Peak positions
Year	Single	ITA
2000	"Vamos a bailar (Esta vida nueva)"	1
2000	"Viva el amor!"	8
2002	"Festival"	6
2005	"A modo mio"	10
2007	"Second Life"	4
2007	"Cambiare pagina"	7

Awards and achievements
Preceded by Syria with "Non ci sto"	Sanremo Music Festival; Winner Newcomers section 1997	Succeeded by Annalisa Minetti with "Senza te o con te"
