= Drag Race Italia =

Italian reality competition television series

- Genre: Reality competition
- Based on: RuPaul's Drag Race
- Directed by: Marco Manes
- Presented by: Priscilla
- Judges: Priscilla; Tommaso Zorzi; Chiara Francini; Paola Iezzi; Paolo Camilli
- Opening theme: RuPaul's Drag Race theme
- Ending theme: "U Wear It Well" (season 1); "Rock It (To the Moon)" (season 2)
- Country of origin: Italy
- Original language: Italian
- No. of seasons: 3
- No. of episodes: 26 (list of episodes)

Production
- Executive producers: RuPaul Charles; Fenton Bailey; Randy Barbato
- Producer: Dimitri Cocciuti
- Running time: 70–95 minutes
- Production companies: Ballandi Arts; World of Wonder; Discovery Italia (2021–2022); Paramount Global Italy (2023)

Original release
- Network: Discovery+ (2021–2022); MTV and Paramount+ (2023)
- Release: 18 November 2021 – 29 December 2023

Related
- Drag Race franchise

Drag Race Italia is an Italian reality competition television series based on the original American series RuPaul's Drag Race and part of the Drag Race franchise. The series is produced by World of Wonder for Discovery+ in Italy, and subsequently free-to-air on Real Time (season 1–2) and, beginning with the third season, Paramount+. The show is also available worldwide on WOW Presents Plus.

Drag Race Italia is the eighth international adaptation of the American reality competition series RuPaul's Drag Race.

Drag Race Italia debuted on 19 November 2021 on Discovery+. Episodes premiere on a weekly basis every Thursday, and later aired on Real Time on primetime. Starting with the third season, the series premiere on streaming platform Paramount+, and later on MTV on primetime.

Elecktra Bionic, won the first season, with Farida Kant and Le Riche as runners-up, while Luquisha Lubamba was named Miss Congeniality. In March 2022, the series was renewed for a second season. La Diamond won the second season. In March 2023, the series was renewed for a third season.

== Production ==
=== Judges ===
The competition series is hosted and judged primarily by Italian drag queen Priscilla. On 30 June 2021, it was announced that actress Chiara Francini and television personality Tommaso Zorzi, would make appearances as the competition's prominent judges.

In June 2023, coinciding with the program's move to the Paramount+ streaming platform, Priscilla and Francini announced they would be returning for the show's third season while Zorzi would not citing scheduling issues with Discovery+'s shows. In the same day singer and DJ Paola Iezzi and actor Paolo Camilli were announced to be joining the panel to replace Zorzi.

Judges on Drag Race Italia
Judge	Season		
Judge	1	2	3
Priscilla	Main	Main	Main
Chiara Francini	Main	Main	Main
Tommaso Zorzi	Main	Main	
Paola Iezzi		Guest	Main
Paolo Camilli			Main

=== Contestants ===
Since 2021, there has been a total of 31 contestants featured in Drag Race Italia.

== Series overview ==
Series	Contestants	Episodes	Originally released		Winner	Runner(s)-up	Miss Congeniality
Series	Contestants	Episodes	First released	Last released	Winner	Runner(s)-up	Miss Congeniality
1	8	6	18 November 2021	23 December 2021	Elecktra Bionic	Farida Kant; Le Riche	Luquisha Lubamba
2	10	8	20 October 2022	8 December 2022	La Diamond	Aura Eternal; Nehellenia	Nehellenia
3	13	12	13 October 2023	29 December 2023	Lina Galore	Melissa Bianchini	Silvana Della Magliana

== Episodes ==
=== Season 1 (2021) ===
The first season of Drag Race Italia began airing on 19 November 2021 on Discovery+ in Italy and World of Wonder's streaming service WOW Presents Plus internationally. It was followed later by a free-to-air broadcast on Real Time, which premiered on 9 January 2022. Casting occurred in early 2021 with production starting in summer 2021. A trailer for the first season was posted via social media on 28 October 2021. The season ran for 6 episodes and concluded on 23 December 2021. Elecktra Bionic, Farida Kant, Le Riche and Luquisha Lubamba made the final, and Electra Bionic was the winner of the first season.

=== Season 2 (2022) ===
In March 2022, it was announced that Discovery+ renewed the series for a second season. At the same time, it is announced that all the judges from the first season have also been reconfirmed. A trailer for the second season was posted via social media on 29 September 2022. It premiered on 20 October 2022. The season ran for 8 episodes and concluded on 8 December 2022. Aura Eternal, La Diamond, Nehellenia and La Petite Noire, made the final, with La Diamond winning the title of Italy's Next Drag Superstar.

=== Season 3 (2023) ===
Production of a third season was announced, with casting opening in March 2023. In the same announcement it was confirmed that the show would move to the streaming platform Paramount+. In June 2023, it was announced that Zorzi will not return as a judge, due to a scheduling conflict with another project he is working on. The third season judging panel included singer and DJ Paola Iezzi and actor Paolo Camilli. Lina Galore, Melissa Bianchini, La Sheeva and Silvana Della Magliana, made to the finale, with Lina Galore winning the title of third Italy's Next Drag Superstar.

== Accolades ==
Award	Year	Category	Recipient(s) and nominee(s)	Result	Ref.
Diversity Media Awards	2023	Best TV show	Drag Race Italia	Won	

== Discography ==
List of singles
Title	Season
"A Little Bit of Love (Cast Version)" (Elecktra Bionic, Farida Kant, Le Riche, and Luquisha Lubamba)	1
"Portento (Na Na Na Na)" (Aura Eternal, La Diamond, Nehellenia, and La Petite Noire)	2
"Queens (Cast Version)" (Lina Galore, Melissa Bianchini, La Sheeva and Silvana Della Magliana)	3
