= Priscilla (drag queen) =

Italian drag performer

- Born: Mariano Gallo; December 22, 1976 (age 49); Naples, Campania, Italy
- Occupation: Drag queen
- Television: Drag Race Italia
- Political party: Possibile

Mariano Gallo (born December 22, 1976), known by the stage name Priscilla, is an Italian drag performer based in Mykonos, Greece, best known for hosting the drag competition television series Drag Race Italia.

== Career ==
Priscilla gained notoriety in Italy after being on the talk show Al posto tuo beginning in 2002. In 2007, she won the Miss Drag Queen Italy pageant. In 2017, she performed on Ellada Eheis Talento. In September 2021, Priscilla was announced as the host of the first season of Drag Race Italia.

Priscilla regularly performs in Mykonos.

In 2022, Gallo starred as Cecil Beaton in the musical Dive.

== Early and personal life ==
Gallo was born in 1976 in Campania. He is originally from Naples. He is gay, and first came out at age 19.

Gallo was raised Catholic, but later adopted Buddhism.

== Filmography ==
=== Film ===
| Year | Title | Role(s) | Notes |
|---|---|---|---|
| 2023 | A mia immagine | Francesco | Short film; credited as Mariano Gallo |
| 2023 | Nuovo Olimpo | Mastino | Credited as Mariano Gallo |

=== Television ===
| Year | Title | Role(s) | Notes |
|---|---|---|---|
| 2017 | Ellada Eheis Talento | Contestant (in drag) | Credited as Priscilla |
| 2021–present | Drag Race Italia | Presenter and judge (in drag) | Italian version of RuPaul's Drag Race |
| 2023 | Home Sweet Rome | Himself (in drag) | Episode: "Big Girl Unicorn Pajamas" |
| 2024 | Bring Back My Girls | Guest host (in drag) | Season 3, episode 7 |
