= Brazil's Next Top Model season 1 =

Season of television series

Brazil's Next Top Model
- Season 1
- Season 1 cast
- Presented by: Fernanda Motta
- Judges: Fernanda Motta; Alexandre Herchcovitch; Erika Palomino; Paulo Borges
- No. of episodes: 12

Release
- Original network: Sony Entertainment
- Original release: 3 October – 19 December 2007

Season chronology
- Next → Season 2

The first season of Brazil's Next Top Model premiered on 3 October 2007 on Sony Entertainment Television. Filming for the season took place from August to September 2007. Model Fernanda Motta served as the show's host, with a panel consisting of photographer Paulo Borges, journalist Erika Palomino, and designer Alexandre Herchcovitch. Artistic director Carlos Pazetto served as the contestants' mentor throughout the competition.

The prizes for this season included a R$200,000 modeling contract with Ford Models, and an editorial spread and the cover of Elle Brasil. The winner of the competition was 19 year-old Mariana Velho from Santos, São Paulo.

The series was renewed for two more seasons following the conclusion of season 1.

== Cast ==
=== Contestants ===
(Ages stated are at start of contest)

Contestant	Age	Height	Hometown	Finish	Place
Dandara Oliveira	19	1.72 m (5 ft 7 1/2 in)	Belo Horizonte	Episode 2	13
Danielle Zimmermann	20	1.74 m (5 ft 8 1/2 in)	São José	Episode 3	12
Isabella Chaves	24	1.74 m (5 ft 8 1/2 in)	Belo Horizonte	Episode 4	11
Anne Wrobel	21	1.75 m (5 ft 9 in)	Tibagi	Episode 5	10
Andrea Medina	23	1.78 m (5 ft 10 in)	Florianópolis	Episode 6	9
Érycka Martins	24	1.80 m (5 ft 11 in)	Teresina	Episode 7	8
Karin Cavalli	25	1.80 m (5 ft 11 in)	Caxias do Sul	Episode 8	7
Lana Sartin Silva	19	1.74 m (5 ft 8 1/2 in)	Anápolis	Episode 9	6
Ana Paula Costa	23	1.75 m (5 ft 9 in)	São Paulo	Episode 10	5
Mariana Richardt	21	1.76 m (5 ft 9 1/2 in)	São Paulo	Episode 11	4
Lívia Maria Senador	22	1.72 m (5 ft 7 1/2 in)	Rio de Janeiro	Episode 12	3
Ana Paula Bertola	23	1.75 m (5 ft 9 in)	Pratânia	Episode 12	2
Mariana Velho	19	1.76 m (5 ft 9 1/2 in)	Santos	Episode 12	1

=== Judges ===
- Fernanda Motta (host)
- Alexandre Herchcovitch
- Erika Palomino
- Paulo Borges

=== Other cast members ===
- Carlos Pazetto

== Episodes ==
No. overall	No. in season	Title	Original release date
1	1	"Episode 1"	3 October 2007
The 20 semi-finalists arrived at the Sheraton Sao Paulo WTC Hotel for casting week, where they met creative director Carlos Pazetto before having their headshots taken and meeting host Fernanda Motta for the first time. They later had one on one interviews with the judges, and after facing the first elimination, the remaining 16 semi-finalists took part in a photo shoot on the hotel's rooftop wearing designer gowns. At the end of the week, the judges selected the final 13 contestants.
2	2	"Episode 2"	10 October 2007
The finalists moved into the model home, and had a runway lesson with instructor Namie Whihby. They later had a runway challenge wearing shoes designed by Fernando Pires, in which Karin was chosen as the winner. On set, the models were photographed sporting bath and beauty products for a commercial beauty shoot. At judging, Dandara and Érycka landed in the bottom two, and Dandara was eliminated from the competition.: Special guests: Namie Whihby, Fernando Pires
3	3	"Episode 3"	17 October 2007
The contestants met judge Alexandre Herchcovitch and took part in timed challenge where they were required to style themselves in articles of clothing that best described their own personal sense of style. Érycka was deemed as the best performer. For the photo shoot, the models were asked to portray the 12 signs of the Zodiac. At elimination, Érycka and Danielle landed in the bottom two. Érycka was given another chance, and Danielle was eliminated from the competition.: Special guests: Claudio Belizário
4	4	"Episode 4"	24 October 2007
The remaining 11 contestants received makeovers, and later took part in a photo shoot posing alongside a vintage sports car. At the end of the session, the models were treated to a special dinner and sets of designer shoes. Ana Paula Bertola and Isabella landed in the bottom two during elimination, and Isabella was eliminated from the competition.
5	5	"Episode 5"	31 October 2007
Special guests: Kenji Giselli, Pedro Molinos
6	6	"Episode 6"	7 November 2007
Special guests: Caco Ricci, Andrew Schiliró, Dudu Bertholini
7	7	"Episode 7"	14 November 2007
Special guests: Christine Yufon, Cristiano Burmester
8	8	"Episode 8"	21 November 2007
Special guests: Max Weber, Andrew Guerreiro Lopes
9	9	"Episode 9"	28 November 2007
Special guests:
10	10	"Episode 10"	5 December 2007
Special guests: Paulo Zulu, Rodrigo Marques, Namie Wihby
11	11	"Episode 11"	12 December 2007
Special guests: Rogério Sampaio
12	12	"Episode 12"	19 December 2007
Special guests: Clóvis Pessoa, Daniela Mercury, André Passos, Lenita Assef

== Results ==
Order	Episode												
Order	1	2	3	4	5	6	7	8	9	10	11	12	
1	Mariana V.	Mariana R.	Lana	Lana	Lívia	Lana	Ana Paula C.	Ana Paula B.	Lívia	Mariana V.	Mariana V.	Ana Paula B.	Mariana V.
2	Andrea	Lana	Karin	Lívia	Lana	Ana Paula B.	Ana Paula B.	Ana Paula C.	Ana Paula B.	Lívia	Lívia	Mariana V.	Ana Paula B.
3	Ana Paula C.	Andrea	Ana Paula B.	Mariana R.	Mariana V.	Ana Paula C.	Lívia	Lívia	Mariana R.	Ana Paula B.	Ana Paula B.	Lívia	
4	Anne	Anne	Lívia	Érycka	Ana Paula B.	Mariana V.	Mariana V.	Mariana V.	Mariana V.	Mariana R.	Mariana R.		
5	Karin	Isabella	Andrea	Mariana V.	Karin	Karin	Karin	Mariana R.	Ana Paula C.	Ana Paula C.			
6	Lana	Danielle	Isabella	Karin	Érycka	Érycka	Mariana R.	Lana	Lana				
7	Mariana R.	Ana Paula C.	Ana Paula C.	Anne	Ana Paula C.	Mariana R.	Lana	Karin					
8	Dandara	Ana Paula B.	Mariana V.	Ana Paula C.	Mariana R.	Lívia	Érycka						
9	Lívia	Karin	Mariana R.	Andrea	Andrea	Andrea							
10	Ana Paula B.	Lívia	Anne	Ana Paula B.	Anne								
11	Érycka	Mariana V.	Érycka	Isabella									
12	Danielle	Érycka	Danielle										
13	Isabella	Dandara											

The contestant was eliminated
The contestant won the competition
