= Top Model, o Reality season 1 =

Top Model, o Reality
- Season 1
- Semi-Finalists of Top Model, o Reality, season 1
- No. of episodes: 13

Release
- Original network: Rede Record
- Original release: 2 September – 25 November 2012

Top Model, o Reality, season 1 was the first season of the Brazilian series Top Model, o Reality, which was hosted by Ana Hickmann and co-hosted by Ticiane Pinheiro during casting weeks. Season one featured twenty-four semi finalists that were pared down to fourteen finalists in the main competition.
The prizes for this season are a 150,000 Reais contract with Ana Hickmann's brand and a contract with Way Model Management.

== Casting weeks ==
Each casting week, four contestants of a designated city were selected to earn a spot in the top 24 for this season. In the fourth and final casting week, the 14 finalists were selected to proceed to the main competition.

== Episode summaries ==
=== Episode 1 ===
Aired: September 2, 2012

The premiere episode showed the casting in the city of São Paulo and the metropolitan area of São Paulo, where the first 4 candidates of the show were selected for the Top 24.

Ticiane Pinheiro led this first part of the show, assisting in the process that featured two stages. The first stage featured a round with 500 contestants. Sixteen contestants were selected to participate in the second stage, leaving only 4 semi-finalists with a place in the top 24.

- Selected Contestants: Eduarda Ferreira, Tamirys Macedo, Thayssa Ribeiro & Viviane Oliveira
- Photographer: Gustavo Arrais
- Guest Judges: Bruna di Tullio, Gustavo Sarti, Natália Guimarães, Zeca de Abreu, Wan Vieira

=== Episode 2 ===
Aired: September 9, 2012

Ticiane Pinheiro keep in her journey to find beautiful models in Brazil. This time, Midwest region had its casting in Goiânia, GO. It was called 450 girls, but only 16 passed to the second fase of casting week, and then only 4 will continuing on the show.

- Selected Contestants: Giovana Almeida, Jéssica Nobre, Scarlet Cardoso & Lais Bretas
- Photographer: Cristina Diniz
- Guest Judges: Gustavo Sarti, Zeca de Abreu, Natália Guimarães, Camila Rodrigues

The show also showed the casting on the North-Northeast region, on the city of Fortaleza, CE. 470 gils was pre-selected, but only 4 keep on the show.

- Selected Contestants: Camila Andrade, Jéssica Vaz, Livia Studart & Priscila Levy
- Photographer: Caio Ferreira
- Guest Judges: Gustavo Sarti, Zeca de Abreu, Marcelo Gomes, Daniela Lopes, Claudio Silveira

=== Episode 3 ===
Aired: September 16, 2012

The show introduced the casting on the Southeast region of Brazil. The Southeast region had two casting weeks. The first casting was shown in episode one. The second casting was held in Rio de Janeiro, with more than 500 girls.

- Selected Contestants: Adriene Scherer, Fernanda Gomes, Paloma Bicalho & Rafaella Rodrigues
- Photographer: Gustavo Arrais
- Guest Judges: Gustavo Sarti, Zeca de Abreu, Natália Guimarães, Matheus Mazzafera, Gustavo Arrais

The South region had two casting weeks, one in Porto Alegre, and the other in Florianópolis. More than 300 girls were selected, but only 16 progressed to the second day. One of selected girls, Bárbara Santos, decided to quit the show.

Porto Alegre

- Selected Contestants: Luana Reichert, Nathália Gomes, Natasha Raimundo & Sancler Frantz
- Photographer: Gustavo Arrais
- Guest Judges: Gustavo Sarti, Zeca de Abreu, Natália Guimarães, Matheus Mazzafera, Gustavo Arrais

Florianópolis

- Selected Contestants: Cláudia de Liz, Ellen Teodoro, Fátima Correia & Mayara Gomes
- Photographer: Tauana Sofia
- Guest Judges Gustavo Sarti, Zeca de Abreu, Natália Guimarães, Juliane Trevisol, Tauana Sofia

=== Episode 4 ===
Aired: September 23, 2012

The Top 24 first landed in São Paulo, where they find Gustavo Sardi that leads to a tour of Oscar Freire Avenue. There, the girls attend a cocktail of the program in store brand Carmen Steffens. Then the girls are brought to the Sport Spa Resort, where they find Matheus Mazzafera and can get to know better. The next day, meet again Ticiane Pinheiro and follow to the House of Ana Hickmann, in the city of Itu, SP.

At home, Ana Hickmann shows the mansion and announce thar only 14 girls remain in the competition, and leads to the first challenge: a runway with two looks, which one of them will bring some problem of fashions shows, like stained clothes, wrong mannequins and exchanged measures, broken shoes etc. The girls are divided into 3 groups, and at the end of the runway, the girls meet the judges and 10 girls are eliminated.

- Selected Contestants: Camila Andrade, Eduarda Ferreira, Fátima Correia, Fernanda Gomes, Jessica Nobre, Jessica Vaz, Livia Studart, Luana Reichert, Natália Gomes, Paloma Bicalho, Rafaella Rodrigues, Sancler Frantz, Tamirys Macedo & Viviane Oliveira
- Eliminated: Adriane Scherer, Claudia Liz, Ellen, Giovanna Verissimo, Laiz Gomes, Mayara, Natasha, Priscila Levi, Scarlet Cardoso & Thayssa Ribeiro
- Special Guests: Ticiane Pinheiro, Matheus Mazzafera and Carmen Steffens
- Guests Judges: Dudu Bertholini, Zeca de Abreu, Marcelo Gomes

=== Episode 5 ===
Aired: September 30, 2012

The 14 remaining girls start their day with a lesson on the catwalk with Namie Wihby. He says the girls still need a lot of practice, but some already have the walking acceptable. For the challenge, Ana prepares a play pillow fight, where the girls should overthrow their opponents in a pile of mattresses or at the pool. In the end, the dispute was between Camila and Rafaella, who wins the challenge by throwing Camila at the pool. Camila was very angry because she told to Rafaella that she could not swim. In her defense, Rafaella said that it was a game, and she never plays to lose.

Later, Ana prepares a conversation with the girls, who must answer truthfully why their competitors would not be able to win the competition. This conversation warmed the spirits in the house, creating enmity between Rafaella and Livia.

For the photographic challenge, Ana asks the girls to take off their shirts, to realize a photoshoot in jeans with the presence of male models. Some girls did very well, as Sancler and Eduarda, who showed they are not ashamed of their bodies and have a lot of skill to control them. But some girls had difficulty with the photoshoot as Jessica N., who was uncomfortable with the challenge, and Jessica V., who cared too much about other things, like her hair and the presence of the jurors. Meanwhile, Livia thought it would be disrespectful to her family show up naked on national television, so she decided not to make the challenge.

At the end, Jessica V. and Livia were in the bottom two, and it was the absence of a photo of Livia that made she be eliminated.

- Bottom two: Jessica Vaz & Livia Studart
- Eliminated: Livia Studart

=== Episode 6 ===
Aired: October 7, 2012

- Bottom two: Jessica Vaz & Luana Reichert
- Eliminated: Luana Reichert

=== Episode 7 ===
Aired: October 14, 2012

- First call-out: Eduarda Ferreira
- Bottom three: Jessica Vaz, Nathália Gomes & Tamirys Macedo
- Eliminated: Jessica Vaz & Tamirys Macedo

=== Episode 8 ===
Aired: October 21, 2012

- Bottom three: Fernanda Gomes, Jessica Nobre & Nathália Gomes
- Eliminated: Jessica Nobre & Nathália Gomes

=== Episode 9 ===
Aired: October 28, 2012

- Bottom three: Fátima Correia, Fernanda Gomes & Viviane Oliveira
- Eliminated: Viviane Oliveira

=== Episode 10 ===
Aired: November 4, 2012

- Bottom three: Camila Andrade, Fátima Correia & Fernanda Gomes
- Eliminated: Fátima Correia & Fernanda Gomes

=== Episode 11 ===
Aired: November 11, 2012

- Bottom two: Rafaella Rodrigues & Sancler Frantz
- Eliminated: Rafaella Rodrigues

=== Episode 12 ===
Aired: November 18, 2012

- Bottom two: Camila Andrade & Eduarda Ferreira
- Eliminated: Eduarda Ferreira

=== Live Finale ===
Aired: November 25, 2012

- Final three: Camila Andrade, Paloma Bicalho & Sancler Frantz
- Eliminated: Sancler Frantz
- Final two: Camila Andrade & Paloma Bicalho
- Winner: Camila Andrade

== Contestants ==
(ages stated are at start of contest)

Contestant	Age	Height	Hometown	Finish	Place
Lívia Studart	19	—	Fortaleza	Episode 5	14
Luana Reichert	21	—	Santa Cruz do Sul	Episode 6	13
Tamirys Macedo	20	1.75 m (5 ft 9 in)	São Paulo	Episode 7	12-11
Jéssica Pessoa Vaz	23	—	Fortaleza	Episode 7	12-11
Nathália Gomes	21	—	Porto Alegre	Episode 8	10-9
Jéssica Nobre	21	1.75 m (5 ft 9 in)	Goiânia	Episode 8	10-9
Viviane Oliveira	22	1.71 m (5 ft 7 1/2 in)	Santo André	Episode 9	8
Fernanda Gomes	22	1.74 m (5 ft 8 1/2 in)	Rio de Janeiro	Episode 10	7-6
Fátima Correia	23	1.78 m (5 ft 10 in)	Florianópolis	Episode 10	7-6
Rafaella Rodrigues	23	1.76 m (5 ft 9 1/2 in)	Rio de Janeiro	Episode 11	5
Eduarda Ferreira	19	1.79 m (5 ft 10 1/2 in)	São Paulo	Episode 12	4
Sancler Frantz Konzen	21	1.75 m (5 ft 9 in)	Arroio do Tigre	Episode 13	3
Paloma Moreira Lopes Bicalho	23	1.80 m (5 ft 11 in)	Belo Horizonte	Episode 13	2
Camila Andrade	21	1.78 m (5 ft 10 in)	Fortaleza	Episode 13	1

== Results ==
Place	Model	Episodes								
Place	Model	5	6	7	8	9	10	11	12	13
1	Camila	SAFE	SAFE	SAFE	HIGH	SAFE	LOW	SAFE	LOW	Winner
2	Paloma	SAFE	SAFE	SAFE	HIGH	SAFE	SAFE	SAFE	SAFE	OUT
3	Sancler	SAFE	SAFE	SAFE	SAFE	SAFE	HIGH	LOW	SAFE	OUT
4	Eduarda	SAFE	LOW	HIGH	SAFE	HIGH	SAFE	SAFE	OUT	
5	Rafaella	SAFE	SAFE	HIGH	SAFE	HIGH	HIGH	OUT		
6-7	Fátima	SAFE	LOW	SAFE	HIGH	LOW	OUT			
6-7	Fernanda	SAFE	SAFE	HIGH	LOW	LOW	OUT			
8	Viviane	SAFE	SAFE	SAFE	SAFE	OUT				
9-10	Jéssica N.	LOW	SAFE	SAFE	OUT					
9-10	Nathália	SAFE	LOW	LOW	OUT					
11–12	Jéssica V.	LOW	LOW	OUT						
11–12	Tamirys	SAFE	LOW	OUT						
13	Luana	SAFE	OUT							
14	Lívia	OUT								

The contestant was in danger of elimination
The contestant was in the bottom two
The contestant was eliminated
The contestant was one of the best performers of the week
The contestant won the competition

- In this show, there is no solid call-out order. Only the bottom or top contestants are announced every week with the eliminated girl being pointed out. The rest of the girls progress collectively to the following week.
- Episodes 1, 2 and 3 were casting episodes.
- In Episode 4, the 24 semifinalists were narrowed down to 14 contestants that would move on in the main competition. This first call-out does not reflect on their performance that week.
- In Episode 6, each of the judges had to name two girls who they thought were the weakest. Out of these, Jéssica V. and Luana were pointed out as the bottom two.
- Episode 13 was the live finale.

=== Photo shoot guide ===
- Episodes 1-3 photo shoots: Posing in swimwear (casting)
- Episode 5 photo shoot: Topless with Biotipo jeans
- Episode 6 photo shoot: Swimwear in a meat freezer
- Episode 7 photo shoot & commercial: Underwater glamour; fake top model products
- Episode 8 photo shoot: Leopard print dresses with animals
- Episode 10 photo shoot: Extreme sports
- Episode 11 photo shoot: Body painting
- Episode 12 commercial: Nude commercial
- Episode 13 photo shoots: Swimsuit in Oranjestad; Beauty shots with a neon ring
- In episodes 4 and 9, the shoots were replaced by fashion shows.
