= Ana Hickmann =

Brazilian model

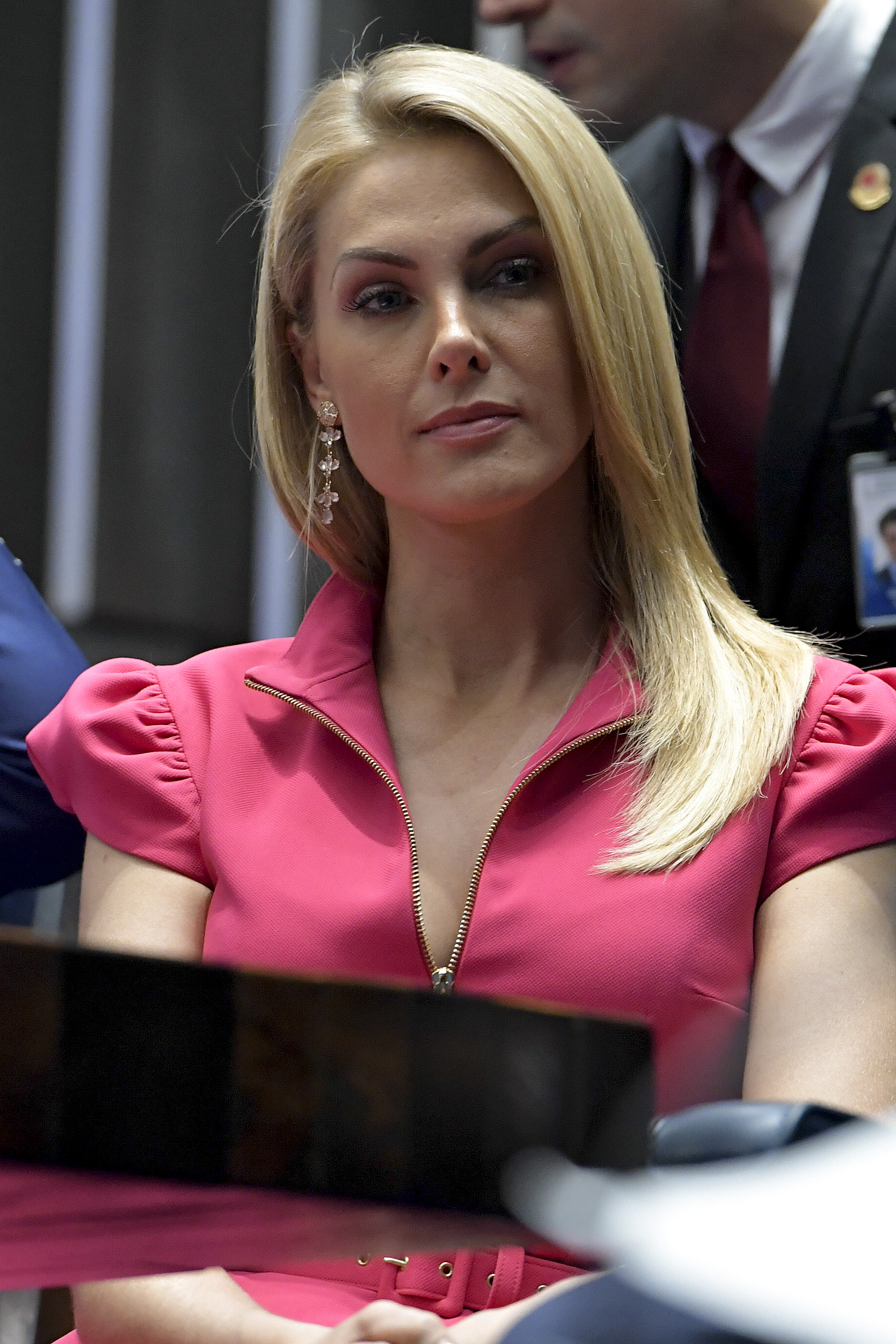
- Hickmann in 2018
- Born: Ana Lúcia Hickmann; 1 March 1981 (age 45); Santa Cruz do Sul, Rio Grande do Sul, Brazil
- Occupations: Television presenter; businesswoman
- Spouse: Alexandre Corrêa (m. 1998; div. 2024)
- Children: 1
- Modeling information
- Height: 1.85 m (6 ft 1 in)
- Hair color: Blonde
- Eye color: Blue
- Agency: 2pm Model Management
- Website: anahickmann.com.br

Ana Lúcia Hickmann (Brazilian Portuguese: [ˈɐ̃nɐ ʁikiˈmɐ̃n]; born 1 March 1981) is a Brazilian television presenter, businesswoman and former model who has worked for Victoria's Secret, Nivea, L'Oreal, Wella, Clairol and Bloomingdales. She has appeared in the South African version of the Sports Illustrated Swimsuit Issue, on the Italian version of GQ, and on the covers of Brazilian Vogue, Marie Claire, and Elle. She currently co-hosts a daytime TV show in Brazil and owns her own clothing, jewellery, cosmetics and accessories brand. Hickmann is also famous for her legs of 120 cm, and was once listed in the Guinness Book of World Records as "the model with the longest legs". She has been named as one of the most beautiful women in the world by GQ Italia in 2001.

== Career ==
=== Modeling ===
As a model, she has starred in advertisements and walked the runway for designers such as Giorgio Armani, Roberto Cavalli, Betsey Johnson, Kenzo, Hanae Mori, Alexandre Herchcovitch, Emanuel Ungaro, Lorenzo Riva, Leonard, Lolita Lempicka, Yves Saint Laurent, Yohji Yamamoto, Neiman Marcus, Schwarzkopf, Gai Mattiolo, La Perla, L'Oréal, Wella, Nivea, Valisere, Cia Marítima, Rosa Chá, Ellus, Cori, Vizzano, Equus Golden Lady, Adidas, Tic Tac, Volkswagen, LG, Sensodyne, Beauty Color, Rommanel, Marcyn, Recco, Britânia, among others.

In 2002, she walked the Victoria's Secret Fashion Show, and also starred in the video "What is Sexy?" directed by Michael Bay.

In June 2004 at the São Paulo Fashion Week, she walked the runway for her own line of animal print bikinis in partnership with the brand Sais de Cor, carrying an Albino Python snake wrapped around her neck. It was Hickmann's idea to walk the runway with the snake.

In 2006, she gave lessons on how to walk like a model for girls from the favela of Heliópolis, in São Paulo, for the fashion show that was held in the community on 27 August, within the social programming that Rede Record network performed in several places of São Paulo named "Dia de Fazer a Diferença" ("Day to Make a Difference"). Hickmann organised two fashion shows for the girls, one with wedding dresses and the other with clothes made by a group of seamstresses from the community of Heliópolis.

In 2005 and 2006, she was the poster-girl and ambassador of the Tic Tac Mega Model, a contest to find new models in Brazil.

On 25 June 2016, she walked the runway for the first time in ten years as a special guest in the closing show of the Angola Fashion Week in Luanda. She walked the runway wearing a dress by Fiu Negru that was made especially for her by the Angolan designer Mariangela Almeida.

=== Entrepreneur ===
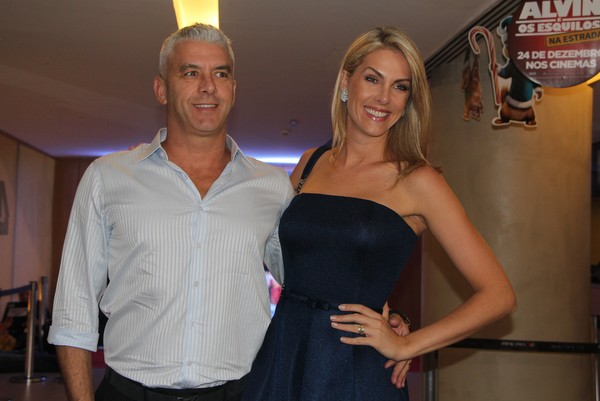
Ana Hickmann and husband Alexandre Corrêa.

Her brand, AH (short for Ana Hickmann), was launched in 2002 and makes R$400 million by year. She currently distributes her own clothing, perfumes, bags, jewellery, watches, shoes, eyeglasses, sunglasses and cosmetics lines, and also manages a photography studio and a DJ agency.

Her line of nail polish sold more than 6 million units in Brazil in 2014. Her eyeglasses brand, Ana Hickmann Eyewear, is sold in over 55 countries between Europe, Asia and the American continent.

In 2013, Hickmann launched her first physical clothing store, Ana Hickmann Outlet, in the neighborhood of Lapa, in São Paulo. In 2016, she launched the store Ana Hickmann Collection in the city of Bauru, in the midwestern region of the state of São Paulo. As of 2017, her brand has six stores in the states of São Paulo and Paraná.

Hickmann launched her YouTube channel on 2 May 2017.

=== TV host ===
In 2004, she accepted the invitation of the Brazilian TV network Rede Record to present a fashion segment in the TV show Tudo a Ver, hosted by journalist Paulo Henrique Amorim. From 2005 to 2009, she co-hosted the daytime TV show "Hoje em Dia" ("Nowadays"), next to Britto Jr and Eduardo Guedes on Rede Record.

In 2009, she started hosting her own TV show, replacing Eliana on Tudo É Possível ("Everything is Possible"), on Sunday afternoons, also on Rede Record. In 2012, she hosted the reality show Top Model, o Reality, which was part of her show Tudo É Possível and inspired by Brazil's Next Top Model and America's Next Top Model, in which 14 models lived with Hickmann in her house in Itu, São Paulo, and the winner would sign a contract with the agency Way Model Management and a contract of R$150,000 to be the face of Ana Hickmann's brand for one year. Hickmann was not a judge on the contest, and she only served the role of a host.

From 2012 to 2014, she co-hosted the daytime TV show Programa da Tarde ("Afternoon Program") on Rede Record, (with Britto Jr and Ticiane Pinheiro). One of the regular guests on her show was the magician Mario Kamia, who performed a range of tricks and illusions. Some of Kamia's illusions involved using Hickmann as his assistant, including dividing her into three in the Zig-Zag Girl and sawing her in half using a Buzz Saw.

Since 2015, she co-hosts Hoje em Dia alongside Celso Zucatelli, Ticiane Pinheiro and Renata Alves.

== Personal life ==
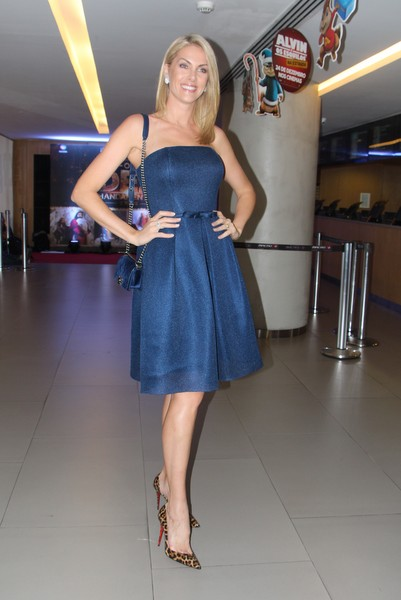
Ana Hickmann in 2016.

Hickmann, who is of German heritage, was once listed in the Guinness Book of World Records as "The model with the longest legs", measuring 46.5 in (118 cm), measured from hip to heel, out of a total height of 73 in. Since 2002, the Guinness Book no longer lists this title. Hickmann has stated that her legs are actually 120 cm long and even measured them on live TV.

Besides her native Portuguese, Hickmann speaks English, German, Italian, French and Spanish.

She was ranked No. 47 and No. 85 on the Maxim Hot 100 Women of 2004, and 2005, respectively.

On 14 February 1998, at age 16, she married former model Alexandre Corrêa. In August 2013 Hickmann announced that she was pregnant with the couple's first child. She gave birth to their son, Alexandre, on 7 March 2014.

On 21 May 2016, Hickmann was a victim of attempted murder when Rodrigo Augusto de Pádua invaded the hotel room where she was and fired at her, her sister-in-law and her brother-in-law. Hickmann was not hit but her sister-in-law took two shots and was hospitalized. The perpetrator, who was a fan of Ana, was shot and killed at the scene.

In November 2023, after an incident of domestic violence, she requested in court a divorce from her husband. The divorce was accepted by the courts in May 2024.

=== Filmography ===
TV
| Year | Title | Office | Note |
|---|---|---|---|
| 2004–2005 | Tudo a Ver | Columnist | |
| 2005–2009 | Hoje em Dia | Presenter | |
| 2006 | Prova de Amor | Herself | Episode: 12 January 2006 |
| 2009 -2012 | Tudo É Possível | Presenter | |
| 2012 | Top Model, o Reality | Presenter | |
| 2012–2015 | Programa da Tarde | Presenter | |
| 2015–present | Hoje em Dia | Presente | |
| 2018 | Bancando o Chef | Participant | Season 1 |
| 2020–present | Hair o reality dos cabelos | Presenter | |

Internet
| Year | Title | Office | Platform |
|---|---|---|---|
| 2017–present | Canal Ana Hickmann | Presenter | YouTube |
