= Brazil's Next Top Model season 3 =

Brazil's Next Top Model
- Season 3
- Season 3 cast
- Presented by: Fernanda Motta
- Judges: Fernanda Motta; Duda Molaino; Dudu Bertholini; Erika Palomino; Paulo Borges
- No. of episodes: 13

Release
- Original network: Sony Entertainment
- Original release: 4 September – 27 November 2008

Season chronology
- ← Previous; Season 2

The third season of Brazil's Next Top Model, a reality show hosted by model Fernanda Motta, was filmed from July to August 2009 and premiered on September 10, 2009. The show aims to find the next top fashion model. The winner received a contract, management, and representation by Ford Models, a photo shoot for the cover and a six-page spread within Gloss magazine, participation in a campaign of C&A and Intimus, an English course in Ireland, a holiday in Paris, France, and a R$100,000 contract with Expor cosmetics.

The season features 13 contestants and the winner was 20-year-old Camila Trindade from Porto Alegre, Rio Grande do Sul.

== Cast ==
=== Contestants ===
(Ages stated are at start of contest)

Contestant	Age	Height	Hometown	Finish	Place
Jéssyca Schamne	18	1.76 m (5 ft 9 1/2 in)	Curitiba	Episode 2	13
Liana Góes	26	1.70 m (5 ft 7 in)	Vancouver, Canada	Episode 3	12
Rafaelly 'Rafa' Xavier	19	1.85 m (6 ft 1 in)	Natal	Episode 4	11
Camila Shiratori	21	1.73 m (5 ft 8 in)	Guarulhos	Episode 5	10
Rafaela Machado	18	1.71 m (5 ft 7 1/2 in)	Santo André	Episode 6	9
Giovahnna Ziegler	18	1.71 m (5 ft 7 1/2 in)	São Paulo	Episode 7	8
Fabiana Teodoro	20	1.72 m (5 ft 7 1/2 in)	São Paulo	Episode 8	7
Julliana Aniceto	19	1.76 m (5 ft 9 1/2 in)	Curitiba	Episode 9	6
Beatriz 'Bia' Fernandes	18	1.75 m (5 ft 9 in)	Brasília	Episode 10	5
Tatiana Domingues	20	1.74 m (5 ft 8 1/2 in)	Rio de Janeiro	Episode 11	4
Mírian Araújo	24	1.77 m (5 ft 9 1/2 in)	Feira de Santana	Episode 13	3
Bruna Brito	21	1.80 m (5 ft 11 in)	Curitiba	Episode 13	2
Camila Trindade	20	1.73 m (5 ft 8 in)	Porto Alegre	Episode 13	1

=== Judges ===
- Fernanda Motta (host)
- Duda Molinos
- Dudu Bertholini
- Erika Palomino

=== Other cast members ===
- Carlos Pazetto
- Namie Wihby

== Episodes ==
No. overall	No. in season	Title	Original release date
26	1	"Episode 1"	17 September 2009
Special guests: Featured photographer:
27	2	"Episode 2"	24 September 2009
Special guests: Featured photographer:
28	3	"Episode 3"	1 October 2009
Special guests: Featured photographer:
29	4	"Episode 4"	8 October 2009
Special guests: Featured photographer:
30	5	"Episode 5"	15 October 2009
Special guests: Featured photographer:
31	6	"Episode 6"	22 October 2009
Special guests: Featured photographer:
32	7	"Episode 7"	29 October 2009
Special guests: Featured photographer:
33	8	"Episode 8"	5 November 2009
Special guests: Featured photographer:
34	9	"Episode 9"	12 November 2009
Special guests: Featured photographer:
35	10	"Episode 10"	19 November 2009
Special guests: Featured photographer:
36	11	"Episode 11"	26 November 2009
Special guests: Featured photographer:
37	12	"Episode 12"	3 December 2009
Special guests: Featured photographer:
38	13	"Episode 13"	10 September 2009
Special guests: Featured photographer:

== Results ==
Order	Episodes												
Order	1 (Note: In episode 1, the group of 20 semi-finalists was reduced to 13 contestants.)	2	3	4	5	6	7	8	9	10	11	13	
1	Mírian	Camila T.	Mírian	Bruna	Bia	Tatiana	Julliana	Bruna	Tatiana	Bruna	Camila T.	Camila T.	Camila T.
2	Camila T.	Camila S.	Giovahnna	Giovahnna	Camila T.	Fabiana	Tatiana	Camila T.	Bruna	Tatiana	Bruna	Bruna	Bruna
3	Giovahnna	Fabiana	Camila T.	Camila S.	Tatiana	Julliana	Mírian	Bia	Bia	Camila T.	Mírian	Mírian	
4	Bia	Bruna	Julliana	Camila T.	Mírian	Mírian	Bia	Mírian	Camila T.	Mírian	Tatiana		
5	Rafaela	Rafaela	Bruna	Julliana	Bruna	Bia	Fabiana	Julliana	Mírian	Bia			
6	Tatiana	Julliana	Rafaela	Mírian	Rafaela	Bruna	Bruna	Tatiana	Julliana				
7	Bruna	Tatiana	Rafa	Bia	Fabiana	Camila T.	Camila T.	Fabiana					
8	Julliana	Giovahnna	Tatiana	Tatiana	Julliana	Giovahnna	Giovahnna						
9	Rafa	Mírian	Fabiana	Rafaela	Giovahnna	Rafaela							
10	Jéssyca	Bia	Bia	Fabiana	Camila S.								
11	Fabiana	Rafa	Camila S.	Rafa									
12	Camila S.	Liana	Liana										
13	Liana	Jéssyca											

The contestant was eliminated
The contestant won the competition
