= List of Drag Race Brasil episodes =

Drag Race Brasil is a Brazilian reality competition series, based on the original American series RuPaul's Drag Race.

== Series overview ==
Season	Episodes	Originally released		
Season	Episodes	First released	Last released	Network
1	12	30 August 2023	14 November 2023	MTV
2	10	10 July 2025	11 September 2025	WOW Presents Plus

== Episodes ==
=== Season 1 (2023) ===
The first season premiered on 30 August 2023.

No. overall	No. in season	Title	Original release date
1	1	"What's Up, Lindas!" "What's up, Lindas!"	30 August 2023
2	2	"Frenemies" "Rinha de Picumãs"	6 September 2023
3	3	"Tupiniquees" "Tupiniqueens"	13 September 2023
4	4	"Atlantic Mermaids" "Sereias do Atlântico"	20 September 2023
5	5	"Glamazonia" "Glamazônia"	27 September 2023
6	6	"Snatch Game - Brasil Season 1" "Snatch Game"	4 October 2023
7	7	"O Brasil ama Puppets!" "Brazil love puppets!"	11 October 2023
8	8	"Extravangância das Festas Brasileiras" "Brazilian Parties Extravaganza"	18 October 2023
9	9	"Drag Shade Brazil" "Drag Shade Brasil"	25 October 2023
10	10	"Carnival Makeover" "Carnaval Makeover"	1 November 2023
11	11	"The Reunion - Brasil Season 1" "Quiprocó Drag"	8 November 2023
12	12	"Grand Finale - Brasil Season 1" "Drag Race Brasil - Grand Finale"	15 November 2023

=== Season 2 (2025) ===
The second season premiered on 10 July 2025.

No. overall	No. in season	Title	Original release date
13	1	"The Birds of Paradise Take Flight"	10 July 2025
14	2	"Paper Cuts"	17 July 2025
15	3	"Brazilian Girl Group Battle Royale"	24 July 2025
16	4	"News Just In..."	31 July 2025
17	5	"Snatched...For the Gods"	7 August 2025
18	6	"Three Courses, One Crown"	14 August 2025
19	7	"Lalaparuza Brasil - Rinha de Picumãs"	21 August 2025
20	8	"Read Bruna to Filth!"	28 August 2025
21	9	"Pin-Up Pairs"	4 September 2025
22	10	"Crowning Glory"	11 September 2025
