= Brazil's Next Top Model season 2 =

Brazil's Next Top Model
- Season 2
- Season 2 cast
- Presented by: Fernanda Motta
- Judges: Fernanda Motta; Duda Molaino; Dudu Bertholini; Erika Palomino; Paulo Borges
- No. of episodes: 13

Release
- Original network: Sony Entertainment
- Original release: 4 September – 27 November 2008

Season chronology
- ← Previous; Season 1 Next → Season 3

The second series of the Brazilian television show Brazil's Next Top Model premiered on September 4, 2008. It was a competition series hosted by Model Fernanda Motta whose goal was to find the next top fashion model. The season featured 13 final contestants and for the first time, the show had an international destination which was Buenos Aires, Argentina.

The winner, 20-year-old Maíra Vieira from Belo Horizonte, Minas Gerais, received a R$200,000 contract, management, and representation by Ford Models, a new car, a photo shoot for the cover, and a six-page spread within Vogue Brazil.

== Cast ==
=== Contestants ===
(Ages stated are at start of contest)

| Contestant | Age | Height | Hometown | Finish | Place |
|---|---|---|---|---|---|
| Luana Caroline | 22 | 1.74 m (5 ft 8 1/2 in) | Rio de Janeiro | Episode 2 | 13 |
| Isabel Correa | 18 | 1.73 m (5 ft 8 in) | Belford Roxo | Episode 3 | 12 |
| Flavia Giussani | 19 | 1.83 m (6 ft 0 in) | Brasília | Episode 4 | 11 |
| Carolline Vieira | 18 | 1.73 m (5 ft 8 in) | Belém | Episode 5 | 10 |
| Flavia Gleichmann | 22 | 1.83 m (6 ft 0 in) | São Paulo | Episode 6 | 9 |
| Rebeca Sampaio | 21 | 1.73 m (5 ft 8 in) | Fortaleza | Episode 7 | 8 |
| Alinne Giacomini | 24 | 1.78 m (5 ft 10 in) | Florianópolis | Episode 8 | 7 |
| Marianna Henud | 18 | 1.73 m (5 ft 8 in) | Rio de Janeiro | Episode 9 | 6 |
| Dayse Lima | 20 | 1.78 m (5 ft 10 in) | Brasília | Episode 10 | 5 |
| Priscila Mallmann | 18 | 1.76 m (5 ft 9 1/2 in) | Armazém | Episode 11 | 4 |
| Malana De Freitas | 20 | 1.78 m (5 ft 10 in) | São Paulo | Episode 12 | 3 |
| Élly Rosa | 19 | 1.79 m (5 ft 10 1/2 in) | Campo Verde | Episode 12 | 2 |
| Maíra Vieira | 20 | 1.76 m (5 ft 9 1/2 in) | Belo Horizonte | Episode 12 | 1 |

=== Judges ===
- Fernanda Motta (host)
- Duda Molainos
- Dudu Bertholini
- Erika Palomino

== Episodes ==
| No. overall | No. in season | Title | Original release date |
|---|---|---|---|
| 13 | 1 | "Episode 1" | 4 September 2008 |
Special guests: Featured photographer:
| 14 | 2 | "Episode 2" | 11 September 2008 |
Special guests: Featured photographer:
| 15 | 3 | "Episode 3" | 18 September 2008 |
Special guests: Featured photographer:
| 16 | 4 | "Episode 4" | 25 September 2008 |
Special guests: Featured photographer:
| 17 | 5 | "Episode 5" | 2 October 2008 |
Special guests: Featured photographer:
| 18 | 6 | "Episode 6" | 9 October 2008 |
Special guests: Featured photographer:
| 19 | 7 | "Episode 7" | 16 October 2008 |
Special guests: Featured photographer:
| 20 | 8 | "Episode 8" | 23 October 2008 |
Special guests: Featured photographer:
| 21 | 9 | "Episode 9" | 30 October 2008 |
Special guests: Featured photographer:
| 22 | 10 | "Episode 10" | 6 November 2008 |
Special guests: Featured photographer:
| 23 | 11 | "Episode 11" | 13 November 2008 |
Special guests: Featured photographer:
| 24 | 12 | "Episode 12" | 20 November 2008 |
Special guests: Featured photographer:
| 25 | 13 | "Episode 13" | 27 November 2008 |
Special guests: Featured photographer:

== Results ==
| Order | Episodes | | | | | | | | | | | | |
| Order | 1 (Note: In episode 1, the group of 20 semi-finalists was reduced to 13 contestants.) | 2 | 3 | 4 | 5 | 6 | 7 | 8 | 9 | 10 | 11 | 12 | |
|---|---|---|---|---|---|---|---|---|---|---|---|---|---|
| 1 | Maíra | Alinne | Flávia Gi. | Malana | Dayse | Maíra | Priscila | Élly | Priscila | Élly | Élly | Maíra | Maíra |
| 2 | Priscila | Élly | Alinne | Élly | Rebeca | Malana | Marianna | Priscila | Maíra | Maíra | Malana | Élly | Élly |
| 3 | Élly | Dayse | Priscila | Priscila | Flavia Gl. | Marianna | Dayse | Maíra | Malana | Malana | Maíra | Malana | |
| 4 | Malana | Flavia Gl. | Flavia Gl. | Carolline | Alinne | Alinne | Malana | Marianna | Élly | Priscila | Priscila | | |
| 5 | Dayse | Marianna | Carolline | Maíra | Élly | Rebeca | Alinne | Dayse | Dayse | Dayse | | | |
| 6 | Isabel | Priscila | Élly | Rebeca | Malana | Élly | Maíra | Malana | Marianna | | | | |
| 7 | Rebeca | Malana | Maíra | Flavia Gl. | Priscila | Dayse | Élly | Alinne | | | | | |
| 8 | Alinne | Flávia Gi. | Malana | Alinne | Maíra | Priscila | Rebeca | | | | | | |
| 9 | Luana | Maíra | Marianna | Dayse | Marianna | Flavia Gl. | | | | | | | |
| 10 | Marianna | Isabel | Dayse | Marianna | Carolline | | | | | | | | |
| 11 | Carolline | Rebeca | Rebeca | Flávia Gi. | | | | | | | | | |
| 12 | Flávia Gi. | Carolline | Isabel | | | | | | | | | | |
| 13 | Flavia Gl. | Luana | | | | | | | | | | | |

The contestant was eliminated
The contestant won the competition
