= Drag Race Brasil season 1 =

2023 season of Drag Race Brasil

Drag Race Brasil
- Season 1
- Promotional poster for season one
- Hosted by: Grag Queen
- Judges: Grag Queen; Bruna Braga; Dudu Bertholini
- No. of contestants: 12
- Winner: Organzza
- Runners-up: Betina Polaroid; Hellena Malditta; Miranda Lebrão
- Miss Congeniality: Aquarela
- No. of episodes: 12

Release
- Original network: MTV / Paramount+ (Brazil); WOW Presents Plus (International)
- Original release: 30 August – 14 November 2023

Season chronology
- Next → Season 2

The first season of Drag Race Brasil premiered on 30 August 2023. The season aired on MTV and Paramount+ in Brazil and Latin America and WOW Presents Plus internationally. The season was confirmed by World of Wonder on 8 August 2022.

The winner of the first season of Drag Race Brasil was Organzza, with Betina Polaroid, Hellena Malditta and Miranda Lebrão as the runners-up. Aquarela was named Miss Congeniality.

== Production ==
Originally in 2017, Endemol Shine Brasil partnered with Passion Distribution, and acquired the production rights to create a Brazilian adaptation of RuPaul's Drag Race. RuPaul was unaware about the upcoming adaptation. Later in 2020, the production company "gave up the rights" for the Brazilian adaptation due to its conservatism in Brazil.

World of Wonder, the production company behind RuPaul's Drag Race, posted three casting calls on social media on 8 August 2022. The casting calls were for new potential Drag Race adaptations in Brazil, Germany, and Mexico. The deadline for the potential competitors was set for 26 August, with the deadline for audition video submission set for 9 September 2022. In December, it was confirmed that the new editions of the Drag Race franchise would premiere "on MTV/Paramount+ in their respective territories."

Grag Queen was confirmed as a host and head judge in July 2023. The other two judges, Bruna Braga and Dudu Bertholini, were confirmed on July 19, as well as the premiere date, which was set for August 30. The cast was revealed on August 2.

== Contestants ==
Ages, names, and cities stated are at time of filming.

Contestants of Drag Race Brasil and their backgrounds
Contestant	Age	Hometown	Outcome
Organzza	30	Rio de Janeiro, Rio de Janeiro	Winner
Betina Polaroid	46	Rio de Janeiro, Rio de Janeiro	Runners-up
Hellena Malditta	23	Salvador, Bahia	Runners-up
Miranda Lebrão	33	Rio de Janeiro, Rio de Janeiro	Runners-up
Shannon Skarllet	25	Piraúba, Minas Gerais	5th place
Naza	22	Monte Santo de Minas, Minas Gerais	6th place
Dallas de Vil	26	Campinas, São Paulo	7th place
Rubi Ocean	30	Brasília, Distrito Federal	8th place
Aquarela	26	Belo Horizonte, Minas Gerais	9th place (Note: Aquarela was voted Miss Congeniality by fellow contestants.)
Melusine Sparkle	26	São José do Rio Preto, São Paulo	10th place
Tristan Soledade	34	Belém, Pará	11th place
Diva More	42	Jaquirana, Rio Grande do Sul	12th place

== Contestant progress ==
Legend:

Organzza won Drag Race Brasil season 1.
Betina Polaroid, Hellena Malditta and Miranda Lebrão were the runners-up.
Aquarela was voted Miss Congeniality (Miss C) by fellow contestants.
WIN indicates that the contestant won the challenge.
SAFE indicates that the contestant was declared safe by the judges.
BTM (Bottom) indicates that the contestant was up for elimination.
ELIM (Eliminated) indicates that the contestant was eliminated.
Guest indicates that the contestant returned as a guest.

Contestants progress with placements in each episode
Contestant	Episode										
Contestant	2	3	4	5	6	7	8	9	10	11	12
Organzza	WIN	WIN	SAFE	SAFE	SAFE	SAFE	SAFE	BTM	WIN	Guest	Winner
Betina Polaroid	BTM	SAFE	SAFE	SAFE	SAFE	SAFE	WIN	WIN	SAFE	Guest	Runner-up
Hellena Malditta	SAFE	SAFE	WIN	SAFE	WIN	SAFE	BTM	SAFE	SAFE	Guest	Runner-up
Miranda Lebrão	SAFE	SAFE	SAFE	SAFE	SAFE	WIN	SAFE	SAFE	BTM	Guest	Runner-up
Shannon Skarllet	SAFE	SAFE	SAFE	WIN	SAFE	BTM	SAFE	BTM	ELIM	Guest	Guest
Naza	SAFE	SAFE	WIN	SAFE	BTM	SAFE	ELIM			Guest	Guest
Dallas de Vil	SAFE	BTM	SAFE	BTM	SAFE	ELIM				Guest	Guest
Rubi Ocean	SAFE	SAFE	SAFE	SAFE	ELIM					Guest	Guest
Aquarela	SAFE	SAFE	BTM	ELIM						Miss C	Guest
Melusine Sparkle	SAFE	SAFE	ELIM							Guest	Guest
Tristan Soledade	SAFE	ELIM								Guest	Guest
Diva More	ELIM									Guest	Guest

== Lip syncs ==
Legend:

The contestant was eliminated after their first time in the bottom.
The contestant was eliminated after their second time in the bottom.
The contestant was eliminated after their third time in the bottom.
The contestant won the Lip Sync for the Crown and was declared the winner of the season.

Episode	Contestants			Song	Eliminated
2	Betina Polaroid	vs.	Diva More	"Bandida" (Pabllo Vittar ft. Pocah)	Diva More
3	Dallas de Vil	vs.	Tristan Soledade	"Cachorrinhas" (Luísa Sonza)	Tristan Soledade
4	Aquarela	vs.	Melusine Sparkle	"Cheguei" (Ludmilla)	Melusine Sparkle
5	Aquarela	vs.	Dallas de Vil	"Vermelho" (Gloria Groove)	Aquarela
6	Naza	vs.	Rubi Ocean	"Shine It On" (Wanessa Camargo)	Rubi Ocean
7	Dallas de Vil	vs.	Shannon Skarllet	"Decadence Avec Elegance" (Deborah Blando)	Dallas de Vil
8	Hellena Malditta	vs.	Naza	"Dois Trabalhos" (Donas)	Naza
9	Organzza	vs.	Shannon Skarllet	"Festa" (Ivete Sangalo)	None
10	Miranda Lebrão	vs.	Shannon Skarllet	"Gueto" (Iza)	Shannon Skarllet
Episode	Finalists			Song	Winner
12	Betina Polaroid vs. Hellena Malditta vs. Miranda Lebrão vs. Organzza			"Envolver" (Anitta)	Organzza

== Guest judges ==
Listed in chronological order:

- Gretchen, singer and dancer
- Flávio Verne, choreographer and director
- Hugo Gloss, multimedia
- Raphael Dumaresq, television personality
- Esse Menino, comedian
- Kéfera Buchmann, actress and YouTuber
- Maria Casadevall, actress
- Bruna Linzmeyer, actress
- Júnior Chicó, comedian
- Mauro Sousa, actor, musician and social media personality

=== Special guests ===
Guests who appeared in episodes, but did not judge on the main stage.

Episode 6 and 8

- Walter Gomez, photographer

Episode 10

- Koichi Sonoda, makeup artist
- Norvina, president of Anastasia Beverly Hills

Episode 12

- Bruno Alcântara, member of the Pit Crew on RuPaul's Drag Race

== Episodes ==
No. overall	No. in season	Title	Original release date
1	1	"What's Up, Lindas!" "What's up, Lindas!"	30 August 2023
Six new queens enter the workroom for the first part of the season's split premiere. For the first challenge, the queens write, record, and perform verses and choreograph a music video to "Festa com Mozão" (Party with Bae). On the runway, category is Minhas Raízes (My Roots). After the judges' critiques, the remaining six queens enter the workroom.: Guest Judge: Gretchen; Main Challenge: Write, record, perform verses and choreograph a music video to "Festa com Mozão" (Party with Bae); Runway Theme: Minhas Raízes (My Roots)
2	2	"Frenemies" "Rinha de Picumãs"	6 September 2023
For this week's main challenge, the remaining six queens write, record, and perform verses and choreograph a music video to "Madrugatas" (Hotties of the Night). On the runway, category is Minhas Raízes (My Roots). Dallas de Vil, Hellena Malditta, Organzza, Rubi Ocean, Shannon Skarllet and Tristan Soledade are the winning team, with Organzza winning the challenge. Aquarela, Betina Polaroid, Diva More, Melusine Sparkle, Miranda Lebrão and Naza are the losing team. Betina Polaroid, Diva More and Miranda Lebrão receive negative critiques, with Miranda Lebrão being safe. Betina Polaroid and Diva More lip-sync to "Bandida" by Pabllo Vittar ft. Pocah. Betina Polaroid wins the lip-sync and Diva More is the first queen to sashay away.: Guest Judge: Flávio Verne; Main Challenge: Write, record, perform verses and choreograph a music video to "Madrugatas" (Hotties of the Night); Runway Theme: Minhas Raízes (My Roots); Challenge Winner: Organzza; Challenge Prize: A R$5,000 cash tip; Bottom Two: Betina Polaroid and Diva More; Lip-Sync Song: "Bandida" by Pabllo Vittar ft. Pocah; Eliminated: Diva More; Farewell Message: "MANAS SEJAM AMAVÉIS E GENTIS UMAS COM AS OUTRAS. PQ TEM BOLO P/ TODAS 💋 DIVA MORE" ("GIRLS BE LOVEABLE AND GENTLE TO EACH OTHER. BECAUSE THERE'S CAKE FOR EVERYONE 💋 DIVA MORE")
3	3	"Tupiniquees" "Tupiniqueens"	13 September 2023
For this week's mini-challenge, the queens compete in the Miss Drag Race Brasil pageant. Dallas de Vil wins the mini-challenge. For the main challenge, the queens act in a sketch "As Chuteiras de Trovão" (Trovão's Soccer Shoes).: Aquarela plays Caramelo; Betina Polaroid plays Gangan; Dallas de Vil plays Natasha Molinete; Hellena Malditta plays Blond Babalu; Melusine Sparkle plays Alicinha; Miranda Lebrão plays Dr. Jezebel; Naza plays Beicinha; Organzza plays Sugar Baby Brown; Rubi Ocean plays Emanuele Viscaia; Shannon Skarlett plays Jonelson Trovão; Tristan Soledade plays Lituânia; On the runway, category is Tupiniqueens (Brazilian Top Models). Hellena Malditta, Miranda Lebrão and Organzza receive positive critiques, with Organzza winning the challenge. Betina Polaroid, Dallas de Vil and Tristan Soledade receive negative critiques, with Betina Polaroid being safe. Dallas de Vil and Tristan Soledade lip-sync to "Cachorrinhas" by Luísa Sonza. Dallas de Vil wins the lip-sync and Tristan Soledade sashays away.: Guest Judge: Hugo Gloss; Mini-Challenge: Compete in the Miss Drag Race Brazil pageant; Mini-Challenge Winner: Dallas de Vil; Mini-Challenge Prize: A R$5,000 cash tip; Main Challenge: Act in the sketch "As Chuteiras de Trovão" (Trovão's Soccer Shoes); Runway Theme: Top Models Tupiniqueens (Brazilian Top Models); Challenge Winner: Organzza; Bottom Two: Dallas de Vil and Tristan Soledade; Lip-Sync Song: "Cachorrinhas" by Luísa Sonza; Eliminated: Tristan Soledade; Farewell Message: "FELIZ ENCONTRO FELIZ PARTIDA PARA UM FELIZ REENCONTRO ♡ CONEXÃO BELÉM - RIO TRISTAN SOLEDADE" ("HAPPY MEETING HAPPY LEAVING FOR A HAPPY REUNION ♡ CONNECTION BELÉM - RIO TRISTAN SOLEDADE")
4	4	"Atlantic Mermaids" "Sereias do Atlântico"	20 September 2023
For this week's mini-challenge, the queens read each other to filth. Betina Polaroid wins the mini-challenge. For the main challenge, the queens create a mermaid look from unconventional materials. On the runway, category is Sereias do Atlântico (Mermaids of the Atlantic Ocean). Hellena Malditta, Naza and Rubi Ocean receive positive critiques, with Hellena Malditta and Naza both winning the challenge. Aquarela, Dallas de Vil and Melusine Sparkle receive negative critiques, with Dallas de Vil being safe. Aquarela and Melusine Sparkle lip-sync to "Cheguei" by Ludmilla. Aquarela wins the lip-sync and Melusine Sparkle sashays away.: Guest Judge: Raphael Dumaresq; Mini-Challenge: Reading is Fundamental; Mini-Challenge Winner: Betina Polaroid; Mini-Challenge Prize: A R$5,000 cash tip; Main Challenge: Create a mermaid look made from unconventional materials; Runway Theme: Sereias do Atlântico (Mermaids of the Atlantic Ocean); Challenge Winners: Hellena Malditta and Naza; Bottom Two: Aquarela and Melusine Sparkle; Lip-Sync Song: "Cheguei" by Ludmilla; Eliminated: Melusine Sparkle; Farewell Message: "♡ Sentimentos não são fatos ♡ Sejam sempre luz ♡ Melusine ♡" ("♡ Feelings are not facts ♡ Always be the light ♡ Melusine ♡")
5	5	"Glamazonia" "Glamazônia"	27 September 2023
For this week's mini-challenge, the queens get into quick drag and decorate a drag wedding cake in five minutes. Betina Polaroid and Hellena Malditta win the mini-challenge. For the main challenge, the queens create a 30-second campaign with the theme "Você Não Está Só" (You Are Not Alone). On the runway, category is Glamazônia (Glamazonia). Miranda Lebrão, Organzza and Shannon Skarllet receive positive critiques, with Shannon Skarllet winning the challenge. Aquarela, Dallas de Vil and Rubi Ocean receive negative critiques, with Rubi Ocean being safe. Aquarela and Dallas de Vil lip-sync to "Vermelho" by Gloria Groove. Dallas de Vil wins the lip-sync and Aquarela sashays away.: Guest Judge: Esse Menino; Mini-Challenge: Get into quick drag and decorate a drag wedding cake in five minutes; Mini-Challenge Winners: Betina Polaroid and Hellena Malditta; Mini-Challenge Prize: A R$2,500 cash tip; Main Challenge: Create a 30-second campaign with the theme "Você Não Está Só" (You Are Not Alone); Runway Theme: Glamazônia (Glamazon); Challenge Winner: Shannon Skarllet; Bottom Two: Aquarela and Dallas de Vil; Lip-Sync Song: "Vermelho" by Gloria Groove; Eliminated: Aquarela; Farewell Message: "MAIS UMA INJUSTIÇA FOI FEITA! TINTASS SERÃO DERRAMADAS =( NAZA GANHA ESSA PALHAÇADA 🤡 OBRIGADA PELA IRMANDADE, MENINAS! ("AN INJUSTICE HAS BEEN DONE! INKPAINTS WILL BE SPILLED =( NAZA WIN THIS MESS 🤡 THANK YOU FOR THE SISTERHOOD, GIRLS!")
6	6	"Snatch Game - Brasil Season 1" "Snatch Game"	4 October 2023
For this week's mini-challenge, the queens do a Grávida de Taubaté inspired photoshoot. Miranda Lebrão wins the mini-challenge. For the main challenge, the queens play the Snatch Game. Bruna Braga and Dudu Bertholini star as the celebrity contestants. The cast consists of: Betina Polaroid as Regina Rouca; Dallas de Vil as Dilma Rousseff; Helena Malditta as Narcisa Tamborindeguy; Miranda Lebrão as Paola Carosella; Naza as Márcia Sensitiva; Organzza as Maria Bethânia; Rubi Ocean as Marília Gabriela; Shannon Skarllet as Inês Brasil; On the runway, category is Filhas de Carmen (Daughters of Carmen). Dallas de Vil, Hellena Malditta and Miranda Lebrão receive positive critiques, with Hellena Malditta winning the challenge. Naza, Rubi Ocean and Shannon Skarllet receive negative critiques, with Shannon Skarllet being safe. Naza and Rubi Ocean lip-sync to "Shine It On" by Wanessa Camargo. Naza wins the lip-sync and Rubi Ocean sashays away.: Guest Judge: Kéfera Buchmann; Mini-Challenge: Grávida de Taubaté inspired photoshoot; Mini-Challenge Winner: Miranda Lebrão; Mini-Challenge Prize: A R$5,000 cash tip; Main Challenge: Snatch Game; Runway Theme: Filhas de Carmen (Daughters of Carmen); Challenge Winner: Hellena Malditta; Bottom Two: Naza and Rubi Ocean; Lip-Sync Song: "Shine It On" by Wanessa Camargo; Eliminated: Rubi Ocean; Farewell Message: "Cada uma de vocês é uma joia rara. Bjs, Rubi! Até logo" ("Each one of you is a rare jewel. Kisses, Rubi! See you later")
7	7	"O Brasil ama Puppets!" "Brazil love puppets!"	11 October 2023
For this week's mini-challenge, the queens impersonate each other with puppets. Miranda Lebrão wins the mini-challenge. For the main challenge, the queens present two looks on the runway: Black and White. On the runway, Betina Polaroid, Miranda Lebrão and Organzza receive positive critiques, with Miranda Lebrão winning the challenge. Dallas de Vil, Hellena Malditta and Shannon Skarllet receive negative critiques, with Hellena Malditta being safe. Dallas de Vil and Shannon Skarllet lip-sync to "Decadence Avec Elegance" by Deborah Blando. Shannon Skarllet wins the lip-sync and Dallas de Vil sashays away.: Guest Judge: Maria Casadevall; Mini-Challenge: Everybody Loves Puppets; Mini-Challenge Winner: Miranda Lebrão; Mini-Challenge Prize: A R$5,000 cash tip; Main Challenge: Present two looks on the runway; Runway Themes: Black and White; Challenge Winner: Miranda Lebrão; Bottom Two: Dallas de Vil and Shannon Skarllet; Lip-Sync Song: "Decadence Avec Elegance" by Deborah Blando; Eliminated: Dallas de Vil; Farewell Message: "Cada porta de saída também é uma porta de entrada." - Dilmãe. Somos todas estrelas! Ouçam com o coração, juntas somos revolução ☭☆ Até o futuro! ♡" ("Every exit door is also an entry door." - Dilmãe. We are all stars! Listen with your heart, together we are revolution ☭ ☆ See you in the future! ♡")
8	8	"Extravangância das Festas Brasileiras" "Brazilian Parties Extravaganza"	18 October 2023
For this week's mini-challenge, the queens pose as tourists in front of the Iguazu Falls. Shannon Skarllet wins the mini-challenge. For the main challenge, the queens present three looks for The Brazilian Festivals Ball: Maracatu, Festival de Parintins (Parintins Festival) and Bate-bola. On the runway, Betina Polaroid, Organzza and Shannon Skarllet receive positive critiques, with Betina Polaroid winning the challenge. Hellena Malditta, Miranda Lebrão and Naza receive negative critiques, with Miranda Lebrão being safe. Hellena Malditta and Naza lip-sync to "Dois Trabalhos" by Donas. Hellena Malditta wins the lip-sync and Naza sashays away.: Guest Judge: Bruna Linzmeyer; Mini-Challenge: Photoshoot posing as tourists in front of the Iguazu Falls; Mini-Challenge Winner: Shannon Skarllet; Mini-Challenge Prize: A R$5,000 cash tip; Main Challenge: The Brazilian Festivals Ball; Runway Themes: Maracatu, Festival de Parintins (Parintins Festival) and Bate-bola; Challenge Winner: Betina Polaroid; Bottom Two: Hellena Malditta and Naza; Lip-Sync Song: "Dois Trabalhos" by Donas; Eliminated: Naza; Farewell Message: "🚀 ✨ A NAZA ATERRISSOU NESSA TERRA DE ESTRELAS E AGORA PARTE EM UM COMETA PARA OUTRO MUNDO DE SUCESSO Espero ver todas vocês ♡ LÁ ♡" ("🚀 ✨ NAZA ATERRISED IN THIS LAND OF STARS AND IS NOW LEAVING ON A COMETTE TO ANOTHER WORLD OF SUCCESS I look forward to seeing you all ♡ THERE ♡")
9	9	"Drag Shade Brazil" "Drag Shade Brasil"	25 October 2023
For this week's mini-challenge, the queens do a makeup look of an assigned animal without mirrors. Shannon Skarllet wins the mini-challenge. For the main challenge, the queens perform a roast of the judges and fellow queens. On the runway, category is Glitter Glam. Betina Polaroid and Miranda Lebrão receive positive critiques, with Betina Polaroid winning the challenge. Hellena Malditta, Organzza and Shannon Skarllet receive negative critiques, with Hellena Malditta being safe. Organzza and Shannon Skarllet lip-sync to "Festa" by Ivete Sangalo. Both queens win the lip-sync and no one goes home.: Guest Judge: Júnior Chicó; Mini-Challenge: Do a makeup look of an assigned animal without mirrors; Mini-Challenge Winner: Shannon Skarllet; Mini-Challenge Prize: A R$5,000 cash tip; Main Challenge: Perform a roast of the judges and fellow queens; Runway Theme: Glitter Glam; Challenge Winner: Betina Polaroid; Bottom Two: Organzza and Shannon Skarllet; Lip-Sync Song: "Festa" by Ivete Sangalo; Eliminated: None
10	10	"Carnival Makeover" "Carnaval Makeover"	1 November 2023
For this week's main challenge, the queens make over Drag Race superfans. On the runway, category is Carnaval Makeover (Carnival Makeover). Hellena Malditta and Organzza receive positive critiques, with Organzza winning the challenge. Miranda Lebrão and Shannon Skarllet receive negative critiques, and are announced as the bottom two. They lip-sync to "Gueto" by Iza. Miranda Lebrão wins the lip-sync and Shannon Skarllet sashays away.: Guest Judge: Mauro Sousa; Main Challenge: Makeover Drag Race superfans; Runway Theme: Carnaval Makeover (Carnival Makeover); Challenge Winner: Organzza; Bottom Two: Miranda Lebrão and Shannon Skarllet; Lip-Sync Song: "Gueto" by Iza; Eliminated: Shannon Skarllet; Farewell Message: "Não tem babado. Estou indo feliz e levando todas no meu coração. Não tem babado, Caralho!!! ♡ Amo você 💋 Te amo ganha PFV ♡" ("No frills. I'm going happily and taking you all in my heart. No fucking frills!!! ♡ I love you 💋 I love you win PLS ♡")
11	11	"The Reunion - Brasil Season 1" "Quiprocó Drag"	8 November 2023
The queens all return for the reunion. Discussions include: The alliance of the Rio de Janeiro queens, Diva More's fake news regarding her, Tristan Soledade not knowing the words during her lip-sync, Aquarela feeling robbed after her elimination, Rubi Ocean's performance in the Snatch Game, Dallas de Vil's trajectory during the season, Naza's beard, Hellena Malditta's HIV status, and Melusine Sparkle, Organzza and Shannon Skarllet talk about bullying and rooting for someone during lip-syncs and how it affected Diva More. It is then announced that Aquarela is this season's Miss Congeniality.: Miss Congeniality: Aquarela
12	12	"Grand Finale - Brasil Season 1" "Drag Race Brasil - Grand Finale"	15 November 2023
For the final challenge of the season, the queens star and perform in a music video for Grag Queen's song "Party Everyday". On the runway, category is Meu Melhor Look Drag (My Best Drag Look). The eliminated queens all return to the runway. The four finalists are told that they will be lip-syncing to "Envolver" by Anitta. It is announced that Organzza is the winner, leaving Betina Polaroid, Hellena Malditta and Miranda Lebrão as the runners-up.: Main Challenge: Star and perform in a music video for Grag Queen's song "Party Everyday"; Runway Theme: Meu Melhor Look Drag (My Best Drag Look); Lip-Sync Song: "Envolver" by Anitta; Runners-up: Betina Polaroid, Hellena Malditta and Miranda Lebrão; Winner of Drag Race Brasil Season One: Organzza
