= Brazil's Next Top Model =

- Genre: Reality television
- Created by: Tyra Banks
- Presented by: Fernanda Motta
- Judges: Fernanda Motta (1-3); Erika Palomino (1-3); Duda Molinos (2-3); Dudu Bertholini (2-3); Alexandre Herchcovitch (1); Paulo Borges (1)
- Country of origin: Brazil
- No. of seasons: 3
- No. of episodes: 38

Production
- Running time: 60 mins

Original release
- Network: Sony Entertainment Television
- Release: 3 October 2007 – 3 December 2009

Brazil's Next Top Model (often abbreviated as BrNTM) is a Brazilian reality television series based on Tyra Banks' America's Next Top Model. The series began airing in October 2007 on Sony Entertainment Television. It was produced by the Brazilian branch of Sony Entertainment Television in association with Moonshot Pictures. The series enjoyed three seasons until its cancellation in 2009.

== History ==
In early 2007, Sony Entertainment Television announced plans that for a Brazilian adaptation of the reality TV series created and produced by Tyra Banks in the United States.

One of the production decisions leading up to the show that caught the most media attention was the selection of the Brazilian model who would play the role belonging to Banks in the original adaptation. The channel's first choice was originally Brazilian model Gisele Bündchen, though the network later settled on Fernanda Motta for the position.

The application process for the show's first season took place during July 2007. Filming for the inaugural season began on 19 August, and the show premiered on 3 October of the same year.

The panel of judges for the first season consisted of Motta, journalist Erika Palomino, photographer Paulo Borges, and designer Alexandre Herchcovitch. The show's first winner, 19 year-old Mariana Velho from Santos, was crowned on 17 December 2007.

Work for a fourth season did not continue after 2009. RecordTV later re-branded the show under a new title, Top Model, o Reality, in 2012, though the new adaptation was only loosely based on the original Top Model format. The new show ceased production after the airing of its first season.

== Format ==
The show followed the format of the original adaptation very closely, though producers of the show stated that the general approach to the candidates would involve "less cruelty" in comparison to the example set by Banks. Episodes were divided into segments that more or less consisted of a fashion lesson, followed by a challenge and photo shoot, and ending in the elimination of a contestant at the end of each week. Each season began with a pool of about 20 semi-finalists, from which 13 finalists would be chosen at the end of the first episode. With the exception of the series' second season, the show did not schedule visits to an international destination, opting to visit local destinations in the country instead.

== Seasons ==
Season	Premiere date	Winner	Runner-up	Other contestants in order of elimination	Number of contestants	Destinations
1	3 October 2007	Mariana Velho	Ana Paula Bertola	Dandara Oliveira, Danielle Zimmermann, Isabella Chaves, Anne Wrobel, Andrea Medina, Érycka Martins, Karin Cavalli, Lana Sartin Silva, Ana Paula Costa, Mariana Richardt, Lívia Maria Senador	13	None
2	4 September 2008	Maíra Vieira	Élly Rosa	Luana Caroline, Isabel Correa, Flávia Giussani, Carolline Vieira, Flavia Gleichmann, Rebeca Sampaio, Alinne Giacomini, Marianna Henud, Dayse Lima, Priscila Mallmann, Malana de Freitas	13	Buenos Aires
3	10 September 2009	Camila Trindade	Bruna Brito	Jéssyca Schamne, Liana Góes, Rafa Xavier, Camila Shiratori, Rafaela Machado, Giovahnna Ziegler, Fabiana Teodoro, Julliana Aniceto, Bia Fernandes, Tatiana Domingues, Mírian Araújo	13	None
