= Simulated pregnancy =

Deliberate attempt to create fake impression of pregnancy

A simulated pregnancy is a deliberate attempt to create the impression of pregnancy. It should not be confused with false pregnancy, where a person mistakenly believes that they are pregnant.

The Taubaté pregnancy hoax is a notable example of a simulated pregnancy that happened in Brazil in 2012.

== Techniques ==
People who wish to look pregnant, generally for social, sexual, psychological or entertainment purposes, have the option of body suits and the like to wear under their clothes. It can be done by using pillows or pads, or light-weighing, small balls with a round shape to simulate a pregnant abdomen.

== See also ==
- Couvade syndrome
