= Top Model, o Reality =

- Judges: Ana Hickmann, Ticiane Pinheiro, Zeca de Abreu, Gustavo Sardi, Matheus Mazzafera, Dudu Bertholini, Namie Wihby
- Country of origin: Brazil
- No. of episodes: 13

Production
- Running time: 60 minutes

Original release
- Network: Rede Record
- Release: 2 September – 25 November 2012

Top Model, o Reality (or Top Model, the Reality) is a Brazilian reality TV series.

The show was hosted by Ana Hickmann and co-hosted by Ticiane Pinheiro during casting weeks. Season one first aired on 2 September 2012 and featured 24 semi-finalists.

Initially, the show was designed to be a part of Ana Hickmann's television show called Tudo é Possivel, but was later made into an independent show. For this new version, the show was re-formatted in order to be more appealing to the Brazilian public. Casting became four episodes long, and the finale of the series was shot live. The models lived with Ana Hickmann in her house in Itu, São Paulo. Ana was not a judge on the panel, and she only served the role of a host. The judges that were present at panel for elimination change every week.

== Cycles ==
Cycle	Premiere date	Winner	Runner-up	Other contestants in order of elimination	Number of contestants	International Destinations
1	2 September 2012	Camila Andrade	Paloma Bicalho	Livia Studart, Luana Reichert, Tamirys Macedo & Jessica Pessoa Vaz, Nathália Gomes & Jessica Nobre, Viviane Oliveira, Fernanda Gomes & Fátima Correia, Rafaela Rodrigues, Eduarda Ferreira, Sancler Frantz	14	Oranjestad
