= Drag Race Brasil =

Brazilian reality competition television series

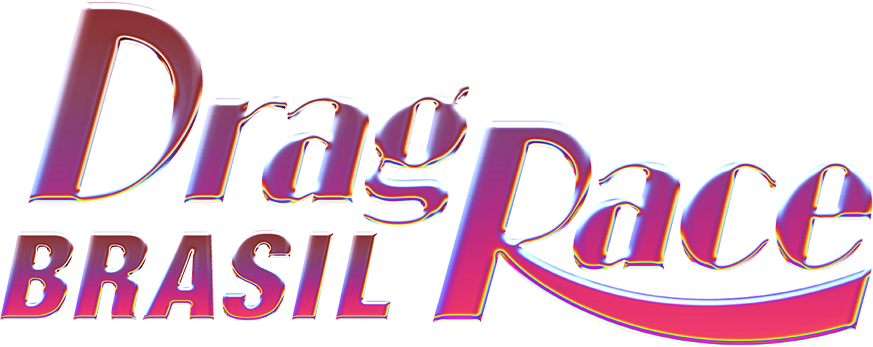
- Genre: Reality competition
- Based on: RuPaul's Drag Race
- Presented by: Grag Queen
- Judges: Grag Queen; Bruna Braga; Dudu Bertholini
- Opening theme: RuPaul's Drag Race Theme
- Ending theme: Rock It (To the Moon)
- Country of origin: Brazil
- Original language: Portuguese
- No. of seasons: 2
- No. of episodes: 22 (list of episodes)

Production
- Executive producers: RuPaul Charles; Tom Campbell; Fenton Bailey; Randy Barbato
- Camera setup: Multi-camera
- Production companies: MTV Entertainment Studios; World of Wonder

Original release
- Network: MTV and Paramount+ (Brazil s. 1); WOW Presents Plus (International s. 1, Global s. 2–)
- Release: 30 August 2023 – present

Drag Race Brasil is a Brazilian reality competition series, based on the original American series RuPaul's Drag Race. The series is broadcast on WOW Presents Plus globally. The first season was broadcast on MTV and Paramount+ in Brazil. It is the fourteenth international adaptation of the American reality competition series RuPaul's Drag Race.

== Production ==
Originally in 2017, Endemol Shine Brasil partnered with Passion Distribution, and acquired the production rights to create a Brazilian adaptation of RuPaul's Drag Race. RuPaul was unaware about the upcoming adaptation. Later in 2020, the production company "gave up the rights" for the Brazilian adaptation due to its conservatism in Brazil.

World of Wonder, the production company behind RuPaul's Drag Race, posted three casting calls on social media on 8 August 2022. The casting calls were for new potential Drag Race adaptations in Brazil, Germany, and Mexico. The deadline for the potential competitors was set for 26 August, with the deadline for audition video submission set for 9 September 2022. In December, it was confirmed that the new editions of the Drag Race franchise will premiere "on MTV/Paramount+ in their respective territories."

Grag Queen was confirmed as a host and head judge in July 2023. The other two judges, Bruna Braga and Dudu Bertholini, were confirmed on July 19, as well as the premiere date, which was set for August 30. The cast was revealed on August 2.

== Series overview ==
Season	Contestants	Episodes	Originally released			Winner	Runner(s)-up	Miss Congeniality
Season	Contestants	Episodes	First released	Last released	Network	Winner	Runner(s)-up	Miss Congeniality
1	12	12	30 August 2023	14 November 2023	MTV; Paramount+	Organzza	Betina Polaroid; Hellena Malditta; Miranda Lebrão	Aquarela
2	10	10	10 July 2025	11 September 2025	WOW Presents Plus	Ruby Nox	Mellody Queen	-

=== Season 1 (2023) ===
The first season of Drag Race Brasil premiered on 30 August 2023. The season aired on MTV and Paramount+ in Brazil and Latin America and WOW Presents Plus internationally.

The winner of the first season of Drag Race Brasil was Organzza, with Betina Polaroid, Hellena Malditta and Miranda Lebrão as the runners-up. Aquarela was named Miss Congeniality.

=== Season 2 (2025) ===
The second season premiered on 10 July 2025 on WOW Presents Plus.

The winner of the second season of Drag Race Brasil was Ruby Nox, with Mellody Queen as the runner-up.
