= Miranda Lebrão =

Brazilian drag performer (born 1989)

- Born: 1988 or 1989 (age 36–37)
- Television: Drag Race Brasil (season 1); RuPaul's Drag Race Global All Stars

Miranda Lebrão is a Brazilian drag performer and visual artist who competed on the first season of Drag Race Brasil as well as RuPaul's Drag Race Global All Stars.

== Career ==
Drag performer and visual artist Miranda Lebrão was a runner-up on the first season of Drag Race Brasil. She won one maxi challenge. She later competed on RuPaul's Drag Race Global All Stars (2024). She performed a trapeze act for the talent show.

== Personal life ==
Miranda Lebrão was born in Rio de Janeiro and has a background in naval engineering and acting. During their upbringing, none of Miranda Lebrão's family members supported their artistic passions. As a child, Miranda Lebrão was a victim of parental abuse and conversion therapy. In 1997, Miranda Lebrão landed a recurring role in the Brazilian version of the TV series Chiquititas. However, their mother was pregnant at the time and their family could not move to Argentina, so the opportunity fell through.

== Filmography ==
Year	Title	Role	Notes	Ref
2023	Drag Race Brasil	Herself	Contestant (season 1) - Runner-up	
2024	RuPaul's Drag Race Global All Stars	Herself	Contestant - 11th place	

== See also ==
- List of people from Rio de Janeiro
