= Organzza =

Brazilian drag performer and visual artist

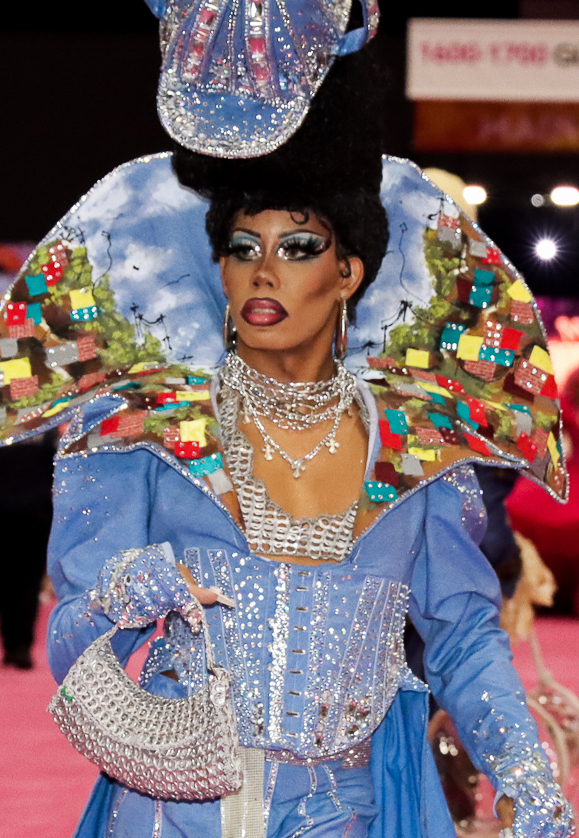
- Organzza at RuPaul's DragCon LA, 2024
- Born: Vinícius Andrade; 1991 or 1992 (age 32–33); Coelho Neto, Rio de Janeiro, Brazil
- Occupation: Drag queen

Organzza is the stage name of Vinícius Andrade (born 1991 or 1992), a Brazilian drag performer and visual artist who won the first season of Drag Race Brasil.

== Early life ==
Andrade was born and raised in Coelho Neto.

== Career ==
Organzza won the first season of Drag Race Brasil. She won three challenges during the competition.
