= Maíra Vieira =

Brazilian model

- Born: October 13, 1988 (age 37); Belo Horizonte, Brazil
- Modeling information
- Height: 1.76 m (5 ft 9 1/2 in)
- Hair color: Brown
- Eye color: Green
- Agency: Ford Models

Maíra Vieira is a Brazilian model and winner of the second season of the reality show Brazil's Next Top Model.

== Biography ==
The daughter of a former model, Maíra Vieira was born on October 12, 1988, in Belo Horizonte, Minas Gerais. She was invited to work for a modelling agency for the first time at age 12, but her parents refused to give their permission, because they felt she was too young for the fashion world at the time. During adolescence, she suffered discrimination for being tall and lean.

After finishing high school and studying law for a year, Vieira went to work for a small mining company. During a conversation with friends, Maíra was told of the casting of Channel Sony´s reality show, Brazil's Next Top Model.

== Brazil's Next Top Model ==
Vieira was praised for her catwalk during the first week of casting, and was selected for the Top 13.

In the first part of the show, Vieira was criticized for her lack of presence in photos. But in week 6, she had the best photo of the week, and continued to do well from then on. In the 11th week, her potential was assessed during a trip to the Buenos Aires Fashion Week. Despite receiving praise from booker Gabriela Vidal and designer Pablo Ramirez, she ended in the bottom two for the first time, along with candidate Priscila Mallmann, but was saved from elimination.

In the final episode, she was pitted against Élly Rosa. Rosa had the better catwalk, but Vieira's improvement, good personality, good photos, and high fashion looks resulted in her being crowned as the eventual victor.

== Later career ==
As part of her prize, Maíra had her portfolio made available on the official website Ford of Minas Gerais from December 2008. She was also featured in an editorial in Vogue Brazil, and, within six months of her victory, had worked for major brands and designers, including Rosa Chá, Carlos Mielle, and Jo De Mer.

In December 2008, Maíra walked for Rosa Chá as part of the final runway show of the twelfth season of reality show America's Next Top Model. In 2009, Vieira was a catwalk model in São Paulo Fashion Week.
