= Christine Yufon =

Chinese-Brazilian model and artist

Christine Yufon (January 18, 1923 – January 7, 2024) was a Chinese-French-Brazilian model, businesswoman, and artist.

== Biography ==
Christine Yufon was born in Beijing in 1923. As a child, she studied at an American school in China.

In 1947, she married the French engineer Georges Constant Collet. The couple lived in Shanghai until the city was taken over by the Communists in 1949, when they had to leave for Paris. Their property, including farmland and a cigarette factory, was seized by the new Chinese government, and she left behind her family's art collection.

From France, Yufon migrated to Brazil in 1951, settling in the São Paulo neighborhood of Higienópolis. It was there that her modeling career began, when the social columnist and future nightclub magnate Ricardo Amaral convinced her participate in a grand ball in São Paulo. Yufon worked as a model for the old Casa Vogue and became a muse for the French designer Jacques Heim. She was one of Brazil's first Asian models. Then, in the 1960s, she founded her pioneering etiquette school, which taught posture, philosophy, and values to the general public as well as politicians, artists, and members of high society.

In the 1970s, she worked with Angioleta Miroglio-Cattani to promote artists and jewelers through their gallery, Miroglio & Yufon. Over the years, she began to produce sculpture herself, which was exhibited in various venues including the São Paulo Museum of Art in the 1980s. Her work, in bronze, wood, and stone, was inspired by her youth in China. At the invitation of the Chinese government, in the late 1980s, she presented her work in her homeland. Her sculptural practice evolved into producing pieces of jewelry and "wearable art."

Yufon continued modeling in her later years, serving as a muse for the designer Dudu Bertholini. She died in São Paulo, at age 100, in 2024.
