= Lorenzo Riva =

Italian fashion designer (1938–2023)

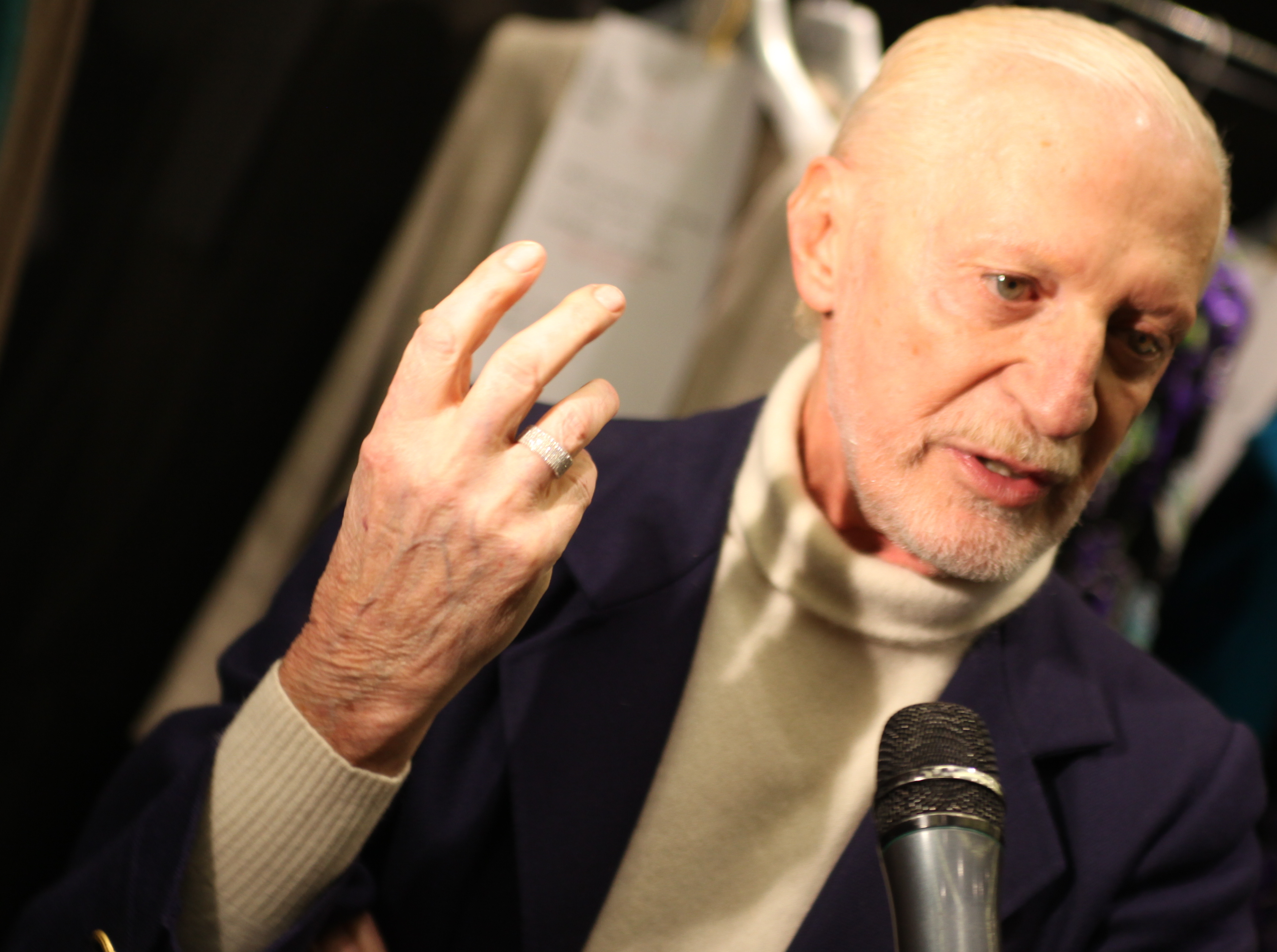
- Riva in 2010
- Born: 3 October 1938; Monza, Italy
- Died: 16 December 2023 (aged 85); Monza, Italy
- Occupation: fashion designer

Lorenzo Riva (3 October 1938 – 16 December 2023) was an Italian fashion designer.

== Biography ==
Born in Monza, the son of a mannequin, Riva opened his first atelier in his hometown at just 18 years old. He had his breakout in 1972, presenting his first couture collection at Palazzo Pitti in Florence. He served as artistic director for a number of fashion houses, notably Balenciaga. He launched his solo brand in 1991, and sold it in 2012, when he started collaborating as creative director with Duomosei. In 2017, he launched the collection "L'Or by Lorenzo Riva".

During his career Riva dressed many celebrities, including Whitney Houston, Penélope Cruz, Ivana Trump, Virna Lisi, Isabella Rossellini, and Emmanuelle Seigner.

Lorenzo Riva died in Monza on 16 December 2023, at the age of 85.
