= Taubaté pregnancy hoax =

2012 hoax in Brazil

An image of Maria Verônica when she was simulating her pregnancy

In January 2012, Maria Verônica Aparecida César Santos (born 1986 or 1987), a Brazilian educator living in Taubaté, simulated being pregnant with quadruplets. Her case was widely covered by prominent national media outlets. She notably appeared on the Record TV show Hoje em Dia, where she received diapers and a furnished room for the alleged daughters for free.

Chris Flores, the host of Hoje em Dia, was skeptical of the pregnancy and asked reporter Michael Keller to investigate the case, revealing that Santos's sonogram had been copied from the internet and edited. Santos sought a lawyer to defend her, who later stated that the case was indeed false. Santos and her husband, Kléber, faced charges of fraud, but the proceedings were suspended and, years later, dismissed. The owner of the original sonogram also sued Santos for moral damages.

Since then, Santos – known as Grávida de Taubaté (lit. 'pregnant woman from Taubaté') – became an Internet meme. In the 2012 Brazilian Carnival, a costume simulating pregnancy was the best-seller in Taubaté. The format "X de Taubaté" ("X of/from Taubaté") was appended to words to suggest hoaxes. After the incident, Maria isolated herself, sought psychiatric help, and changed her habits and appearance. Flores attempted to reconnect with her in subsequent years. A film based around the case was announced in late 2023.

== Case ==
=== Background and hoax repercussions ===
Maria Verônica Aparecida César Santos, resident of Taubaté, owned a preschool and, at the time, had a four-year-old son. Before the hoax was revealed, she reported that she initially thought she was pregnant with twins, but later found out she was pregnant with quadruplets. The case would have been rare, since approximately one in every nine million women became pregnant with quadruplets, in addition to the fact that her husband had a vasectomy. The supposed daughters would be called Maria Klara, Maria Eduarda, Maria Fernanda and Maria Vitória, and each would have specific colors for their belongings.

External videos
- Grávida de quadrigêmeas participa ao vivo do Hoje em Dia — Santos's appearance in Hoje em Dia.

By the next week, Santos had already appeared on six local programs, with details of her pregnancy, and began to be absent from school to record interviews outside of Taubaté. G1 published on January 6, 2012, that "The godparents [...] have already been chosen. The babies' room has also been set up. Verônica is in the 34th week of pregnancy, and the quadruplets are expected to be born in the first half of January." She appeared in several national media outlets, including TV Globo, Folha de S.Paulo, O Estado de S. Paulo, RedeTV! and Rede Bandeirantes. Her most well-known appearance, however, was on Hoje em Dia, on the 11th, one of Record's highest-rated programs. Santos mentioned on the show that she had gained thirty kilograms during her pregnancy, and her belly measured 1.82 meters. In that same program, the sponsor Pampers delivered diapers, and presenter Edu Guedes cried when revealing that the team had made a furnished room for the babies.

=== Hoax revelation ===
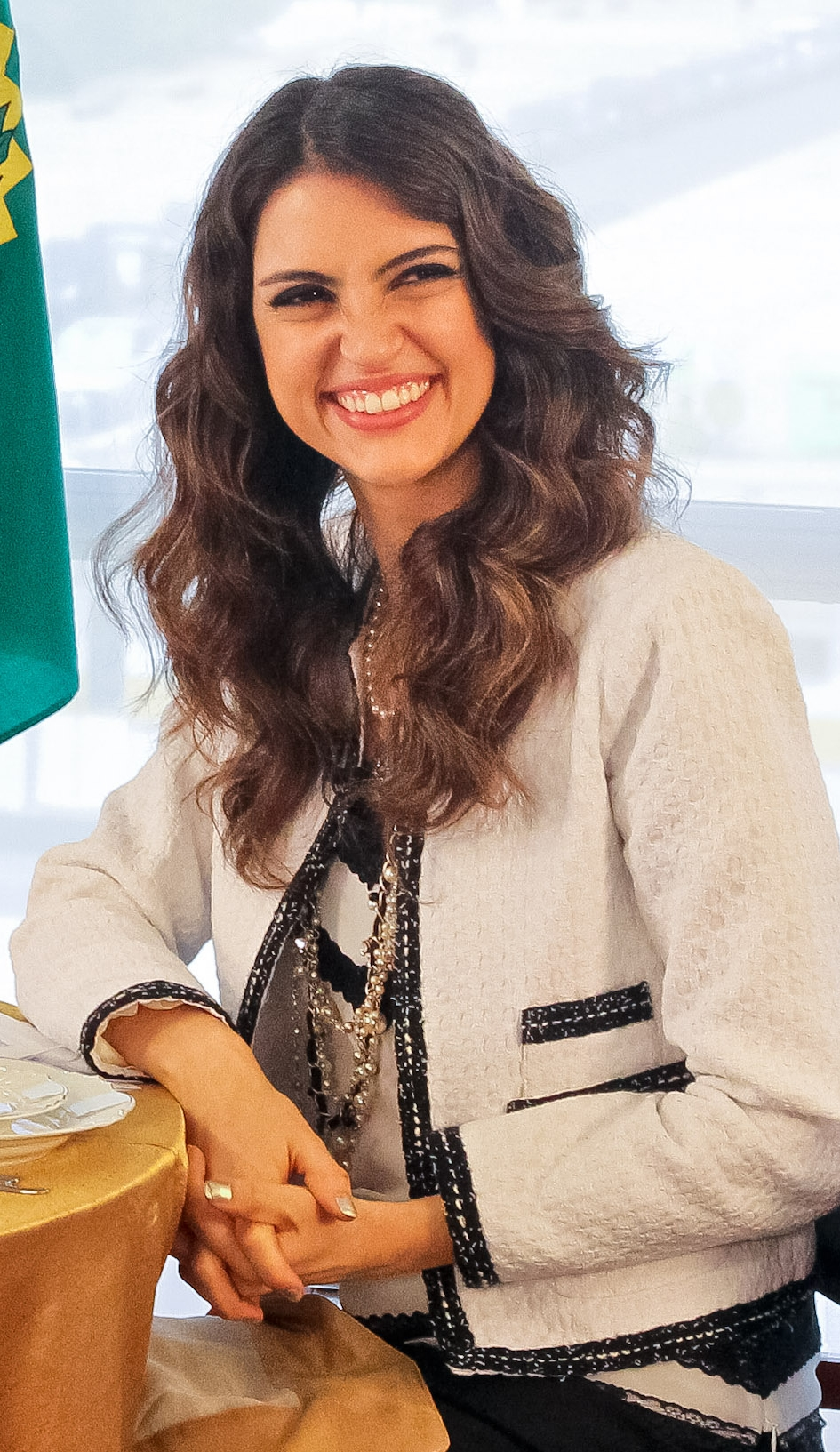
Chris Flores is credited with "unmasking" Santos

Chris Flores, at the time the host of Hoje em Dia, is credited with "unmasking" Santos. On The Noite com Danilo Gentili, she revealed that before going on air with Santos, she expressed her disbelief in Santos's pregnancy in her dressing room. Santos refused to provide any proof. Flores then asked reporter Michael Keller, who would take Santos to Taubaté after the show, to find out if she was truly pregnant. On the same day, he consulted a doctor and discovered that the ultrasound Santos presented as hers was copied from the internet and edited.

On January 15, Record's Domingo Espetacular aired a report indicating that Santos was probably not pregnant. An obstetrician presented evidence that an ultrasound conducted by Verônica on August 30, 2011, showed she was not pregnant, which would be impossible. After Santos's husband filed a police report against Record, the Civil Police requested a pregnancy test on the 17th. The next day, a sectional police chief announced that he would open an investigation into the case.

Meanwhile, Santos was looking for a lawyer to defend her and chose a lawyer recommended by her sister. Initially, Santos wanted to sue those who believed her pregnancy was fake for defamation, but the lawyer was unsure. He agreed to take the case with one condition: Santos had to go to the doctor and prove she was pregnant. However, she did not show up for the appointment. In the early hours of the next day, Santos's sister confirmed that the pregnancy was fake. The lawyer confirmed the hoax to the press on the 20th. Ten days later, he released a photo of Santos without silicone or padding in her belly. In a statement on the 27th, she confessed to faking the pregnancy due to psychological issues, expressing her dream of having a daughter.

=== Lawsuit ===
In March, the owner of the original ultrasound filed a lawsuit against Santos for moral damages, citing the improper use of the image. On May 21, it was decided that Santos would pay 4,000 reais in compensation to her. Furthermore, Santos and her husband Kléber were prosecuted for the crime of embezzlement. However, a court settlement halted the proceedings in November. The case was dismissed in December 2014.

== Legacy ==
Santos became known as "Grávida de Taubaté" (lit. 'pregnant woman from Taubaté') and turned into an Internet meme. A fake pregnancy costume was the best seller at the 2012 Brazilian Carnival in Taubaté. Taubaté became known as the "city of lies", and the format "X de Taubaté" ("X of/from Taubaté") was appended to words to suggest hoaxes. A notable example of Taubaté as a suffix was the "Parkour de Taubaté" meme ("Parkour of Taubaté") in 2020, a name given by Internet users who mocked a video of people doing parkour. Edu Guedes was mocked in subsequent years for crying in Hoje em Dia. Journalist Chico Felitti made an episode about the case in his podcast Além do Meme. The Unidos do Parque Aeroporto samba school, in Taubaté, was the champion in the city's carnival in 2018; one of its blocks was dedicated to Grávida de Taubaté. The case inspired the name of the podcast Filhos da Grávida de Taubaté ("[The] Children of Grávida de Taubaté").

=== Santos and Chris Flores ===
According to a December 2012 G1 article, after the case, Santos "isolated herself, sought treatment and saw her life change completely". She changed her habits and her looks by going blonde. She sought out a psychiatrist, who monitored her until August. At the time of publication, Santos lived in the central region of the city with her husband and son, taking care of the house, as the school where she worked was sold. According to her lawyer, "Today she is fine. She underwent therapy, took medication, but the most important thing was for her to have an understanding of what happened to her." Since then, Santos and Kléber have lived discreetly without easily identifiable profiles on social media. She ran a store of religious items for some time, but later closed it.

In October 2020, Flores told Programa da Maisa that she had already contacted Santos through a mutual friend. In an attempt to have Flores talk directly to Santos, Vem pra Cá's team went to Santos's supposed house on July 6, 2021, but the reporter and cameraman were attacked by her alleged husband. The incident was broadcast live. In December the same year, Flores told Vênus Podcast that "everything was fine" between the two.

In January 2025, Santos posted a video on a new YouTube channel, announcing that she will post weekly videos to tell the story of her life and her "reunion with God". She said: "Many people know me as Grávida de Taubaté, but now I want to be known as Maria Verônica".

=== Film ===
In September 2023, director Frank "Diaraki" announced a movie about the case, titled Grávida de 4 ("Pregnant with 4"), with filming scheduled to begin in the second quarter of 2024. The film will be inspired by Parasite (2019), with Frank describing it as a "comedy thriller like you've never seen." According to Frank, the film is in pre-production, but he had already signed off on the script. In October 2023, actress Viih Tube was invited to play Santos.

== See also ==
- List of hoaxes
