= Fernanda Motta =

Brazilian model, actress, and television host

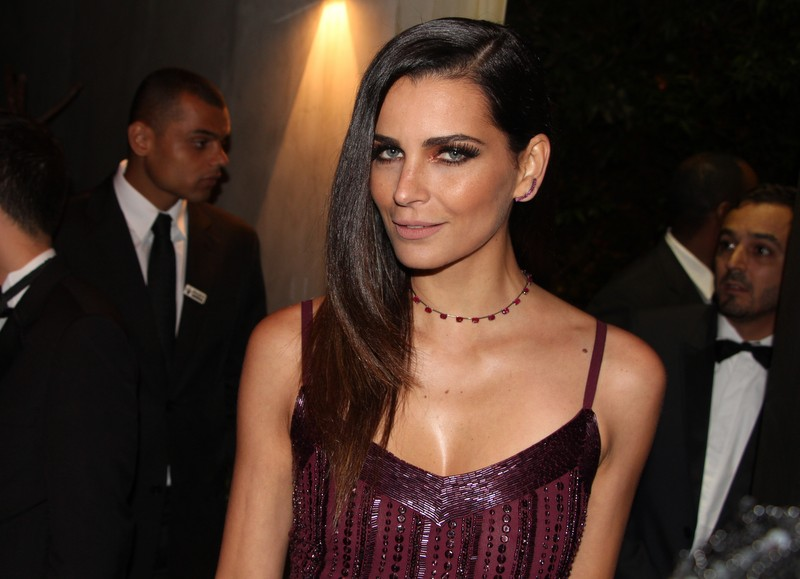
- Born: May 29, 1981 (age 45); Campos dos Goytacazes, Rio de Janeiro, Brazil
- Occupations: Model, actress
- Years active: 2001–present
- Modeling information
- Height: 5 ft 10 in (1.78 m)
- Hair color: Brown
- Eye color: Blue
- Agencies: IMG Models (New York) View Management (Barcelona); Modelwerk (Hamburg); Mega Model Brazil (Sao Paulo)
- Website: http://www.fernandamotta.com.br/

Fernanda Motta (born May 29, 1981) is a Brazilian model, actress, and television host. She was the host of the reality TV show Brazil's Next Top Model, the Brazilian version of the show, created by Tyra Banks.

== Biography ==
Motta was born and grew up in Campos dos Goytacazes, Rio de Janeiro, Brazil. The youngest child of a large extended family, Motta was discovered on Guarapari Beach, just north of Rio de Janeiro at the age of 16 by a talent scout.

== Modeling ==
Motta has appeared on the covers of numerous magazines around the world, including Vogue, ELLE, Cosmopolitan, and Glamour. Her advertisements include Rolex, Palmolive, Cori, Pantene, and Moët & Chandon, and she has walked for Cia Marítima, Gucci, and Chanel. She has appeared in four editions of the Sports Illustrated Swimsuit Issue, most recently in 2007. In 2005, she ranked 19th in the "Top 25 Sexiest Models" list by "Models.com". She is signed to Chic Management in Sydney, Australia, and to Elite Model Management in New York City. She currently lives in New York City.

== Brazil's Next Top Model ==
In 2007, Motta was chosen to be the host of the Brazil's Next Top Model. In order to accept the job, Motta, who lives in New York City, United States, reportedly cancelled most of her agenda so that she could stay in the country for two months straight.

Motta also was a guest judge on the episode "The Amazing Model Race" from America's Next Top Model, Cycle 12, when the final six contestants arrived in São Paulo, Brazil. She also appeared in a Rosa Chá swimsuit fashion show on the final episode "America's Next Top Model Is...", in the same season.

== Filmography ==
=== Actress ===
Year	Title	Role	Notes
2001	Sólo por Hoy		Just for Today (English title)
2005	Yes, Dear	Attractive woman	TV series: Jimmy Sponsors a Vacatio
2015	Totalmente Demais	Danielle	Soap opera: Cameo

=== Self ===
Year	Title	Role	Notes
2006	Sports Illustrated: Swimsuit 2006	Model	TV
2007	Sports Illustrated: Swimsuit 2007	Model	TV
2007–2009	Brazil's Next Top Model	Host	Reality TV series (all episodes)
2008	Hebe	Guest Star	Talk show (in Brazil)
2009	America's Next Top Model	Guest Judge	Reality TV series (2 episodes): The Amazing Model Race; America's Next Top Model Is...
