= Dudu Bertholini =

Brazilian designer

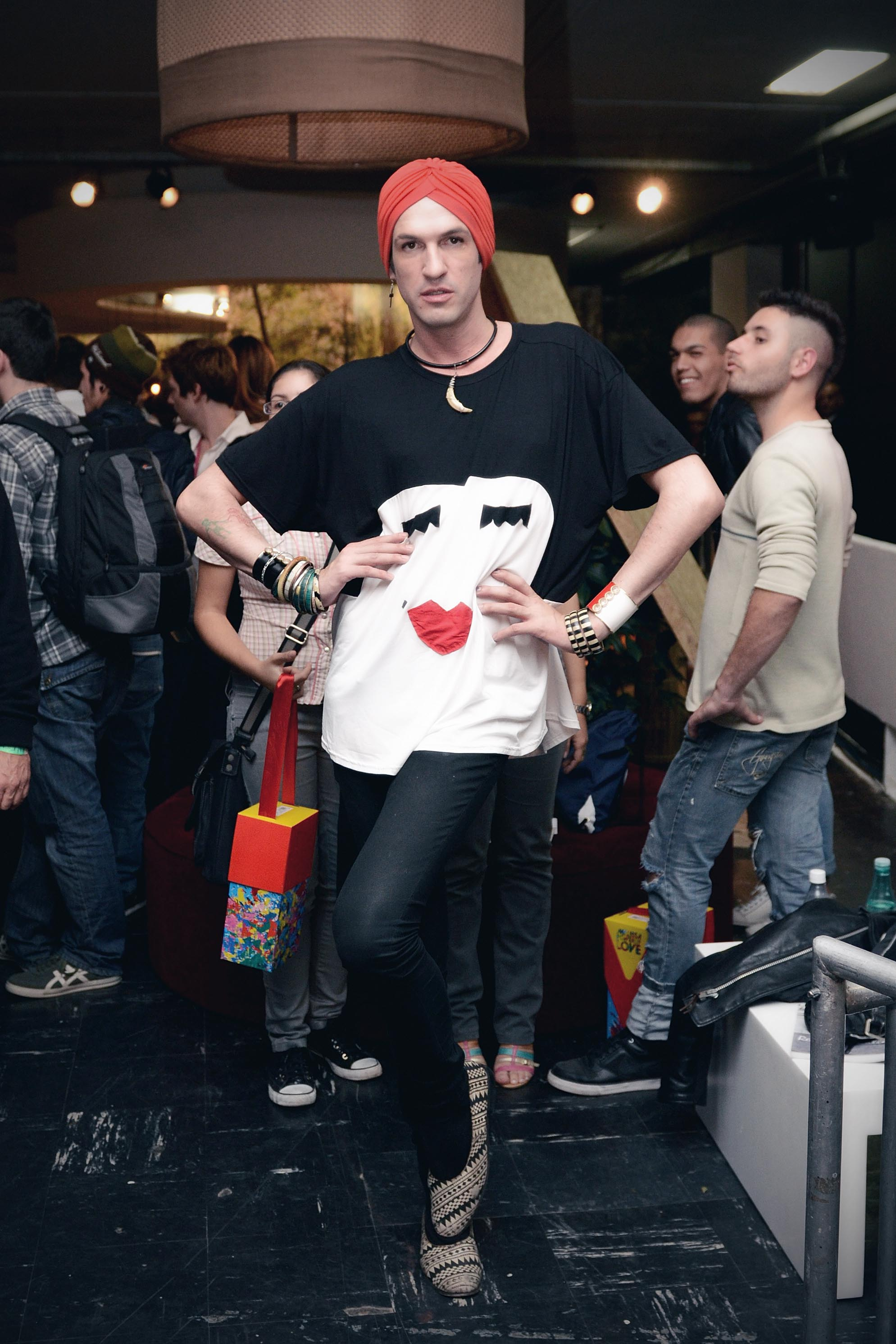
- Bertholini in 2011
- Born: José Eduardo Bertholini; São Paulo, Brazil
- Occupations: Designer; stylist

Dudu Bertholini is a Brazilian designer and stylist, and a judge on the television series Brazil's Next Top Model and Drag Race Brasil.

== Filmography ==
=== Television ===
- Brazil's Next Top Model
- Drag Race Brasil
- A Dona do Pedaço
- Salve-se Quem Puder

== See also ==
- Christine Yufon, a prominent Bertholini muse
